= 2020 United States House of Representatives elections in New York =

- November 3, 2020

All 27 New York seats to the United States House of Representatives
	Majority party	Minority party
Party	Democratic	Republican
Last election	21	6
Seats won	19	8
Seat change	▼2	▲2
Popular vote	5,084,863	2,978,407
Percentage	61.96%	36.29%
Swing	▼5.20%	▲5.07%

Democratic hold
Republican hold Republican gain
Democratic
50–60%
60–70%
70–80%
80–90%
90–100%
Republican
40–50%
50–60%
60–70%
70–80%

The 2020 United States House of Representatives elections in New York were held on November 3, 2020, to elect the 27 U.S. representatives from the State of New York, one from each of the state's 27 congressional districts. The elections coincided with the 2020 U.S. presidential election, as well as other elections to the House of Representatives, elections to the United States Senate and various state and local elections. The primary election was held on June 23, 2020.

== Overview ==
2020 United States House of Representatives elections in New York
Party	Votes	Percentage	Seats	+/–
Democratic	4,728,613	57.55%	19	▼2
Republican	2,696,731	32.82%	8	▲2
Working Families	352,682	4.29%	0	
Conservative	315,541	3.84%	0	
Independence	50,045	0.61%	0	
Libertarian	42,495	0.52%	0	
Green	13,902	0.17%	0	
Serve America	8,842	0.11%	0	
Independent	7,472	0.09%	0	
Totals	8,216,323	100.00%	27	

Popular vote
Democratic	57.55%
Republican	32.82%
Other	9.63%

House seats by party nomination
Democratic	70.37%
Working Families	48.15%
Independence	33.33%
Conservative	29.63%
Republican	29.63%
Serve America	11.11%
Libertarian	3.70%

House seats by party registration
Democratic	70.37%
Republican	29.63%

=== District ===
Results of the 2020 United States House of Representatives elections in New York by district:

District	Democratic		Republican		Others		Total		Result
District	Votes	%	Votes	%	Votes	%	Votes	%	Result
District 1	169,294	45.14%	205,715	54.86%	0	0.00%	375,009	100.00%	Republican hold
District 2	154,246	46.03%	177,379	52.94%	3,448	1.03%	335,073	100.00%	Republican hold
District 3	208,555	55.97%	161,931	43.45%	2,156	0.58%	372,642	100.00%	Democratic hold
District 4	199,762	56.15%	153,007	43.00%	3,024	0.85%	355,793	100.00%	Democratic hold
District 5	229,125	100.00%	0	0.00%	0	0.00%	229,125	100.00%	Democratic hold
District 6	158,862	67.98%	74,829	32.02%	0	0.00%	233,691	100.00%	Democratic hold
District 7	191,073	84.88%	32,520	14.45%	1,522	0.68%	225,115	100.00%	Democratic hold
District 8	234,933	84.83%	42,007	15.17%	0	0.00%	276,940	100.00%	Democratic hold
District 9	230,221	83.15%	43,950	15.87%	2,696	0.97%	276,867	100.00%	Democratic hold
District 10	206,310	74.60%	66,889	24.18%	3,370	1.22%	276,569	100.00%	Democratic hold
District 11	137,198	46.86%	155,608	53.14%	0	0.00%	292,806	100.00%	Republican gain
District 12	265,172	82.29%	53,061	16.47%	4,015	1.25%	322,248	100.00%	Democratic hold
District 13	231,841	90.93%	19,829	7.78%	3,295	1.29%	254,965	100.00%	Democratic hold
District 14	152,661	71.64%	58,440	27.42%	2,000	0.94%	213,101	100.00%	Democratic hold
District 15	169,533	88.87%	21,221	11.12%	0	0.00%	190,754	100.00%	Democratic hold
District 16	218,514	84.17%	0	0.00%	41,094	15.83%	259,608	100.00%	Democratic hold
District 17	197,354	59.33%	117,309	35.26%	17,995	5.41%	332,658	100.00%	Democratic hold
District 18	187,444	55.83%	145,145	43.23%	3,164	0.94%	335,753	100.00%	Democratic hold
District 19	192,100	54.79%	151,475	43.20%	7,023	2.00%	350,598	100.00%	Democratic hold
District 20	219,705	61.17%	139,446	38.83%	0	0.00%	359,151	100.00%	Democratic hold
District 21	131,995	41.16%	188,655	58.83%	0	0.00%	320,650	100.00%	Republican hold
District 22	155,989	47.77%	156,098	47.77%	6,780	2.08%	326,566	100.00%	Republican gain
District 23	128,976	41.11%	181,021	57.70%	3,650	1.16%	313,724	100.00%	Republican hold
District 24	147,877	42.99%	182,809	53.15%	13,264	3.86%	343,950	100.00%	Republican hold
District 25	206,396	59.32%	136,198	39.15%	5,325	1.53%	347,919	100.00%	Democratic hold
District 26	223,366	69.87%	91,706	28.68%	4,631	1.45%	319,703	100.00%	Democratic hold
District 27	149,449	39.00%	228,885	59.73%	4,877	1.27%	383,211	100.00%	Republican hold
Total	5,097,951	61.99%	2,985,133	36.30%	133,329	1.62%	8,224,189	100.00%	

== District 1 ==
2020 New York's 1st congressional district election
- November 3, 2020
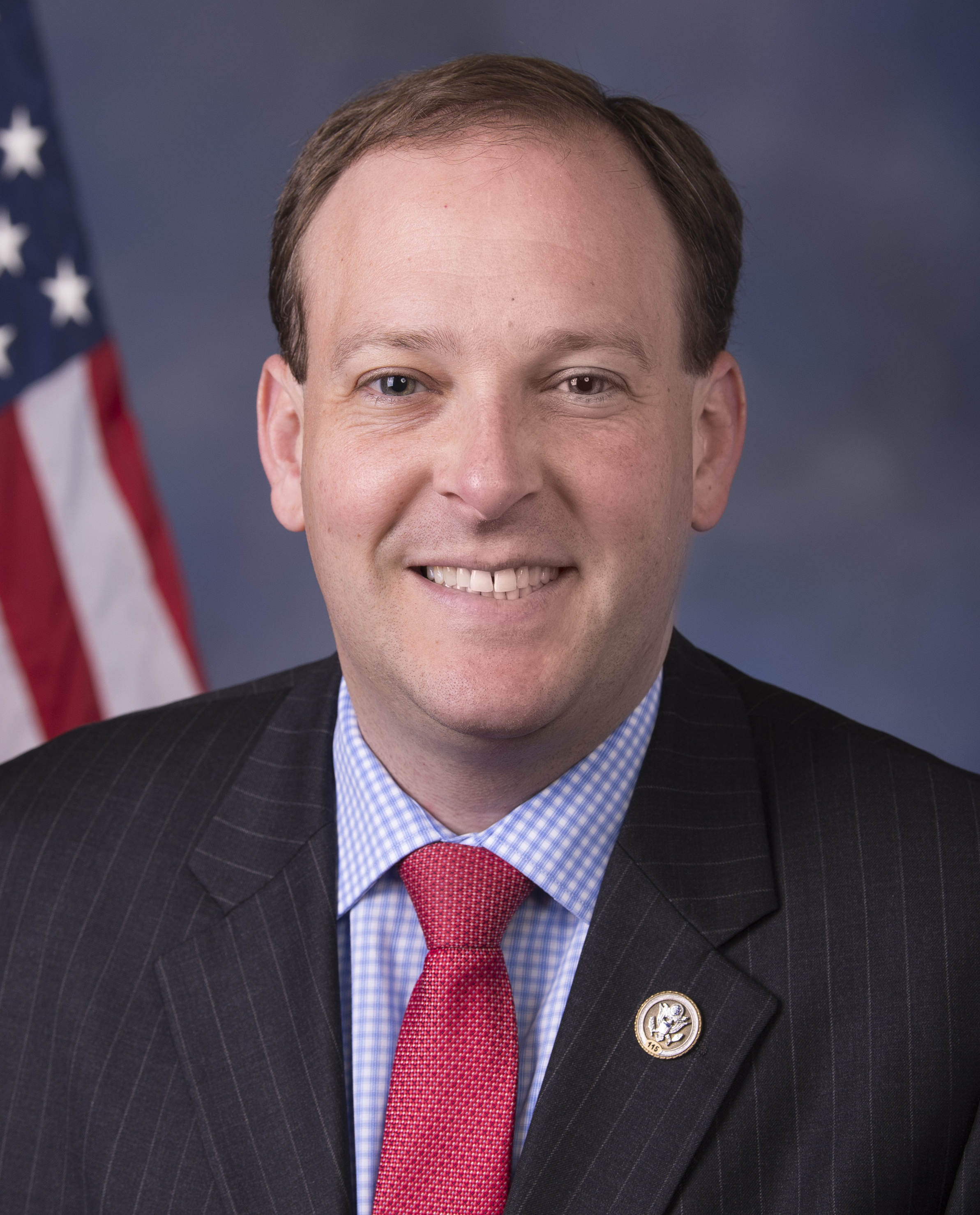

Nominee	Lee Zeldin	Nancy Goroff
Party	Republican	Democratic
Alliance	Conservative; Independence	Working Families
Popular vote	205,715	169,294
Percentage	54.9%	45.1%
- Zeldin: 50–60% 60–70% 70–80% Goroff: 50–60% 60–70% 70–80% 80–90% >90% Tie: 50% No votes
U.S. Representative before election
Lee Zeldin
Republican
Elected U.S. Representative
Lee Zeldin
Republican

The 1st district is based in eastern Long Island, and includes most of central and eastern Suffolk County, including most of Smithtown and all of Brookhaven, Riverhead, Southold, Southampton, East Hampton, and Shelter Island. The incumbent was Republican Lee Zeldin, who was reelected with 51.5% of the vote in 2018.

=== Republican primary ===
==== Candidates ====
===== Declared =====
- Lee Zeldin, incumbent U.S. representative

=== Democratic primary ===
==== Candidates ====
===== Declared =====
- Gregory-John Fischer, Libertarian candidate for Suffolk County executive in 2019
- Bridget Fleming, Suffolk County legislator
- Perry Gershon, businessman and nominee for New York's 1st congressional district in 2018
- Nancy Goroff, chair of the Stony Brook University chemistry department

===== Failed to qualify for ballot =====
- David Gokhshtein, cryptocurrency entrepreneur

===== Declined =====
- Kate Browning, former Suffolk County legislator and candidate for New York's 1st congressional district in 2018
- Dave Calone, venture capitalist and candidate for New York's 1st congressional district in 2016
- John Feal, veteran and nonprofit executive
- Jack Harrington, attorney
- Mark Lesko, former Brookhaven town supervisor
- Jack Martilotta, high school football coach
- Jay Schneiderman, Southampton town supervisor
- Errol Toulon, Suffolk County sheriff

==== Endorsements ====
Bridget Fleming

U.S. representatives

- Kathleen Rice, U.S. representative for New York's 4th congressional district

State officials

- Fred Thiele, state assemblyman

Individuals

- Cynthia Nixon, actress and activist; candidate for governor in 2018

==== Polling ====
Poll source	Date(s) administered	Sample size (Note: Key: A – all adults RV – registered voters LV – likely voters V – unclear)	Margin of error	Gregory-John Fischer	Bridget Fleming	Perry Gershon	Nancy Goroff	Undecided
Honan Strategy Group (Note: Poll sponsored by Fleming's campaign)	May 24–31, 2020	640 (LV)	± 3.85%	–	29%	22%	29%	–
Global Strategy Group (Note: Poll sponsored by Goroff's campaign)	May 26–28, 2020	401 (LV)	± 4.9%	1%	17%	29%	27%	–
Global Strategy Group	Early April 2020	– (V) (Note: Not yet released)	–	1%	16%	33%	11%	–
GBAO Strategies (Note: Poll sponsored by Gershon's campaign)	January 27–30, 2020	500 (LV)	± 4.4%	–	21%	42%	9%	–

==== Primary results ====
Democratic primary results
Party	Candidate	Votes	%
Democratic	Nancy Goroff	17,970	36.1
Democratic	Perry Gershon	17,303	34.8
Democratic	Bridget Fleming	13,718	27.6
Democratic	Gregory-John Fischer	775	1.5
Total votes		49,766	100.0

=== Endorsements ===
Lee Zeldin (R)

Organizations

- Republican Jewish Coalition
- Tea Party Express

Unions

- Uniformed Fire Officers Association
Nancy Goroff

Executive branch officials

- Joe Biden, former vice president and Democratic nominee for president in 2020
- Barack Obama, former president of the United States

U.S. senators

- Kirsten Gillibrand, U.S. senator (D-NY)
- Chuck Schumer, U.S. senator (D-NY)

Organizations

- 314 Action
- Brady Campaign
- DCCC Red to Blue
- Emily's List
- J Street PAC
- League of Conservation Voters
- NARAL Pro-Choice America
- Planned Parenthood Action Fund
- Sierra Club Action Fund

Unions

- Public Employees Federation
- SEIU 32BJ

Newspapers and other publications

- The New York Times
- Newsday

==== Predictions ====
Source	Ranking	As of
The Cook Political Report	Lean R	August 16, 2020
Inside Elections	Lean R	October 16, 2020
Sabato's Crystal Ball	Lean R	September 3, 2020
Politico	Lean R	April 19, 2020
Daily Kos	Likely R	June 3, 2020
RCP	Lean R	June 9, 2020
Niskanen	Lean R	June 7, 2020

==== Polling ====
Poll source	Date(s) administered	Sample size	Margin of error	Lee Zeldin (R)	Nancy Goroff (D)	Undecided
GQR Research (D) (Note: Poll sponsored by 314 Action, which has endorsed Goroff prior to the sampling period.)	October 5–8, 2020	402 (LV)	± 4.9%	49%	48%	2%
Tulchin Research (D) (Note: Poll conducted by the DCCC, which works to elect Democratic candidates.)	August 5–10, 2020	400 (LV)	± 4.9%	46%	48%	–
Global Strategy Group (D)	August 3–5, 2020	400 (LV)	± 4.9%	47%	42%	–
Public Policy Polling (D)	July 14–15, 2020	1,100 (V)	± 3.0%	47%	40%	–

==== Results ====
New York's 1st congressional district, 2020
Party	Candidate	Votes	%
Republican	Lee Zeldin	180,855	48.2
Conservative	Lee Zeldin	21,611	5.8
Independence	Lee Zeldin	3,249	0.9
Total	Lee Zeldin (incumbent)	205,715	54.9
Democratic	Nancy Goroff	160,978	42.9
Working Families	Nancy Goroff	8,316	2.2
Total	Nancy Goroff	169,294	45.1
Total votes		375,009	100.0
Republican hold			

== District 2 ==
2020 New York's 2nd congressional district election
- November 3, 2020
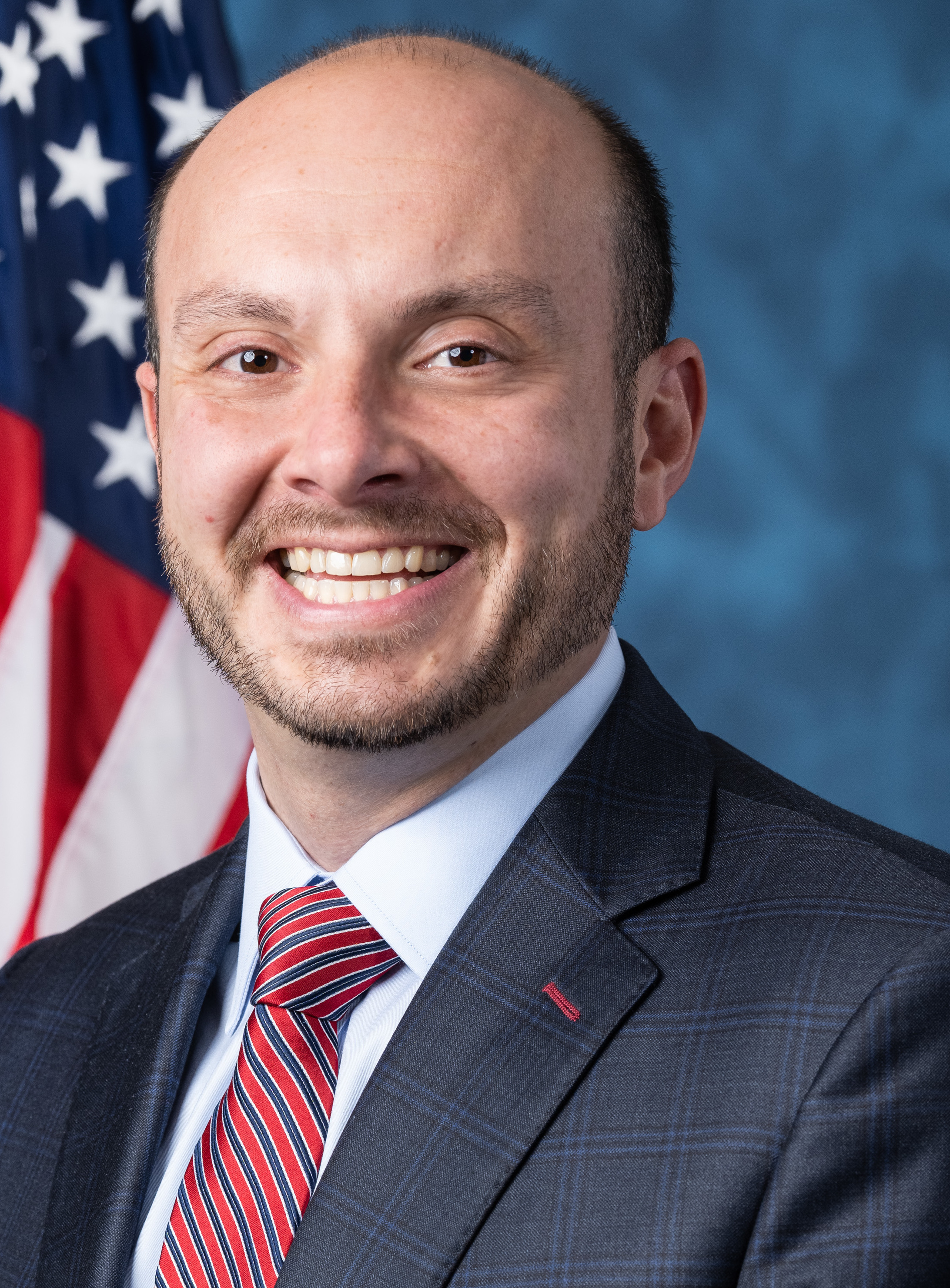

Nominee	Andrew Garbarino	Jackie Gordon
Party	Republican	Democratic
Alliance	Conservative; Libertarian; SAM	Working Families; Independence
Popular vote	177,379	154,246
Percentage	52.9%	46.0%
- County results Garbarino: 60–70% Gordon: 50–60%
U.S. Representative before election
Peter T. King
Republican
Elected U.S. Representative
Andrew Garbarino
Republican

The 2nd district is based on the South Shore of Long Island, and includes the southwestern Suffolk County communities of Amityville, Copiague, Lindenhurst, Gilgo, West Babylon, Wyandanch, North Babylon, Babylon, Baywood, Brentwood, Brightwaters, Central Islip, Islip, Great River, Ocean Beach, Oakdale, West Sayville, Bohemia, West Islip and Ronkonkoma, in addition to a sliver of southeastern Nassau County encompassing Levittown, North Wantagh, Seaford, South Farmingdale and Massapequa. The incumbent was Republican Peter T. King, who was reelected with 53.1% of the vote in 2018. On November 11, 2019, King announced he would retire after more than 26 years in Congress.

=== Republican primary ===
==== Candidates ====
===== Declared =====
- Andrew Garbarino, state assemblyman
- Mike LiPetri, state assemblyman

===== Withdrawn =====
- Trish Bergin, Islip town councilwoman
- Nancy Hemendinger, Suffolk County health official
- Nick LaLota, Suffolk County elections commissioner (running for New York's 8th State Senate district)

===== Declined =====
- Phil Boyle, state senator
- Tom Cilmi, minority leader of the Suffolk County Legislature
- Michael Fitzpatrick, state assemblyman
- Chuck Fuschillo, former state senator
- James Kennedy, Nassau County legislator
- Peter T. King, incumbent U.S. representative
- Steve Labriola, Oyster Bay town councilman
- Rick Lazio, former U.S. representative for New York's 2nd congressional district (1993–2001), nominee for U.S. Senate in 2000, and candidate for Governor of New York in 2010
- Steve Levy, former Suffolk County executive
- Mary Kate Mullen, Islip town councilwoman
- Kate Murray, Hempstead town clerk
- Joseph Saladino, Oyster Bay town supervisor
- Douglas M. Smith, state assemblyman
- Erin King Sweeney, former Hempstead town councilwoman and daughter of U.S. representative Peter T. King
- Donald Trump Jr., businessman and son of President Donald Trump
- Lara Trump, campaign advisor and daughter-in-law of President Donald Trump

==== Endorsements ====
Andrew Garbarino (R)

Federal politicians

- Peter T. King, U.S. representative from NY-02 (1993–present)

Organizations

- The New York Young Republican Club

==== Polling ====
Hypothetical polling

with Rick Lazio and Lara Trump

Poll source	Date(s) administered	Sample size	Margin of error	Rick Lazio	Lara Trump	Undecided
WPA Intelligence/Club for Growth (Note: Club for Growth is an organization that only supports Republican candidates)	November 17–18, 2019	400 (LV)	–	19%	53%	28%

==== Primary results ====
Republican primary results
Party	Candidate	Votes	%
Republican	Andrew Garbarino	17,462	63.9
Republican	Mike LiPetri	9,867	36.1
Total votes		27,329	100.0

=== Democratic primary ===
==== Candidates ====
===== Declared =====
- Jackie Gordon, Babylon town councilwoman and U.S. Army veteran
- Patricia Maher, attorney and nominee for New York's 2nd congressional district in 2014

===== Failed to qualify for ballot =====
- Mike Sax, political blogger

===== Declined =====
- Steve Bellone, Suffolk County executive
- Liuba Grechen Shirley, community organizer and nominee for New York's 2nd congressional district in 2018
- Christine Pellegrino, former state assemblywoman
- Tim Sini, Suffolk County district attorney

==== Endorsements ====
Jackie Gordon (D)

Nationwide executive officials

- Joe Biden, 47th vice president of the United States
- Barack Obama, 44th president of the United States

Federal politicians

- Kirsten Gillibrand, U.S. senator from New York
- Kamala Harris, U.S. senator from California, 2020 vice-presidential nominee
- Amy Klobuchar, U.S. senator from Minnesota
- Chuck Schumer, U.S. senator from New York

State officials

- Kathy Hochul, Lieutenant Governor of New York

Organizations

- Black Economic Alliance
- Democratic Majority for Israel PAC
- Emily's List
- End Citizens United
- Giffords PAC
- Human Rights Campaign
- League of Conservation Voters
- NARAL Pro-Choice America
- Planned Parenthood Action Fund
- Sierra Club
- VoteVets

Labor unions

- New York AFL–CIO
- Public Employees Federation
- Service Employees International Union Local 1199
- United Auto Workers 9A New York Area Cap Council
- United Food and Commercial Workers Local 1500

==== Primary results ====
Democratic primary results
Party	Candidate	Votes	%
Democratic	Jackie Gordon	25,317	72.8
Democratic	Patricia Maher	9,475	27.2
Total votes		34,792	100.0

=== Green Party ===
==== Candidates ====
===== Declared =====
- Harry R. Burger, mechanical design engineer

=== Independents ===
==== Candidates ====
===== Declared =====
- Daniel C. Ross, historian

=== General election ===
==== Predictions ====
Source	Ranking	As of
The Cook Political Report	Tossup	September 29, 2020
Inside Elections	Tossup	September 18, 2020
Sabato's Crystal Ball	Lean R	September 3, 2020
Politico	Tossup	September 8, 2020
Daily Kos	Tossup	August 31, 2020
RCP	Tossup	June 9, 2020
Niskanen	Lean R	July 26, 2020

==== Results ====
New York's 2nd congressional district, 2020
Party	Candidate	Votes	%
Republican	Andrew Garbarino	158,151	47.2
Conservative	Andrew Garbarino	17,434	5.2
Libertarian	Andrew Garbarino	1,491	0.4
SAM	Andrew Garbarino	303	0.1
Total	Andrew Garbarino	177,379	52.9
Democratic	Jackie Gordon	144,849	43.2
Working Families	Jackie Gordon	6,380	1.9
Independence	Jackie Gordon	3,017	0.9
Total	Jackie Gordon	154,246	46.0
Green	Harry Burger	3,448	1.1
Total votes		335,073	100.0
Republican hold			

== District 3 ==
2020 New York's 3rd congressional district election
- November 3, 2020
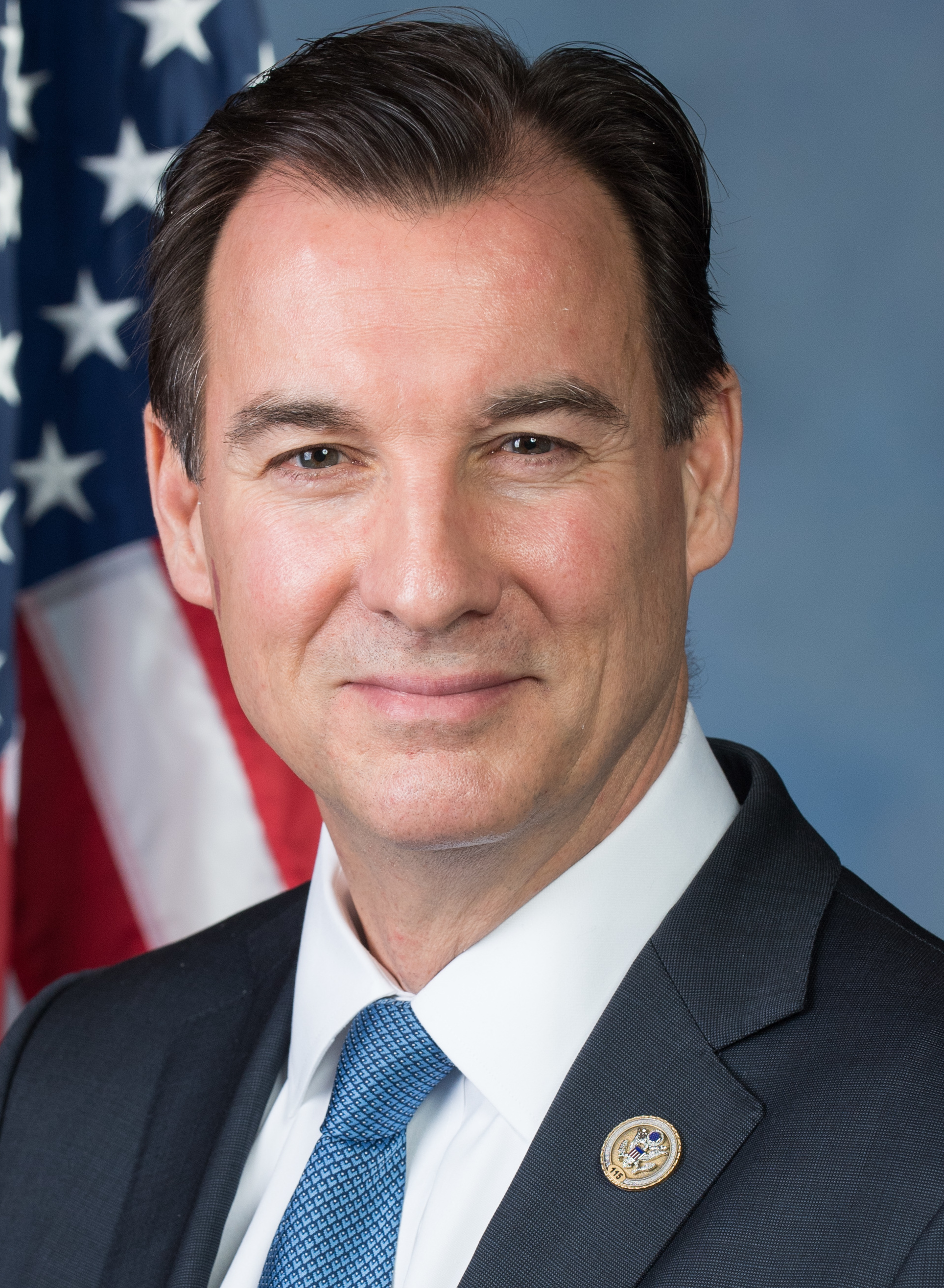

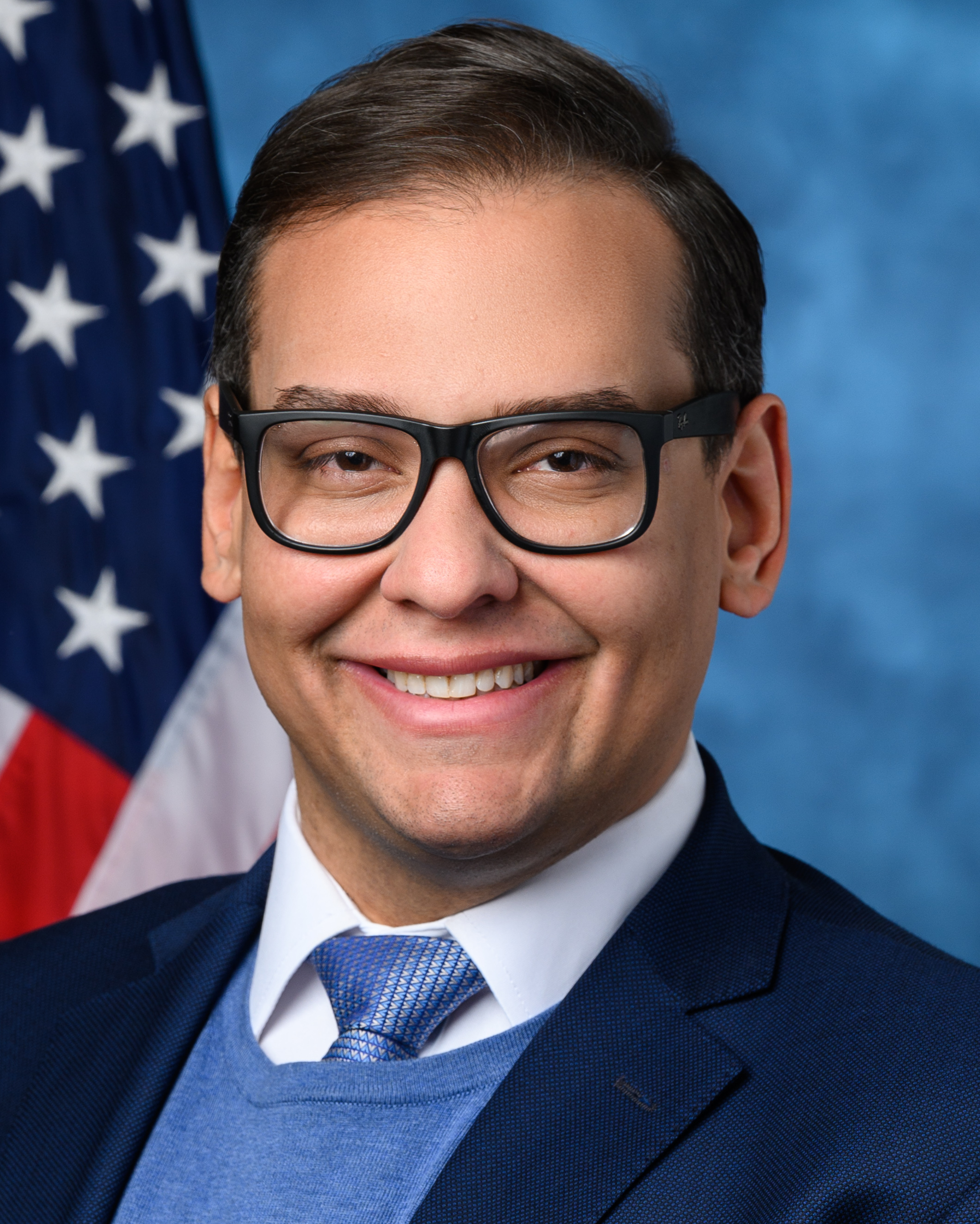
Nominee	Tom Suozzi	George Santos
Party	Democratic	Republican
Alliance	Working Families; Independence	Conservative
Popular vote	208,555	161,931
Percentage	55.9%	43.4%
- County results Suozzi: 50–60% 60–70%
U.S. Representative before election
Tom Suozzi
Democratic
Elected U.S. Representative
Tom Suozzi
Democratic

The 3rd district is based on the North Shore of Long Island, and includes the northwestern Suffolk County and northern Nassau County communities of West Hills, Sands Point, Laurel Hollow, Upper Brookville, Munsey Park, Brookville, Oyster Bay Cove, Old Brookville, Kings Point, Lattingtown, Matinecock, Muttontown, Lloyd Harbor, Syosset, Glen Cove, Roslyn, Manhasset, Huntington, Dix Hills, Plainview, Bethpage, northern Farmingdale, Hicksville, Northport, Commack, Port Washington, and Great Neck. Queens neighborhoods in the district include Little Neck, Whitestone, Glen Oaks, and Floral Park. The incumbent was Democrat Tom Suozzi, who was re-elected with 59% of the vote in 2018. On November 3, 2020, Suozzi defeated Republican nominee George Santos 56% to 43%

=== Democratic primary ===
==== Candidates ====
===== Declared =====
- Melanie D'Arrigo, activist and healthcare professional
- Tom Suozzi, incumbent U.S. representative
- Michael Weinstock, former prosecutor

==== Declined ====
- Robert Zimmerman, Democratic National Committee member and communications professional

==== Endorsements ====
Melanie D'Arrigo

Organizations

- Brand New Congress
- Indivisible movement
- National Organization for Women
- New York Communities for Change
Tom Suozzi

Organizations

- End Citizens United
- New York League of Conservation Voters
- Public Employees Federation
- Service Employees International Union - Local 1199
- Sierra Club

==== Primary results ====
Democratic primary results
Party	Candidate	Votes	%
Democratic	Tom Suozzi (incumbent)	36,812	66.5
Democratic	Melanie D'Arrigo	14,269	25.8
Democratic	Michael Weinstock	4,284	7.7
Total votes		55,365	100.0

=== Republican primary ===
==== Candidates ====
===== Declared =====
- George Santos, former call center employee

==== Endorsements ====
George Santos

Organizations

- New York Young Republican Club

=== General election ===
==== Predictions ====
Source	Ranking	As of
The Cook Political Report	Safe D	July 2, 2020
Inside Elections	Safe D	June 2, 2020
Sabato's Crystal Ball	Safe D	July 2, 2020
Politico	Likely D	April 19, 2020
Daily Kos	Safe D	June 3, 2020
RCP	Likely D	October 24, 2020
Niskanen	Safe D	June 7, 2020

==== Polling ====
Poll source	Date(s) administered	Sample size	Margin of error	Tom Suozzi (D)	George Santos (R)	Undecided
Douma Research (R)	August 1–2, 2020	550 (LV)	± 4.2%	50%	39%	11%

Hypothetical polling

Poll source	Date(s) administered	Sample size	Margin of error	Generic Democrat	Generic Republican	Undecided
Douma Research (R)	August 1–2, 2020	550 (LV)	± 4.2%	46%	41%	13%

==== Results ====
New York's 3rd congressional district, 2020
Party	Candidate	Votes	%
Democratic	Tom Suozzi	196,056	52.6
Working Families	Tom Suozzi	9,203	2.5
Independence	Tom Suozzi	3,296	0.9
Total	Tom Suozzi (incumbent)	208,555	55.9
Republican	George Santos	147,461	39.6
Conservative	George Santos	14,470	3.9
Total	George Santos	161,931	43.4
Libertarian	Howard Rabin	2,156	0.5
Total votes		372,642	100.0
Democratic hold			

== District 4 ==
2020 New York's 4th congressional district election
- November 3, 2020
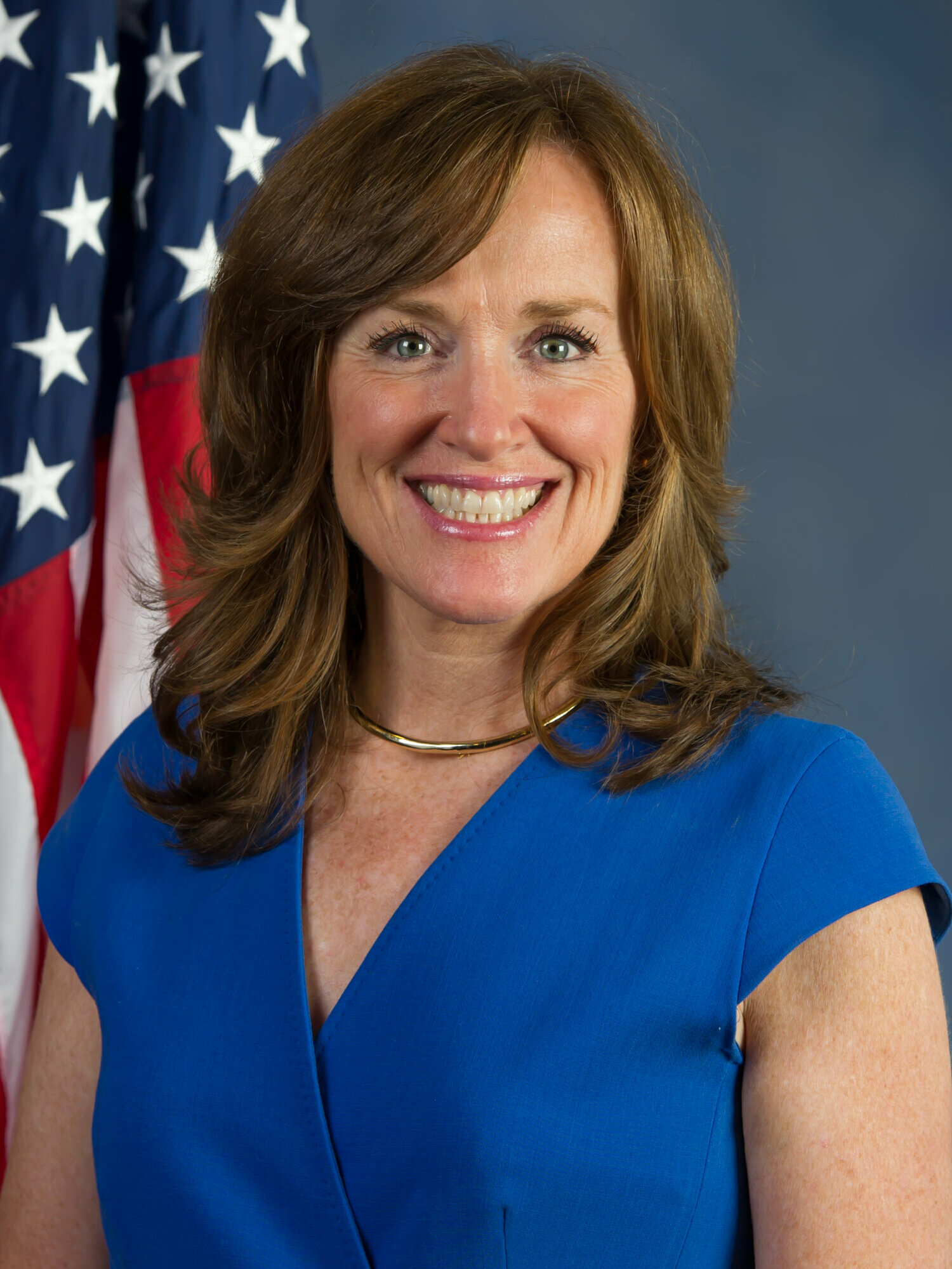

Nominee	Kathleen Rice	Douglas Tuman
Party	Democratic	Republican
Alliance		Conservative
Popular vote	199,762	153,007
Percentage	56.1%	43.0%
- County results Rice: 50–60%
U.S. Representative before election
Kathleen Rice
Democratic
Elected U.S. Representative
Kathleen Rice
Democratic

The 4th district is based central and southern Nassau County, and includes the communities of Baldwin, Bellmore, East Rockaway, East Meadow, the Five Towns, Lynbrook, Floral Park, Franklin Square, Garden City, Hempstead, Long Beach, Malverne, Freeport, Merrick, Mineola, Carle Place, New Hyde Park, Oceanside, Rockville Centre, Roosevelt, Uniondale, Wantagh, West Hempstead, Westbury and parts of Valley Stream. The incumbent was Democrat Kathleen Rice, who was re-elected with 61.3% of the vote in 2018.

=== Democratic primary ===
==== Candidates ====
===== Declared =====
- Kathleen Rice, incumbent U.S. representative

==== Endorsements ====
Kathleen Rice

Organizations

- New York League of Conservation Voters

Labor unions

- Public Employees Federation

=== Republican primary ===
==== Candidates ====
===== Declared =====
- Cindy Grosz, publicist
- Douglas Tuman, attorney

==== Primary results ====
Republican primary results
Party	Candidate	Votes	%
Republican	Douglas Tuman	10,898	71.7
Republican	Cindy Grosz	4,292	28.3
Total votes		15,190	100.0

=== Green Party ===
==== Candidates ====
===== Declared =====
- Joseph R. Naham, chairman of the Nassau County Green Party

=== General election ===
==== Predictions ====
Source	Ranking	As of
The Cook Political Report	Safe D	July 2, 2020
Inside Elections	Safe D	June 2, 2020
Sabato's Crystal Ball	Safe D	July 2, 2020
Politico	Safe D	April 19, 2020
Daily Kos	Safe D	June 3, 2020
RCP	Safe D	June 9, 2020
Niskanen	Safe D	June 7, 2020

==== Results ====
New York's 4th congressional district, 2020
Party	Candidate	Votes	%
Democratic	Kathleen Rice (incumbent)	199,762	56.1
Republican	Douglas Tuman	139,559	39.2
Conservative	Douglas Tuman	13,448	3.8
Total	Douglas Tuman	153,007	43.0
Green	Joseph R. Naham	3,024	0.9
Total votes		355,793	100.0
Democratic hold			

== District 5 ==
2020 New York's 5th congressional district election
- November 3, 2020
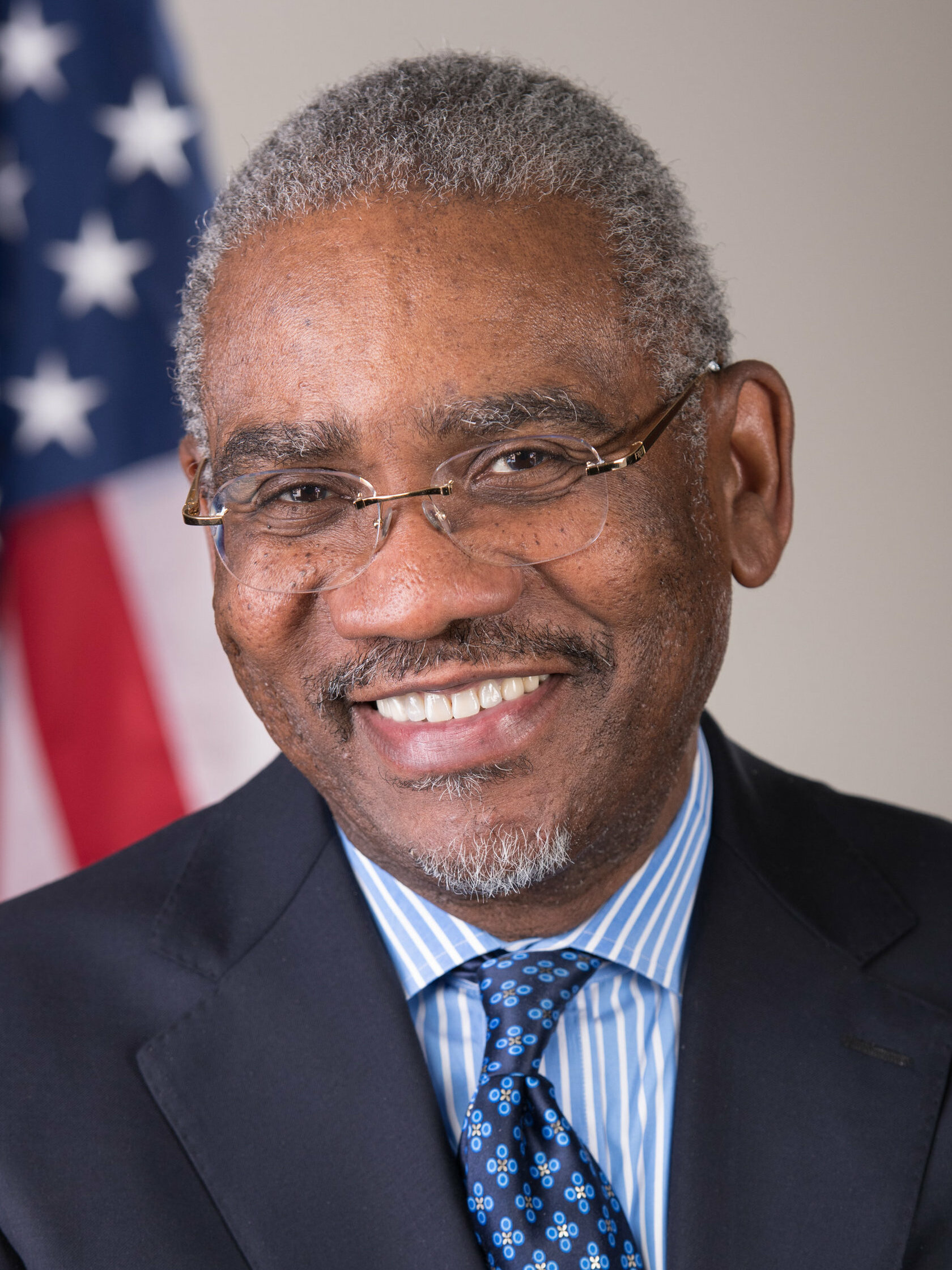
Nominee	Gregory Meeks
Party	Democratic
Popular vote	229,125
Percentage	100.0%
- County results Meeks: >90%
U.S. Representative before election
Gregory Meeks
Democratic
Elected U.S. Representative
Gregory Meeks
Democratic

The 5th district is based mostly in southeastern Queens, and includes all of the Rockaway Peninsula and the neighborhoods of Broad Channel, Cambria Heights, Hollis, Jamaica, Laurelton, Queens Village, Rosedale, Saint Albans, Springfield Gardens, and South Ozone Park, as well as John F. Kennedy International Airport, as well as parts of Nassau County including Inwood and portions of Valley Stream and Elmont. The incumbent was Democrat Gregory Meeks, who was re-elected unopposed in 2018.

=== Democratic primary ===
==== Candidates ====
===== Declared =====
- Shaniyat Chowdhury, U.S. Marine Corps veteran and bartender
- Gregory Meeks, incumbent U.S. representative

===== Endorsements =====
Shaniyat Chowdhury

Organizations

- Brand New Congress
Gregory Meeks

Organizations

- J Street PAC
- Planned Parenthood Action Fund
- Public Employees Federation
- Sierra Club

==== Primary results ====
Democratic primary results
Party	Candidate	Votes	%
Democratic	Gregory Meeks (incumbent)	50,044	75.8
Democratic	Shaniyat Chowdhury	15,951	24.2
Total votes		65,995	100.0

=== Independents ===
==== Candidates ====
===== Declared =====
- Amit Lal, logistics coordinator

=== General election ===
==== Predictions ====
Source	Ranking	As of
The Cook Political Report	Safe D	July 2, 2020
Inside Elections	Safe D	June 2, 2020
Sabato's Crystal Ball	Safe D	July 2, 2020
Politico	Safe D	April 19, 2020
Daily Kos	Safe D	June 3, 2020
RCP	Safe D	June 9, 2020
Niskanen	Safe D	June 7, 2020

==== Results ====
New York's 5th congressional district, 2020
Party	Candidate	Votes	%
Democratic	Gregory Meeks (incumbent)	229,125	100.0
Total votes		229,125	100.0
Democratic hold			

== District 6 ==
2020 New York's 6th congressional district election
- November 3, 2020
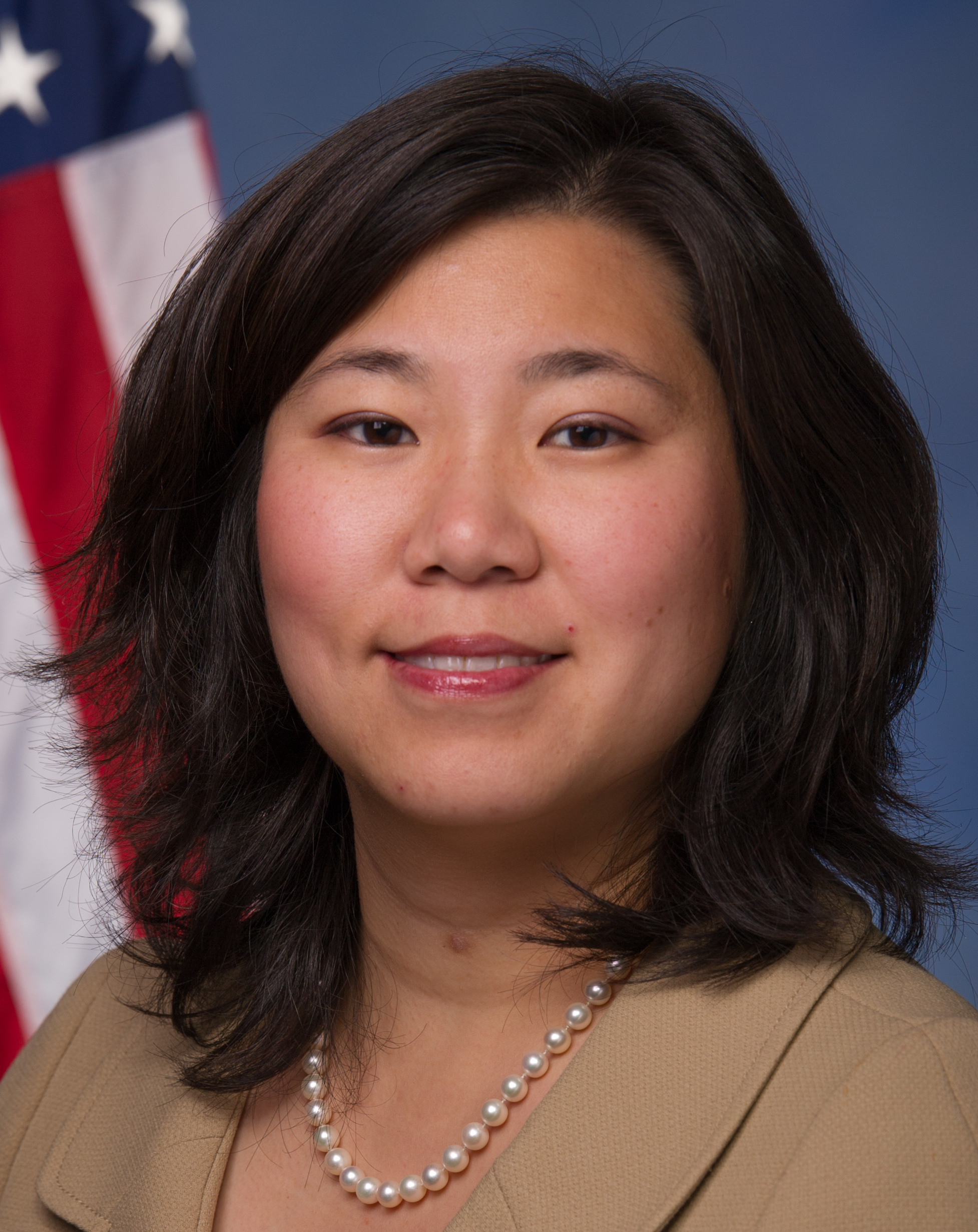

Nominee	Grace Meng	Tom Zmich
Party	Democratic	Republican
Alliance	Working Families	Conservative; Libertarian; Save Our City
Popular vote	158,862	74,829
Percentage	68.0%	32.0%
- County results Meng: 60–70%
U.S. Representative before election
Grace Meng
Democratic
Elected U.S. Representative
Grace Meng
Democratic

The 6th district encompasses northeastern Queens, taking in the neighborhoods of Elmhurst, Flushing, Forest Hills, Kew Gardens, and Bayside. The incumbent was Democrat Grace Meng, who was re-elected in 2018 with 90.9% of the vote, without major-party opposition.

=== Democratic primary ===
==== Candidates ====
===== Declared =====
- Sandra Choi, economic development policy expert
- Mel Gagarin, activist
- Grace Meng, incumbent U.S. representative

==== Endorsements ====
Mel Gagarin

Organizations

- Brand New Congress
- The People for Bernie Sanders
Grace Meng

Individuals

- Andrew Yang, entrepreneur, former Presidential Ambassador for Global Entrepreneurship, former 2020 Democratic presidential candidate

Organizations

- Democratic Majority for Israel PAC
- League of Conservation Voters
- Planned Parenthood Action Fund
- Public Employees Federation
- Sierra Club

==== Primary results ====
Democratic primary results
Party	Candidate	Votes	%
Democratic	Grace Meng (incumbent)	30,759	65.5
Democratic	Mel Gagarin	9,447	20.1
Democratic	Sandra Choi	6,757	14.4
Total votes		46,963	100.0

=== Republican primary ===
==== Candidates ====
===== Declared =====
- Tom Zmich, U.S. Army veteran

=== General election ===
==== Predictions ====
Source	Ranking	As of
The Cook Political Report	Safe D	July 2, 2020
Inside Elections	Safe D	June 2, 2020
Sabato's Crystal Ball	Safe D	July 2, 2020
Politico	Safe D	April 19, 2020
Daily Kos	Safe D	June 3, 2020
RCP	Safe D	June 9, 2020
Niskanen	Safe D	June 7, 2020

==== Results ====
New York's 6th congressional district, 2020
Party	Candidate	Votes	%
Democratic	Grace Meng	144,149	61.7
Working Families	Grace Meng	14,713	6.3
Total	Grace Meng (incumbent)	158,862	68.0
Republican	Tom Zmich	67,735	29.0
Conservative	Tom Zmich	5,231	2.2
Save Our City	Tom Zmich	1,109	0.5
Libertarian	Tom Zmich	754	0.3
Total	Tom Zmich	74,829	32.0
Total votes		233,691	100.0
Democratic hold			

== District 7 ==
2020 New York's 7th congressional district election
- November 3, 2020
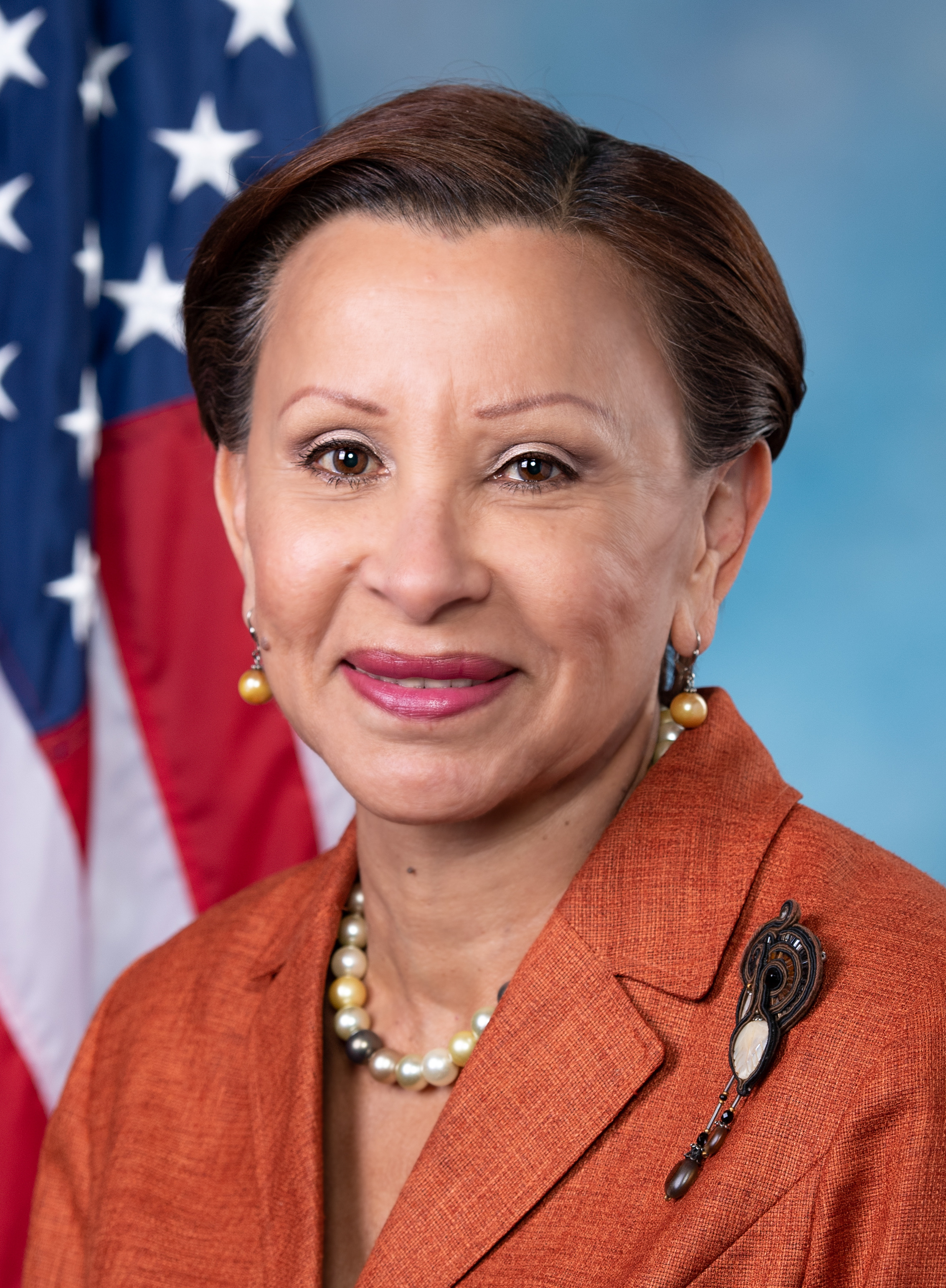

Nominee	Nydia Velázquez	Brian Kelly
Party	Democratic	Republican
Alliance	Working Families	Conservative
Popular vote	191,073	32,520
Percentage	84.9%	14.4%
- County results Velazquez: 70–80% 80–90%
U.S. Representative before election
Nydia Velázquez
Democratic
Elected U.S. Representative
Nydia Velázquez
Democratic

The 7th district takes in the Queens neighborhoods of Maspeth, Ridgewood, and Woodhaven; the Brooklyn neighborhoods of Brooklyn Heights, Boerum Hill, Bushwick, Carroll Gardens, Cobble Hill, Dumbo, East New York, East Williamsburg, Greenpoint, Gowanus, Red Hook, Sunset Park, and Williamsburg; and parts of Manhattan's Lower East Side and East Village. The incumbent was Democrat Nydia Velázquez, who was re-elected with 93.4% of the vote, without major-party opposition.

=== Democratic primary ===
==== Candidates ====
===== Declared =====
- Paperboy Love Prince, rapper
- Nydia Velázquez, incumbent U.S. representative

==== Endorsements ====
Nydia Velázquez

Organizations

- New York League of Conservation Voters
- Public Employees Federation
- Sierra Club

==== Primary results ====
Democratic primary results
Party	Candidate	Votes	%
Democratic	Nydia Velázquez (incumbent)	56,698	80.1
Democratic	Paperboy Love Prince	14,120	19.9
Total votes		70,818	100.0

=== Republican primary ===
==== Candidates ====
===== Declared =====
- Brian Kelly

===== Withdrew =====
- Avery Pereira

=== General election ===
==== Predictions ====
Source	Ranking	As of
The Cook Political Report	Safe D	July 2, 2020
Inside Elections	Safe D	June 2, 2020
Sabato's Crystal Ball	Safe D	July 2, 2020
Politico	Safe D	April 19, 2020
Daily Kos	Safe D	June 3, 2020
RCP	Safe D	June 9, 2020
Niskanen	Safe D	June 7, 2020

==== Results ====
New York's 7th congressional district, 2020
Party	Candidate	Votes	%
Democratic	Nydia Velázquez	156,889	69.7
Working Families	Nydia Velázquez	34,184	15.2
Total	Nydia Velázquez (incumbent)	191,073	84.9
Republican	Brian Kelly	29,404	13.1
Conservative	Brian Kelly	3,116	1.3
Total	Brian Kelly	32,520	14.4
Libertarian	Gilbert Midonnet	1,522	0.7
Total votes		225,115	100.0
Democratic hold			

== District 8 ==
2020 New York's 8th congressional district election
- November 3, 2020
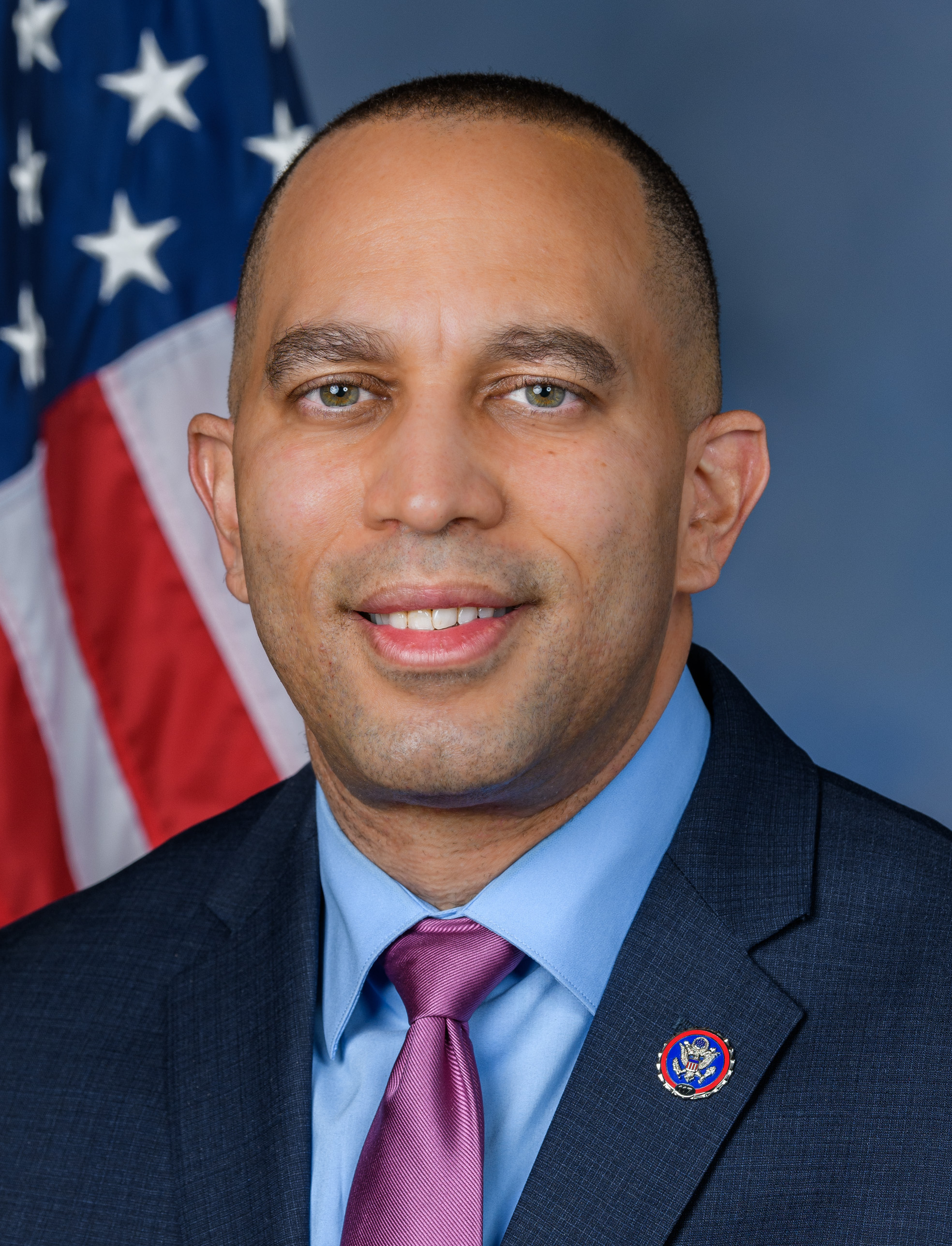

Nominee	Hakeem Jeffries	Garfield Wallace
Party	Democratic	Republican
Alliance	Working Families	Conservative
Popular vote	234,933	42,007
Percentage	84.8%	15.2%
- County results Jeffries: 50–60% 80–90%
U.S. Representative before election
Hakeem Jeffries
Democratic
Elected U.S. Representative
Hakeem Jeffries
Democratic

The 8th district is centered around eastern Brooklyn, taking in Downtown Brooklyn, Bed-Stuy, Canarsie, and Coney Island, as well as a small portion of Queens encompassing Howard Beach. The incumbent was Democrat Hakeem Jeffries, who was re-elected with 94.3% of the vote, without major-party opposition.

=== Democratic primary ===
==== Candidates ====
===== Declared =====
- Hakeem Jeffries, incumbent U.S. representative

==== Endorsements ====
Hakeem Jeffries

Organizations

- New York League of Conservation Voters

Labor unions

- Public Employees Federation

=== Republican primary ===
==== Candidates ====
===== Declared =====
- Garfield Wallace

=== General election ===
==== Predictions ====
Source	Ranking	As of
The Cook Political Report	Safe D	July 2, 2020
Inside Elections	Safe D	June 2, 2020
Sabato's Crystal Ball	Safe D	July 2, 2020
Politico	Safe D	April 19, 2020
Daily Kos	Safe D	June 3, 2020
RCP	Safe D	June 9, 2020
Niskanen	Safe D	June 7, 2020

==== Results ====
New York's 8th congressional district, 2020
Party	Candidate	Votes	%
Democratic	Hakeem Jeffries	207,111	74.8
Working Families	Hakeem Jeffries	27,822	10.0
Total	Hakeem Jeffries (incumbent)	234,933	84.8
Republican	Garfield Wallace	39,124	14.1
Conservative	Garfield Wallace	2,883	1.1
Total	Garfield Wallace	42,007	15.2
Total votes		276,940	100.0
Democratic hold			

== District 9 ==
2020 New York's 9th congressional district election
- November 3, 2020
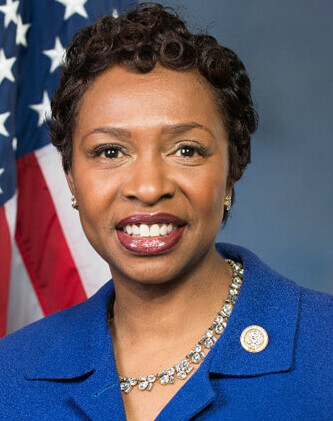

Nominee	Yvette Clarke	Constantin Jean-Pierre
Party	Democratic	Republican
Alliance	Working Families	Conservative
Popular vote	230,221	43,950
Percentage	83.1%	15.9%
- County results Clarke: 80–90%
U.S. Representative before election
Yvette Clarke
Democratic
Elected U.S. Representative
Yvette Clarke
Democratic

The 9th district encompasses Central and Southern Brooklyn, and includes the neighborhoods of Brownsville, Crown Heights, East Flatbush, Flatbush, Kensington, Park Slope, Prospect Heights, Midwood, Sheepshead Bay, Marine Park, Gerritsen Beach and Prospect Lefferts Gardens. Prospect Park, Grand Army Plaza and the Grand Army Plaza Greenmarket. The incumbent was Democrat Yvette Clarke, who was re-elected with 89.3% of the vote in 2018.

=== Democratic primary ===
==== Candidates ====
===== Declared =====
- Adem Bunkeddeko, community organizer and candidate for New York's 9th congressional district in 2018
- Yvette Clarke, incumbent U.S. representative
- Chaim Deutsch, New York City councilman
- Lutchi Gayot, business owner and Republican nominee for New York's 9th congressional district in 2018
- Isiah James, U.S. Army veteran and community organizer

==== Did not qualify for ballot access ====
- Michael Hiller, plaintiff litigator
- Alex Hubbard, data scientist

==== Endorsements ====
Adem Bunkeddeko (D)

Organizations

- Indivisible
- United Auto Workers Region 9A

Newspapers and media

- The New York Times
Yvette Clarke (D)

U.S. representatives

- Hakeem Jeffries, U.S. representative from New York

State legislators

- Rodneyse Bichotte, member of the New York State Assembly
- Zellnor Myrie, New York State Senator

Local officials

- Corey Johnson, member of the New York City Council
- Scott Stringer, New York City Comptroller

Organizations

- End Citizens United
- J Street PAC
- League of Conservation Voters
- Let America Vote
- Planned Parenthood Action Fund
- Sierra Club
- Stonewall Democrats NYC

Unions

- 32BJ SEIU
- Communications Workers of America - District 1
- Public Employees Federation
- Retail, Wholesale and Department Store Union
- Teamsters Local 237
- Transport Workers Union of America - Local 100

Newspapers and media

- New York Daily News
Chaim Deutsch (D)

State legislators

- David Storobin, former New York state Senator

Local officials

- Rubén Díaz Sr., New York City Councilman and former New York state Senator

Organizations

- Chesed Shel Emes
- Misaskim

Unions

- Detectives' Endowment Association
- Police Benevolent Association of the City of New York

Newspapers and media

- The Jewish Press
Isiah James (D)

Organizations

- Brand New Congress

==== Primary results ====
Democratic primary results
Party	Candidate	Votes	%
Democratic	Yvette Clarke (incumbent)	52,293	54.3
Democratic	Adem Bunkeddeko	23,819	24.7
Democratic	Isiah James	10,010	10.4
Democratic	Chaim Deutsch	9,383	9.7
Democratic	Lutchi Gayot	843	0.9
Total votes		96,348	100.0

=== Republican primary ===
==== Candidates ====
===== Declared =====
- Constantin Jean-Pierre, nonprofit executive

=== Serve America Movement ===
==== Candidates ====
===== Declared =====
- Joel Anabilah-Azumah, businessman and Reform candidate for New York's 9th congressional district in 2018

=== General election ===
==== Predictions ====
Source	Ranking	As of
The Cook Political Report	Safe D	July 2, 2020
Inside Elections	Safe D	June 2, 2020
Sabato's Crystal Ball	Safe D	July 2, 2020
Politico	Safe D	April 19, 2020
Daily Kos	Safe D	June 3, 2020
RCP	Safe D	June 9, 2020
Niskanen	Safe D	June 7, 2020

==== Results ====
New York's 9th congressional district, 2020
Party	Candidate	Votes	%
Democratic	Yvette Clarke	195,758	70.7
Working Families	Yvette Clarke	34,463	12.4
Total	Yvette Clarke (incumbent)	230,221	83.1
Republican	Constantin Jean-Pierre	40,110	14.5
Conservative	Constantin Jean-Pierre	3,840	1.4
Total	Constantin Jean-Pierre	43,950	15.9
Libertarian	Gary Popkin	1,644	0.6
SAM	Joel Anabilah-Azumah	1,052	0.4
Total votes		276,867	100.0
Democratic hold			

== District 10 ==
2020 New York's 10th congressional district election
- November 3, 2020
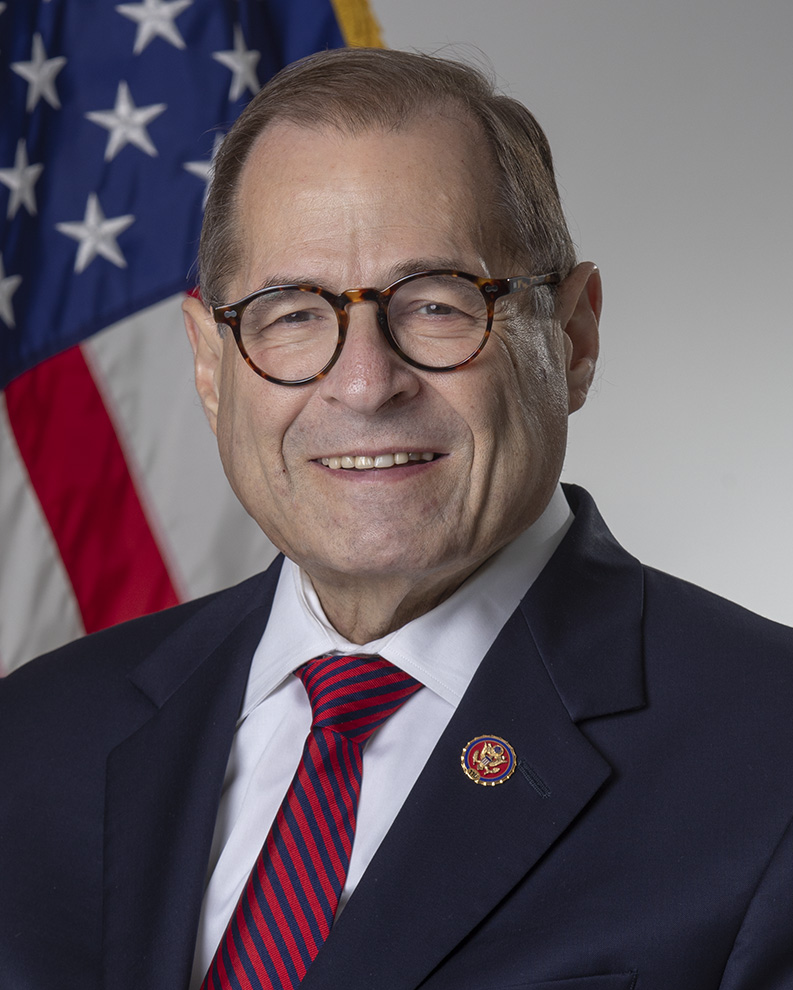

Nominee	Jerry Nadler	Cathy Bernstein
Party	Democratic	Republican
Alliance	Working Families	Conservative
Popular vote	206,310	66,889
Percentage	74.6%	24.2%
- County results Nadler: 80–90% Bernstein: 50–60%
U.S. Representative before election
Jerry Nadler
Democratic
Elected U.S. Representative
Jerry Nadler
Democratic

The 10th district stretches across the southern part of Morningside Heights, the Upper West Side, the west side of Midtown Manhattan, the west side of Lower Manhattan including Greenwich Village and the Financial District, and parts of southern Brooklyn, including Borough Park. The incumbent was Democrat Jerry Nadler, who was re-elected with 82.1% of the vote in 2018.

=== Democratic primary ===
==== Candidates ====
===== Declared =====
- Lindsey Boylan, former Deputy Secretary for Economic Development and Special Advisor to the Governor
- Jonathan Herzog, Harvard Law School student and former staffer for Andrew Yang's presidential campaign
- Jerry Nadler, incumbent U.S. representative

===== Did not qualify for ballot access =====
- Darryl Hendricks, personal trainer
- Holly Lynch, former advertising executive
- Robert Wyman, co-founder of a geothermal heating business

===== Withdrew =====
- Amanda Frankel

==== Debates ====
Host network	Date	Link(s)	Participants		
Host network	Date	Link(s)	Lindsey Boylan	Jonathan Herzog	Jerry Nadler
Spectrum News NY1	June 17, 2020		Present	Present	Present

==== Endorsements ====
Lindsey Boylan

Organizations

- Brand New Congress
Jonathan Herzog

Politicians

- Andrew Yang, businessman, entrepreneur, non-profit leader and 2020 Presidential Candidate

Individuals

Jerry Nadler

US senators

- Elizabeth Warren, U.S. senator from Massachusetts (2013–present); former 2020 presidential candidate

US representatives

- Alexandria Ocasio-Cortez, U.S. representative from New York (2019–present)

Organizations

- Brady Campaign
- Coalition to Stop Gun Violence
- Democratic Majority for Israel PAC
- Everytown for Gun Safety
- Giffords
- Humane Society
- NARAL Pro-Choice America
- New York League of Conservation Voters
- Planned Parenthood Action Fund
- Sierra Club
- Stonewall Democrats NYC
- Sunrise Movement NYC

Unions

- Communications Workers of America
- Public Employees Federation
- Retail, Wholesale and Department Store Union

Political parties

- Working Families Party

Newspapers and media

- New York Daily News
- The New York Times

==== Primary results ====
Democratic primary results
Party	Candidate	Votes	%
Democratic	Jerry Nadler (incumbent)	51,054	67.7
Democratic	Lindsey Boylan	16,511	21.9
Democratic	Jonathan Herzog	7,829	10.4
Total votes		75,394	100.0

=== Republican primary ===
==== Candidates ====
===== Declared =====
- Cathy Bernstein, financial advisor

==== Endorsements ====
Dylan Stevenson

Organizations

- The New York Young Republican Club

=== Independents ===
==== Candidates ====
===== Declared =====
- Jeanne Nigro, self-help minister

=== General election ===
==== Predictions ====
Source	Ranking	As of
The Cook Political Report	Safe D	July 2, 2020
Inside Elections	Safe D	June 2, 2020
Sabato's Crystal Ball	Safe D	July 2, 2020
Politico	Safe D	April 19, 2020
Daily Kos	Safe D	June 3, 2020
RCP	Safe D	June 9, 2020
Niskanen	Safe D	June 7, 2020

==== Results ====
New York's 10th congressional district, 2020
Party	Candidate	Votes	%
Democratic	Jerry Nadler	181,215	65.5
Working Families	Jerry Nadler	25,095	9.1
Total	Jerry Nadler (incumbent)	206,310	74.6
Republican	Cathy Bernstein	61,045	22.1
Conservative	Cathy Bernstein	5,844	2.1
Total	Cathy Bernstein	66,889	24.2
Libertarian	Michael Madrid	3,370	1.2
Total votes		276,569	100.0
Democratic hold			

== District 11 ==
2020 New York's 11th congressional district election
- November 3, 2020
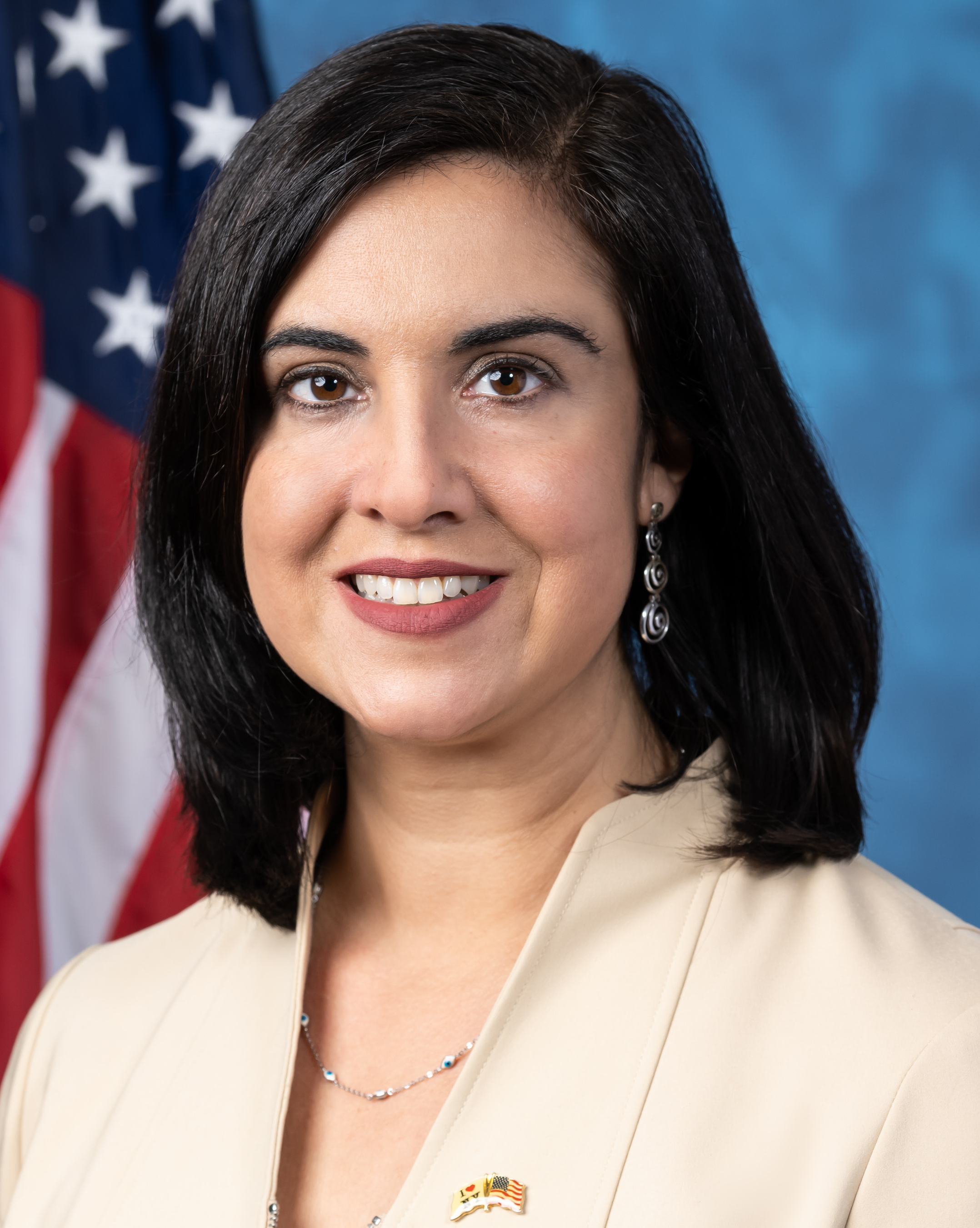

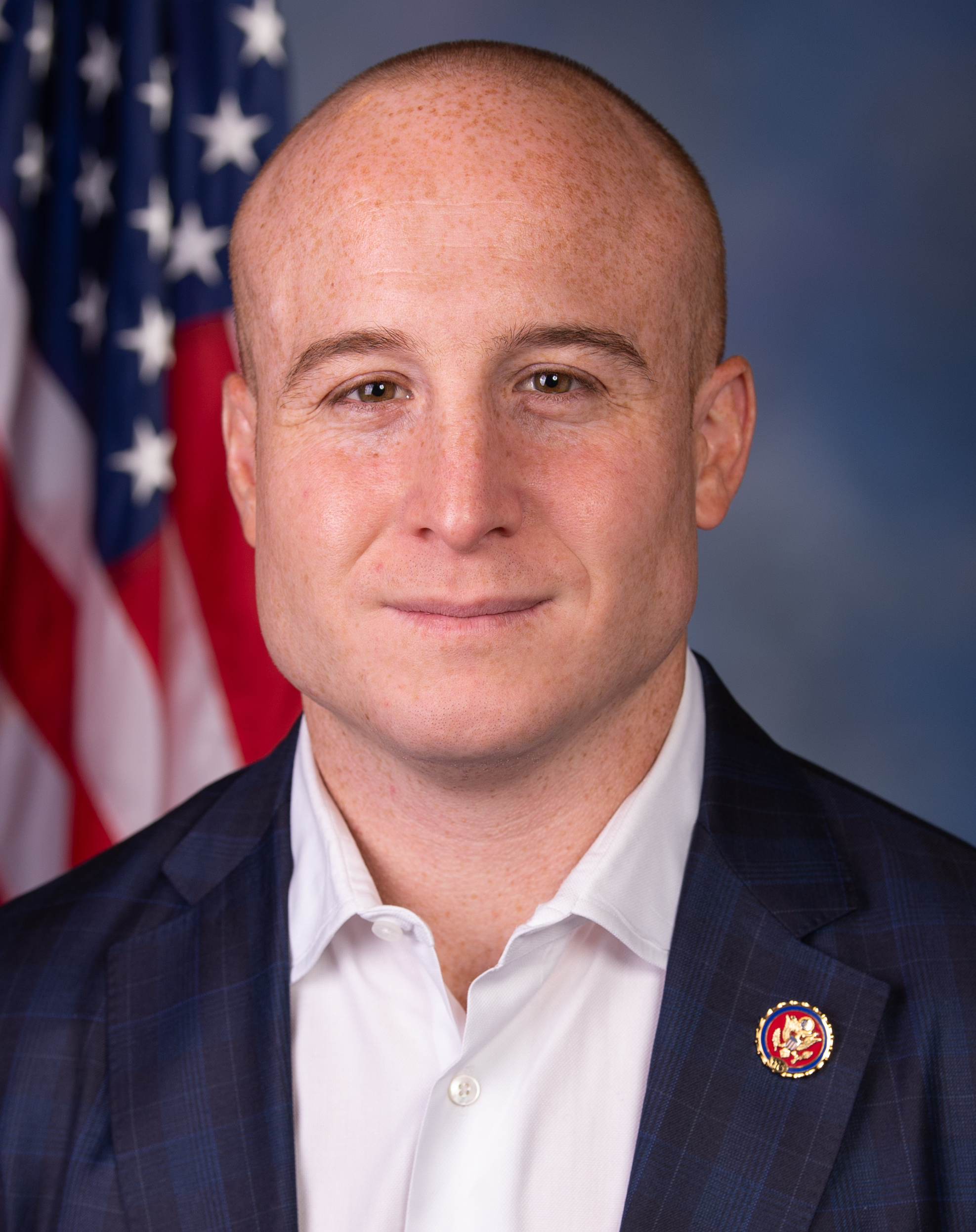
Nominee	Nicole Malliotakis	Max Rose
Party	Republican	Democratic
Alliance	Conservative	Independence
Popular vote	155,608	137,198
Percentage	53.2%	46.8%
- County results Malliotakis: 50–60% Rose: 50–60%
U.S. Representative before election
Max Rose
Democratic
Elected U.S. Representative
Nicole Malliotakis
Republican

The 11th district contains the entirety of Staten Island and parts of southern Brooklyn, including the neighborhoods of Bay Ridge, Bath Beach, Dyker Heights, southwestern Gravesend, western Sheepshead Bay, and parts of southern Bensonhurst. The incumbent was Democrat Max Rose, who flipped the district and was elected with 53.0% of the vote in 2018, only the second time the House district flipped blue for the Democratic Party since Republicans won the seat in 1980.

Based on city and state-reported election night results, with all election districts reporting, in 2020 the traditionally conservative 11th district reverted to the Republican Party. While polls had predicted a close race, Conservative/Republican challenger Assemblywoman Nicole Malliotakis defeated Democratic freshman incumbent Rose to win the seat back for the GOP by a 6.4 point margin. Malliotakis earned 53.2 percent of the vote in the district over Rose's 46.8 percent. Malliotakis won her home borough of Staten Island while Rose won the Brooklyn portion of the district. Rose formally conceded the race to Malliotakis on November 12. Final recanvassing and certification of results happened within 25 days of the November 3 general election.

=== Democratic primary ===
==== Declared ====
- Max Rose, U.S. representative

===== Withdrawn =====
- Richard-Olivier Marius, former volunteer for Max Rose

==== Endorsements ====
Max Rose

U.S. presidents

- Barack Obama, 44th president of the United States

Organizations

- Brady Campaign
- End Citizens United
- Everytown for Gun Safety
- Giffords
- Human Rights Campaign
- Humane Society
- League of Conservation Voters
- NARAL Pro-Choice America
- Planned Parenthood Action Fund
- Sierra Club

Unions

- Communications Workers of America
- Public Employees Federation

=== Republican primary ===
==== Candidates ====
===== Declared =====
- Joe Caldarera, former special victims prosecutor
- Nicole Malliotakis, state assemblywoman and nominee for mayor of New York City in 2017

===== Withdrawn =====
- Joey Saladino, YouTube content creator (endorsed Caldarera)

===== Declined =====
- Joe Borelli, New York City councilman
- Michael Grimm, former U.S. representative

==== Endorsements ====
Joe Calaredra

Organizations

- NRA Political Victory Fund

Individuals

- Joey Saladino, YouTuber
Nicole Malliotakis

Federal officials

- Liz Cheney, U.S. representative (WY-AL) and House Republican Conference chair
- Peter King, U.S. representative (NY-02)
- Elise Stefanik, U.S. representative (NY-21)
- Donald Trump, 45th president of the United States

Local officials

- Rudy Giuliani, 2008 Republican presidential candidate and former mayor of New York City (1994–2001)
- Steven Matteo, New York City Council minority leader

Organizations

- American Postal Workers Union Local 231
- MTA Police Benevolent Association
- Police Benevolent Association of the City of New York
- Republican Main Street Partnership PAC
- Sergeants Benevolent Association
- Tea Party Express

Individuals

- James Dolan, owner of the New York Knicks
- Nick Langworthy, New York Republican Party chair

Newspapers

- The Jewish Press

==== Primary results ====
Republican primary results
Party	Candidate	Votes	%
Republican	Nicole Malliotakis	15,697	69.0
Republican	Joe Caldarera	7,046	31.0
Total votes		22,743	100.0

=== General election ===
==== Predictions ====
Source	Ranking	As of
The Cook Political Report	Tossup	August 21, 2020
Inside Elections	Tossup	September 4, 2020
Sabato's Crystal Ball	Lean D	November 2, 2020
Politico	Tossup	April 19, 2020
Daily Kos	Tossup	June 3, 2020
RCP	Tossup	June 9, 2020
Niskanen	Lean D	June 7, 2020

==== Polling ====
Poll source	Date(s) administered	Sample size	Margin of error	Max Rose (D)	Nicole Malliotakis (R)	Other	Undecided
Marist College/NBC	October 19–21, 2020	650 (LV)	± 4.7%	46%	48%	1%	5%

==== Results ====
New York's 11th congressional district, 2020
Party	Candidate	Votes	%
Republican	Nicole Malliotakis	143,420	49.0
Conservative	Nicole Malliotakis	12,188	4.2
Total	Nicole Malliotakis	155,608	53.2
Democratic	Max Rose	134,625	46.0
Independence	Max Rose	2,573	0.8
Total	Max Rose (incumbent)	137,198	46.8
Total votes		292,806	100.0
Republican gain from Democratic			

== District 12 ==
2020 New York's 12th congressional district election
- November 3, 2020
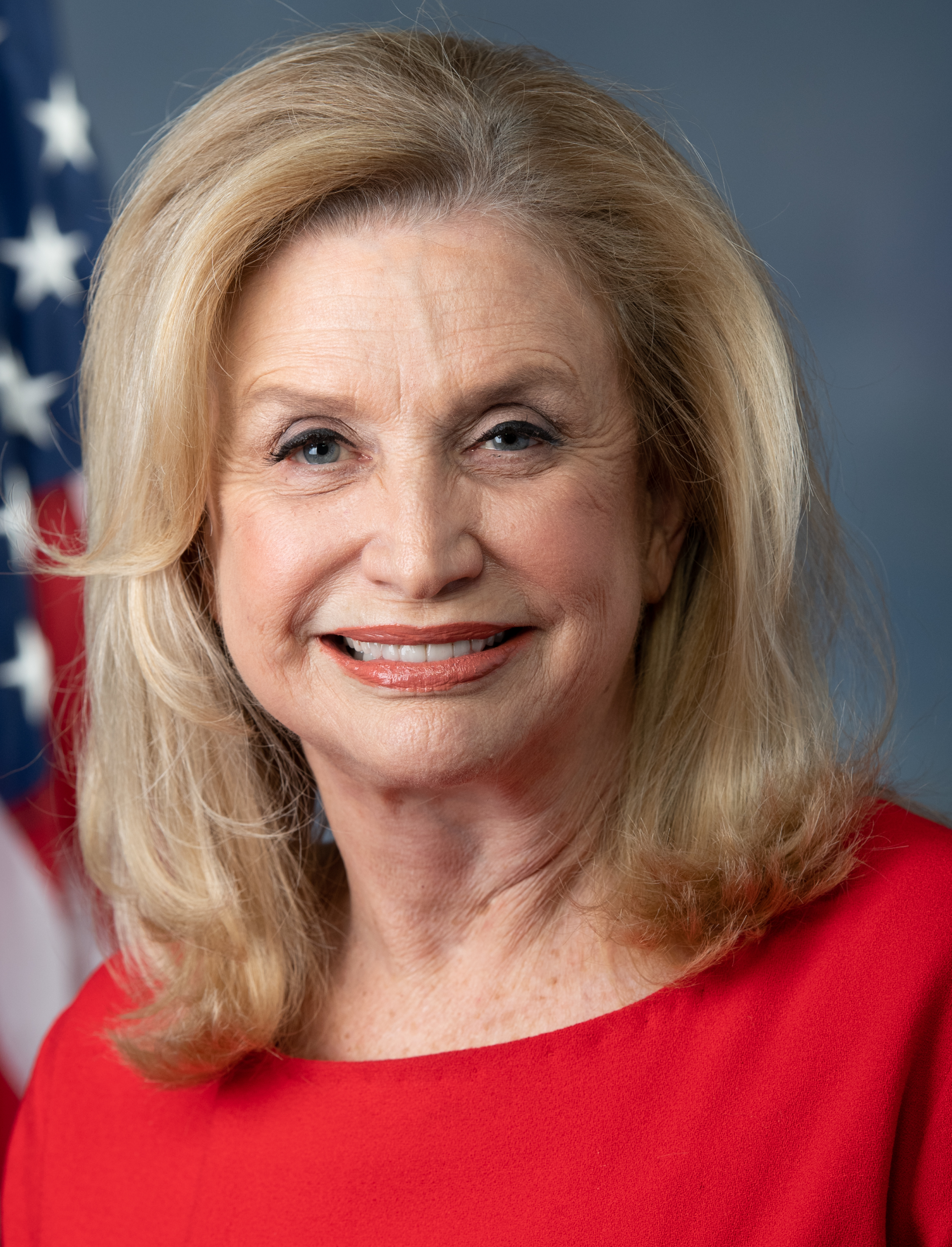

Nominee	Carolyn Maloney	Carlos Santiago-Cano
Party	Democratic	Republican
Alliance		Conservative
Popular vote	265,172	53,061
Percentage	82.3%	16.5%
- County results Maloney: 80–90%
U.S. Representative before election
Carolyn Maloney
Democratic
Elected U.S. Representative
Carolyn Maloney
Democratic

The 12th district includes several neighborhoods in the East Side of Manhattan, the Greenpoint section of Brooklyn, western Queens, including Astoria and Long Island City. The incumbent was Democrat Carolyn Maloney, who was re-elected with 86.4% of the vote in 2018.

=== Democratic primary ===
==== Candidates ====
===== Declared =====
- Lauren Ashcraft, JPMorgan Chase project manager, activist, and comedian
- Peter Harrison, housing activist
- Carolyn Maloney, incumbent U.S. representative
- Suraj Patel, professor at New York University, lawyer, and candidate for New York's 12th congressional district in 2018

===== Withdrawn =====
- Erica Vladimer, attorney and former New York State Senate staffer

===== Declined =====
- Dawn Smalls, attorney and candidate for New York City Public Advocate in 2019

===== Endorsements =====
Lauren Ashcraft

Individuals

- Marianne Williamson, author and 2020 presidential candidate

Organizations

- Brand New Congress
- Youth Climate Strike - New York
Carolyn Maloney

State elected officials

- Harvey Epstein, New York State Assemblymember (District 74) since 2018
- Deborah J. Glick, New York State Assemblymember (District 66) since 1991
- Richard N. Gottfried, New York State Assemblymember( District 75) since 1971
- Kathy Hochul, Lieutenant Governor of New York since 2015
- Dan Quart, New York State Assemblymember (District 73) since 2011

Local officials

- Ben Kallos, New York City Councilmember (District 5) since 2014
- Christine Quinn, former Speaker of the New York City Council (2006–2013), former New York City Councilmember (1999–2013)

Organizations

- Brady Campaign
- Democratic Majority for Israel PAC
- End Citizens United
- NARAL Pro-Choice America
- New York League of Conservation Voters
- Planned Parenthood Action Fund
- Public Employees Federation
- Sierra Club

Newspapers and media

- The New York Times

==== Primary results ====

Maloney

30–40%
40–50%
50–60%
60–70%
70–80%
80–90%

Patel

30–40%
40–50%
50–60%
60–70%
90–100%

Ashcraft

50–60%

Other

40–50% tie
50% tie
No votes

Democratic primary results
Party	Candidate	Votes	%
Democratic	Carolyn Maloney (incumbent)	40,362	42.8
Democratic	Suraj Patel	37,106	39.4
Democratic	Lauren Ashcraft	12,810	13.6
Democratic	Peter Harrison	4,001	4.2
Total votes		94,279	100.0

=== Republican primary ===
==== Candidates ====
===== Declared =====
- Carlos Santiago-Cano, real estate broker

=== General election ===
==== Predictions ====
Source	Ranking	As of
The Cook Political Report	Safe D	July 2, 2020
Inside Elections	Safe D	June 2, 2020
Sabato's Crystal Ball	Safe D	July 2, 2020
Politico	Safe D	April 19, 2020
Daily Kos	Safe D	June 3, 2020
RCP	Safe D	June 9, 2020
Niskanen	Safe D	June 7, 2020

==== Results ====
New York's 12th congressional district, 2020
Party	Candidate	Votes	%
Democratic	Carolyn Maloney (incumbent)	265,172	82.3
Republican	Carlos Santiago-Cano	49,157	15.3
Conservative	Carlos Santiago-Cano	3,904	1.2
Total	Carlos Santiago-Cano	53,061	16.5
Libertarian	Steven Kolln	4,015	1.2
Total votes		322,248	100.0
Democratic hold			

== District 13 ==
2020 New York's 13th congressional district election
- November 3, 2020
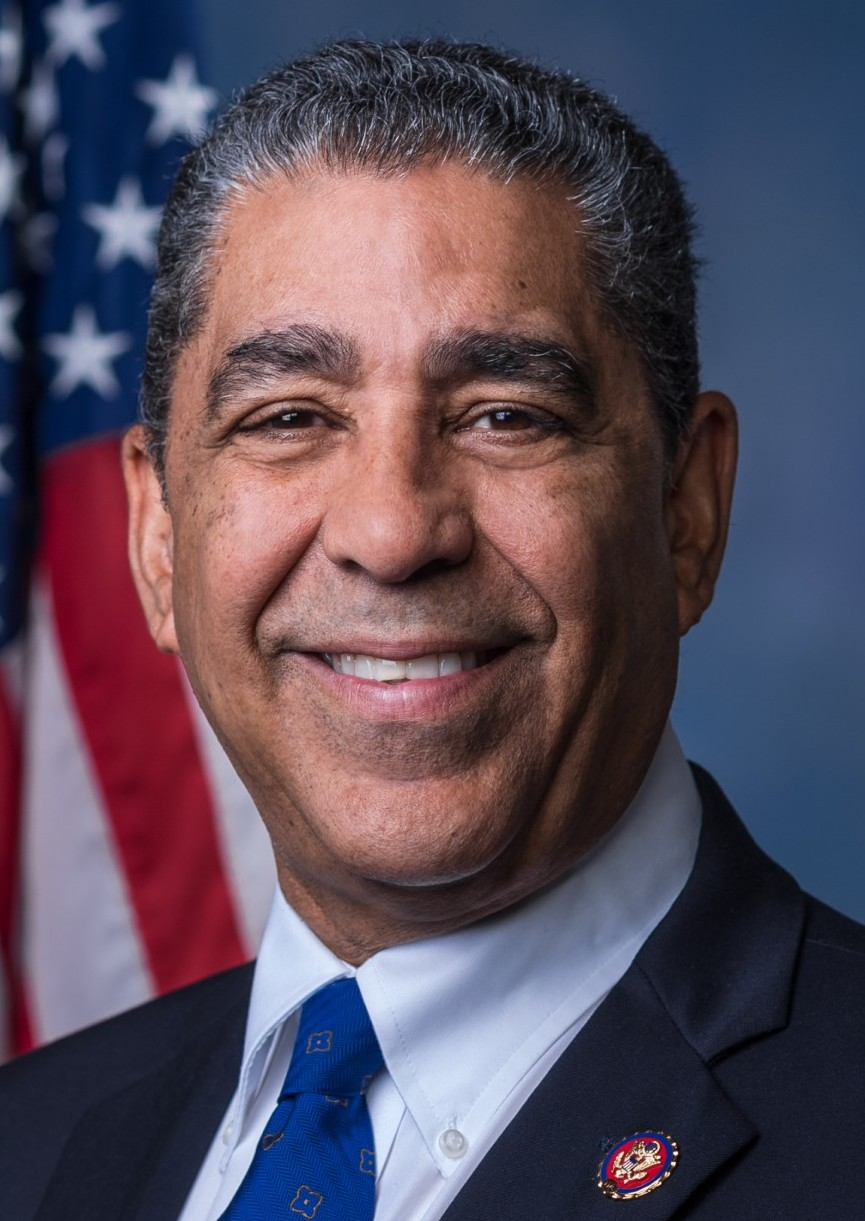

Nominee	Adriano Espaillat	Lovelynn Gwinn
Party	Democratic	Republican
Alliance	Working Families
Popular vote	231,841	19,829
Percentage	90.9%	7.8%
- County results Espaillat: 80–90% >90%
U.S. Representative before election
Adriano Espaillat
Democratic
Elected U.S. Representative
Adriano Espaillat
Democratic

The 13th district encompasses the Upper Manhattan neighborhoods of Harlem, Washington Heights, and Inwood, as well the western Bronx neighborhoods of Kingsbridge and Bedford Park. The incumbent was Democrat Adriano Espaillat, who was re-elected with 94.6% of the vote in 2018.

=== Democratic primary ===
==== Candidates ====
===== Declared =====
- Adriano Espaillat, incumbent U.S. representative
- James Felton Keith, entrepreneur
- Ramon Rodriguez, business etiquette executive

==== Endorsements ====
Adriano Espaillat

Organizations

- League of Conservation Voters
- Planned Parenthood Action Fund
- Sierra Club
- Working Families Party

Unions

- New York AFL–CIO
- New York State United Teachers
- Public Employees Federation
- United Federation of Teachers
James Felton Keith

Individuals

- Andrew Yang, political commentator, entrepreneur, and 2020 Democratic Party presidential primaries candidate

==== Primary results ====
2020 Democratic primary results by precinct Espaillat: 30–40%; 40–50%; 50–60%; 60–70%; 70–80%; 80–90%; 90–100%; Keith: 40–50%; 50–60%; Rodriguez: 40–50%; No votes

Democratic primary results
Party	Candidate	Votes	%
Democratic	Adriano Espaillat (incumbent)	46,066	59.3
Democratic	James Felton Keith	19,799	25.5
Democratic	Ramon Rodriguez	11,859	15.2
Total votes		77,724	100.0

=== Republican primary ===
==== Candidates ====
===== Declared =====
- Lovelynn Gwinn, landlord

=== General election ===
==== Predictions ====
Source	Ranking	As of
The Cook Political Report	Safe D	July 2, 2020
Inside Elections	Safe D	June 2, 2020
Sabato's Crystal Ball	Safe D	July 2, 2020
Politico	Safe D	April 19, 2020
Daily Kos	Safe D	June 3, 2020
RCP	Safe D	June 9, 2020
Niskanen	Safe D	June 7, 2020

==== Results ====
New York's 13th congressional district, 2020
Party	Candidate	Votes	%
Democratic	Adriano Espaillat	202,916	79.6
Working Families	Adriano Espaillat	28,925	11.3
Total	Adriano Espaillat (incumbent)	231,841	90.9
Republican	Lovelynn Gwinn	19,829	7.8
Conservative	Christopher Morris-Perry	3,295	1.3
Total votes		254,965	100.0
Democratic hold			

== District 14 ==
2020 New York's 14th congressional district election
- November 3, 2020
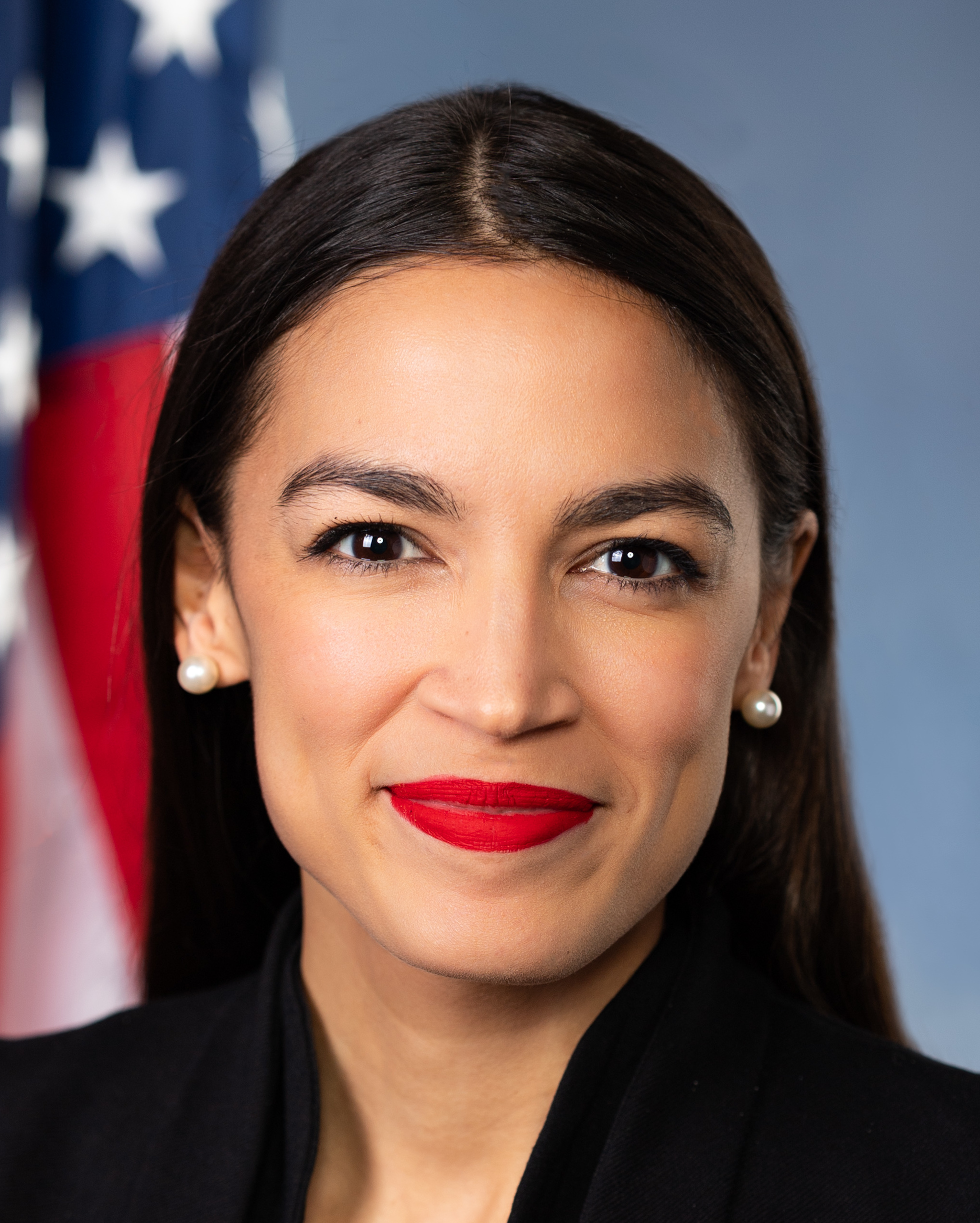

Candidate	Alexandria Ocasio-Cortez	John Cummings
Party	Democratic	Republican
Alliance		Conservative
Popular vote	152,661	58,440
Percentage	71.6%	27.4%
- County results Ocasio-Cortez: 60–70% 70–80%
U.S. Representative before election
Alexandria Ocasio-Cortez
Democratic
Elected U.S. Representative
Alexandria Ocasio-Cortez
Democratic

The 14th district covers the eastern part of the Bronx and part of north-central Queens, including the neighborhoods of College Point, Corona, East Elmhurst, Jackson Heights, and Woodside. The incumbent was Democrat Alexandria Ocasio-Cortez, who had been elected with 78.2% of the vote in 2018. Ocasio-Cortez easily won the Democratic primary against former CNBC anchor Michelle Caruso-Cabrera. Her large margin of victory was partly attributed by Fortune's Rey Mashayekhi to her substantial fundraising advantage and focus on digital advertising.

=== Democratic primary ===
==== Candidates ====
===== Declared =====
- Michelle Caruso-Cabrera, business news reporter
- Badrun Khan, activist
- Alexandria Ocasio-Cortez, incumbent U.S. representative
- Sam Sloan, perennial candidate and chess player

===== Withdrawn =====
- Fernando Cabrera, New York City councillor
- James Dillon, activist
- Jose Velazquez, former ESL student

===== Declined =====
- Elizabeth Crowley, former New York City councilwoman (running for Queens borough president)
- Joe Crowley, former U.S. representative (NY-14)
- Julia Salazar, state senator
- Jimmy Van Bramer, New York City councilman

==== Debates ====
Host network	Date	Link(s)	Participants			
Host network	Date	Link(s)	Alexandria Ocasio-Cortez	Michelle Caruso-Cabrera	Badrun Khan	Sam Sloan
BronxNet	May 18, 2020		Present	Present	Present	Present
Spectrum News NY1	June 4, 2020		Present	Present	Present	Absent

===== Endorsements =====
Fernando Cabrera (withdrew)

Newspapers and media

- ~~The Jewish Press~~ (switched endorsement to Caruso-Cabrera)
Michelle Caruso-Cabrera

Organizations

- United States Chamber of Commerce
Alexandria Ocasio-Cortez

Executive officials

- Robert Reich, U.S. Secretary of Labor (1993–1997)

Federal officials

- Grace Meng, U.S. representative from NY-06
- Nancy Pelosi, Representative from California (1987–present) and Speaker of the House (2007–2011, 2019–present)
- Bernie Sanders, U.S. senator from Vermont (Independent)

Labor unions

- National Nurses United
- Public Employees Federation

Organizations

- Brand New Congress
- Democratic Socialists of America
- Justice Democrats
- League of Conservation Voters
- Sierra Club
- Sunrise Movement
- Working Families Party

Newspapers and media

- The New York Times

==== Primary results ====
Democratic primary results
Party	Candidate	Votes	%
Democratic	Alexandria Ocasio-Cortez (incumbent)	46,582	74.6
Democratic	Michelle Caruso-Cabrera	11,339	18.2
Democratic	Badrun Khan	3,119	5.0
Democratic	Sam Sloan	1,406	2.2
Total votes		62,446	100.0

=== Republican primary ===
==== Candidates ====
===== Declared =====
- John Cummings, former police officer

==== Withdrawn ====
- Jineea Butler
- Miguel Hernandez, construction contractor
- Scherie Murray, businesswoman and candidate for New York State Assembly in 2015
- Ruth Papazian, health and medical writer
- Rey Solano
- Antoine Tucker, businessman (on the ballot as a write-in candidate)

=== General election ===
==== Predictions ====
Source	Ranking	As of
The Cook Political Report	Safe D	July 2, 2020
Inside Elections	Safe D	June 2, 2020
Sabato's Crystal Ball	Safe D	July 2, 2020
Politico	Safe D	April 19, 2020
Daily Kos	Safe D	June 3, 2020
RCP	Safe D	June 9, 2020
Niskanen	Safe D	June 7, 2020

=== Results ===
New York's 14th congressional district, 2020
Party	Candidate	Votes	%
Democratic	Alexandria Ocasio-Cortez (incumbent)	152,661	71.6
Republican	John Cummings	52,477	24.6
Conservative	John Cummings	5,963	2.8
Total	John Cummings	58,440	27.4
SAM	Michelle Caruso-Cabrera	2,000	0.9
Total votes		213,101	100.0
Democratic hold			

== District 15 ==
2020 New York's 15th congressional district election
- November 3, 2020
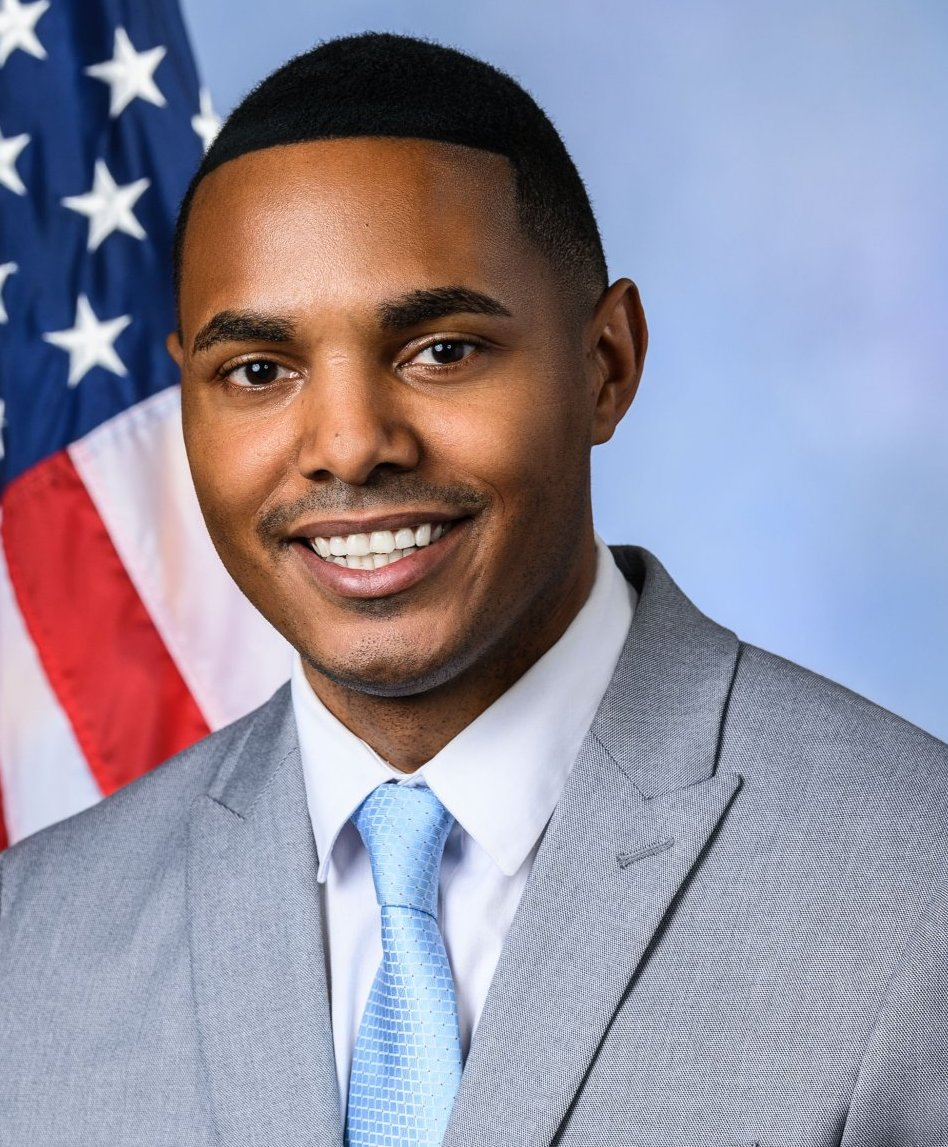

Nominee	Ritchie Torres	Patrick Delices
Party	Democratic	Republican
Alliance		Conservative
Popular vote	169,533	21,221
Percentage	88.9%	11.1%
- County results Torres: 80–90%
U.S. Representative before election
José E. Serrano
Democratic
Elected U.S. Representative
Ritchie Torres
Democratic

The 15th district is located entirely within the Bronx, including the neighborhoods of Hunts Point, Castle Hill, and Tremont. According to the Cook Partisan Voting Index, the 15th district is one of the most Democratic congressional districts in the country, with a PVI of D+39. As a result, victory in the Democratic primary in the district would be tantamount to election. The incumbent Democrat, José E. Serrano, announced on March 25, 2019, that he had been diagnosed with Parkinson's disease and would not be seeking re-election.

=== Democratic primary ===
==== Candidates ====
===== Declared =====
- Frangell Basora, former congressional intern
- Michael Blake, state assemblyman and vice chair of the Democratic National Committee
- Rubén Díaz Sr., New York City councilman
- Mark Escoffery-Bey, small business owner
- Samelys López, progressive activist and co-founder of Bronx Progressives
- Melissa Mark-Viverito, former speaker of the New York City Council
- Chivona Newsome, finance specialist, co-founder of Black Lives Matter of Greater NY
- Jonathan Ortiz, New York City financial advisor
- Julio Pabon, marketing executive
- Tomás Ramos, director of the Bronx River Community Center
- Ydanis Rodríguez, New York City councilman
- Marlene Tapper, political consultant
- Ritchie Torres, New York City councilman

===== Withdrawn =====
- Marlene Cintron, president of the Bronx Overall Economic Development Corporation
- David P. Franks Jr., New York City police Sergeant (write-in)

===== Declined =====
- Elías Alcántara, former White House senior associate director for intergovernmental affairs
- Marcos Crespo, state assemblyman and chair of the Bronx Democratic County Committee
- Nathalia Fernandez, state assemblywoman
- Vanessa Gibson, New York City councilwoman
- Carl Heastie, speaker of the New York Assembly
- Gustavo Rivera, state senator
- Amanda Septimo, former district director for José E. Serrano (running for state assembly)
- Luis R. Sepúlveda, state senator
- José E. Serrano, incumbent U.S. representative
- José M. Serrano, state senator and son of the incumbent
- Eric Stevenson, former state assemblyman

==== Debates ====
Host network	Date	Link(s)	Participants											
Host network	Date	Link(s)	Michael Blake	Rubén Díaz Sr.	Samelys López	Melissa Mark-Viverito	Chivona Newsome	Jonathan Ortiz	Julio Pabon	Tomas Ramos	Ydanis Rodríguez	Ritchie Torres	Frangell Basora	Marlene Tapper
Gotham Gazelle	May 15, 2020		Present	Absent	Present	Present	Present	Absent	Absent	Present	Present	Present	Present	Absent
BronxNet	June 1, 2020		Present	Absent	Present	Present	Present	Present	Present	Present	Present	Present	Present	Present
News 12 The Bronx	June 9, 2020		Present	Absent	Present	Present	Present	Absent	Present	Present	Present	Present	Present	Absent
Spectrum News NY1	June 10, 2020		Present	Absent	Present	Present	Absent	Absent	Absent	Absent	Present	Present	Absent	Absent

==== Endorsements ====
Michael Blake (D)

Federal politicians

- Cory Booker, U.S. senator from New Jersey

Organizations

- Congressional Black Caucus PAC

Individuals

- Jesse Jackson, civil rights leader and politician
- Martin Luther King III, civil rights leader and son of Martin Luther King Jr.
- Keisha Lance Bottoms, Mayor of Atlanta
Rubén Díaz Sr. (D)

Local officials

- Chaim Deutsch, New York City councilman
Samelys Lopez (D)

U.S. senators

- Bernie Sanders, U.S. senator from Vermont (2007–present) (Independent)

U.S. representatives

- Alexandria Ocasio-Cortez, Representative from New York's 14th congressional district

Individuals

- Tiffany Cabán, attorney, political organizer, and 2019 Queens County District Attorney election candidate
- Nomiki Konst, activist, political commentator, and 2019 New York City Public Advocate special election candidate

Organizations

- Jewish Voice for Peace Action
- New American Leaders Action Fund
- New York City Democratic Socialists of America
- Our Revolution
- The People for Bernie Sanders
- Progressive Democrats of America
- Sunrise Movement NYC

Parties

- Working Families Party
Tomas Ramos (D)

Individuals

- Marianne Williamson, former 2020 Democratic presidential candidate

Organizations

- Brand New Congress
Ritchie Torres (D)

U.S. representatives

- David Cicilline, Representative from Rhode Island's 1st congressional district
- Mark Takano, Representative from California's 41st congressional district

Local and statewide politicians

- Brad Lander, New York City council member from Brooklyn

Organizations

- Congressional Hispanic Caucus
- Congressional LGBT Equality Caucus
- End Citizens United
- League of Conservation Voters
- LGBTQ Victory Fund
- LiUNA NY
- NARAL Pro-Choice America
- Public Employees Federation

Newspapers and media

- The New York Times

==== Polling ====
Poll source	Date(s) administered	Sample size	Margin of error	Michael Blake	Rubén Díaz	Ydanis Rodríguez	Ritchie Torres	Melissa Mark-Viverito	Samelys López	Other	Undecided
Data for Progress	May 21–24, 2020	323 (LV)	–	6%	22%	6%	20%	6%	2%	3% (Note: Ortiz, Pabon and Ramos with 1%)	34%

==== Primary results ====

Torres

10–20%
20–30%
30–40%
40–50%
50–60%
60–70%
70–80%
90–100%

Blake

20–30%
30–40%
40–50%
50–60%

Díaz Sr.

20–30%
30–40%
70–80%
90–100%

López

20–30%
30–40%
50–60%

Rodríguez

20–30%
30–40%

Mark-Viverito

30–40%

Newsome

30–40%

Other

<30% tie
30–40% tie
50% tie
No votes

Democratic primary results
Party	Candidate	Votes	%
Democratic	Ritchie Torres	19,090	32.2
Democratic	Michael Blake	10,725	18.1
Democratic	Rubén Díaz Sr.	8,559	14.4
Democratic	Samelys López	8,272	13.9
Democratic	Ydanis Rodríguez	6,291	10.6
Democratic	Melissa Mark-Viverito	2,561	4.3
Democratic	Tomás Ramos	1,442	2.4
Democratic	Chivona Newsome	1,366	2.3
Democratic	Marlene Tapper	392	0.7
Democratic	Julio Pabon	244	0.4
Democratic	Frangell Basora	189	0.3
Democratic	Mark Escoffery-Bay	153	0.3
Total votes		59,284	100.0

=== Republican primary ===
==== Candidates ====
===== Declared =====
- Orlando Molina

=== General election ===
==== Predictions ====
Source	Ranking	As of
The Cook Political Report	Safe D	July 2, 2020
Inside Elections	Safe D	June 2, 2020
Sabato's Crystal Ball	Safe D	July 2, 2020
Politico	Safe D	April 19, 2020
Daily Kos	Safe D	June 3, 2020
RCP	Safe D	June 9, 2020
Niskanen	Safe D	June 7, 2020

==== Results ====
New York's 15th congressional district, 2020
Party	Candidate	Votes	%
Democratic	Ritchie Torres	169,533	88.9
Republican	Patrick Delices	18,984	9.9
Conservative	Patrick Delices	2,237	1.2
Total	Patrick Delices	21,221	11.1
Total votes		190,754	100.0
Democratic hold			

== District 16 ==
2020 New York's 16th congressional district election
- November 3, 2020
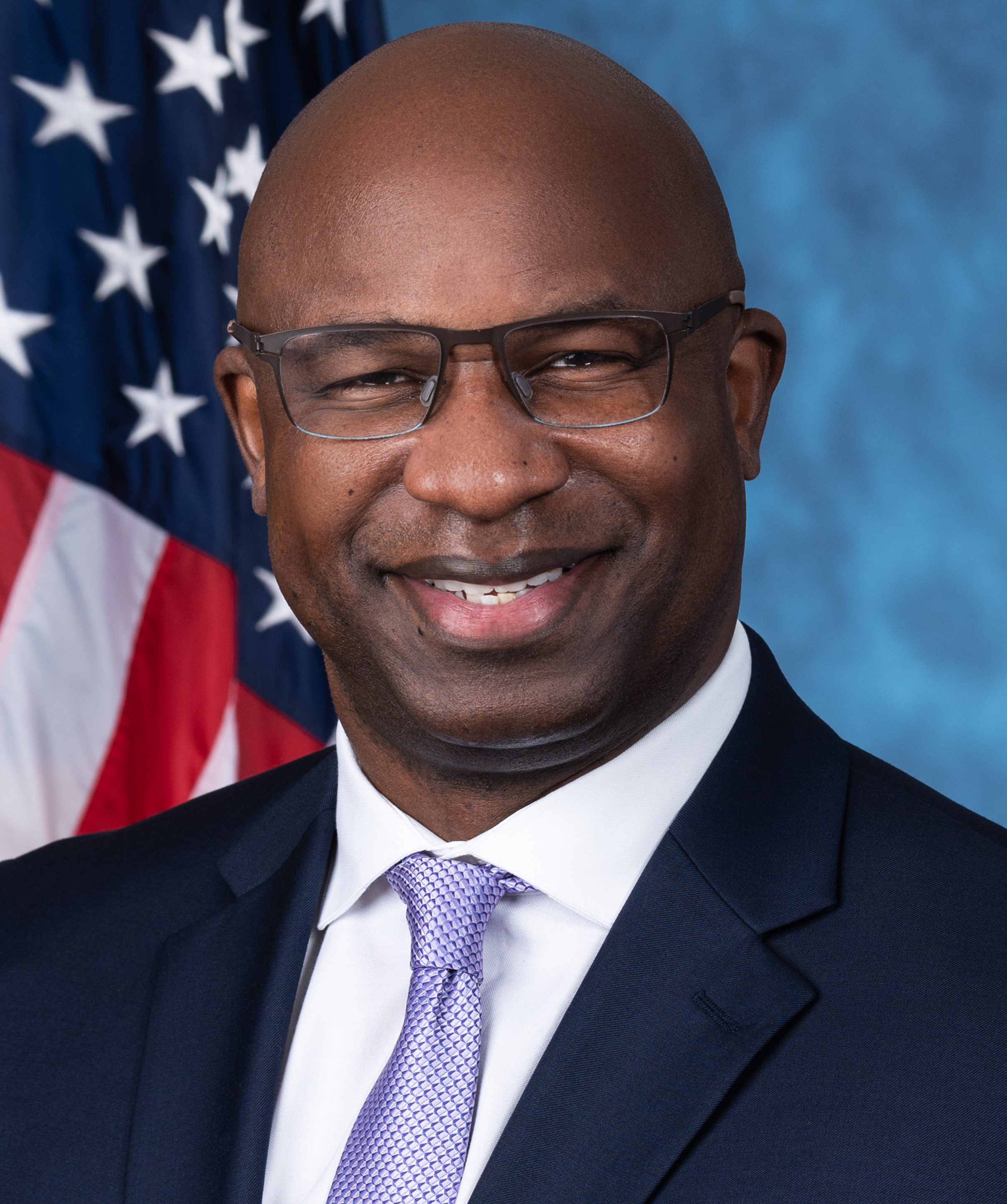

Nominee	Jamaal Bowman	Patrick McManus
Party	Democratic	Conservative
Popular vote	218,514	41,094
Percentage	84.2%	15.8%
- County results Bowman: 80–90% >90%
U.S. Representative before election
Eliot Engel
Democratic
Elected U.S. Representative
Jamaal Bowman
Democratic

The 16th district contains the northern parts of the Bronx and the southern half of Westchester County, including the cities of Mount Vernon, Yonkers, and Rye. The incumbent was Democrat Eliot Engel.

=== Democratic primary ===
==== Candidates ====
===== Declared =====
- Jamaal Bowman, middle school principal
- Eliot Engel, incumbent U.S. representative
- Christopher Fink, tax attorney
- Sammy Ravelo, U.S. Army veteran and retired NYPD lieutenant

===== Withdrawn =====
- Kenny Belvin, political scientist (endorsed Ghebreghiorgis)
- Andom Ghebreghiorgis, special education teacher (endorsed Bowman)

==== Debates ====
Host network	Date	Link(s)	Participants			
Host network	Date	Link(s)	Eliot Engel	Jamaal Bowman	Christopher Fink	Sammy Ravelo
BronxNet	June 2, 2020		Present	Present	Present	Present
Spectrum News NY1	June 9, 2020		Present	Present	Present	Absent

==== Endorsements ====
Jamaal Bowman

U.S. senators

- Bernie Sanders, U.S. senator from Vermont (2007–present); candidate for president in 2020 (Independent)
- Elizabeth Warren, U.S. senator from Massachusetts (2013–present); candidate for president in 2020

U.S. representatives

- Alexandria Ocasio-Cortez, U.S. representative from New York's 14th congressional district (2019–present)
- Katie Porter, U.S. representative from California's 45th congressional district (2019–present)
- Ayanna Pressley, U.S. representative from Massachusetts's 7th congressional district (2019–present)

State officials

- Alessandra Biaggi, state senator from District 34 (2019–present)
- Terry Gipson, former state senator from District 41 (2013–2014); candidate for governor in 2018
- Gustavo Rivera, state senator from District 33 (2011–present)

Municipal officials

- Mark Green, Public Advocate of New York City, New York (1994–2001)
- Brad Lander, New York City Council Member from District 39 (2010–present)
- Scott Stringer, New York City Comptroller since 2014
- Jumaane Williams, Public Advocate of New York City, New York since 2019; candidate for Lieutenant Governor in 2018

Individuals

- Tiffany Cabán, attorney, political organizer, and 2019 Queens County District Attorney election candidate
- Nikhil Goyal, sociologist
- Cynthia Nixon, actress and activist; candidate for Governor of New York in 2018
- Diane Ravitch, historian of education, educational policy analyst, and research professor at New York University's Steinhardt School of Culture, Education, and Human Development
- Mark Ruffalo, actor
- Zephyr Teachout, attorney, author, and associate professor of law at Fordham University; Democratic nominee for U.S. representative from NY-19 in 2016; candidate for Attorney General in 2018 and Governor in 2014

Organizations

- 350.org
- Badass Teachers Association
- Brand New Congress
- Democracy for America
- Democratic Socialists of America
- IfNotNow
- Justice Democrats
- Make the Road New York
- New York Communities for Change
- New York League of Conservation Voters
- People's Action
- Progressive Change Campaign Committee
- Progressive Democrats of America
- Public Employees Federation
- Sierra Club
- Sunrise Movement
- Youth Climate Strike New York

Parties

- Working Families Party

Newspapers and media

- Daily Kos
- The New York Times
Eliot Engel

Executive officials

- Hillary Clinton, 67th United States Secretary of State (2009–2013), Senator from New York (2001–2009) and 2016 Democratic presidential nominee

U.S. senators

- Kirsten Gillibrand, senator from New York (2009–present)
- Chuck Schumer, senator from New York (1999–present) and Senate Minority Leader (2017–present)

U.S. representatives

- Jim Clyburn, Representative from South Carolina (1993–present) and House Majority Whip (2007–2011) (2019–present)
- Hakeem Jeffries, Representative from New York (2013–present)
- John Lewis, Representative from Georgia (1987–2020)
- Nita Lowey, Representative from New York (1989–2021)
- Gregory Meeks, Representative from New York (1998–present)
- Grace Meng, Representative from New York (2013–present)
- Jerry Nadler, Representative from New York (1992–present)
- Nancy Pelosi, Representative from California (1987–present) and Speaker of the House (2007–2011, 2019–present)
- Adam Schiff, Representative from California (2001–present)
- Maxine Waters, Representative from California (1991–present)

State officials

- Jamaal Bailey, New York State Senator representing New York's 36th District in the New York Senate (2017–present)
- Michael Benedetto, member of the New York State Assembly representing the 82nd District (2005–present)
- ~~Alessandra Biaggi, state senator from District 34 (2019–present)~~ (switched endorsement to Bowman)
- Andrew Cuomo, Governor of New York (2011–present), former attorney general of New York, former Secretary of Housing and Urban Development
- Jeffrey Dinowitz, member of the New York State Assembly representing the 81st District (1994–present)
- Aurelia Greene, former member of the New York State Assembly representing the 77th District (1982–2009)
- Carl Heastie, member of the New York State Assembly from the 83rd district (2001–present) and Speaker of the New York State Assembly (2015–present)
- Latoya Joyner, member of the New York State Assembly representing the 77th District (2015–present)
- Shelley Mayer, New York State Senator representing New York's 37th District in the New York Senate (2019–present)
- Andrea Stewart-Cousins, New York State Senator representing New York's 35th District in the New York Senate (2007–present) and Majority Leader of the New York State Senate (2019–present)

Local officials

- Noam Bramson, Mayor of New Rochelle, New York
- Andrew Cohen, member of the New York City Council
- Rubén Díaz Jr., Borough President of the Bronx
- Timothy C. Idoni, Westchester County Clerk (2006–present) and former mayor of New Rochelle, New York (1991–2006)
- George Latimer, County Executive of Westchester County, New York
- Mike Spano, Mayor of Yonkers, New York (2012–present)

Individuals

- Enes Kanter, professional basketball player for the Boston Celtics
- Randi Weingarten, President of the American Federation of Teachers
- Avi Weiss, rabbi

Unions

- 1199SEIU United Healthcare Workers East
- American Federation of Teachers
- Communications Workers of America
- New York AFL–CIO
- New York State United Teachers
- SEIU 32BJ
- United Federation of Teachers

Organizations

- American Nurses Association
- Armenian National Committee of America
- Brady Campaign
- Congressional Black Caucus
- Democratic Majority for Israel PAC
- End Citizens United
- Humane Society
- Jewish Democratic Council of America
- Moms Demand Action
- NARAL Pro-Choice America
- National Jewish Council for Disabilities
- National Organization for Women
- Planned Parenthood Action Fund
- Population Connection Action Fund
- Sierra Club
- Stonewall Democrats of New York City

Newspapers and media

- The Jewish Press
- New York Daily News
Andom Ghebreghiorgis (withdrew)

Unions

- International Alliance of Theatrical Stage Employees Local One

Organizations

- The People for Bernie Sanders

==== Polling ====
Poll source	Date(s) administered	Sample size	Margin of error	Eliot Engel	Jamaal Bowman	Andom Ghebreghiorgis	Undecided
Data for Progress (Note: Poll sponsored by Bowman's campaign)	June 11–15, 2020	525 (LV)	± 5.1%	36% (Note: Including voters who lean towards a certain candidate)	52%	–	11%
Data for Progress	September 9–13, 2019	578 (RV)	± 5.7%	29%	10%	1%	60%

Hypothetical polling

with Eliot Engel and Generic Democrat Who is More Liberal

Poll source	Date(s) administered	Sample size	Margin of error	Eliot Engel	More Liberal Democrat	Undecided
Data for Progress	September 9–13, 2019	578 (RV)	± 5.7%	35%	20%	46%

==== Primary results ====
2020 Democratic primary results by precinct: Bowman: 30–40%; 40–50%; 50–60%; 60–70%; 70–80%; 80–90%; 90–100%; Engel: 40–50%; 50–60%; 60–70%; 70–80%; 80–90%; 90–100%; Tie: 40–50% Tie; 50% Tie; No votes Interactive map version

Democratic primary results
Party	Candidate	Votes	%
Democratic	Jamaal Bowman	49,367	55.4
Democratic	Eliot Engel (incumbent)	36,149	40.6
Democratic	Christopher Fink	1,625	1.8
Democratic	Sammy Ravelo	1,139	1.3
Democratic	Andom Ghebreghiorgis (withdrawn)	761	0.9
Total votes		89,041	100.0

=== General election ===
==== Predictions ====
Source	Ranking	As of
The Cook Political Report	Safe D	July 2, 2020
Inside Elections	Safe D	June 2, 2020
Sabato's Crystal Ball	Safe D	July 2, 2020
Politico	Safe D	April 19, 2020
Daily Kos	Safe D	June 3, 2020
RCP	Safe D	June 9, 2020
Niskanen	Safe D	June 7, 2020

==== Results ====
New York's 16th congressional district, 2020
Party	Candidate	Votes	%
Democratic	Jamaal Bowman	218,514	84.2
Conservative	Patrick McManus	41,094	15.8
Total votes		259,608	100.0
Democratic hold			

== District 17 ==
2020 New York's 17th congressional district election
- November 3, 2020
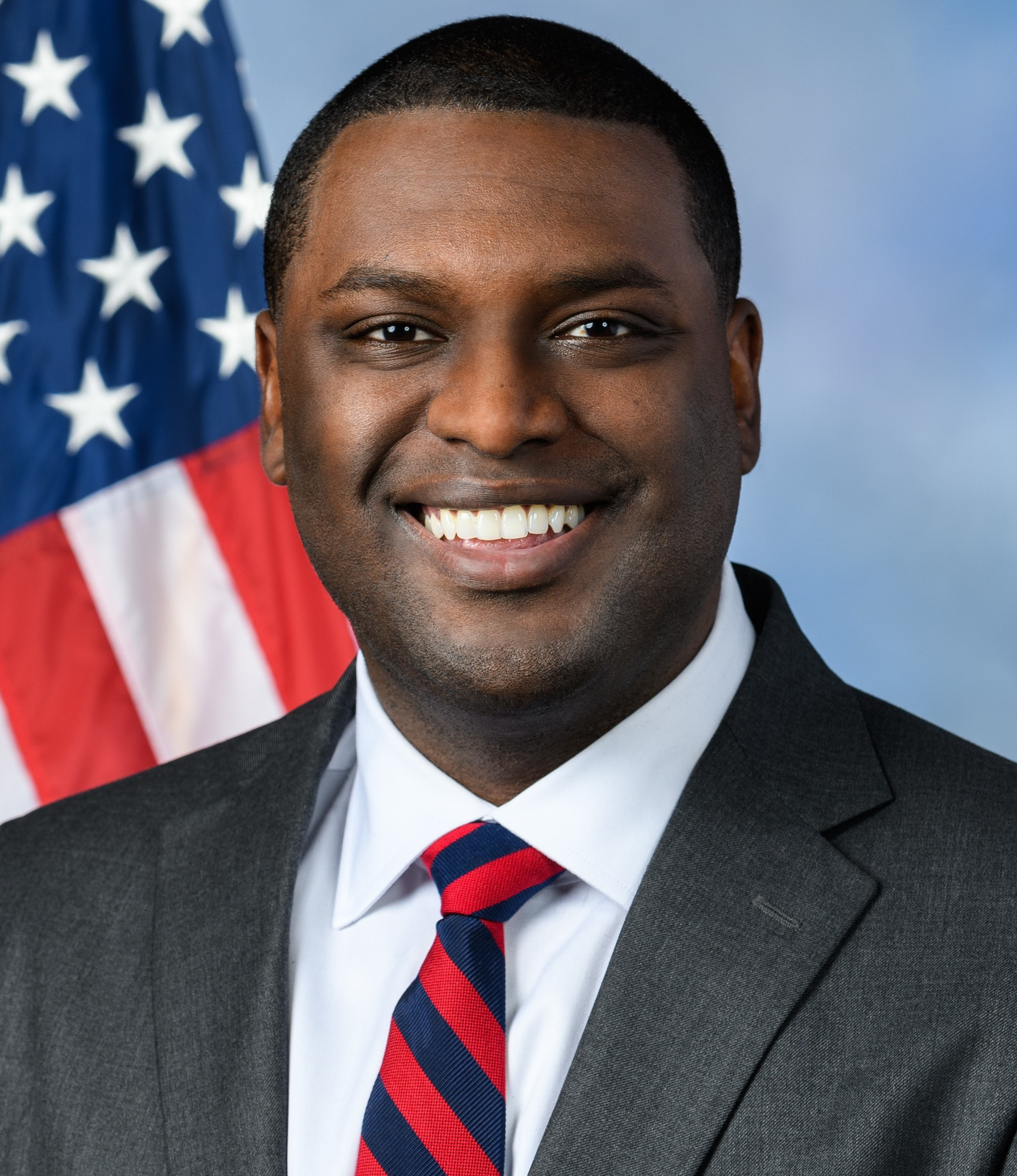

Nominee	Mondaire Jones	Maureen McArdle Schulman
Party	Democratic	Republican
Alliance	Working Families
Popular vote	197,354	117,309
Percentage	59.3%	35.3%
- County results Jones: 50–60% 60–70%
U.S. Representative before election
Nita Lowey
Democratic
Elected U.S. Representative
Mondaire Jones
Democratic

The 17th district encompasses the lower Hudson Valley taking in Rockland County as well as northwestern and central Westchester County. The incumbent was Democrat Nita Lowey, who was re-elected with 88.0% of the vote in 2018, without major-party opposition. On October 10, 2019, Lowey announced she was retiring from Congress and would not seek re-election.

=== Democratic primary ===
==== Candidates ====
===== Declared =====
- David Buchwald, state assemblyman
- David Carlucci, state senator
- Asha Castleberry-Hernandez, U.S. Army veteran and national security expert
- Evelyn Farkas, former Deputy Assistant Secretary of Defense for Russia, Ukraine, and Eurasia
- Allison Fine, former chairwoman of NARAL
- Mondaire Jones, attorney
- Adam Schleifer, former federal prosecutor for Operation Varsity Blues

===== Withdrawn =====
- Catherine Borgia, Westchester County legislator (endorsed Buchwald)
- Duane Jackson, Buchanan trustee and candidate for New York's 18th congressional district in 2012
- David Katz, debt-recovery attorney (endorsed Jones)
- Catherine Parker, Westchester County legislator (endorsed Jones) (remained on ballot)
- Jo-Anna Rodriguez-Wheeler, small business owner

===== Declined =====
- Tom Abinanti, state assemblyman (running for re-election)
- Chelsea Clinton, global health advocate and member of the Clinton family
- Andrew Cuomo, Governor of New York
- Paul Feiner, Greenburgh town supervisor
- George Latimer, Westchester County executive and former state senator (endorsed Buchwald)
- Nita Lowey, incumbent U.S. representative

==== Campaign ====
Incumbent representative Nita Lowey had served as U.S. Representative for the area since 1988, and had not faced a primary challenger or serious Republican opponent in that time. On August 19, 2019, attorney and former Justice Department official Mondaire Jones announced a primary challenge to Lowey, her first since 1988, citing a range of issues on which he felt Lowey was not left-wing enough. On October 10, Lowey announced that she was retiring in a surprise announcement. Following Lowey's retirement, several Democratic candidates announced campaigns for the seat. In the resulting primary, four frontrunners emerged; Jones, Evelyn Farkas, a former Deputy Assistant Secretary of Defense, David Carlucci, a state senator and former member of the Independent Democratic Conference (IDC), and Adam Schleifer, a former federal prosecutor who used his considerable personal wealth to self-finance his campaign.

In the ensuing campaign, Carlucci attacked the other three main candidates, accusing them of being carpetbaggers, while Jones also attacked the other major candidates, accusing them of being more akin to Republicans than Democrats. Carlucci was felt to be a formidable candidate, as he was considered to have a lock on support from voters west of the Hudson River, which bisects the district. However, his past association with the IDC earned him the enmity of both progressive and more moderate Democrats. Six of the eight members of the former IDC had been primaried in 2018, with Carlucci being one of the two survivors. Pro-choice groups devoted money and resources to opposing his bid, as during his period in the state senate he had helped block pro-abortion legislation.

By January 2020, Schleifer was leading the field in fundraising, having raised $1 million largely through self-financing. Schleifer attracted personal criticism for self-financing rather than campaigning through donations, and Farkas also criticised him for refusing to divest from stocks while campaigning. In response, Schleifer called Farkas a "snake", and declared that "all [she] knows is the fog of the beltway". Controversy arose between the two campaigns when Farkas sent a mailer to voters in the district denouncing Schleifer, which featured an image of a man stuffing money into another man's pocket. Schleifer, who is Jewish, accused Farkas of antisemitism in response to the mailer, claiming that it played on negative stereotypes of Jews. Farkas campaign spokesperson Wellesley Daniels rejected the accusations, calling them "disgusting".

Carlucci's campaign began to falter as the primary went on, suffering from poor fundraising and a lack of prominent endorsements, while Jones began to gain traction as endorsements and donations from national progressives boosted his candidacy.

==== Debates ====
2020 New York's 17th congressional district democratic primary debates
No.	Date & time	Host	Moderator	Link	Participants						
Key: P Participant A Absent N Non-invitee W Withdrawn											
Key: P Participant A Absent N Non-invitee W Withdrawn					David Buchwald	David Carlucci	Asha Castleberry-Hernandez	Evelyn Farkas	Allison Fine	Mondaire Jones	Adam Schleifer
1	March 1, 2020	News 12 Networks; Rockland County Democratic Party; Westchester County Democratic Party	Scott McGee; Tara Rosenblum; Sarah Tolin	Video	P	P	P	P	P	P	P
2	June 16, 2020	The Business Council of Westchester	Tara Rosenblum	Video	P	P	P	P	P	P	P

==== Endorsements ====
David Buchwald

State officials

- Sandy Galef, New York State Assemblymember (District 95) since 1993
- Daniel J. O'Donnell, New York State Assemblymember (District 69) since 2003
- Amy Paulin, New York State Assemblymember (District 88) since 2001
- Victor M. Pichardo, New York State Assemblymember (District 86) since 2014
- J. Gary Pretlow, New York State Assemblymember (District 89) since 1993
- Nader Sayegh, New York State Assemblymember (District 90) since 2019
- James Skoufis, New York state senator (District 39) since 2019

Local officials

- George Latimer, Westchester County Executive
- Tom Roach, Mayor of White Plains

Organizations

- Stonewall Democrats Hudson Valley

Labor unions

- Communication Workers of America (District 1, Local 1103, and Local 1107)
- SEIU 32BJ

Newspapers and media

- New York Daily News
David Carlucci

Labor unions

- International Brotherhood of Electrical Workers Local 363
- International Brotherhood of Teamsters Local 445
- International Union of Operating Engineers Local 825
- Laborers' International Union of North America Local 754
Asha Castleberry-Hernandez

Individuals

- Dana J.H. Pittard, retired major general; former Joint Force Land Component Commander-Iraq
Evelyn Farkas

Executive officials

- John Kerry, former United States Secretary of State

U.S. senators

- Bob Graham, former U.S. senator from Florida (1987–2005), former governor of Florida (1979–1987)
- Carl Levin, former U.S. senator from Michigan (1979–2015)

U.S. representatives

- Julia Brownley, U.S. representative (CA-26) since 2013
- Veronica Escobar, U.S. representative (TX-16) since 2019
- Lois Frankel, U.S. representative (FL-21) since 2013
- Marcy Kaptur, U.S. representative (OH-9) since 1983
- Andy Kim, U.S. representative (NJ-3) since 2019
- Annie Kuster, U.S. representative (NH-2) since 2013
- Tom Malinowski, U.S. representative (NJ-7) since 2019
- Seth Moulton, U.S. representative (MA-6) since 2015, former 2020 presidential candidate
- Lucille Roybal-Allard, U.S. representative (CA-40) since 1993
- Donna Shalala, U.S. representative (FL-27) (2019–2021), former U.S. Secretary of Health and Human Services (1993–2001)
- Eric Swalwell, U.S. representative (CA-15) since 2013, former 2020 presidential candidate

State elected officials

- Thomas Duane, former New York state senator (District 29) (1999 to 2012)

Party officials

- Denis McDonough, Chief of Staff to Barack Obama
- John Podesta, Chief of Staff to Hillary Clinton and Advisor to Barack Obama

Individuals

- Jane Alexander, author, actress, and former director of the National Endowment for the Arts
- Stuart Eizenstat, White House Special Advisor for Holocaust Issues (2013–2017)
- Ezekiel Emanuel, Obama Special Advisor for Health Policy, Chair of the Department of Medical Ethics and Health Policy at the University of Pennsylvania
- Daniel B. Shapiro, former U.S., Ambassador to Israel (2011–2017)

Organizations

- Council for a Livable World
- Emily's List
Allison Fine

State elected officials

- Suzi Oppenheimer, former New York state senator (1985–2012)

Local elected officials

- Ruth Messinger, former Manhattan Borough President (1990–1997)

Individuals

- Cheryl Contee, Chair of Netroots Nation

Organizations

- NARAL Pro-Choice America
Mondaire Jones

Executive officials

- Julián Castro, former U.S. Secretary of Housing and Urban Development (2014–2017), former mayor of San Antonio (2009–2014), former 2020 presidential candidate

U.S. senators

- Bernie Sanders, U.S. senator from Vermont since 2007
- Elizabeth Warren, U.S. senator from Massachusetts since 2013

U.S. representatives

- David Cicilline, U.S. representative (RI-1) since 2011
- Deb Haaland, U.S. representative (NM-1) since 2019
- Pramila Jayapal, U.S. representative (WA-7) since 2017
- Ro Khanna, U.S. representative (CA-17) since 2017
- Barbara Lee, U.S. representative from California since 1998
- Alexandria Ocasio-Cortez, U.S. representative (NY-14) since 2019
- Mark Pocan, U.S. representative (WI-2) since 2013
- Ayanna Pressley, U.S. representative (MA-7) since 2019

Organizations

- Black Economic Alliance
- Congressional Progressive Caucus
- Democracy for America
- Empire State Indivisible
- League of Conservation Voters
- LGBTQ Victory Fund
- New York Communities for Change
- Public Employees Federation
- Sunrise Movement

Political parties

- Working Families Party

Newspapers and media

- Daily Kos
- The New York Times
Adam Schleifer

Federal elected officials

- Chris Dodd, former U.S. senator from Connecticut
- Steve Israel, former U.S. representative (NY-2, NY-3) (2001–17)

Local elected officials

- Christine Quinn, former Speaker of the New York City Council

Newspapers and media

- The Jewish Press

=== Polling ===
Poll source	Date(s) administered	Sample size	Margin of error	David Buchwald	David Carlucci	Evelyn Farkas	Mondaire Jones	Adam Schleifer	Other	Undecided
Public Policy Polling	June 15–16, 2020	1,141 (LV)	-	8%	11%	14%	25%	14%	5% (Note: Castleberry-Hernandez with 3%; Fine with 2%)	24%
Data for Progress	May 28 – June 3, 2020	302 (V)	-	6%	15%	13%	12%	13%	3% (Note: Fine with 2%; Castleberry-Hernandez with 1%; Parker with 0%)	38%

==== Primary results ====
Democratic primary results
Party	Candidate	Votes	%
Democratic	Mondaire Jones	32,796	41.9
Democratic	Adam Schleifer	12,732	16.3
Democratic	Evelyn Farkas	12,210	15.6
Democratic	David Carlucci	8,649	11.1
Democratic	David Buchwald	6,673	8.5
Democratic	Asha Castleberry-Hernandez	2,062	2.6
Democratic	Allison Fine	1,588	2.0
Democratic	Catherine Parker (withdrawn)	1,539	2.0
Total votes		78,249	100.0

=== Republican primary ===
==== Declared ====
- Yehudis Gottesfeld, chemical engineer
- Maureen McArdle-Schulman, former FDNY firefighter

==== Withdrawn ====
- Josh Eisen, businessman (ran as an independent)

===== Declined =====
- Rob Astorino, former Westchester County Executive, 2014 nominee for governor of New York
- Ron Belmont, mayor of Harrison
- Ed Day, Rockland County executive
- Leigh McHugh, Rockland County Legislator

==== Campaign ====
Originally, businessman Josh Eisen was considered the Republican frontrunner, as he had posted relatively strong fundraising numbers. However, his campaign imploded when allegations were revealed that he had threatened former employees, and that while embroiled in a legal dispute he had told his opponents' wife that she would "bathe in the warm semen of Mengele" and had also written sexual polemics about this same opponents' daughter. This revelation caused the local Rockland and Westchester Republican parties to disavow Eisen's campaign, and he withdrew from the race. Eisen's withdrawal paved the way for two other candidates, retired firefighter Maureen McArdle-Schulman and chemical engineer Yehudis Gottesfeld, to compete for the nomination.

==== Endorsements ====
Yehudis Gottesfeld

Organizations

- Rockland County Republican Party
Maureen McArdle-Schulman

Organizations

- Westchester County Republican Party

==== Primary results ====
Republican primary results
Party	Candidate	Votes	%
Republican	Maureen McArdle-Schulman	8,492	78.4
Republican	Yehudis Gottesfeld	2,338	21.6
Total votes		10,830	100.0

=== General election ===
==== Predictions ====
Source	Ranking	As of
The Cook Political Report	Safe D	July 2, 2020
Inside Elections	Safe D	June 2, 2020
Sabato's Crystal Ball	Safe D	July 2, 2020
Politico	Safe D	April 19, 2020
Daily Kos	Safe D	June 3, 2020
RCP	Safe D	June 9, 2020
Niskanen	Safe D	June 7, 2020

==== Results ====
New York's 17th congressional district, 2020
Party	Candidate	Votes	%
Democratic	Mondaire Jones	183,976	55.3
Working Families	Mondaire Jones	13,378	4.0
Total	Mondaire Jones	197,354	59.3
Republican	Maureen McArdle Schulman	117,309	35.3
Conservative	Yehudis Gottesfeld	8,887	2.7
Independent	Joshua Eisen	6,363	1.9
SAM	Michael Parietti	2,745	0.8
Total votes		332,658	100.0
Democratic hold			

== District 18 ==
2020 New York's 18th congressional district election
- November 3, 2020
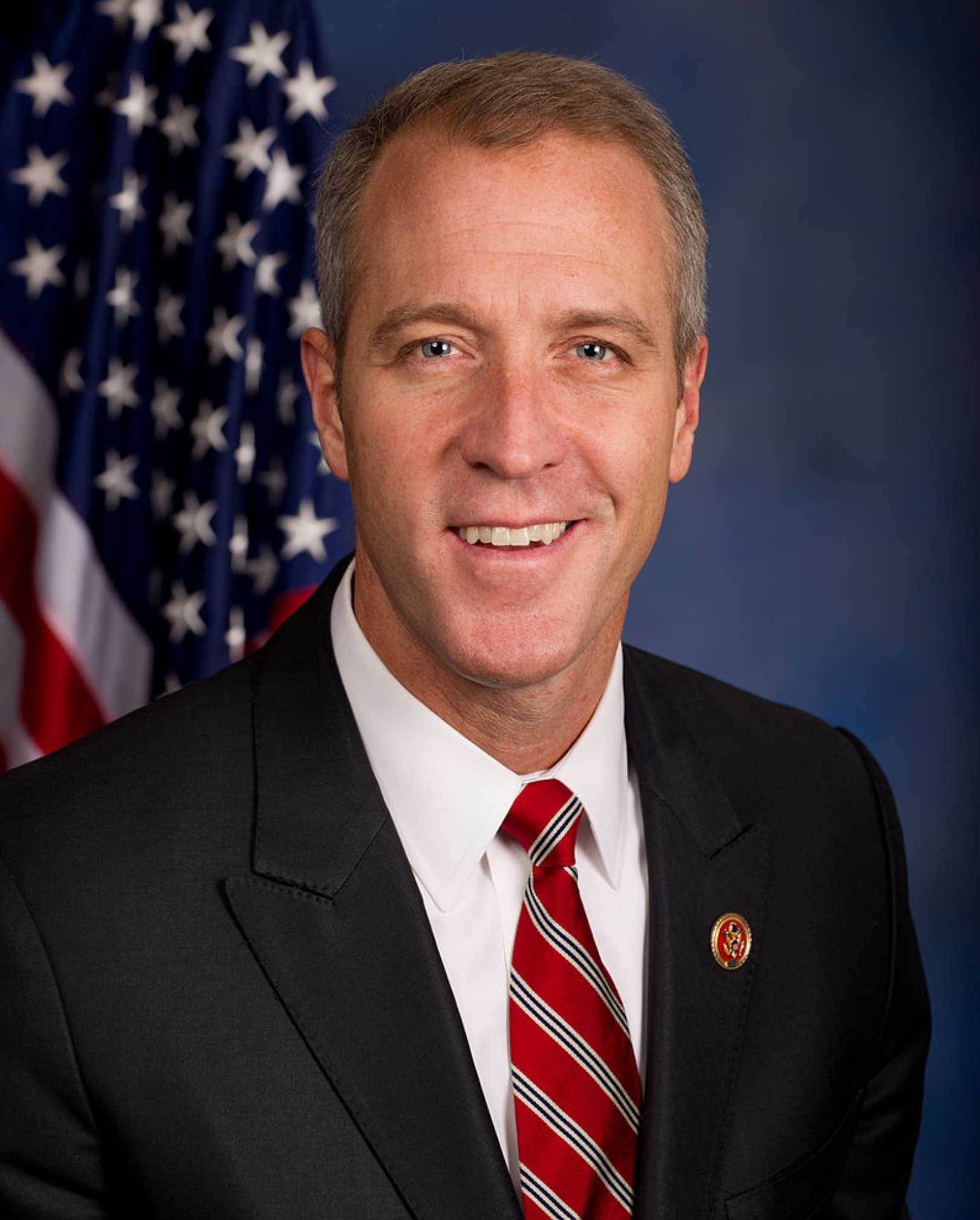

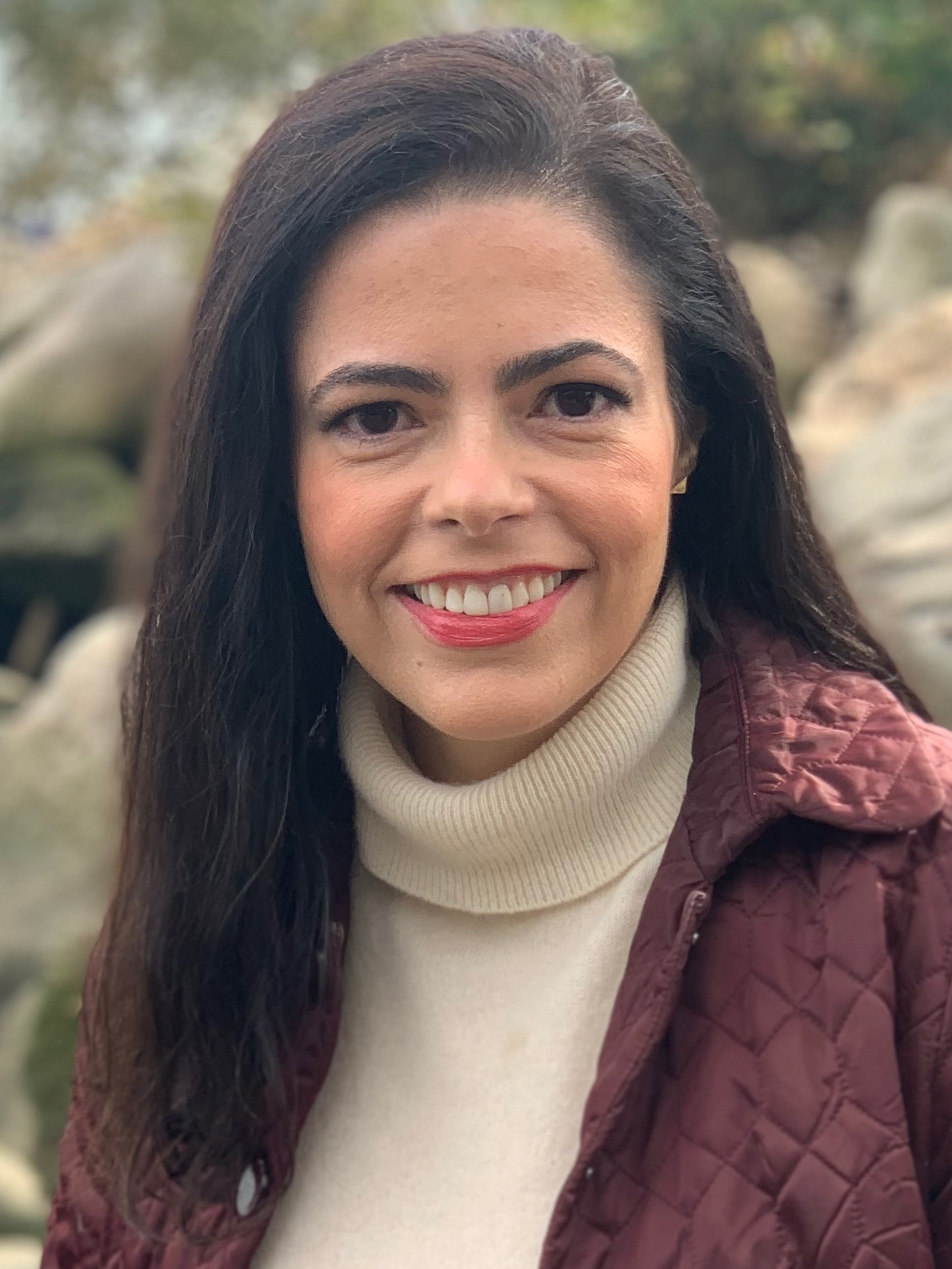
Nominee	Sean Patrick Maloney	Chele Farley
Party	Democratic	Republican
Alliance	Working Families; Independence	Conservative
Popular vote	187,444	145,145
Percentage	55.8%	43.2%
- County results Maloney: 50–60% 60–70% Farley: 50–60%
U.S. Representative before election
Sean Patrick Maloney
Democratic
Elected U.S. Representative
Sean Patrick Maloney
Democratic

The 18th district is located in the mid-Hudson Valley covering all of Orange County and Putnam County, as well as parts of southern Dutchess County and northeastern Westchester County, including the city of Poughkeepsie. The incumbent was Democrat Sean Patrick Maloney, who was re-elected with 55.5% of the vote in 2018.

=== Democratic primary ===
==== Candidates ====
===== Declared =====
- Sean Patrick Maloney, incumbent U.S. representative

==== Endorsements ====
Sean Patrick Maloney

Organizations

- Human Rights Campaign
- NARAL Pro-Choice America
- New York League of Conservation Voters
- Planned Parenthood Action Fund
- Public Employees Federation
- Sierra Club
- Working Families Party

=== Republican primary ===
==== Candidates ====
===== Declared =====
- Chele Farley, investment banker and nominee for U.S. Senate in 2018

==== Endorsements ====
Chele Farley

Federal officials

- Elise Stefanik, U.S. representative from NY-21

Organizations

- Maggie's List

=== Third parties ===
==== Candidates ====
===== Declared =====
- Scott Smith, former Middletown town councilman and candidate for New York's 18th congressional district in 2014

=== General election ===
==== Predictions ====
Source	Ranking	As of
The Cook Political Report	Safe D	November 2, 2020
Inside Elections	Safe D	June 2, 2020
Sabato's Crystal Ball	Likely D	July 2, 2020
Politico	Lean D	April 19, 2020
Daily Kos	Safe D	June 3, 2020
RCP	Likely D	June 9, 2020
Niskanen	Safe D	June 7, 2020

==== Polling ====
Poll source	Date(s) administered	Sample size	Margin of error	Sean Patrick Maloney (D)	Chele Farley (R)	Scott Smith (L)	Undecided
Global Strategy Group (D)	October 6–11, 2020	400 (LV)	± 4.9%	53%	35%	5%	–

Hypothetical polling

Poll source	Date(s) administered	Sample size	Margin of error	Generic Democrat	Generic Republican
Global Strategy Group (D)	October 6–11, 2020	400 (LV)	± 4.9%	48%	43%

==== Results ====
New York's 18th congressional district, 2020
Party	Candidate	Votes	%
Democratic	Sean Patrick Maloney	171,161	51.0
Working Families	Sean Patrick Maloney	12,924	3.8
Independence	Sean Patrick Maloney	3,359	1.0
Total	Sean Patrick Maloney (incumbent)	187,444	55.8
Republican	Chele Farley	128,611	38.3
Conservative	Chele Farley	16,534	4.9
Total	Chele Farley	145,145	43.2
Libertarian	Scott Smith	2,687	0.8
SAM	Scott Smith	477	0.2
Total	Scott Smith	3,164	1.0
Total votes		335,753	100.0
Democratic hold			

== District 19 ==
2020 New York's 19th congressional district election
- November 3, 2020
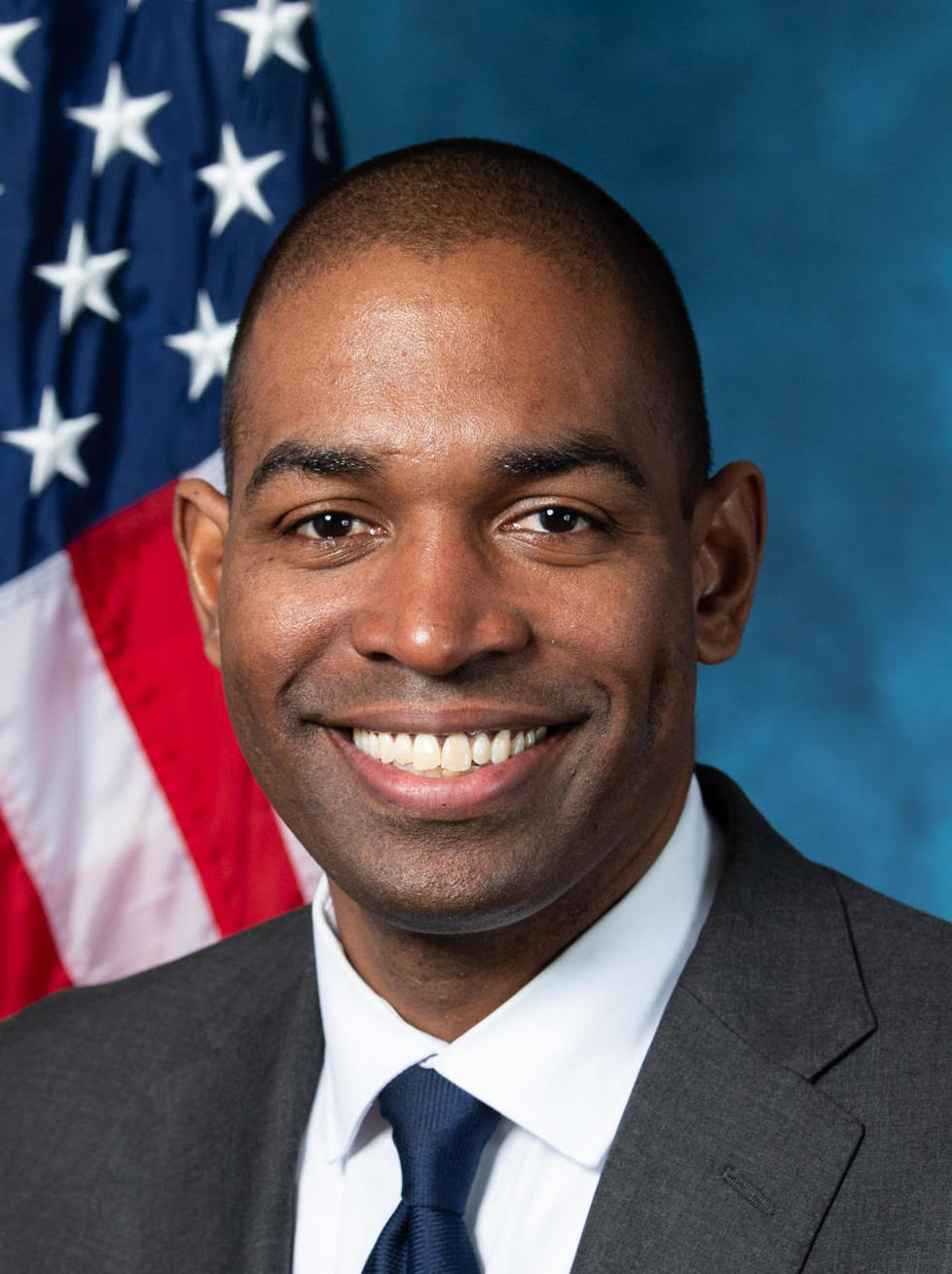

Nominee	Antonio Delgado	Kyle Van De Water
Party	Democratic	Republican
Alliance	Working Families; SAM
Popular vote	192,100	151,475
Percentage	54.8%	43.2%
- County results Delgado: 40–50% 50–60% 60–70% Van De Water: 50–60%
U.S. Representative before election
Antonio Delgado
Democratic
Elected U.S. Representative
Antonio Delgado
Democratic

The 19th district is based in the upper Hudson Valley and Catskills. The incumbent was Democrat Antonio Delgado, who flipped the district and was elected with 51.4% of the vote in 2018.

=== Democratic primary ===
==== Candidates ====
===== Declared =====
- Antonio Delgado, incumbent U.S. representative

==== Endorsements ====
Antonio Delgado (D)

U.S. presidents

- Barack Obama, 44th president of the United States

Organizations

- Black Economic Alliance
- League of Conservation Voters Action Fund
- Public Employees Federation
- Sierra Club

=== Republican primary ===
==== Candidates ====
===== Declared =====
- Ola Hawatmeh, fashion designer and philanthropist
- Kyle Van De Water, former Millbrook village trustee and attorney

===== Withdrew =====
- Tony German, former New York National Guard adjutant general
- Mike Roth, activist

===== Declined =====
- John Faso, former U.S. representative
- Steven McLaughlin, Rensselaer County executive and former state assemblyman
- Marc Molinaro, Dutchess County executive, nominee for Governor of New York in 2018, and former state assemblyman
- Sue Serino, state senator

==== Primary results ====
Republican primary results
Party	Candidate	Votes	%
Republican	Kyle Van De Water	12,138	57.5
Republican	Ola Hawatmeh	8,988	42.5
Total votes		21,126	100.0

=== General election ===
==== Predictions ====
Source	Ranking	As of
The Cook Political Report	Likely D	September 29, 2020
Inside Elections	Safe D	June 2, 2020
Sabato's Crystal Ball	Likely D	July 2, 2020
Politico	Lean D	April 19, 2020
Daily Kos	Safe D	October 26, 2020
RCP	Likely D	June 9, 2020
Niskanen	Lean D	June 7, 2020

==== Results ====
New York's 19th congressional district, 2020
Party	Candidate	Votes	%
Democratic	Antonio Delgado	168,281	48.0
Working Families	Antonio Delgado	22,969	6.6
SAM	Antonio Delgado	850	0.2
Total	Antonio Delgado (incumbent)	192,100	54.8
Republican	Kyle Van De Water	151,475	43.2
Libertarian	Victoria Alexander	4,224	1.2
Green	Steve Greenfield	2,799	0.8
Total votes		350,598	100.0
Democratic hold			

== District 20 ==
2020 New York's 20th congressional district election
- November 3, 2020
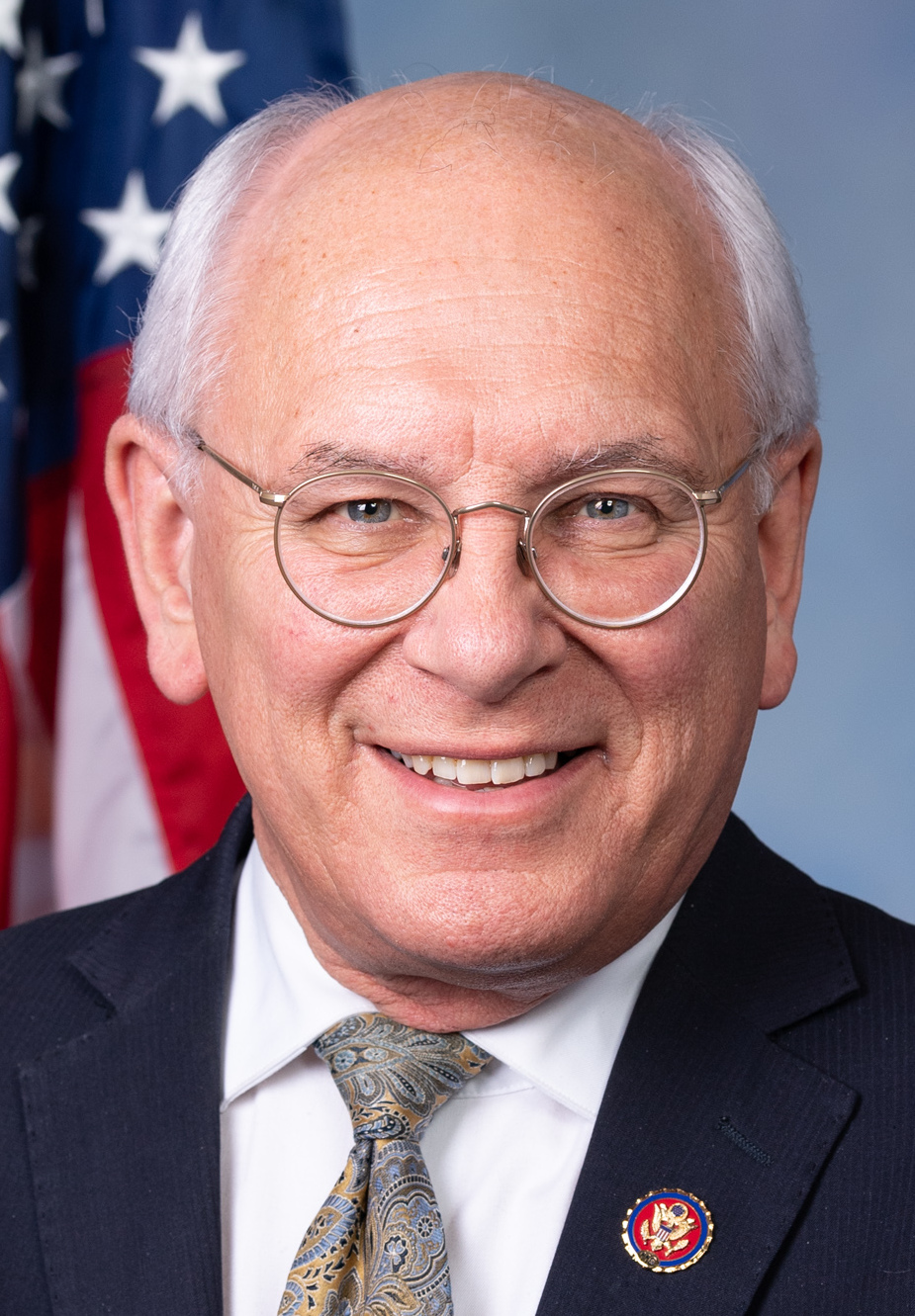

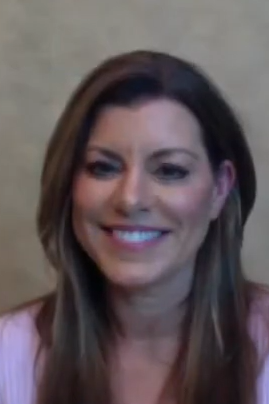
Nominee	Paul Tonko	Liz Joy
Party	Democratic	Republican
Alliance	Working Families; Independence	Conservative; SAM
Popular vote	219,705	139,446
Percentage	61.2%	38.8%
- County results Tonko: 50–60% 60–70% Joy: 50–60%
U.S. Representative before election
Paul Tonko
Democratic
Elected U.S. Representative
Paul Tonko
Democratic

The 20th district is located in the Capital District and includes all of Albany and Schenectady Counties, and portions of Montgomery, Rensselaer and Saratoga Counties. The incumbent was Democrat Paul Tonko, who was re-elected with 66.5% of the vote in 2018.

=== Democratic primary ===
==== Candidates ====
===== Declared =====
- Paul Tonko, incumbent U.S. representative

==== Endorsements ====
Paul Tonko

Organizations

- New York League of Conservation Voters

Labor unions

- Public Employees Federation

=== Republican primary ===
==== Candidates ====
===== Declared =====
- Liz Joy, real estate agent and author

=== General election ===
==== Predictions ====
Source	Ranking	As of
The Cook Political Report	Safe D	July 2, 2020
Inside Elections	Safe D	June 2, 2020
Sabato's Crystal Ball	Safe D	July 2, 2020
Politico	Safe D	April 19, 2020
Daily Kos	Safe D	June 3, 2020
RCP	Safe D	June 9, 2020
Niskanen	Safe D	June 7, 2020

==== Results ====
New York's 20th congressional district, 2020
Party	Candidate	Votes	%
Democratic	Paul Tonko	194,071	54.0
Working Families	Paul Tonko	19,678	5.5
Independence	Paul Tonko	5,956	1.7
Total	Paul Tonko (incumbent)	219,705	61.2
Republican	Liz Joy	120,839	33.6
Conservative	Liz Joy	17,849	5.0
SAM	Liz Joy	758	0.2
Total	Liz Joy	139,446	38.8
Total votes		359,151	100.0
Democratic hold			

== District 21 ==
2020 New York's 21st congressional district election
- November 3, 2020
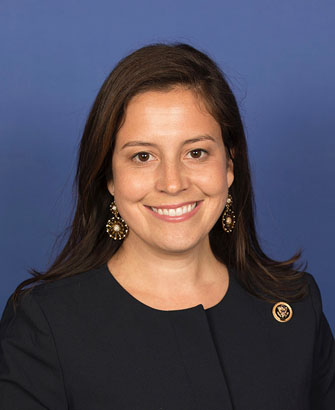

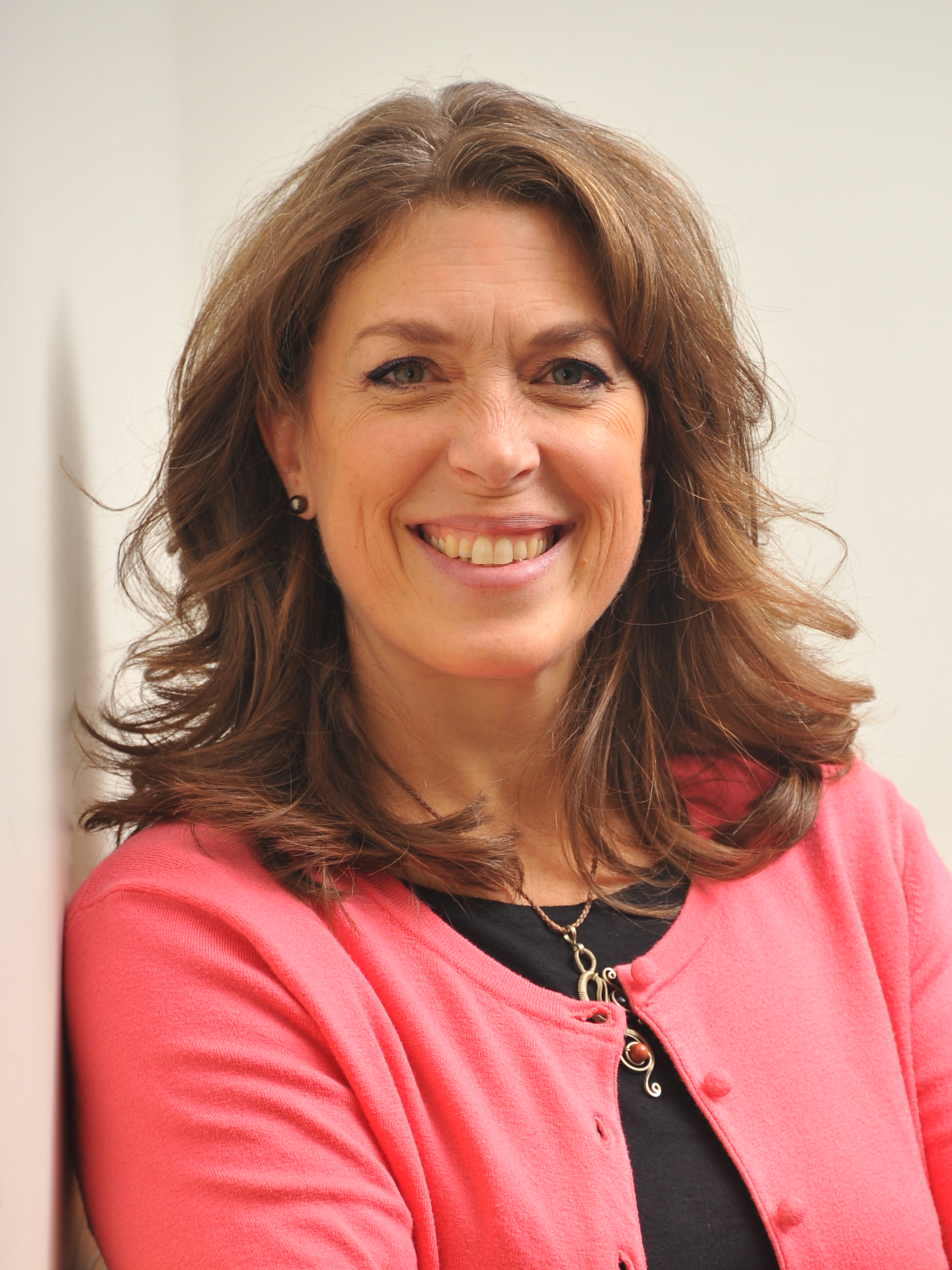
Nominee	Elise Stefanik	Tedra Cobb
Party	Republican	Democratic
Alliance	Conservative; Independence	Working Families
Popular vote	188,655	131,995
Percentage	58.8%	41.2%
- County results Stefanik: 50–60% 60–70% 70–80%
U.S. Representative before election
Elise Stefanik
Republican
Elected U.S. Representative
Elise Stefanik
Republican

The 21st district is based in upstate New York, encompassing the Adirondack Mountains and North Country regions. The incumbent was Republican Elise Stefanik, who was re-elected with 56.1% of the vote in 2018.

=== Republican primary ===
==== Candidates ====
===== Declared =====
- Elise Stefanik, incumbent U.S. representative

===== Endorsements =====
Elise Stefanik

Organizations

- Maggie's List

=== Democratic primary ===
==== Candidates ====
===== Declared =====
- Tedra Cobb, former St. Lawrence County legislator and nominee for New York's 21st congressional district in 2018

===== Declined =====
- Simon Conroy, Clinton County legislator

===== Endorsements =====
Tedra Cobb

Organizations

- Public Employees Federation
- Sierra Club

=== General election ===
==== Predictions ====
Source	Ranking	As of
The Cook Political Report	Safe R	July 2, 2020
Inside Elections	Safe R	June 2, 2020
Sabato's Crystal Ball	Safe R	July 2, 2020
Politico	Likely R	April 19, 2020
Daily Kos	Safe R	June 3, 2020
RCP	Safe R	June 9, 2020
Niskanen	Tossup	June 7, 2020

==== Results ====
New York's 21st congressional district, 2020
Party	Candidate	Votes	%
Republican	Elise Stefanik	169,684	52.9
Conservative	Elise Stefanik	15,044	4.7
Independence	Elise Stefanik	3,927	1.2
Total	Elise Stefanik (incumbent)	188,655	58.8
Democratic	Tedra Cobb	122,422	38.2
Working Families	Tedra Cobb	9,573	3.0
Total	Tedra Cobb	131,995	41.2
Total votes		320,788	100.0
Republican hold			

== District 22 ==
2020 New York's 22nd congressional district election
- November 3, 2020
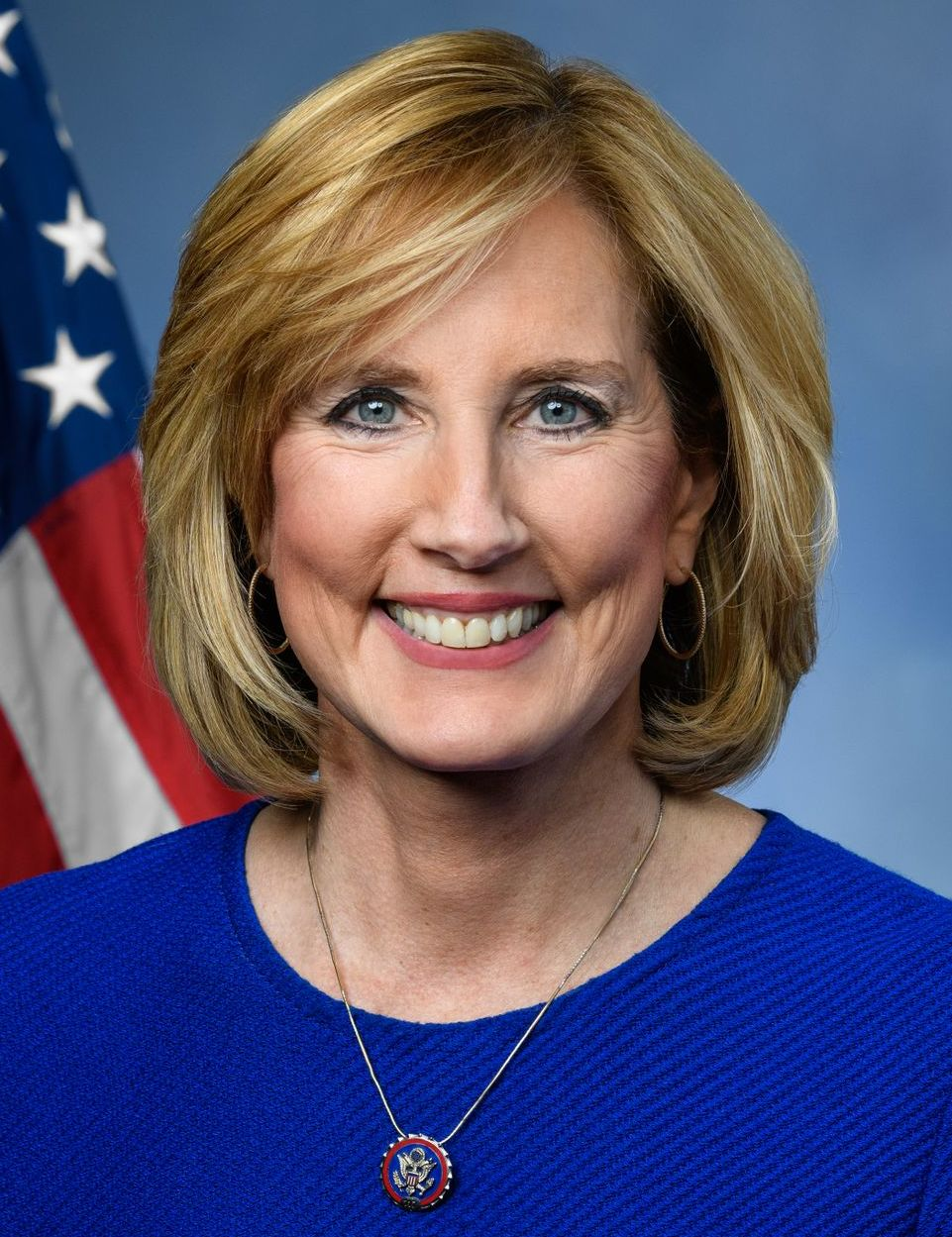

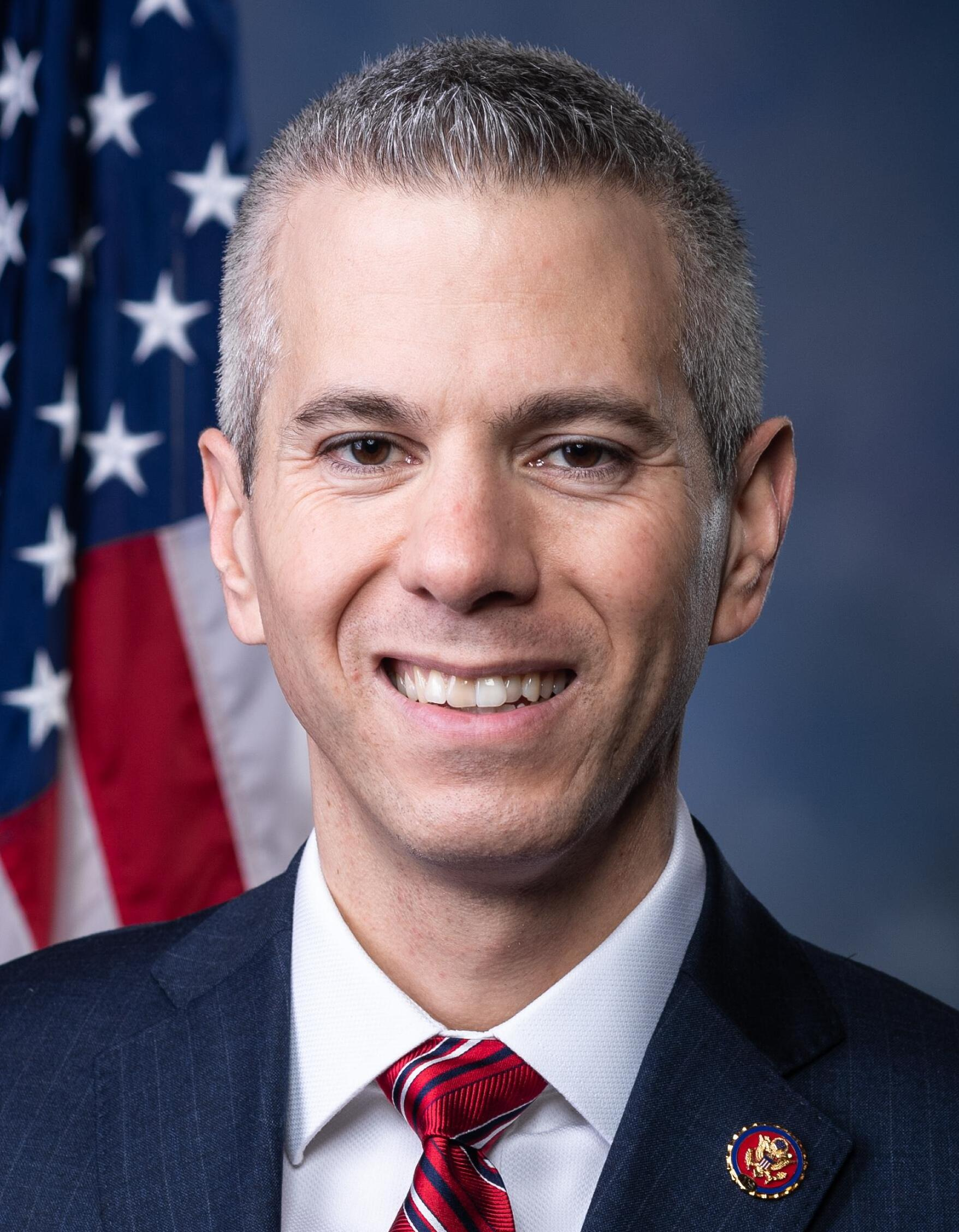
Nominee	Claudia Tenney	Anthony Brindisi
Party	Republican	Democratic
Alliance	Conservative	Working Families; Independence
Popular vote	156,098	155,989
Percentage	47.80%	47.77%
- County results Tenney: 50–60% 60–70% Brindisi: 50–60%
U.S. Representative before election
Anthony Brindisi
Democratic
Elected U.S. Representative
Claudia Tenney
Republican

The 22nd district is based in central New York and the Mohawk Valley, including the cities of Utica, Rome, Cortland and Binghamton. The incumbent was Democrat Anthony Brindisi, who flipped the district and was elected with 50.9% of the vote in 2018. This was a rematch of the 2018 election where Brindisi unseated Tenney.

The election went into lengthy legal proceedings during the counting of absentee ballots. Several errors by county boards of election were uncovered during the proceedings, affecting thousands of voters. The Oneida County Board of Elections used sticky notes to mark disputed ballots, which fell off and adhered to other ballots: this came to be called "stickygate". More significantly, Oneida County failed to process registrations for 2,400 voters, and incorrectly rejected 700 absentee ballots. Oneida County would later face legal action from the federal Department of Justice over these errors. Other county boards of elections also made errors affecting dozens of ballots.

The seat officially became vacant when Brindisi's term expired on January 3, 2021. On February 5, 2021, Judge Scott DelConte ruled that Tenney had won the election by 109 votes. Brindisi conceded the election on February 8.

=== Democratic primary ===
==== Candidates ====
===== Declared =====
- Anthony Brindisi, incumbent U.S. representative

=== Republican primary ===
==== Candidates ====
===== Declared =====
- George Phillips, teacher, former Broome County legislator, and nominee for New York's 22nd congressional district in 2008 and 2010
- Claudia Tenney, former U.S. representative

==== Withdrawn ====
- Steve Cornwell, Broome County district attorney
- Franklin Sager, teacher

===== Declined =====
- Richard C. David, mayor of Binghamton

==== Primary results ====
Republican primary results
Party	Candidate	Votes	%
Republican	Claudia Tenney	23,784	59.6
Republican	George Phillips	16,151	40.4
Total votes		39,935	100.0

=== General election ===
==== Predictions ====
Source	Ranking	As of
The Cook Political Report	Tossup	July 2, 2020
Inside Elections	Tilt D	June 2, 2020
Sabato's Crystal Ball	Lean D	November 2, 2020
Politico	Tossup	April 19, 2020
Daily Kos	Tossup	June 3, 2020
RCP	Tossup	June 9, 2020
Niskanen	Lean D	June 7, 2020

==== Endorsements ====
Anthony Brindisi (D)

Organizations

- Blue Dog Coalition
- End Citizens United
- League of Conservation Voters Action Fund
- NARAL Pro-Choice America
- New Democrat Coalition
- Planned Parenthood Action Fund
- Public Employees Federation
- Sierra Club
Claudia Tenney (R)

Federal politicians

- Kevin McCarthy, House Minority Leader, U.S. representative (CA-23)
- Elise Stefanik, U.S. representative (NY-21)
- Donald Trump, 45th president of the United States

State officials

- George Pataki, former governor of New York (1995–2006)

Organizations

- New York Young Republican Club
- Susan B. Anthony List

==== Polling ====
Poll source	Date(s) administered	Sample size	Margin of error	Anthony Brindisi (D)	Claudia Tenney (R)	Other/ Undecided
Siena College	September 27 – October 4, 2020	383 (LV)	± 5%	48%	39%	13% (Note: Price (L) with 4%; Undecided with 9%)

==== Results ====
New York's 22nd congressional district, 2020
Party	Candidate	Votes	%
Republican	Claudia Tenney	143,291	43.88
Conservative	Claudia Tenney	12,807	3.92
Total	Claudia Tenney	156,098	47.80
Democratic	Anthony Brindisi	138,898	42.53
Working Families	Anthony Brindisi	11,188	3.43
Independence	Anthony Brindisi	5,903	1.81
Total	Anthony Brindisi (incumbent)	155,989	47.77
Libertarian	Keith Price	6,780	2.08
Total votes		326,566	100.0
Republican gain from Democratic			

== District 23 ==
2020 New York's 23rd congressional district election
- November 3, 2020
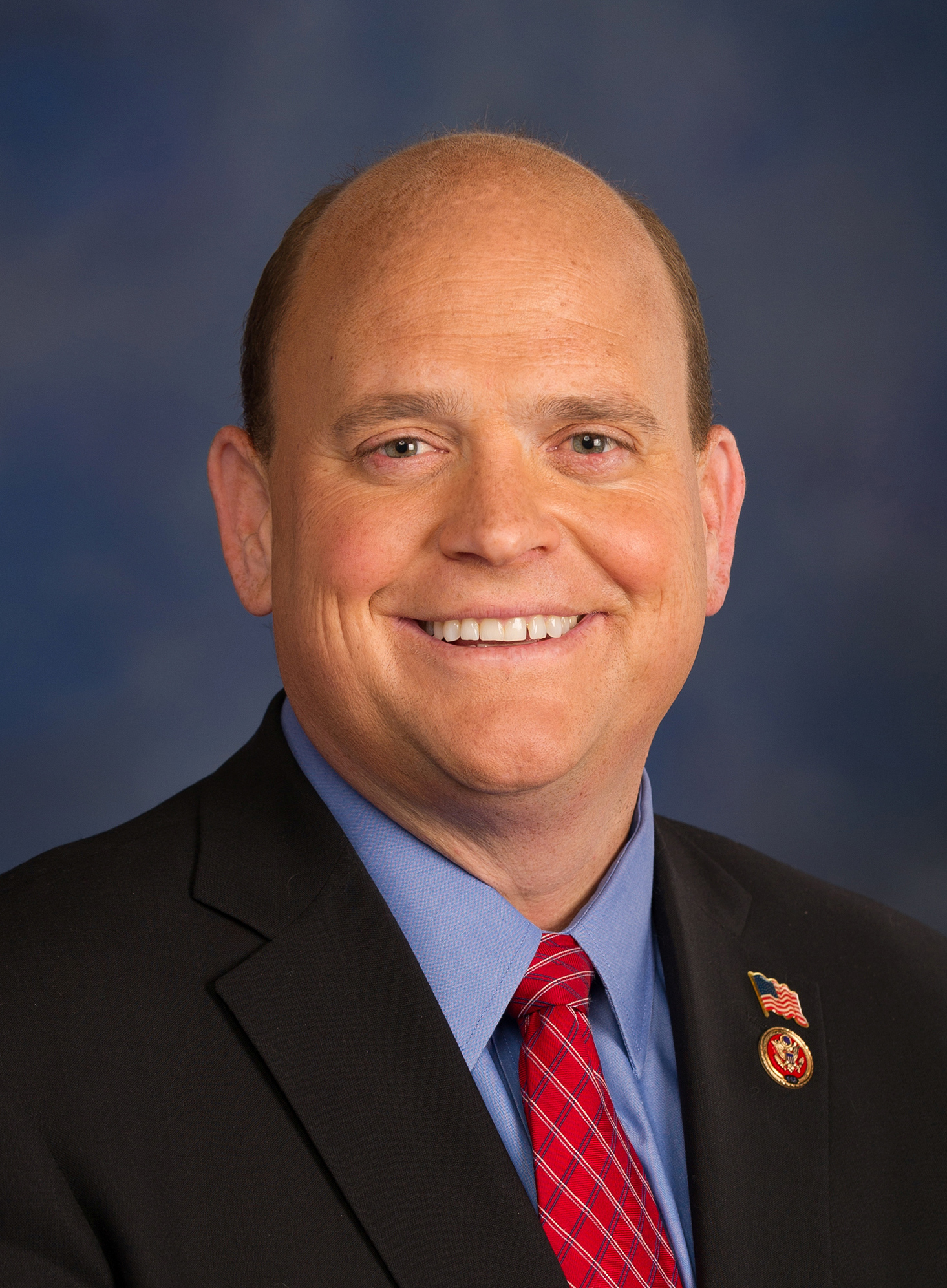

Nominee	Tom Reed	Tracy Mitrano
Party	Republican	Democratic
Alliance	Conservative; Independence	Working Families
Popular vote	181,021	128,976
Percentage	57.7%	41.1%
- County results Reed: 50–60% 60–70% 70–80% Mitrano: 70–80%
U.S. Representative before election
Tom Reed
Republican
Elected U.S. Representative
Tom Reed
Republican

The 23rd district is based in the Southern Tier, adjacent to Lake Erie and the state's border with Pennsylvania, and is home to the cities of Jamestown, Olean, Elmira, and Ithaca. The incumbent was Republican Tom Reed, who was re-elected with 54.2% of the vote in 2018.

=== Republican primary ===
==== Candidates ====
===== Declared =====
- Tom Reed, incumbent U.S. representative

===== Withdrawn =====
- Casey McDonald, real estate developer and activist

=== Democratic primary ===
==== Candidates ====
===== Declared =====
- Tracy Mitrano, cyber security expert and nominee for New York's 23rd congressional district in 2018

===== Withdrawn =====
- Scott Noren, physician and U.S. Army veteran

===== Declined =====
- Paolo Cremidis, New York State Young Democrats Rural Caucus Chair

===== Endorsements =====
Tracy Mitrano

Organizations

- LGBTQ Victory Fund
- Public Employees Federation
- Sierra Club

=== General election ===
==== Predictions ====
Source	Ranking	As of
The Cook Political Report	Safe R	July 2, 2020
Inside Elections	Safe R	June 2, 2020
Sabato's Crystal Ball	Safe R	July 2, 2020
Politico	Likely R	October 11, 2020
Daily Kos	Safe R	June 3, 2020
RCP	Safe R	June 9, 2020
Niskanen	Safe R	June 7, 2020

==== Polling ====
Poll source	Date(s) administered	Sample size	Margin of error	Tom Reed (R)	Tracy Mitrano (D)	Other/ Undecided
Public Policy Polling (D) (Note: Poll conducted for Mitrano's campaign.)	September 28–29, 2020	1,228 (V)	± 2.8%	47%	40%	–
Global Strategy Group (D)	July 23–26, 2020	502 (LV)	± 4.4%	50%	38%	–

Hypothetical polling

with Generic Republican and Generic Democrat

Poll source	Date(s) administered	Sample size	Margin of error	Generic Republican	Generic Democrat
Global Strategy Group (D)	July 23–26, 2020	502 (LV)	± 4.4%	45%	41%

==== Results ====
New York's 23rd congressional district, 2020
Party	Candidate	Votes	%
Republican	Tom Reed	161,800	51.6
Conservative	Tom Reed	15,512	4.9
Independence	Tom Reed	3,709	1.2
Total	Tom Reed (incumbent)	181,021	57.7
Democratic	Tracy Mitrano	116,025	37.0
Working Families	Tracy Mitrano	12,951	4.1
Total	Tracy Mitrano	128,976	41.1
Libertarian	Andrew Kolstee	3,650	1.2
Total votes		313,724	100.0
Republican hold			

== District 24 ==
2020 New York's 24th congressional district election
- November 3, 2020
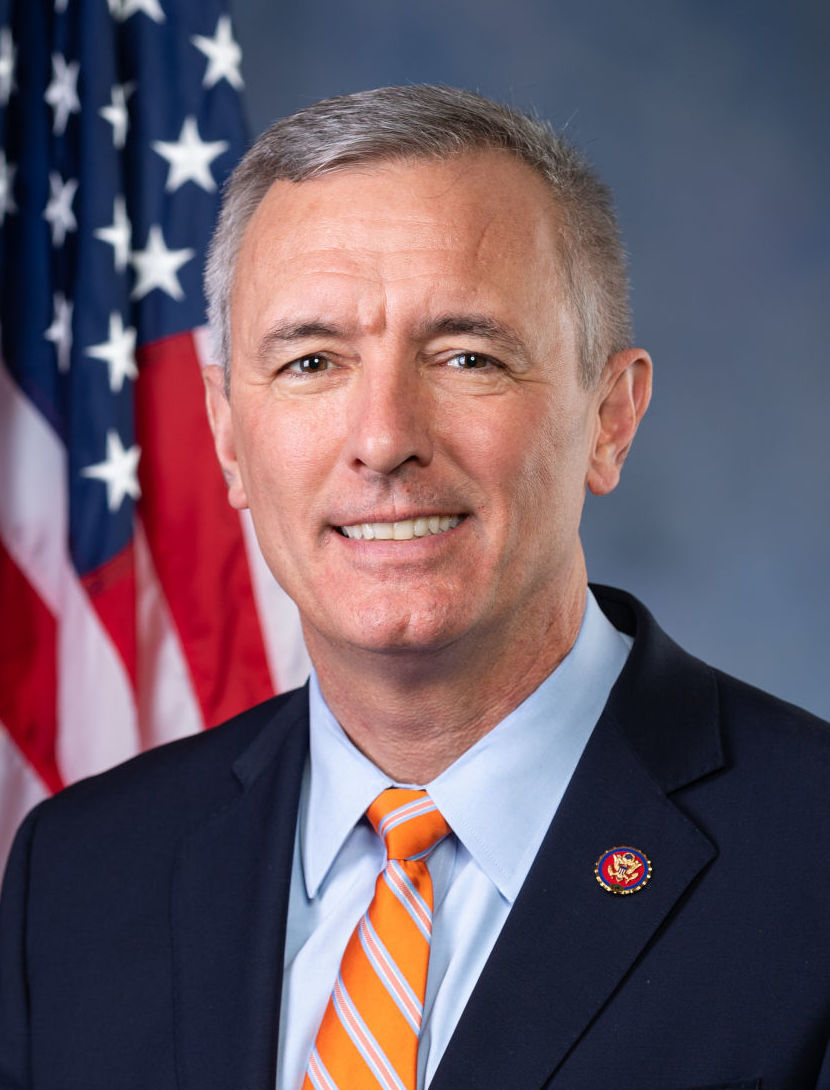

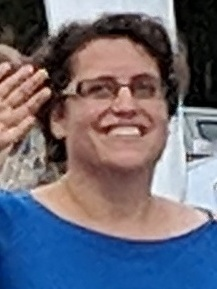
Nominee	John Katko	Dana Balter
Party	Republican	Democratic
Alliance	Conservative; Independence
Popular vote	182,809	147,877
Percentage	53.1%	43.0%
- County results Katko: 40–50% 60–70%
U.S. Representative before election
John Katko
Republican
Elected U.S. Representative
John Katko
Republican

The 24th district is centered around the Syracuse area and contains Cayuga, Onondaga, and Wayne counties, as well as western Oswego County. The incumbent was Republican John Katko, who was re-elected with 52.6% of the vote in 2018.

=== Republican primary ===
==== Candidates ====
===== Declared =====
- John Katko, incumbent U.S. representative

=== Democratic primary ===
==== Candidates ====
===== Declared =====
- Dana Balter, nonprofit leader, Syracuse University professor, and nominee for New York's 24th congressional district in 2018
- Francis Conole, former intelligence officer and U.S. Navy veteran

===== Withdrew =====
- Roger Misso, U.S. Navy veteran

==== Endorsements ====
Dana Balter

U.S. presidents

- Barack Obama, 44th president of the United States

Organizations

- Congressional Progressive Caucus
- Democracy for America
- Emily's List
- Planned Parenthood Action Fund
- Progressive Change Campaign Committee
- Public Employees Federation
- Sierra Club

==== Polling ====
Poll source	Date(s) administered	Sample size	Margin of error	Dana Balter	Francis Conole	Undecided
GBAO Strategies (Note: Poll sponsored by Dana Balter's campaign)	June 4–7, 2020	400 (LV)	± 4.9%	60%	31%	9%
GBAO Strategies	March 23–25, 2020	400 (LV)	± 4.9%	64%	21%	15%

==== Primary results ====
Democratic primary results
Party	Candidate	Votes	%
Democratic	Dana Balter	29,531	63.1
Democratic	Francis Conole	17,254	36.9
Total votes		46,785	100.0

=== General election ===
==== Debate ====
2020 New York's 24th congressional district debate
No.	Date	Host	Moderator	Link	Republican	Democratic
Key: P Participant A Absent N Not invited I Invited W Withdrawn						
Key: P Participant A Absent N Not invited I Invited W Withdrawn					John Katko	Dana Balter
1	Oct. 25, 2020	WSYR-TV	Dan Cummings	YouTube	P	P

==== Predictions ====
Source	Ranking	As of
The Cook Political Report	Tossup	October 8, 2020
Inside Elections	Tilt R	August 7, 2020
Sabato's Crystal Ball	Lean R	November 2, 2020
Politico	Tossup	October 11, 2020
Daily Kos	Lean R	June 3, 2020
RCP	Lean R	June 9, 2020
Niskanen	Likely R	June 7, 2020

==== Polling ====
Poll source	Date(s) administered	Sample size	Margin of error	John Katko (R)	Dana Balter (D)	Steve Williams (WFP)	Other	Undecided
Change Research	October 29 – November 2, 2020	739 (LV)	± 3.9%	44%	46%	4%	2% (Note: "Don't recall" with 2%; Did not vote and would not vote with 0%)	3%
Siena College	October 20–22, 2020	558 (LV)	± 4.1%	45%	45%	5%	2% (Note: "Someone else" and would not vote with 1%)	4%
Public Opinion Strategies (R) (Note: Poll sponsored by Katko's campaign)	October 15–18, 2020	400 (LV)	± 4.9%	47%	39%	3%	–	11%
Public Policy Polling (D) (Note: Poll sponsored by the House Majority PAC, an organization which works to elect Democratic candidates)	October 13–14, 2020	798 (RV)	± 3.5%	43%	45%	–	–	–
Siena College	September 28–29, 2020	414 (LV)	± 5.1%	40% (Note: Standard VI response)	42%	6%	2% (Note: Would not vote with 2%; "Someone else" with 0%)	10%
Siena College	September 28–29, 2020	414 (LV)	± 5.1%	42% (Note: If Williams is removed from the ballot)	45%	–	3% (Note: Would not vote with 3%; "Someone else" with 0%)	10%
GBAO Strategies (D)	August 23–25, 2020	500 (LV)	± 4.4%	46%	48%	–	–	–
Public Opinion Strategies (R)	August 12–15, 2020	400 (LV)	± 4.9%	51%	40%	–	–	–
RMG Research	July 29 – August 4, 2020	500 (LV)	± 4.3%	40%	37%	–	–	23%
DCCC Targeting and Analytics Department (D)	June 18–22, 2020	400 (LV)	± 4.9%	45%	48%	–	–	–
Normington, Petts & Associates (D)	June 8–10, 2020	400 (RV)	± 4.9%	47%	47%	–	–	–

==== Results ====
New York's 24th congressional district, 2020
Party	Candidate	Votes	%
Republican	John Katko	156,236	45.4
Conservative	John Katko	21,086	6.1
Independence	John Katko	5,487	1.6
Total	John Katko (incumbent)	182,809	53.1
Democratic	Dana Balter	147,877	43.0
Working Families	Steven Williams	13,264	3.9
Total votes		343,950	100.0
Republican hold			

== District 25 ==
2020 New York's 25th congressional district election
- November 3, 2020
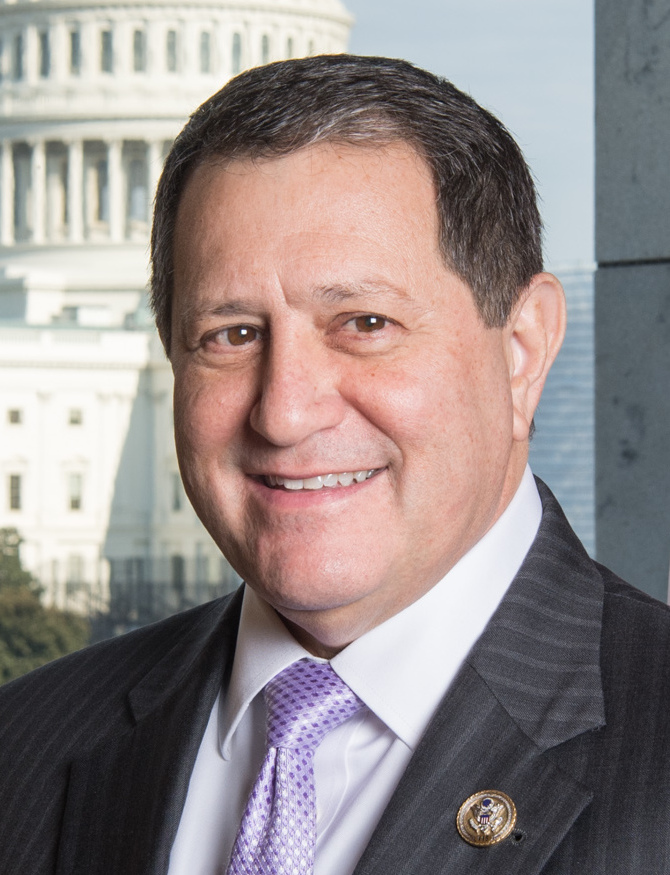

Nominee	Joseph Morelle	George Mitris
Party	Democratic	Republican
Alliance	Working Families; Independence	Conservative
Popular vote	206,396	136,198
Percentage	59.3%	39.2%
- County results Morelle: 50–60%
U.S. Representative before election
Joseph Morelle
Democratic
Elected U.S. Representative
Joseph Morelle
Democratic

The 25th district is located entirely within Monroe County, encompassing Rochester and the surrounding suburbs, including Irondequoit and Brighton. The incumbent was Democrat Joseph Morelle, who was elected with 59.0% of the vote in 2018.

=== Democratic primary ===
==== Candidates ====
===== Declared =====
- Joseph Morelle, incumbent U.S. representative
- Robin Wilt, Brighton town councilwoman and candidate for New York's 25th congressional district in 2018

===== Endorsements =====
Joseph Morelle

Organizations

- NARAL Pro-Choice America
- New York League of Conservation Voters
- Planned Parenthood Action Fund

Unions

- New York AFL–CIO
- New York State United Teachers
- Public Employees Federation

==== Primary results ====
Democratic primary results
Party	Candidate	Votes	%
Democratic	Joseph Morelle (incumbent)	42,955	68.2
Democratic	Robin Wilt	20,070	31.8
Total votes		63,009	100.0

=== Republican primary ===
==== Candidates ====
===== Declared =====
- George Mitris, businessman

=== General election ===
==== Debate ====
2020 New York's 25th congressional district debate
No.	Date	Host	Moderator	Link	Democratic	Republican
Key: P Participant A Absent N Not invited I Invited W Withdrawn						
Key: P Participant A Absent N Not invited I Invited W Withdrawn					Joseph Morelle	George Mitris
1	Oct. 14, 2020	WROC-TV	Adam Chodak		P	P

==== Predictions ====
Source	Ranking	As of
The Cook Political Report	Safe D	July 2, 2020
Inside Elections	Safe D	June 2, 2020
Sabato's Crystal Ball	Safe D	July 2, 2020
Politico	Safe D	April 19, 2020
Daily Kos	Safe D	June 3, 2020
RCP	Safe D	June 9, 2020
Niskanen	Safe D	June 7, 2020

==== Results ====
New York's 25th congressional district, 2020
Party	Candidate	Votes	%
Democratic	Joseph Morelle	187,503	53.9
Working Families	Joseph Morelle	14,584	4.2
Independence	Joseph Morelle	4,309	1.2
Total	Joseph Morelle (incumbent)	206,396	59.3
Republican	George Mitris	115,940	33.4
Conservative	George Mitris	20,258	5.8
Total	George Mitris	136,198	39.2
Libertarian	Kevin Wilson	5,325	1.5
Total votes		347,919	100.0
Democratic hold			

== District 26 ==
2020 New York's 26th congressional district election
- November 3, 2020
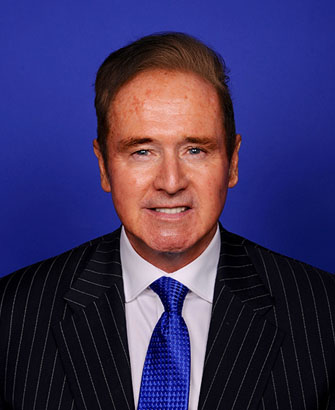

Nominee	Brian Higgins	Ricky Donovan
Party	Democratic	Republican
Alliance	Working Families; SAM
Popular vote	223,366	91,706
Percentage	69.9%	28.7%
- County results Higgins: 60–70% 70–80%
U.S. Representative before election
Brian Higgins
Democratic
Elected U.S. Representative
Brian Higgins
Democratic

The 26th district is centered around the city of Buffalo and its inner suburbs, including Cheektowaga, Tonawanda, Amherst, Grand Island, and Niagara Falls. The incumbent was Democrat Brian Higgins, who was re-elected with 73.3% of the vote in 2018.

=== Democratic primary ===
==== Candidates ====
===== Declared =====
- Brian Higgins, incumbent U.S. representative

==== Endorsements ====
Brian Higgins

Organizations

- New York League of Conservation Voters

Labor union

- Public Employees Federation

=== Republican primary ===
==== Candidates ====
===== Declared =====
- Ricky Donovan, retired corrections officer

=== General election ===
==== Predictions ====
Source	Ranking	As of
The Cook Political Report	Safe D	July 2, 2020
Inside Elections	Safe D	June 2, 2020
Sabato's Crystal Ball	Safe D	July 2, 2020
Politico	Safe D	April 19, 2020
Daily Kos	Safe D	June 3, 2020
RCP	Safe D	June 9, 2020
Niskanen	Safe D	June 7, 2020

==== Results ====
New York's 26th congressional district, 2020
Party	Candidate	Votes	%
Democratic	Brian Higgins	202,400	63.3
Working Families	Brian Higgins	20,309	6.4
SAM	Brian Higgins	657	0.2
Total	Brian Higgins (incumbent)	223,366	69.9
Republican	Ricky Donovan	91,706	28.7
Green	Michael Raleigh	4,631	1.4
Total votes		319,703	100.0
Democratic hold			

== District 27 ==
2020 New York's 27th congressional district election
- November 3, 2020
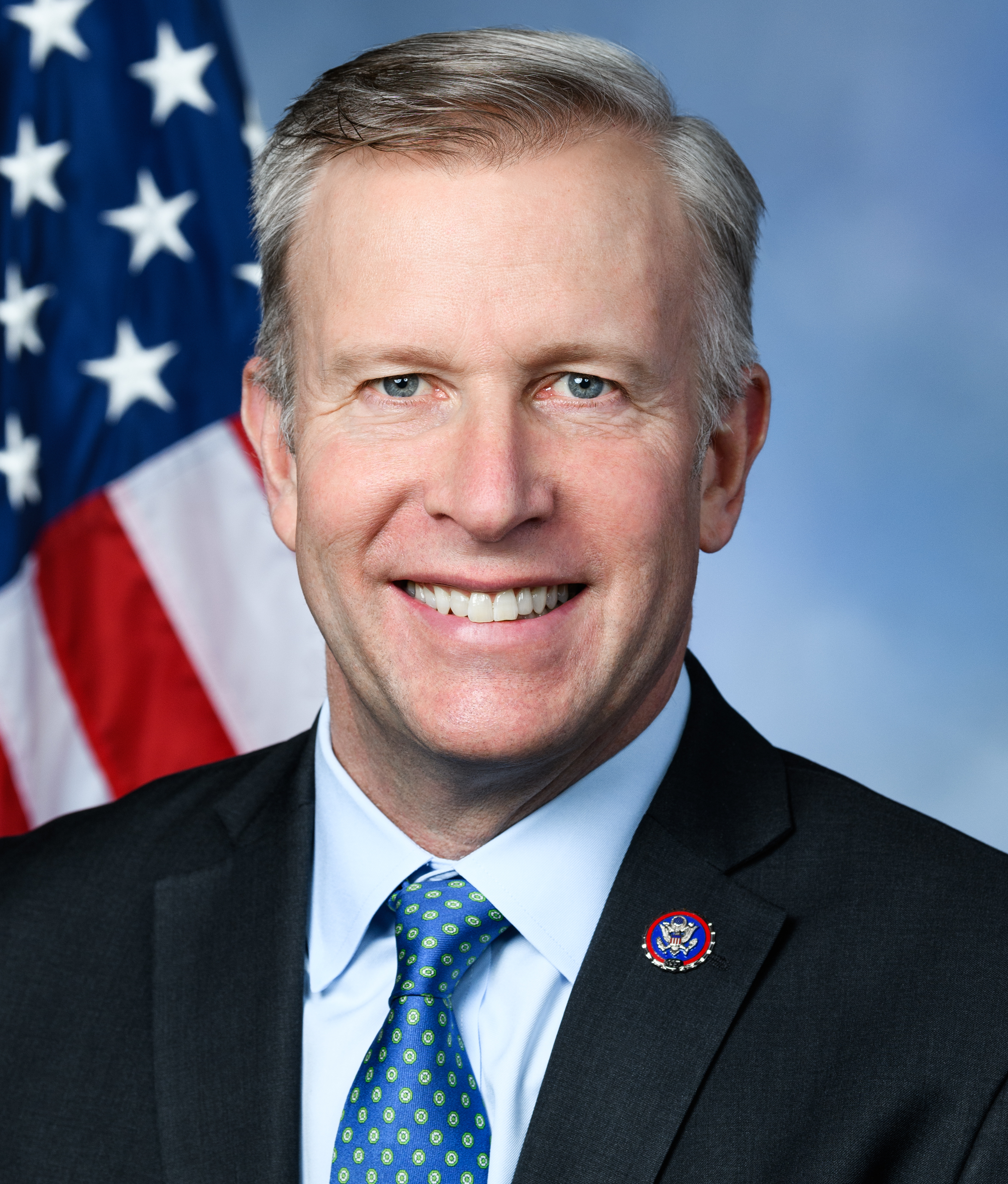

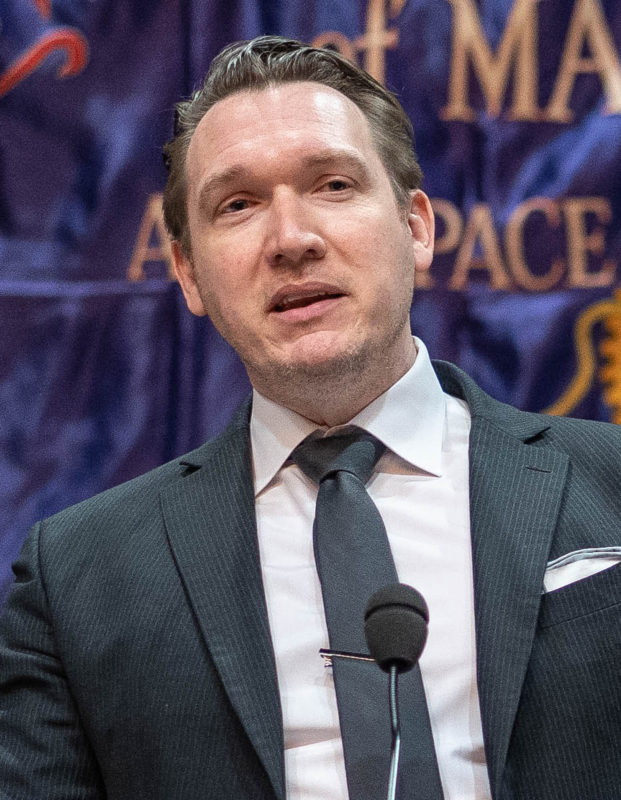
Nominee	Chris Jacobs	Nate McMurray
Party	Republican	Democratic
Alliance	Conservative; Independence	Working Families
Popular vote	228,885	149,449
Percentage	59.7%	39.0%
- County results Jacobs: 50–60% 60–70% 70–80%
U.S. Representative before election
Chris Jacobs
Republican
Elected U.S. Representative
Chris Jacobs
Republican

The 27th district is based in rural western New York and covers the outer suburbs of Buffalo and Rochester. The former incumbent Republican Chris Collins, pled guilty to charges of insider trading and resigned his seat effective immediately on October 1, 2019. Republican Chris Jacobs won the special election to replace Collins on June 23, 2020.

=== Republican primary ===
==== Candidates ====
===== Declared =====
- Chris Jacobs, state senator
- Stefan Mychajliw, Erie County comptroller
- Beth Parlato, attorney and former Darien town justice

==== Endorsements ====
Chris Jacobs

Organizations

- New York Young Republican Club

==== Polling ====
Hypothetical polling

Collins vs. Jacobs vs. Parlato

Poll source	Date(s) administered	Sample size	Margin of error	Chris Collins	Chris Jacobs	Beth Parlato	Other	Undecided
Tel Opinion Research	July 31 – August 1, 2019	500 (V)	–	46%	26%	4%	0% (Note: "Refused" with 0%)	24%

Collins vs. Mychajlw vs. Parlato

Poll source	Date(s) administered	Sample size	Margin of error	Chris Jacobs	Stefan Mychajlw	Beth Parlato	Other	Undecided
Tel Opinion Research	July 31 – August 1, 2019	500 (V)	–	39%	16%	6%	3% (Note: "Refused" with 3%)	39%

Bellavia vs. Hawley vs. Jacobs vs. Mychajlw vs. Ortt vs. Parlato

Poll source	Date(s) administered	Sample size	Margin of error	David Bellavia	Chris Jacobs	Stefan Mychajlw	Other	Undecided
Tel Opinion Research	July 31 – August 1, 2019	500 (V)	–	33%	24%	6%	14% (Note: Hawley and Ortt with 5%; Parlato with 4%; "refused" with 0%)	24%

Bellavia vs. Jacobs vs. Parlato

Poll source	Date(s) administered	Sample size	Margin of error	David Bellavia	Chris Jacobs	Beth Parlato	Other	Undecided
Tel Opinion Research	July 31 – August 1, 2019	500 (V)	–	41%	27%	6%	0%	26%

==== Primary results ====
Republican primary results
Party	Candidate	Votes	%
Republican	Chris Jacobs	40,459	59.6
Republican	Beth Parlato	14,805	21.8
Republican	Stefan Mychajliw	12,650	18.6
Total votes		67,914	100.0

=== Democratic primary ===
==== Candidates ====
===== Declared =====
- Nate McMurray, former Grand Island supervisor and nominee for this district in 2018

==== Endorsements ====
Nate McMurray

Organizations

- New York League of Conservation Voters

Labor unions

- Public Employees Federation

=== General election ===
==== Predictions ====
Source	Ranking	As of
The Cook Political Report	Safe R	July 2, 2020
Inside Elections	Safe R	June 2, 2020
Sabato's Crystal Ball	Likely R	October 20, 2020
Politico	Likely R	April 19, 2020
Daily Kos	Safe R	June 3, 2020
RCP	Likely R	June 9, 2020
Niskanen	Likely R	June 7, 2020

==== Results ====
New York's 27th congressional district, 2020
Party	Candidate	Votes	%
Republican	Chris Jacobs	192,619	50.2
Conservative	Chris Jacobs	31,006	8.1
Independence	Chris Jacobs	5,260	1.4
Total	Chris Jacobs (incumbent)	228,885	59.7
Democratic	Nate McMurray	136,686	35.7
Working Families	Nate McMurray	12,763	3.3
Total	Nate McMurray	149,449	39.0
Libertarian	Duane Whitmer	4,877	1.3
Total votes		383,211	100.0
Republican hold			

== See also ==
- 2020 New York state elections

== Notes ==
Partisan clients
