= 2026 United States House of Representatives elections in New York =

- November 3, 2026

All 26 New York seats to the United States House of Representatives
- Reporting: 92.6% as of Nov 7 at 5:16 PM EST
	Majority party	Minority party
Party	Democratic	Republican
Last election	19	7
Seats before	19	7
Seats after	20	6
Seat change	▲1	▼1
Popular vote	3,712,993	2,255,616
Percentage	61.79%	37.54%
Swing	▲4.58%	▼4.98%

Democratic hold Democratic gain
Republican hold
Democratic
50–60%
60–70%
70–80%
80–90%
Republican
50–60%
60–70%
70–80%

Elections were held on November 3, 2026, to elect the 26 U.S. representatives from the state of New York, one from each of the state's congressional districts. The elections coincided with other elections to the House of Representatives, elections to the United States Senate, and various state and local elections. The primary election took place on June 23, 2026. As the state of New York has closed primary elections, only registered party members were allowed to vote in each party's primary.

Progressive and DSA candidates in New York City had a successful primary night, defeating more establishment and pro-Israel Democratic incumbents in the 10th and 13th districts and winning the open 7th district in a landslide, in what was described as a "clean sweep" and a show of strength for Mayor Zohran Mamdani and the Democratic Socialists of America.

== Failed redistricting attempt ==
Voters in NY-11 filed a lawsuit in October 2025, claiming the Staten Island-based district illegally dilutes the power of Black and Hispanic voters in the district. Acting New York Supreme Court Justice Jeffrey Pearlman ordered the independent redistricting commission to make new maps to reconfigure NY-11 by February 6, 2026. The deadline was suspended after Rep. Malliotakis, who represents the district, appealed the ruling. On March 2, the U.S. Supreme Court temporarily blocked Pearlman's order, allowing the state's current map to be used for the 2026 election.

== Statewide polling ==
=== Statewide congressional polls ===
Poll source	Date(s) administered	Sample size (Note: Key: A – all adults RV – registered voters LV – likely voters V – unclear)	Margin of error	Democratic	Republican	Other	Undecided
Marist University	October 22–25, 2026	(LV)	–	56%	42%	1% (Note: "Another party's candidate" with 1%; "No response" with <1%)	1%
Marist University	October 22–25, 2026	1,448 (RV)	± 3.5%	57%	41%	2% (Note: "Another party's candidate" with 2%; "No response" with <1%)	1%

== District 1 ==
2026 New York's 1st congressional district election
- Reporting: 97% as of Nov 5 at 12:00 PM EST
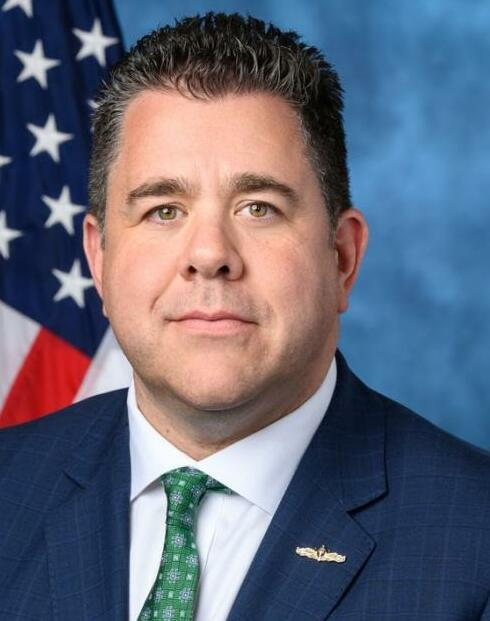

Nominee	Nick LaLota	Chris Gallant
Party	Republican	Democratic
Alliance	Conservative
Popular vote	152,546	145,869
Percentage	51.1%	48.9%
- County results LaLota: 50–60%
U.S. Representative before election
Nick LaLota
Republican
Elected U.S. Representative
Nick LaLota
Republican

The 1st district is based on the eastern end and North Shore of Long Island, including the Hamptons, the North Fork, Riverhead, Port Jefferson, Smithtown, and Shelter Island, all in Suffolk County. The incumbent is Republican Nick LaLota, who was re-elected with 55.52% of the vote in 2024.

=== Republican primary ===
==== Nominee ====
- Nick LaLota, incumbent U.S. representative

==== Endorsements ====
Nick LaLota

Labor unions

- American Federation of Government Employees

Organizations

- Log Cabin Republicans

==== Fundraising ====
Campaign finance reports as of June 3, 2026
Candidate	Raised	Spent	Cash on hand
Nick LaLota (R)	$3,317,401	$1,009,728	$2,983,750
Source: Federal Election Commission

=== Democratic primary ===
==== Nominee ====
- Chris Gallant, air traffic controller

==== Eliminated in primary ====
- Lukas Ventouras, member of the Huntington Democratic Committee

==== Disqualified ====
- Jonathan Jacobs

==== Withdrawn ====
- Luca Nascimbene

==== Declined ====
- John Avlon, former CNN reporter, co-founder of No Labels, and nominee for this district in 2024 (endorsed Gallant)

==== Endorsements ====
Chris Gallant

Executive branch officials

- Pete Buttigieg, former secretary of transportation (2021–2025)

State legislators

- Steve Englebright, former AD-04 (1992–2022)
- Fred Thiele, former AD-01 (1995–2024)

Individuals

- John Avlon, political commentator and journalist and nominee for this district in 2024

Organizations

- Planned Parenthood Action Fund

Political parties

- New York Working Families Party
Lukas Ventouras

Organizations

- Center for Freethought Equality PAC
- Track AIPAC

==== Fundraising ====
Campaign finance reports as of June 3, 2026
Candidate	Raised	Spent	Cash on hand
Chris Gallant (D)	$515,866	$434,125	$81,740
Lukas Ventouras (D)	$120,655	$115,969	$21,345
Source: Federal Election Commission

==== Results ====
Democratic primary results
Party	Candidate	Votes	%
Democratic	Chris Gallant	12,492	62.9
Democratic	Lukas Ventouras	7,349	37.0
Write-in		30	0.2
Total votes		19,871	100.0

=== Independents ===
==== Withdrawn ====
- Jordan Maggio
- Thomas Sorensen

=== General election ===
==== Predictions ====
Source	Ranking	As of
Decision Desk HQ	Lean R	July 14, 2026
The Cook Political Report	Solid R	February 6, 2025
Inside Elections	Solid R	March 7, 2025
Sabato's Crystal Ball	Likely R	September 18, 2025

==== Post-primary endorsements ====
Nick LaLota (R)

Executive branch officials

- Donald Trump, 45th and 47th president of the United States (2017–2021, 2025–present)

==== Fundraising ====
Campaign finance reports as of September 30, 2026
Candidate	Raised	Spent	Cash on hand
Nick LaLota (R)	$4,404,345	$2,348,141	$2,732,281
Chris Gallant (D)	$1,577,423	$967,650	$609,773
Source: Federal Election Commission

==== Polling ====
Nick LaLota vs. Chris Gallant

Poll source	Date(s) administered	Sample size	Margin of error	Nick LaLota (R)	Chris Gallant (D)	Undecided
Public Policy Polling (D) (Note: Poll sponsored by House Majority PAC, which is focused on electing Democrats to the U.S. House of Representatives)	December 10–11, 2025	579 (V)	–	41%	38%	20%

==== Results ====
2026 New York's 1st congressional district election
Party	Candidate	Votes	%	±%
Republican	Nick LaLota			
Conservative	Nick LaLota			
Total	Nick LaLota (incumbent)			
Democratic	Chris Gallant			
Total votes				

== District 2 ==
2026 New York's 2nd congressional district election
- Reporting: 97% as of Nov 6 at 10:29 AM EST
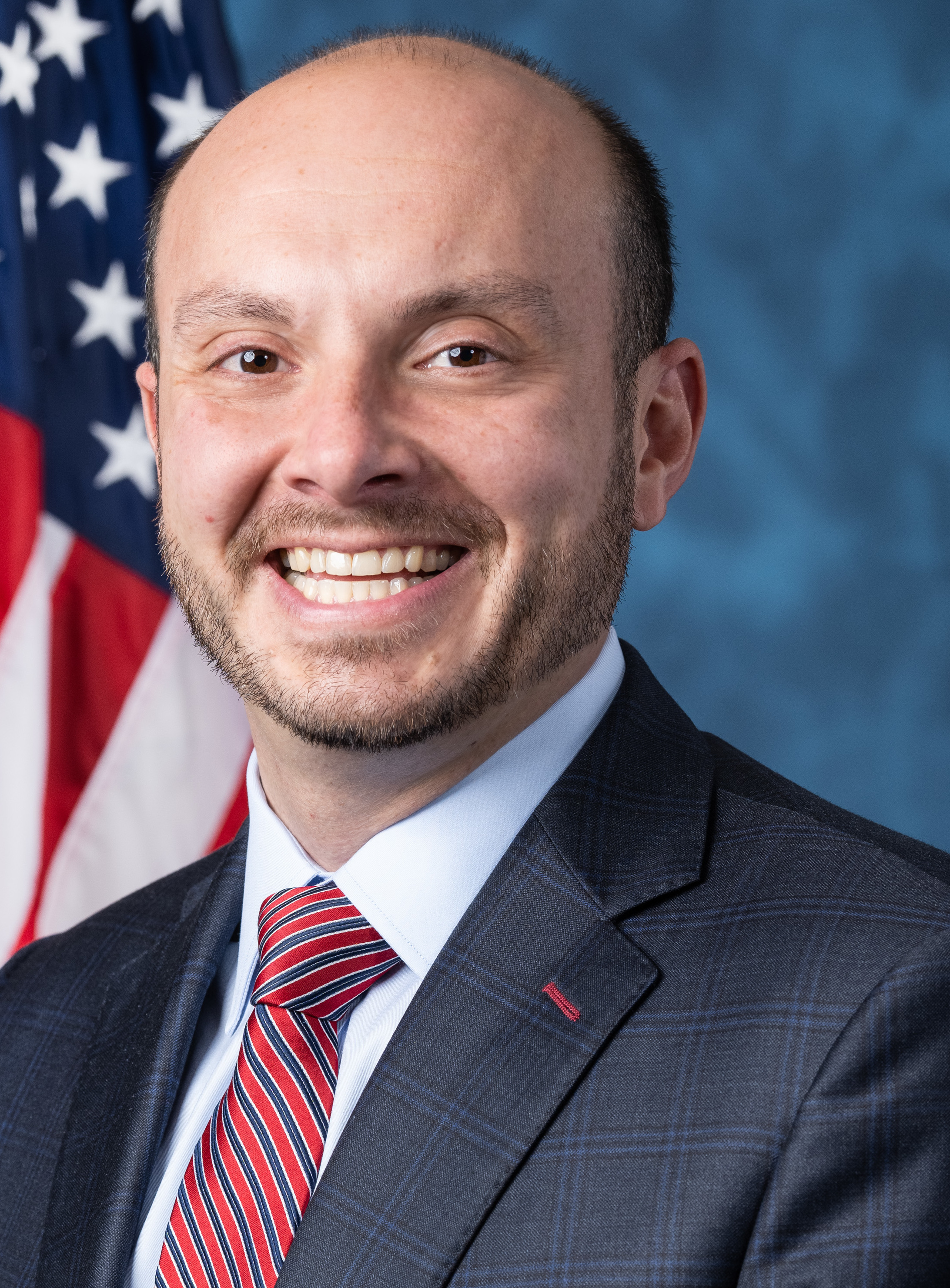

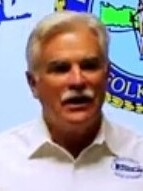
Nominee	Andrew Garbarino	Patrick Halpin
Party	Republican	Democratic
Alliance	Conservative	Working Families
Popular vote	128,184	120,263
Percentage	51.6%	48.4%
- County results Garbarino: 60–70% Halpin: 50–60%
U.S. Representative before election
Andrew Garbarino
Republican
Elected U.S. Representative
Andrew Garbarino
Republican

The 2nd district is based on the South Shore of Suffolk County, including the towns of Babylon, Islip, and most of Brookhaven all in Suffolk County, and Massapequa in Nassau County. The incumbent was Republican Andrew Garbarino, who was re-elected with 59.8% of the vote in 2024.

=== Republican primary ===
==== Nominee ====
- Andrew Garbarino, incumbent U.S. representative

==== Endorsements ====
Andrew Garbarino

Executive branch officials

- Donald Trump, 45th and 47th president of the United States (2017–2021, 2025–present)

Organizations

- Log Cabin Republicans

Political parties

- Conservative Party of New York State

==== Fundraising ====
Campaign finance reports as of June 3, 2026
Candidate	Raised	Spent	Cash on hand
Andrew Garbarino (R)	$2,805,494	$1,529,140	$2,821,960
Source: Federal Election Commission

=== Democratic primary ===
==== Nominee ====
- Patrick Halpin, former Suffolk County executive (1988–1991)

==== Disqualified ====
- Jess Murphy, real estate investment manager

==== Withdrawn ====
- Garrett Petersen, deputy chair of the Islip Democrats and nominee for New York's 7th State Assembly district in 2024
- Joshua Taveras, store manager

==== Endorsements ====
Pat Halpin

Political parties

- New York Working Families Party

==== Fundraising ====
Italics indicate a withdrawn candidate.

Campaign finance reports as of June 3, 2026
Candidate	Raised	Spent	Cash on hand
Patrick Halpin (D)	$427,897	$345,252	$82,645
Source: Federal Election Commission

=== General election ===
==== Predictions ====
Source	Ranking	As of
Decision Desk HQ	Likely R	July 14, 2026
The Cook Political Report	Solid R	February 6, 2025
Inside Elections	Solid R	March 7, 2025
Sabato's Crystal Ball	Safe R	September 18, 2025

==== Fundraising ====
Campaign finance reports as of September 30, 2026
Candidate	Raised	Spent	Cash on hand
Andrew Garbarino (R)	$3,987,832	$2,215,370	$3,318,068
Patrick Halpin (D)	$576,578	$530,425	$46,153
Source: Federal Election Commission

==== Results ====
2026 New York's 2nd congressional district election
Party	Candidate	Votes	%	±%
Republican	Andrew Garbarino			
Conservative	Andrew Garbarino			
Total	Andrew Garbarino (incumbent)			
Democratic	Patrick Halpin			
Working Families	Patrick Halpin			
Total	Patrick Halpin			
Total votes				

== District 3 ==
2026 New York's 3rd congressional district election
- Reporting: 97% as of Nov 6 at 10:29 AM EST
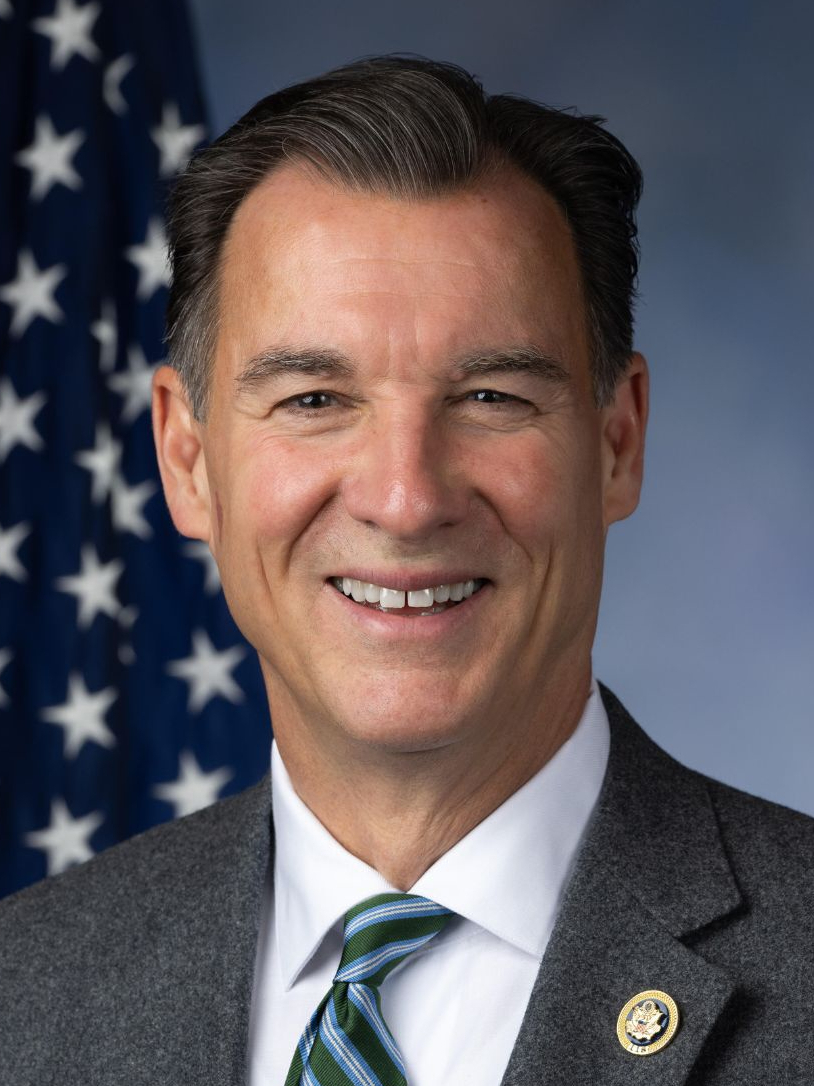

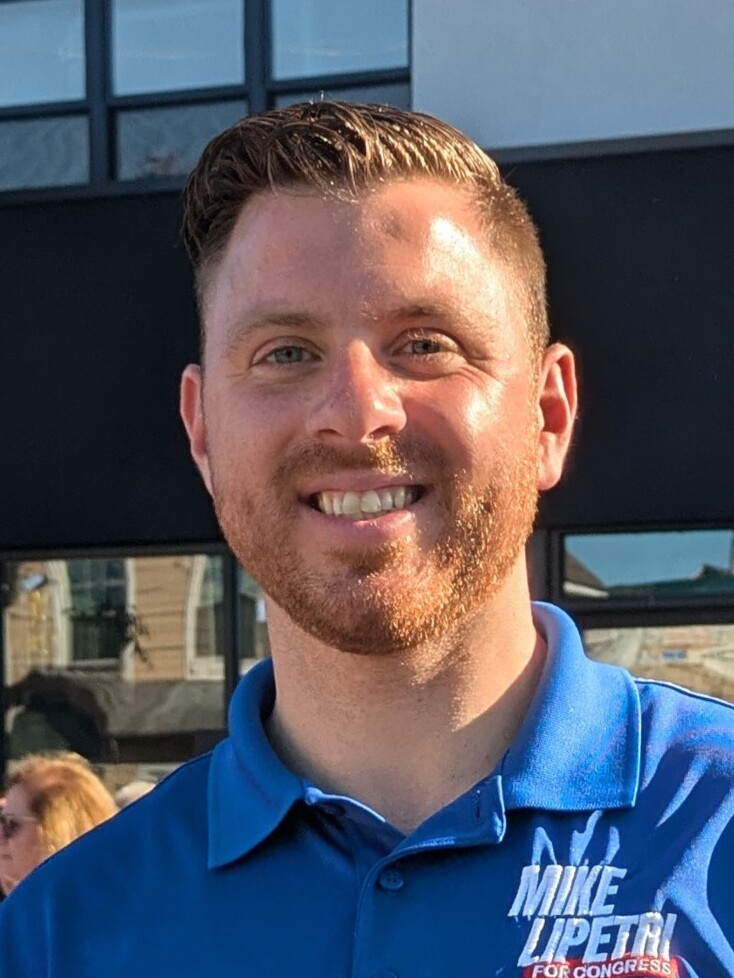
Nominee	Tom Suozzi	Mike LiPetri
Party	Democratic	Republican
Alliance		Conservative
Popular vote	149,547	122,442
Percentage	54.8%	44.9%
- County results Suozzi: 50–60% 60–70%
U.S. Representative before election
Tom Suozzi
Democratic
Elected U.S. Representative
Tom Suozzi
Democratic

The 3rd district is based on the North Shore of Nassau County, including all of Glen Cove and North Hempstead, parts of Oyster Bay, and Hempstead, and the Northeast Queens neighborhoods of Whitestone, Beechhurst, Little Neck, and Douglaston. The incumbent is Democrat Tom Suozzi, who was re-elected with 51.8% of the vote in 2024.

=== Democratic primary ===
==== Nominee ====
- Tom Suozzi, incumbent U.S. representative

==== Eliminated in primary ====
- Danielle Welch, public defender

==== Endorsements ====
Tom Suozzi

Labor unions

- Communication Workers of America District 1
- Council of School Supervisors & Administrators
- NYC District Council of Carpenters

Organizations

- AIPAC
- Brady Campaign
- Democratic Majority for Israel
- End Citizens United
- Giffords
- Jewish Democratic Council of America
- Joint Action Committee for Political Affairs
- League of Conservation Voters Action Fund
- Natural Resources Defense Council
- New York League of Conservation Voters
- Reproductive Freedom for All
- WelcomePAC
Danielle Welch

Organizations

- Showing Up for Racial Justice

==== Fundraising ====
Campaign finance reports as of June 3, 2026
Candidate	Raised	Spent	Cash on hand
Tom Suozzi (D)	$4,997,581	$1,535,359	$5,496,563
Danielle Welch (D)	$45,810	$38,005	$7,805
Source: Federal Election Commission

==== Results ====
Democratic primary results
Party	Candidate	Votes	%
Democratic	Tom Suozzi (incumbent)	21,501	79.3
Democratic	Danielle Welch	5,553	20.5
Write-in		69	0.3
Total votes		27,123	100.0

=== Republican primary ===
==== Nominee ====
- Mike LiPetri, former state assemblyman from the 9th district (2019–2021), candidate for the 2nd district in 2020, and nominee for this district in 2024

==== Eliminated in primary ====
- Greg Hach, attorney and candidate for this district in 2024

==== Endorsements ====
Greg Hach

Local officials

- Rudy Giuliani, former mayor of New York City (1994–2001)
Mike LiPetri

Executive branch officials

- Donald Trump, president of the United States (2017–2021, 2025–present)

U.S. representatives

- Tom Emmer, House majority whip (2023–present) from MN-06 (2015–present)
- Richard Hudson, NC-09 (2013–present)

Local officials

- Bruce Blakeman, Nassau County executive (2022–present) and 2026 gubernatorial candidate

Political parties

- Conservative Party of New York State

Labor unions

- International Union of Operating Engineers Local 138

Organizations

- NRCC MAGA Majority

Party branches

- Nassau County Republican Party

==== Fundraising ====
Campaign finance reports as of June 3, 2026
Candidate	Raised	Spent	Cash on hand
Greg Hach (R)	$526,877	$477,698	$58,415
Mike LiPetri (R)	$993,324	$281,474	$727,639
Source: Federal Election Commission

==== Results ====
Republican primary results
Party	Candidate	Votes	%
Republican	Mike LiPetri	11,077	81.9
Republican	Greg Hach	2,325	17.2
Write-in		119	0.9
Total votes		13,521	100.0

=== General election ===
==== Predictions ====
Source	Ranking	As of
Decision Desk HQ	Likely D	July 14, 2026
The Cook Political Report	Likely D	October 9, 2026
Inside Elections	Lean D	March 7, 2025
Sabato's Crystal Ball	Lean D	September 18, 2025

==== Post-primary endorsements ====
Tom Suozzi (D)

Organizations

- U.S. Chamber of Commerce
Mike LiPetri (R)

U.S. representatives

- Mike Johnson, speaker of the House (2023–present) from LA-04 (2017–present)

==== Fundraising ====
Campaign finance reports as of October 14, 2026
Candidate	Raised	Spent	Cash on hand
Tom Suozzi (D)	$7,599,603	$6,399,603	$3,234,342
Mike LiPetri (R)	$2,584,014	$2,143,461	$456,873
Source: Federal Election Commission

==== Results ====
2026 New York's 3rd congressional district election
Party	Candidate	Votes	%	±%
Democratic	Tom Suozzi (incumbent)			
Republican	Mike LiPetri			
Conservative	Mike LiPetri			
Total	Mike LiPetri			
Total votes				

== District 4 ==
2026 New York's 4th congressional district election
- Reporting: 98% as of Nov 6 at 10:29 AM EST
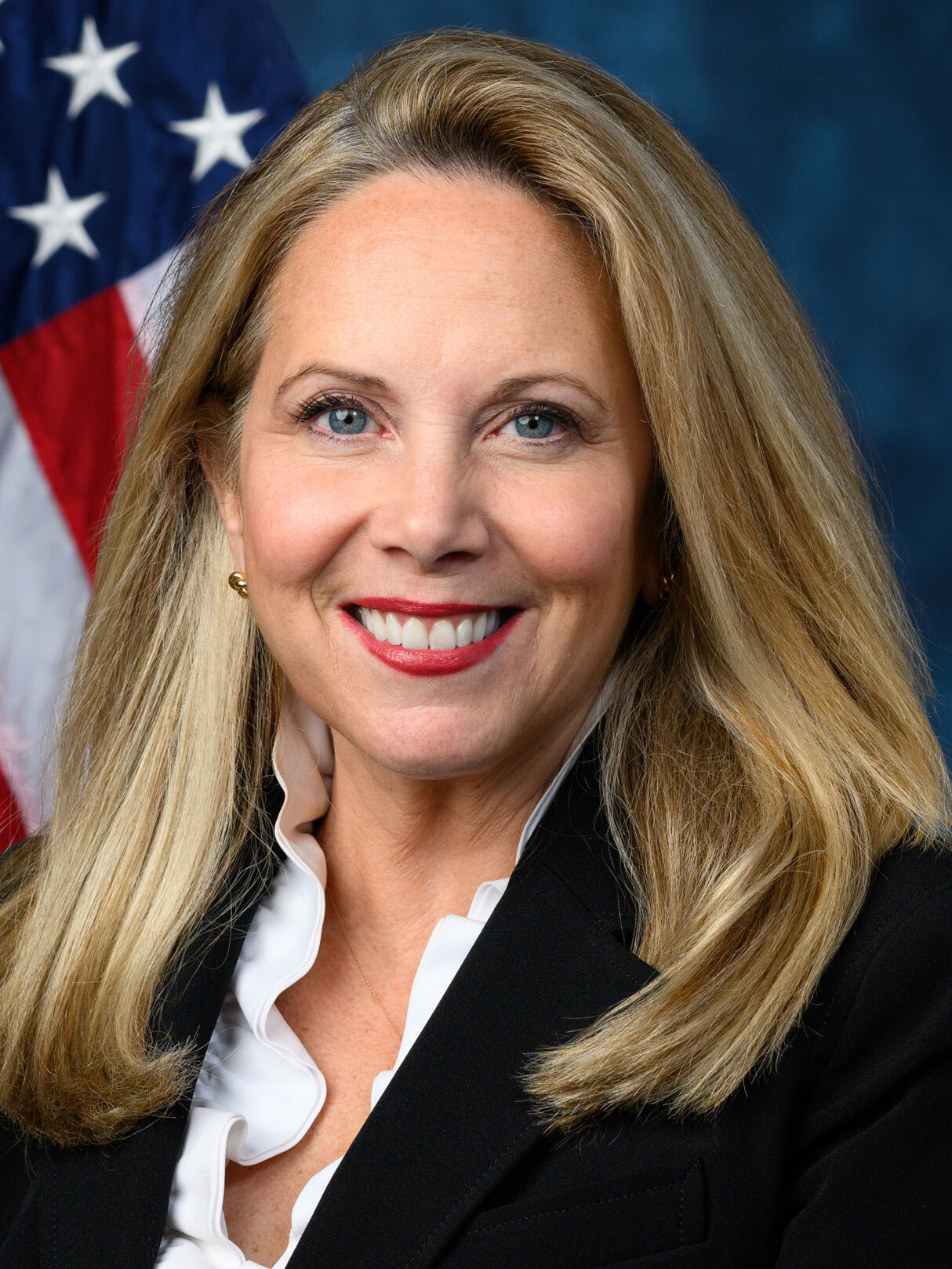

Nominee	Laura Gillen	Jeanine Driscoll
Party	Democratic	Republican
Alliance		Conservative
Popular vote	162,077	125,333
Percentage	56.2%	43.5%
- County results Gillen: 50–60%
U.S. Representative before election
Laura Gillen
Democratic
Elected U.S. Representative
Laura Gillen
Democratic

The 4th district is based on the South Shore of Nassau County and is entirely within the town of Hempstead. The incumbent is Democrat Laura Gillen, who flipped the district and was elected with 51.1% of the vote in 2024. She is running for re-election.

=== Democratic primary ===
==== Nominee ====
- Laura Gillen, incumbent U.S. representative

==== Disqualified ====
- Kiana Bierria-Anderson, activist
- Nick Sciretta, stagehand

==== Withdrawn ====
- Taylor Darling, former state assemblymember from the 18th district (2019–2024) and candidate for New York's 6th State Senate district in 2024
- Gian Jones, businessman and candidate for this district in 2024

==== Endorsements ====
Laura Gillen

U.S. representatives

- Pete Aguilar, CA-33 (2015–present)
- Katherine Clark, House minority whip (2023–present) from MA-05 (2013–present)
- Hakeem Jeffries, House minority leader (2023–present) from NY-08 (2013–present)
- Gregory Meeks, NY-05 (1998–present)

Party officials

- Jay Jacobs, chair of the New York State Democratic Party (2019–present)

Labor unions

- Communication Workers of America District 1
- New York State United Teachers

Organizations

- AIPAC
- Brady Campaign
- Democratic Majority for Israel
- Elect Democratic Women
- EMILY's List
- End Citizens United
- Giffords
- Jewish Democratic Council of America
- Joint Action Committee for Political Affairs
- League of Conservation Voters Action Fund
- Natural Resources Defense Council
- Reproductive Freedom for All
Kiana Bierria-Anderson (disqualified)

Organizations

- Hofstra University College Democrats
Taylor Darling (withdrawn)

Organizations

- Showing Up for Racial Justice

==== Fundraising ====
Campaign finance reports as of June 3, 2026
Candidate	Raised	Spent	Cash on hand
Laura Gillen (D)	$4,587,185	$1,188,926	$3,421,462
Source: Federal Election Commission

=== Republican primary ===
==== Nominee ====
- Jeanine Driscoll, Hempstead receiver of taxes

==== Eliminated in primary ====
- Marvin Williams, U.S. Air Force veteran

==== Disqualified ====
- Michael Mandel, attorney

==== Withdrawn ====
- John DeGrace, former mayor of Valley Stream

==== Declined ====
- Anthony D'Esposito, inspector general of the U.S. Department of Labor (2026–present) and former U.S. representative (2023–2025)

==== Fundraising ====
Campaign finance reports as of March 31, 2026
Candidate	Raised	Spent	Cash on hand
Dennis McGrath (R)	$10,000	$8,910	$1,089
Source: Federal Election Commission

==== Results ====
Republican primary results
Party	Candidate	Votes	%
Republican	Jeanine Driscoll	13,063	90.8
Republican	Marvin Williams	1,278	8.9
Write-in		53	0.4
Total votes		14,394	100.0

=== Independent and third-party candidates ===
==== Declared ====
- Blay Tarnoff (Libertarian), systems engineer

=== General election ===
==== Predictions ====
Source	Ranking	As of
Decision Desk HQ	Likely D	July 14, 2026
The Cook Political Report	Likely D	October 9, 2026
Inside Elections	Tilt D	March 7, 2025
Sabato's Crystal Ball	Likely D	October 20, 2026

==== Post-primary endorsements ====
Jeanine Driscoll (R)

Executive branch officials

- Donald Trump, 45th and 47th president of the United States (2017–2021, 2025–present)

Local officials

- Bruce Blakeman, Nassau County Executive (2022–present) and 2026 gubernatorial candidate

Organizations

- NRCC

==== Fundraising ====
Campaign finance reports as of September 30, 2026
Candidate	Raised	Spent	Cash on hand
Laura Gillen (D)	$6,021,061	$2,103,344	$3,940,920
Jeanine Driscoll (R)	$664,552	$393,668	$270,884
Source: Federal Election Commission

==== Results ====
2026 New York's 4th congressional district election
Party	Candidate	Votes	%	±%
Democratic	Laura Gillen (incumbent)			
Republican	Jeanine Driscoll			
Conservative	Jeanine Driscoll			
Total	Jeanine Driscoll			
Libertarian	Blay Tarnoff			
Total votes				

== District 5 ==
2026 New York's 5th congressional district election
- Reporting: 91% as of Nov 5 at 4:32 PM EST
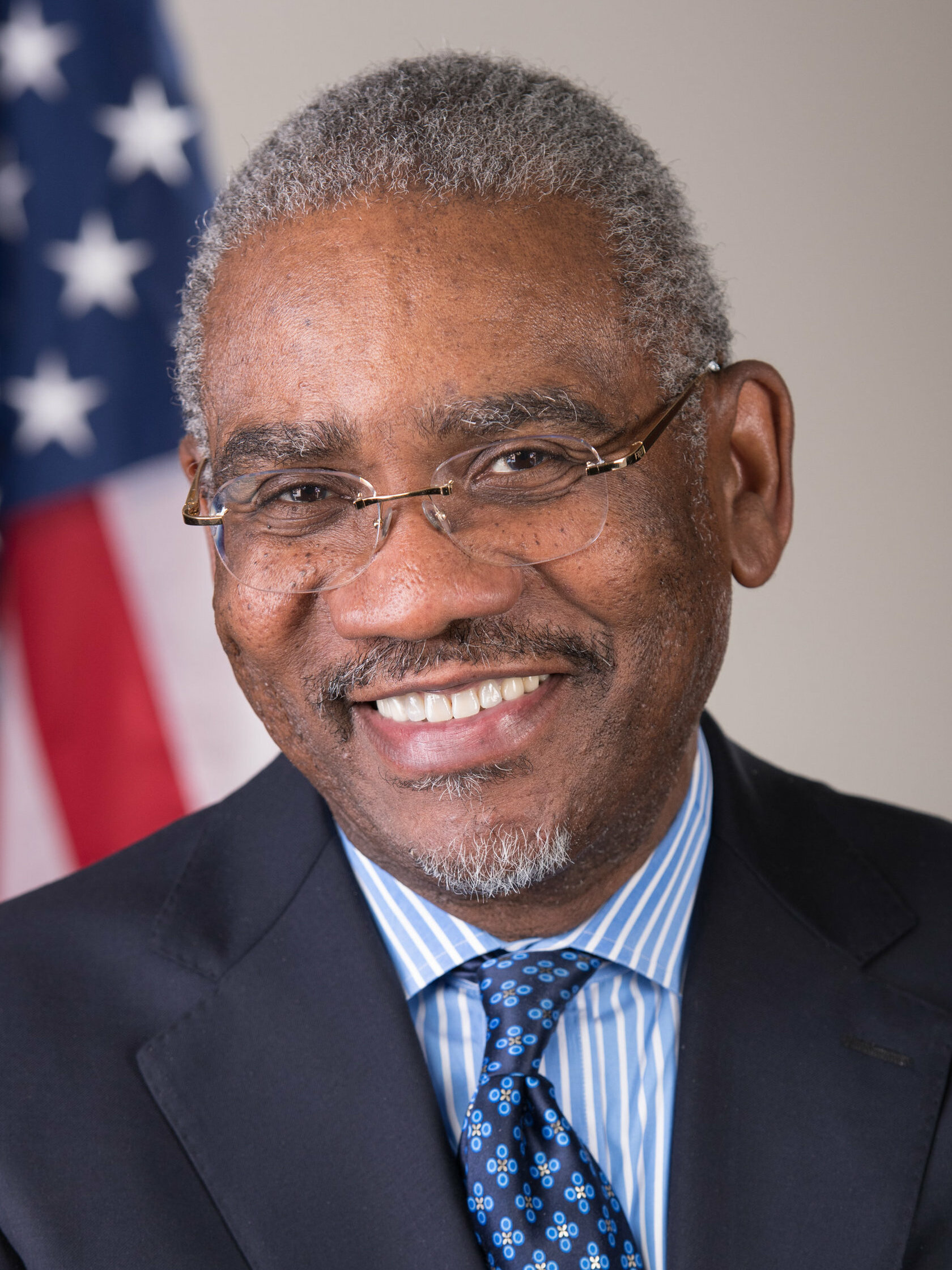

Nominee	Gregory Meeks	George Marsh
Party	Democratic	Republican
Popular vote	129,931	31,082
Percentage	80.5%	19.3%
- County results Meeks: 80–90%
U.S. Representative before election
Gregory Meeks
Democratic
Elected U.S. Representative
Gregory Meeks
Democratic

The 5th district is based in Southeast Queens, including the neighborhoods of Jamaica, Hollis, Laurelton, Richmond Hill, Ozone Park, Howard Beach, and the Rockaways. The district is currently represented by Gregory Meeks, first elected in 1998, who was re-elected with 72.9% of the vote in 2024.

=== Democratic primary ===
==== Nominee ====
- Gregory Meeks, incumbent U.S. representative

==== Disqualified ====
- Salvatore Padellaro, entrepreneur

==== Endorsements ====
Gregory Meeks

Labor unions

- Communication Workers of America District 1
- Council of School Supervisors & Administrators
- District Council 37
- NYC District Council of Carpenters

Organizations

- AIPAC
- Democratic Majority for Israel
- J Street PAC
- Planned Parenthood Action Fund
- Population Connection
Salvatore Padellaro (disqualified)

Organizations

- Track AIPAC

==== Fundraising ====
Campaign finance reports as of June 3, 2026
Candidate	Raised	Spent	Cash on hand
Gregory Meeks (D)	$1,575,073	$1,854,342	$1,949,283
Source: Federal Election Commission

=== Republican primary ===
==== Nominee ====
- George Marsh, former employee of the NYC Mayor's Office

==== Disqualified ====
- Aaron Cherry
- Alexandria Foxworth

=== General election ===
==== Predictions ====
Source	Ranking	As of
Decision Desk HQ	Safe D	July 14, 2026
The Cook Political Report	Solid D	February 6, 2025
Inside Elections	Solid D	March 7, 2025
Sabato's Crystal Ball	Safe D	September 18, 2025

==== Fundraising ====
Campaign finance reports as of September 30, 2026
Candidate	Raised	Spent	Cash on hand
Gregory Meeks (D)	$2,243,646	$2,343,532	$2,128,667
Source: Federal Election Commission

==== Results ====
2026 New York's 5th congressional district election
Party	Candidate	Votes	%	±%
Democratic	Gregory Meeks (incumbent)			
Republican	George Marsh			
Queens United	George Marsh			
Total	George Marsh			
Total votes				

== District 6 ==
2026 New York's 6th congressional district election
- Reporting: 88% as of Nov 5 at 4:32 PM EST
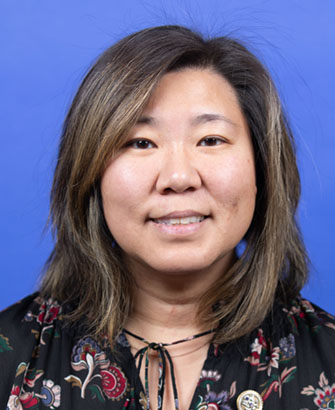

Nominee	Grace Meng	Joseph Chou
Party	Democratic	Republican
Alliance		Conservative
Popular vote	92,474	41,225
Percentage	68.6%	30.6%
- County results Meng: 60–70%
U.S. Representative before election
Grace Meng
Democratic
Elected U.S. Representative
Grace Meng
Democratic

The 6th district is based in Central and Eastern Queens, including the neighborhoods of Woodside, Jackson Heights, Elmhurst, Kew Gardens, Flushing, Bayside, and Fresh Meadows. Incumbent Democrat Grace Meng, who was re-elected with 60.7% of the vote in 2024, is running for re-election.

=== Democratic primary ===
==== Campaign ====
Incumbent Congresswoman Grace Meng had first been elected in 2012, and had built strong political connections with the Queens Democratic Party and with the broader Democratic establishment. She faced a primary attempt from Chuck Park, a former diplomat and political staffer who ran to her left.

Park campaigned against Meng's acceptance of donations from the American Israel Public Affairs Committee (AIPAC), her support for the Metropolitan Park casino project, and her lack of vigor in opposing United States Immigration and Customs Enforcement (ICE). Meng in turn campaigned on her experience, alleging that Park was more interested in grandstanding than achieving legislative results.

==== Nominee ====
- Grace Meng, incumbent U.S. representative

==== Eliminated in primary ====
- Chuck Park, former chief of staff for New York City councilmember Shekar Krishnan

==== Disqualified ====
- Xiong Yan, Chinese dissident and candidate for New York's 10th congressional district in 2022

==== Endorsements ====
Grace Meng

U.S. senators

- Andy Kim, New Jersey (2024–present)

U.S. representatives

- Nydia Velázquez, NY-07 (1993–present)

Statewide officials

- Letitia James, attorney general of New York (2019–present)

State legislators

- John Liu, state senator from the 16th district (2019–present)

Local officials

- Shekar Krishnan, New York City councilmember from the 25th district (2022–present)

Labor unions

- 1199SEIU United Healthcare Workers East
- Communication Workers of America District 1
- Council of School Supervisors & Administrators
- District Council 37
- International Association of Sheet Metal, Air, Rail and Transportation Workers Local 28
- Laborers' International Union of North America
- National Association of Letter Carriers Local 294
- New York City Central Labor Council
- New York State AFL-CIO
- New York State Association of Letter Carriers
- New York State Nurses Association
- NYC District Council of Carpenters
- UNITE HERE Local 100

Organizations

- AIPAC
- Congressional Progressive Caucus
- Democratic Majority for Israel
- Jim Owles Liberal Democratic Club
- League of Conservation Voters Action Fund
- Planned Parenthood Action Fund
- Population Connection
- Reproductive Freedom for All
- Stonewall Democratic Club of New York
- Vote Mama
Chuck Park

State legislators

- Raj Goyle, former Kansas state representative from the 87th district (2007–2011)

Organizations

- Citizen Action of New York
- Forest Hills Indivisible
- Progressive Victory
- Sunrise NYC
- Track AIPAC
Refused to endorse

Organizations

- Working Families Party

==== Fundraising ====
Campaign finance reports as of June 3, 2026
Candidate	Raised	Spent	Cash on hand
Grace Meng (D)	$1,692,657	$1,626,255	$1,035,288
Chuck Park (D)	$445,020	$380,689	$28,477
Source: Federal Election Commission

==== Results ====
Meng defeated Park by a 14 percent margin; a poor performance for an incumbent and a substantially lower margin than many observers expected. Meng's best areas were those that were majority-white, with the incumbent performing strongly in Kew Gardens Hills, Maspeth and Middle Village. Park's best performances were in the neighborhood of Woodside and among Korean voters in Flushing.

Results by precinct Meng: 40–50%; 50–60%; 60–70%; 70–80%; 80–90%; 90–100%; 100%; Park: 40–50%; 50–60%; 60–70%; 70–80%; 100%; Tied: 40–50%; 50%

Democratic primary results
Party	Candidate	Votes	%
Democratic	Grace Meng (incumbent)	18,971	56.8
Democratic	Chuck Park	14,335	42.9
Write-in		86	0.3
Total votes		33,392	100.0

=== General election ===
==== Predictions ====
Source	Ranking	As of
Decision Desk HQ	Safe D	July 14, 2026
The Cook Political Report	Solid D	February 6, 2025
Inside Elections	Solid D	March 7, 2025
Sabato's Crystal Ball	Safe D	September 18, 2025

==== Fundraising ====
Campaign finance reports as of September 30, 2026
Candidate	Raised	Spent	Cash on hand
Grace Meng (D)	$2,171,034	$2,370,762	$769,158
Joseph Chou (R)	$2,578	$592	$4,108
Source: Federal Election Commission

==== Results ====
2026 New York's 6th congressional district election
Party	Candidate	Votes	%	±%
Democratic	Grace Meng (incumbent)			
Republican	Joseph Chou			
Conservative	Joseph Chou			
Total	Joseph Chou			
Total votes				

== District 7 ==
2026 New York's 7th congressional district election
- Reporting: 88% as of Nov 5 at 4:32 PM EST
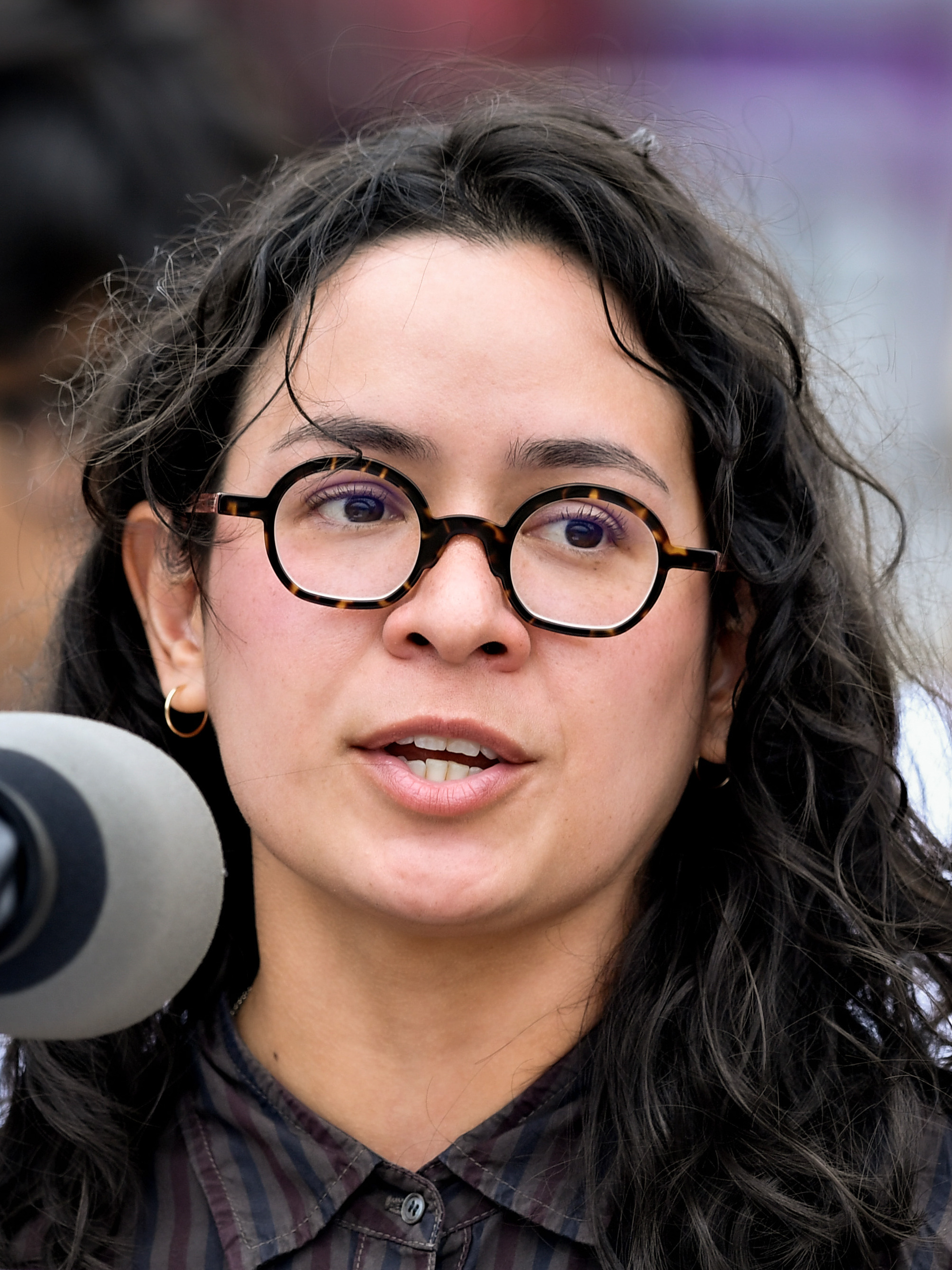

Nominee	Claire Valdez	Melvin Rivera
Party	Democratic	Republican
Alliance	Working Families	Conservative
Popular vote	135,179	24,370
Percentage	83.3%	15.0%
- County results Valdez: 70–80% 80–90%
U.S. Representative before election
Nydia Velázquez
Democratic
Elected U.S. Representative
Claire Valdez
Democratic

The 7th district is based in Brooklyn and Queens, including the neighborhoods of Clinton Hill, Williamsburg, Greenpoint, Bushwick, Woodhaven, Maspeth, Sunnyside, and Long Island City. The district is currently represented by Democrat Nydia Velázquez, who was elected with 78.1% of the vote in 2024. Velázquez is not seeking re-election.

=== Democratic primary ===
The contest for the 7th district began in November 2025 after longtime incumbent Nydia Velázquez, who had served since 1993, announced her decision to retire. Velázquez, a longtime reformer who was staunchly opposed to the political machine associated with the Brooklyn Democratic Party, had cultivated strong ties with the New York City Democratic Socialists of America (NYC-DSA) in her latter years in office, and with the 7th having a reputation as one of the most left-wing congressional districts in the country it was believed by analysts such as Trip Yang that the organization would seek to have one of its own elected as Velázquez's successor.

Velázquez initially remained neutral in the race, a decision attributed by political analyst Michael Lange to her belief that the NYC-DSA would select either state senator Julia Salazar or New York City Councilor Tiffany Cabán as their standard-bearer. However, Salazar had no interest in running, and Cabán's brief attempt to was shut down by the newly elected mayor of New York Zohran Mamdani, a member of the NYC-DSA himself, due to her having been reluctant to support Mamdani's mayoral run. Instead, Mamdani and the NYC-DSA selected first-term state assemblywoman Claire Valdez, who had been one of the mayor's earliest and most enthusiastic endorsers, as their candidate. Velázquez, who had very little relationship with Valdez, viewed this as unacceptable. She instead threw her support behind Brooklyn Borough President Antonio Reynoso, an anti-machine progressive who had been one of her longtime protégés.

Two other candidates, New York City Councillor Julie Won and public defender Vichal Kumar, also made the primary ballot for the election, but were considered to have no chance of winning. While Valdez and Reynoso were ideologically similar, with both wanting to abolish the Immigrations and Customs Enforcement agency and denouncing the Gaza genocide, their contest quickly become a proxy conflict between the NYC-DSA and the Working Families Party (WFP), which backed Reynoso. Michael Lange opined that both organisations were fighting over which would have the leading role in New York City's progressive left, with the insurgent NYC-DSA seeking to supplant the more traditional WFP.

==== Nominee ====
- Claire Valdez, state assemblymember from the 37th district (2025–present)

==== Eliminated in primary ====
- Vichal Kumar, public defender
- Antonio Reynoso, Brooklyn borough president (2022–present)
- Julie Won, New York City councilmember from the 26th district (2022–present)

==== Disqualified ====
- Steven Carbajal, location manager
- Sydney Martinez, advocate
- Paperboy Prince, artist, perennial candidate, and candidate for this district in 2020 and 2022

==== Withdrawn ====
- Edwin Osorio, president of AFGE Local 3369
- Melvin Rivera, activist and tenant organizer (running as a Republican)

==== Declined ====
- Alexa Avilés, New York City councilmember from the 38th district (2022–present)
- Tiffany Cabán, New York City councilmember from the 22nd district (2021–present) and candidate for Queens District Attorney in 2019
- Emily Gallagher, state assemblymember from the 50th district (2021–present)
- Jennifer Gutiérrez, New York City councilmember from the 34th district (2022–present) (endorsed Reynoso)
- Sandy Nurse, New York City councilmember from the 37th district (2022–present) (endorsed Reynoso)
- Lincoln Restler, New York City councilmember from the 33rd district (2022–present) (endorsed Reynoso)
- Julia Salazar, state senator from the 18th district (2019–present) (running for re-election)
- Nydia Velázquez, incumbent U.S. representative (endorsed Reynoso)

==== Endorsements ====
Antonio Reynoso

U.S. representatives

- Jerry Nadler, NY-12 (1992–present)
- Pat Ryan, NY-18 (2022–present)
- Nydia Velázquez, NY-07 (1993–present)

Statewide officials

- Letitia James, attorney general of New York (2019–present)

Local officials

- Jennifer Gutiérrez, New York City councilmember from the 34th district (2022–present)
- Crystal Hudson, New York City councilmember from the 35th district (2022–present)
- Shekar Krishnan, New York City councilmember from the 25th district (2022–present)
- Sandy Nurse, New York City councilmember from the 37th district (2022–present)
- Lincoln Restler, New York City councilmember from the 33rd district (2022–present)
- Donovan Richards, borough president of Queens (2020–present)
- Jumaane Williams, public advocate of New York City (2019–present)

Labor unions

- 1199SEIU United Healthcare Workers East
- Communication Workers of America District 1
- Council of School Supervisors & Administrators
- District Council 37
- Hotel and Gaming Trades Council
- New York City Central Labor Council
- New York State AFL-CIO
- New York State Nurses Association
- New York State United Teachers
- Retail, Wholesale and Department Store Union
- SEIU 32BJ
- UNITE HERE Local 100

Organizations

- Citizen Action New York
- Make the Road Action
- New York Communities for Change
- Stonewall Democratic Club of New York

Political parties

- Queens County Democratic Party
- Working Families Party
Claire Valdez

U.S. senators

- Bernie Sanders, Vermont (2007–present) (Independent)

U.S. representatives

- Ro Khanna, CA-17 (2017–present)

State legislators

- Jabari Brisport, state senator from the 25th district (2021–present)
- Phara Souffrant Forrest, state assemblymember from the 57th district (2021–present)
- Emily Gallagher, state assemblymember from the 50th district (2021–present)
- Michael Gianaris, state senator from the 12th district (2011–present)
- Kristen Gonzalez, state senator from the 59th district (2023–present)
- Marcela Mitaynes, state assemblymember from the 51st district (2021–present)
- Diana Moreno, state assemblymember from the 36th district (2026–present)
- Chris Rabb, state representative from Pennsylvania's 200th district (2017–present) and 2026 Democratic nominee for PA-3
- Sarahana Shrestha, state assemblymember from the 103rd district (2023–present)

Local officials

- Zohran Mamdani, mayor of New York City (2026–present)
- Chi Ossé, New York City councilmember from the 36th district (2022–present)
- Shahana Hanif, New York City councilmember from the 39th district (2022–present)

Party officials

- Marti Gould Cummings, New York Democratic State Committee member

Individuals

- Darializa Avila Chevalier, community organizer and 2026 candidate for NY-13
- Shawn Fain, president of United Auto Workers (2023–present)
- Mahmoud Khalil, activist
- Sara Nelson, president of the Association of Flight Attendants
- Cynthia Nixon, actress and activist, candidate for governor of New York in 2018
- Zephyr Teachout, attorney and political advocate

Labor unions

- Association of Flight Attendants
- International Federation of Professional and Technical Engineers
- United Auto Workers

Organizations

- American Priorities
- Christopher Street Project
- DRUM Beats
- Jewish Voice for Peace
- Justice Democrats
- Leaders We Deserve
- A New Policy PAC
- New York City Democratic Socialists of America
- Our Revolution
- PAL PAC
- Progressive Change Campaign Committee
- Progressive Democrats of America
- Sunrise Movement
- Track AIPAC
- Track Oil PACs
Julie Won

U.S. senators

- Andy Kim, New Jersey (2024–present)

U.S representatives

- Dave Min, CA-47 (2025–present)
- Marilyn Strickland, WA-10 (2021–present)
- Jill Tokuda, HI-02 (2023–present)
- Derek Tran, CA-45 (2025–present)

State legislators

- Ron Kim, state assemblymember from the 40th district (2013–present)
- John Liu, state senator from the 16th district (2019–present)

Local officials

- Shanel Thomas-Henry, New York City councilmember from the 21st district (2026–present)

Organizations

- ASPIRE PAC
- Jim Owles Liberal Democratic Club
- Vote Run Lead
Edwin Osorio (withdrawn)

Labor unions

- American Federation of Government Employees (candidate's employer)
Julia Salazar (declined)

State legislators

- James Skoufis, state senator from the 42nd district (2019–present)

==== Fundraising ====
Campaign finance reports as of June 3, 2026
Candidate	Raised	Spent	Cash on hand
Vichal Kumar	$136,840	$121,431	$15,409
Antonio Reynoso (D)	$882,912	$571,380	$311,532
Claire Valdez (D)	$1,346,740	$928,623.	$418,117
Julie Won (D)	$857,883	$537,869	$320,014
Source: Federal Election Commission

==== Polling ====
Poll source	Date(s) administered	Sample size	Margin of error	Vichal Kumar	Antonio Reynoso	Julie Won	Claire Valdez	Undecided
Emerson College (Note: Poll sponsored by WPIX)	May 16–17, 2026	350 (LV)	± 5.2%	1%	21%	13%	23%	43%
Data for Progress (D) (Note: Poll sponsored by Justice Democrats, who have endorsed Valdez's campaign)	January 15–19, 2026	366 (LV)	± 5.0%	—	28%	—	24%	46%

==== Debates ====
2026 New York's 7th congressional district Democratic primary debates
No.	Date	Host	Moderator	Link	Democratic	Democratic	Democratic	Democratic
Key: P Participant A Absent N Not invited I Invited W Withdrawn								
Key: P Participant A Absent N Not invited I Invited W Withdrawn					Claire Valdez	Antonio Reynoso	Julie Won	Vichal Kumar
1	Jun. 3, 2026	NY1	Errol Louis; Courtney Gross	YouTube	P	P	P	N
2	Jun. 10, 2026	PIX11	Dan Mannarino	YouTube	P	P	P	N

==== Results ====
Valdez defeated Reynoso by a margin that was a surprise to observers such as Michael Lange, the state assemblywoman winning by over 20 percentage points. Valdez won throughout the district, but her strongest areas were in Queens, especially Ridgewood, and the Brooklyn neighborhoods of East Williamsburg and Bushwick. Reynoso's only strong performances were in the predominantly Latino neighborhood of Cypress Hills and among Satmar voters in South Williamsburg. Such was the scale of Valdez's victory that she even won the neighborhood of Los Sures, which had been Reynoso's place of birth and longtime stronghold.

Results by precinct Valdez: 30–40%; 40–50%; 50–60%; 60–70%; 70–80%; 80–90%; 90–100%; Reynoso: 30–40%; 40–50%; 50–60%; 60–70%; 70–80%; 80–90%; 90–100%; Won: 30–40%; 40–50%; Tie: 30–40%; 40–50%

Democratic primary results
Party	Candidate	Votes	%
Democratic	Claire Valdez	39,626	56.2
Democratic	Antonio Reynoso	25,127	35.6
Democratic	Julie Won	4,438	6.3
Democratic	Vichal Kumar	1,187	1.7
Write-in		110	0.2
Total votes		70,488	100.0

=== Republican primary ===
==== Candidates ====
- Melvin Rivera, activist and tenant organizer

=== Independents ===
==== Declared ====
- Priscilla Ghaznavi, designer and artist

=== General election ===
==== Predictions ====
Source	Ranking	As of
Decision Desk HQ	Safe D	July 14, 2026
The Cook Political Report	Solid D	February 6, 2025
Inside Elections	Solid D	March 7, 2025
Sabato's Crystal Ball	Safe D	September 18, 2025

==== Post-primary endorsements ====
Claire Valdez (D)

U.S. representatives

- Greg Casar, TX-35 (2023–present) and chair of the Congressional Progressive Caucus
- Maxwell Frost, FL-10 (2023–present)
- Pramila Jayapal, WA-7 (2017–present)

Labor unions

- Actors' Equity Association
- American Association of University Professors

Organizations

- Congressional Progressive Caucus
- End Citizens United

Political parties

- Working Families Party

==== Fundraising ====
Campaign finance reports as of September 30, 2026
Candidate	Raised	Spent	Cash on hand
Claire Valdez (D)	$1,893,757	$1,754,341	$139,416
Source: Federal Election Commission

==== Results ====
2026 New York's 7th congressional district election
Party	Candidate	Votes	%	±%
Democratic	Claire Valdez			
Working Families	Claire Valdez			
Total	Claire Valdez			
Republican	Melvin Rivera			
Conservative	Melvin Rivera			
Total	Melvin Rivera			
Our Future	Priscilla Ghaznavi			
Total votes				

== District 8 ==
2026 New York's 8th congressional district election
- Reporting: 87% as of Nov 5 at 4:32 PM EST
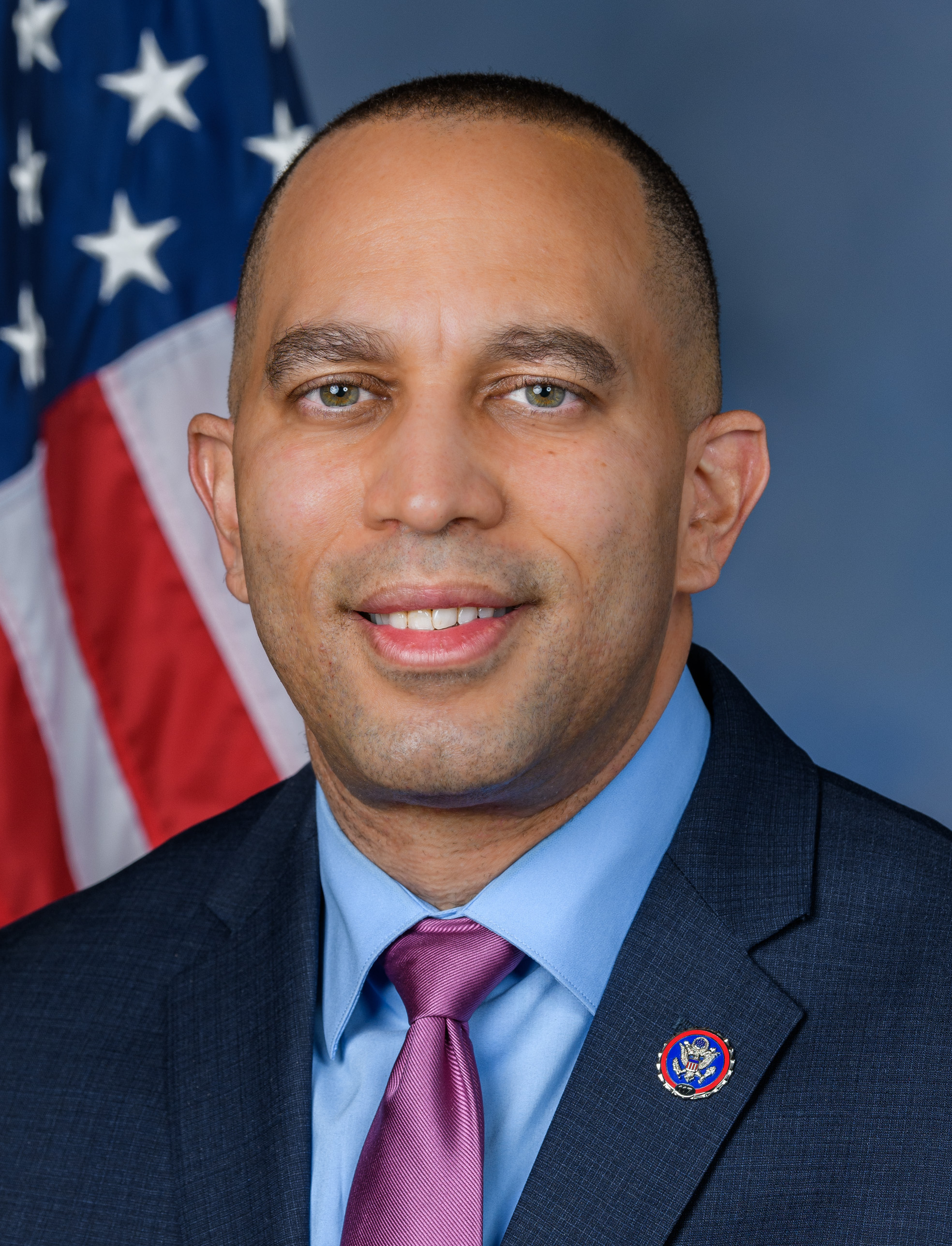

Nominee	Hakeem Jeffries	Lewis Mizrahi
Party	Democratic	Republican
Alliance		Conservative
Popular vote	128,197	31,969
Percentage	78.9%	19.7%
- County results Jeffries: 70–80%
U.S. Representative before election
Hakeem Jeffries
Democratic
Elected U.S. Representative
Hakeem Jeffries
Democratic

The 8th district is based in Southern and Eastern Brooklyn, including the neighborhoods of Bed-Stuy, Brownsville, East New York, Canarsie, Bergen Beach, Sheepshead Bay, Gravesend, and Coney Island. This district is currently represented by Democrat Hakeem Jeffries, the minority leader in the House, who was re-elected with 75.4% of the vote in 2024.

=== Democratic primary ===
Incumbent Jeffries had represented the 8th district since 2013, and had been elected leader of the House Democratic Caucus in 2022 following the retirement of Nancy Pelosi. Since then he had served as House minority leader in the face of a Republican-controlled House of Representatives, becoming along with his Senate counterpart Chuck Schumer one of the most high-profile Democrats during the Second Trump administration. Jeffries had, however, faced criticism, especially from more progressive Democrats, for the perception that he was a stodgy and awkward opposition figure, unable to adequately oppose congressional Republicans and President Trump.

Seeking to exploit this perceived vulnerability was New York City Councilor Chi Ossé, the youngest member of the Council, who had gained a profile after passing prominent tenant rights legislation. Ossé represented Bedford-Stuyvesant on the Council, an area which was young, gentrifying and had shown an appetite for insurgent left-wing politics. A member of the Democratic Socialists of America (DSA), Ossé sought to capitalise on the group's recent success in the 2025 New York mayoral election and mobilise them for a primary campaign against Jeffries.

However, his campaign was considered to have almost no chance of succeeding. While Jeffries had faced left-wing criticism for his performance as House Democratic leader he had opposed all major Republican legislation passed during the 119th Congress, unlike his Senate counterpart Schumer, and had remained scandal-free. He maintained a very strong base of support in the mainly African-American neighbourhoods of Canarsie and East New York, which had consistently backed moderate candidates in Democratic primaries and which Ossé had not represented in elected office. Jeffries also had effectively unlimited resources and institutional support as the House Democratic leader, and left-wing groups were extremely reluctant to endorse against him out of fear of damaging their relationships with the wider Democratic Party. These skeptics included some of the most prominent DSA officials in New York City, such as mayor Zohran Mamdani and U.S. Representative Alexandria Ocasio-Cortez, who actively lobbied the group to not endorse Ossé.

On November 22, 2025, the New York City branch of the DSA voted against endorsing Ossé's campaign, effectively leaving him without the support to continue running. Ossé ended his campaign two weeks later, all but ensuring that Jeffries would win another term in office.

==== Nominee ====
- Hakeem Jeffries, incumbent U.S. representative and House minority leader

==== Disqualified ====
- Vance Bostic, hospitality manager

===== Withdrawn =====
- Chi Ossé, New York City councilmember from the 36th district (2022–present)

===== Declined =====
- Jabari Brisport, New York state senator from the 25th district (2021–present)

==== Endorsements ====
Hakeem Jeffries

Labor unions

- Association of Flight Attendants
- Communication Workers of America District 1
- District Council 37
- New York State United Teachers
- NYC District Council of Carpenters

Organizations

- AIPAC
- J Street PAC
- Joint Action Committee for Political Affairs
- League of Conservation Voters Action Fund
- Natural Resources Defense Council
- Planned Parenthood Action Fund
- Population Connection
- Reproductive Freedom for All
- Stonewall Democratic Club of New York

==== Fundraising ====
Italics indicate a withdrawn candidate.

Campaign finance reports as of June 3, 2026
Candidate	Raised	Spent	Cash on hand
Hakeem Jeffries (D)	$13,992,480	$14,002,285	$4,944,760
Source: Federal Election Commission

==== Polling ====
Hypothetical polling

Poll source	Date(s) administered	Sample size	Margin of error	Hakeem Jeffries	Chi Ossé	Undecided
Z to A Research (D)	September 15–30, 2025	371 (RV)	± 5.0%	72%	21%	7%

=== Republican primary ===
==== Nominee ====
- Lewis Mizrahi, data analyst

=== Independent and third-party candidates ===
==== Withdrawn ====
- Soyoung Kim (Communist Party)

=== General election ===
==== Predictions ====
Source	Ranking	As of
Decision Desk HQ	Safe D	July 14, 2026
The Cook Political Report	Solid D	February 6, 2025
Inside Elections	Solid D	March 7, 2025
Sabato's Crystal Ball	Safe D	September 18, 2025

==== Fundraising ====
Campaign finance reports as of September 30, 2026
Candidate	Raised	Spent	Cash on hand
Hakeem Jeffries (D)	$17,526,400	$18,084,904	$4,396,060
Source: Federal Election Commission

==== Results ====
2026 New York's 8th congressional district election
Party	Candidate	Votes	%	±%
Democratic	Hakeem Jeffries (incumbent)			
Republican	Lewis Mizrahi			
Conservative	Lewis Mizrahi			
Total	Lewis Mizrahi			
Total votes				

== District 9 ==
2026 New York's 9th congressional district election
- Reporting: 87% as of Nov 5 at 4:32 PM EST
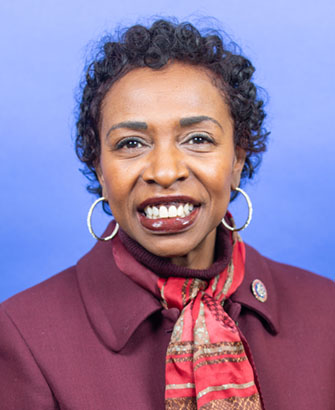

Nominee	Yvette Clarke	Joel Anabilah-Azumah
Party	Democratic	Republican
Alliance		Conservative
Popular vote	146,503	30,378
Percentage	82.1%	17.0%
- County results Clarke: 80–90%
U.S. Representative before election
Yvette Clarke
Democratic
Elected U.S. Representative
Yvette Clarke
Democratic

The 9th district is based in South and Central Brooklyn, including the neighborhoods of Prospect Heights, Crown Heights, Midwood, and Borough Park. The district is currently represented by Yvette Clarke, first elected in 2006, who was re-elected with 74.3% of the vote in 2024.

=== Democratic primary ===
==== Nominee ====
- Yvette Clarke, incumbent U.S. representative

==== Eliminated in primary ====
- Joshua Bristol, retail cashier and activist
- Michael Goldfarb, financial technology executive

==== Endorsements ====
Yvette Clarke

Labor unions

- Communication Workers of America District 1
- Council of School Supervisors & Administrators
- District Council 37
- New York City Central Labor Council
- New York State AFL-CIO
- New York State United Teachers
- NYC District Council of Carpenters

Organizations

- AIPAC
- J Street PAC
- Leading the Future
- Planned Parenthood Action Fund
- League of Conservation Voters Action Fund

==== Fundraising ====
Campaign finance reports as of June 3, 2026
Candidate	Raised	Spent	Cash on hand
Yvette Clarke (D)	$893,852	$940,582	$63,325
Michael Goldfarb (D)	$308,850	$255,452	$53,398
Source: Federal Election Commission

==== Results ====
Clarke comfortably prevailed in the primary, winning nearly 70% of the vote while the remainder was split evenly between Goldfarb and Bristol. Clarke won most precincts throughout the district, but her strongest area of support was in East Flatbush, where she lived. Goldfarb's strength was primarily concentrated among Hasidic Jews, allowing him to win numerous precincts in Borough Park and Midwood. Despite winning an almost identical number of votes to Goldfarb, Bristol's support was more diffused throughout the district, and he did not win any precincts. His strongest neighborhoods were Flatbush and Crown Heights.

Results by precinct Clarke: 30–40%; 40–50%; 50–60%; 60–70%; 70–80%; 80–90%; 90–100%; Goldfarb: 30–40%; 40–50%; 50–60%; 60–70%; 70–80%; 80–90%; Tie: 40–50%; 50%

Democratic primary results
Party	Candidate	Votes	%
Democratic	Yvette Clarke (incumbent)	30,723	68.4
Democratic	Michael Goldfarb	6,932	15.4
Democratic	Joshua Bristol	6,666	14.9
Write-in		564	1.3
Total votes		44,885	100.0

=== Republican primary ===
==== Nominee ====
- Joel Anabilah-Azumah, bus company owner and perennial candidate

==== Withdrawn ====
- Jean Depalis

==== Fundraising ====
Campaign finance reports as of April 15, 2026
Candidate	Raised	Spent	Cash on hand
Jean Depalis (R)	$12,404	$8,339	$1,055
Source: Federal Election Commission

=== General election ===
==== Predictions ====
Source	Ranking	As of
Decision Desk HQ	Safe D	July 14, 2026
The Cook Political Report	Solid D	February 6, 2025
Inside Elections	Solid D	March 7, 2025
Sabato's Crystal Ball	Safe D	September 18, 2025

==== Fundraising ====
Campaign finance reports as of September 3, 2026
Candidate	Raised	Spent	Cash on hand
Yvette Clarke (D)	$1,235,915	$1,237,000	$108,969
Source: Federal Election Commission

==== Results ====
2026 New York's 9th congressional district election
Party	Candidate	Votes	%	±%
Democratic	Yvette Clarke (incumbent)			
Republican	Joel Anabilah-Azumah			
Conservative	Joel Anabilah-Azumah			
Total	Joel Anabilah-Azumah			
Total votes				

== District 10 ==
2026 New York's 10th congressional district election
- Reporting: 88% as of Nov 5 at 4:32 PM EST
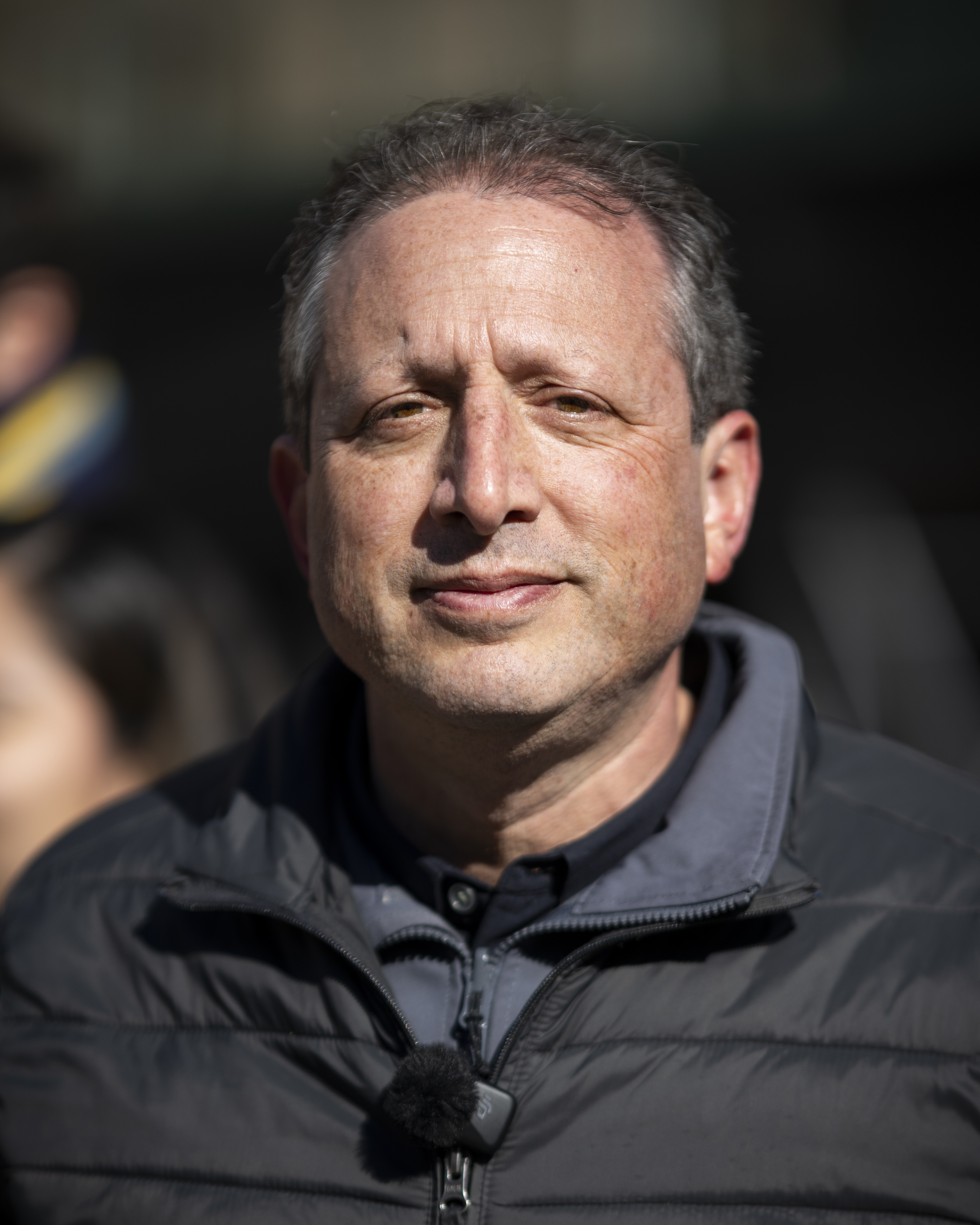

Nominee	Brad Lander	Jennifer Moore
Party	Democratic	Republican
Alliance	Working Families	Conservative
Popular vote	167,343	31,912
Percentage	83.2%	15.9%
- County results Lander: 80–90%
U.S. Representative before election
Dan Goldman
Democratic
Elected U.S. Representative
Brad Lander
Democratic

The 10th district is based in Lower Manhattan and Brooklyn, including the neighborhoods of Park Slope, Windsor Terrace, Brooklyn Gowanus, Brooklyn Heights, Cobble Hill, Red Hook, Sunset Park, Alphabet City, East Village, the Lower East Side, Greenwich Village, and the Financial District. The district is currently represented by Democrat Dan Goldman, first elected in 2022, who was re-elected with 82.3% of the vote in 2024. He faced a primary challenge by former New York City Comptroller Brad Lander, who positioned himself as the more progressive candidate. Lander won the primary on June 24, 2026.

=== Democratic primary ===
Goldman, the incumbent representative, was widely viewed as vulnerable to a primary challenge coming into the 2026 electoral cycle. While generally considered a progressive Democrat, Goldman had only narrowly won the Democratic primary in 2022 with 26% of the vote against a split field of more left-wing candidates, and his re-election campaign in 2024 was considered by analysts such as David Weigel to have been unimpressive, with the congressman winning only 66% of the primary vote against two low-profile challengers. Goldman's electoral struggles were attributed in part to his support for Israel, which had become extremely unpopular among left-wing voters as a result of the Gaza war.

These left-wing concerns were heightened following the 2025 New York City mayoral election. In the Democratic primary for that election, pro-Palestine democratic socialist Zohran Mamdani defeated moderate, pro-Israel Andrew Cuomo handily, in a performance which included defeating Cuomo by 23 percentage points in the 10th district. In the ensuing general election, where Cuomo ran as an independent, Goldman refused to endorse Mamdani due to the latter's pro-Palestine stance. Mamdani nevertheless again prevailed, winning the 10th district by 25 percentage points. Goldman's refusal to endorse Mamdani made him an immediate target of the progressive and socialist forces that had backed the incoming mayor, and also showcased the lack of influence he had over voters in his district.

Following Mamdani's victory, emboldened progressives began searching for a candidate to challenge Goldman. Brad Lander, the outgoing New York City comptroller who had finished third in the mayoral primary behind Mamdani and Cuomo and had cross-endorsed Mamdani in the latter stages of the campaign, was considered a strong candidate both because he had wide name recognition from his service as Comptroller and because despite finishing a distant third in the mayoral primary he had performed well in the 10th district itself, where he took 23% of the first-preference vote. However, Lander was not immediately able to unite the left behind him; NYC Councilor Alexa Avilés had also been considering a challenge to Goldman and had secured the endorsement of the New York City Democratic Socialists of America after forming an exploratory committee to do so. Mamdani, however, intervened to support Lander, making it known to Avilés that he would endorse the former comptroller if he ran.

Lander announced that he would be challenging Goldman on December 10, 2025, with Mamdani's backing. Perceiving no chance of winning without Mamdani's support, Avilés withdrew the next day. Lander immediately became the prohibitive frontrunner, with polls showing him beating Goldman by over 20 percentage points. Lander primarily attacked Goldman for not doing enough to oppose the actions of the Trump administration and Israeli government, and for not endorsing Mamdani's general election campaign.

==== Nominee ====
- Brad Lander, New York City comptroller (2022–2025) and candidate for mayor of New York City in 2025

==== Eliminated in primary ====
- Dan Goldman, incumbent U.S. representative

==== Disqualified ====
- Nickie Kane, activist and candidate for New York City's 39th City Council district in 2023 and 2025
- Savail Majid, attorney

==== Withdrew before primary ====
- Alexa Avilés, New York City councilmember from the 38th district (2022–present)

==== Declined ====
- Cameron Kasky, co-founder of Never Again MSD
- Yuh-Line Niou, former state assemblymember from the 65th district (2017–2022) and candidate for this district in 2022 (ran for state senate)
- Scott Stringer, former New York City comptroller (2014–2021) and candidate for mayor of New York City in 2021 and 2025

==== Endorsements ====
Dan Goldman

U.S. representatives

- Pete Aguilar, CA-33 (2015–present)
- Katherine Clark, House minority whip (2023–present) from MA-05 (2013–present)
- Hakeem Jeffries, House minority leader (2023–present) from NY-08 (2013–present)
- Nancy Pelosi, former speaker of the House (2007–2011, 2019–2023) from CA-11 (1987–present)

Statewide officials

- Kathy Hochul, governor of New York (2021–present)

State legislators

- Erik Bottcher, state senator from the 47th district (2026–present)
- Deborah Glick, state assemblymember from the 66th district (1991–present)
- Grace Lee, state assemblymember from the 65th district (2023–present)
- Tony Simone, state assemblymember from the 75th district (2023–present)

Local officials

- Adrienne Adams, former speaker of the New York City Council (2022–2025) from the 28th district (2017–2025)
- Brad Hoylman-Sigal, borough president of Manhattan (2026–present)
- Mark Levine, comptroller of New York City (2026–present)
- Gifford Miller, former speaker of the New York City Council (2002–2005) from the 5th district (1996–2005)
- Christine Quinn, former speaker of the New York City Council (2006–2013) from the 3rd district (1999–2013)
- Scott Stringer, former comptroller of New York City (2014–2021)

Labor unions

- Amalgamated Transit Union Local 1181
- Building & Construction Trades Council of Greater New York
- Civil Service Employees Association
- Council of School Supervisors and Administrators
- District Council 37
- IBEW Local 3
- LIUNA-NY
- National Association of Letter Carriers
- New York City Central Labor Council
- New York State AFL-CIO
- NYC District Council of Carpenters
- Teamsters Local 237
- United Federation of Teachers
- United Food and Commercial Workers Local 1500

Organizations

- AIPAC
- Animal Wellness Action
- ASPIRE PAC
- Brady Campaign
- Congressional Hispanic Caucus BOLD PAC
- Democratic Majority for Israel
- Equality PAC
- J Street PAC
- Jewish Democratic Council of America
- Joint Action Committee for Political Affairs
- Planned Parenthood Action Fund
- Reproductive Freedom for All
Brad Lander

U.S. senators

- Bernie Sanders, Vermont (2007–present) (Independent)
- Elizabeth Warren, Massachusetts (2013–present)

State legislators

- Jabari Brisport, state senator from the 25th district (2021–present)
- Robert Carroll, state assemblymember from the 44th district (2017–present)
- Emily Gallagher, state assemblymember from the 50th district (2021–present)
- Jessica González-Rojas, state assemblymember from the 34th district (2021–present)
- Andrew Gounardes, state senator from the 26th district (2019–present)
- Yuh-Line Niou, former state assemblymember from the 65th district (2017–2022)
- Julia Salazar, state senator from the 18th district (2019–present)

Local officials

- Alexa Avilés, New York City councilmember from the 38th district (2022–present)
- Justin Brannan, New York City councilmember from the 47th district (2018–2025)
- Jennifer Gutiérrez, New York City councilmember from the 34th district (2022–present)
- Shahana Hanif, New York City councilmember from the 39th district (2022–present)
- Crystal Hudson, New York City councilmember from the 35th district (2022–present)
- Zohran Mamdani, mayor of New York City (2026–present)
- Sandy Nurse, New York City councilmember from the 37th district (2022–present)
- Lincoln Restler, New York City councilmember from the 33rd district (2022–present)
- Jumaane Williams, public advocate of New York City (2019–present)

Individuals

- Ana María Archila, activist and former co-director of the New York Working Families Party
- Ben McKenzie, actor, author, and commentator
- Jennifer Welch, political commentator

Labor unions

- 32BJ SEIU
- Communication Workers of America District 1
- New York State Nurses Association
- Professional Staff Congress
- United Auto Workers Region 9A

Organizations

- American Priorities
- Christopher Street Project
- Citizen Action of New York
- College Democrats of America
- IfNotNow
- Indivisible
- The Jewish Vote
- Make the Road Action
- MoveOn
- Our Revolution
- Progressive Change Campaign Committee
- Progressive Democrats of America
- Progressive Victory
- Stonewall Democratic Club of New York

Political parties

- Working Families Party
Alexa Avilés (declined)

Organizations

- New York City Democratic Socialists of America

==== Fundraising ====
Italics indicate a withdrawn candidate.

Campaign finance reports as of June 3, 2026
Candidate	Raised	Spent	Cash on hand
Dan Goldman (D)	$7,809,407	$7,192,470	$1,549,186
Brad Lander (D)	$2,249,342	$1,756,066	$493,275
Source: Federal Election Commission

==== Polling ====
Poll source	Date(s) administered	Sample size	Margin of error	Dan Goldman	Brad Lander	Other	Undecided
Emerson College	May 16–17, 2026	450 (LV)	± 4.6%	23%	57%	–	20%
Schoen Cooperman Research (D) (Note: Poll sponsored by New Yorkers Fighting Back PAC, which supports Goldman)	May 1–4, 2026	465 (LV)	± 4.5%	42%	47%	3% (Note: Nickie Kane with 3%)	8%
Data For Progress (D) (Note: Poll sponsored by Demand Progress)	September 2–8, 2025	553 (LV)	± 4.0%	33%	52%	–	15%

Hypothetical polling

Dan Goldman vs. Alexa Avilés

Poll source	Date(s) administered	Sample size	Margin of error	Dan Goldman	Alexa Avilés	Undecided
Stand Up Action, Inc	November 3–6, 2025	500 (LV)	–	45%	16%	39%

Dan Goldman vs. another Democratic candidate

Poll source	Date(s) administered	Sample size	Margin of error	Dan Goldman	Another Democratic candidate	Undecided
Data For Progress (D)	September 2–8, 2025	553 (LV)	± 4.0%	41%	32%	28%

==== Debates ====
2026 New York's 10th congressional district Democratic primary debates
No.	Date	Host	Moderator	Link	Democratic	Democratic
Key: P Participant A Absent N Not invited I Invited W Withdrawn						
Key: P Participant A Absent N Not invited I Invited W Withdrawn					Dan Goldman	Brad Lander
1	Jun. 1, 2026	NY1	Courtney Gross; Errol Louis	YouTube	P	P
2	Jun. 15, 2026	PIX11	Dan Mannarino	YouTube	P	P

==== Results ====
In line with polling, Lander easily defeated Goldman by a margin of over 30 percentage points. His victory was called by media outlets only five minutes after polling stations had closed. Lander easily won the neighborhoods of Brownstone Brooklyn that had been his longtime base, and also defeated Goldman in Lower Manhattan, which had been the incumbent's base in the 2022 primary. Goldman's only areas of strength were the Haredi enclave of Borough Park and a few richer areas in Lower Manhattan such as Battery Park City, as well as the working-class Two Bridges.

Results by county Lander: 50–60%; 70–80%

Results by precinct Lander: 50–60%; 60–70%; 70–80%; 80–90%; 90–100%; 100%; Goldman: 50–60%; 60–70%; 70–80%; 80–90%; 90–100%; 100%

Democratic primary results
Party	Candidate	Votes	%
Democratic	Brad Lander	58,047	66.0
Democratic	Dan Goldman (incumbent)	29,781	33.8
Write-in		165	0.2
Total votes		87,993	100.0

=== Republican primary ===
==== Nominee ====
- Jennifer Moore, activist

=== General election ===
==== Predictions ====
Source	Ranking	As of
Decision Desk HQ	Safe D	July 14, 2026
The Cook Political Report	Solid D	February 6, 2025
Inside Elections	Solid D	March 7, 2025
Sabato's Crystal Ball	Safe D	September 18, 2025

==== Post-primary endorsements ====
Brad Lander (D)

U.S. representatives

- Greg Casar, TX-35 (2023–present) and chair of the Congressional Progressive Caucus
- Maxwell Frost, FL-10 (2023–present)
- Pramila Jayapal, WA-7 (2017–present)

Labor unions

- Actors' Equity Association
- American Association of University Professors
- Association of Flight Attendants
- Local 802 American Federation of Musicians

Organizations

- Congressional Progressive Caucus
- Giffords
- J Street
- League of Conservation Voters Action Fund

==== Fundraising ====
Campaign finance reports as of September 30, 2026
Candidate	Raised	Spent	Cash on hand
Brad Lander (D)	$2,711,795	$2,601,791	$110,005
Jennifer Moore (R)	$2,693	$1,168	$1,526
Source: Federal Election Commission

==== Results ====
2026 New York's 10th congressional district election
Party	Candidate	Votes	%	±%
Democratic	Brad Lander			
Working Families	Brad Lander			
Total	Brad Lander			
Republican	Jennifer Moore			
Conservative	Jennifer Moore			
Total	Jennifer Moore			
Total votes				

== District 11 ==
2026 New York's 11th congressional district election
- Reporting: 91% as of Nov 5 at 4:32 PM EST
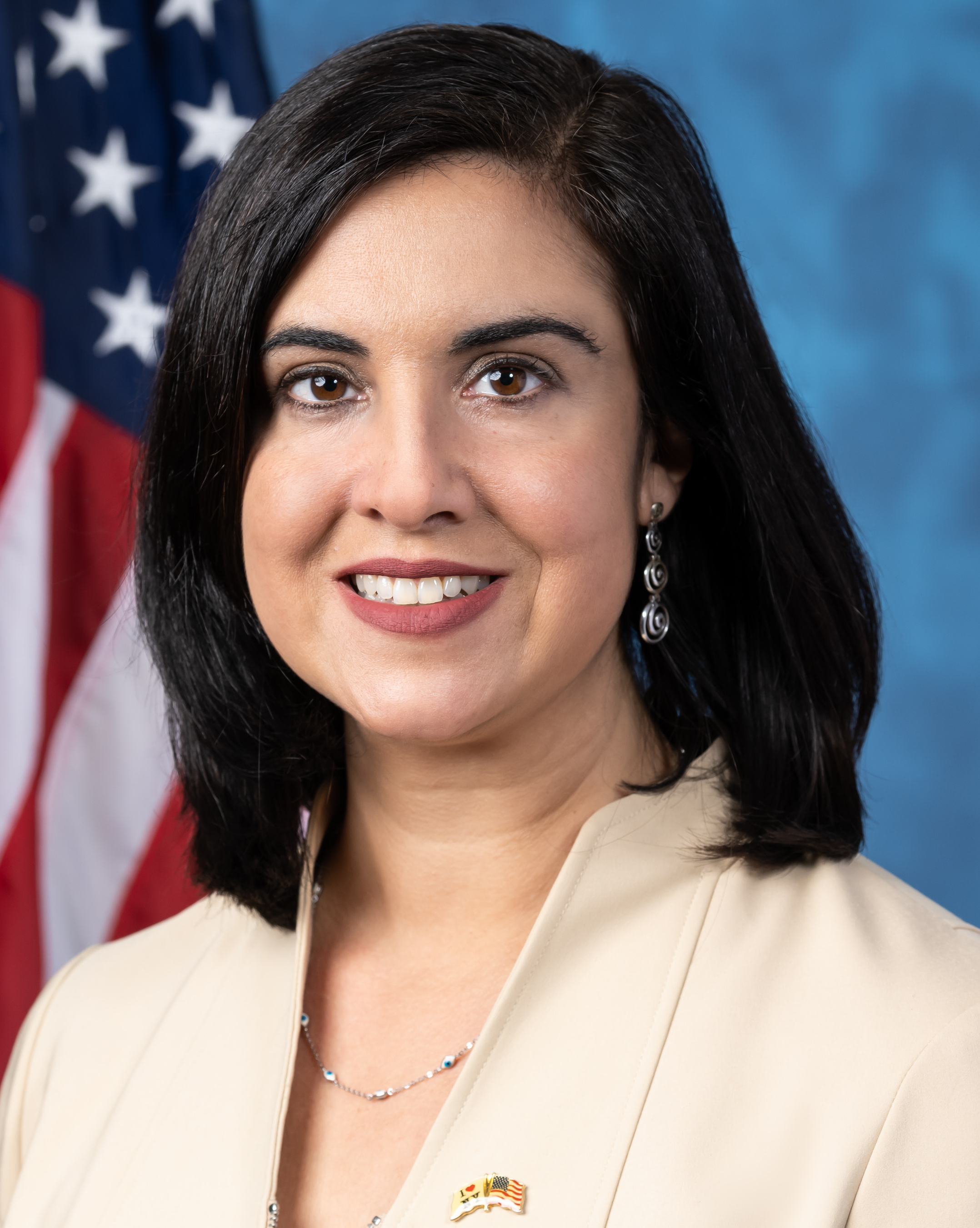

Nominee	Nicole Malliotakis	Michael DeCillis
Party	Republican	Democratic
Alliance	Conservative
Popular vote	101,719	79,370
Percentage	56.1%	43.8%
- County results Malliotakis: 50–60% DeCillis: 50–60%
U.S. Representative before election
Nicole Malliotakis
Republican
Elected U.S. Representative
Nicole Malliotakis
Republican

The 11th district includes all of Staten Island as well as the Brooklyn neighborhoods of Bay Ridge, Fort Hamilton, Dyker Heights, Bath Beach, and Bensonhurst. The incumbent is Republican Nicole Malliotakis, who was re-elected with 64.1% of the vote in 2024.

A decision by a judge on New York's trial court to declare the district's lines unconstitutional was upheld by the intermediate appeals court in February 2026.

On March 2, 2026, the Supreme Court of the United States issued a stay blocking implementation of the lower court ruling pending further litigation.

=== Republican primary ===
==== Nominee ====
- Nicole Malliotakis, incumbent U.S. representative

==== Endorsements ====
Nicole Malliotakis

Executive branch officials

- Donald Trump, president of the United States (2017–2021, 2025–present)

Labor unions

- Detectives' Endowment Association

Organizations

- Log Cabin Republicans

Political parties

- Staten Island Republican Party

==== Fundraising ====
Campaign finance reports as of June 3, 2026
Candidate	Raised	Spent	Cash on hand
Nicole Malliotakis (R)	$2,574,566	$1,272,731	$2,648,082
Source: Federal Election Commission

=== Democratic primary ===
==== Nominee ====
- Michael DeCillis, retired police officer and candidate for this district in 2018 and 2022

==== Withdrawn ====
- Allison Ziogas, electrician and labor organizer (remained on ballot)

==== Disqualified ====
- Troy McGhie, educator
- Umar Usman, former assistant to Brooklyn Borough President Antonio Reynoso

==== Endorsements ====
Michael DeCillis

Organizations

- Jim Owles Liberal Democratic Club
- Stonewall Democratic Club of New York
Allison Ziogas (withdrawn)

State legislators

- Charles Fall, state assemblymember from the 61st district (2019–present) and chair of the Staten Island Democratic Party (2025–present)

Individuals

- Morris Katz, political strategist

Party chapters

- Staten Island Democratic Party

Labor unions

- NYC District Council of Carpenters

==== Fundraising ====
Italics indicate a withdrawn candidate.

Campaign finance reports as of June 3, 2026
Candidate	Raised	Spent	Cash on hand
Michael DeCillis (D)	$45,867	$20,259	$25,607
Source: Federal Election Commission

==== Results ====
Results by precinct DeCillis: 40–50%; 50–60%; 60–70%; 70–80%; 80–90%; 90–100%; 100%; Ziogas: 40–50%; 50–60%; 60–70%; 80–90%; Tie: 40–50%; 50–60%

Democratic primary results
Party	Candidate	Votes	%
Democratic	Michael DeCillis	10,455	61.4
Democratic	Allison Ziogas (withdrawn)	6,309	37.1
Write-in		250	1.5
Total votes		17,014	100.0

=== General election ===
==== Predictions ====
Source	Ranking	As of
Decision Desk HQ	Safe R	July 14, 2026
The Cook Political Report	Solid R	February 6, 2025
Inside Elections	Solid R	March 7, 2025
Sabato's Crystal Ball	Safe R	September 18, 2025

==== Post-primary endorsements ====
Nicole Malliotakis (R)

Organizations

- U.S. Chamber of Commerce

==== Fundraising ====
Campaign finance reports as of September 30, 2026
Candidate	Raised	Spent	Cash on hand
Nicole Malliotakis (R)	$3,271,124	$1,768,350	$2,849,020
Michael DeCillis (D)	$155,510	$69,401	$86,109
Source: Federal Election Commission

==== Results ====
2026 New York's 11th congressional district election
Party	Candidate	Votes	%	±%
Republican	Nicole Malliotakis			
Conservative	Nicole Malliotakis			
Total	Nicole Malliotakis (incumbent)			
Democratic	Michael DeCillis			
Total votes				

== District 12 ==
2026 New York's 12th congressional district election
- Reporting: 86% as of Nov 5 at 4:32 PM EST
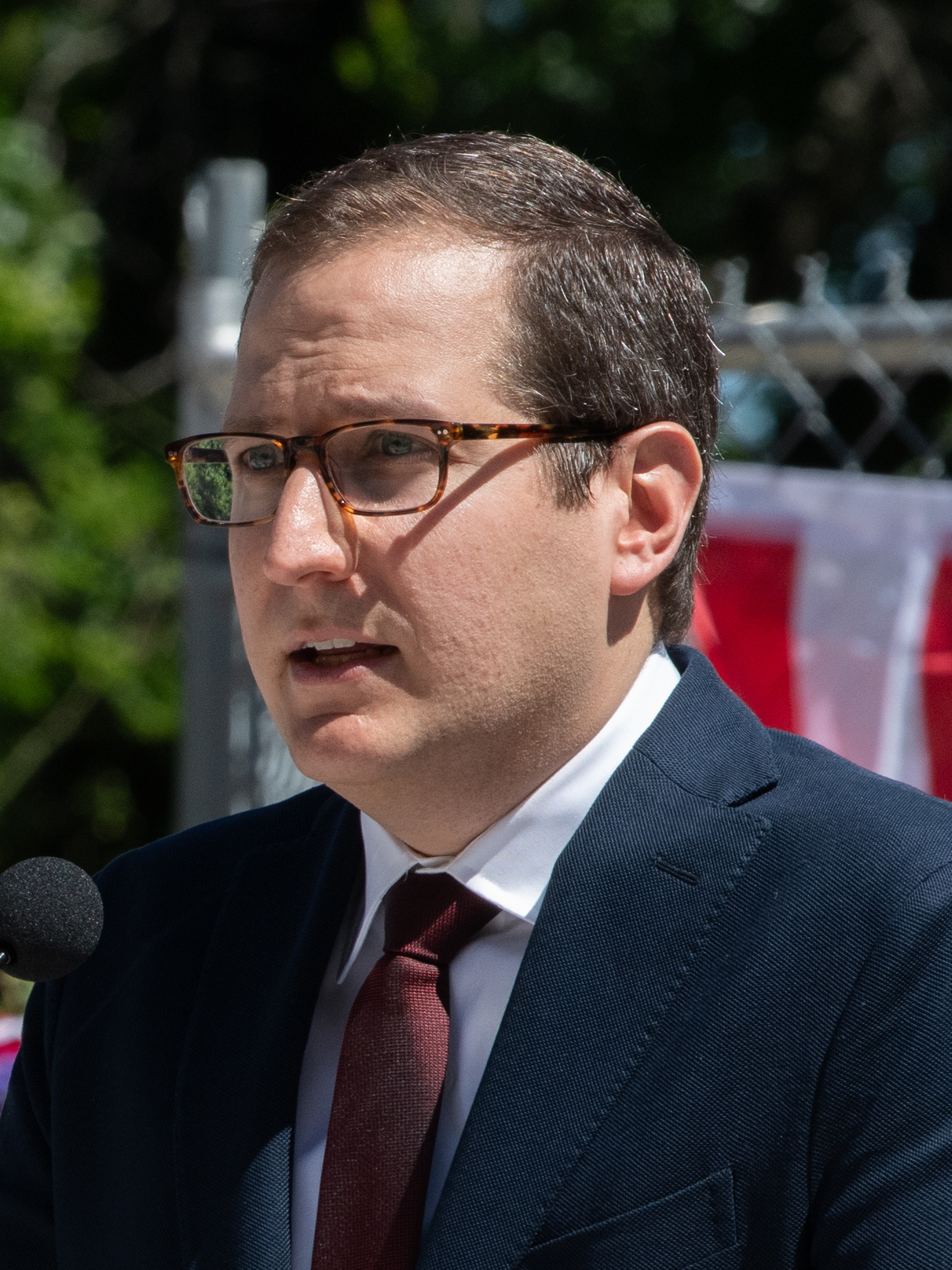

Nominee	Micah Lasher	Caroline Shinkle
Party	Democratic	Republican
Alliance		Conservative
Popular vote	193,614	50,212
Percentage	77.2%	20.0%
- County results Lasher: 70–80%
U.S. Representative before election
Jerry Nadler
Democratic
Elected U.S. Representative
Micah Lasher
Democratic

The 12th district is entirely based in Manhattan, comprising the Upper West Side, Upper East Side, Midtown, Hell's Kitchen, Chelsea, Murray Hill, and Gramercy. The incumbent is Democrat Jerry Nadler, who was re-elected with 80.6% of the vote in 2024. He is not running for re-election in 2026.

=== Democratic primary ===
Incumbent Congressman Jerry Nadler, who had served in the House of Representatives since 1992, announced his retirement on September 2, 2025. Nadler, who was already facing a primary challenge from non-profit executive Liam Elkind, declared that he had decided to retire after witnessing the collapse of the 2024 re-election campaign of Joe Biden due to concerns over the former president's health, and that he felt it was time for a younger politician to represent the 12th district.

An extremely large field of candidates almost immediately entered the race to replace Nadler. As the 12th district was safely Democratic, the open seat represented a rare opportunity for local politicians to gain a congressional seat they could not be easily unseated from. Several prominent candidates, such as Elkind, New York City Councilor Erik Bottcher, and left-wing activist Cameron Kasky, initially joined the race, but withdrew well before the primary, as mounting costs and outside spending caused it to become the second-most expensive House primary in history.

As the primary campaign drew on, four main candidates emerged for the seat. These were Upper West Side state assemblyman Micah Lasher, Upper East Side state assemblyman Alex Bores, lawyer George Conway, and Jack Schlossberg, a social media influencer and member of the Kennedy family. Lasher, who had the endorsement of the outgoing Nadler as well as Governor of New York Kathy Hochul and former mayor of New York City Michael Bloomberg, became widely regarded as the "establishment" candidate in the race despite only being a first-term assemblyman. Bores, who had co-authored the Responsible AI Safety and Education Act (RAISE), made strengthening the regulation of artificial intelligence a large focus of his campaign. Conway, formerly a high-profile Republican activist, based his campaign entirely around a promise to impeach President Donald Trump and his cabinet, promising to serve only a single term in office and focus solely on accomplishing this impeachment. Rounding out the four frontrunners, Schlossberg based his campaign around the argument that traditional politics were failing to mobilise young voters under the Democratic Party's banner, and that his large following on social media was evidence that he could inspire them to do so.

Naaman Zhou, writing in The New Yorker, noted that the ideological differences between the four candidates were minimal; while being interviewed by Zhou, Bores was unable to name a single policy disagreement between Lasher and himself. All four frontrunners supported the continuation of weapons sales to Israel, with only Schlossberg arguing that these sales should be limited to defensive weaponry. The progressive Working Families Party, which had been staunch supporters of Nadler throughout his career, elected not to endorse a candidate, while left-wing activist group Our Revolution endorsed Bores but was immediately disavowed by the assemblyman for their anti-Israel stance.

In the absence of ideological disagreements, the race soon devolved into a contest of personalities and geographical bases. Due to his passage of the RAISE Act, Bores became the target of significant spending from the artificial intelligence industry, with OpenAI spending millions of dollars to oppose his candidacy. Bores used this negative spending to argue that voting for his opponents was a vote for unregulated artificial intelligence. However, Bores was also supported with millions of dollars by the AI company Anthropic and by cryptocurrency billionaire Chris Larsen, which led to fierce attacks by Lasher and Schlossberg that if elected Bores would be a puppet of the cryptocurrency industry.

Polling in the race was scattershot, with different pollsters showing different candidates in the lead, but the joint attacks by Bores' opponents on his financial backers led City & State's Annie McDonough to argue that Bores was the frontrunner in the race. Lasher was also considered a likely victor, due to his inheritance of Nadler's Upper West Side base that had already proven victorious over Upper East Side Representative Carolyn Maloney in the 2022 primary cycle. Schlossberg's campaign was in contrast marred by disorganization, and critics frequently assailed him for the content of his social media posts, which included a large amount of irreverent material such as thirst traps that was viewed as unbecoming of a congressional candidate. Conway was considered to have the least chance of winning, due to his past as a Republican in the heavily-Democratic 12th.

==== Nominee ====
- Micah Lasher, state assemblymember from the 69th district (2025–present) and candidate for New York's 31st State Senate district in 2016

==== Eliminated in primary ====
- Alex Bores, state assemblymember from the 73rd district (2023–present)
- George Conway, lawyer and activist
- Chris Diep, tutor and software engineer
- Laura Dunn, attorney
- Jack Schlossberg, political commentator and grandson of President John F. Kennedy
- Nina Schwalbe, scientist
- Patrick Timmins, candidate for Manhattan district attorney in 2025

==== Withdrawn ====
- Erik Bottcher, former New York City Council member from the 3rd district (2022–2026) (ran for state senate, endorsed Lasher)
- Liam Elkind, non-profit CEO (endorsed Lasher)
- Jami Floyd, journalist and member of Manhattan Community Board 7 (endorsed Schlossberg)
- Cameron Kasky, co-founder of Never Again MSD and March for Our Lives organizer
- Alan Pardee, private equity firm executive
- Mathew Shurka, activist (endorsed Bores)

==== Declined ====
- Lindsey Boylan, former New York State deputy secretary for economic development, candidate for this district in 2020, and candidate for Manhattan borough president in 2021 (ran for city council)
- Chelsea Clinton, writer and daughter of former U.S. Senator Hillary Clinton and former president Bill Clinton
- Andrew Cuomo, former governor and candidate for mayor in 2025
- Dan Goldman, incumbent U.S. representative from the 10th district (running for re-election)
- Molly Jong-Fast, journalist and author
- Lina Khan, former chair of the Federal Trade Commission (2021–2025)
- Liz Krueger, state senator from the 28th district (2002–present) (running for re-election)
- Carolyn Maloney, former U.S. representative (1993–2023) (endorsed Bores)
- Julie Menin, New York City councilmember from the 5th district (2022–present) and speaker of the New York City Council (2026–present)
- Jerry Nadler, incumbent U.S. representative (endorsed Lasher)
- Scott Stringer, former New York City comptroller (2014–2021) and candidate for mayor in 2021 and 2025 (endorsed Lasher)

==== Endorsements ====
Alex Bores

U.S. representatives

- Steve Israel, former NY-03 (2001–2017)
- Carolyn Maloney, former NY-12 (1993–2023)
- Pat Ryan, NY-18 (2022–present)

State legislators

- 7 state assemblymembers (Note: Monique Chandler-Waterman, AD-58 (2022–present); Brian Cunningham, AD-43 (2022–present); Maritza Davila, AD-53 (2013–present); Eddie Gibbs, AD-68 (2022–present); Larinda Hooks, AD-35 (2025–present); Nikki Lucas, AD-60 (2022–present); Latrice Walker, AD-55 (2015–present))

Local officials

- Kevin Riley, New York City's CD-12 (2021–present)
- Julie Won, New York City's CD-26 (2022–present)

Individuals

- Kurt Andersen, writer and co-founder of Spy magazine
- Mathew Shurka, activist and former candidate for this seat
- Andrew Yang, entrepreneur, chair of the Forward Party (2022–present), candidate for president of the United States in 2020, candidate for mayor of New York City in 2021 (Forward)

Labor unions

- Communication Workers of America
- District Council 37
- New York City Central Labor Council
- New York State AFL-CIO
- New York State United Teachers
- Professional Staff Congress
- United Auto Workers Region 9A
- United Federation of Teachers

Organizations

- 314 Action
- Humane World Action Fund
- Our Revolution
- Stonewall Democratic Club of New York
Laura Dunn

Organizations

- National Organization for Women PAC
Micah Lasher

U.S. representatives

- Jerry Nadler, NY-12 (1992–present)
- Nydia Velázquez, NY-07 (1993–present)

Statewide officials

- Kathy Hochul, governor of New York (2021–present)
- David Paterson, former governor of New York (2008–2010)
- Eric Schneiderman, former attorney general of New York (2011–2018)

State legislators

- Erik Bottcher, SD-47 (2026–present) and former candidate for this seat
- Deborah Glick, AD-66 (1991–present)
- Linda Rosenthal, AD-67 (2006–present)

Local officials

- Shaun Abreu, New York City's CD-07 (2022–present)
- Michael Bloomberg, former mayor of New York City (2002–2013)
- Gale Brewer, New York City's CD-06 (2002–2013, 2022–present)
- Daniel Garodnick, chair of the New York City Planning Commission (2022–present)
- Brad Hoylman-Sigal, borough president of Manhattan (2026–present)
- Mark Levine, comptroller of New York City (2026–present)
- Ruth Messinger, former borough president of Manhattan (1990–1997)
- Christine Quinn, former speaker of the New York City Council (2006–2013) from the 3rd district (1999–2013)
- Scott Stringer, former comptroller of New York City (2014–2021)
- Carl Wilson, New York City's CD-03 (2026–present)

Individuals

- Liam Elkind, non-profit CEO and former candidate for this seat
- Bennie Safdie, filmmaker and actor
- Josh Safdie, filmmaker

Labor unions

- Actors’ Equity Association
- Council of School Supervisors & Administrators
Jack Schlossberg

Executive branch officials

- Caroline Kennedy, former ambassador to Australia (2022–2024) (candidate's mother)

U.S. representatives

- Nancy Pelosi, former speaker of the House (2007–2011, 2019–2023) from CA-11 (1987–present)

Labor unions

- Association of Flight Attendants

Individuals

- Jami Floyd, journalist, member of Manhattan Community Board 7, and former candidate for this seat
Nina Schwalbe

Individuals

- V, playwright and feminist activist
Erik Bottcher (withdrawn)

State legislators

- Evan Low, former California's AD-26 (2014–2024)

Organizations

- Equality PAC
- LGBTQ Victory Fund
Liam Elkind (withdrawn)

Local officials

- Daniel Doctoroff, former New York City deputy mayor (2002–2007)
- Rafael Espinal, executive director of Freelancers Union, former New York City's CD-37 (2014–2020)

Party officials

- Howard Dean, former chair of the Democratic National Committee (2005–2009)

Individuals

- Reid Hoffman, co-founder of LinkedIn
Cameron Kasky (withdrawn)

Organizations

- Track AIPAC
Declined to endorse

Political parties

- Working Families Party

Local officials

- Zohran Mamdani, mayor of New York City (2026–present)

==== Fundraising ====
Italics indicate a withdrawn candidate.

Campaign finance reports as of June 3, 2026
Candidate	Raised	Spent	Cash on hand
Alex Bores (D)	$3,651,284	$1,865,443	$1,785,840
George Conway (D)	$6,648,636	$5,734,432	$914,204
Christopher Diep (D)	$90,235	$89,065	$1,170
Laura Dunn (D)	$189,258	$157,318	$31,940
Micah Lasher (D)	$2,621,078	$1,558,633	$1,062,445
Jack Schlossberg (D)	$3,919,837	$2,657,145	$1,262,692
Nina Schwalbe (D)	$574,780	$457,827	$116,952
Patrick Timmins (D)	$28,871	$26,428	$2,443
Source: Federal Election Commission

==== Polling ====
Poll source	Date(s) administered	Sample size	Margin of error	Alex Bores	George Conway	Micah Lasher	Jack Schlossberg	Other	Undecided
Emerson College	May 16–17, 2026	425 (LV)	± 4.8%	20%	10%	22%	11%	5% (Note: Nina Schwalbe with 3%; "Other" with 2%)	32%
Tavern Research (D)	May 11–15, 2026	910 (LV)	± 4.1%	20%	9%	16%	17%	10% (Note: Laura Dunn with 5%; Nina Schwalbe and "Other" with 2%; Mathew Shurka with 1%; Christopher Diep and Patrick Timmins with 0%)	28%
GQR (D) (Note: Poll sponsored by Conway's campaign)	May 12–14, 2026	500 (LV)	± 4.4%	26%	17%	23%	14%	20%	
Hart Research (D) (Note: Poll sponsored by Bores's campaign)	May 6–9, 2026	400 (LV)	± 5.0%	21%	10%	20%	17%	4% (Note: Nina Schwalbe with 3%; "Other candidate" with 1%)	28%
Honan Strategy Group (D) (Note: Poll commissioned for the Grand Penn Community Alliance)	April 16–22, 2026	300 (LV)	± 5.6%	19%	9%	28%	20%	–	23%
Hart Research (D)	March 9–13, 2026	404 (LV)	± 5.0%	19%	10%	14%	22%	4% (Note: Nina Schwalbe with 4%)	31%
GQR (D)	February 25 – March 2, 2026	500 (LV)	± 4.4%	11%	16%	11%	25%	3% (Note: "Some other candidate" with 3%)	33%
Public Policy Polling (D) (Note: Poll sponsored by a pro-Bores group)	February 26–27, 2026	608 (LV)	–	20%	13%	19%	18%	–	30%
Schoen Cooperman Research (D) (Note: Poll sponsored by Leading the Future, which opposes Bores)	February 22–25, 2026	300 (LV)	± 5.7%	11%	13%	6%	23%	11% (Note: Laura Dunn with 3%; Jami Floyd, Alan Pardee, Nina Schwalbe, and Mathew Shurka with 2%)	36%
Schoen Cooperman Research (D)	February 4–9, 2026	300 (LV)	± 5.7%	9%	16%	8%	23%	11% (Note: Jami Floyd with 3%; Alan Pardee and Nina Schwalbe with 2%; Christopher Diep, Laura Dunn, Mathew Shurka, and "Someone else" with 1%)	33%

==== Debates ====
2026 New York's 12th congressional district Democratic primary debates
No.	Date	Host	Moderator	Link	Democratic	Democratic	Democratic	Democratic	Democratic
Key: P Participant A Absent N Not invited I Invited W Withdrawn									
Key: P Participant A Absent N Not invited I Invited W Withdrawn					Alex Bores	George Conway	Micah Lasher	Jack Schlossberg	Nina Schwalbe
1	Jun. 4, 2026	WPIX	Dan Mannarino	YouTube	P	P	P	P	N
2	Jun. 9, 2026	Baruch College; Gothamist; NY1; WNYC	Brigid Bergin; Brian Lehrer; Errol Louis	YouTube	P	P	P	P	P

==== Results ====
Lasher won the primary, defeating Bores narrowly. Lasher's primary source of strength was the Upper West Side, which he won comfortably, and he also performed surprisingly strongly on the Upper East Side, winning many precincts that were expected to go to Bores. Bores' strongest areas were the younger portions of the district, and he won both Kips Bay and Hudson Yards, alongside Midtown, but this was not enough to counter Lasher's unexpected strength on the Upper East Side.

Results by precinct Lasher: 30–40%; 40–50%; 50–60%; 60–70%; 100%; Bores: 20–30%; 30–40%; 40–50%; 50–60%; Schlossberg: 30–40%; 50–60%; Schwalbe: 100%; Tie: 30–40%

Democratic primary results
Party	Candidate	Votes	%
Democratic	Micah Lasher	41,940	38.9
Democratic	Alex Bores	37,637	34.9
Democratic	Jack Schlossberg	11,719	10.9
Democratic	Nina Schwalbe	7,819	7.2
Democratic	George Conway	6,588	6.1
Democratic	Laura Dunn	1,477	1.4
Democratic	Patrick Timmins	330	0.3
Democratic	Chris Diep	214	0.2
Write-in		166	0.2
Total votes		107,890	100.0

=== Republican primary ===
==== Nominee ====
- Caroline Shinkle, lawyer

==== Endorsements ====
Caroline Shinkle

Party officials

- Edward F. Cox, chair of the New York Republican Party

Organizations

- Log Cabin Republicans

==== Fundraising ====
Italics indicate a withdrawn candidate.

Campaign finance reports as of June 3, 2026
Candidate	Raised	Spent	Cash on hand
Caroline Shinkle (R)	$133,639	$58,915	$74,725
Source: Federal Election Commission

=== Independent and third-party candidates ===
==== Declared ====
- Wilneida Negron (Independent), political scientist
- Karen Ortiz (Independent), former Equal Employment Opportunity Commission administrative judge (2018–2025)

==== Withdrawn ====
- Robb Hur (unaffiliated)

==== Endorsements ====
Karen Ortiz

Organizations

- Track AIPAC

=== General election ===
==== Predictions ====
Source	Ranking	As of
Decision Desk HQ	Safe D	July 14, 2026
The Cook Political Report	Solid D	February 6, 2025
Inside Elections	Solid D	March 7, 2025
Sabato's Crystal Ball	Safe D	September 18, 2025

==== Post-primary endorsements ====
Micah Lasher (D)

U.S. representatives

- Greg Casar, TX-35 (2023–present) and chair of the Congressional Progressive Caucus
- Maxwell Frost, FL-10 (2023–present)
- Pramila Jayapal, WA-7 (2017–present)

Labor unions

- American Association of University Professors
- American Federation of Government Employees
- Local 802 American Federation of Musicians

Organizations

- Congressional Progressive Caucus
- End Citizens United
- Giffords
- J Street
Caroline Shinkle (R)

Organizations

- New York Young Republican Club

==== Fundraising ====
Campaign finance reports as of September 30, 2026
Candidate	Raised	Spent	Cash on hand
Micah Lasher (D)	$3,440,762	$3,162,669	$278,092
Caroline Shinkle (R)	$247,198	$113,033	$134,164
Source: Federal Election Commission

==== Results ====
2026 New York's 12th congressional district election
Party	Candidate	Votes	%	±%
Democratic	Micah Lasher			
Republican	Caroline Shinkle			
Conservative	Caroline Shinkle			
Total	Caroline Shinkle			
For All of Us	Wilneida Negron			
Karen Ortiz	Karen Ortiz			
Total votes				

== District 13 ==
2026 New York's 13th congressional district election
- Reporting: 92% as of Nov 19th at 7:58 PM EST
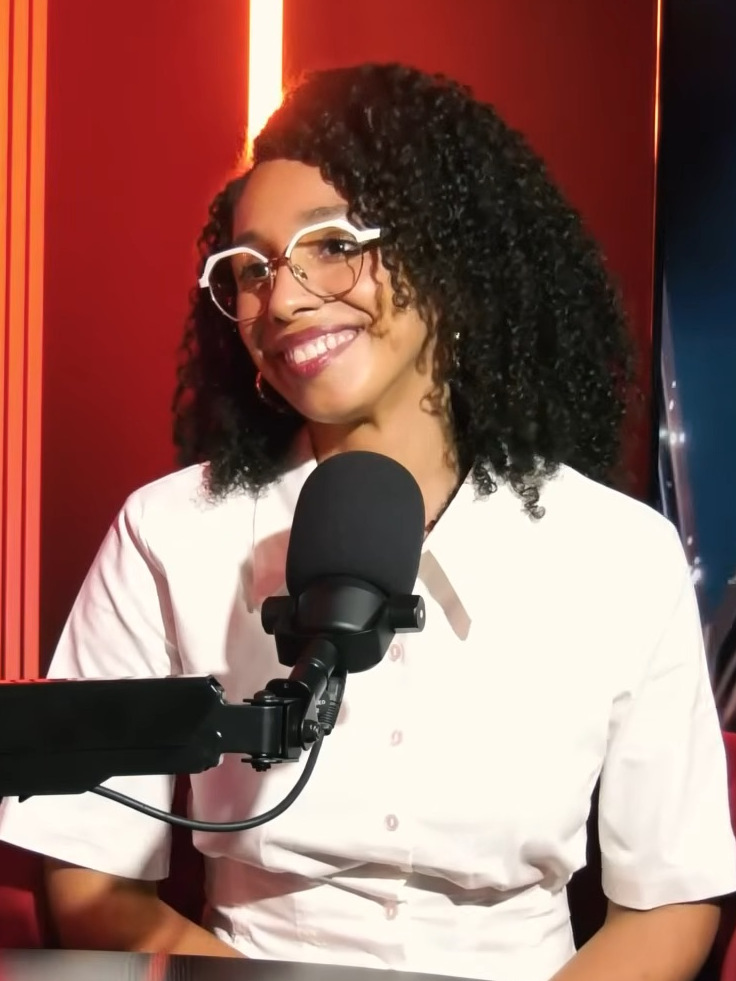

Nominee	Darializa Avila Chevalier	Jomo M. Williams
Party	Democratic	Republican
Alliance	Working Families
Popular vote	141,014	18,308
Percentage	87.5%	11.4%
- County results Avila Chevalier: 80–90%
U.S. Representative before election
Adriano Espaillat
Democratic
Elected U.S. Representative
Darializa Avila Chevalier
Democratic

The 13th district is based in Upper Manhattan and the Northwest Bronx, including the neighborhoods of Harlem, Morningside Heights, Spanish Harlem, Hamilton Heights, Washington Heights, Inwood, Marble Hill, Fordham, Kingsbridge, and Bedford Park. The incumbent was Democrat Adriano Espaillat, who was first elected in 2016, re-elected with 83.5% of the vote in 2024, and was defeated in the Democratic primary by Darializa Avila Chevalier. The primary received national attention as a fight between the Democratic Party's mainstream wing and the party's democratic socialist wing.

=== Democratic primary ===
==== Candidates ====
===== Nominee =====
- Darializa Avila Chevalier, graduate student and community organizer

===== Eliminated in primary =====
- Theo Chino-Tavarez, national secretary of the Social Democrats of America
- Adriano Espaillat, incumbent U.S. representative
- Oscar Romero, chief information officer of the New York City Civic Engagement Commission

===== Withdrawn =====
- Jaliel Amador, teacher (endorsed Espaillat)
- Michael Hano, pet food salesman & candidate for this district in 2022
- James Felton Keith, activist, non-profit executive and candidate for this district in 2020
- Matt Miller, activist
- Megan C. Rodriguez, former congressional staffer

==== Results ====
Avila Chevalier defeated Espaillat in the Democratic primary in an upset. The primary electorate was heavily stratified by age, with Avila Chevalier performing best among young voters. She won Hamilton Heights, Hudson Heights, northern Inwood and both Harlem and Spanish Harlem. Espaillat won the Bronx and the heavily-Dominican Washington Heights, along with Marble Hill.

Democratic primary results by county Avila Chevalier: 50–60%; Espaillat: 50–60%

Democratic primary results by precinct Avila Chevalier: 40–50%; 50–60%; 60–70%; 70–80%; Espaillat: 40–50%; 50–60%; 60–70%; 70–80%; 80–90%; 90–100%

Democratic primary results
Party	Candidate	Votes	%
Democratic	Darializa Avila Chevalier	36,292	49.5
Democratic	Adriano Espaillat (incumbent)	33,555	45.7
Democratic	Oscar Romero	2,631	3.6
Democratic	Theo Chino-Tavarez	623	0.8
Write-in		288	0.4
Total votes		73,389	100.0

=== Republican primary ===
==== Candidates ====
===== Nominee =====
- Jomo Williams, businessman and nominee for New York City's 7th City Council district in 2025

=== General election ===
==== Predictions ====
Source	Ranking	As of
Decision Desk HQ	Safe D	July 14, 2026
The Cook Political Report	Solid D	February 6, 2025
Inside Elections	Solid D	March 7, 2025
Sabato's Crystal Ball	Safe D	September 18, 2025

==== Post-primary endorsements ====
Darializa Avila Chevalier (D)

U.S. representatives

- Greg Casar, TX-35 (2023–present) and chair of the Congressional Progressive Caucus
- Maxwell Frost, FL-10 (2023–present)
- Pramila Jayapal, WA-7 (2017–present)

Labor unions

- Actors' Equity Association
- Local 802 American Federation of Musicians
- OPEIU Local 153

Organizations

- Congressional Progressive Caucus
- End Citizens United

Political parties

- Working Families Party

==== Fundraising ====
Campaign finance reports as of September 30, 2026
Candidate	Raised	Spent	Cash on hand
Darializa Avila Chevalier (D)	$1,563,645	$1,417,187	$46,457
Source: Federal Election Commission

==== Results ====
2026 New York's 13th congressional district election
Party	Candidate	Votes	%	±%
Democratic	Darializa Avila Chevalier			
Working Families	Darializa Avila Chevalier			
Total	Darializa Avila Chevalier			
Republican	Jomo Williams			
Total votes				

== District 14 ==
2026 New York's 14th congressional district election
- Reporting: 92% as of Nov 5 at 4:32 PM EST
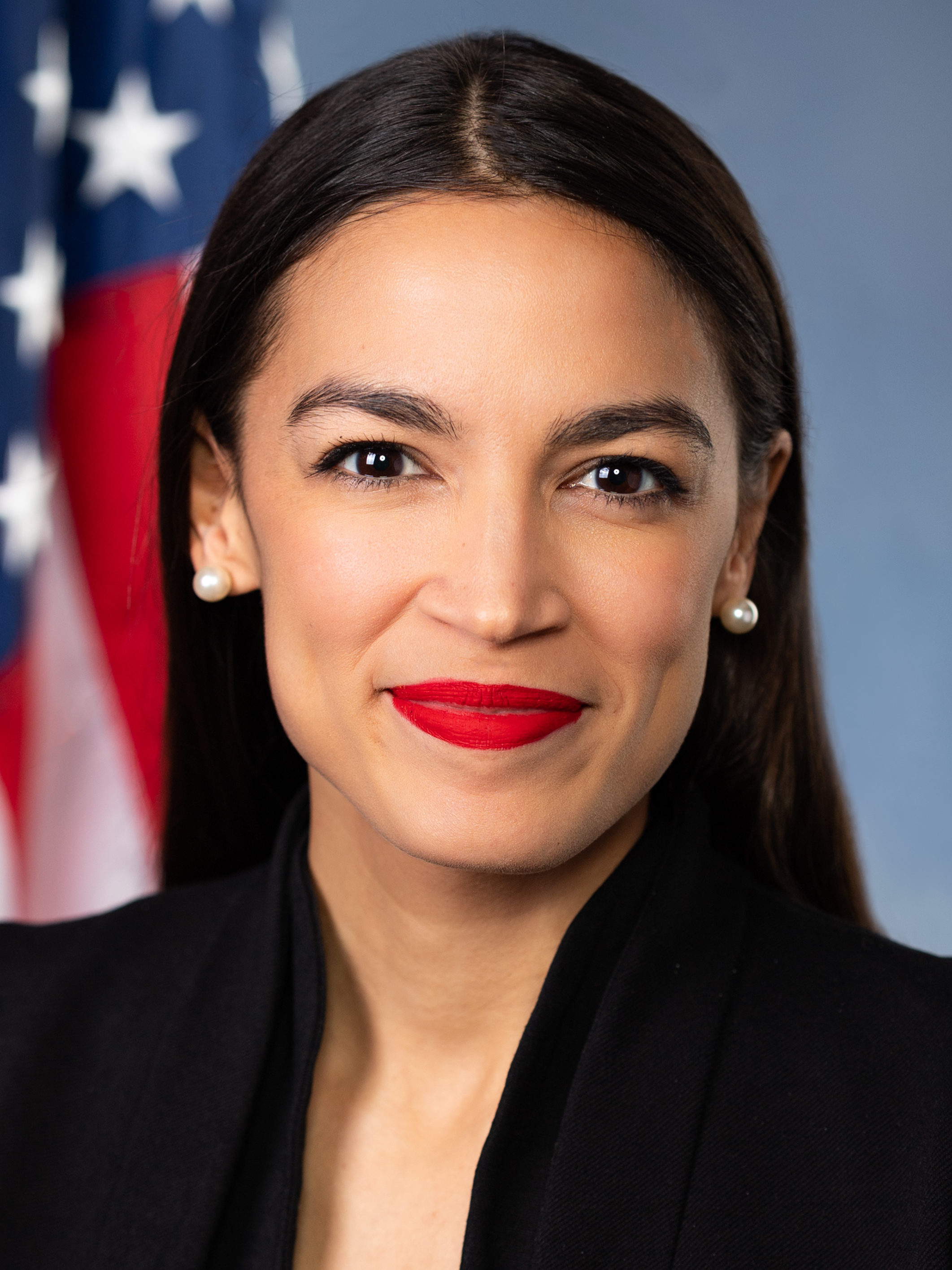

Nominee	Alexandria Ocasio-Cortez	Diamant Hysenaj
Party	Democratic	Republican
Alliance	Working Families	Conservative
Popular vote	107,129	29,505
Percentage	78.2%	21.5%
- County results Ocasio-Cortez: 70–80%
U.S. Representative before election
Alexandria Ocasio-Cortez
Democratic
Elected U.S. Representative
Alexandria Ocasio-Cortez
Democratic

The 14th district is based in North Queens and the East Bronx, including the neighborhoods of Corona, East Elmhurst, Astoria, College Point, Hunts Point, Castle Hill, Throggs Neck, Parkchester, Country Club, Co-Op City, and City Island. The district is currently represented by Alexandria Ocasio-Cortez, who was re-elected with 69.2% of the vote in 2024.

=== Democratic primary ===
==== Nominee ====
- Alexandria Ocasio-Cortez, incumbent U.S. representative

==== Eliminated in primary ====
- Marty Dolan, candidate for this district in 2024 and candidate for New York City Public Advocate in 2025
- Felipe Garcia, former business executive

==== Endorsements ====
Marty Dolan

Individuals

- Bryant McKinnie, former NFL offensive tackle
- Rahzel, beatboxer and rapper
Alexandria Ocasio-Cortez

Labor unions

- Association of Flight Attendants
- Communication Workers of America District 1
- Council of School Supervisors & Administrators
- District Council 37
- New York State Nurses Association
- New York State United Teachers
- NYC District Council of Carpenters
- United Auto Workers Region 9A

Organizations

- Citizen Action of New York
- The Jewish Vote
- Justice Democrats
- League of Conservation Voters Action Fund
- National Women's Political Caucus
- New York City Democratic Socialists of America
- Our Revolution
- Peace Action
- Planned Parenthood Action Fund
- Progressive Democrats of America
- Track AIPAC

==== Fundraising ====
Campaign finance reports as of June 3, 2026
Candidate	Raised	Spent	Cash on hand
Marty Dolan (D)	$70,953	$66,181	$4,771
Alexandria Ocasio-Cortez (D)	$31,095,335	$18,890,837	$15,939,145
Source: Federal Election Commission

==== Results ====
Results by precinct Ocasio-Cortez: 40–50%; 50–60%; 60–70%; 70–80%; 80–90%; 90–100%; Dolan: 50–60%; Garcia: 60–70%; 100%

Ocasio-Cortez won her primary easily, achieving 87% of the vote. This was the highest vote any incumbent in New York received in a contested primary during the 2026 cycle, and was the highest vote she had received in a primary since her election in 2018.

Democratic primary results
Party	Candidate	Votes	%
Democratic	Alexandria Ocasio-Cortez (incumbent)	31,202	86.9
Democratic	Felipe Garcia	2,429	6.8
Democratic	Marty Dolan	2,136	5.9
Write-in		147	0.4
Total votes		35,914	100.0

=== Republican primary ===
==== Nominee ====
- Diamant Hysenaj, real estate developer

==== Disqualified ====
- Aurelio Arcabascio, retired project manager and perennial candidate
- Tina Forte, social media influencer and nominee for this district in 2022 and 2024
- Ariel Rivera-Diaz, NYC Board of Elections worker and candidate for State Assembly in 2018

==== Fundraising ====
Campaign finance reports as of June 3, 2025
Candidate	Raised	Spent	Cash on hand
Diamant Hysenaj (R)	$319,496	$303,150	$16,345
Source: Federal Election Commission

==== Endorsements ====
Diamant Hysenaj

International politicians

- Përparim Rama, mayor of Pristina, Kosovo (Democratic League of Kosovo)

=== General election ===
==== Predictions ====
Source	Ranking	As of
Decision Desk HQ	Safe D	July 14, 2026
The Cook Political Report	Solid D	February 6, 2025
Inside Elections	Solid D	March 7, 2025
Sabato's Crystal Ball	Safe D	September 18, 2025

==== Fundraising ====
Campaign finance reports as of September 3, 2026
Candidate	Raised	Spent	Cash on hand
Alexandria Ocasio-Cortez (D)	$37,429,335	$23,783,780	$17,380,202
Diamant Hysenaj (R)	$407,061	$386,606	$20,455
Source: Federal Election Commission

==== Results ====
2026 New York's 14th congressional district election
Party	Candidate	Votes	%	±%
Democratic	Alexandria Ocasio-Cortez			
Working Families	Alexandria Ocasio-Cortez			
Total	Alexandria Ocasio-Cortez (incumbent)			
Republican	Diamant Hysenaj			
Conservative	Diamant Hysenaj			
Total	Diamant Hysenaj			
Total votes				

== District 15 ==
2026 New York's 15th congressional district election
- Reporting: 90% as of Nov 5 at 4:32 PM EST
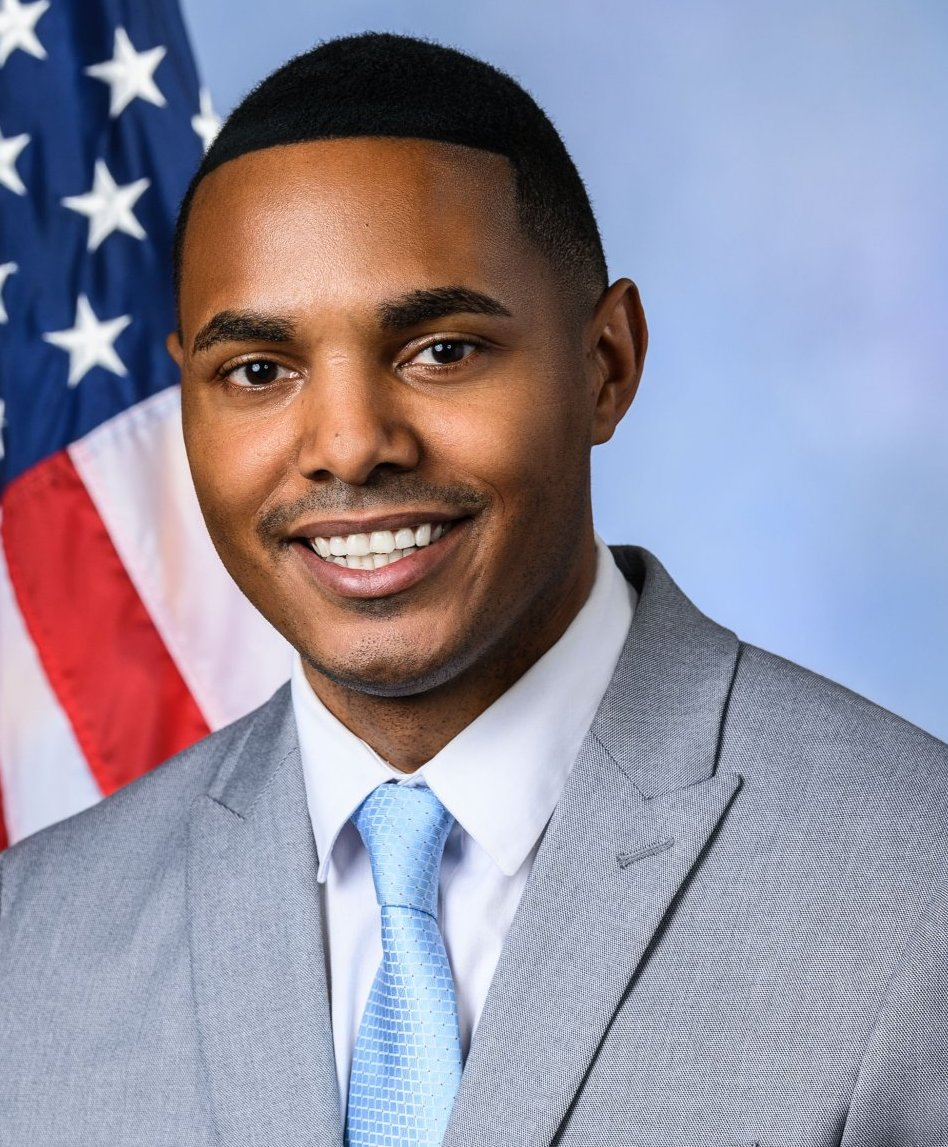

Nominee	Ritchie Torres	Stylo Sapaskis	Andre Easton
Party	Democratic	Republican	Socialism and Liberation
Popular vote	93,812	13,004	10,647
Percentage	76.8%	10.6%	8.7%
- County results Torres: 70–80%
U.S. Representative before election
Ritchie Torres
Democratic
Elected U.S. Representative
Ritchie Torres
Democratic

The 15th district is based in the West Bronx, including the neighborhoods of Mott Haven, Melrose, Morrisania, Highbridge, Tremont, West Farms, Belmont, Norwood, Woodlawn Heights, Riverdale, and Spuyten Duyvil. The district is currently represented by Democrat Ritchie Torres, first elected in 2020, who was re-elected with 76.5% of the vote in 2024. He is running for re-election.

=== Democratic primary ===
==== Nominee ====
- Ritchie Torres, incumbent U.S. representative

==== Eliminated in primary ====
- Michael Blake, former state assemblymember from the 79th district (2015–2021), former DNC vice chair (2017–2021), candidate for New York City public advocate in 2019, candidate for this district in 2020, and candidate for mayor of New York City in 2025
- Jose Vega, LaRouche Youth Movement activist and independent candidate for this seat in 2024 (ran in the general election as an Independent)

==== Withdrawn ====
- Dalourny Nemorin, member of Bronx Community Board 1
- Amanda Septimo, state assemblymember from the 84th district (2021–present) (running for re-election)

==== Declined ====
- Jamaal Bowman, former U.S. representative for the 16th district (2021–2025)

==== Endorsements ====
Michael Blake

Local officials

- Ras Baraka, mayor of Newark (2014–present)
- Bill de Blasio, former mayor of New York City (2014–2021)

Labor unions

- UNITE HERE Local 100

Organizations

- Citizen Action of New York
- College Democrats of America
- Jim Owles Liberal Democratic Club
- People for the American Way
- Progressive Victory
- Track AIPAC
Ritchie Torres

U.S. representatives

- Adriano Espaillat, NY-13 (2017–present)
- Hakeem Jeffries, House minority leader (2023–present) from NY-08 (2013–present)
- Gregory Meeks, NY-05 (1998–present)
- Nancy Pelosi, former speaker of the House (2007–2011, 2019–2023) from CA-11 (1987–present)
- Linda Sánchez, CA-38 (2003–present)
- Mark Takano, CA-39 (2013–present)

State legislators

- George Alvarez, state assemblymember from the 78th district (2023–present)
- Jamaal Bailey, state senator from the 36th district (2017–present) and chair of the Bronx Democratic Party (2020–present)
- Landon Dais, state assemblymember from the 77th district (2024–present)
- Jeffrey Dinowitz, state assemblymember from the 81st district (1994–present)
- Carl Heastie, speaker of the New York State Assembly (2015–present) from the 83rd district (2001–present)
- Chantel Jackson, state assemblymember from the 79th district (2021–present)
- John Zaccaro, state assemblymember from the 80th district (2023–present)

Local officials

- Eric Dinowitz, New York City councilmember from the 11th district (2021–present)
- Oswald Feliz, New York City councilmember from the 15th district (2021–present)
- Vanessa Gibson, Bronx Borough President (2022–present)
- Kevin Riley, New York City councilmember from the 12th district (2021–present)
- Justin Sanchez, New York City councilmember from the 17th district (2026–present)
- Pierina Sanchez, New York City councilmember from the 14th district (2022–present)
- Althea Stevens, New York City councilmember from the 16th district (2022–present)

Labor unions

- Communication Workers of America District 1
- Council of School Supervisors & Administrators
- New York State United Teachers
- NYC District Council of Carpenters

Organizations

- AIPAC
- Congressional Black Caucus
- Congressional Hispanic Caucus
- Democratic Majority for Israel
- Equality PAC
- Jewish Democratic Council of America
- Joint Action Committee for Political Affairs
- National Organization for Women
- Planned Parenthood Action Fund
- Stonewall Democratic Club of New York
Declined to endorse

Local officials

- Zohran Mamdani, mayor of New York City (2026–present)

==== Fundraising ====
Italics indicate a withdrawn candidate.

Campaign finance reports as of June 3, 2026
Candidate	Raised	Spent	Cash on hand
Michael Blake (D)	$412,123	$326,953	$85,170
Ritchie Torres (D)	$6,684,978	$3,538,208	$14,570,752
Jose Vega (D)	$264,784	$255,458	$10,599
Source: Federal Election Commission

==== Polling ====
Poll source	Date(s) administered	Sample size	Margin of error	Michael Blake	Ritchie Torres	Jose Vega	Undecided
Braun Research (Note: Poll sponsored by A Fight Worth Having PAC, which supports Blake)	April 28 – May 10, 2026	422 (LV)	± 4.9%	15%	60%	7%	18%

==== Results ====
2026 Democratic primary results by precinct Torres: 40–50%; 50–60%; 60–70%; 70–80%; 80–90%; 90–100%; Blake: 50–60%; Tie: 40–50%

Democratic primary results
Party	Candidate	Votes	%
Democratic	Ritchie Torres (incumbent)	24,598	71.8
Democratic	Michael Blake	7,474	21.8
Democratic	Jose Vega	1,939	5.7
Write-in		229	0.7
Total votes		34,240	100.0

=== Independent and third-party candidates ===
==== Declared ====
- Gonzalo Duran (Conservative), conservative activist and nominee for this seat in 2024
- Andre Easton (Socialism and Liberation), teacher

==== Endorsements ====
Andre Easton (PSL)

City officials

- Kristin Richardson Jordan, former member of the New York City Council (2022–2024) (Democratic)
- Kshama Sawant, former member of the Seattle City Council (2014–2024) (Independent)

==== Fundraising ====
Campaign finance reports as of September 5, 2026
Candidate	Raised	Spent	Cash on hand
Andre Easton (I)	$73,041	$57,738	$6,303
Source: Federal Election Commission

=== General election ===
==== Predictions ====
Source	Ranking	As of
Decision Desk HQ	Safe D	July 14, 2026
The Cook Political Report	Solid D	February 6, 2025
Inside Elections	Solid D	March 7, 2025
Sabato's Crystal Ball	Safe D	September 18, 2025

==== Fundraising ====
Campaign finance reports as of October 14, 2026
Candidate	Raised	Spent	Cash on hand
Ritchie Torres (D)	$7,172,393	$4,760,733	$13,835,642
Andre Easton (PSL)	$93,799	$83,490	$828
Source: Federal Election Commission

==== Results ====
2026 New York's 15th congressional district election
Party	Candidate	Votes	%	±%
Democratic	Ritchie Torres (incumbent)			
Republican	Stylo Sapaskis			
Conservative	Gonzalo Duran			
Socialism and Liberation	Andre Easton			
Speak The Truth	Jose Vega			
Total votes				

== District 16 ==
2026 New York's 16th congressional district election
- Reporting: 82% as of Nov 7 at 5:16 PM EST
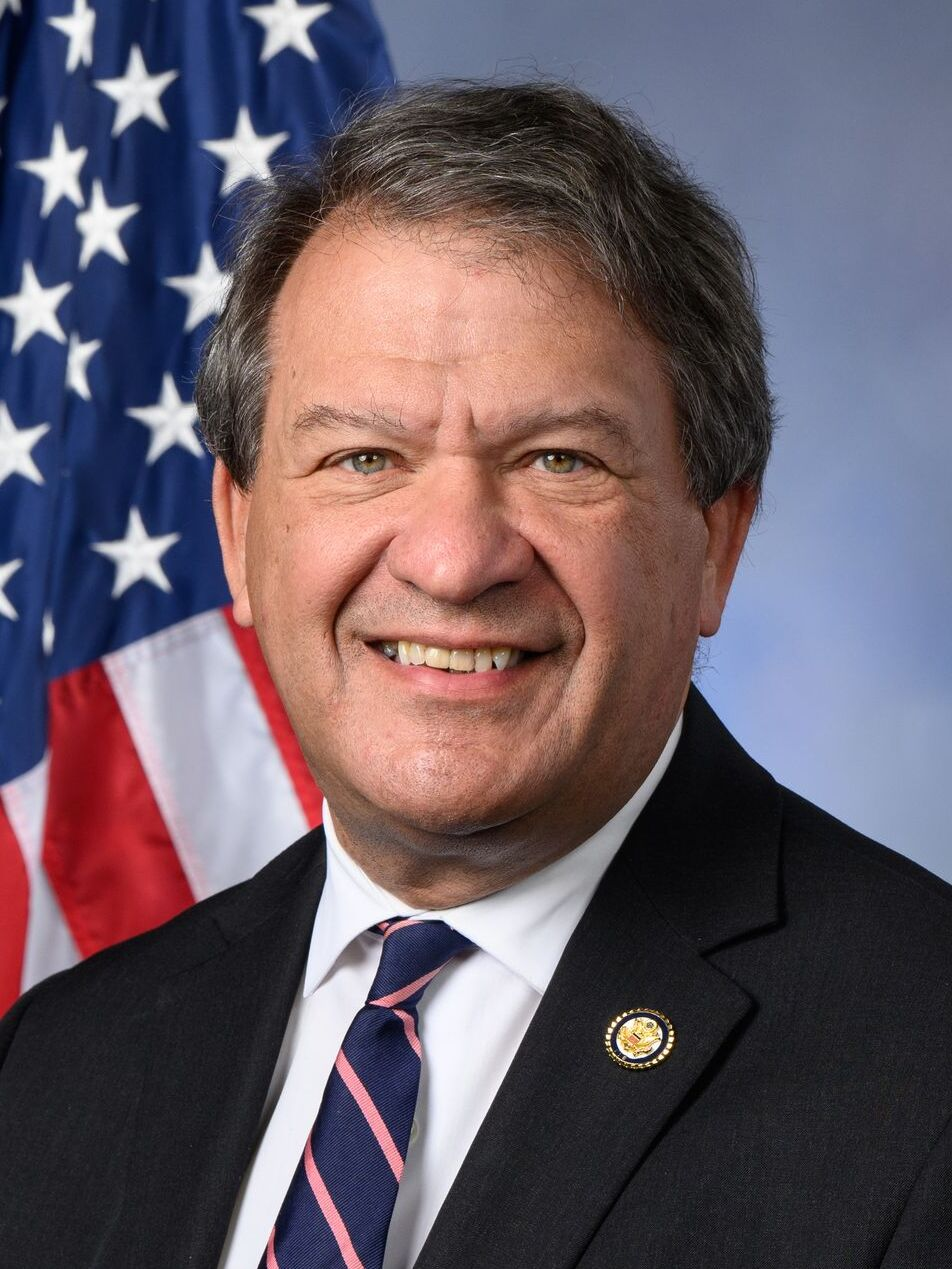

Nominee	George Latimer	Joseph Cinquemani
Party	Democratic	Republican
Popular vote	169,741	53,731
Percentage	75.7%	24.0%
- County results Latimer: 70–80% 90–100%
U.S. Representative before election
George Latimer
Democratic
Elected U.S. Representative
George Latimer
Democratic

The 16th district is based in southern Westchester County, including Yonkers, White Plains, New Rochelle, and Rye. It also includes Co-op City in the Bronx. The incumbent is Democrat George Latimer, who was elected with 71.5% of the vote in 2024.

=== Democratic primary ===
==== Nominee ====
- George Latimer, incumbent U.S. representative

==== Declined ====
- Jamaal Bowman, former U.S. representative for this district (2021–2025)

==== Endorsements ====
George Latimer

Labor unions

- Communication Workers of America District 1
- Council of School Supervisors & Administrators
- NYC District Council of Carpenters

Organizations

- AIPAC
- Democratic Majority for Israel
- Jewish Democratic Council of America
- Joint Action Committee for Political Affairs
- League of Conservation Voters Action Fund
- Planned Parenthood Action Fund
- Stonewall Democratic Club of New York

==== Fundraising ====
Campaign finance reports as of June 3, 2025
Candidate	Raised	Spent	Cash on hand
George Latimer (D)	$489,300	$587,833	$94,120
Source: Federal Election Commission

=== Republican primary ===
==== Nominee ====
- Joseph Cinquemani, attorney

=== General election ===
==== Predictions ====
Source	Ranking	As of
Decision Desk HQ	Safe D	July 14, 2026
The Cook Political Report	Solid D	February 6, 2025
Inside Elections	Solid D	March 7, 2025
Sabato's Crystal Ball	Safe D	September 18, 2025

==== Fundraising ====
Campaign finance reports as of September 30, 2026
Candidate	Raised	Spent	Cash on hand
George Latimer (D)	$662,166	$713,996	$140,824
Source: Federal Election Commission

==== Results ====
2026 New York's 16th congressional district election
Party	Candidate	Votes	%	±%
Democratic	George Latimer (incumbent)			
Republican	Joseph Cinquemani			
Total votes				

== District 17 ==
2026 New York's 17th congressional district election
- Reporting: 95% as of Nov 7 at 5:16 PM EST

Nominee	Cait Conley	Mike Lawler
Party	Democratic	Republican
Alliance	Working Families	Conservative
Popular vote	164,679	145,632
Percentage	53.0%	46.9%
- Conley: 60–70% Lawler: 50–60%
U.S. Representative before election
Mike Lawler
Republican
Elected U.S. Representative
Cait Conley
Democratic

The 17th district is based in the Lower Hudson Valley, including all of Rockland and Putnam counties, northern Westchester County, and a small part of Dutchess County. The incumbent is Republican Mike Lawler, who was re-elected with 52.2% of the vote in 2024. Lawler is one of only three Republicans in the 119th Congress to represent a district that was carried by Democrat Kamala Harris in the 2024 presidential election, making this race a key Democratic target. Lawler is running for re-election.

The election is one of the most expensive congressional races in the 2026 elections, with over $32.7 million in spending.

=== Republican primary ===
==== Nominee ====
- Mike Lawler, incumbent U.S. representative

==== Declined ====
- Bill Weber, state senator from the 38th district (2023–present) (running for re-election)

==== Endorsements ====
Mike Lawler

Executive branch officials

- Donald Trump, president of the United States (2017–2021, 2025–present)

U.S. representatives

- Jared Golden, ME-02 (2019-present) (Democratic)
- Mike Johnson, speaker of the House (2023–present) from LA-04 (2017–present)

Organizations

- Log Cabin Republicans
- Republican Jewish Coalition

Political parties

- Conservative Party of New York State

==== Fundraising ====
Campaign finance reports as of June 3, 2025
Candidate	Raised	Spent	Cash on hand
Mike Lawler (R)	$7,472,987	$3,286,804	$4,355,552
Source: Federal Election Commission

=== Democratic primary ===
==== Nominee ====
- Cait Conley, former senior advisor to the Cybersecurity and Infrastructure Security Agency

==== Eliminated in primary ====
- John Cappello, non-profit executive
- Beth Davidson, Rockland County legislator
- Effie Phillips-Staley, Tarrytown village trustee
- Mike Sacks, former WNYW political reporter

==== Withdrawn ====
- Peter Chatzky, former mayor of Briarcliff Manor
- Jessica Reinmann, nonprofit CEO (endorsed Conley)
- John Sullivan, former FBI intelligence analyst

==== Declined ====
- Brandon del Pozo, professor and former NYPD officer
- Sean Patrick Maloney, former U.S. Ambassador to the OECD (2024–2025) and former U.S. representative from the 18th district (2013–2023)
- Neal Zuckerman, Metropolitan Transportation Authority board member

==== Endorsements ====
Cait Conley

Executive branch officials

- Maura Sullivan, former assistant to the secretary of defense for public affairs (2015)

U.S. representatives

- Jason Crow, CO-06 (2019–present)
- Mark Takano, CA-39 (2013–present)
- Max Rose, former NY-11 (2019–2021)
- Pat Ryan, NY-18 (2022–present)
- Ritchie Torres, NY-15 (2021–present)
- Sean Patrick Maloney, former NY-18 (2013–2023)
- Seth Moulton, MA-06 (2015–present)

Statewide officials

- Eliot Spitzer, former governor of New York (2007–2008)

Local officials

- Mimi Rocah, former district attorney of Westchester County (2021–2024)

Individuals

- Rebecca Bennett, healthcare executive and former United States Navy aviator
- JoAnna Mendoza, former veteran services representative for U.S. Representative Tom O'Halleran
- Jessica Reinmann, nonprofit CEO and former candidate for this seat

Labor unions

- New York State United Teachers

Organizations

- Democratic Majority for Israel
- End Citizens United
- Equality PAC
- Giffords
- LPAC
- Majority Democrats
- Natural Resources Defense Council
- NewDem Action Fund
- VoteVets

Party branches

- Dutchess County Democratic Committee
- Putnam County Democratic Committee
Beth Davidson

U.S. representatives

- Mondaire Jones, former NY-17 (2021–2023)

State legislators

- Patrick Carroll, New York state assemblymember from the 96th district (2025–present)
- Sandy Galef, former New York state assemblymember from the 90th district (1993–2012) and the 95th district (2013–2022)

Party branches

- Rockland County Democratic Committee
Effie Phillips-Staley

U.S. representatives

- Jamaal Bowman, former NY-16 (2021–2025)
- Ro Khanna, CA-17 (2017–present)

State legislators

- Nina Turner, former Ohio state senator from the 25th district (2008–2014)

Individuals

- Zephyr Teachout, attorney

Organizations

- Latino Victory Fund
- Our Revolution
- Track AIPAC

Political parties

- Working Families Party
Declined to endorse

Party branches

- Westchester County Democratic Committee

==== Fundraising ====
Italics indicate a withdrawn candidate.

Campaign finance reports as of June 3, 2025
Candidate	Raised	Spent	Cash on hand
John Cappello (D)	$77,637	$56,527	$21,110
Cait Conley (D)	$3,258,198	$2,317,224	$940,973
Beth Davidson (D)	$2,062,801	$1,648,553	$414,247
Effie Phillips-Staley (D)	$695,629	$640,371	$55,333
Mike Sacks (D)	$298,002	$281,081	$16,921
Source: Federal Election Commission

==== Polling ====
Poll source	Date(s) administered	Sample size	Margin of error	Peter Chatzky	Cait Conley	Beth Davidson	Effie Phillips-Staley	Other	Undecided
Public Policy Polling (D) (Note: Poll commissioned by Majority Democrats, which supports Conley)	June 15–16, 2026	553 (LV)	–	–	33%	19%	14%	6% (Note: Mike Sacks with 5%; John Cappello with 1%)	28%
Tavern Research (D)	June 12–16, 2026	574 (LV)	± 5.0%	–	34%	23%	13%	2% (Note: John Cappello & Mike Sacks with 1%)	28%
Global Strategy Group (D) (Note: Poll sponsored by VoteVets, which supports Conley)	May 7–12, 2026	500 (LV)	± 4.4%	–	29%	22%	6%	6% (Note: Mike Sacks with 4%; John Cappello with 2%)	37%
Data for Progress (D) (Note: Poll sponsored by Phillips-Staley's campaign.)	April 17–24, 2026	436 (LV)	–	–	15%	26%	8%	–	51%
	April 9, 2026	Chatzky withdraws from the race							
Impact Research (D) (Note: Poll sponsored by Davidson's campaign.)	February 24–26, 2026	400 (LV)	± 4.9%	8%	17%	23%	8%	2% (Note: John Cappello and Mike Sacks with 1%)	45%
Lake Research Partners (D) (Note: Poll sponsored by Chatzky's campaign.)	January 27 – February 1, 2026	401 (LV)	± 4.9%	12%	18%	17%	5%	2% (Note: Mike Sacks with 2%; John Cappello with 0%)	41%

==== Results ====

Conley

40–50%
50–60%

Conley

30–40%
40–50%
50–60%
60–70%
70–80%
80–90%
90–100%

Davidson

30–40%
40–50%
50–60%
60–70%
70–80%
80–90%
90–100%

Phillips-Staley

30–40%
40–50%
50–60%

Other

Tie
No Votes

Democratic primary results
Party	Candidate	Votes	%
Democratic	Cait Conley	23,263	49.6
Democratic	Beth Davidson	14,938	31.8
Democratic	Effie Phillips-Staley	7,196	15.3
Democratic	John Cappello	758	1.6
Democratic	Michael Sacks	756	1.6
Write-in		37	0.1
Total votes		46,948	100.0

=== General election ===
Conley and Lawler faced off in a debate broadcast by News12 Hudson Valley on September 28.

==== Predictions ====
Source	Ranking	As of
Decision Desk HQ	Tossup	November 3, 2026
The Cook Political Report	Tossup	January 15, 2026
Inside Elections	Tossup	November 11, 2025
Sabato's Crystal Ball	Lean R	November 2, 2026

==== Post-primary endorsements ====
Mike Lawler (R)

U.S. representatives

- Jared Golden, ME-02 (2019–present) (Democratic)

Labor unions

- American Federation of Government Employees
- American Maritime Officers
- Brotherhood of Railroad Signalmen
- International Organization of Masters, Mates & Pilots
- International Union of Elevator Constructors
- Laborers’ International Union of North America New York
- Marine Engineers' Beneficial Association
- National Federation of Federal Employees
- North Atlantic States Regional Council of Carpenters
- Seafarers International Union
- Sergeants Benevolent Association
- Teamsters Joint Council 16
- Transport Workers Union of America

Organizations

- Armenian National Committee of America
- Citizens for Responsible Energy Solutions
- U.S. Chamber of Commerce
Cait Conley (D)

Executive branch officials

- Pete Buttigieg, former secretary of transportation (2021–2025)

U.S. senators

- Mark Kelly, Arizona (2020–present)
- Elissa Slotkin, Michigan (2025–present)

U.S. representatives

- Suzan DelBene, WA-01 (2012–present)
- Gabby Giffords, former AZ-8 (2007–2012)
- Hakeem Jeffries, NY-08 (2013–present)
- Jamie Raskin, MD-08 (2017–present)
- Pat Ryan, NY-18 (2022–present)

Statewide officials

- Mikie Sherrill, governor of New Jersey (2026–present)

Labor unions

- American Association of University Professors

Organizations

- DCCC Red to Blue
- Democrats for Education Reform
- EMILYs List
- House Majority PAC
- J Street
- Jewish Democratic Council of America

==== Fundraising ====
Campaign finance reports as of October 14, 2026
Candidate	Raised	Spent	Cash on hand
Mike Lawler (R)	$10,317,627	$8,527,472	$1,959,524
Cait Conley (D)	$10,706,692	$9,758,153	$948,540
Source: Federal Election Commission

==== Polling ====
Poll source	Date(s) administered	Sample size	Margin of error	Mike Lawler (R)	Cait Conley (D)	Undecided
RedBox Research (D) (Note: Poll sponsored by A Fight Worth Having)	October 20–23, 2026	726 (LV)	± 4.5%	46%	48%	6% (Note: "Someone else" with 2%; "Prefer not to answer" with 1%)
McLaughlin & Associates (R) (Note: Poll sponsored by Lawler's campaign)	September 28–30, 2026	400 (LV)	± 4.9%	50%	47%	3%
Emerson College (Note: Poll sponsored by WPIX)	September 27–29, 2026	400 (LV)	± 4.9%	46%	48%	7%
co/efficient (R)	July 20–22, 2026	1,292 (LV)	± 2.7%	50%	45%	5%
FM3 Research (D)	June 27 – July 1, 2026	509 (LV)	–	45%	51%	4%

==== Results ====
2026 New York's 17th congressional district election
Party	Candidate	Votes	%	±%
Republican	Mike Lawler			
Conservative	Mike Lawler			
Total	Mike Lawler (incumbent)			
Democratic	Cait Conley			
Working Families	Cait Conley			
Total	Cait Conley			
Total votes				

== District 18 ==
2026 New York's 18th congressional district election
- Reporting: 89% as of Nov 6 at 11:51 AM EST
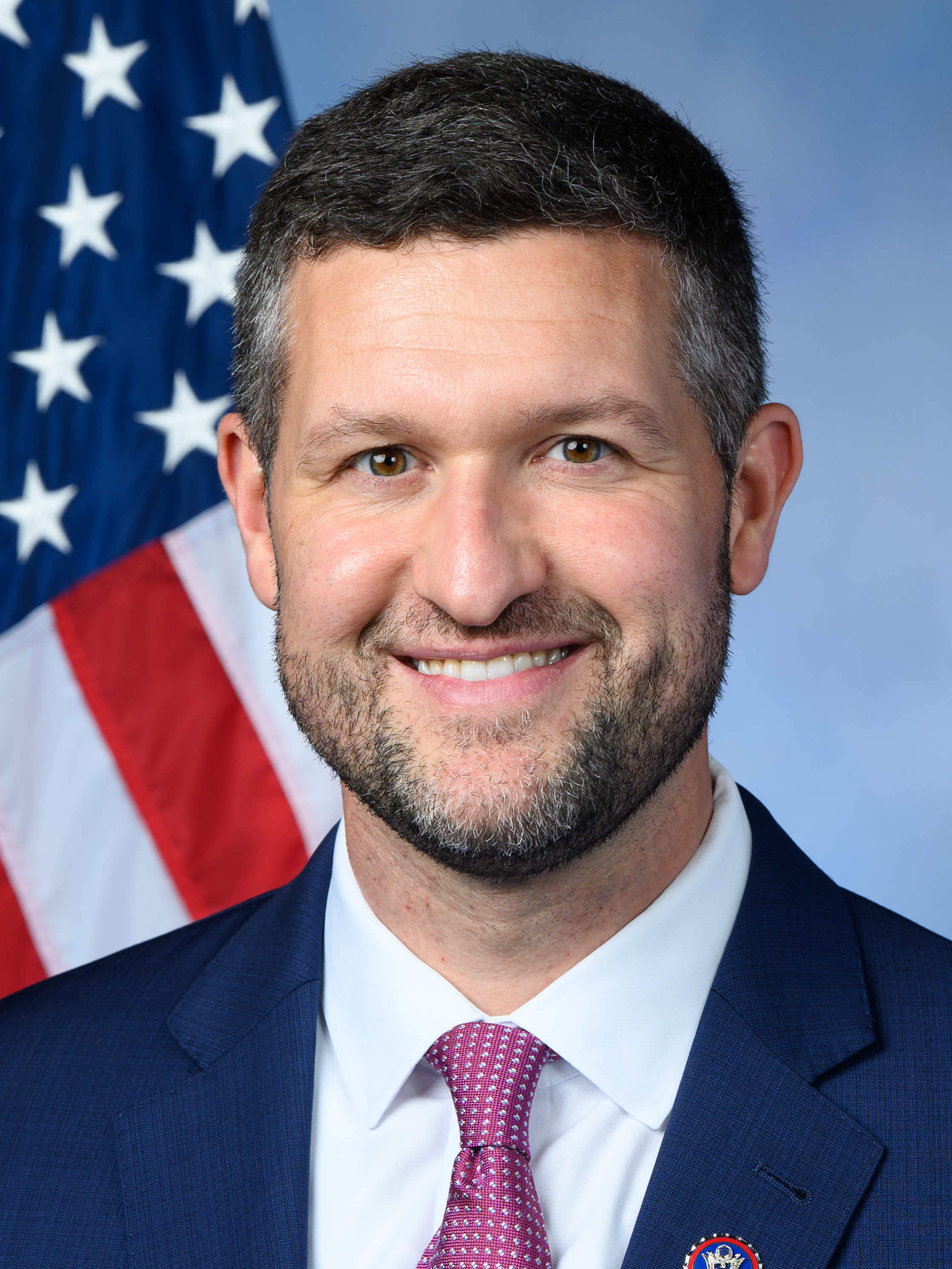

Nominee	Pat Ryan	Jacqueline Auringer
Party	Democratic	Republican
Alliance	Working Families	Conservative
Popular vote	169,001	99,621
Percentage	62.9%	37.1%
- County results Ryan: 60–70%
U.S. Representative before election
Pat Ryan
Democratic
Elected U.S. Representative
Pat Ryan
Democratic

The 18th district is based in the mid-Hudson Valley, including all of Orange County and most of Dutchess and Ulster counties. The incumbent is Democrat Pat Ryan, who was re-elected with 57.2% of the vote in 2024.

=== Democratic primary ===
==== Nominee ====
- Pat Ryan, incumbent U.S. representative

==== Endorsements ====
Pat Ryan

Labor unions

- Communication Workers of America District 1
- Council of School Supervisors & Administrators
- New York State Nurses Association

Organizations

- ~~AIPAC~~ (endorsement rejected by candidate)
- Brady Campaign
- Citizen Action of New York
- ~~Democratic Majority for Israel~~ (endorsement rejected by candidate)
- End Citizens United
- Jewish Democratic Council of America
- Joint Action Committee for Political Affairs
- Planned Parenthood Action Fund
- Population Connection
- Reproductive Freedom for All

Political parties

- New York Working Families Party

==== Fundraising ====
Campaign finance reports as of June 3, 2025
Candidate	Raised	Spent	Cash on hand
Pat Ryan (D)	$4,465,683	$1,684,537	$2,948,337
Source: Federal Election Commission

=== Republican primary ===
==== Nominee ====
- Jackie Auringer, businesswoman

==== Withdrawn ====
- Sharanjit Thind, former Nassau County human rights commissioner

==== Endorsements ====
Jackie Auringer

Organizations

- Log Cabin Republicans

Political parties

- Conservative Party of New York State

==== Fundraising ====
Italics indicate a withdrawn candidate.

Campaign finance reports as of June 3, 2025
Candidate	Raised	Spent	Cash on hand
Jackie Auringer (R)	$49,265	$9,914	$39,351
Source: Federal Election Commission

=== General election ===
==== Predictions ====
Source	Ranking	As of
Decision Desk HQ	Safe D	July 14, 2026
The Cook Political Report	Solid D	January 15, 2026
Inside Elections	Solid D	December 5, 2025
Sabato's Crystal Ball	Safe D	March 26, 2026

==== Fundraising ====
Campaign finance reports as of September 30, 2026
Candidate	Raised	Spent	Cash on hand
Pat Ryan (D)	$5,290,715	$2,775,384	$2,682,522
Jacqueline Auringer (R)	$153,367	$103,663	$49,704
Source: Federal Election Commission

==== Polling ====
Poll source	Date(s) administered	Sample size	Margin of error	Pat Ryan (D)	Jacqueline Auringer (R)	Undecided
Public Policy Polling (D)	September 29–30, 2026	561 (LV)	–	52%	35%	13%
Global Strategy Group (D) (Note: Poll sponsored by Ryan's campaign)	July 23–26, 2026	500 (LV)	± 4.4%	53%	39%	8%

Hypothetical polling

Generic ballot

Poll source	Date(s) administered	Sample size	Margin of error	Generic Democrat	Generic Republican	Undecided
Public Policy Polling (D)	September 29–30, 2026	561 (LV)	–	51%	42%	7%

==== Results ====
2026 New York's 18th congressional district election
Party	Candidate	Votes	%	±%
Democratic	Pat Ryan			
Working Families	Pat Ryan			
Total	Pat Ryan (incumbent)			
Republican	Jacqueline Auringer			
Conservative	Jacqueline Auringer			
Total	Jacqueline Auringer			
Total votes				

== District 19 ==
2026 New York's 19th congressional district election
- Reporting: 97% as of Nov 6 at 2:32 PM EST
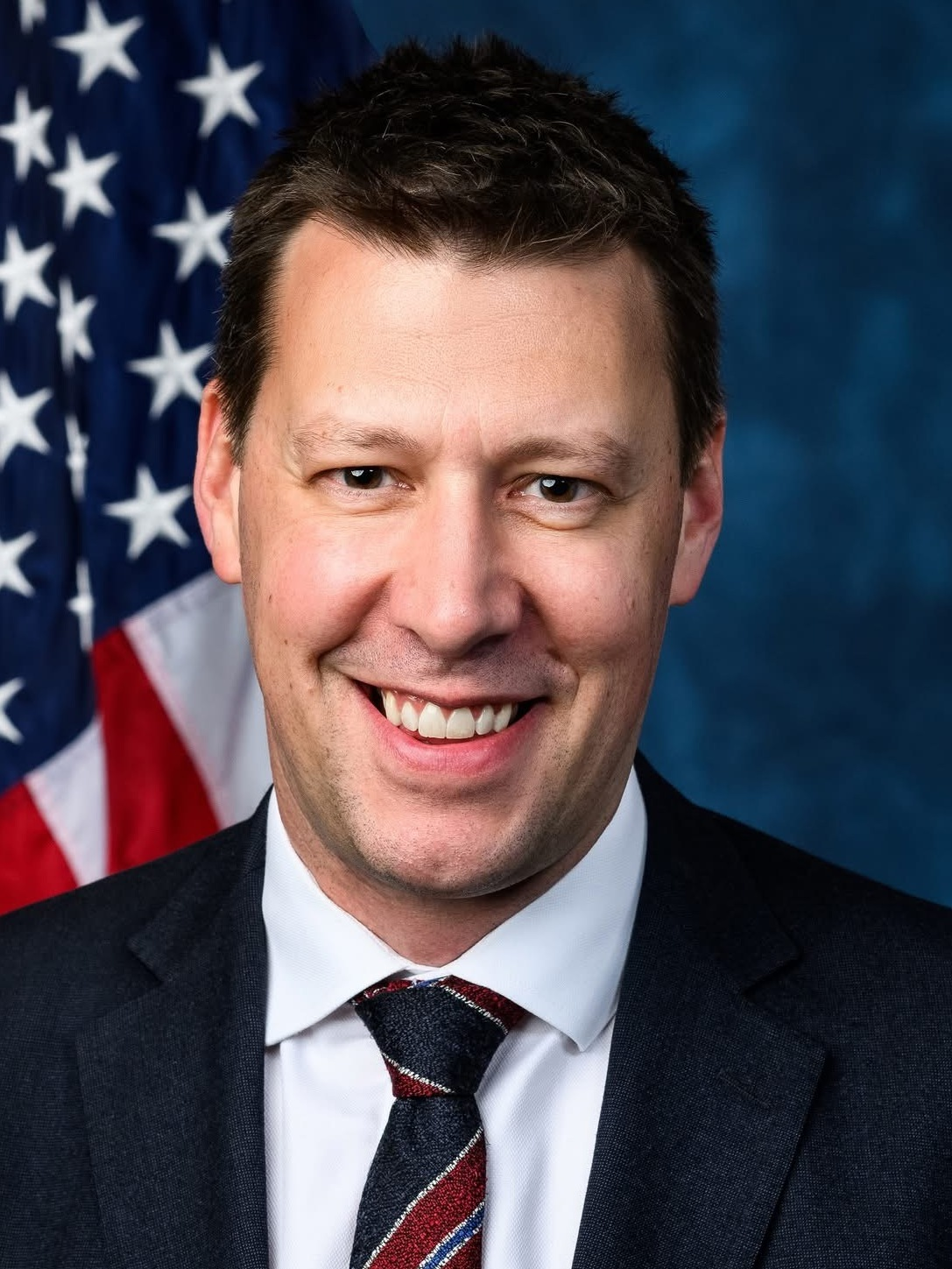

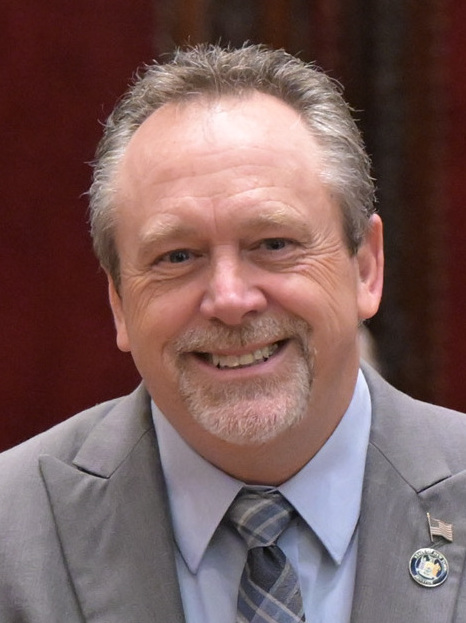
Nominee	Josh Riley	Peter Oberacker
Party	Democratic	Republican
Alliance	Working Families	Conservative
Popular vote	167,964	124,754
Percentage	57.3%	42.6%
- County results Riley: 50–60% 60–70% 70–80% Oberacker: 50–60% 60–70%
U.S. Representative before election
Josh Riley
Democratic
Elected U.S. Representative
Josh Riley
Democratic

The 19th district stretches from the Upper Hudson Valley across the Catskill Mountains to parts of the Southern Tier and Finger Lakes, including Hudson, Monticello, Oneonta, Binghamton, and Ithaca. It includes all of Columbia, Greene, Sullivan, Delaware, Otsego, Chenango, Broome, and Tompkins counties, and parts of Rensselaer, Cortland, and Ulster counties. The incumbent is Democrat Josh Riley, who flipped the district and was elected with 51.1% of the vote in 2024.

=== Democratic primary ===
==== Nominee ====
- Josh Riley, incumbent U.S. representative

==== Endorsements ====
Josh Riley

Labor unions

- Communication Workers of America District 1
- Council of School Supervisors & Administrators

Organizations

- AIPAC
- Brady Campaign
- Democratic Majority for Israel
- End Citizens United
- Giffords
- Jewish Democratic Council of America
- Joint Action Committee for Political Affairs
- League of Conservation Voters Action Fund
- Natural Resources Defense Council
- Planned Parenthood Action Fund
- Population Connection
- Reproductive Freedom for All

Political parties

- New York Working Families Party

==== Fundraising ====
Campaign finance reports as of June 3, 2025
Candidate	Raised	Spent	Cash on hand
Josh Riley (D)	$4,336,327	$1,484,272	$2,920,374
Source: Federal Election Commission

=== Republican primary ===
==== Nominee ====
- Peter Oberacker, state senator from the 51st district (2021–present)

==== Eliminated in primary ====
- Alexander Portelli, small business owner

==== Declined ====
- Haris Alic, communications director for the House Foreign Affairs Committee (endorsed Oberacker)
- Marc Molinaro, former administrator of the Federal Transit Administration (2025–2026) and former U.S. representative from New York's 19th congressional district (2023–2025) (running for state assembly)

==== Endorsements ====
Peter Oberacker

Executive branch officials

- Donald Trump, president of the United States (2017–2021, 2025–present)

U.S. representatives

- Richard Hudson, NC-09 (2013–present)
- Mike Johnson, Speaker of the House (2023–present) from LA-04 (2017–present)
- Mike Lawler, NY-17 (2023–present)

State legislators

- Chris Tague, AD-102 (2018–present)

Organizations

- Log Cabin Republicans
- NRCC MAGA Majority

Political parties

- Conservative Party of New York State

==== Fundraising ====
Campaign finance reports as of June 3, 2025
Candidate	Raised	Spent	Cash on hand
Peter Oberacker (R)	$956,745	$704,594	$252,151
Source: Federal Election Commission

==== Results ====
Republican primary results
Party	Candidate	Votes	%
Republican	Peter Oberacker	13,770	77.4
Republican	Alexander Portelli	3,938	22.1
Write-in		82	0.5
Total votes		17,790	100.0

=== General election ===
==== Predictions ====
Source	Ranking	As of
Decision Desk HQ	Likely D	July 14, 2026
The Cook Political Report	Likely D	July 16, 2026
Inside Elections	Solid D	October 15, 2026
Sabato's Crystal Ball	Likely D	July 30, 2026

==== Fundraising ====
Campaign finance reports as of September 30, 2026
Candidate	Raised	Spent	Cash on hand
Josh Riley (D)	$5,844,412	$3,748,215	$2,164,517
Peter Oberacker (R)	$1,409,090	$1,365,660	$43,430
Source: Federal Election Commission

==== Results ====
2026 New York's 19th congressional district election
Party	Candidate	Votes	%	±%
Democratic	Josh Riley			
Working Families	Josh Riley			
Total	Josh Riley (incumbent)			
Republican	Peter Oberacker			
Conservative	Peter Oberacker			
Total	Peter Oberacker			
Total votes				

== District 20 ==
2026 New York's 20th congressional district election
- Reporting: 96% as of Nov 6 at 4:50 PM EST
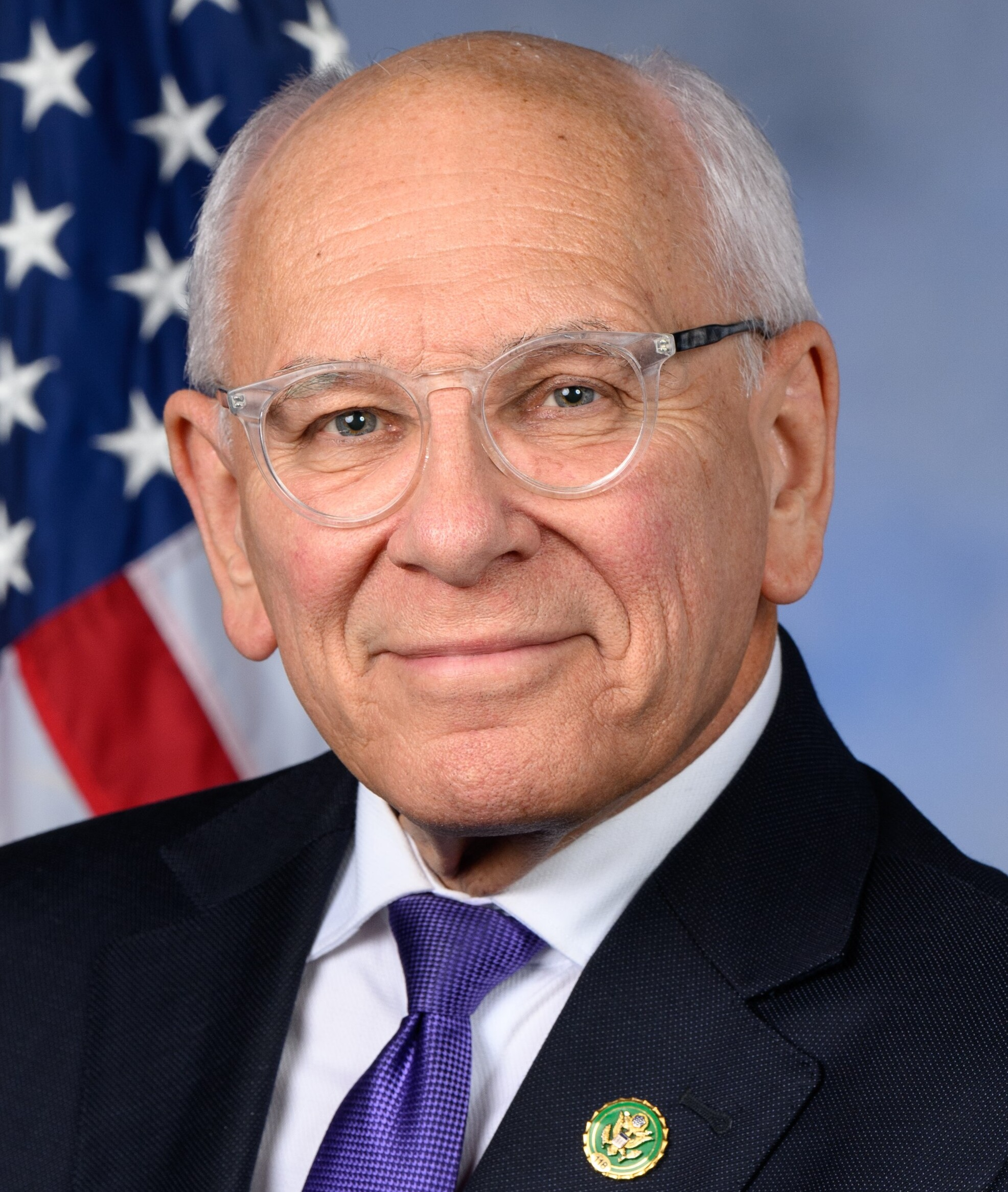

Nominee	Paul Tonko	Ralph Ambrosio
Party	Democratic	Republican
Alliance	Working Families	Conservative
Popular vote	181,890	103,946
Percentage	63.6%	36.3%
- County results Tonko: 50–60% 60–70%
U.S. Representative before election
Paul Tonko
Democratic
Elected U.S. Representative
Paul Tonko
Democratic

The 20th district is based in the Capital Region, including Albany, Troy, Schenectady, Saratoga Springs, and Amsterdam. It includes all of Albany and Schenectady counties, and parts of Saratoga, Rensselaer, and Montgomery counties. The incumbent is Democrat Paul Tonko, who was re-elected with 61.1% of the vote in 2024.

=== Democratic primary ===
==== Nominee ====
- Paul Tonko, incumbent U.S. representative

==== Endorsements ====
Paul Tonko

Labor unions

- Communication Workers of America District 1
- Council of School Supervisors & Administrators

Organizations

- J Street PAC
- League of Conservation Voters Action Fund
- Peace Action
- Planned Parenthood Action Fund

Political parties

- New York Working Families Party

==== Fundraising ====
Campaign finance reports as of June 3, 2025
Candidate	Raised	Spent	Cash on hand
Paul Tonko (D)	$825,396	$1,043,497	$381,401
Source: Federal Election Commission

=== Republican primary ===
==== Nominee ====
- Ralph Ambrosio, attorney

==== Endorsements ====
Ralph Ambrosio

Political parties

- Conservative Party of New York State

==== Fundraising ====
Campaign finance reports as of June 3, 2025
Candidate	Raised	Spent	Cash on hand
Ralph Ambrosio (R)	$24,403	$14,513	$9,890
Source: Federal Election Commission

=== General election ===
==== Predictions ====
Source	Ranking	As of
Decision Desk HQ	Safe D	July 14, 2026
The Cook Political Report	Solid D	February 6, 2025
Inside Elections	Solid D	March 7, 2025
Sabato's Crystal Ball	Safe D	September 18, 2025

==== Fundraising ====
Campaign finance reports as of September 30, 2026
Candidate	Raised	Spent	Cash on hand
Paul Tonko (D)	$1,208,217	$1,340,294	$467,425
Ralph Ambrosio (R)	$60,560	$48,245	$12,315
Source: Federal Election Commission

==== Results ====
2026 New York's 20th congressional district election
Party	Candidate	Votes	%	±%
Democratic	Paul Tonko			
Working Families	Paul Tonko			
Total	Paul Tonko (incumbent)			
Republican	Ralph Ambrosio			
Conservative	Ralph Ambrosio			
Total	Ralph Ambrosio			
Total votes				

== District 21 ==
2026 New York's 21st congressional district election
- Reporting: 97% as of Nov 6 at 9:34 PM EST

Nominee	Anthony Constantino	Blake Gendebien
Party	Republican	Democratic
Alliance	Taxpayer Rights
Popular vote	140,428	135,187
Percentage	50.8%	48.9%
- County results Constantino: 50–60% 60–70% Gendebien: 50–60%
U.S. Representative before election
Elise Stefanik
Republican
Elected U.S. Representative
Anthony Constantino
Republican

The 21st district is based in the North Country and the Adirondack Mountains, and also includes parts of the Mohawk Valley and the Capital District. It includes Glens Falls, Lake George, Plattsburgh, Potsdam, Herkimer, and Rome. The incumbent is Republican Elise Stefanik, who was re-elected with 62.1% of the vote in 2024. She is not seeking re-election.

=== Republican primary ===
==== Nominee ====
- Anthony Constantino, businessman and candidate for this district in the canceled 2025 special election

==== Eliminated in primary ====
- Robert Smullen, state assemblymember from the 118th district (2019–present) and candidate for this district in the canceled 2025 special election

==== Declined ====
- Liz Joy, realtor, nominee for the 20th district in 2020 and 2022, and candidate for this district in the canceled 2025 special election
- Marc Molinaro, former administrator of the Federal Transit Administration (2025–2026) and former U.S. representative from New York's 19th congressional district (2023–2025) (running for state assembly)
- Josh Parker, businessman and candidate for this district in the canceled 2025 special election
- Dan Stec, state senator from the 45th district (2021–present) and candidate for this district in the canceled 2025 special election (running for re-election)
- Elise Stefanik, incumbent U.S. representative (ran for governor, later withdrew)
- Christopher Tague, state assemblymember from the 102nd district (2018–present), chair of the Schoharie County Republican Party, and candidate for this district in the canceled 2025 special election (running for state senate)
- Mark Walczyk, state senator from the 49th district (2023–present)

==== Endorsements ====
Robert Smullen

State legislators

- William A. Barclay, minority leader of the New York State Assembly (2020–present) from AD-120 (2003–present)
- 45 other state assemblymembers

Party officials

- Edward F. Cox, chair of the New York Republican Party (2009–2019, 2023–present)

Organizations

- New York State Rifle and Pistol Association
- U.S. Chamber of Commerce

Political parties

- Conservative Party of New York State
- New York Republican State Committee
- Warren County Conservative Party
- 11 Republican county committees
Anthony Constantino

Executive branch officials

- Donald Trump, president of the United States (2017–2021, 2025–present)

U.S. representatives

- Jim Jordan, OH-04 (2007–present)

Local officials

- Rudy Giuliani, former mayor of New York City (1994–2001)

Individuals

- Roger Stone, political consultant

==== Debates ====
2026 NY-21 Republican primary debates
No.	Date	Host	Moderator	Link	Participants	
P Participant A Absent N Non-invitee I Invitee W Withdrawn						
P Participant A Absent N Non-invitee I Invitee W Withdrawn					Constantino	Smullen
1	May 28, 2026	CBS6	Tom Eschen	YouTube	P	P

==== Fundraising ====
Campaign finance reports as of June 3, 2025
Candidate	Raised	Spent	Cash on hand
Anthony Constantino (R)	$7,453,187	$6,633,205	$3,126,869
Robert Smullen (R)	$1,300,134	$775,156	$524,978
Source: Federal Election Commission

==== Polling ====
Poll source	Date(s) administered	Sample size	Margin of error	Anthony Constantino	Robert Smullen	Undecided
McLaughlin & Associates (R) (Note: Poll sponsored by Smullen's campaign)	April 14–16, 2026	300 (LV)	± 5.7%	33%	43%	24%
GrayHouse (R) (Note: Poll sponsored by Constantino's campaign)	February 2026	500 (LV)	–	43%	16%	41%
McLaughlin & Associates (R)	January 2026	– (LV)	–	40%	26%	34%

==== Results ====
2026 Republican primary results by county Constantino: 50–60%; 60–70%; 70–80%; Smullen: 50–60%; 60–70%

Republican primary results
Party	Candidate	Votes	%
Republican	Anthony Constantino	26,764	59.2
Republican	Robert Smullen	18,192	40.3
Write-in		218	0.5
Total votes		45,174	100.0

=== Democratic primary ===
==== Nominee ====
- Blake Gendebien, dairy farmer and nominee for this district in the cancelled 2025 special election

==== Eliminated in primary ====
- Stuart Amoriell, restaurant owner

==== Withdrawn ====
- Maylon Haller, hip hop and folk artist
- Dylan Hewitt, former trade official

==== Declined ====
- Matt Castelli, nominee for this district in 2022
- Paula Collins, nominee for this district in 2024 (endorsed Hewitt)

==== Endorsements ====
Blake Gendebien

U.S. representatives

- John Mannion, NY-22 (2025–present)
- Joe Morelle, NY-25 (2018–present)
- Bill Owens, former NY-21 (2009–2015)
- Jamie Raskin, MD-08 (2017–present)
Dylan Hewitt (withdrawn)

U.S. representatives

- Ro Khanna, CA-17 (2017–present)

Individuals

- Zephyr Teachout, attorney

Political parties

- New York Working Families Party

==== Fundraising ====
Campaign finance reports as of June 3, 2025
Candidate	Raised	Spent	Cash on hand
Stuart Amorelli (D)	$137,556	$130,082	$7,474
Blake Gendebien (D)	$5,012,014	$2,977,475	$2,286,881
Source: Federal Election Commission

==== Results ====
Democratic primary results
Party	Candidate	Votes	%
Democratic	Blake Gendebien	15,430	64.6
Democratic	Stuart Amoriell	8,359	35.0
Write-in		111	0.5
Total votes		23,900	100.0

=== Independent and third-party candidates ===
==== Withdrawn ====
- Richard Grayson (Communist Party), writer and perennial candidate
- Christopher Schmidt (Independent), educator

==== Declined ====
- Robert Smullen, state assemblymember from the 118th district (2019–present) and candidate for this election in the Republican primary (Conservative Party)

=== General election ===
==== Predictions ====
Source	Ranking	As of
Decision Desk HQ	Likely R	October 15, 2026
The Cook Political Report	Lean R	October 16, 2026
Inside Elections	Lean R	October 15, 2026
Sabato's Crystal Ball	Lean R	October 20, 2026

==== Post-primary endorsements ====
Blake Gendebien (D)

U.S. representatives

- Suzan DelBene, WA-01 (2012–present)
- Adam Gray, CA-13 (2025–present)
- Greg Stanton, AZ-04 (2019–present)

Organizations

- Blue Dog PAC
- DCCC Red to Blue
- NewDem Action Fund

==== Fundraising ====
Campaign finance reports as of October 14, 2026
Candidate	Raised	Spent	Cash on hand
Anthony Constantino (R)	$14,464,951	$14,472,854	$2,298,984
Blake Gendebien (D)	$7,655,529	$7,543,859	$364,012
Source: Federal Election Commission

==== Polling ====
Poll source	Date(s) administered	Sample size	Margin of error	Anthony Constantino (R)	Blake Gendebien (D)	Other	Undecided
Public Policy Polling (D)	October 12–13, 2026	613 (LV)	–	46%	44%	–	10%
Siena University (Note: Poll sponsored by Times Union, WPTZ and WAMC.)	September 30 – October 6, 2026	496 (LV)	± 4.2%	42%	46%	5% (Note: Chris Schmidt (I) with 5%)	7%
Impact Research (D) (Note: Poll sponsored by Gendebien’s campaign)	September 29 – October 4, 2026	500 (LV)	± 4.4%	48%	45%	—	7%
Public Policy Polling (D) (Note: Poll sponsored by The Bench, which supports Gendebien)	September 9–10, 2026	557 (RV)	± 4.2%	48%	43%	—	9%
Impact Research (D)	August 30 – September 2, 2026	500 (LV)	± 4.4%	47%	44%	—	9%
J.L. Partners	August 15–17, 2026	500 (LV)	± 4.4%	50%	40%	—	10%
SurveyUSA (Note: Poll sponsored by WNYT)	August 4–8, 2026	612 (LV)	± 4.1%	39%	43%	5%	13%
Impact Research (D)	May 26–31, 2026	500 (LV)	± 4.4%	45%	44%	—	11%

Hypothetical polling

Generic Republican vs. generic Democrat

Poll source	Date(s) administered	Sample size	Margin of error	Generic Republican	Generic Democrat	Undecided
Public Policy Polling (D)	September 9–10, 2026	557 (RV)	± 4.2%	53%	40%	7%

==== Results ====
2026 New York's 21st congressional district election
Party	Candidate	Votes	%	±%
Republican	Anthony Constantino			
Taxpayer Rights	Anthony Constantino			
Total	Anthony Constantino			
Democratic	Blake Gendebien			
Total votes				

== District 22 ==
2026 New York's 22nd congressional district election
- Reporting: 94% as of Nov 6 at 9:34 PM EST
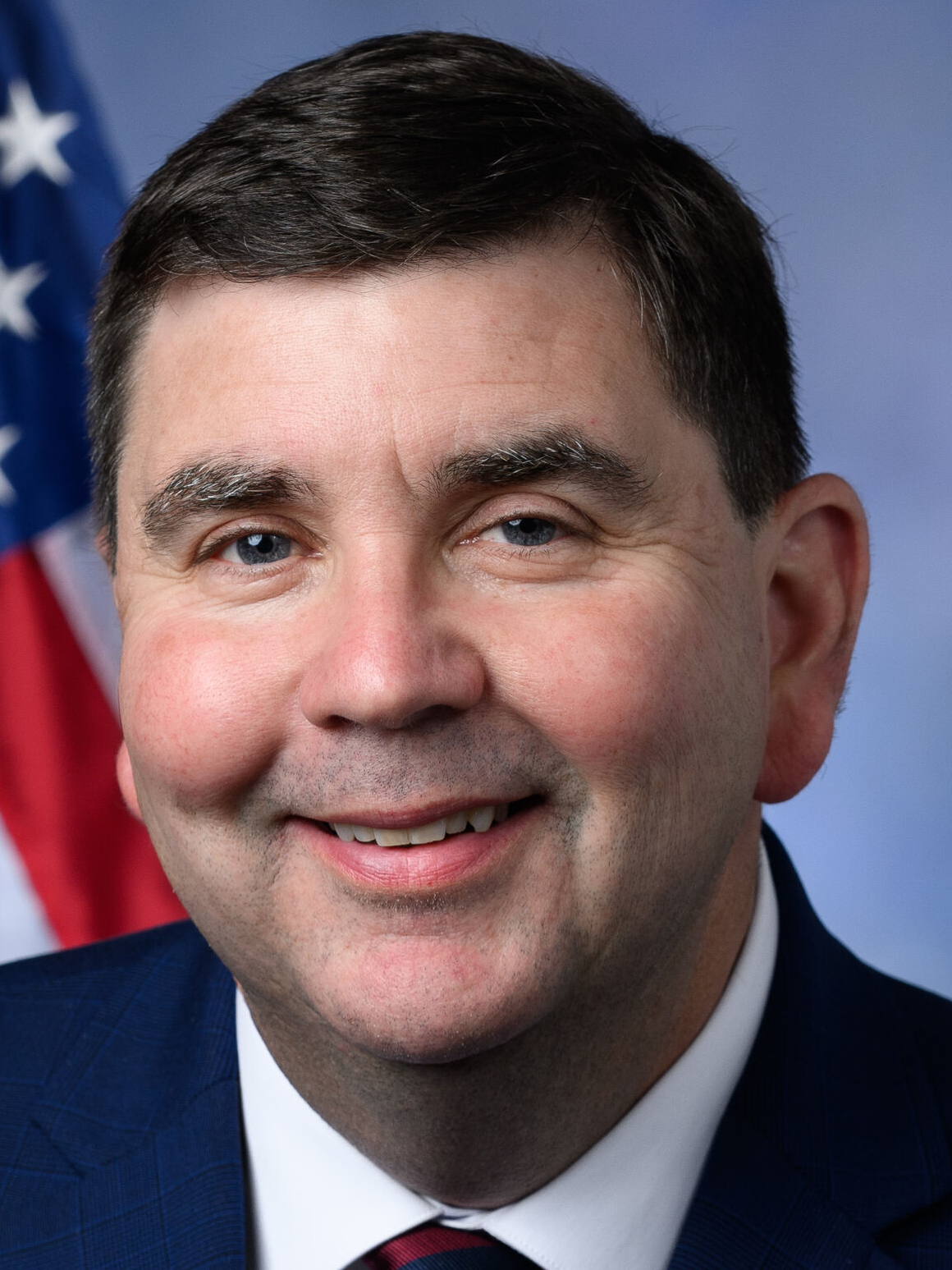

Nominee	John Mannion	Kailee Buller
Party	Democratic	Republican
Alliance	Working Families	Conservative
Popular vote	159,593	113,740
Percentage	58.3%	41.6%
- County results Mannion: 50–60% 60–70% Buller: 50–60%
U.S. Representative before election
John Mannion
Democratic
Elected U.S. Representative
John Mannion
Democratic

The 22nd district is based in Central New York and the Mohawk Valley, including Syracuse and Utica. It includes all of Onondaga and Madison counties and parts of Oneida, Cayuga, and Cortland counties. The incumbent is Democrat John Mannion, who flipped the district and was elected with 54.6% of the vote in 2024.

=== Democratic primary ===
==== Nominee ====
- John Mannion, incumbent U.S. representative

==== Endorsements ====
John Mannion

Labor unions

- Communication Workers of America District 1
- Council of School Supervisors & Administrators

Organizations

- End Citizens United
- Giffords
- J Street PAC
- Jewish Democratic Council of America
- Joint Action Committee for Political Affairs
- League of Conservation Voters Action Fund
- Planned Parenthood Action Fund
- Reproductive Freedom for All

Political parties

- New York Working Families Party

==== Fundraising ====
Campaign finance reports as of June 3, 2025
Candidate	Raised	Spent	Cash on hand
John Mannion (D)	$2,420,032	$904,629	$1,643,644
Source: Federal Election Commission

=== Republican primary ===
==== Nominee ====
- Kailee Buller, former chief of staff of the U.S. Department of Agriculture

==== Withdrawn ====
- David Hollenbeck, entrepreneur
- John Lemondes Jr., state assemblyman from the 126th district (2021–present) and candidate for this district (Note: This district was numbered as the 24th district prior to the 2020 redistricting cycle.) in 2014
- John Salka, former state assemblyman from the 121st district (2019–2023)

==== Declined ====
- Julie Abbott, Onondaga County legislator (2019–2025) and nominee for SD-48 in 2022

=== Endorsements ===
Kailee Buller

Executive branch officials

- Donald Trump, 45th and 47th president of the United States (2017–2021, 2025–present)

U.S. representatives

- Mike Lawler, NY-17 (2023–present)
- Claudia Tenney, NY-24 (2021–present)

Political parties

- Conservative Party of New York State

==== Fundraising ====
Italics indicate a withdrawn candidate.

Campaign finance reports as of June 3, 2026
Candidate	Raised	Spent	Cash on hand
Kailee Buller (R)	$241,523	$47,217	$194,306
Source: Federal Election Commission

=== Independents ===
==== Withdrawn ====
- William Staton, educational consultant

==== Fundraising ====
Campaign finance reports as of March 31, 2026
Candidate	Raised	Spent	Cash on hand
William Staton (I)	$16,344	$0	$16,358
Source: Federal Election Commission

=== General election ===
==== Predictions ====
Source	Ranking	As of
Decision Desk HQ	Safe D	October 8, 2026
The Cook Political Report	Solid D	January 15, 2026
Inside Elections	Solid D	December 5, 2025
Sabato's Crystal Ball	Safe D	March 26, 2026

==== Post-primary endorsements ====
Kailee Buller (R)

Executive branch officials

- Donald Trump, 45th and 47th president of the United States (2017–2021, 2025–present)
John Mannion (D)

Newspapers

- Syracuse.com

==== Fundraising ====
Campaign finance reports as of September 30, 2026
Candidate	Raised	Spent	Cash on hand
John Mannion (D)	$3,140,968	$1,882,440	$1,386,770
Kailee Buller (R)	$428,968	$228,670	$200,298
Source: Federal Election Commission

==== Results ====
2026 New York's 22nd congressional district election
Party	Candidate	Votes	%	±%
Democratic	John Mannion			
Working Families	John Mannion			
Total	John Mannion (incumbent)			
Republican	Kailee Buller			
Conservative	Kailee Buller			
Total	Kailee Buller			
Total votes				

== District 23 ==
2026 New York's 23rd congressional district election
- Reporting: 98% as of Nov 6 at 1:21 PM EST
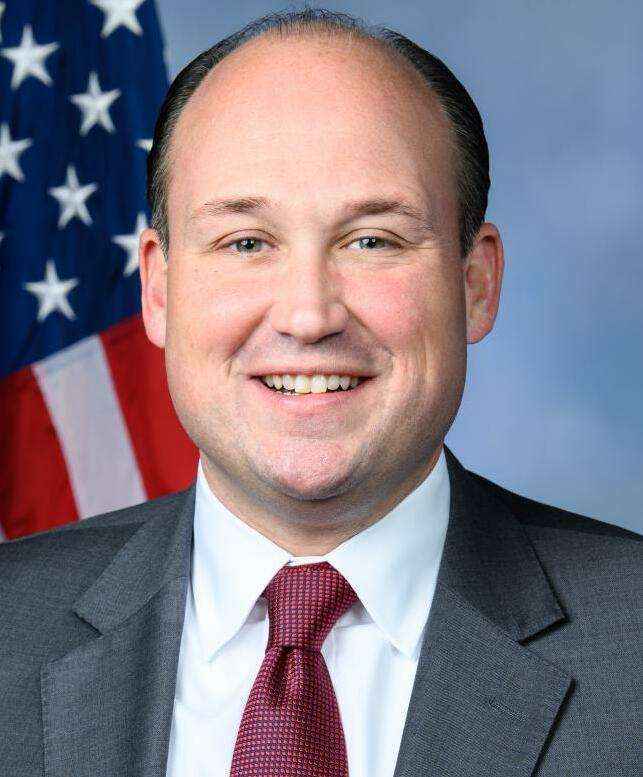

Nominee	Nick Langworthy	Aaron Gies
Party	Republican	Democratic
Alliance	Conservative	Working Families
Popular vote	182,067	120,199
Percentage	60.2%	39.7%
- County results Langworthy: 50–60% 60–70%
U.S. Representative before election
Nick Langworthy
Republican
Elected U.S. Representative
Nick Langworthy
Republican

District 23 is based in the Southern Tier and Western New York, including Elmira, Corning, Jamestown, and outer Erie County. The district is currently represented by Republican Nick Langworthy, who was re-elected with 65.8% of the vote in 2024.

=== Republican primary ===
==== Nominee ====
- Nick Langworthy, incumbent U.S. representative

==== Endorsements ====
Nick Langworthy

Executive branch officials

- Donald Trump, president of the United States (2017–2021, 2025–present)

Labor unions

- North Atlantic Council of Carpenters and Carpenters Local 276

Political parties

- Conservative Party of New York State

==== Fundraising ====
Campaign finance reports as of June 3, 2026
Candidate	Raised	Spent	Cash on hand
Nick Langworthy (R)	$1,975,836	$934,863	$2,134,781
Source: Federal Election Commission

=== Democratic primary ===
==== Nominee ====
- Aaron Gies, professor at St. Bonaventure University

==== Eliminated in primary ====
- Kevin Stocker, attorney and perennial candidate

==== Endorsements ====
Aaron Gies

Labor unions

- Communication Workers of America District 1
- New York State United Teachers

Political parties

- New York Working Families Party

==== Fundraising ====
Campaign finance reports as of June 3, 2026
Candidate	Raised	Spent	Cash on hand
Aaron Gies (D)	$237,997	$176,447	$21,834
Kevin Stocker (D)	$165,000	$167,348	$0
Source: Federal Election Commission

==== Results ====
Democratic primary results
Party	Candidate	Votes	%
Democratic	Aaron Gies	14,049	71.5
Democratic	Kevin Stocker	5,548	28.2
Write-in		50	0.3
Total votes		19,647	100.0

=== General election ===
==== Predictions ====
Source	Ranking	As of
Decision Desk HQ	Likely R	October 30, 2026
The Cook Political Report	Solid R	February 6, 2025
Inside Elections	Solid R	March 7, 2025
Sabato's Crystal Ball	Safe R	September 18, 2025

==== Fundraising ====
Campaign finance reports as of September 30, 2026
Candidate	Raised	Spent	Cash on hand
Nick Langworthy (R)	$2,622,573	$1,152,639	$2,563,742
Aaron Gies (D)	$584,417	$347,472	$230,801
Source: Federal Election Commission

==== Polling ====
Poll source	Date(s) administered	Sample size	Margin of error	Nick Langworthy (R)	Aaron Gies (D)	Undecided
Public Policy Polling (D) (Note: Poll sponsored by Gies' campaign)	September 22–23, 2026	626 (LV)	± 3.9%	52%	35%	13%
Cygnal (R) (Note: Poll sponsored by Lagnworthy's campaign)	September 19–21, 2026	400 (LV)	± 4.9%	54%	33%	13%

==== Results ====
2026 New York's 23rd congressional district election
Party	Candidate	Votes	%	±%
Republican	Nick Langworthy			
Conservative	Nick Langworthy			
Total	Nick Langworthy (incumbent)			
Democratic	Aaron Gies			
Working Families	Aaron Gies			
Total	Aaron Gies			
Total votes				

== District 24 ==
2026 New York's 24th congressional district election
- Reporting: 96% as of Nov 6 at 1:18 PM EST
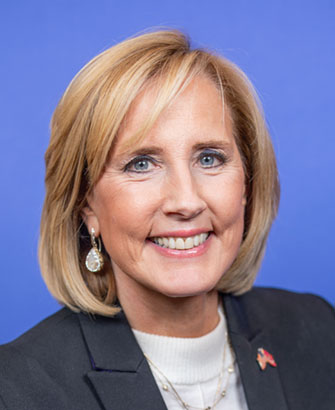

Nominee	Claudia Tenney	Alissa Ellman
Party	Republican	Democratic
Alliance	Conservative	Working Families
Popular vote	171,460	112,261
Percentage	60.4%	39.5%
- County results Tenney: 50–60% 60–70% 70–80% Ellman: 50–60%
U.S. Representative before election
Claudia Tenney
Republican
Elected U.S. Representative
Claudia Tenney
Republican

The 24th district is based along the Lake Ontario coast (minus Rochester) and the upper Finger Lakes, including Watertown, Oswego, Seneca Falls, and Batavia. The incumbent is Republican Claudia Tenney, who was re-elected with 65.7% of the vote in 2024.

=== Republican primary ===
==== Nominee ====
- Claudia Tenney, incumbent U.S. representative

==== Endorsements ====
Claudia Tenney

Political parties

- Conservative Party of New York State

Organizations

- Maggie's List

==== Fundraising ====
Campaign finance reports as of June 3, 2026
Candidate	Raised	Spent	Cash on hand
Claudia Tenney (R)	$2,438,851	$1,664,984	$1,128,870
Source: Federal Election Commission

=== Democratic primary ===
==== Nominee ====
- Alissa Ellman, former program support assistant at the U.S. Department of Veterans Affairs

==== Eliminated in primary ====
- Diana Kastenbaum, manufacturing CEO and Genesee Community College trustee

==== Withdrawn ====
- Steven Holden, financial management consultant and nominee for this district in 2022

==== Endorsements ====
Alissa Ellman

Labor unions

- Communication Workers of America District 1

Political parties

- Forward Party
- New York Working Families Party

==== Fundraising ====
Italics indicate a withdrawn candidate.

Campaign finance reports as of June 3, 2026
Candidate	Raised	Spent	Cash on hand
Alissa Ellman (D)	$167,918	$164,356	$3,562
Diana Kastenbaum (D)	$71,710	$65,982	$5,729
Source: Federal Election Commission

==== Results ====
Democratic primary results
Party	Candidate	Votes	%
Democratic	Alissa Ellman	10,164	61.6
Democratic	Diana Kastenbaum	6,296	38.2
Write-in		31	0.2
Total votes		16,491	100.0

=== Independents ===
==== Withdrawn ====
- Ken Estes, farmer
- Tony Macula
- Todd Sloan, attorney

==== Fundraising ====
Campaign finance reports as of December 31, 2025
Candidate	Raised	Spent	Cash on hand
Ken Estes (I)	$40	$0	$80
Source: Federal Election Commission

=== General election ===
==== Predictions ====
Source	Ranking	As of
Decision Desk HQ	Safe R	July 14, 2026
The Cook Political Report	Solid R	February 6, 2025
Inside Elections	Solid R	March 7, 2025
Sabato's Crystal Ball	Safe R	September 18, 2025

==== Fundraising ====
Campaign finance reports as of September 30, 2026
Candidate	Raised	Spent	Cash on hand
Claudia Tenney (R)	$3,067,819	$2,310,672	$1,112,150
Alissa Ellman (D)	$416,432	$316,624	$99,808
Source: Federal Election Commission

==== Results ====
2026 New York's 24th congressional district election
Party	Candidate	Votes	%	±%
Republican	Claudia Tenney			
Conservative	Claudia Tenney			
Total	Claudia Tenney (incumbent)			
Democratic	Alissa Ellman			
Working Families	Alissa Ellman			
Total	Alissa Ellman			
Total votes				

== District 25 ==
2026 New York's 25th congressional district election
- Reporting: 98% as of Nov 5 at 5:22 PM EST
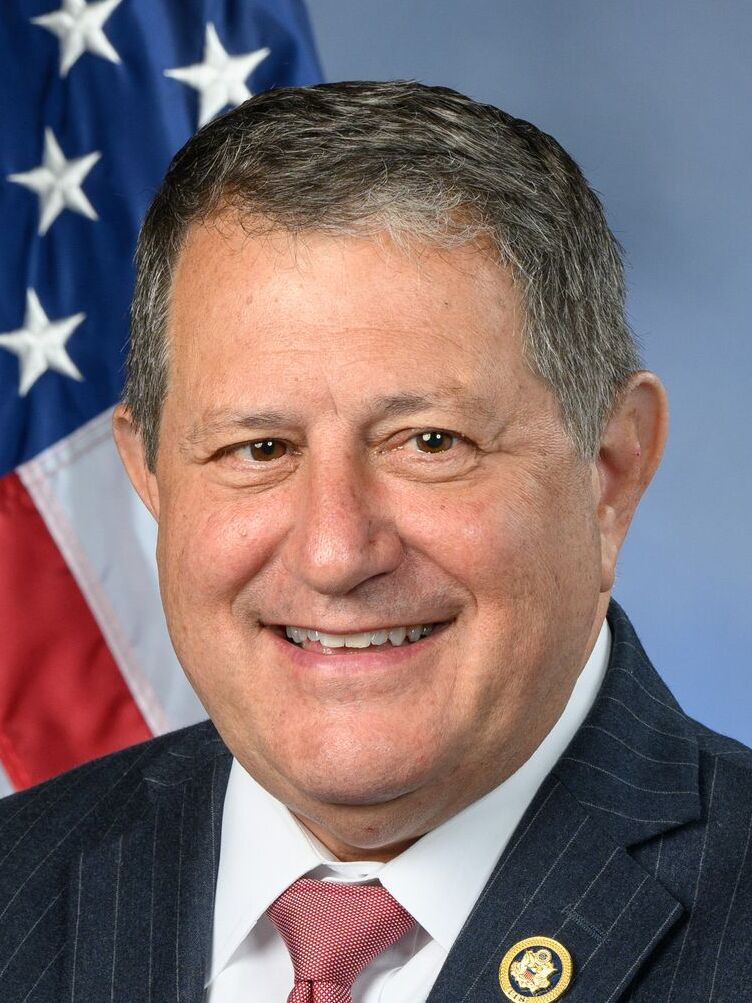

Nominee	Joseph Morelle	Virginia McIntyre
Party	Democratic	Republican
Alliance	Working Families	Conservative
Popular vote	176,401	103,430
Percentage	62.9%	36.9%
- County results Morelle: 50–60% 60–70%
U.S. Representative before election
Joseph Morelle
Democratic
Elected U.S. Representative
Joseph Morelle
Democratic

The 25th district is based in the Rochester area, including all of Monroe County and part of Ontario County. The incumbent is Democrat Joseph Morelle, who was re-elected with 60.8% of the vote in 2024.

=== Democratic primary ===
Incumbent Joseph Morelle had first been elected to the 25th district in 2018 and had been re-elected comfortably since then, with a large financial advantage over his opponents. He faced two primary challenges in 2026; former Brighton town board member Robin Wilt, who had run against Morelle in the 2018 and 2020 primaries, and pastor Sherita Traywick.

Wilt ran to Morelle's left, accusing him of not adequately opposing the presidency of Donald Trump and of being too closely affiliated with the congressional Democratic leadership. Morelle responded by arguing his House committee assignments made him an effective anti-corruption advocate, and that he had successfully won funds for local infrastructure and businesses. Traywick campaigned against migrant detention centres and the 2026 Iran war, arguing that new representatives were needed to address these issues.

==== Nominee ====
- Joseph Morelle, incumbent U.S. representative

==== Eliminated in primary ====
- Sherita Traywick, pastor & candidate for New York's 56th State Senate district in 2020
- Robin Wilt, former Brighton Town Board member and candidate for this seat in 2018 and 2020

==== Endorsements ====
Joseph Morelle

Labor unions

- Communication Workers of America District 1
- Council of School Supervisors & Administrators
- New York State AFL-CIO
- New York State United Teachers

Organizations

- AIPAC
- Democratic Majority for Israel
- Planned Parenthood Action Fund

Political parties

- New York Working Families Party
Robin Wilt

Organizations

- Progressive Democrats of America
- Track AIPAC

==== Fundraising ====
Campaign finance reports as of June 3, 2025
Candidate	Raised	Spent	Cash on hand
Joseph Morelle (D)	$1,530,683	$1,558,742	$352,146
Sherita Traywick (D)	$12,188	$13,054	$2,184
Robin Wilt (D)	$40,153	$38,221	$3,882
Source: Federal Election Commission

==== Results ====
Democratic primary results
Party	Candidate	Votes	%
Democratic	Joseph Morelle (incumbent)	24,567	63.3
Democratic	Robin Wilt	11,866	30.6
Democratic	Sherita Traywick	2,332	6.0
Write-in		59	0.2
Total votes		38,824	100.0

=== Republican primary ===
==== Nominee ====
- Virginia McIntyre, Monroe County legislator

==== Endorsements ====
Virginia McIntyre

Political parties

- Conservative Party of New York State

==== Fundraising ====
Campaign finance reports as of June 3, 2026
Candidate	Raised	Spent	Cash on hand
Virginia McIntyre (R)	$26,635	$13,298	$13,337
Source: Federal Election Commission

=== Independents ===
==== Withdrawn ====
- Kloud Walton

==== Fundraising ====
Campaign finance reports as of March 31, 2026
Candidate	Raised	Spent	Cash on hand
Daelin Walton (I)	$1,711	$1,472	$414
Source: Federal Election Commission

=== General election ===
==== Predictions ====
Source	Ranking	As of
Decision Desk HQ	Safe D	July 14, 2026
The Cook Political Report	Solid D	February 6, 2025
Inside Elections	Solid D	March 7, 2025
Sabato's Crystal Ball	Safe D	September 18, 2025

==== Post-primary endorsements ====
Joseph Morelle (D)

Organizations

- U.S. Chamber of Commerce

==== Fundraising ====
Campaign finance reports as of September 30, 2026
Candidate	Raised	Spent	Cash on hand
Joseph Morelle (D)	$2,210,667	$2,058,816	$532,055
Virginia McIntyre (R)	$47,119	$45,194	$1,924
Source: Federal Election Commission

==== Results ====
2026 New York's 25th congressional district election
Party	Candidate	Votes	%	±%
Democratic	Joseph Morelle			
Working Families	Joseph Morelle			
Total	Joseph Morelle (incumbent)			
Republican	Virginia McIntyre			
Conservative	Virginia McIntyre			
Total	Virginia McIntyre			
Total votes				

== District 26 ==
2026 New York's 26th congressional district election
- Reporting: 86% as of Nov 6 at 11:37 AM EST
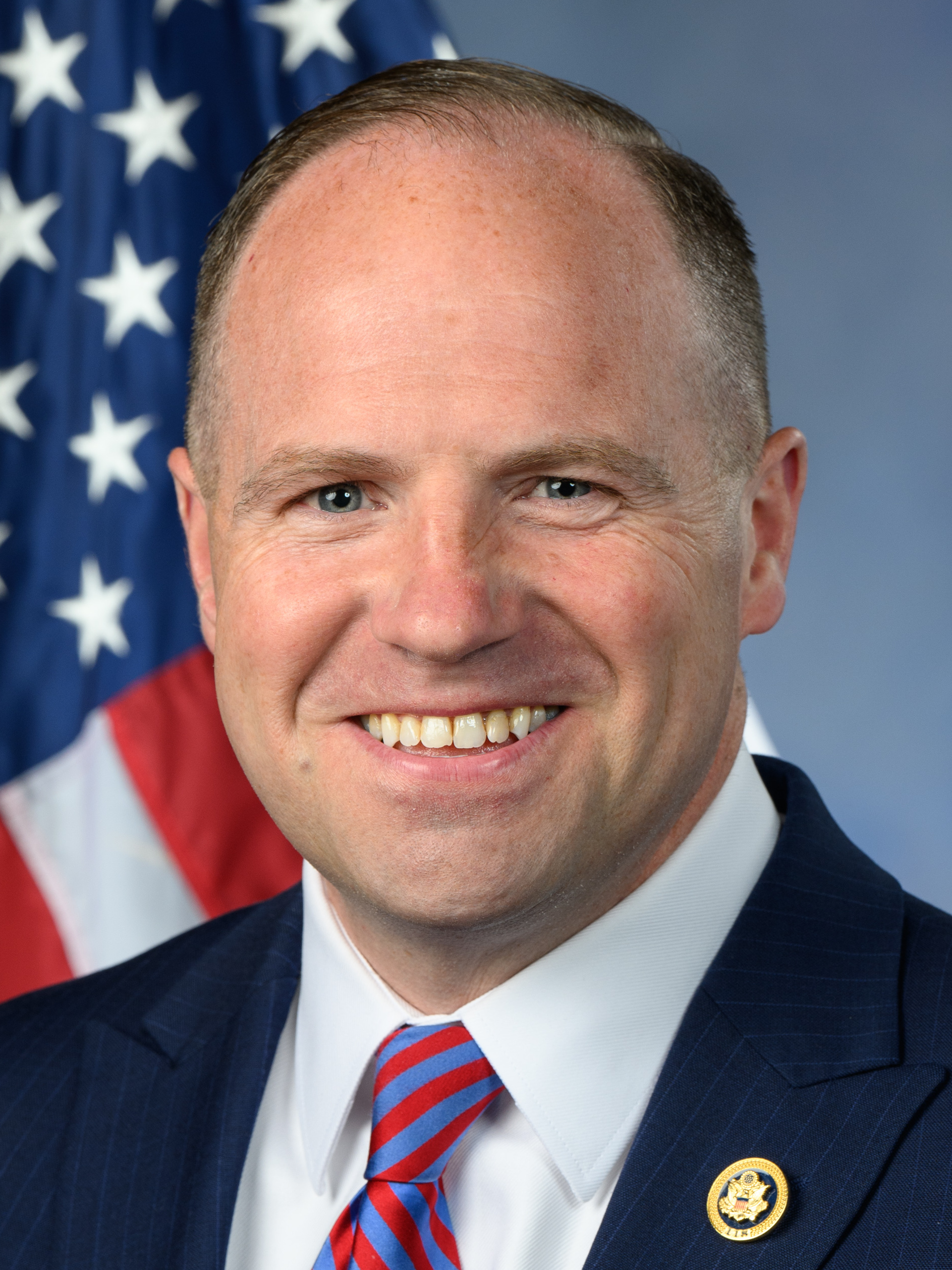

Nominee	Tim Kennedy	Dennis Hannon
Party	Democratic	Republican
Alliance		Conservative
Popular vote	163,755	84,618
Percentage	65.8%	34.0%
- County results Kennedy: 50–60% 60–70%
U.S. Representative before election
Tim Kennedy
Democratic
Elected U.S. Representative
Tim Kennedy
Democratic

The 26th district is based in the Buffalo-Niagara Falls area, including the more urban parts of Erie County and western Niagara County. The incumbent is Democrat Tim Kennedy, who was re-elected with 65.2% of the vote in 2024.

=== Democratic primary ===
==== Nominee ====
- Tim Kennedy, incumbent U.S. representative

==== Endorsements ====
Tim Kennedy

Labor unions

- Communication Workers of America District 1
- Council of School Supervisors & Administrators

Organizations

- AIPAC
- Democratic Majority for Israel
- League of Conservation Voters Action Fund
- Planned Parenthood Action Fund

Political parties

- New York Working Families Party

==== Fundraising ====
Campaign finance reports as of March 31, 2026
Candidate	Raised	Spent	Cash on hand
Tim Kennedy (D)	$2,027,438	$1,368,396	$998,106
Source: Federal Election Commission

=== Republican primary ===
==== Nominee ====
- Dennis Hannon, former construction worker

==== Endorsements ====
Dennis Hannon

Political parties

- Conservative Party of New York State

=== General election ===
==== Predictions ====
Source	Ranking	As of
Decision Desk HQ	Safe D	July 14, 2026
The Cook Political Report	Solid D	February 6, 2025
Inside Elections	Solid D	March 7, 2025
Sabato's Crystal Ball	Safe D	September 18, 2025

==== Fundraising ====
Campaign finance reports as of September 30, 2026
Candidate	Raised	Spent	Cash on hand
Tim Kennedy (D)	$2,687,395	$1,734,799	$1,291,661
Source: Federal Election Commission

==== Results ====
2026 New York's 26th congressional district election
Party	Candidate	Votes	%	±%
Democratic	Tim Kennedy (incumbent)			
Republican	Dennis Hannon			
Conservative	Dennis Hannon			
Total	Dennis Hannon			
Total votes				

== Notes ==
Partisan clients
