= 2019 New York City Public Advocate special election =

- February 26, 2019
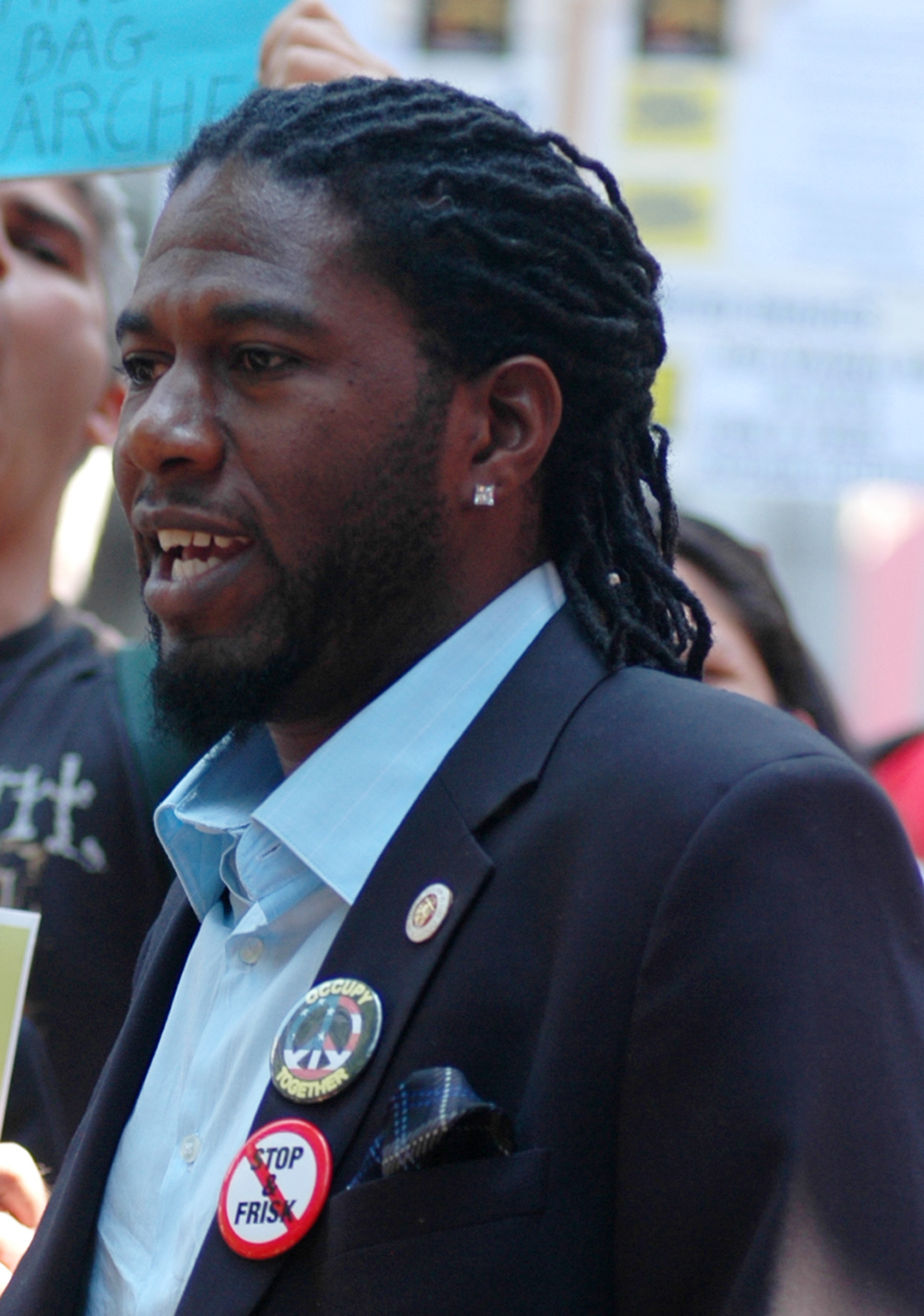

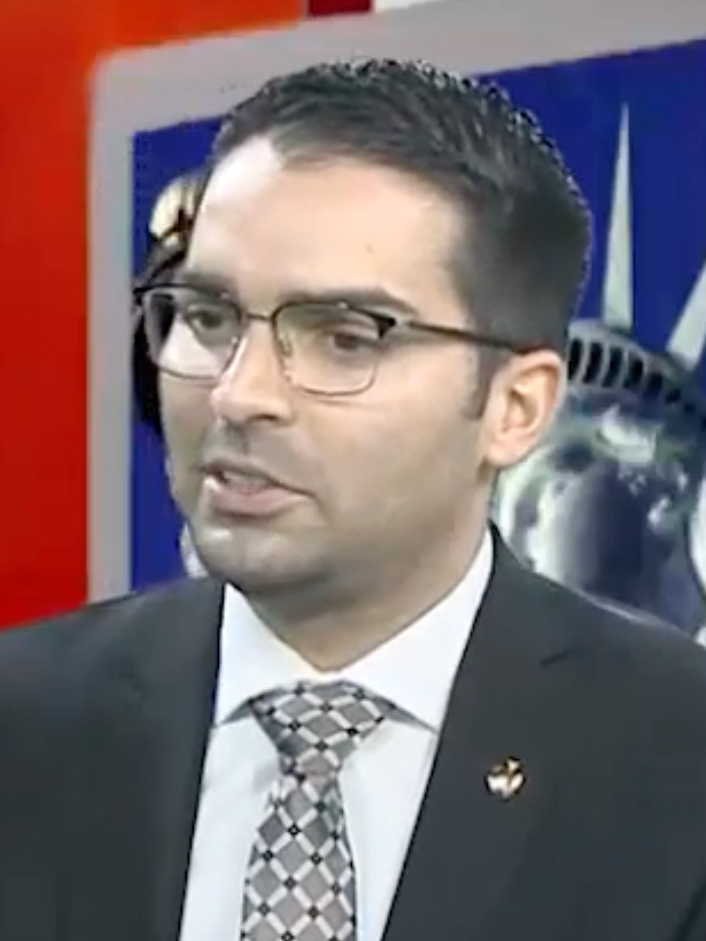

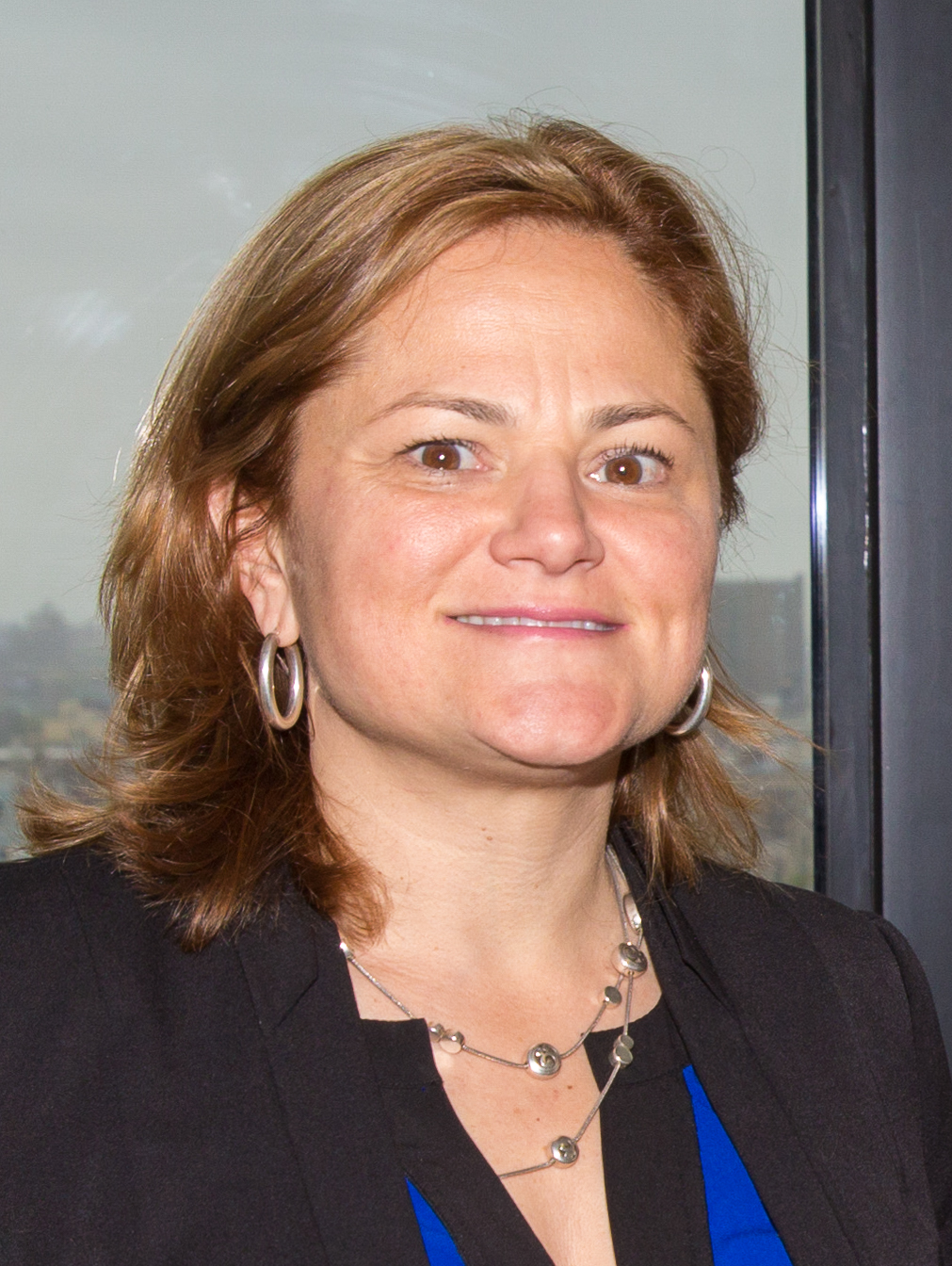

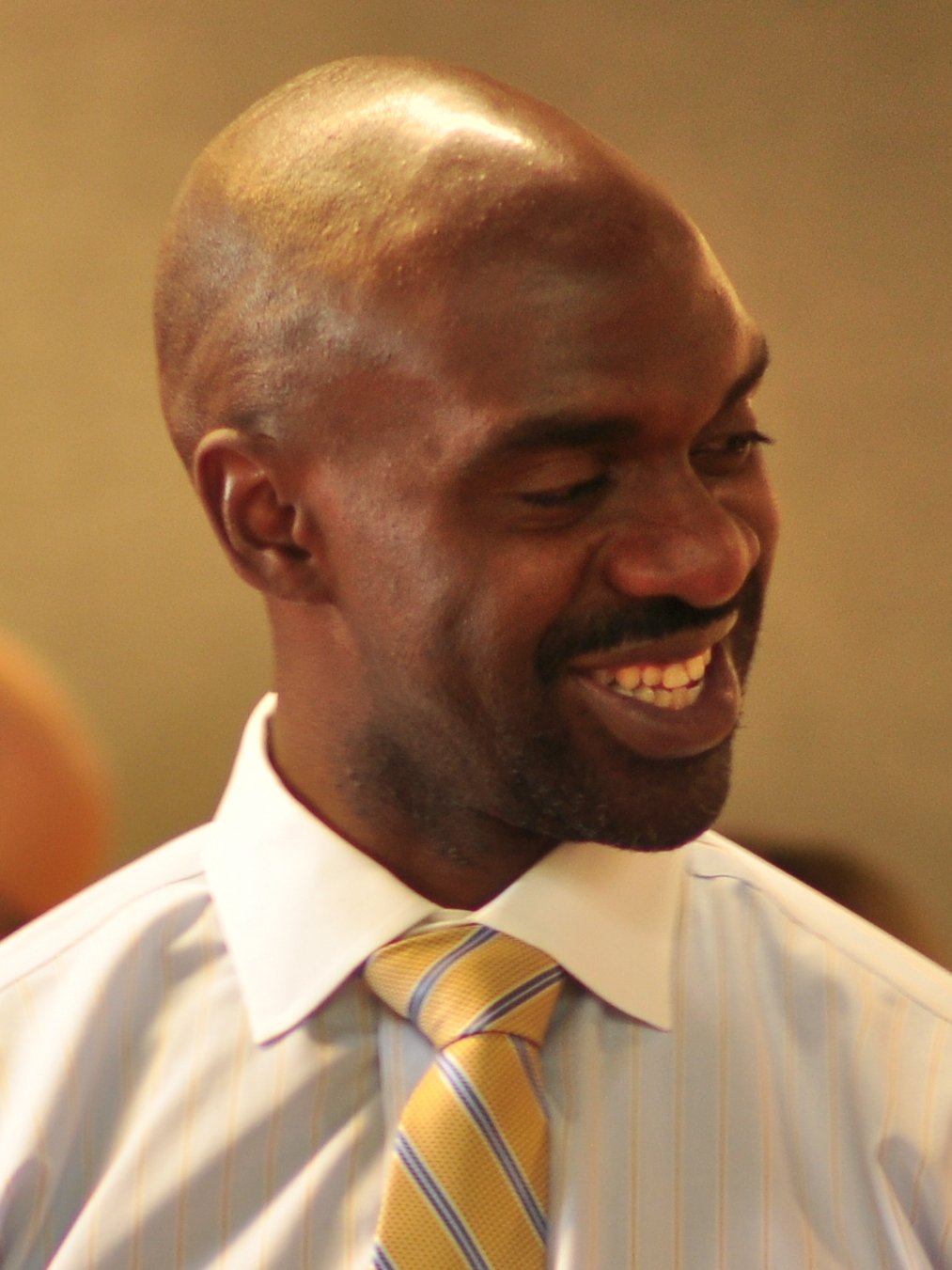

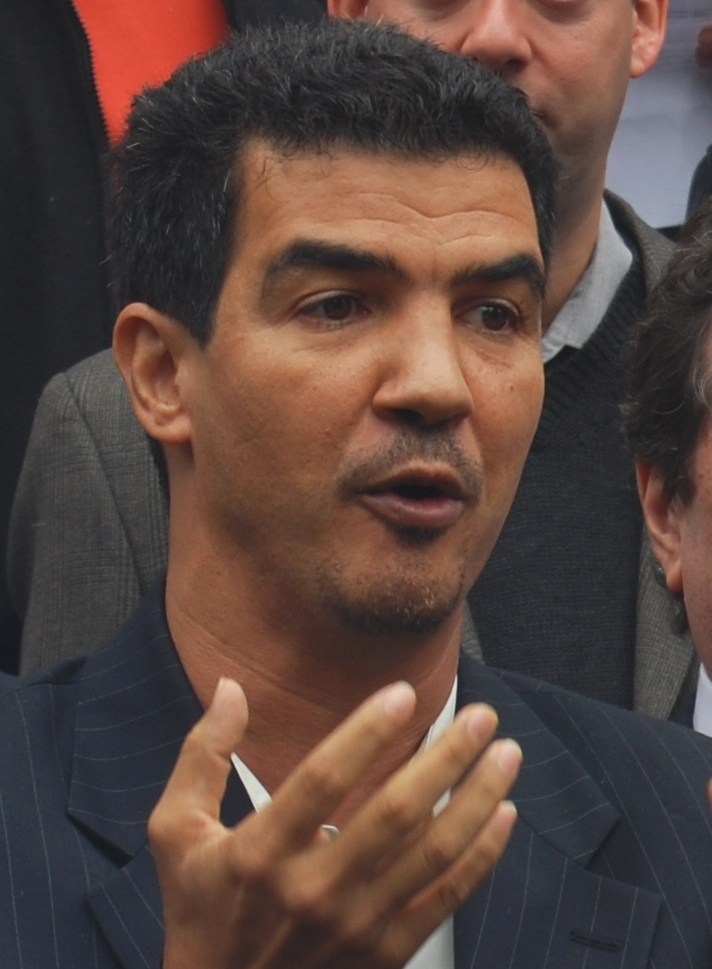
Candidate	Jumaane Williams	Eric Ulrich	Melissa Mark-Viverito
Party	It's Time Let's Go	Common Sense	Fix the MTA
Popular vote	133,809	77,026	44,158
Percentage	33.2%	19.1%	11.0%
Candidate	Michael Blake	Ydanis Rodriguez
Party	For the People	Independent
Popular vote	33,198	24,266
Percentage	8.2%	6.0%
- Williams: 20–30% 30–40% 40–50% 50–60% 60–70% 80–90% Ulrich: 20–30% 30–40% 40–50% 50–60% 60–70% 70–80% 80–90% Mark-Viverito: 10–20% 20–30% 30–40% Blake: 20–30% 40–50% Rodriguez: 20–30% 30–40% 40–50% Kim: 30–40% Williams: 20–30% 30–40% 40–50% 50–60% 60–70% 80–90% Ulrich: 20–30% 30–40% 40–50% 50–60% 60–70% 70–80% 80–90% Mark-Viverito: 10–20% 20–30% 30–40% Blake: 20–30% 40–50% Rodriguez: 20–30% 30–40% 40–50% Kim: 30–40% Williams: 20–30% 30–40% 40–50% 50–60% 60–70% 80–90% Ulrich: 20–30% 30–40% 40–50% 50–60% 60–70% 70–80% 80–90% Mark-Viverito: 10–20% 20–30% 30–40% Blake: 20–30% 40–50% Rodriguez: 20–30% 30–40% 40–50% Kim: 30–40% Williams: 10–20% 20–30% 30–40% 40–50% 50–60% 60–70% 70–80% 80–90% >90% Ulrich: 10–20% 20–30% 30–40% 40–50% 50–60% 60–70% 70–80% 80–90% >90% Mark-Viverito: 10–20% 20–30% 30–40% 40–50% 50–60% Blake: 10–20% 20–30% 30–40% 40–50% 50–60% 60–70% Rodriguez: 10–20% 20–30% 30–40% 40–50% 50–60% 60–70% Espinal: 20–30% 30–40% 40–50% 50–60% 60–70% 70–80% O'Donnell: 30–40% 40–50% Kim: 10–20% 20–30% 30–40% 40–50% 50–60% 60–70% Yee: 20–30% 30–40% 40–50% 50–60% 60–70% Konst: 20–30% Sheik: 10–20% 20–30% 30–40% 40–50% 50–60% 60–70% Alicandro: >90% Herbert: 20–30% Walker: 20–30% Tie: <30% 30–40% 40–50% 50% No votes
Public Advocate before election
Letitia James
Democratic
Elected Public Advocate
Jumaane Williams
Democratic

The 2019 New York City Public Advocate special election was held on February 26, 2019, to fill part of the unexpired term of Letitia James's vacated seat as New York City Public Advocate. It was triggered on January 1, 2019, when James resigned to take office as Attorney General of New York.

By statute, New York City Council Speaker Corey Johnson served as acting Public Advocate for the time between James’ resignation and the inauguration of Jumaane Williams, who won the election.

As with all special elections in New York City, it was officially nonpartisan, and candidates who file for the race had to create a unique party line that will be displayed on the ballot. A partisan primary and a November general election were held later in 2019 to complete the remaining years of James' term.

As of 2026, this is the last time a Republican won Queens County.

== Candidates ==
=== Declared ===
Following ballot petition challenges and appeals, the Board of Elections certified the subsequent list of candidates that are in chronological order of petition filings, along with their unique party lines, who appeared on the ballot in this sequence:

- Melissa Mark-Viverito (Fix the MTA), former Democratic Speaker of the New York City Council
- Michael Blake (For The People), Democratic New York State Assemblymember and a Vice Chair of the Democratic National Committee
- Dawn Smalls (No More Delays), attorney
- Eric Ulrich (Common Sense), Republican New York City Councilmember
- Ydanis Rodríguez (Unite Immigrants), Democratic New York City Councilmember
- Danny O'Donnell (Equality For All), Democratic New York State Assemblymember
- Rafael Espinal (Livable City), Democratic New York City Councilmember and former State Assemblymember
- Latrice Walker § (Power Forward), Democratic New York State Assemblymember
- Jumaane Williams (It's Time Let's Go), Democratic New York City Councilmember and candidate for Lieutenant Governor in 2018
- Ron Kim (No Amazon), Democratic New York State Assemblymember
- Benjamin Yee (Community Strong), activist
- Manny Alicandro (Better Leaders), lawyer
- Nomiki Konst (Pay Folks More), activist and journalist
- David Eisenbach (Stop REBNY), professor and Democratic candidate for Public Advocate in 2017
- Jared Rich (Jared Rich for NYC), attorney
- Anthony Herbert (Residents First), activist
- Helal Skeikh (Friends of Helal), former Democratic City Council candidate

=== Disqualified ===
- Theo Chino, bitcoin entrepreneur
- Ifeoma Ike (Bring a chair), activist
- Walter Iwachiw, perennial candidate
- Abbey Laurel-Smith, artist
- Danniel Maio, business owner
- Gary Popkin, professor
- Michael Zumbluskas, activist

=== Declined ===
- Chirlane McCray, First Lady of New York City
- Christine Quinn, former Speaker of the New York City Council

§ Indicates candidate has withdrawn from race but will still appear on ballot

== Campaign ==
Speculation about a possible special election began before incumbent Tish James had won the Democratic primary for the office of New York Attorney General, with former speakers of the New York City Council Christine Quinn and Melissa Mark-Viverito being mentioned by the Gotham Gazette as potential frontrunners. Of the two, Quinn was considered a moderate Democrat, while Mark-Viverito was seen as being on the left of the party. Republican city councillor Joe Borelli was also considered a likely candidate, as the almost certainly numerous Democratic field was considered to have the potential to divide the vote enough for a Republican to win, despite New York City's heavily Democratic lean. James proceeded to win the attorney general primary, creating an almost certain opening for the Public Advocate seat. The results of the statewide Democratic primaries that year created another frontrunner for the race, New York City councillor Jumaane Williams, who had narrowly lost the Democratic primary for Lieutenant Governor of New York, but had performed well in New York City, especially in Brooklyn.

The first candidate to enter the race was activist Nomiki Konst on September 27, 2018. Konst, a democratic socialist, announced an intent to run as an outsider. State assemblyman Michael Blake entered the race on October 19, and Williams announced his candidacy four days later. Williams was considered to be a staunchly left-wing Democrat, granting him potential support from the powerful progressive movement in the city, and his declaration that he would not run for Mayor of New York City in 2021 was thought to potentially allow him to win the support of prospective mayoral contenders. However, Williams' past socially conservative statements were considered a potential liability of his, in spite of his repudiation of said statements. City councillor Eric Ulrich eventually emerged as the strongest Republican candidate. A moderate Republican, Ulrich declared that he was "Pro-choice and Pro-Labor rights", and it was considered possible for him to win support from moderate Democrats, but his opposition to President Donald Trump was considered likely to depress Republican turnout. Mark-Viverito entered the race on November 27. Several other candidates entered the race over the course of late 2018, such as State assemblymen Daniel O'Donnell and Ron Kim, as well as City councillors Rafael Espinal and Ydanis Rodriguez. Of these candidates, O'Donnell was considered to have an asset in that his assembly district was highly affluent and had a reputation for high voter turnout.

A total of 17 candidates had their petitions to get on the ballot approved by the Board of Elections. Originally, only 16 candidates were approved, but an appeal by minor candidate Helal Shiekh was successful and he was placed on the ballot. The large field of candidates, featuring several prominent politicians, divided the New York City Council, with few members making endorsements as they had good relations with several different candidates. In December 2018, several ballot initiatives were passed in New York City that made it substantially easier for candidates to publicly finance their campaigns. This development was viewed as harming Mark-Viverito's campaign, as under the old financing rules she had had a large fundraising advantage over all other candidates, due to her several high-profile campaigns for the City Council. Mark-Viverito's campaign also suffered from many left-wing groups, which had previously supported her, becoming disillusioned with her as a result of her tenure as City council speaker, where she had compromised on reforming the New York Police Department and had closely collaborated with Mayor Bill de Blasio on controversial rezoning decisions.

The issues of Amazon potentially opening a large headquarters in New York and the mayoralty of de Blasio were both highly prevalent among the campaigns. Most candidates vocally opposed Amazon's plan, with Ulrich being the only exception. Most candidates also strongly criticised de Blasio's policies on housing rezoning and his pro-Amazon actions, and especially criticised his plans to run for President of the United States. As the campaign progressed, Williams and Mark-Viverito emerged as the only candidates with a realistic shot at winning the election, though Blake was regarded as being third in the race and having an outside chance at winning. Williams' campaign suffered from numerous controversies, such as allegations that he had not dealt with abusive behaviour within his campaign staff and revelations that he had received 27 speeding violations in school zones, but these controversies were noted as having surprisingly little effect on his popularity.

=== Debates ===
2019 New York City Public Advocate special election debates
No.	Date & Time	Host	Moderator	Link	Participants									
Key: P Participant A Absent N Non-invitee O Out of race														
Key: P Participant A Absent N Non-invitee O Out of race					Michael Blake	Rafael Espinal	Ron Kim	Nomiki Konst	Melissa Mark-Viverito	Daniel O'Donnell	Ydanis Rodriguez	Dawn Smalls	Eric Ulrich	Jumaane Williams
1	November 14, 2018	Citizens Union	Ben Max	Video	P	P	O	P	O	P	O	P	P	P
2	February 6, 2019	NY1; Politico New York	Errol Louis; Laura Nahmias; Grace Rauh	Video	P	P	P	P	P	P	P	P	P	P
3	February 21, 2019	NY1	Errol Louis	Video	P	P	P	P	P	N	N	P	N	P

=== Endorsements ===
Michael Blake

Federal officials

- Eliot Engel, U.S. Representative from NY-16
- Gregory Meeks, U.S. Representative from NY-05
- José E. Serrano, U.S. Representative from NY-15

State officials

- Carmen E. Arroyo, State assemblymember
- Jamaal Bailey, State senator
- Jeffrion Aubry, State assemblemember
- Jeffrey Dinowitz, State assemblymember
- Nathalia Fernandez, State assemblymember
- Alicia Hyndman, State assemblymember
- Carl McCall, former New York State Comptroller
- Victor M. Pichardo, State assemblymember
- Dick Ravitch, former Lieutenant Governor of New York
- Jose Rivera, State assemblymember
- Robert J. Rodriguez, State assemblymember
- Rebecca Seawright, State assemblymember
- Luis R. Sepúlveda, State senator
- Michele Titus, State assemblymember
- Tremaine Wright, State assemblymember

Local officials

- Justin Brannan, NYC Councillor
- Mark Gjonaj, NYC Councillor
- Donovan Richards, NYC Councillor
- Rafael Salamanca, NYC Councillor
- Ritchie Torres, NYC Councillor

Individuals

- Maya Wiley, The New School professor

Labor unions

- DC 37
- International Union of Bricklayers and Allied Craftworkers Local 7

Organizations

- Citizens Union
Rafael Espinal

Local officials

- Stephen Levin, NYC Councillor

Individuals

- Darren Aronofsky, director
- Lance Bass, musician
- Marky Ramone, musician
- Lauren Singer, activist
- Zalman Teitelbaum, rabbi

Labor unions

- Freelancers Union
- International Brotherhood of Teamsters Council 16

Organizations

- Liberal Party of New York

Newspapers and publications

- Der Yid
Ron Kim

State officials

- Peter Abbate, State assemblymember
- Yuh-Line Niou, State assemblymember
- Dan Quart, State assemblymember

Local officials

- Paul Vallone, NYC Councillor
Nomiki Konst

Federal officials

- Ro Khanna, U.S. Representative from CA-17

Local officials

- Costa Constantinides, NYC Councillor

Individuals

- Rosario Dawson, actress
- Susan Sarandon, actress and activist
Melissa Mark-Viverito

Federal officials

- Adriano Espaillat, U.S. Representative from NY-13

State officials

- Catalina Cruz, State assemblywoman

Local officials

- Diana Ayala, NYC Councillor
- Margaret Chin, NYC Councillor
- Andrew Cohen, NYC Councillor
- Mark Levine, NYC Councillor

Labor unions

- National Association of Social Workers

Organizations

- National Organization for Women
- Vulcan Society

Newspapers and publications

- El Diario La Prensa
Daniel O'Donnell

Federal officials

- Joe Crowley, former U.S. Representative from NY-14
- Charles Rangel, former U.S. Representative from NY-13

State officials

- Michael Benedetto, state assemblymember
- Michael Cusick, state assemblymember
- Maritza Davila, state assemblymember
- Deborah Glick, state assemblymember
- Robert Jackson, state senator
- Liz Krueger, former state senator
- Franz S. Leichter, former state senator
- Catherine Nolan, state assemblymember
- Edward C. Sullivan, former state assemblymember
- Keith L. T. Wright, former state assemblymember

Individuals

- Rosie O'Donnell, actress

Organizations

- LGBTQ Victory Fund
- Stonewall Democrats of New York City
Ydanis Rodriguez

Local officials

- Fernando Cabrera, NYC Councilman
- Rubén Díaz Sr., NYC Councilman

Individuals

- Federico Antún Batlle, chairman of the Social Christian Reformist Party
Dawn Smalls

Executive officials

- Kathleen Sebelius, former U.S. Secretary of Health and Human Services
Eric Ulrich

Local officials

- Robert Holden, NYC Councilman

Newspapers and publications

- New York Daily News
- New York Post
- Queens Chronicle
Latrice Walker

Federal officials

- Yvette Clarke, U.S. Representative from NY-11

Local officials

- Alicka Ampry-Samuel, NYC Councilwoman
Jumaane Williams

State officials

- Kevin Parker, state senator
- Rodneyse Bichotte, state assemblymember
- Vivian Cook, state assemblymember
- Mathylde Frontus, state assemblymember
- Walter T. Mosley, state assemblymember
- Roxanne Persaud, state senator
- Diana Richardson, state assemblymember
- Julia Salazar, state senator
- James Sanders Jr., state senator
- Al Taylor, state assemblymember
- Helene Weinstein, state assemblymember
- Jaime Williams, state assemblymember

Local officials

- Gale Brewer, Manhattan Borough President
- Laurie Cumbo, NYC Councillor
- Vanessa Gibson, NYC Councillor
- Mark Green, former NYC Public Advocate
- Ben Kallos, NYC Councillor
- Andy King, NYC Councillor
- Brad Lander, NYC Councillor
- Daneek Miller, NYC Councillor
- Antonio Reynoso, NYC Councillor
- Jimmy Van Bramer, NYC Councillor

Individuals

- Alyssa Milano, actress
- Cynthia Nixon, actress and Candidate for Governor of New York in 2018
- Zephyr Teachout, activist and Candidate for Governor of New York in 2014

Labor unions

- Professional Staff Congress
- International Association of Sheet Metal, Air, Rail and Transportation Workers Local 28

Organizations

- Citizen Action
- Indivisible movement Brooklyn
- Jim Owles Liberal Democratic Club
- New York Communities for Change
- Working Families Party

Newspapers and publications

- The New York Times
Ben Yee

Organizations

- Indivisible Queens

== Results ==
2019 New York City Public Advocate election results
Party	Candidate	Votes	%
Democratic	Jumaane Williams	133,809	33.2
Republican	Eric Ulrich	77,026	19.1
Democratic	Melissa Mark-Viverito	44,158	10.9
Democratic	Michael Blake	33,198	8.2
Democratic	Ydanis Rodriguez	24,266	6.0
Nonpartisan	Dawn Smalls	16,522	4.1
Democratic	Rafael Espinal	12,929	3.2
Democratic	Daniel J. O'Donnell	11,477	2.85
Democratic	Ron Kim	11,434	2.84
Nonpartisan	Benjamin Yee	10,390	2.5
Democratic	Nomiki Konst	9,339	2.3
Democratic	Helal Sheik	5,179	1.2
Democratic	David Eisenbach	3,200	0.79
Nonpartisan	A. Manny Alicandro	3,002	0.75
Nonpartisan	Anthony Herbert	2,918	0.72
Democratic	Latrice Walker §	2,282	0.57
Nonpartisan	Jared Rich	938	0.23
Nonpartisan	Write-ins	711	0.18
Democratic hold			
Total votes		402,778	100

=== Analysis ===
Eli Valentin of the Gotham Gazette noted that Mark-Viverito had failed to win support from Latino voters that had been expected to back her campaign, which he attributed to both the presence of other Latino candidates in the race in the form of Rodriguez and Espinal, as well as Williams' surprisingly strong performance among Latino voters. Williams' margin of victory was considered surprisingly large.
