= 2019 New York City ballot proposals =

Five citywide ballot proposals appeared on the general election ballot in New York City on November 5, 2019. Proposals 2, 3, 4, and 5, which would amend the city's charter, were developed by New York City's Charter Revision Commission, a recently created body. All five proposals passed.

== Proposal 1 ==
Proposal 1 amends the City Charter to "give voters the choice of ranking up to five candidates in primary and special elections for mayor, public advocate, comptroller, borough president, and city council beginning in January 2021". In addition, Question 1 would increase the time between a city office vacancy and the special election to fill it from 45 days (60 for mayor) to 80 days, and change the timeline for city council redistricting to complete it prior to city council nominating petition signature collection. This proposal passed.

The first election in the city to use ranked-choice voting (instant-runoff voting) was in the 24th council district in Queens, which took place on February 2, 2021. The first regular elections to use ranked-choice voting for mayor, public advocate, comptroller, borough president, and city council were in 2021.

== Proposal 2 ==
Proposal 2 concerns the New York City Civilian Complaint Review Board. First, it adds two members to the board, bringing the total to 15. One new member would be appointed by the Public Advocate, and one would be chosen by the mayor and City Council Speaker. The proposal also would allow the Council to directly appoint CCRB members instead of waiting on the mayor's appointment. It also expands its powers to independently investigate and recommend discipline for officers. This proposal passed.

== Proposal 3 ==
Proposal 3 concerns the New York City Conflicts of Interest Board. Members of the board would have their ability to participate in political campaigning restricted, while also limiting the amount they could donate to political campaigns. Two of the mayor's selections for the board would be transferred to the city comptroller and Public Advocate. It also extends the ban on city elected officials and senior appointed employees lobbying the agency they worked for from one to two years. This proposal passed.

== Proposal 4 ==
Proposal 4 concerns the city budget. It authorizes a formal rainy-day fund to go into effect, sets minimum Public Advocate and Borough President budgets based on the 2020 fiscal year adjusted based on inflation or the total change in the city's total budget, and moves the deadline for the mayor's revenue report to the city council from June 5 to April 26, and sets a deadline of 30 days for the mayor to submit changes to the city's financial plan. This proposal passed.

== Proposal 5 ==
Proposal 5 concerns the Uniform Land Use Review Procedure. It would make the proposals to be more easily accessible before public review, and for a detailed project summary to be sent to the area's borough president, borough board, and community board, as well as to be posted online, at least 30 days before the application is certified for public review. The proposal also extends the time, between 75 and 90 days, for community boards to review applications. This proposal passed.
