= Ron Kim (politician) =

American politician (born 1979)

Member of the New York State Assembly from the 40th district
- Incumbent
- Assumed office January 1, 2013
- Preceded by: Grace Meng

Personal details
- Born: May 2, 1979 (age 47) South Korea
- Party: Democratic
- Spouse: Alison Tan
- Education: Hamilton College (BA); Baruch College (MPA)
- Website: State Assembly website

Korean name
- Hangul: 김태석
- Hanja: 金兌錫
- RR: Gim Taeseok
- MR: Kim T'aesŏk

Ronald Tae Sok Kim (born May 2, 1979) is an American politician serving as a member of the New York State Assembly from the 40th District since 2013. His district covers the communities of Whitestone, Flushing, College Point, and Murray Hill in northeast Queens. Kim was the first ever Korean American elected to office in New York.

== Early life and education ==
Kim is Korean American, and his family immigrated to Queens when he was seven. The only child of Seo Jun Kim and Sun Hee Kim, he grew up in Flushing, Queens. He graduated from the Riverdale Country Day School in the Bronx in 1997, where he was captain of the football and track teams. He earned a Bachelor of Arts degree in government and political science at Hamilton College, where he continued his football career on the varsity team, and later received his Masters in Public Administration from Baruch College as part of the National Urban Fellows Program.

== Career ==
Kim began his career in public service in then-Councilmember John Liu’s office, focusing on quality-of-life issues in the Flushing community. He moved on to become an aide to then-State Assemblyman Mark Weprin. Following that, Kim joined the New York State Department of Buildings, and then the Department of Small Business Services. In 2004, Kim was accepted into the National Urban Fellows Program, where he was placed in a fellowship advising the Chief Education Office of the Chicago Public Schools while simultaneously earning his MPA from Baruch College.

In 2006, Kim joined the staff of then-New York City Council Speaker Christine Quinn as a Policy Analyst, where he focused on legislative issues relating to transportation, infrastructure, and economic development.

From 2007 through 2010, Kim served as a Regional Director for Government and Community Affairs in the administrations of Governors Eliot Spitzer and David A. Paterson.

After leaving his position at the Governor’s office, Kim worked at the Parkside Group where he advocated on behalf of children with special needs, small business, community organizations, and vulnerable New Yorkers.

In June of 2012, Kim announced that he would seek the State Assembly seat being vacated by Grace Meng, who was running for the U.S. House of Representatives. Kim won the five-way Democratic primary on September 13, and went on to defeat Republican Philip Gim in the general election, 68% to 32%.

On December 10, 2018, Kim announced that he would be seeking the New York City Public Advocate seat being vacated by Letitia James, who had been elected New York State Attorney General. Running on a plan to end corporate welfare in what The Villager described as "one of the most jam-packed elections in recent memory," he and over a dozen other candidates entered a crowded race eventually won by then-Councilmember Jumaane Williams.

He endorsed Bernie Sanders for the 2020 Democratic Party presidential primaries. In 2021, he endorsed Andrew Yang for mayor of New York City. During the 2024 New York State primary election, Kim stated that "[t]here were clear patterns of foreign influence trying to dictate the outcome of the election — groups with ties to mainland China and the CCP. They were trying to steal the Flushing seat." Kim has spoken out against CCP influence operations in American elections.

=== State Assembly ===
In his first month in office, Kim helped pass legislation (A.3354) implementing tax relief for New York City homeowners; the bill was projected to encourage housing development. In January of 2013, he became a proponent of the Taxi Drivers Protection Act following the robbery and assault of a driver in New York City. He has introduced and advocated for bills related to education and services for older adults, and is an active supporter on immigration issues, having cosponsored the New York State version of the DREAM Act. He was the prime sponsor of the bill to make Lunar New Year an allowable school holiday in New York City when the measure was adopted by then-Mayor Bill de Blasio.

Kim currently chairs the Committee on Tourism, Parks, Arts and Sports Development and is a member of the: Education Committee; Corporations, Authorities and Commissions Committee; Governmental Operations Committee; and Housing Committee. He is the co-founder of the New York State Asian Pacific American Task Force, and a member of the Black, Puerto Rican, Hispanic and Asian Caucus.

==== Tackling corporate subsidies and public debt ====
Kim was the first public official to publicly denounce and lead the opposition against Amazon HQ2 and to speak out against providing taxpayer-funded incentives to lure Amazon to New York City. His policy stance led to a larger discussion around corporate subsidies, economic development, and the rate of return for such investments.

In October of 2018, he authored a white paper called "Gut-Checking Democracy" in which he outlined his thesis on the topic and presented several policy solutions. In that same month, he organized more than 20 labor groups, nonprofits and community leaders to call for a one-time cancellation of student debt, and outlined the economic rationale and financial mechanisms for how it could be executed. His legislative record as an Assemblyman reflects this philosophy.

On November 9, 2018, he and Professor Zephyr Teachout published an op-ed in The New York Times which warned of the consequences of locating a big corporation like Amazon in New York. He went on to lead the #PeopleOverCorporations agenda, calling for an end to corporate welfare and repurposing of taxpayers' money to liberate New Yorkers from a lifetime of debt.

==== Small business advocacy ====
Kim has worked with state legislators to pass a bill expanding access to small loans and seed funding for micro-businesses, and sought to create a fund in the 2017 State Budget to help small businesses in New York struggling to comply with increasingly burdensome regulations.

He has introduced legislation to create an entity within the New York State Department of Financial Services called the "State Office of Financial Services for Immigrants." The purpose of the office would be to foster financial literacy among recent immigrant communities; assist recent immigrants with navigating mainstream financial institutions as they seek to borrow, lend or invest; and help recent immigrants build their credit score and history. Kim has also introduced legislation to create the first-in-the-nation Office of Financial Resilience, which would work to reverse the spiraling cycle of debt under which so many New York families are living.

==== Nail salon law ====
In the summer of 2015, following an investigative report by The New York Times, Kim helped to draft a measure to improve the conditions in the nail salon industry. The law that Kim passed created a trainee nail specialist program and modified the Secretary of State's enforcement of licensing requirements. Soon after, however, Governor Andrew Cuomo called a state of emergency and unilaterally implemented other requirements, such as wage bonds for nail salons, that were not part of the new law. These additional requirements caused excessive hardships for small business owners in the industry, and many of them were forced to close their stores. Kim spoke out against the new unilateral mandates imposed by the governor, which were not part of the law their offices had worked on and agreed to. He subsequently introduced and became the primary sponsor of a bill to relieve the financial and economic burdens that small business owners, including those in the nail salon industry, were facing. As a result of his efforts, that bill passed both houses of the New York State Legislature, but the governor refused to sign it.

In November 2015, The New York Times initially published a report claiming Kim had changed positions on the nail salon issue as a result of campaign contributions, which he vigorously countered in a letter to the Times. Reason and Crain's New York Business each published stories examining the record and refuting the Times allegation that Kim had changed his position. In December 2015, the New York Times made a correction, stating that its report "included incorrect information about some political donations to Mr. Kim from the industry."

After the publication of The New York Times' nail salon investigative report, the validity of its claims about the industry soon came into doubt. Amid increased scrutiny, the accuracy of its reporting on nail salons was challenged by several media outlets. Richard Bernstein, a former New York Times reporter, expressed serious doubts about its claims of widespread abuses and "astonishingly low" wages, and showed that its translation and understanding of job ads in the industry, one of its key pieces of evidence, were either inaccurate or false. In October 2015, Reason published a three part re-reporting of the story by Jim Epstein, charging that the New York Times' series was filled with misquotes and factual errors with respect to both its claims of illegally low wages and of health hazards. In November 2015, the Times public editor concluded that the Times' exposé's "findings, and the language used to express them, should have been dialed back — in some instances substantially" and recommended that "The Times writer further follow-up stories, including some that re-examine its original findings and that take on the criticism from salon owners and others — not defensively but with an open mind."

==== Criticism of Andrew Cuomo ====
During the height of the COVID-19 pandemic in New York, Kim met with and helped constituents and concerned New Yorkers whose loved ones were trapped in nursing homes and vulnerable to COVID. Many of the patients were older adults who ultimately died from the disease. In that same time period, his own uncle passed away in a nursing home. His work on the issue helped reveal the dire state of patient safety and COVID mortality rates for nursing homes in New York, which eventually led to him and others uncovering the New York COVID-19 nursing home scandal. He was one of the few elected Democrats at the time who criticized the then-Governor Cuomo’s handling of infections in nursing homes, and Kim questioned the Cuomo administration's inaccurate reporting of COVID nursing home death rates. In the days that followed, Cuomo directly called Kim and berated, yelled, and threatened him, saying he would "destroy" Kim if he did not agree to retract or change his statements.

== Personal life ==
Kim and his wife, Alison Tan, reside with their three daughters in Flushing, Queens.

On September 17, 2015, Kim tackled an alleged purse-snatcher, Daniel Fish, to the ground while walking to his office. He broke his own glasses as he took down and held the suspect until police arrived and arrested him.

== See also ==
- Korean Americans in New York City
- Koreatown, Long Island
