= New York's 79th State Assembly district =

American legislative district

Assemblymember
Chantel Jackson; D–Morrisania

New York's 79th State Assembly district is one of the 150 districts in the New York State Assembly. It has been represented by Democrat Chantel Jackson since 2021.

== Geography ==
=== 2020s ===
District 79 is in The Bronx. It comprises the neighborhoods of Claremont and Morrisania and portions of the neighborhoods of Melrose, Longwood, Crotona Park East and East Tremont, including Crotona Park proper.

The district is overlapped (partially) by New York's 14th and 15th congressional districts, as well as the 29th and 32nd districts of the New York State Senate and the 15th, 16th and 17th districts of the New York City Council.

=== 2010s ===
District 79 is in The Bronx. It comprises the neighborhoods of Morrisania, Melrose, Belmont, Claremont and East Tremont, including Crotona Park.

== Recent election results ==
=== 2026 ===
2026 New York State Assembly election, District 79
Party	Candidate	Votes	%
Democratic	Chantel Jackson (incumbent)		
Conservative	Emmanuel Findlay Jr.		
Write-in			
Total votes			100.0

=== 2024 ===
2024 New York State Assembly election, District 79
Party	Candidate	Votes	%
Democratic	Chantel Jackson (incumbent)	20,585	80.1
Republican	Sharon Darby	4,238	16.5
Conservative	Emmanuel Findlay Jr.	841	3.3
Write-in		39	0.1
Total votes		25,703	100.0
Democratic hold			

=== 2022 ===
2022 New York State Assembly election, District 79
Party	Candidate	Votes	%
Democratic	Chantel Jackson (incumbent)	10,957	87.1
Republican	Gregory Torres	1,616	12.9
Write-in		12	0.0
Total votes		12,585	100
Democratic hold			

=== 2020 ===
2020 New York State Assembly election, District 79
Primary election
Party	Candidate	Votes	%
Democratic	Chantel Jackson	2,944	25.9
Democratic	Cynthia Cox	2,599	22.9
Democratic	George Alvarez	2,456	21.6
Democratic	Elvis Santana	1,536	13.5
Democratic	Eric Stevenson	1,383	12.2
Democratic	Dion Powell	410	3.6
Write-in		25	0.3
Total votes		11,353	100.0
General election
Democratic	Chantel Jackson	33,008	89.8
Republican	Donald Skinner	3,014	8.2
Conservative	Dion Powell	682	1.9
Write-in		57	0.1
Total votes		36,761	100.0
Democratic hold			

=== 2018 ===
2018 New York State Assembly election, District 79
Party	Candidate	Votes	%
Democratic	Michael Blake	23,772	
Working Families	Michael Blake	448	
Total	Michael Blake (incumbent)	24,220	96.4
Republican	Gregory Torres	752	3.0
Conservative	Margaret Fasano	145	0.6
Write-in		6	0.0
Total votes		25,123	100
Democratic hold			

=== 2016 ===
2016 New York State Assembly election, District 79
Party	Candidate	Votes	%
Democratic	Michael Blake	29,736	
Working Families	Michael Blake	662	
Total	Michael Blake (incumbent)	30,038	98.3
Conservative	Selsia Evans	512	1.7
Write-in		14	0.0
Total votes		30,564	100
Democratic hold			

=== 2014 ===
2014 New York State Assembly election, District 79
Primary election
Party	Candidate	Votes	%
Democratic	Michael Blake	1,929	37.2
Democratic	Marsha Michael	1,300	25.1
Democratic	George Alvarez	1,173	22.6
Democratic	Raul Rodriguez	454	8.8
Democratic	Lanita Jones	251	4.8
Democratic	Frederick Ricks	67	1.3
Write-in		10	0.2
Total votes		5,184	100.0
General election
Democratic	Michael Blake	9,835	
Working Families	Michael Blake	515	
Total	Michael Blake	10,350	96.5
Republican	Selsia Evans	294	
Conservative	Selsia Evans	78	
Total	Selsia Evans	372	3.5
Write-in		8	0.0
Total votes		10,730	100
Democratic hold			

=== 2012 ===
2012 New York State Assembly election, District 79
Party	Candidate	Votes	%
Democratic	Eric Stevenson	27,436	
Republican	Eric Stevenson	435	
Working Families	Eric Stevenson	354	
Total	Eric Stevenson (incumbent)	28,225	97.0
Independence	Jose Padilla Jr.	651	2.2
Conservative	Selsia Evans	228	0.8
Write-in		4	0.0
Total votes		29,108	100
Democratic hold			

=== 2010 ===
2010 New York State Assembly election, District 79
Party	Candidate	Votes	%
Democratic	Eric Stevenson	13,116	
Working Families	Eric Stevenson	542	
Total	Eric Stevenson	13,658	96.1
Republican	Deborah Benbow	436	3.1
Conservative	Henry Bonet Jr.	113	0.8
Write-in		9	0.0
Total votes		14,216	100
Democratic hold			
