= Devi Nampiaparampil =

Chronic pain specialist

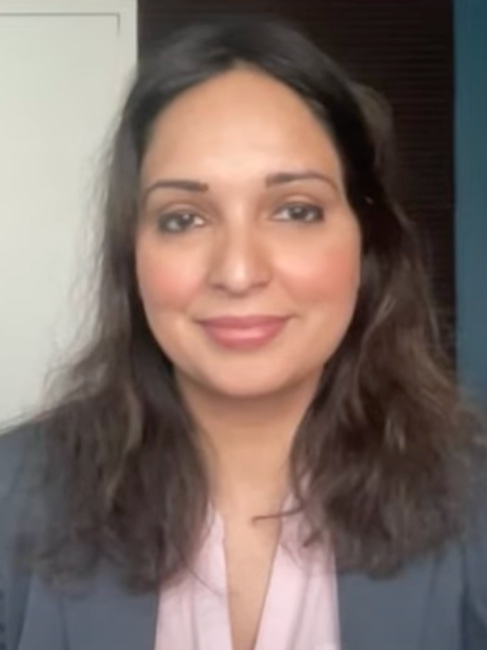
- Nampiaparampil in 2023
- Born: Devi Elizabeth Nampiaparampil; May 13, 1977 (age 49); New York City, US
- Occupations: Physician, journalist, actor
- Years active: 2002–present
- Political party: Republican
- Spouse: Hormis Thaliath
- Website: https://doctordevi.com/

Devi Elizabeth Nampiaparampil (also known as Doctor Devi; born May 13, 1977) is an American physician and researcher who specializes in preventing and treating chronic pain. She performs X-ray-guided invasive spinal procedures for pain, teaches medical students and trainees, comments on medical issues for various platforms, and appears on news and talk shows. She has appeared on the daytime soap opera General Hospital. Nampiaparampil ran for New York City Public Advocate in the November 2021 general election.

== Early life and education ==
Devi Nampiaparampil was born at NYU Medical Center (where she now teaches) to Mary and Joseph Nampiaparampil, Malayali Catholic Indians who had immigrated to the U.S. from Kerala, India. She was educated at Ardsley High School in New York. Between 1995 and 2002, Nampiaparampil attended the seven-year combined B.A./M.D. program at Northwestern University, where she double-majored in economics and biology. She completed her specialty and subspecialty medical training at Harvard Medical School. Nampiaparampilis board-certified in four specialties including Pain Medicine, Sports Medicine, Physical Medicine and Rehabilitation and Hospice and Palliative Medicine.

== Career ==
Nampiaparampil began working for the U.S. Department of Veterans Affairs in 2008 and started the Brain Injury Clinic at the VA Central California in Fresno. She moved to New York City in 2009 to direct and develop the Pain Management program at the VA Hudson Valley. She served as the head of the regional Pain Management program for the New York/New Jersey region but stepped down to further develop the VA's Interventional Pain Management program in New York City. She established the Veterans' Hospital in Manhattan (the VA New York Harbor) as a referral center for invasive pain procedures. She was an assistant professor in the Department of Rehabilitation Medicine at NYU School of Medicine from 2009 to 2015 and then was promoted to associate professor. In 2015, she was elected to the board of the American Society of Interventional Pain Physicians. She is also an editor for Pain Physician, an academic journal for pain management specialists.

In 2015, she became an associate professor of Rehabilitation Medicine at NYU School of Medicine, WNYW-Fox 5 NY's on-air medical contributor, and opened her own private practice, Metropolis Pain Medicine, in downtown Manhattan. Nampiaparampil has also served as a medical legal consultant to Fortune 500 companies.

=== Awards and honors ===
The U.S. Department of Veterans Affairs recognized Nampiaparampilfor "outstanding service" during the wars in Iraq and Afghanistan wars and NYU Langone Medical Center honored her for her achievements in research and education. The Department of Physical Medicine & Rehabilitation (PM&R) at Harvard Medical School honored her for her efforts "to further the field of PM&R."

Nampiaparampil has won research awards from Massachusetts General Hospital, Harvard Medical School, the Massachusetts Medical Society, the American Pain Society, the American Medical Association and the American Society for Regional Anesthesia and Pain Medicine for her work on pain and the opioid crisis. Nampiaparampil has also been named one of Caste Connolly's Top Doctors since 2015. Nampiaparampil has also been awarded the Lifetime Achievement Award from the New York State Senate for her services and sacrifice during COVID pandemic.

=== Selected publications ===
- Nampiaparampil, Devi et al. (2021). "Using Platelet-Rich Plasma to Treat DeQuervain's Tenosynovitis and Cortisone-Induced Skin Discoloration and Atrophy: A Case Study". Pain Medicine Case Reports. 5 (3): 127–131.
- Nampiaparampil, D. E. (2008). "Prevalence of Chronic Pain After Traumatic Brain Injury: A Systematic Review". JAMA. 300 (6): 711–9. doi:10.1001/jama.300.6.711. PMID 18698069. Cited 150 times according to Google Scholar.
- Nampiaparampil, Devi E.; Shmerling, Robert H. (2004). "A review of fibromyalgia". The American Journal of Managed Care. 10 (11 Pt 1): 794–800. PMID 15623268. Cited 106 times according to Google Scholar.
- Harden, R. Norman; Revivo, Gadi; Song, Sharon; Nampiaparampil, Devi; Golden, Gary; Kirincic, Marie; Houle, Timothy T. (2007). "A Critical Analysis of the Tender Points in Fibromyalgia". Pain Medicine. 8 (2): 147–56. doi:10.1111/j.1526-4637.2006.00203.x. PMID 17305686. Cited 50 times according to Google Scholar.
- Binder, David S.; Nampiaparampil, Devi E. (2009). "The provocative lumbar facet joint". Current Reviews in Musculoskeletal Medicine. 2 (1): 15–24. doi:10.1007/s12178-008-9039-y. PMC 2684949. PMID 19468914. Cited 26 times according to Google Scholar.
- Devi E. Nampiaparampil, MD, Joseph X. Nampiaparampil, PhD, MBA, R. Norman Harden, MD, Pain and Prejudice, Pain Medicine, Volume 10, Issue 4, May 2009, Pages 716–721, https://doi.org/10.1111/j.1526-4637.2009.00612.x

=== Media ===
Nampiaparampil has appeared as a physician on the daytime soap opera, General Hospital, before becoming a physician in her real life. She intermittently appeared on the show between 2002 and 2005. She made her debut as a medical expert on television on The Dr. Oz Show when she demonstrated botox injections for chronic migraine pain in front of a live audience. Mehmet Oz nicknamed her Doctor Devi when she appeared on his show.

In 2015, Nampiaparampil worked on a short documentary, entitled, "A Life For A Life: Trading Organs For One More Today," which won a Jury Award at the Directors Guild of America Student Film Awards. She published a related article in Newsweek entitled "How a Death Row Inmate's Request to Give His Organs Kept Him Alive".

In 2016, Nampiaparampil became an on-air medical contributor for Fox 5, analyzing medical developments for Good Day NY, Fox 5 News at 5, News at 6, and News at 10. She has appeared in over 350 national news segments for Fox News Channel, MSNBC, and CNN among other networks.

=== Politics ===
Nampiaparampil ran for New York City Public Advocate in the 2021 election. She won the Republican primary, losing in the general election to incumbent Democrat Jumaane Williams.
