= Diana Gordon (disambiguation) =

Diana Gordon is an American singer/songwriter formerly known as Wynter Gordon.

Diana Gordon may also refer to:

- Diana Gordon (pen name), a pen name of Lucilla Andrews
- Diana Gordon, member of the fictional Gordon family in Saw

== See also ==
- Diane Gordon, U.S. politician
