= Michael Blake (politician) =

American politician (born 1982)

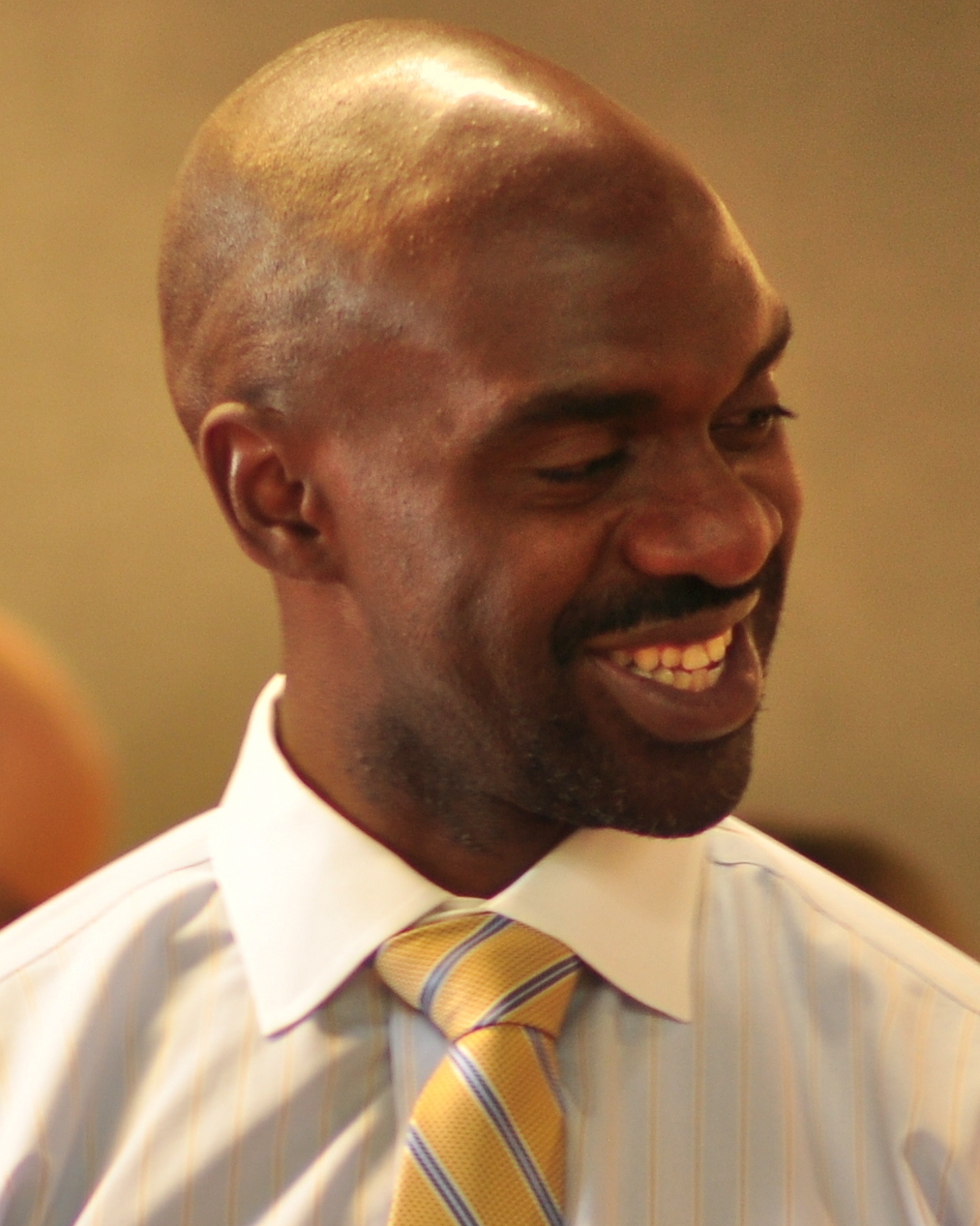
- Blake in 2017

Member of the New York State Assembly from the 79th district
- In office January 1, 2015 – January 1, 2021
- Preceded by: Eric Stevenson
- Succeeded by: Chantel Jackson

Personal details
- Born: Michael Alexander Blake; December 25, 1982 (age 43) New York City, New York, U.S.
- Party: Democratic
- Education: Northwestern University (BA)
- Website: Campaign website

Michael Alexander Blake (born December 25, 1982) is an American politician and member of the Democratic Party. He formerly served as a New York Assemblyman from the 79th district and was the Vice Chair of the Democratic National Committee from February 25, 2017 to January 21, 2021, and a candidate for mayor in 2025. In 2026, he mounted an unsuccessful primary challenge to incumbent Representative Ritchie Torres.

== Early life and education ==
Blake was born on December 25, 1982, in the Bronx to parents who had immigrated from Jamaica. He was named after Jamaican politicians Michael Manley and Alexander Bustamante. After graduating from New York City public schools, Blake went on to attend and graduate from Northwestern University with a degree in journalism.

== Career ==
Blake began his career working in the Michigan House of Representatives and for Illinois State Senator Jeffrey Schoenberg.

Blake served as the Iowa deputy political director for Barack Obama in the 2008 United States presidential election, and following his election to the presidency, Blake became associate director of public engagement and the deputy associate director of the Office of Intergovernmental Affairs. He served as the national deputy director of Operation Vote for President Obama’s 2012 re-election. Blake was noted in Jet magazine as one of nine black politicos behind President Obama’s re-election.

In 2013, he served as the campaign manager for Reshma Saujani for New York City Public Advocate. He and other people created the Atlas Strategy Group, which focuses on policy issues for communities of color.

=== New York State Assembly ===
In 2014, Assemblyman Eric Stevenson was found guilty on corruption charges and was required to vacate his seat in the Bronx. Blake entered the race to replace him. His own candidacy was not without controversy, and the Bronx Democratic Party, who did not support his candidacy, claimed he was not actually a resident of the Bronx. Despite these setbacks, Blake won the Democratic primary over five other candidates. He easily won the general election with nearly 92% of the vote.

Blake was sworn in for his first term on December 15, 2014. He was the Chair of the Subcommittee on Mitchell-Lama and was a member of the Corrections, Housing, Banks, Veterans, Election Law and Governmental Operations committees.

Blake did not seek re-election in 2020; instead, he ran for U.S. House of Representatives.

=== 2019 New York City Public Advocate campaign ===
In 2018, Blake announced his candidacy for New York City Public Advocate. He lost with 8% of the vote to City Councilmember Jumaane Williams in a crowded race with 17 other candidates.

=== 2020 U.S. House of Representatives campaign ===
In 2019, Blake announced his campaign for New York's 15th congressional district; the then-current Representative, José E. Serrano, had announced his retirement from Congress. He lost with 18% of the vote, finishing in second place behind winner Ritchie Torres in the Democratic primary.

=== 2025 New York City mayoral campaign ===
On November 24, 2024, Blake announced he was running for mayor of New York City. He heavily criticized opponent Andrew Cuomo during debates, co-endorsing eventual nominee Zohran Mamdani. He placed eighth in the first round.

2025 New York City Democratic mayoral primary
| Candidate | Round 1 | | Round 2 | | Round 3 | |
| Candidate | Votes | % | Votes | % | Votes | % |
|---|---|---|---|---|---|---|
| Zohran Mamdani | 469,642 | 43.82% | 469,755 | 43.86% | 573,169 | 56.39% |
| Andrew Cuomo | 387,137 | 36.12% | 387,377 | 36.17% | 443,229 | 43.61% |
| Brad Lander | 120,634 | 11.26% | 120,707 | 11.27% | Eliminated | |
| Adrienne Adams | 44,192 | 4.12% | 44,359 | 4.14% | Eliminated | |
| Scott Stringer | 17,820 | 1.66% | 17,894 | 1.67% | Eliminated | |
| Zellnor Myrie | 10,593 | 0.99% | 10,648 | 0.99% | Eliminated | |
| Whitney Tilson | 8,443 | 0.79% | 8,525 | 0.80% | Eliminated | |
| Michael Blake | 4,366 | 0.41% | 4,389 | 0.41% | Eliminated | |
| Jessica Ramos | 4,273 | 0.40% | 4,294 | 0.40% | Eliminated | |
| Paperboy Prince | 1,560 | 0.15% | 1,628 | 0.15% | Eliminated | |
| Selma Bartholomew | 1,489 | 0.14% | 1,505 | 0.14% | Eliminated | |
| Write-ins | 1,581 | 0.15% | Eliminated | | | |
| Active votes | 1,071,730 | 100.00% | 1,071,081 | 99.94% | 1,016,398 | 94.84% |
| Exhausted ballots | —N/a | | 649 | 0.06% | 55,332 | 5.16% |
Source: New York City Board of Elections
