= Michael Benjamin (politician) =

American politician

Michael A. Benjamin (born May 2, 1958) represented District 79 in the New York State Assembly, which includes Morrisania, Crotona Park East, and East Tremont, until December 31, 2010. The seat is currently held by Chantel Jackson.

Chosen in a special election in 2003, Benjamin is a member of the Election Law Committee. A former member of the Bronx Board of Elections and Deputy Chief of the Board of Elections, he sponsored the Campaign Financing Reform Act of 2005.

Prior to his election to the Assembly Benjamin served as a member of local community boards within the Bronx and ran unsuccessfully against City Councilwoman Helen Foster.

Challengers in the 2006 primary were Wilbert Tee Lawton-a district leader-and Sigfredo Gonzalez.

Benjamin holds a B.A.in Political Science from Syracuse University.

Benjamin retired from the State Assembly on December 31, 2010. He now works as a columnist and public affairs consultant.

New York State Assembly
Preceded by Gloria Davis	New York State Assembly, 79th District; 2003–2010	Succeeded by Eric Stevenson
