= David Eisenbach =

American historian and academic

David Eisenbach is a historian and an expert on media and politics and a lecturer in the history department at Columbia University. He was a Democratic candidate for New York City's Public Advocate in the 2017 primary election, where he received 23.42% and 92,246 votes against incumbent Letitia James. He was also a candidate in the February 2019 non-partisan special election for the same position in which he came in 13th place in a field of 17.

== Biography ==
=== Education ===
Eisenbach received a BA in modern European history from Columbia University in 1994, an MA in history education from Teachers College, Columbia University in 1995, and an MA (2001), MPhil (2003) and a PhD (2006) in American history from the Columbia Graduate School of Arts and Sciences.

=== Academic career ===
At Columbia, he teaches courses on the U.S. presidency and media and politics. At the Manhattan School of Music, where he has been on the faculty since 1995, he teaches courses on American history, Shakespeare’s tragedies, and the literature of the 1960s.

Although identifying as straight, Dr. Eisenbach's first book, Gay Power: An American Revolution (2006) is a history of how the gay rights movement in the 1960s and 1970s transformed American politics and society. The American Library Association named Gay Power a 2007 Stonewall honor book, and it was a finalist for the 2007 Lambda Literary Awards in LGBT Studies.

Together with Larry Flynt, Eisenbach co-wrote One Nation Under Sex (2011) which documents how the private lives of America's most powerful leaders shaped history.

=== Politics ===
Dr. Eisenbach was the communications director for Senator Mike Gravel's 2008 presidential election campaign.

He was a Democratic candidate for New York City's Public Advocate in the 2017 primary election, where he received 23.42% and 92,246 votes against incumbent Letitia James. He was also a candidate in the February 2019 non-partisan special election for the same position in which he came in 13th place in a field of 17.

=== Television ===
Eisenbach has been a featured expert and historian on a number of TV productions, including those on AMC, the History Channel and SundanceTV:

- Host and co-writer for "The Beltway Unbuckled" (2009), a special on how the sex lives of several presidents shaped American history.
- Host for the H2 Channel TV series 10 Things You Don't Know About (2012)
- Celebrity history teacher on Season 2 of Dream School (2014)
- Appeared on The Making of the Mob: Chicago (2016)
- Appeared as a historian on Netflix series, "Wyatt Earp and the Cowboy War" (2025)
- To End All War: Oppenheimer & the Atomic Bomb (Peacock / MSNBC) — Self / Historian
- The UnBelievable with Dan Aykroyd (History Channel) — Self / Historian
- The Food That Built America (History Channel) — Self / History Expert
- The Cars That Made America (History Channel) — Self / Historian
- The Cars That Made the World (History Channel) — Self / Historian
- Custer: The Final Mystery (History Channel) — Self / Expert
- The American West (AMC) — Self / Historian
- The Making of the Mob (AMC) — Self / Historian
- Join or Die with Craig Ferguson (History Channel) — Self / Guest Panelist

https://www.imdb.com/name/nm3673104/

== Books ==
- Gay Power: An American Revolution (2006). (ISBN 978-0786716333).
- The Kingmakers: How the Media Threatens Our Security and Our Democracy (2011) with Mike Gravel
- One Nation Under Sex (2011) with Larry Flynt.
