= Edward Griffith (American politician) =

American politician (1930–2023)

Member of the New York State Assembly from the 40th district
- In office January 1, 1973 – December 31, 2000
- Preceded by: Alfred A. Lama
- Succeeded by: Diane Gordon

Personal details
- Born: November 22, 1930 Panama
- Died: October 26, 2023 (aged 92)
- Resting place: Cemetery of the Evergreens, New York City, U.S.
- Party: Democratic
- Occupation: Politician

Edward Griffith (November 22, 1930 – October 26, 2023) also referred to as the Honorable Edward Griffith was a Panamanian-born American politician who served as a Democratic member of the New York State Assembly from 1973 to 2000. He represented Brooklyn's 40th Assembly District, which included portions of East New York, Brownsville, and East Flatbush.

During his 28 years in the Assembly, Griffith worked on legislation concerning education, healthcare, judicial reform, legislative ethics, public safety, and medical research. He chaired the Assembly Ethics and Guidance Committee and sponsored legislation establishing New York State's Spinal Cord Injury Research Program.

== Early life and education ==
Griffith was born in the Republic of Panama in 1930 to Wilberforce and Glenora Griffith. He attended Silver City Occupational High School in the Panama Canal Zone and subsequently taught mathematics at the Educational Institute.

He studied education at Canal Zone College in Panama and political science at Queens College in New York, receiving bachelor's degrees in both fields.

Griffith served in the United States Air Force as a missile technician beginning in 1955. During his military service, he became a naturalized United States citizen. He subsequently settled in Brooklyn, New York, with his family.

== Banking career and community involvement ==
Before entering politics, Griffith worked at First National City Bank, now Citibank, beginning as a teller and eventually becoming a branch manager in Bensonhurst, Brooklyn.

While working in banking, Griffith became involved in community education initiatives in East New York, including neighborhood spelling bee competitions. His involvement connected him with local educators and community organizations.

Griffith subsequently served on Brooklyn's Community School Board for District 19, becoming its first president. He also worked with the United Nations International School Association.

His involvement in education and community affairs preceded his election to the New York State Assembly in 1972.

== Political career ==
Griffith represented Brooklyn's 40th Assembly District from January 1973 through December 2000.

=== Education and access to higher education ===
Education was a recurring focus of Griffith's legislative career.

Griffith sponsored legislation related to New York State's Tuition Assistance Program (TAP), which provides financial assistance to eligible students attending colleges and universities in New York. He also advocated for reforms to the distribution of Regents Scholarships to increase opportunities for students in lower income school districts.

In 1981, Griffith spearheaded emergency legislation preserving transportation services for children with disabilities attending nonpublic schools. The legislation followed a decision by the State Education Department to discontinue certain transportation services.

New York Governor Hugh Carey issued a message of necessity to permit an immediate legislative vote and subsequently signed the measure into law as Chapter 996 of the Laws of 1981.

=== Legislative ethics and judicial reform ===
Griffith served as chairman of the New York State Assembly's Ethics and Guidance Committee, which consisted of equal numbers of Democratic and Republican members.

In 1981, he authored the Ethics Manual for Members and Employees of the New York State Assembly. In 1982, he published Incompatibility of Office: The New York Perspective, examining legal questions concerning public officials holding potentially incompatible positions.

As chairman, Griffith also introduced ethics legislation and participated in the preparation of confidential advisory opinions.

Griffith also played a role in establishing New York's judicial certification procedure, which allows federal courts and certain other appellate courts to refer unresolved questions of New York law to the New York Court of Appeals. In 1982, working with legislative assistant John J. Halloran Jr., Griffith introduced legislation to establish the procedure. After initial objections from the Court of Appeals, Griffith supported a revised proposal in the form of a state constitutional amendment. He introduced a resolution in the Assembly in 1984, and the certification procedure ultimately became effective on January 1, 1986, following legislative approval and voter ratification.

Griffith was a member of the Assembly Judiciary Committee for many years. He advocated for judicial reform, including a constitutional amendment authorizing the New York Court of Appeals to answer certified questions of New York law from designated courts, including federal appellate courts. His contributions to the development of New York's judicial certification procedure were subsequently discussed in legal scholarship, including articles addressing the relationship between state and federal courts.

=== Healthcare and public safety ===
Griffith was a leading sponsor of New York's Chiropractic Insurance Equality legislation, which sought to require health insurers to cover chiropractic services. Alongside State Senator Guy Velella, Griffith had advocated for the legislation since 1991. In 1997, he sponsored Assembly Bill A8431 and led debate on the measure in the Assembly. The legislation sought to establish chiropractic coverage requirements for health insurance plans, including health maintenance organizations (HMOs).

He also advocated for stronger safety regulations in professional boxing following the death of boxer Willie Classen in 1979. Griffith introduced legislation intended to improve medical preparedness and safety standards at professional boxing events. In 1981, he sponsored Assembly legislation supported by Governor Hugh Carey that revised New York's boxing safety requirements. Governor Carey signed the legislation into law in July 1981.

On August 6, 1996, Griffith joined New York City Mayor Rudy Giuliani, Police Commissioner Howard Safir, and other elected officials at the 13th annual National Night Out Against Crime celebration at Betsy Head Park in Brooklyn. The event promoted community participation in crime prevention and cooperation between residents and law enforcement.

=== Spinal cord injury research ===
In 1998, Griffith and New York State Senator Vincent Leibell sponsored legislation establishing the New York State Spinal Cord Injury Research Program. The legislation, signed into law by Governor George Pataki in July 1998, created a research board and a dedicated funding mechanism to support scientific research into spinal cord injuries and paralysis. The program received funding through surcharges imposed on certain motor vehicle violations. Its original funding framework provided for up to $8.5 million annually in support of spinal cord injury research.

In spring 1998, Griffith was introduced to former New York State Trooper Paul Richter, who had sustained a spinal cord injury after being shot during a traffic stop. Terry O'Neill, who facilitated their introduction, recalled that Griffith agreed to sponsor legislation establishing a state research program for spinal cord injuries. The legislation was enacted as Chapter 338 of the Laws of 1998. According to O'Neill, the program had invested nearly $70 million in research by February 2013.

=== Later political career ===
Griffith held the position of Assistant Speaker of the New York State Assembly during his legislative career. In the 2000 Democratic primary election, Griffith was defeated by his former aide, Diane Gordon, who subsequently represented the district. His Assembly service ended on December 31, 2000, following 28 years in office.

== Personal life and death ==
Griffith maintained longstanding ties to Brooklyn and participated in community and civic organizations throughout his career.

He received an honorary Doctor of Humane Letters degree from St. Francis College in recognition of his public service.

Griffith died on October 26, 2023, at the age of 92. He was survived by his only daughter, Sabrina (Griffith) Hurley. His funeral was held on November 4, 2023, at St. Gabriel's Church in East New York, Brooklyn. He was buried at the Cemetery of the Evergreens in Brooklyn.

== Legacy and recognition ==
Griffith's legislative career included contributions to education policy, judicial administration, legislative ethics, public safety, healthcare, and medical research.

In April 2024, the Legislative Gazette published a remembrance of Griffith written by former legislative aide John Halloran, who worked for him between 1978 and 1983. Halloran documented Griffith's work on legislative ethics, judicial reform, boxing safety, and educational services.

In June 2025, Griffith was recognized during proceedings of the New York State Assembly commemorating the contributions of Panamanian Americans to New York's political and civic history.

On September 24, 2026, Panamanian President José Raúl Mulino recognized Griffith during a ceremony designating portions of Franklin Avenue in Crown Heights, Brooklyn, as "Little Panama Way". In his remarks, Mulino referenced Griffith and former New York State Senator Waldaba Stewart as examples of Panamanian immigrants who had served in New York government. The recognition formed part of a broader initiative honoring the contributions of the Panamanian community to Brooklyn.

New York State Assembly
Preceded by Alfred A. Lama	New York State Assembly; 40th District; 1973–2000	Succeeded by Diane Gordon
