= 10 Things You Don't Know About =

- Genre: Documentary; History; Biography
- Narrated by: David Eisenbach (2012); Henry Rollins (2013–14)
- Country of origin: United States
- Original language: English
- No. of seasons: 3
- No. of episodes: 26

Production
- Executive producer: Carl H. Lindahl
- Production company: Asylum Entertainment

Original release
- Network: H2
- Release: February 27, 2012 – October 25, 2014

10 Things You Don't Know About is an American history/biography television series on H2. It was initially presented by historian David Eisenbach for one season. Eisenbach was succeeded as host by musician Henry Rollins for the next two seasons. Each episode of the show presents ten facts about a particular historical figure, group, event, or aspect that are not widely known among the general public. Each fact is accompanied by relevant clips and, during Rollins's tenure, interviews with experts, as well as man-on-the-street interviews. The first season also featured results of an online poll surrounding the ten facts.

The episodes originally ran for 30 minutes (with commercial breaks) each during Eisenbach's tenure; the episodes became twice as long when Rollins took over hosting duties.

The show's first season, which featured Eisenbach, aired on February 27, 2012, running through May 7, 2012. The second season, featuring Rollins, began airing on November 2, 2013. The third season, also hosted by Rollins started on August 16, 2014.

A&E Home Video released the first season of the series on DVD on August 28, 2012.

== Episodes ==
=== Season 1 ===
| No. overall | No. in season | Title | Original release date |
|---|---|---|---|
| 1 | 1 | "Benjamin Franklin" | February 27, 2012 |
This episode explores little-known details of the life of one of America's founding fathers.: Benjamin Franklin; 1. Franklin is a fugitive from the law at 17; 2. Franklin pays for sex 3. Franklin creates the American tabloid press 4. Franklin never flies a kite in a thunderstorm 5. Franklin is the first to chart the Gulf Stream; 6. Franklin owns slaves 7. Franklin invents a strange musical instrument 8. Franklin is a suspected serial killer 9. Franklin helps start America's first hospital 10. Franklin's sex drive helps win the American Revolution: Anne Louise Brillon de Jouy's husband influences Louis XVI to support the Americans.
| 2 | 2 | "Abraham Lincoln" | February 27, 2012 |
The private life of America's 16th president is explored.: Abraham Lincoln; 1. Lincoln says he was enslaved as a child 2. Lincoln likes a good fistfight 3. Lincoln never joins a church 4. Lincoln is a techno geek: Abraham Lincoln's patent 5. Lincoln once held views that are now considered racist 6. Lincoln has trouble with women 7. Lincoln sleeps with men 8. Lincoln's best friend owns slaves 9. Lincoln's hat takes a bullet meant for him 10. Lincoln is photographed with his killer
| 3 | 3 | "John F. Kennedy" | March 5, 2012 |
Lesser-known details about the life of America's 35th president.: John F. Kennedy; 1. Young JFK is a slacker as a student 2. JFK is addicted to danger 3. JFK is diagnosed with leukemia 4. JFK's first serious girlfriend breaks his heart 5. Young JFK carries a top-secret World War II message 6. JFK takes steroids 7. JFK's biggest political supporter is not his father 8. JFK and Richard Nixon are good friends 9. JFK uses the IRS to intimidate his enemies 10. JFK warns Martin Luther King Jr. about J. Edgar Hoover
| 4 | 4 | "J. Edgar Hoover" | March 5, 2012 |
The truth about the first Director of the Federal Bureau of Investigation, J. Edgar Hoover.: J. Edgar Hoover; 1. Hoover is a Peeping Tom; 2. Hoover's father goes insane 3. Hoover is a librarian 4. Hoover has the country's largest collection of porn 5. Hoover is the world's most successful sexual blackmailer 6. Hoover intimidates Hollywood; 7. Hoover kills his neighbor's cat 8. Hoover creates a gay spy ring 9. Hoover has the goods on Richard Nixon; 10. Hoover is buried in a lead-lined coffin
| 5 | 5 | "The O.K. Corral" | March 12, 2012 |
The truth about the exaggerated events and personalities involved in the gunfight at the O.K. Corral.: The Gunfight at the O.K. Corral; 1. The gunfight does not happen at the O.K. Corral; 2. Wyatt Earp is the pimp of Peoria; 3. Six army mules cause the gunfight 4. The gunfight is a battle between Democrats and Republicans; 5. Booze fuels the gunfight 6. The sheriff fails to stop the fight 7. The gunfight lasts only 30 seconds 8. The gunfight starts a blood feud 9. Wyatt Earp becomes a cold-blooded killer 10. Wyatt Earp looks for a movie deal
| 6 | 6 | "The Roosevelts" | March 19, 2012 |
Secrets of Franklin and Eleanor Roosevelt are explored.: Franklin and Eleanor Roosevelt; 1. FDR's mother wants him to dump Eleanor; 2. FDR loves his wife's secretary 3. Eleanor's unconventional girlfriends turn her into a political activist 4. FDR avoids assassination thanks to a rickety bench 5. Eleanor wants FDR to become a dictator 6. Eleanor falls in love... with a woman 7. FDR used cocaine 8. The Roosevelts defend the White House against the British invasion 9. Eleanor hates FDR's policies toward Jewish immigrants and Japanese Americans; 10. Eleanor makes peace with FDR's mistress
| 7 | 7 | "The Mormons" | March 26, 2012 |
This episode explores lesser-known facts about Mormonism and its followers since the church's founding.: The Mormons; 1. Joseph Smith is a treasure hunter 2. Book of Mormons says American Indians were Jewish; 3. Masonic Rites inspire Mormon rituals 4. Mormons are targets of genocide 5. Joseph Smith's wife threatens to take multiple husbands 6. Mormons agree to leave the United States; 7. The U.S. deploys troops to subdue the Mormons; 8. Mormons massacre 120 innocent pioneers 9. Mormons own brothels 10. Mormons banks finance mob-owned hotels and casinos in Las Vegas
| 8 | 8 | "Pablo Escobar" | April 2, 2012 |
Colombian drug lord Pablo Escobar's life is examined.: Pablo Escobar; 1. Escobar is a pothead 2. Escobar's first victims are already dead 3. Escobar trafficks in cocaine-soaked designer jeans 4. Colombia's government helps Escobar launder his drug profits 5. Escobar succeeds by being both loved and feared 6. Escobar starts a war against his own country 7. Escobar burns $2M in a bonfire to keep warm 8. Escobar's pursuers use his own tactics to take him down 9. Escobar rises from the grave 10. Escobar helps America kill Osama bin Laden
| 9 | 9 | "George Patton" | April 9, 2012 |
Little-known facts about American World War II general George S. Patton are explored.: George Patton; 1. Patton rides with the grey ghost of the Confederacy; 2. Patton is an Olympic athlete 3. Patton chases Pancho Villa; 4. Patton does not wear pearl-handled pistols 5. Patton and Eisenhower are nearly killed in a tank accident 6. Patton's belief in reincarnation leads to his infamous slapping incident 7. Patton helps fool Hitler about D-Day; 8. Patton launches a secret mission to liberate his son-in-law from a POW camp 9. Patton wants war with the Soviets; 10. Patton smuggles Nuremberg Laws out of Germany
| 10 | 10 | "Caligula" | April 16, 2012 |
The life of Roman Emperor Caligula is profiled.: Caligula; 1. Caligula is nicknamed "Little Boot"; 2. Caligula parties with the man who killed his family 3. Caligula is a good government reformer 4. Caligula builds the longest bridge on Earth; 5. Caligula makes it a crime to look at his bald spot 6. Caligula appoints his horse as his consul 7. Caligula is a working-class hero 8. Caligula loves to be hated 9. A Roman historian writes of Caligula's incest with his sisters 10. Caligula is assassinated because of a bad joke
| 11 | 11 | "Adolf Hitler" | April 30, 2012 |
Little-known fact about Adolf Hitler's life.: Adolf Hitler; 1. Hitler discovers the swastika in church 2. Hitler fears he's a Jew; 3. Hitler is a high school dropout 4. Hitler is a momma's boy 5. Hitler is rejected from art school because he cannot draw humans 6. Young Hitler has a Jewish friend 7. Hitler fears sex and women 8. Hitler loves World War I 9. The German army says Young Hitler lacks leadership potential 10. Hitler enters politics working as a spy
| 12 | 12 | "The Rat Pack" | May 7, 2012 |
Features the group of actors known as The Rat Pack.: The Rat Pack; 1. Sinatra does not start the original Rat Pack; 2. Sinatra's Rat Pack never calls itself "The Rat Pack"; 3. Sinatra saves Sammy Davis Jr. from the Mob; 4. Dino is not a drunk 5. Joey Bishop is the brains behind The Rat Pack; 6. The Rat Pack invents its own language 7. The Rat Packers are all fervent liberals 8. Sinatra's mob connections are exaggerated 9. JFK interrupts his presidential campaign to catch The Rat Pack; 10. JFK's cold shoulder breaks up The Rat Pack

=== Season 2 ===
| No. overall | No. in season | Title | Original release date |
|---|---|---|---|
| 13 | 1 | "Presidential Assassinations" | November 2, 2013 |
This episode explores the assassins and wannabe assassins of American Presidents.: Presidential Assassinations; 1. Robert Todd Lincoln is connected to three of the four presidential assassinations 2. Booth's original plan was to kidnap Abraham Lincoln; 3. The first president to face an assassination fought back 4. An assassin did not kill President Garfield ... his doctors did 5. Assassins' bodies rarely make it to the grave in one piece 6. A president was nearly assassinated at his home and it was not the White House; 7. One film connects two assassination attempts 8. No secret service agent has died in an assassination attempt ... but a mayor has 9. President Ford was targeted by the only female assassins 10. The KGB was part of the real conspiracy linked to the JFK assassination
| 14 | 2 | "The White House" | November 9, 2013 |
Little-known facts about The White House are explored.: The White House; 1. The Oval Office is designed to keep guests off-guard 2. Less than one quarter of the original White House exists today 3. The original White House is buried under a baseball diamond 4. The White House was originally designed to be a palace 5. The White House used to have its own brothel 6. The President can add almost anything to the White House; 7. The White House never refuses a gift 8. The White House bills the First Family every month 9. The first person to live in the White House was not the President; 10. There are multiple White Houses all over the world
| 15 | 3 | "The Founding Fathers" | November 16, 2013 |
Lesser-known details about the life of America's founding fathers.: The Founding Fathers; 1. The Founding Fathers were disgusted by Americans; 2. George Washington owned the largest whiskey distillery in America; 3. The Founding Fathers had money problems 4. Alexander Hamilton and Aaron Burr were a legal defense team 5. Many Founding Fathers hated each other 6. George Washington founded American espionage 7. Benjamin Franklin hired 'pirates' during the Revolution; 8. Thomas Jefferson was afraid of confrontation 9. Thomas Jefferson wanted to outlaw slavery 10. The Founding Fathers got many of their ideas from Native Americans
| 16 | 4 | "Prohibition" | November 23, 2013 |
This episode explores Prohibition and the little-known facts surrounding it.: Prohibition; 1. Moonshine was illegal 150 years before Prohibition; 2. Public water fountains were built to stop people from drinking booze 3. Jails were sold on the eve of Prohibition; 4. The government poisoned alcohol that killed nearly 10,000 people 5. One of the wettest spots in the country was Capitol Hill; 6. In Los Angeles the cops were the bootleggers 7. A Jury was put on trial after it drank the evidence 8. Al Capone's brother was a Prohibition Cop; 9. Many Mob bosses escaped a violent death 10. Prohibition and the Mafia gave rise to Jazz

=== Season 3 ===
| No. overall | No. in season | Title | Original release date |
|---|---|---|---|
| 17 | 1 | "The Flag" | August 16, 2014 |
This episode explores little-known details surrounding the U.S. flag and anything connected to it.: The Flag; 1. The first American flag was not designed by Betsy Ross; 2. The flag that inspired "The Star-Spangled Banner" had two extra stripes 3. Early patriots cut up the flag to make souvenirs 4. The first Confederate flag caused friendly fire 5. Another pledge existed before the Pledge of Allegiance, which included what would later become the Nazi salute 6. A man received 10 years in prison for refusing to kiss the flag 7. Most Americans break the Flag Code laws everyday 8. The American flag is the third oldest flag still in use 9. All of the U.S. flags on the moon are probably white 10. Burning the flag is encouraged by law
| 18 | 2 | "Texas" | August 23, 2014 |
This episode explores little-known details surrounding the U.S. state of Texas.: Texas; 1. The Texas army could have escaped the Alamo; 2. 100 years ago, camels roamed the Texas prairie 3. Texas created a town just to watch a train crash 4. Texas pirate Jean Lafitte had more ships than the U.S. Navy; 5. San Antonio was almost the movie making capital of the world 6. The Texas Rangers violated borders to catch criminals 7. Illegal immigrants from the U.S. caused Mexico to lose Texas; 8. The Texas Longhorns did not come from Texas; 9. Texas had the right to add 4 more states to the U.S.; 10. The worst natural disaster in U.S. history happened in Texas
| 19 | 3 | "Civil Rights" | August 30, 2014 |
This episode explores little-known details surrounding the American Civil Rights Movement and beyond.: Civil Rights; 1. Lyndon Johnson taught at a segregated school 2. Rosa Parks was not the first woman to refuse to give up her seat 3. Martin Luther King stopped Star Trek's only black actress from quitting 4. Zoot suits were outlawed during World War II; 5. Malcolm X held a secret meeting with the Ku Klux Klan; 6. The majority of the Black Panthers were women 7. A black student was jailed just for applying to college 8. Black and white basketball teams played championships years before the NBA; 9. California had the most Jim Crow laws of any state 10. One Japanese American spent 40 years fighting his internment conviction
| 20 | 4 | "Edison & Tesla" | September 6, 2014 |
This episode explores little-known facts about Thomas Edison and Nikola Tesla and the uneasy relationship between them.: Edison & Tesla; 1. The "war of the currents" almost led to an electric duel 2. Congress killed Edison's first patented invention 3. Tesla was inspired by Christopher Columbus; Egg of Columbus; 4. Edison's x-ray machine was sent to save President McKinley's life 5. Edison's storage battery was his most profitable invention 6. Mark Twain was Tesla's test dummy 7. Edison started writing a sci-fi novel 8. Tesla's dream of wireless energy relied on hot air balloons 9. Edison accidentally invented the modern tattoo gun 10. Tesla's first job for Edison was on a luxury liner
| 21 | 5 | "The American Revolution" | September 13, 2014 |
This episode explores little-known details surrounding the American Revolution.: The American Revolution; 1. Many Americans did not support the Boston Tea Party; 2. The first submarine attack happened during the Revolution; 3. A British officer could have assassinated George Washington; 4. A female patriot rode twice as far as Paul Revere; 5. American troops starved at Valley Forge while many colonists got rich 6. George Washington was nearly fired from the Army; 7. Benedict Arnold's wife was the real traitor 8. Colonial sailors attacked the British mainland 9. The most important Revolutionary War spy was a slave 10. More troops died prisoners of war than in battle
| 22 | 6 | "The Hoover Dam" | September 20, 2014 |
This episode explores little-known details surrounding the Hoover Dam.: The Hoover Dam; 1. Edison's company nearly built a dam at the same site 30 years before 2. One early plan was to blast rock from the canyon walls 3. A father and a son died working on the Hoover Dam; 4. A deadly disaster in California nearly derailed the Hoover Dam; 5. The U.S. broke labor laws to build the Hoover Dam; 6. The Hoover Dam destroyed a town 7. The Hoover Dam leaked for nine years after it was built 8. The only grave at the Hoover Dam belongs to a dog 9. The largest lake in California was created by accident 10. Heavy firepower was used to protect the dam
| 23 | 7 | "Marijuana" | October 4, 2014 |
This episode explores little-known details surrounding marijuana, especially its place in the United States.: Marijuana; 1. No one knows where the word marijuana comes from 2. Colonists were required to grow hemp 3. Hemp bought some slaves their freedom 4. Cannabis used to be a rich man's drug 5. The U.S. government used to tax marijuana 6. During World War II, one could dodge the draft by growing hemp 7. The U.S. government tested marijuana as a truth serum 8. Henry Ford developed a hemp car 9. Hundreds of thousands of marijuana plants grow on public land 10. The U.S. government has grown marijuana for decades
| 24 | 8 | "Money" | October 11, 2014 |
This episode explores little-known details surrounding money in general, with some focus on money within the context of the United States.: Money; 1. The military burned all U.S. money circulated in Hawaii; 2. The first federally issued bills were all hand-signed... twice 3. Ridges on coins were originally an anti-theft measure 4. The largest coin in the world is twelve feet in diameter 5. It was once illegal to own gold in the U.S.; 6. Local currencies are legal within the United States; 7. The U.S. was once completely debt free 8. Wishing wells were originally offerings to the gods 9. Lotteries financed early America; 10. The U.S. government would replace damaged money
| 25 | 9 | "Las Vegas" | October 18, 2014 |
This episode explores little-known details surrounding the history of Las Vegas and its culture.: Las Vegas; 1. The Great Depression led to legalized gambling 2. Vegas watched the detonation of atomic bombs for over a decade 3. A radar pioneer abandoned science to invent card counting 4. Howard Hughes got the Mob out of Las Vegas; 5. The "Welcome to Las Vegas" sign was never trademarked 6. One Vegas slot machine took 21 years to pay out 7. FDR helped the hookers get out of Las Vegas; 8. Vegas led to Elvis's death 9. Hidden catwalks were used to spy in casinos 10. Gambling ships in Los Angeles came before Las Vegas
| 26 | 10 | "The Gold Rush" | October 25, 2014 |
This episode explores little-known details surrounding the California Gold Rush.: The Gold Rush; 1. The man whose name is synonymous with the Gold Rush did not get rich 2. One square mile in Colorado held billions in gold 3. The Gold Rush created massive traffic jams 4. The Gold Rush led to cutting-edge travel designs 5. Some of the most valuable gold in California was accidentally destroyed 6. Vigilante justice was sanctioned in Gold Country; 7. More people got rich from water & supplies than gold 8. A Gold Rush era secret society still exists today 9. Destructive mining created America's first environmental law 10. A fleet of ships that brought gold seekers still lies under San Francisco
