= Alfred A. Lama =

20th-century Italian-American architect and politician

Member of the New York State Assembly
- In office January 1, 1943 – December 1, 1972
- Preceded by: Robert Giordano
- Succeeded by: Edward Griffith (American politician)
- Constituency: Kings County's 23rd district (1943-1954); Kings County's 15th district (1955-1965); 40th district (1966-1972)

Personal details
- Born: 1899 Italy
- Died: January 3, 1984 (aged 84–85) Flower Hill, New York, U.S.
- Party: Democratic Party
- Spouse: Marie Lama
- Children: 1
- Education: Cooper Union
- Occupation: Architect, politician

Alfred A. Lama (1899 – January 3, 1984) was an Italian-born American architect and politician. He served as a Democratic member of the New York State Assembly from 1942 to 1972, representing portions of Brooklyn.

== Early life ==
Lama was born in 1899 in Italy. He emigrated to the United States with his family in 1904, settling in Brooklyn, New York City.

Lama graduated from Cooper Union with a bachelor's degree in architecture.

== Career ==
Lama was an architect. He was the co-founder of Lama & Vassalotti, an architectural firm based in Brooklyn and Queens. In 1932, he was elected as vice president of the Architects Club of Brooklyn. He was elected as the president of the Brooklyn Society of Architects in 1941.

Lama served as a Democratic member of the New York State Assembly from 1943 to 1972, representing Brooklyn. He was the co-founder of the Mitchell–Lama Housing Program.

== Personal life, death and legacy ==
With his wife Marie, he had a son, Alfred M. Lama. They resided in Oakdale, New York.

Lama died on January 3, 1984, at St. Francis Hospital in Flower Hill, New York. His funeral was held at the St. John Nepomucene Roman Catholic Church in Bohemia, New York.

Lama Court, a small lane in Brooklyn, was named in his honor when he was an architect before he ran for office.

New York State Assembly
Preceded by Robert Giordano	Member of the New York State Assembly for Kings County, 23rd district 1943–1954	District abolished
Preceded by James J. Amelia	Member of the New York State Assembly for Kings County, 15th district 1955–1965	District abolished
New district	Member of the New York State Assembly for the 40th district 1966–1972	Succeeded by Edward Griffith
