= 2019 New York City Public Advocate election =

- November 5, 2019
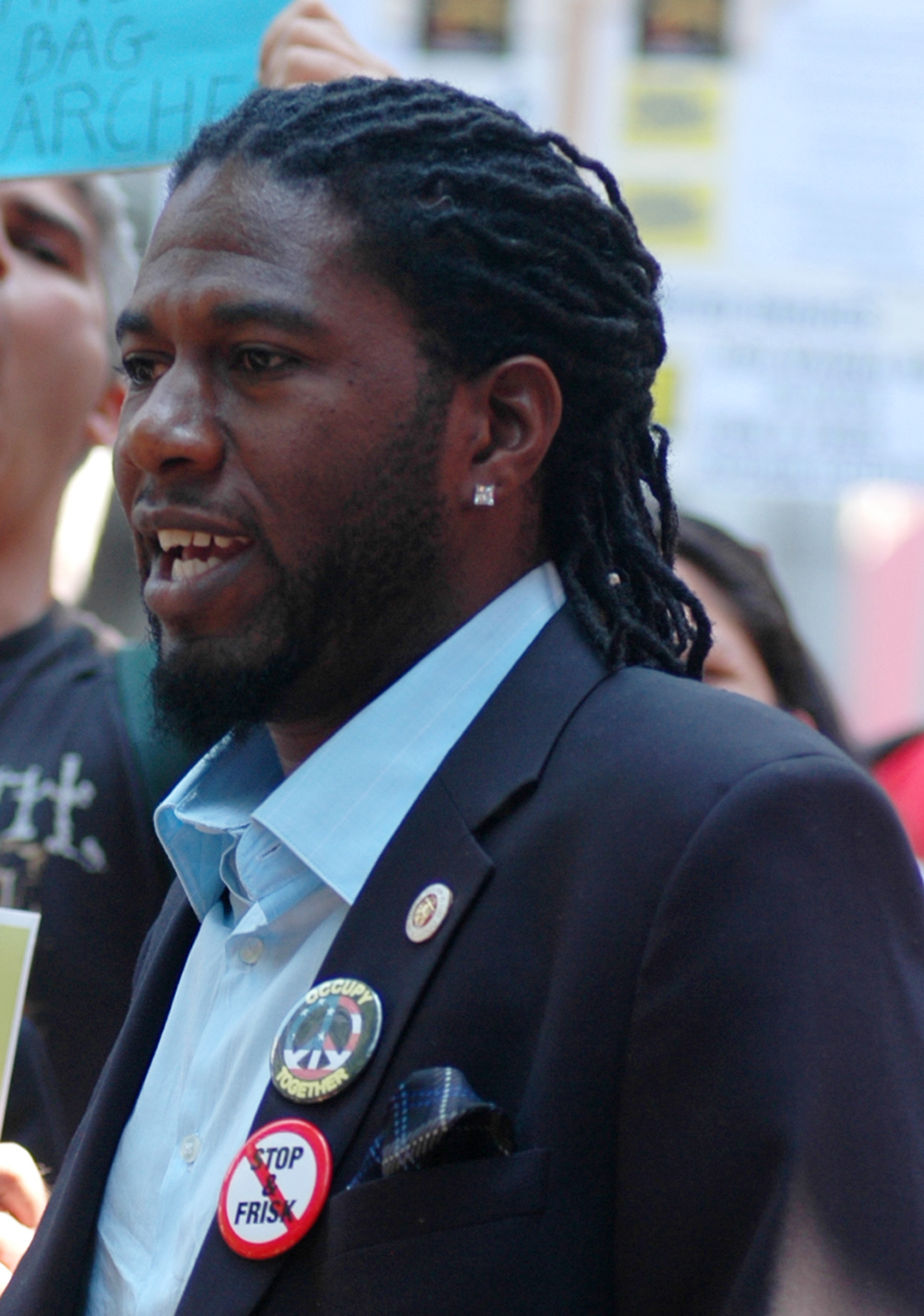

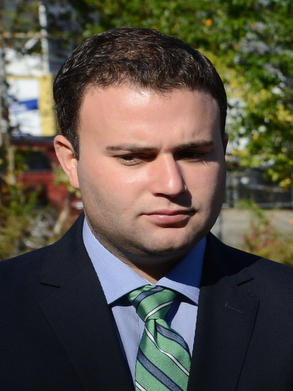
Candidate	Jumaane Williams	Joe Borelli
Party	Democratic	Republican
Alliance		Conservative
Popular vote	607,441	155,617
Percentage	77.8%	20.0%
- Williams: 40–50% 50–60% 60–70% 70–80% 80–90% >90% Borelli: 40–50% 50–60% 60–70% 70–80% 80–90% >90% Tie: 40–50% No votes
Public Advocate before election
Jumaane Williams
Democratic
Elected Public Advocate
Jumaane Williams
Democratic

The 2019 New York City Public Advocate election was held on November 5, 2019. Incumbent Jumaane Williams, who won the special election earlier in the year, was elected.

== Democratic primary ==
=== Candidates ===
==== Declared ====
- Jumaane Williams, Incumbent

== Republican primary ==
=== Candidates ===
==== Declared ====
- Joe Borelli, New York City Councilmember from the 51st district

== Libertarian Party ==
=== Candidates ===
==== Declared ====
- Devin Balkind, Chair of the Brooklyn Libertarian Party
- Daniel Christmann

== General Election results ==
2019 New York City Public Advocate General Election Results
Party	Candidate	Votes	%
Democratic	Jumaane Williams (incumbent)	607,441	77.8
Republican	Joe Borelli	132,883	17.0
Conservative	Joe Borelli	22,734	3.0
Total	Joe Borelli	155,617	20.0
Libertarian	Devin Balkind	15,676	2.0
Write-in		1,461	0.2
Total votes		780,195	100
Democratic hold			
