= New York's 40th State Assembly district =

American legislative district

Assemblymember
Ron Kim; D–Flushing

New York's 40th State Assembly district is one of the 150 districts in the New York State Assembly. It has been represented by Ron Kim since 2013.

Since 2020, the district has trended Republican in state and federal races, voting for Curtis Sliwa in 2021, Lee Zeldin in 2022, and Donald Trump in 2024.

== Geography ==
=== 2020s ===
District 40 is in Queens. It contains most of the neighborhoods of Flushing and Murray Hill, and portions of Whitestone and Clearview.

The district overlaps (partially) with New York's 3rd and 6th congressional districts, the 11th and 16th districts of the New York State Senate, and the 19th and 20th districts of the New York City Council.

=== 2010s ===
District 40 is in Queens. It contains portions of Whitestone, Flushing, and Murray Hill.

=== 2000s ===
District 40 was in Brooklyn. It contained the neighborhoods of Starrett City, The Hole, and portions of East New York and Brownsville.

== Recent election results ==
=== 2026 ===
2026 New York State Assembly election, District 40
Party	Candidate	Votes	%
Democratic	Ron Kim		
Working Families	Ron Kim		
Total	Ron Kim (incumbent)		
Write-in			
Total votes			100.0

=== 2024 ===
2024 New York State Assembly election, District 40
Primary election
Party	Candidate	Votes	%
Democratic	Ron Kim (incumbent)	1,695	53.9
Democratic	Yi Andy Chen	1,252	39.8
Democratic	Dao Yin	185	5.9
Write-in		15	0.5
Total votes		3,147	100.0
General election
Democratic	Ron Kim	12,499	
Working Families	Ron Kim	982	
Total	Ron Kim (incumbent)	13,481	55.3
Republican	Philip Wang	10,007	
Conservative	Philip Wang	807	
Total	Philip Wang	10,814	44.4
Write-in		68	0.3
Total votes		24,363	100.0
Democratic hold			

=== 2022 ===
2022 New York State Assembly election, District 40
Primary election
Party	Candidate	Votes	%
Democratic	Ron Kim (incumbent)	1,931	50.7
Democratic	Kenneth Chiu	1,869	49.0
Write-in		12	0.3
Total votes		3,812	100.0
General election
Democratic	Ron Kim	7,406	
Working Families	Ron Kim	645	
Total	Ron Kim (incumbent)	8,051	51.1
Republican	Sharon Liao	7,212	
Conservative	Sharon Liao	483	
Total	Sharon Liao	7,695	48.8
Write-in		18	0.1
Total votes		15,764	100.0
Democratic hold			

=== 2020 ===
2020 New York State Assembly election, District 40
Primary election
Party	Candidate	Votes	%
Democratic	Ron Kim (incumbent)	3,660	70.2
Democratic	Steven Lee	1,534	29.5
Write-in		16	0.3
Total votes		5,210	100.0
General election
Democratic	Ron Kim (incumbent)	18,214	83.1
Justice and Peace	Steven Lee	3,566	16.3
Write-in		137	0.6
Total votes		21,917	100.0
Democratic hold			

=== 2018 ===
2018 New York State Assembly election, District 40
Primary election
Party	Candidate	Votes	%
Reform	John Scandalios	124	96.1
Write-in		5	3.9
Total votes		129	100.0
General election
Democratic	Ron Kim	11,550	
Working Families	Ron Kim	734	
Total	Ron Kim (incumbent)	12,284	87.5
Reform	John Scandalios	1,689	12.0
Write-in		59	0.5
Total votes		14,032	100.0
Democratic hold			

=== 2016 ===
2016 New York State Assembly election, District 40
Party	Candidate	Votes	%
Democratic	Ron Kim	15,697	
Working Families	Ron Kim	782	
Total	Ron Kim (incumbent)	16,479	75.2
Republican	Miriam Rodriguez	5,168	
Reform	Miriam Rodriguez	251	
Total	Miriam Rodriguez	5,419	24.7
Write-in		17	0.1
Total votes		21,915	100.0
Democratic hold			

=== 2014 ===
2014 New York State Assembly election, District 40
Party	Candidate	Votes	%
Democratic	Ron Kim	5,816	
Working Families	Ron Kim	308	
Independence	Ron Kim	168	
Total	Ron Kim (incumbent)	6,292	66.9
Republican	Philip Gim	3,077	32.7
Write-in		35	0.4
Total votes		9,404	100.0
Democratic hold			

=== 2012 ===
2012 New York State Assembly election, District 40
Primary election
Party	Candidate	Votes	%
Democratic	Ron Kim	1,206	27.1
Democratic	Yen Chou	1,022	23.0
Democratic	Ethel Chen	993	22.3
Democratic	Myungsuk Lee	666	14.9
Democratic	Martha Flores-Vazquez	560	12.6
Write-in		6	0.1
Total votes		4,453	100.0
Republican	Philip Gim	311	72.0
Republican	Sunny Hahn	120	27.8
Write-in		1	0.2
Total votes		432	100.0
General election
Democratic	Ron Kim	12,928	
Working Families	Ron Kim	386	
Independence	Ron Kim	147	
Total	Ron Kim	13,461	67.6
Republican	Philip Gim	6,409	32.2
Write-in		35	0.2
Total votes		19,905	100.0
Democratic win (new boundaries)			

=== 2010 ===
2010 New York State Assembly election, District 40
Primary election
Party	Candidate	Votes	%
Democratic	Inez Barron (incumbent)	3,715	74.6
Democratic	Kenneth Evans	1,264	25.4
Write-in		4	0.1
Total votes		4,983	100.0
General election
Democratic	Inez Barron (incumbent)	16,527	93.6
Republican	Kenneth Waluyn	973	
Conservative	Kenneth Waluyn	154	
Total	Kenneth Waluyn	1,127	6.4
Write-in		5	0.0
Total votes		17,659	100.0
Democratic hold			

=== 2008 ===
2008 New York State Assembly election, District 40
Party	Candidate	Votes	%
Democratic	Inez Barron	28,528	
Working Families	Inez Barron	511	
Total	Inez Barron	29,039	96.6
Republican	Kenneth Waluyn	921	
Conservative	Kenneth Waluyn	97	
Total	Kenneth Waluyn	1,018	3.4
Write-in		0	0.0
Total votes		30,057	100.0
Democratic hold			

=== 2006 ===
2006 New York State Assembly election, District 40
Primary election
Party	Candidate	Votes	%
Democratic	Diane Gordon (incumbent)	3,856	57.0
Democratic	Kenneth Evans	1,678	24.8
Democratic	Winchester Key	1,235	18.2
Write-in		0	0.0
Total votes		6,769	100.0
General election
Democratic	Diane Gordon (incumbent)	12,316	94.1
Republican	Godfrey Jelks	567	
Conservative	Godfrey Jelks	200	
Total	Godfrey Jelks	767	5.9
Write-in		6	0.0
Total votes		13,089	100.0
Democratic hold			

=== 2004 ===
2004 New York State Assembly election, District 40
Party	Candidate	Votes	%
Democratic	Diane Gordon (incumbent)	25,204	95.0
Republican	Mohammad Qureshi	1,196	
Conservative	Mohammad Qureshi	142	
Total	Mohammad Qureshi	1,338	5.0
Write-in		0	0.0
Total votes		26,542	100.0
Democratic hold			

=== 2002 ===
2002 New York State Assembly election, District 40
Primary election
Party	Candidate	Votes	%
Democratic	Diane Gordon (incumbent)	4,440	79.7
Democratic	Kenneth Evans	1,132	20.3
Write-in		0	0.0
Total votes		5,572	100.0
General election
Democratic	Diane Gordon (incumbent)	13,496	94.4
Republican	Lorraine Foote	681	4.8
Conservative	Ernest Johnson	113	0.8
Write-in		0	0.0
Total votes		14,290	100.0
Democratic hold			

=== Federal results in Assembly District 40 ===
Year	Office	Results
2024	President	Trump 50.3 - 48.2%
2024	Senate	Gillibrand 54.0 - 45.1%
2022	Senate	Schumer 55.6 – 43.5%
2020	President	Biden 61.5 – 37.5%
2018	Senate	Gillibrand 72.2 – 27.7%
2016	President	Clinton 66.9 – 30.2%
2016	Senate	Schumer 76.6 – 21.1%
2012	President	Obama 73.6 – 25.4%
2012	Senate	Gillibrand 79.5 – 19.2%
