= Jumaane Williams =

American politician (born 1976)

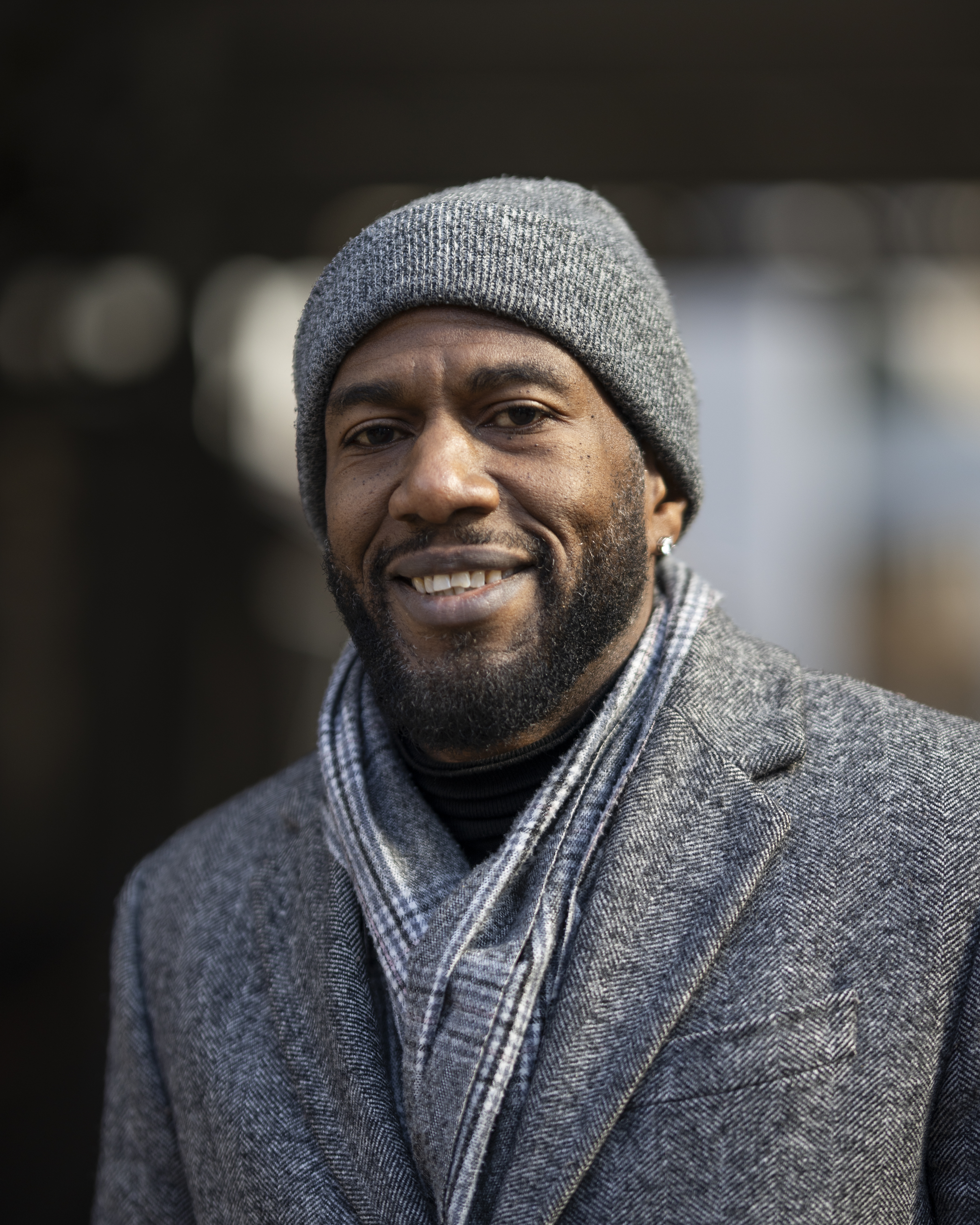
- Williams in 2026

5th New York City Public Advocate
- Incumbent
- Assumed office March 19, 2019
- First Deputy: Nick E. Smith (2019–2024); Vacant (2024–present)
- Preceded by: Corey Johnson (acting); Letitia James

Member of the New York City Council from the 45th district
- In office January 1, 2010 – March 19, 2019
- Preceded by: Kendall Stewart
- Succeeded by: Farah Louis

Personal details
- Born: May 11, 1976 (age 50) New York City, New York, U.S.
- Party: Democratic
- Other political affiliations: Working Families Party; Democratic Socialists of America
- Education: Brooklyn College (BA, MA)
- Website: www.jumaanewilliams.com advocate.nyc.gov

Jumaane D. Williams (/dʒuˈmɑːni/ joo-MAH-nee; born May 11, 1976) is an American activist and politician who has served as the New York City Public Advocate since 2019. A member of the Democratic Party and a self-described democratic socialist, he is a former member of the New York City Council from the 45th district, which includes East Flatbush, Flatbush, Flatlands, Marine Park, and Midwood in Brooklyn.

Williams was a member of the New York City Council from 2010 to 2019. He served as the council's deputy leader and as chair of the Task Force on City Workforce Equity. A candidate for lieutenant governor of New York in 2018, he lost to incumbent Kathy Hochul. Williams was elected New York City Public Advocate in the February 2019 special and November 2019 general elections to complete the term of Letitia James, who resigned to become attorney general of New York. He was re-elected in 2021 and 2025. Williams ran for governor in 2022, losing to incumbent governor Kathy Hochul in the Democratic primary.

== Early life and education ==
Williams's parents, Greg and Patricia Williams, are from St. Andrew, Grenada. His father was a footballer and cricketer before moving to the United States to study medicine. He has a brother.

Williams is an alumnus of Brooklyn Technical High School and Brooklyn College, where he earned a Bachelor of Arts in political science in 2001 and a Master of Arts in urban policy and administration in 2005.

== Political career ==
=== New York City Council (2010–2019) ===
Williams was elected after defeating incumbent Councilmember Kendall Stewart in the September 2009 Democratic primary by a margin of 12 points. Williams won the general election with an endorsement from the Working Families Party. He was easily reelected in 2013.

In June 2013, the New York City Council passed Williams's Community Safety Act, which established an Inspector General to oversee the New York Police Department and created an enforceable ban against bias-based profiling. The act was passed over then-Mayor Michael Bloomberg's veto. Williams has been an outspoken opponent of the NYPD's approach to stop-and-frisk in New York City.

In July 2013, Williams introduced "house party" legislation requiring parties with 40 or more people in attendance to register with the police. He also wants event organizers who advertise on social media and those charging admission to pay fines.

On June 29, 2015, Mayor Bill de Blasio signed Williams's legislation, the Fair Chance Act, commonly known as Ban the Box. The law prohibits public and private employers from inquiring about an applicant's criminal history until a conditional offer of employment is made.

On August 13, 2015, the New York City Council passed Intro. 700, Williams's legislation, which, along with bills sponsored by Council Speaker Melissa Mark Viverito and Council Member Dan Garodnick, established regulations for "tenant relocation specialists", people landlords employ to buy out tenants. The mayor signed the legislation into law on September 9, 2015.

Williams has cited his religious beliefs as an influence on his views on issues such as gay marriage and abortion. He expressed opposition to gay marriage and abortion as recently as 2017, but has since altered his position on these issues. As of 2019, Williams had reportedly received a 100% rating from the Planned Parenthood of New York City Action Fund.

Williams resigned from office on March 19, 2019 to become New York City Public Advocate. He declined to back his former staffer, Farah Louis, to succeed him on the city council, instead endorsing Monique Chandler-Waterman, who lost to Louis in the May special election.

=== 2018 lieutenant gubernatorial campaign ===
In 2018, Williams challenged incumbent lieutenant governor Kathy Hochul in the Democratic primary for lieutenant governor, running on a platform of anti-corruption, affordable housing, and criminal justice reform. Williams and Cynthia Nixon, who challenged incumbent Governor Andrew Cuomo in the Democratic gubernatorial primary, endorsed each other. Williams lost the primary by less than seven points.

=== New York City Public Advocate (2019–present) ===
==== Elections ====
Williams ran in the 2019 special election for New York City Public Advocate to fill the vacancy created by Letitia James, who became New York state attorney general, until at least December 31, 2019. The New York Times endorsed him in both his 2018 campaign for lieutenant governor and his 2019 campaign for public advocate. The New York City chapter of Democratic Socialists of America endorsed him in 2018, but in 2019 did not endorse anyone for public advocate. The New York Daily News broke the story of his 2009 arrest in a domestic dispute, publishing records that had been sealed, which were used by rival candidates.

In a crowded field with 18 other candidates, including former council speaker Melissa Mark-Viverito and state assemblyman Michael Blake, Williams won, with 33% of the vote to Mark-Viverito's 11% and Blake's 8%. Republican Eric Ulrich received 19%. In his post-election remarks Williams said that he would work with Mayor de Blasio. He was certified and sworn into office on March 19, 2019. In the subsequent general election in November 2019, Williams ran for re-election as the Democratic candidate, winning with 77.8% of the vote to finish out the remaining two years of James' four-year term.

Williams was re-elected to a full four-year term in the 2021 election, winning by a wide margin against Republican candidate Devi Nampiaparampil. In the 2025 election, he was re-elected to a third term.

==== Tenure ====
If New York City Mayor Eric Adams had resigned or been removed from office due to ongoing criminal investigations into his administration, Williams would have become interim mayor until a special election could select a new mayor. However, on April 2, 2025, Southern District of New York Judge Dale Ho granted the government's motion to dismiss the case in its entirely, and did so with prejudice (which the government had not sought) such that the case can never be brought again against Mayor Adams. Adams did not resign prior to the end of his term.

In 2024, Williams said he was against a proposed zoning change that would have eliminated parking mandates for new housing units.

=== 2022 gubernatorial campaign ===
On September 28, 2021, Williams announced the formation of an exploratory committee to seek the Democratic nomination for governor in 2022. On November 16, 2021, Williams formally announced his bid for governor. His campaign "failed to gain much momentum" in advance of the primary, lagging far behind Governor Kathy Hochul in fundraising. Though Williams was "careful not to blame his campaign woes on it," he admitted that his wife's recent cancer diagnosis and the premature birth of his daughter three months prior had "curtailed his campaigning." Williams finished second in the June 2022 Democratic primary, losing to Hochul by a wide margin. While Williams initially received the support of the Working Families Party, the party dropped him from the ballot and endorsed Hochul following the June primary.

=== Activism ===
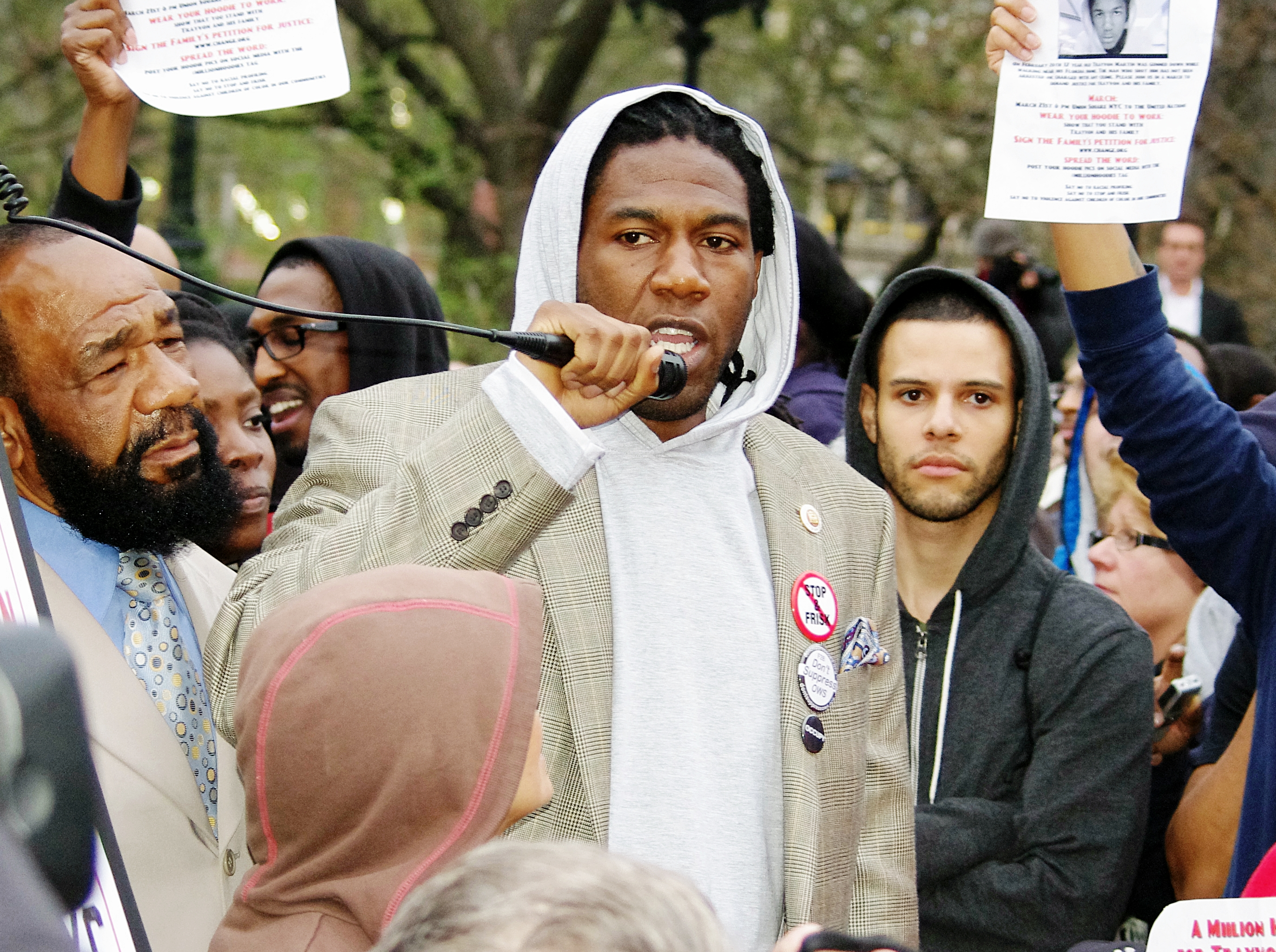
Williams speaks at a 2012 protest following the killing of Trayvon Martin

On September 5, 2011, during the West Indian Day Parade in Brooklyn, Williams and Kirsten John Foy, director of community relations for then-New York City Public Advocate Bill de Blasio, were arrested and handcuffed for being disorderly along with a crowd.

Williams was a supporter of the Occupy Wall Street movement, and in September 2012 was assaulted by a member of the NYPD at an Occupy Wall Street event.

Williams was also arrested in 2018 for protesting the detention of immigrant-rights activist Ravi Ragbir after Ragbir was detained during one of his regular check-ins with ICE.

== Personal life ==
Williams was diagnosed with attention deficit hyperactivity disorder (ADHD) and Tourette syndrome as a child and has advocated for people with those conditions.

Williams is a Baptist.

Williams was arrested in 2009 following a domestic assault charge. The charges were eventually dropped.

== Electoral history ==
Election history
Office	Year	Election	Results
NYC Council District 45	2009	Primary, Democratic	√ Jumaane D. Williams 36.50% Kendall Stewart 25.48% Sam Taitt 16.56% Dexter A. McKenzie 11.56% Ernest Emmanuel 5.73% Erlene King 4.18%
NYC Council District 45	2009	General	√ Jumaane D. Williams (D) 76.65% Kendall Stewart (I) 17.25% Salvatore Grupico (R) 6.11%
NYC Council District 45	2013	Primary, Democratic	√ Jumaane D. Williams 76.51% Godwin B. Williams 12.40% Jean H. Similien 11.09%
NYC Council District 45	2013	General	√ Jumaane D. Williams (D) 96.28% Erlene King (Rent Is Too Damn High) 3.17%
Lieutenant Governor of New York	2018	Primary, Democratic	√ Kathy Hochul (D) 53.4% Jumaane D. Williams (D) 46.6%
New York City Public Advocate	2019	Special	√ Jumaane D. Williams 33% Eric Ulrich 19% Melissa Mark-Viverito 11% Michael Blake 8% 15 others together 29%
New York City Public Advocate	2019	General	√ Jumaane D. Williams (D) 78% Joe Borelli (R, C) 20% Devin Balkind (L) 2%
New York City Public Advocate	2021	General	√ Jumaane D. Williams (D) 68% Devi Nampiaparampil (R) 23% Anthony Herbert (C) 6%
Governor of New York	2022	Primary, Democratic	√ Kathy Hochul (D) 67.4% Jumaane D. Williams (D) 19.3% Thomas Suozzi 13.0%

Political offices
Preceded by Kendall Stewart	Member of the New York City Council from the 45th district 2010–2019	Succeeded by Farah Louis
Preceded by Corey Johnson; Acting	New York City Public Advocate; 2019–present	Incumbent
