= Eric Stevenson (politician) =

American politician (born 1966)

Eric A. Stevenson

Member of the New York State Assembly from the 79th district
- In office January 1, 2011 – January 13, 2014
- Preceded by: Michael Benjamin
- Succeeded by: Michael Blake

Personal details
- Born: September 1966 (age 59) Bronx, New York
- Party: Democratic
- Profession: Politician

Eric A. Stevenson (born September 1966) is an American politician and convicted felon from the state of New York. A Democrat, Stevenson represented the 79th district in the New York State Assembly. He forfeited his Assembly seat upon his 2014 conviction for bribery and extortion.

== Biography ==
A Democrat from the Bronx, Stevenson was first elected to the Assembly in 2010. He represented District 79.

On April 4, 2013, federal prosecutors announced that Stevenson had been charged with bribery, conspiracy, and other related charges. Prosecutors said that Stevenson had taken bribes in exchange for drafting, proposing, and agreeing to enact legislation to aid his co-defendants' businesses. Authorities said that a second, unidentified assemblyman who had cooperated in the corruption probe had been charged in a sealed indictment and would resign to avoid prosecution. That member was later identified by the media as Assemblyman Nelson Castro.

On January 13, 2014, Stevenson was convicted of bribery and extortion; as a result, he forfeited his Assembly seat. On May 21, 2014, he was sentenced to three years in prison.

In June 2019, Stevenson—despite his prior felony conviction—announced his congressional candidacy.

New York State Assembly
Preceded by Michael Benjamin	New York State Assembly; 79th District; 2011–2014	Succeeded by Michael Blake
