= Chantel Jackson =

American politician

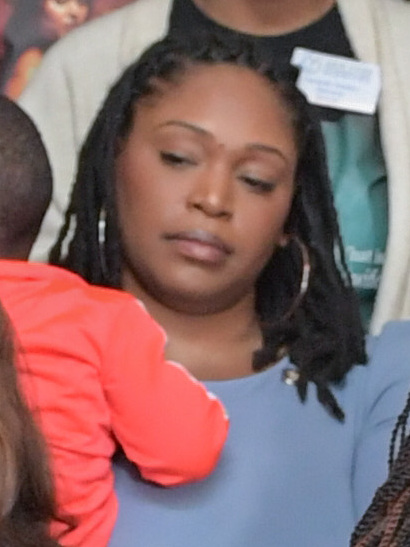

Member of the New York State Assembly from the 79th district
- Incumbent
- Assumed office January 1, 2021
- Preceded by: Michael Blake

Personal details
- Born: October 1, 1983 (age 43) New York City, New York, U.S.
- Party: Democratic
- Education: City College of New York (BA); Adelphi University (MSW)
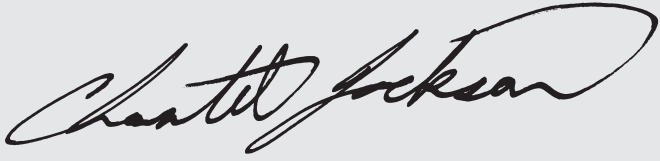
- Signature
- Website: Campaign website State Assembly website

Chantel S. Jackson (born October 1, 1983) an American politician and social worker serving as a member of the New York State Assembly from the 79th district. Elected in November 2020, Jackson assumed office on January 1, 2021.

== Early life and education ==
Jackson is a native of New York City, the daughter of an American father and an immigrant mother from Belize. Jackson earned a Bachelor of Arts degree in psychology from the City College of New York and a Master of Social Work from Adelphi University.

== Career ==
After receiving her master's degree, Jackson worked as a professor at the College of New Rochelle from 2014 to 2019. Since March 2016, she has been a social worker at the Academy for Careers in Television & Film, a technical school in Queens.

In 2020, after incumbent assemblymember Michael Blake announced his candidacy for New York's 15th congressional district, Jackson declared her candidacy for the 79th district of the New York State Assembly. Jackson received Blake's endorsement and defeated the Bronx Democratic Party-endorsed candidate, Cynthia Cox, and four other candidates with 26% of the vote in the Democratic primary. She won the November general election in the heavily Democratic district.
