= Gotham Gazette =

- Website type: News website
- Available in: English
- Owner: Citizens Union Foundation
- Website: www.gothamgazette.com
- Commercial: No
- Launched: 1999; 27 years ago

The Gotham Gazette is an online publication of the Citizens Union Foundation of the City of New York, a government watchdog group focusing on issues confronting New York City. Its purpose is fourfold: it reports daily on New York City news, it provides a digest of news items relevant to New York City, it researches and recommends policies considered by the New York City Government, and it provides reference tools for students of the civic activities of New York. Its reference resources range from policy papers to indexes of proposed and passed legislation of the New York City Council. The Gotham Gazette was founded in 1999.

Its purpose, as mandated by the Citizens Unions Foundation, is to:

...organize and edit a new website that would provide one-stop shopping for persons interested in the public policies and civic life of New York City. The new website would accommodate a broad audience, from serious scholars and researchers to breakfast readers looking for a lively digest of news and commentary. The site would be non-ideological and non-partisan. It would involve and highlight leading community groups, civic associations, and educational institutions. Contributors from those organizations would be prominently featured. The website would be easy to use, enjoyable to read, fun to look at.
