= 2021 New York City Public Advocate election =

- November 2, 2021
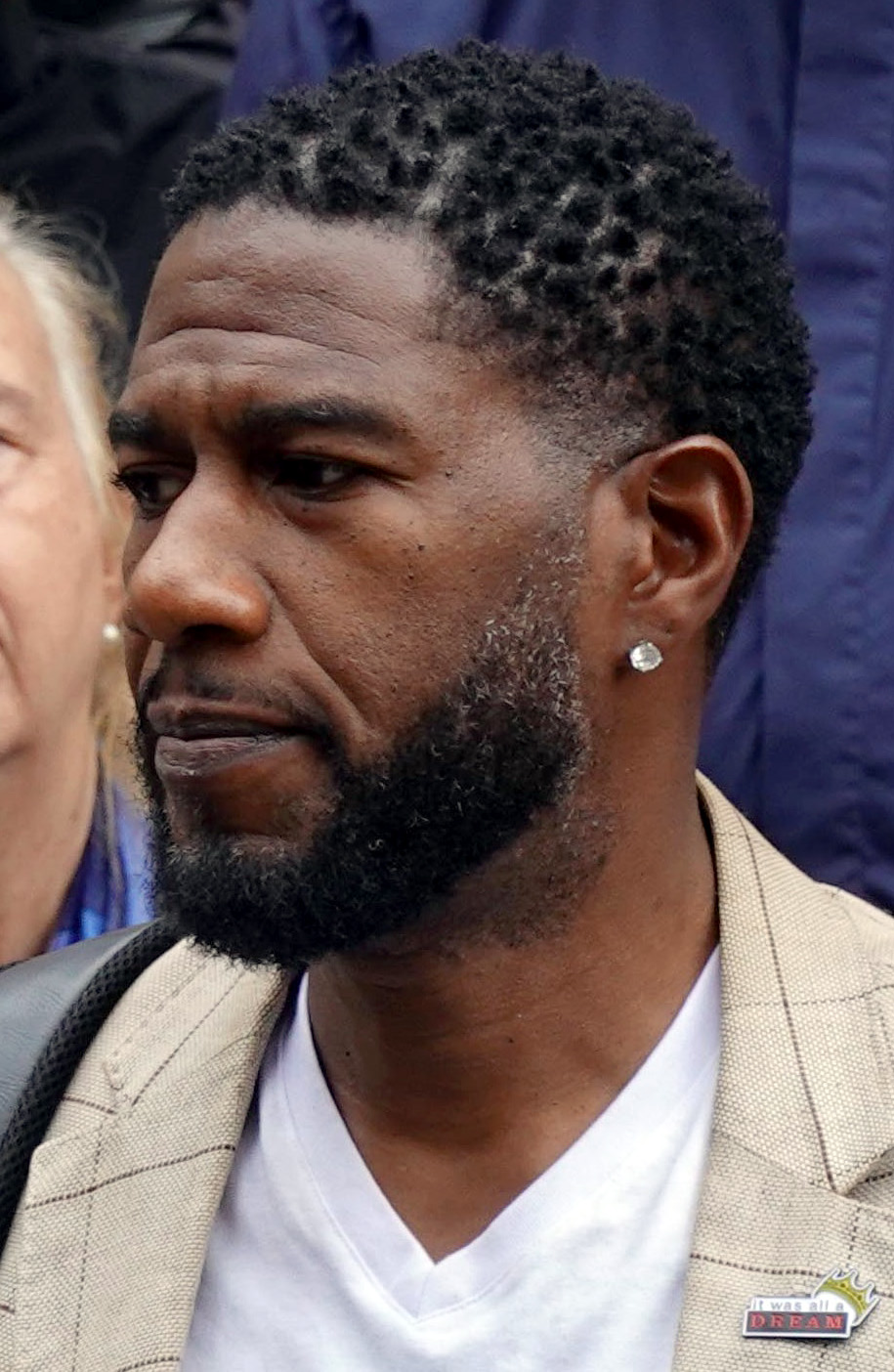

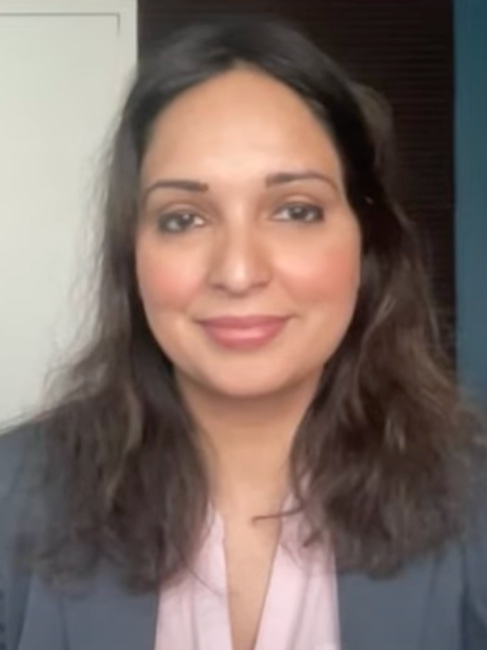

Candidate	Jumaane Williams	Devi Nampiaparampil	Anthony Herbert
Party	Democratic	Republican	Conservative
Alliance		Save Our City	Independent
Popular vote	744,183	254,491	73,943
Percentage	68.4%	23.4%	6.8%
- Williams: 30–40% 40–50% 50–60% 60–70% 70–80% 80–90% >90% Nampiaparampil: 30–40% 40–50% 50–60% 60–70% 70–80% 80–90% >90% Tie: 40–50% 50% No data
Public Advocate before election
Jumaane Williams
Democratic
Elected Public Advocate
Jumaane Williams
Democratic

The 2021 New York City Public Advocate election was held on November 2, 2021. The incumbent, Jumaane Williams, was re-elected. Williams defeated Dr. Devi Nampiaparampil, a physician running on the Republican party line in the general election.

== Democratic primary ==
=== Candidates ===
- Theo Chino, bitcoin entrepreneur
- Anthony Herbert, activist and consultant
- Jumaane Williams, incumbent

=== Primary election results ===

Williams

30–40%
40–50%
50–60%
60–70%
70–80%
80–90%
90–100%

Herbert

30–40%
40–50%
50–60%
60–70%
70–80%
90–100%

Chino

40–50%
50–60%
60–70%
90–100%

Other

30-40% tie
40-50% tie
50% tie
No votes

2021 New York City Public Advocate Primary Results
Party	Candidate	Votes	%
Democratic	Jumaane Williams (incumbent)	572,762	70.0%
Democratic	Anthony Herbert	173,858	21.2%
Democratic	Theo Chino	64,053	7.8%
Write-in		8,049	1.0%
Total votes		818,722	100.0%

== Republican Party ==
=== Candidate ===
- Devi Nampiaparampil, doctor and commentator

=== Endorsements ===
Devi Nampiaparampil

Organizations

- New York Young Republican Club

== Working Families Party ==
=== Candidate ===
==== Declared ====
- ~~Jumaane Williams~~ Petitions to be on the Working Families Party line were disqualified by the Board of Elections.

== General election ==
=== Candidates ===
- Devi Nampiaparampil (Save Our City)
- ~~Theo Chino (Black Woman Lead)~~ Petitions to be on the Black Woman Lead Party line were disqualified by the Board of Elections.
- ~~Theo Chino (Love)~~ Petitions to be on the Love Party line were disqualified by the Board of Elections.
- Devin W. Balkind (Libertarian)

=== Results ===
General election results
Party	Candidate	Votes	%	±%
Democratic	Jumaane Williams (incumbent)	744,183	68.4%	−9.4
Republican	Devi Nampiaparampil	250,823	23.1%	+6.1
Save Our City	Devi Nampiaparampil	3,668	0.3%	
Total	Devi Nampiaparampil	254,491	23.4%	
Conservative	Anthony Herbert	64,544	5.9%	+2.9
Independent	Anthony Herbert	9,399	0.9%	
Total	Anthony Herbert	73,943	6.8%	
Libertarian	Devin W. Balkind	14,352	1.3%	−0.7
Write-in		1701	0.2%	0.0
Total votes		1,088,670	100%	
Democratic hold				
