= Diane Gordon =

American politician

Diane Gordon is an American politician and a former member of the New York State Assembly who represented the East New York section of Brooklyn from 2001 to 2008.

== Political background ==
On July 10, 2006, Gordon was indicted by the office of the Brooklyn District Attorney, who filed charges alleging that the assemblywoman offered to help a contractor obtain a $2 million parcel of land from the city if he would build her a house. On April 8, 2008, she was convicted on eight of nine counts, including: Two counts of receiving bribes, two counts of official misconduct and two counts of receiving reward for official misconduct, automatically vacating her Assembly seat. On January 21, 2009, after six months of appeals, she began serving her two-to-six year jail term.

== Family ==
Diane Gordon has three children named Misha, Mireille, and Helen with one child who is deceased.

== Residence ==
Diane Gordon was born in Hemingway, South Carolina, and her home city is in Brooklyn, New York.

== Education ==
Diane Gordon received her education from the following institutions:

- BA, Business Administration, New York City Technical College, 1985
- Certified, Business Mathematics, American Business Institute
- Graduated, True Worship Bible Ministry School

== Organizations ==
Diane Gordon has been a member of the following organizations:

- Vice-President, Women Mentoring Ministry, True Worship Church, present
- Evangelist, True Worship Church, 1985–present
- Founder, Save Our Homes Organization of East New York, 1985
- Founder, Coalition of Clergymen, East New York Community

New York State Assembly
Preceded by Edward Griffith	New York State Assembly; 40th District; 2001-2008	Succeeded by Inez Barron
