= New York City Board of Elections =

American municipal body

Board of Elections in the City of New York (NYCBOE)

Agency overview
- Jurisdiction: New York City
- Headquarters: 32 Broadway New York, New York
- Employees: 920 (2020)
- Parent agency: New York State Board of Elections
- Key document: Election Law
- Website: vote.nyc

The Board of Elections in the City of New York (NYCBOE) conducts New York elections within New York City, United States. It is an administrative body of ten Commissioners, two from each borough upon recommendation by both political parties and then appointed by the New York City Council for a term of four years.

The NYCBOE has a longstanding history of nepotism and dysfunction. The structure of the NYCBOE is enshrined in the New York state constitution. One of New York state's last sources of patronage jobs, the NYCBOE is run in a bipartisan manner, as each job position held by a Democrat must have a duplicated position for a Republican. The staff in the organization are political appointees rather than professional staff.

== History and criticism ==
The Board has come under fire for errors and mismanagement in a number of elections:

- After a closely fought special election for the state Senate in March 2012, two good-government groups, Common Cause New York and New York Public Interest Research Group, criticized the Board for a "byzantine" and "excruciating" vote-counting process attributable to "a paper-and-scissors, multiple-person process the city Board of Elections says it must, by state law, follow for vote tabulating and reporting." Similar complaints were raised following the June 2012 primary election, especially with respect to delays in accurate vote-counting and reporting for the closely fought New York's 13th congressional district Democratic primary. The election issues, which came after the Board's Manhattan headquarters were shut down by Hurricane Sandy, were criticized by the news media and the public, as well as Mayor Michael Bloomberg (who called the Board "worse than The Gang That Couldn't Shoot Straight"). Board members lamented the issues and decided to work to seek improvements to its processes, although they also rejected criticism as unfair.
- During the April 2016 primary election, many Brooklyn voters were surprised and angered to learn that they had been purged from the voting rolls (their voter registrations were canceled). The board's chief clerk in Brooklyn was suspended shortly after the primary. City Comptroller Scott M. Stringer and State Attorney General Eric T. Schneiderman both opened investigations against the board, and in November 2016, Common Cause New York filed a lawsuit against the Board. The U.S. Department of Justice and the New York State Attorney General's Office both subsequently moved to join the lawsuit. The lawsuit alleged that the Board had improperly carried out a voter purge in late 2013 or early 2014 that violated federal law. The purge affected some 125,000 Democratic voters. It aimed to remove people who had not voted since 2008 from the voter rolls, but the lawsuit alleged that (1) the Board had failed to check whether the removed persons had died or moved out of the city, as required by federal law and (2) more than 4,100 of the voters flagged for removal had in fact voted at least once since 2008. In November 2017, the Board settled the lawsuit, entering into a consent decree in which the Board admitted that the purges were unlawful and agreed to reform and monitoring dealing with voter registration, list maintenance, and staff training; the Board also agreed "to review every voter registration cancelled since July 1, 2013, determine whether the cancellations were justified under law, and reinstate, to appropriate status, any registrations that were improperly cancelled."
- In September 2020, the Board was criticized after up to 100,000 Brooklyn voters received absentee ballots with incorrect names and addresses. The error involved "mismatched names and addresses on the outer and inner mail-back envelopes" and was attributed to a vendor's printing error. The mayor and voters criticized the BOE for the failure.
- In the 2021 New York City Democratic mayoral primary, the Board of Elections erroneously included 135,000 test ballots in the initial preliminary, unofficial release of ranked-choice voting results. After the error was identified, the BOE took down the faulty tabulations.

== Role and responsibilities ==
The Board of Elections in the City of New York, as provided under Election Law § 3-200, is responsible for conducting elections, including primary, special and general elections; handling voter registration and the maintenance of voter records; handling candidate petitions, documents, and campaign finance disclosures; and conducting voter outreach and education.

== Organization and structure ==
The Board is made up of ten commissioners, two from each of the five boroughs of New York City, appointed by the City Council for four-year terms. One member from each borough is appointed by each of the two parties whose candidates got the most votes in the last gubernatorial election. Since the top two candidates in the last election represented the Republican Party and the Democratic Party, the Republican Party and the Democratic Party get five representatives each on the Board of Elections. The ten Commissioners meet once a week. Day-to-day operations of the BOE are led by an appointed Executive Director and Deputy Executive Director, who oversee a "similar bipartisan arrangement of over 351 deputies, clerks and other personnel ensures that no one party controls the Board of Elections."

The Board of Elections is one of New York state's last sources of traditional patronage jobs. City & State notes, "The Board of Elections is unique in that it is one of the city's few truly bipartisan administrative bodies, with five commissioners from each party overseeing its operations. While members consider this structure the best way to run fair and balanced elections, others contend that it engenders gridlock, as commissioners from both parties are not necessarily working toward a common interest but instead trying to ensure that the elections play out in their party's favor." For example, former state Assemblyman Michael Benjamin, who formerly was an elections clerk in the Bronx, "said that he witnessed firsthand the hyperpartisan nature of the board when two deputy clerks in Brooklyn and Staten Island gave conflicting instructions to their staff and refused to work together, creating confusion on the ground level" that inhibited the ability of the mayor and City Council to trust the Board to properly use funding.

Efforts to reform the BOE have failed, in part because modifying its state structure would require changes to the state Constitution. The mayor has no power over the BOE. Mayor Michael Bloomberg was a vocal critic of the Board, which was the subject of complaints over its administration of elections; Bloomberg called for the Board to become a mayoral agency rather than an independent body.

== List of commissioners ==
Current commissioners
Borough	Commissioner	Commissioner
Manhattan	Jenny Low (D)	Frederic M. Umane (R)
The Bronx	Jodi Morales (D)	Gino A. Marmorato (R)
Brooklyn	Rodney L. Pepe-Souvenir (D) (President)	Simon Shamoun (R) (Secretary)
Queens	Jose Miguel Araujo (D)	Keith Sullivan (R)
Staten Island	Patricia Anne Taylor (D)	Michael J. Coppotelli (R)

== See also ==
- New York State Board of Elections
- List of electronic voting machines in New York state
