= New York City Public Advocate =

Municipal official

Public Advocate of New York City
- Seal of the City of New York

- Flag of the City of New York

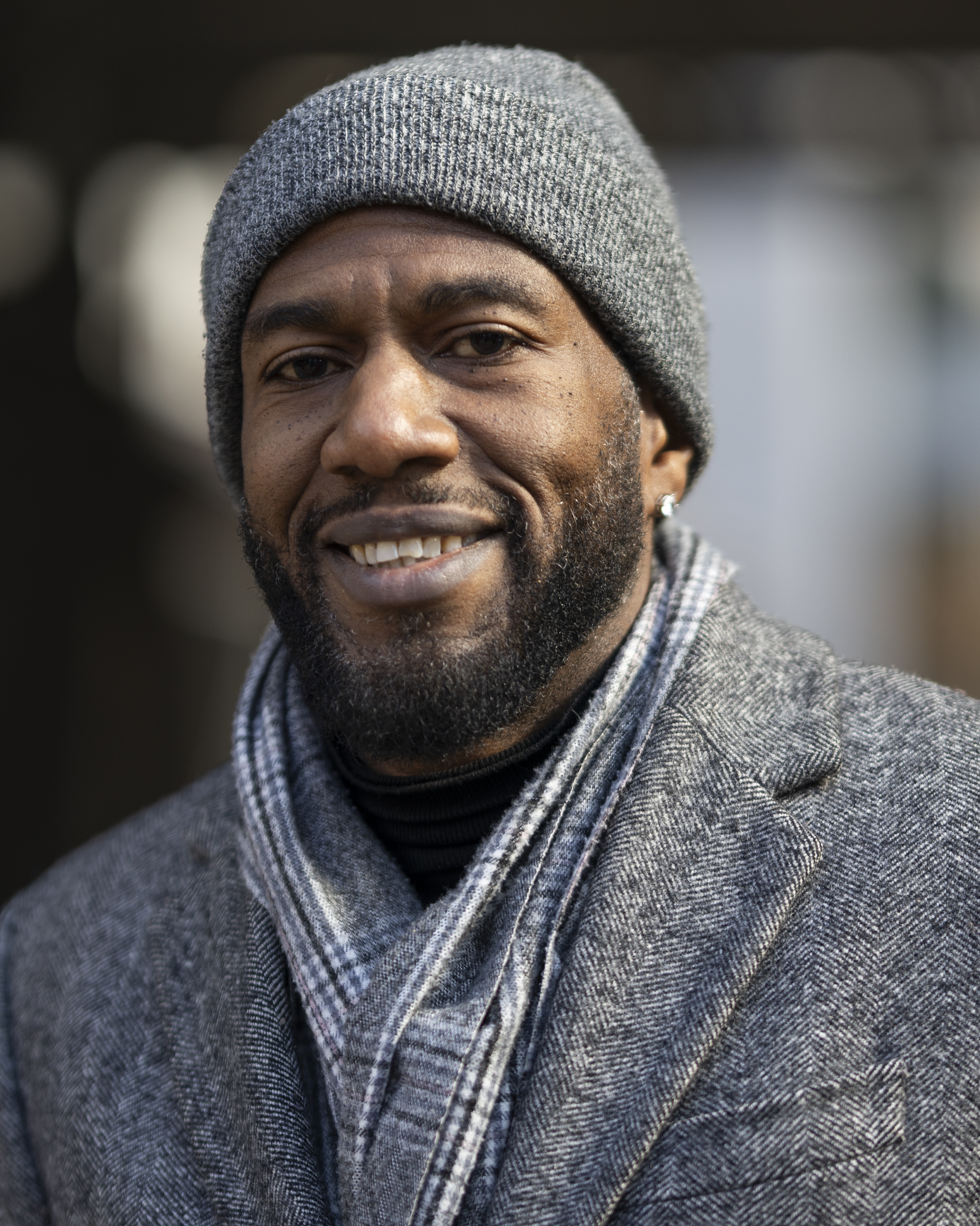
- Incumbent; Jumaane Williams since March 19, 2019
- Term length: 4 years; may serve two consecutive terms
- Inaugural holder: Mark Green
- Formation: 1993
- Succession: First in the New York City mayoral line of succession
- Deputy: First Deputy Public Advocate, Vacant
- Salary: $184,800 (2024)
- Website: Official website

The New York City public advocate (formerly president of the City Council) is a citywide elected position in New York City, which is first in line to succeed the mayor. The office serves as a direct link between the electorate and city government, effectively acting as an ombudsman, or watchdog, for New Yorkers.

== History ==
The office was created in 1993, when the New York City Council voted to rename the position of president of the city council. Following the city charter revision of 1989 which eliminated the powerful New York City Board of Estimate on which the president held a seat, the post was seen as largely ceremonial; its only notable responsibility was to cast the deciding vote in the city council in the unlikely event of a tie, a power that was eliminated in 2001. At the time, it was thought likely that the post would be abolished altogether. The position survived, and has been held by Democrats throughout its history. Mark Green was the first public advocate and served through his unsuccessful run for Mayor in 2001.

Also in 2001, the city council amended the city charter to transfer the public advocate's functions as presiding officer of the city council to a Speaker elected from among the council members. Green's successor, Betsy Gotbaum, thus had her role limited to being the city's de facto ombudsman. The 2009 election to succeed Gotbaum was highly competitive and was won by Bill de Blasio, who later became the first public advocate to win the mayor's office.

The current public advocate is Jumaane Williams, following a special election on February 26, 2019.

== Duties ==
The public advocate is a non-voting member of the New York City Council with the right to introduce and co-sponsor legislation. Prior to a 2002 charter revision, the public advocate was also the presiding officer of the council. The public advocate also serves as an ombudsman for city government, providing oversight for city agencies, investigating citizens' complaints about city services and making proposals to address perceived shortcomings or failures of those services. These duties, worded somewhat ambiguously, are laid out in section 24 of the city charter. The public advocate serves on the committee which selects the director of the New York City Independent Budget Office and appoints members to several boards and commissions, including one member of the New York City Planning Commission. The public advocate also serves as chairman of the Commission of Public Information and Communication established by section 1061 of the New York City Charter.

Along with the mayor and the comptroller, the public advocate is one of three municipal offices elected by all the city's voters. In the event of a vacancy or incapacity of the mayor, the public advocate is first in line to become mayor.

== List of New York City public advocates ==
No.	Image	Name	Term of office	Party affiliation	Notes
1		Mark Green	January 1, 1994 – December 31, 2001	Democratic	elected to two four-year terms; ran for mayor of New York City but lost
2		Betsy Gotbaum	January 1, 2002 – December 31, 2009	Democratic	elected to two four-year terms; did not run for re-election
3		Bill de Blasio	January 1, 2010 – December 31, 2013	Democratic	elected to one four-year term; ran for mayor of New York City, and won
4		Letitia James	January 1, 2014 – December 31, 2018	Democratic	elected to two four-year terms; resigned one year into her second term to take her elected position as attorney general of New York State
—		Corey Johnson (acting)	January 1, 2019 – March 19, 2019	Democratic	became the acting public advocate upon James being sworn in as attorney general of the state of New York
5		Jumaane Williams	March 19, 2019 – present	Democratic	won the 2019 New York City Public Advocate special election; re-elected to two four-year terms

== See also ==
- New York City Council#Presiding officers since 1898
- 2009 New York City Public Advocate election
- 2013 New York City Public Advocate election
- 2019 New York City Public Advocate special election
- 2021 New York City Public Advocate election
- 2025 New York City Public Advocate election
