= 2013 New York City mayoral election =

- November 5, 2013
- Registered: 4,245,309
- Turnout: 1,102,400; 25.96% (▼2.23 pp)

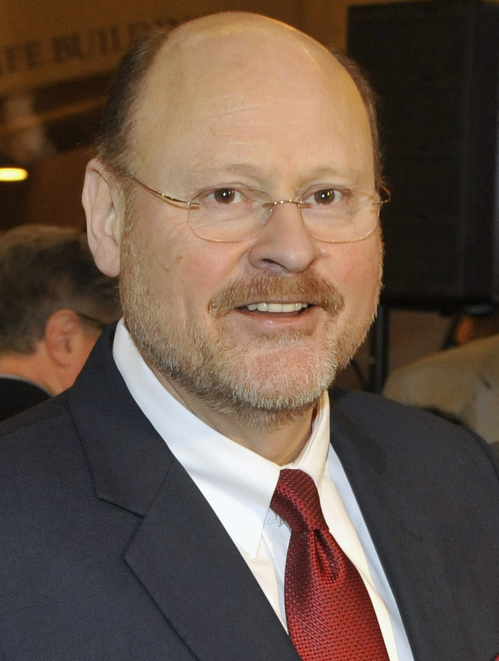
Nominee	Bill de Blasio	Joe Lhota
Party	Democratic	Republican
Alliance	Working Families	Conservative
Popular vote	795,679	264,420
Percentage	73.15%	24.31%
- de Blasio: 40–50% 50–60% 60–70% 70–80% 80–90% >90% Lhota: 40–50% 50–60% 60–70% 70–80% 80–90% >90% No data
Mayor before election
Michael Bloomberg
Independent
Elected Mayor
Bill de Blasio
Democratic

An election for the mayor of New York City occurred on November 5, 2013, along with elections for comptroller, public advocate, borough president, and members of the New York City Council. The incumbent mayor, Michael Bloomberg, a Republican-turned-independent, was term-limited and thus unable to seek re-election to a fourth term in office.

Primary elections were held on September 10, 2013. The Republican nominee was former Metropolitan Transportation Authority Chairman Joe Lhota. New York City Public Advocate Bill de Blasio was the Democratic nominee. De Blasio was elected mayor with 73.15% of the vote, becoming the first Democrat to win a mayoral election in the city since 1989. Democrats flipped back the boroughs of Manhattan and Queens.

== Background ==
Republican and Republican-endorsed candidates had won five successive mayoral elections in New York City. Republican Rudy Giuliani was elected in 1993 and re-elected in 1997. Republican Michael Bloomberg was then elected in 2001 and re-elected in 2005. He left the Republican Party in 2007, and successfully persuaded the city council to extend the city's term limits law so that he could run for a third term. He was re-elected as an independent on the Republican and Independence/Jobs & Education ballot lines in 2009. The term limits law was subsequently changed by a referendum in 2010, reverting the limit to two terms.

== Democratic primary ==
As the campaign started, early polling showed City Council Speaker Christine Quinn as the frontrunner. However, she was hampered by running what was widely viewed as a poor campaign, and by her connections to incumbent mayor Bloomberg. As Quinn declined in the polls, former U.S. Representative Anthony Weiner became the new frontrunner, helped by his popularity with women voters. However, Weiner's campaign collapsed after it was revealed that he had continued to engage in sexting after he had resigned from Congress due to a previous sexting scandal. After this development, New York City Public Advocate Bill de Blasio surged in the polls, helped by several ads featuring de Blasio's interracial family, especially his son Dante, and by a campaign focusing on inequality, with de Blasio frequently referencing the novel A Tale of Two Cities. A week prior to the election, de Blasio was considered the frontrunner, and his campaign was given a boost when Mayor Bloomberg described it as "racist," outraging Democratic voters and causing them to rally around de Blasio's campaign.

=== Candidates ===
==== Declared ====
- Sal Albanese, former New York City councilman
- Ceceilia Berkowitz, social media journalist
- Randy Credico, comedian and former director of the William Moses Kunstler Fund for Racial Justice
- Bill de Blasio, New York City public advocate
- John Liu, New York City comptroller
- Christine Quinn, speaker of the New York City Council
- Erick Salgado, pastor of the Church of Iglesia Jovenes Cristianos
- Bill Thompson, former New York City comptroller and nominee for mayor in 2009
- Anthony Weiner, former U.S. representative for New York's 9th congressional district

==== Withdrew ====
- Tom Allon, CEO of Manhattan Media and former New York City public school teacher (initially declared as a Democrat; then withdrew and declared as a Republican; also received the nomination of the Liberal Party, before dropping out entirely)

==== Declined ====
- Alec Baldwin, actor
- William J. Bratton, former commissioner of the New York City Police Department
- Hillary Clinton, former United States secretary of state and former U.S. senator
- Rubén Díaz Jr., Bronx borough president
- Gregory Floyd, president of the New York City Teamsters union
- Leo Hindery, businessman
- Eva Moskowitz, CEO of the Success Academy Charter Schools and former New York City councilwoman
- Ed Rendell, former governor of Pennsylvania
- Scott Stringer, borough president of Manhattan (ran for comptroller)
- Merryl Tisch, chancellor of the New York State Board of Regents
- Christopher O. Ward, former director of the Port Authority of New York and New Jersey
- Mortimer Zuckerman, businessman

==== Graphical summary ====
View source data.

=== Polling ===
Poll source	Date(s) administered	Sample size	Margin of error	Sal Albanese	Tom Allon	Bill de Blasio	John Liu	Marty Markowitz	Christine Quinn	Erick Salgado	Scott Stringer	Bill Thompson	Anthony Weiner	Other	Undecided
PPP	September 7–8, 2013	683	± 3.8%	3%	—	38%	5%	—	13%	2%	—	19%	9%	2%	10%
Quinnipiac	September 6–8, 2013	782	± 3.5%	1%	—	39%	4%	—	18%	—	—	25%	6%	—	8%
Marist	September 3–6, 2013	556	± 4.2%	1%	—	36%	5%	—	20%	1%	—	20%	7%	3%	8%
Quinnipiac	August 28 – September 1, 2013	750	± 3.6%	1%	—	43%	4%	—	18%	—	—	20%	7%	1%	8%
amNewYork	August 22–27, 2013	600	± 4%	1%	—	29%	5%	—	17%	1%	—	24%	10%	—	13%
Quinnipiac	August 22–27, 2013	602	± 4%	1%	—	36%	6%	—	21%	—	—	20%	8%	—	9%
Siena	August 19–28, 2013	505	± 4%	1%	—	32%	3%	—	17%	1%	—	18%	11%	—	16%
Marist	August 12–14, 2013	355	± 5.2%	1%	—	24%	5%	—	24%	2%	—	18%	11%	4%	12%
Quinnipiac	August 7–12, 2013	579	± 4.1%	1%	—	30%	6%	—	24%	—	—	22%	10%	—	7%
Quinnipiac	August 7–12, 2013	579	± 4.1%	1%	—	32%	7%	—	25%	—	—	25%	—	—	9%
Siena	August 2–7, 2013	505	± 4%	1%	—	14%	4%	—	25%	3%	—	16%	10%	—	26%
Quinnipiac	July 24–28, 2013	446	± 4.6%	2%	—	21%	6%	—	27%	—	—	20%	16%	—	7%
Quinnipiac	July 24–28, 2013	446	± 4.6%	2%	—	25%	9%	—	30%	—	—	25%	—	—	8%
Marist	July 24, 2013	551	± 4.2%	1%	—	14%	7%	—	25%	2%	—	14%	16%	2%	19%
Marist	July 24, 2013	551	± 4.2%	1%	—	16%	9%	—	32%	2%	—	17%	—	2%	20%
Quinnipiac	July 18–23, 2013	507	± 4.4%	1%	—	15%	7%	—	22%	—	—	20%	26%	—	8%
Quinnipiac	July 18–23, 2013	507	± 4.4%	2%	—	21%	10%	—	30%	—	—	26%	—	1%	11%
Siena	July 9–15, 2013	610	± 4%	2%	—	11%	7%	—	27%	1%	—	11%	18%	0%	24%
Quinnipiac	July 8–14, 2013	738	± 3.6%	1%	—	10%	7%	—	22%	—	—	11%	25%	1%	23%
Quinnipiac	June 19–25, 2013	830	± 3.4%	0%	—	10%	7%	—	19%	—	—	16%	17%	1%	28%
Marist	June 17–21, 2013	689	± 4%	1%	—	10%	8%	—	20%	2%	—	13%	25%	3%	18%
Marist	May 22–24, 2013	492	± 4.4%	1%	—	12%	8%	—	24%	<1%	—	11%	19%	1%	23%
Quinnipiac	April 15–18, 2013	740	± 3.6%	—	—	11%	9%	—	28%	—	—	10%	15%	1%	27%
Marist	April 11–15, 2013	873	± 3.3%	2%	—	11%	12%	—	26%	—	—	11%	15%	1%	22%
Marist	April 11–15, 2013	873	± 3.3%	2%	—	15%	11%	—	30%	—	—	14%	—	2%	26%
Quinnipiac	April 3–8, 2013	925	± 3.2%	—	—	14%	7%	—	32%	—	—	13%	—	2%	32%
Quinnipiac	February 20–25, 2013	655	± 3.8%	—	—	14%	9%	—	37%	—	—	11%	—	—	29%
Marist	February 4–12, 2013	875	± 3.3%	2%	—	12%	9%	—	37%	—	—	13%	—	1%	26%
Quinnipiac	January 8–14, 2013	879	± 3.3%	—	—	11%	9%	—	35%	—	—	10%	—	1%	33%
Quinnipiac	November 14–18, 2012	1,165	± 2.9%	—	—	9%	5%	—	32%	—	4%	10%	—	1%	37%
NY1-Marist	October 3–7, 2012	453	± 4.6%	—	2%	8%	9%	—	23%	—	6%	15%	—	—	37%
Quinnipiac	August 8–12, 2012	1,298	± 2.7%	—	1%	9%	9%	—	29%	—	4%	10%	—	2%	34%
Quinnipiac	May 3–8, 2012	658	± 3.8%	—	2%	10%	7%	—	26%	—	4%	13%	—	2%	36%
NY1-Marist	April 10–17, 2012	402	± 5%	—	1%	10%	9%	—	32%	—	7%	12%	—	—	29%
Quinnipiac	March 6–11, 2012	964	± 3.2%	—	2%	9%	7%	15%	25%	—	7%	13%	—	5%	17%
Quinnipiac	December 7–12, 2011	1,242	± 2.8%	—	1%	8%	9%	16%	23%	—	6%	9%	—	5%	21%
Quinnipiac	October 12–16, 2011	1,068	± 3.0%	—	1%	8%	11%	17%	22%	—	7%	10%	—	5%	19%
Quinnipiac	July 19–25, 2011	1,234	± 2.8%	—	2%	8%	13%	15%	23%	—	5%	10%	—	3%	22%

==== Runoff ====
Hypothetical polling

Poll source	Date(s) administered	Sample size	Margin of error	Bill de Blasio	Bill Thompson	Other	Undecided
PPP	September 7–8, 2013	683	± 3.8%	53%	33%	—	14%
Marist	September 3–6, 2013	936	± 3.2%	50%	38%	—	12%
Quinnipiac	Aug. 28 – Sep 1, 2013	750	± 3.6%	56%	36%	2%	5%
Quinnipiac	August 22–27, 2013	602	± 4%	52%	36%	—	11%
Marist	August 12–14, 2013	355	± 5.2%	44%	36%	—	20%
Quinnipiac	August 7–12, 2013	579	± 4.1%	50%	41%	—	9%

Poll source	Date(s) administered	Sample size	Margin of error	Bill de Blasio	Christine Quinn	Other	Undecided
PPP	September 7–8, 2013	683	± 3.8%	67%	21%	—	12%
Marist	September 3–6, 2013	936	± 3.2%	56%	34%	—	10%
Quinnipiac	August 28 – September 1, 2013	750	± 3.6%	66%	25%	4%	5%
Quinnipiac	August 22–27, 2013	602	± 4%	59%	30%	—	11%
Marist	August 12–14, 2013	355	± 5.2%	44%	42%	—	14%
Quinnipiac	August 7–12, 2013	579	± 4.1%	54%	38%	—	8%
Marist	May 22–24, 2013	492	± 4.4%	30%	48%	—	22%

Poll source	Date(s) administered	Sample size	Margin of error	Bill de Blasio	Anthony Weiner	Other	Undecided
Quinnipiac	August 7–12, 2013	579	± 4.1%	72%	22%	—	6%

Poll source	Date(s) administered	Sample size	Margin of error	John Liu	Christine Quinn	Other	Undecided
Marist	May 22–24, 2013	492	± 4.4%	25%	53%	—	22%

Poll source	Date(s) administered	Sample size	Margin of error	Christine Quinn	Bill Thompson	Other	Undecided
Quinnipiac	August 28 – September 1, 2013	750	± 3.6%	33%	59%	3%	5%
Quinnipiac	August 22–27, 2013	602	± 4%	33%	57%	—	11%
Marist	August 12–14, 2013	355	± 5.2%	44%	43%	—	12%
Quinnipiac	August 7–12, 2013	579	± 4.1%	41%	51%	—	9%
Quinnipiac	July 24–28, 2013	446	± 4.6%	40%	50%	—	9%
Quinnipiac	July 18–23, 2013	507	± 4.4%	42%	51%	—	7%
Marist	May 22–24, 2013	492	± 4.4%	44%	34%	—	22%

Poll source	Date(s) administered	Sample size	Margin of error	Christine Quinn	Anthony Weiner	Other	Undecided
Quinnipiac	August 7–12, 2013	579	± 4.1%	60%	31%	—	10%
Quinnipiac	July 24–28, 2013	446	± 4.6%	60%	33%	—	7%
Quinnipiac	July 18–23, 2013	507	± 4.4%	46%	44%	—	9%
Marist	May 22–24, 2013	492	± 4.4%	48%	33%	—	18%

Poll source	Date(s) administered	Sample size	Margin of error	Bill Thompson	Anthony Weiner	Other	Undecided
Quinnipiac	August 7–12, 2013	579	± 4.1%	76%	20%	—	5%
Quinnipiac	July 24–28, 2013	446	± 4.6%	66%	28%	—	6%
Quinnipiac	July 18–23, 2013	507	± 4.4%	52%	41%	—	8%

=== Endorsements ===
Bill de Blasio

Cabinet officials

- Diane Ravitch, educator and former U.S. assistant secretary of education

Federal officials

- Yvette Clarke, U.S. representative, 9th congressional district
- Elizabeth Holtzman, former U.S. representative and city comptroller
- Jerry Nadler, U.S. representative

State executive officials

- Howard Dean, former governor of Vermont

State legislative officials

- Joseph Addabbo Jr., state senator
- Karim Camara, state assemblyman
- Martin Dilan, state senator
- Rafael Espinal, assemblyman
- Deborah Glick, assemblywoman
- Phil Goldfeder, state assemblyman
- Ruth Hassell-Thompson, state senator from the Bronx (Wakefield)
- Brad Hoylman, state senator
- Brian P. Kavanagh, state assemblyman from Manhattan
- Liz Krueger, state senator from Manhattan
- Guillermo Linares, former councilman and assemblymember
- Michael G. Miller, assemblyman
- Walter T. Mosley, assemblyman
- Kevin Parker, state senator
- Bill Perkins, state senator from Manhattan
- Gustavo Rivera, state senator
- Gabriela Rosa, assemblywoman
- Nily Rozic, assemblywoman
- James Sanders Jr., state senator from Queens
- Luis R. Sepúlveda, state assemblyman from the Bronx (Parkchester)
- Michael Simanowitz, assemblyman
- Daniel Squadron, state senator

Local officials

- Margaret Chin, councilwoman
- Erik Dilan, councilman
- Danny Dromm, councilman
- Mathieu Eugene, city councilman from Brooklyn
- Dan Garodnick, councilman
- Vincent J. Gentile, city councilman from Brooklyn
- Letitia James, councilqoman
- Brad Lander, city councilman from Brooklyn
- Steve Levin, councilman
- Melissa Mark-Viverito, city councilwoman from Manhattan
- Marty Markowitz, Brooklyn borough president
- Donovan Richards, councilman
- Ydanis Rodriguez, councilman
- James Vacca, councilman

Political candidates

- Corey Johnson, city council Democratic nominee
- Mark Levine, city council Democratic nominee
- Carlos Menchaca, city council Democratic nominee
- Antonio Reynoso, city council Democratic nominee
- Helen Rosenthal, city council Democratic nominee
- Kenneth P. Thompson, Democratic nominee for Brooklyn District Attorney
- Ritchie Torres, city council Democratic nominee

Newspapers and magazines

- The Nation

Labor unions

- Communications Workers of America District 1
- New York City Central Labor Council
- New York State American Nurses Association
- PSC CUNY
- Retail, Wholesale and Department Store Union
- SEIU 32BJ
- SEIU Local 1199, The National Health Care Workers Union, the city's largest trade union
- United Auto Workers Region 9A
- United Food and Commercial Workers Local 1500

Organizations

- Barack Obama Democratic Club of Upper Manhattan
- New York Communities for Change
- Planned Parenthood of NYC Political Committee
- Working Families Party

Individuals

- Alec Baldwin, actor
- Harry Belafonte, singer
- Steve Buscemi, actor
- Alan Cumming, actor
- Héctor Figueroa, president of the SEIU Local 32BJ
- Cynthia Nixon, actress
- Chris Noth, actor
- Sarah Jessica Parker, actress
- Jeffrey Sachs, economist
- Susan Sarandon, actress
- Al Sharpton, reverend
- Russell Simmons, businessman and celebrity
- George Soros, hedge fund manager
- Aida Turturro, actress
John Liu

State officials

- Inez Barron, state assemblywoman

Local officials

- Peter Koo, city councilman from Flushing

Labor unions

- Communications Workers of America Local 1180
- District Council 37
Christine Quinn

Federal officials

- Joe Crowley, U.S. representative from NY-14
- Carolyn Maloney, U.S. representative from NY-12

State officials

- Dan Quart, state assemblyman
- Matthew Titone, state assemblyman

Local officials

- Edward I. Koch, former mayor of New York City (deceased)
- Helen Marshall, Queens borough president
- Ruth Messinger, former Manhattan borough president

Newspapers

- New York Daily News
- The New York Times

Individuals

- Candice Bergen, actress and model
- Whoopi Goldberg, talk show host
- Loida Nicholas-Lewis, socialite
- Rob Reiner, actor, comedian and filmmaker
- Brooke Shields, actress and model
- Gloria Steinem, feminist writer and activist
- George Takei, actor
Erick Salgado

State officials

- Rubén Díaz Sr., state senator
Bill Thompson

Federal officials

- Alfonse D'Amato, former U.S. senator from New York (Republican)
- Hakeem Jeffries, U.S. representative, 8th congressional district
- Gregory Meeks, U.S. representative, 5th congressional district
- José E. Serrano, U.S. representative, 15th congressional district

Local officials

- Rubén Díaz Jr., Bronx borough president
- Herman D. Farrell Jr., state assemblyman, former head of the Manhattan Democratic Party
- Richard Ravitch, former lieutenant governor of New York
- José M. Serrano, state senator
- Merryl Tisch, New York Board of Regents

Labor unions

- UFT
Anthony Weiner

Individuals

- Jimmy McMillan, political activist and member of Rent Is Too Damn High Party

=== Debates ===
A debate was televised live on WABC on August 13.

2013 New York City mayoral election Democratic primary debates
No.	Date	Host	Moderator	Link	Democratic	Democratic	Democratic	Democratic	Democratic	Democratic	Democratic
Key: P Participant A Absent N Not invited I Invited W Withdrawn											
Key: P Participant A Absent N Not invited I Invited W Withdrawn					Sal Albanese	Bill de Blasio	John Liu	Christine Quinn	Erick Salgado	Bill Thompson	Anthony Weiner
1	Mar. 21, 2013	92NY; The New York Observer	Kenneth Fisher; Ken Kurson	YouTube	P	P	P	P	N	P	N
2	Aug. 21, 2013	Citizens Committee of New York; Citizens Union, Gothamist; Hispanic Federation, New York 1 New York 1 Noticias; New York City Campaign Finance Board; New York Newsday; Transportation Alternatives; Time Warner Cable, WNYC	Errol Louis	YouTube	P	P	P	P	P	P	P
3	Sep. 3, 2013	New York City Campaign Finance Board; Telemundo Nueva York; The Wall Street Journal, WNBC	Melissa Russo; David Ushery	YouTube	N	P	P	P	N	P	P

=== Results ===
Results by borough De Blasio: 30-40%; 40-50%

Results by state assembly district De Blasio: 20-30%; 30-40%; 40-50%; 50-60%; Thompson: 30-40%; Liu: 20-30%; 30-40%

2013 Democratic primary	Manhattan	The Bronx	Brooklyn	Queens	Staten Island	Total	%
Bill de Blasio	81,197	36,896	104,703	52,190	7,358	282,344	40.81%
Bill de Blasio	40.91%	38.12%	46.36%	34.96%	34.33%	282,344	40.81%
Bill Thompson	42,720	31,617	61,471	38,162	6,871	180,841	26.14%
Bill Thompson	21.53%	32.67%	27.22%	25.56%	32.06%	180,841	26.14%
Christine Quinn	52,102	10,392	23,007	19,847	3,545	108,893	15.74%
Christine Quinn	26.25%	10.74%	10.19%	13.29%	16.54%	108,893	15.74%
John Liu	10,191	4,753	13,927	16,977	1,438	47,286	6.84%
John Liu	5.14%	4.91%	6.17%	11.37%	6.71%	47,286	6.84%
Anthony Weiner	6,858	5,726	10,950	9,438	1,220	34,192	4.94%
Anthony Weiner	3.46%	5.92%	4.85%	6.32%	5.69%	34,192	4.94%
Erick Salgado	2,296	3,855	5,793	3,735	235	15,914	2.30%
Erick Salgado	1.16%	3.98%	2.57%	2.50%	1.10%	15,914	2.30%
Randy Credico	1,588	2,301	2,351	5,129	161	11,530	1.67%
Randy Credico	0.80%	2.38%	1.04%	3.44%	0.75%	11,530	1.67%
Sal Albanese	821	581	2,346	1,648	447	5,843	0.84%
Sal Albanese	0.41%	0.60%	1.04%	1.10%	2.09%	5,843	0.84%
Neil Grimaldi	634	640	1,108	2,157	138	4,677	0.68%
Neil Grimaldi	0.32%	0.66%	0.49%	1.44%	0.64%	4,677	0.68%
All write-in votes	50	18	172	21	20	281	0.04%
All write-in votes	0.03%	0.02%	0.08%	0.01%	0.09%	281	0.04%
Total	198,457	96,779	225,828	149,304	21,443	691,801	
Turnout	29.83%	19.30%	23.96%	21.58%	17.71%	23.67%	

== Republican primary ==
=== Candidates ===
==== Declared ====
- John Catsimatidis, businessman, owner of companies including the Red Apple Group, the Gristedes supermarket chain and the United Refining Company (received the Liberal Party nomination; then withdrew after losing the Republican primary)
- Joe Lhota, former chairman of the Metropolitan Transportation Authority (also received the Conservative Party nomination)
- George T. McDonald, founder of the Doe Fund

==== Withdrew ====
- Tom Allon, CEO of Manhattan Media and former New York City public school teacher (initially declared as a Democrat; then withdrew and declared as a Republican; also received the nomination of the Liberal Party, before dropping out entirely)
- Adolfo Carrión Jr., former director of the White House Office of Urban Affairs and former borough president of The Bronx (a Democrat-turned-Independent, Carrión tried unsuccessfully to receive a Wilson Pakula in order to run as a Republican; received the nomination of the Independence Party)
- Malcolm Smith, state senator, former lieutenant governor of New York and former majority leader of the New York State Senate (A Democrat, Smith would have had to change his party affiliation or receive a Wilson Pakula in order to run as a Republican. He and several others were arrested for trying to bribe Republican leaders to give him a Wilson Pakula.)

==== Declined ====
- A. R. Bernard, pastor
- Dan Donovan, Staten Island district attorney
- Rudy Giuliani, former mayor of New York City
- Kelsey Grammer, actor
- Richard Grasso, former chairman of the New York Stock Exchange
- Raymond Kelly, commissioner of the New York City Police Department
- Richard Parsons, chairman of Citigroup
- Edward Skyler, executive at Citigroup and former deputy mayor for operations
- Diana Taylor, former New York State Banking Department superintendent and partner of Mayor Bloomberg

==== Graphical summary ====
View source data.

=== Polling ===
Poll source	Date(s) administered	Sample size	Margin of error	Tom Allon	A. R. Bernard	Adolfo Carrión Jr.	John Catsimatidis	Joe Lhota	George McDonald	Other	Undecided
amNewYork	August 22–27, 2013	400	± 4.9%	—	—	—	28%	50%	5%	—	15%
Marist	August 12–14, 2013	132	± 8.5%	—	—	—	22%	33%	12%	2%	30%
Quinnipiac	August 7–12, 2013	?	± ?%	—	—	—	37%	43%	9%	—	11%
Quinnipiac	July 18–23, 2013	96	± 10%	—	—	—	35%	49%	7%	—	9%
Siena	July 9–15, 2013	125	± 8.8%	—	—	—	21%	32%	3%	1%	42%
Marist	June 17–21, 2013	123	± 9%	—	—	—	21%	28%	10%	1%	40%
Quinnipiac	April 3–8, 2013	188	± 7.5%	—	—	—	8%	23%	11%	2%	55%
Marist	February 4–12, 2013	172	± 7.5%	4%	2%	3%	5%	20%	8%	3%	55%
Quinnipiac	January 8–14, 2013	176	± 7.4%	5%	—	3%	9%	23%	2%	—	58%

=== Bribery scandal ===
On April 2, 2013, federal law enforcement officers arrested numerous New York City-area politicians. These included Democratic state senator Malcolm Smith and Republican City Councilman Dan Halloran, who were charged with trying to bribe various Republican political leaders so as to get Smith onto the ballot as a Republican. The mayor of Spring Valley and local Republican party leaders were also arrested.

=== Endorsements ===
John Catsimatidis

Federal officials

- Vito Fossella, former U.S. representative from Staten Island

State and territorial executive officials

- Luis Fortuño, former governor of Puerto Rico
- George E. Pataki, former governor of New York

State legislative officials

- Andrew Lanza, state senator
- Nicole Malliotakis, New York State assemblywoman
- Dean Skelos, majority leader of the New York State Senate

Organizations

- Liberal Party of New York

Individuals

- Donald Trump, businessman and media personality
Joe Lhota

Federal officials

- Michael Grimm, U.S. representative from NY-11
- Peter T. King, U.S. representative from NY-02

Local officials

- Charlie Gasparino, Fox Business Network reporter, deputy mayor during the Giuliani administration
- Rudy Giuliani, former mayor
- Daniel J. Halloran III, NYC Council member
- Vincent M. Ignizio, NYC Council member
- James Oddo, NYC Council member
- Eric Ulrich, NYC Council member

Newspapers

- Jewish Voice
- The New York Times
- Newsday and AM New York Metro

Organizations

- Bronx Republican Party
- Staten Island Republican Party

=== Debates ===
2013 New York City mayoral election Republican primary debates
No.	Date	Host	Moderator	Link	Republican	Republican	Republican
Key: P Participant A Absent N Not invited I Invited W Withdrawn							
Key: P Participant A Absent N Not invited I Invited W Withdrawn					John Catsimatidis	Joe Lhota	George McDonald
1	Mar. 21, 2013	92NY; The New York Observer	Kenneth Fisher; Ken Kurson	YouTube	P	P	P
2	Aug. 28, 2013	1010 WINS; Common Cause New York; El Diario La Prensa; New York City Campaign Finance Board; WCBS; WCBS Newsradio 880	Maurice Dubois	YouTube	P	P	P
3	Sep. 8, 2013	New York City Campaign Finance Board; Telemundo Nueva York; The Wall Street Journal; WNBC	Melissa Russo; David Ushery	YouTube	P	P	N

=== Results ===
Results by borough Lhota: 40–50%; 50–60%; 70–80%; Catsimatidis: 50–60%

Results by State Assembly district Lhota: 30–40%; 40–50%; 50–60%; 60–70%; 70–80%; Catsimatidis: 30–40%; 40–50%; 50–60%; Tie: 40–50%

2013 Republican primary	Manhattan	The Bronx	Brooklyn	Queens	Staten Island	Total	%
Joe Lhota	9,211	1,860	6,995	8,758	5,412	32,236	52.75%
Joe Lhota	70.49%	52.87%	47.59%	51.01%	42.76%	32,236	52.75%
John Catsimatidis	3,139	1,281	6,723	6,945	6,776	24,864	40.69%
John Catsimatidis	24.02%	36.41%	45.73%	40.45%	53.53%	24,864	40.69%
George McDonald	683	369	940	1,456	451	3,899	6.38%
George McDonald	5.23%	10.49%	6.39%	8.48%	3.56%	3,899	6.38%
All write-in votes	34	8	42	9	19	112	0.18%
All write-in votes	0.26%	0.23%	0.29%	0.05%	0.15%	112	0.18%
Total	13,067	3,518	14,700	17,168	12,658	61,111	
Turnout	13.65%	8.78%	12.48%	13.84%	16.42%	13.44%	

== Major third parties ==
Besides the Democratic and Republican parties, the Conservative, Green, Independence and Working Families parties are qualified New York parties. These parties have automatic ballot access.

=== Conservative ===
==== Nominee ====
- Joe Lhota, former chairman of the MTA

==== Unsuccessful ====
- George McDonald, founder of the Doe Fund
- Erick Salgado, pastor of the Church of Iglesia Jovenes Cristianos

=== Green ===
==== Nominee ====
- Anthony Gronowicz, activist, professor and nominee for mayor in 2005

=== Independence ===
==== Nominee ====
- Adolfo Carrión Jr., former director of the White House Office of Urban Affairs and former borough president of The Bronx

=== Working Families ===
==== Nominee ====
- Bill de Blasio, New York City public advocate

==== Unsuccessful ====
- John Liu, New York City comptroller
- Christine Quinn, speaker of the New York City Council

== Minor third parties ==
Any candidate not among the six qualified New York parties must petition their way onto the ballot; they do not face primary elections.

=== Affordable Tomorrow ===
==== Nominee ====
- Joseph Melaragno

=== Common Sense ===
==== Nominee ====
- Jack Hidary

=== Freedom ===
==== Nominee ====
- Michael K. Greys

=== Flourish Every Person ===
==== Nominee ====
- Michael J. Dilger

=== Jobs & Education ===
==== Nominee ====
- Jack Hidary

=== Liberal ===
After the party twice endorsed a candidate for mayor, only to see them withdraw from the race, the party declined to endorse a third candidate, although they did consider endorsing Jack Hidary.

==== Unsuccessful ====
- Jack Hidary

==== Withdrew ====
- Tom Allon, CEO of Manhattan Media and former New York City public school teacher (initially declared as a Democrat; then withdrew and declared as a Republican, also receiving the nomination of the Liberal Party, before dropping out entirely)
- Adolfo Carrión Jr., former director of the White House Office of Urban Affairs and former borough president of The Bronx
- John Catsimatidis, businessman, owner of companies including the Red Apple Group, the Gristedes supermarket chain and the United Refining Company (received the nomination after Allon withdrew, dropped out entirely after he lost the Republican primary to Joe Lhota)
- Joe Lhota, former chairman of the MTA

=== Libertarian ===
Joe Lhota was originally nominated as the Libertarian candidate during the party convention held on April 6, 2013, a nomination he declined. It was soon after ruled by the Libertarian Executive Committee that this nomination was invalid and void, due to the attending voters of this first convention not being properly credentialed. A second nominating convention was held on June 11, 2013, which nominated Michael Sanchez.

==== Nominee ====
- Michael Sanchez, activist

==== Unsuccessful ====
- Randy Credico, comedian and former director of the William Moses Kunstler Fund for Racial Justice

==== Withdrew ====
- Kristin M. Davis, former madam and Anti-Prohibition Party nominee for governor of New York in 2010 (running for Comptroller)
- Joe Lhota, former chairman of the MTA

=== Reform Party of New York City ===
==== Nominee ====
- Carl Person, attorney and Libertarian nominee for New York attorney general in 2010

=== Rent Is Too Damn High ===
==== Nominee ====
- Jimmy McMillan, party founder and perennial candidate

=== School Choice ===
==== Nominee ====
- Erick Salgado

=== Socialist Workers ===
==== Nominee ====
- Dan Fein, nominee for governor in 2010, mayor in 2009 and comptroller in 2005

=== Students First ===
==== Nominee ====
- Joe Lhota

=== Tax Wall Street ===
==== Nominee ====
- Randy Credico

=== Taxes 2 High ===
==== Nominee ====
- Joe Lhota

=== War Veterans ===
==== Nominee ====
- Sam Sloan, chess player, publisher and Libertarian candidate for governor in 2010

== Independent ==
=== Candidates ===
==== Unsuccessful ====
- Michael Post, sewage treatment worker

==== Declined ====
- Tony Danza, actor
- Raymond Kelly, commissioner of the New York City Police Department

== General election ==
=== Graphical summary ===
View source data.

=== Polling ===
Poll source	Date(s) administered	Sample size	Margin of error	Joe Lhota (R)	Bill de Blasio (D)	Adolfo Carrión Jr. (I)	Other	Undecided
Quinnipiac	October 25–29, 2013	728	± 3.6%	26%	65%	3%	—	7%
Siena	October 21–26, 2013	701	± 3.7%	23%	68%	—	3%	6%
Quinnipiac	October 16–20, 2013	973	± 3.1%	24%	68%	2%	—	5%
Penn Schoen Berland	October 15–19, 2013	801	± 3.46%	23%	64%	2%	2%	9%
Marist	October 6–8, 2013	1,305	± 4.4%	23%	67%	2%	1%	7%
Siena	September 28 – October 2, 2013	700	± 4%	19%	68%	2%	1%	10%
Quinnipiac	September 25 – October 1, 2013	1,198	± 2.8%	21%	71%	2%	1%	5%
Quinnipiac	September 15–18, 2013	891	± 3.3%	25%	66%	2%	1%	6%
Marist	September 15–16, 2013	1,216	± 3.9%	22%	65%	3%	1%	9%
Quinnipiac	April 15–18, 2013	1,161	± 2.9%	19%	59%	—	2%	21%
Quinnipiac	April 3–8, 2013	1,417	± 2.6%	18%	55%	—	2%	24%
Quinnipiac	February 20–25, 2013	1,017	± 3.1%	18%	58%	—	2%	22%
Marist	February 4–12, 2013	816	± 3.4%	18%	60%	—	—	22%
Quinnipiac	January 8–14, 2013	1,332	± 2.7%	17%	57%	—	1%	24%

Hypothetical polling

With Kelly

Poll source	Date(s) administered	Sample size	Margin of error	Raymond Kelly (R)	Bill de Blasio (D)	Other	Undecided
Quinnipiac	May 3–8, 2012	1,066	± 3%	34%	46%	1%	18%

Poll source	Date(s) administered	Sample size	Margin of error	Raymond Kelly (R)	Christine Quinn (D)	Other	Undecided
Quinnipiac	May 3–8, 2012	1,066	± 3%	33%	48%	3%	16%

Poll source	Date(s) administered	Sample size	Margin of error	Raymond Kelly (R)	Bill Thompson (D)	Other	Undecided
Quinnipiac	May 3–8, 2012	1,066	± 3%	34%	46%	2%	18%

With Lhota

Poll source	Date(s) administered	Sample size	Margin of error	Joe Lhota (R)	Sal Albanese (D)	Other	Undecided
Marist	February 4–12, 2013	816	± 3.4%	21%	52%	—	27%

Poll source	Date(s) administered	Sample size	Margin of error	Joe Lhota (R)	John Liu (D)	Other	Undecided
Quinnipiac	April 15–18, 2013	1,161	± 2.9%	22%	56%	2%	21%
Quinnipiac	April 3–8, 2013	1,417	± 2.6%	20%	52%	2%	25%
Quinnipiac	February 20–25, 2013	1,017	± 3.1%	22%	53%	2%	22%
Marist	February 4–12, 2013	816	± 3.4%	20%	56%	—	23%

Poll source	Date(s) administered	Sample size	Margin of error	Joe Lhota (R)	Christine Quinn (D)	Other	Undecided
Quinnipiac	April 15–18, 2013	1,161	± 2.9%	21%	60%	2%	17%
Quinnipiac	April 3–8, 2013	1,417	± 2.6%	19%	59%	2%	21%
Quinnipiac	February 20–25, 2013	1,017	± 3.1%	19%	63%	2%	16%
Marist	February 4–12, 2013	816	± 3.4%	18%	64%	—	18%
Quinnipiac	January 8–14, 2013	1,332	± 2.7%	17%	62%	1%	19%

Poll source	Date(s) administered	Sample size	Margin of error	Joe Lhota (R)	Bill Thompson (D)	Other	Undecided
Quinnipiac	April 15–18, 2013	1,161	± 2.9%	19%	55%	2%	23%
Quinnipiac	April 3–8, 2013	1,417	± 2.6%	17%	55%	2%	25%
Quinnipiac	February 20–25, 2013	1,017	± 3.1%	20%	55%	1%	24%
Marist	February 4–12, 2013	816	± 3.4%	19%	61%	—	20%
Quinnipiac	January 8–14, 2013	1,332	± 2.7%	19%	55%	2%	24%

Poll source	Date(s) administered	Sample size	Margin of error	Joe Lhota (R)	Anthony Weiner (D)	Other	Undecided
Quinnipiac	April 15–18, 2013	1,161	± 2.9%	26%	51%	2%	21%

Three-way race

Poll source	Date(s) administered	Sample size	Margin of error	Joe Lhota (R)	Christine Quinn (D)	Adolfo Carrión Jr. (I)	Other	Undecided
Marist	February 4–12, 2013	816	± 3.4%	17%	59%	8%	—	17%

Four-way race

Poll source	Date(s) administered	Sample size	Margin of error	Joe Lhota (R)	Bill de Blasio (D)	Adolfo Carrión Jr. (I)	Raymond Kelly (I)	Other	Undecided
Quinnipiac	February 4–12, 2013	816	± 3.4%	9%	35%	3%	27%	2%	22%

Poll source	Date(s) administered	Sample size	Margin of error	Joe Lhota (R)	Christine Quinn (D)	Adolfo Carrión Jr.(I)	Raymond Kelly (I)	Other	Undecided
Quinnipiac	February 4–12, 2013	816	± 3.4%	8%	38%	5%	25%	2%	23%

Poll source	Date(s) administered	Sample size	Margin of error	Joe Lhota (R)	Bill Thompson (D)	Adolfo Carrión Jr.(I)	Raymond Kelly (I)	Other	Undecided
Quinnipiac	February 4–12, 2013	816	± 3.4%	8%	38%	4%	25%	2%	23%

Poll source	Date(s) administered	Sample size	Margin of error	Joe Lhota (R)	Anthony Weiner (D)	Adolfo Carrión Jr.(I)	Raymond Kelly (I)	Other	Undecided
Quinnipiac	February 4–12, 2013	816	± 3.4%	10%	36%	4%	27%	2%	22%

Open primary

Poll source	Date(s) administered	Sample size	Margin of error	Tom Allon (R)	Bill de Blasio (D)	Raymond Kelly (R)	John Liu (D)	Marty Markowitz (D)	Christine Quinn (D)	Scott Stringer (D)	Bill Thompson (D)	Other	Undecided
Quinnipiac	December 7–12, 2011	1,242	± 2.8%	0%	6%	24%	7%	13%	18%	5%	7%	4%	15%
Quinnipiac	October 12–16, 2011	1,068	± 3.0%	0%	6%	25%	10%	14%	17%	5%	8%	4%	12%
Quinnipiac	July 19–25, 2011	1,234	± 2.8%	1%	6%	23%	10%	12%	18%	4%	8%	2%	16%

=== Debates ===
2013 New York City mayoral election debates
No.	Date	Host	Moderator	Link	Democratic	Republican
Key: P Participant A Absent N Not invited I Invited W Withdrawn						
Key: P Participant A Absent N Not invited I Invited W Withdrawn					Bill de Blasio	Joe Lhota
1	Oct. 22, 2013	1010 WINS; Common Cause New York; El Diario La Prensa; New York City Campaign Finance Board; WCBS & WCBS Newsradio 880	Maurice Dubois	YouTube	P	P
2	Oct. 30, 2013	New York City Campaign Finance Board; Telemundo Nueva York; The Wall Street Journal, WNBC	David Ushery	YouTube	P	P

=== Results ===
2013 New York City mayoral election
Party	Candidate	Votes	%	±%
Democratic	Bill de Blasio	753,039	69.23%	+25.3%
Working Families	Bill de Blasio	42,640	3.92%	+1.5%
Total	Bill de Blasio	795,679	73.15%	+26.9%
Republican	Joe Lhota	236,212	21.72%	−16.0%
Conservative	Joe Lhota	24,888	2.29%	+0.7%
Taxes 2 High	Joe Lhota	2,500	0.23%	N/A
Students First	Joe Lhota	820	0.08%	N/A
Total	Joe Lhota	264,420	24.31%	−26.4%
Independence	Adolfo Carrion	8,675	0.80%	−12.2%
Green	Anthony Gronowicz	4,983	0.46%	−0.3%
Jobs & Education	Jack Hidary	2,922	0.27%	N/A
Common Sense	Jack Hidary	718	0.07%	N/A
Total	Jack Hidary	3,640	0.33%	N/A
Rent Is Too Damn High	Jimmy McMillan	1,990	0.18%	0.0%
School Choice	Erick Salgado	1,946	0.18%	N/A
Libertarian	Michael Sanchez	1,746	0.16%	+0.1%
Socialist Workers	Dan Fein	758	0.07%	0.0%
Tax Wall Street	Randy Credico	690	0.06%	N/A
Freedom Party	Michael K. Greys	575	0.05%	N/A
Reform	Carl Person	306	0.03%	N/A
Affordable Tomorrow	Joseph Melaragno	289	0.03%	N/A
War Veterans	Sam Sloan	166	0.02%	
Flourish Every Person	Michael J. Dilger	55	0.01%	N/A
Write-in		1,792	0.16%	N/A
Total votes		1,087,710	100.00%	N/A
Democratic gain from Independent		Swing	53.2%	

=== Results by borough ===
General election
		Manhattan	The Bronx	Brooklyn	Queens	Staten Island	Total
Democratic-Working Families	Bill de Blasio	195,317 (71.69%)	121,511 (86.08%)	263,823 (77.52%)	181,921 (70.28%)	33,107 (44.20%)	795,679 (73.15%)
Republican-Conservative-etc	Joe Lhota	69,434 (25.48%)	15,559 (11.02%)	68,543 (20.14%)	71,306 (27.55%)	39,538 (52.79%)	264,420 (24.31%)
Independence	Adolfo Carrión Jr.	2,161 (0.79%)	2,595 (1.84%)	1,463 (0.43%)	1,754 (0.68%)	702 (0.94%)	8,675 (0.80%)
Green	Anthony Gronowicz	1,655 (0.61%)	324 (0.23%)	1,507 (0.44%)	1,177 (0.45%)	320 (0.43%)	4,983 (0.46%)
Jobs & Education-Common Sense	Jack Hidary	1,081 (0.40%)	151 (0.11%)	1,630 (0.48%)	541 (0.21%)	237 (0.32%)	3,640 (0.33%)
Rent Is Too Damn High	Jimmy McMillan	579 (0.21%)	154 (0.11%)	608 (0.18%)	480 (0.19%)	169 (0.23%)	1,990 (0.18%)
School Choice	Erick Salgado	267 (0.10%)	342 (0.24%)	932 (0.27%)	324 (0.13%)	81 (0.11%)	1,946 (0.18%)
Libertarian	Michael Sanchez	446 (0.16%)	128 (0.09%)	485 (0.14%)	449 (0.17%)	238 (0.32%)	1,746 (0.16%)
Socialist Workers	Daniel B. Fein	230 (0.08%)	59 (0.04%)	253 (0.07%)	177 (0.07%)	39 (0.05%)	758 (0.07%)
Tax Wall Street	Randy Credico	317 (0.12%)	47 (0.03%)	155 (0.05%)	128 (0.05%)	43 (0.06%)	690 (0.06%)
Freedom Party	Michael K. Greys	161 (0.06%)	65 (0.05%)	241 (0.07%)	89 (0.03%)	19 (0.03%)	575 (0.05%)
Reform Party	Carl E. Person	86 (0.03%)	20 (0.01%)	85 (0.02%)	83 (0.03%)	32 (0.04%)	306 (0.03%)
Affordable Tomorrow	Joseph Melaragno	55 (0.02%)	26 (0.02%)	92 (0.03%)	85 (0.03%)	31 (0.04%)	289 (0.03%)
War Veterans	Sam Sloan	19 (0.01%)	23 (0.02%)	44 (0.01%)	43 (0.02%)	37 (0.05%)	166 (0.02%)
Flourish Every Person	Michael J. Dilger	12 (0.00%)	4 (0.00%)	29 (0.01%)	4 (0.00%)	6 (0.01%)	55 (0.01%)
N/A	Write-ins	639 (0.23%)	149 (0.11%)	440 (0.13%)	304 (0.12%)	300 (0.40%)	1,792 (0.16%)
	Total	272,459 (25.05%)	141,157 (12.98%)	340,330 (31.29%)	258,865 (23.80%)	74,899 (6.89%)	1,087,710 (100.00%)

== See also ==
- New York City mayoral elections
- 2009 New York City mayoral election
- 2013 New York City Comptroller election
