= List of automatic delegates at the 2020 Democratic National Convention =

This list tracks the presumed support (based on endorsements) for given United States presidential candidates among the 775 unpledged delegates (commonly known as superdelegates, and referred to in the 2020 election cycle as "automatic delegates") who were eligible to cast a vote at the 2020 Democratic National Convention, in Milwaukee, Wisconsin. The convention was postponed to August 17–20, 2020, due to the ongoing coronavirus pandemic in the United States. The 8 unpledged delegates from Democrats Abroad carried half-votes at the convention, yielding a forecast total of 771 votes. Unpledged delegates represented about 16% of the overall convention votes (4,754 delegates, 4,750 votes), though reforms severely restricted their ability to vote on a first ballot, and came from several categories of prominent Democratic Party members: (Note: At least nine delegates and as many as 14 delegates are in at least two of these categories.)

- 26 distinguished party leaders (DPL), consisting of former Democratic presidents and vice-presidents, former Democratic house speakers and minority leaders, former Democratic senate leaders, and former DNC chairs
- 236 Democratic members of the United States House of Representatives (including non-voting delegates from Washington, D.C., and territories)
- 48 Democratic members of the United States Senate (including D.C. shadow senators) and Bernie Sanders, an Independent who caucuses with the Democratic Party
- 28 Democratic governors (including territorial governors and the Mayor of the District of Columbia).
- 439 other elected members (with 435 votes) from the Democratic National Committee (including the chair of the DNC, as well as the chairs and vice-chairs of each state's Democratic Party)

Automatic delegates are "unpledged" in the sense that they themselves decide which candidate to support. (In other words, they are not allocated according to voter preferences as the majority of delegates are.) Pledged delegates can change their vote if no candidate is elected on the first ballot and can even vote for a different candidate on the first ballot if they are "released" by the candidate they are pledged to. Automatic delegates, on the other hand, can change their vote purely of their own volition. With the exception of the eight DNC members from the Democrats Abroad, who each receive a half-vote, all automatic delegates are entitled to one vote (including when a sitting official or distinguished party leader is also a DNC member). Throughout this list, those who qualify under multiple categories are considered as DPLs first, then as sitting officials, and then as DNC members (for example, a sitting senator who is also a DNC member is listed as a senator).

The list below is based on the most recent information on how unpledged delegates have endorsed candidates in the 2020 Democratic Party presidential primaries. Data is sourced from FiveThirtyEight's endorsement tracker where more recent data is not available.

== Totals by group ==
Candidate	DPL	Governors	Senators	Representatives	DNC members	Totals
Joe Biden	12	23	42	182	27	286
Bernie Sanders *	0	0	0	2	17	19
Elizabeth Warren *	0	0	0	3	9	12
Amy Klobuchar *	1	0	0	3	1	5
Pete Buttigieg *	1	0	0	0	4	5
Michael Bloomberg *	0	0	0	0	5	5
Endorsed a candidate who withdrew before March 2020	0	0	0	9	11	20
No endorsement	12	5	5	34	361	417
Totals	26	28	47 (48 total; 1 DPL excluded)	234 (235 total; 1 DPL excluded)	435 (447 total; 3 Governors, 2 Representatives, 2 Senators and 5 others excluded)	771

* = candidates who withdrew or suspended their campaigns

Note: Democrats Abroad automatic delegates are assigned half-votes; each of them accounts for 1/2 rather than 1 in the table above.

== List ==
Delegate	State	Position	Endorsement	Date	Ref.
Andrew Cuomo	(New York (state)) New York	governor	Biden	January 2, 2019	
Dianne Feinstein	California	senator	Biden	January 3, 2019	
Tom Carper	Delaware	senator	Biden	January 8, 2019	
Laphonza Butler	California	DNC member	Harris	January 21, 2019	
James Zogby	(Washington, D.C.) District of Columbia	DNC member	Sanders	January 25, 2019	
Ted Lieu	California	representative	Biden (Note: Previously endorsed Kamala Harris.)	April 16, 2019	
Nanette Barragán	California	representative	Harris	January 29, 2019	
Bob Menendez	New Jersey	senator	Booker	February 1, 2019	
Clay N. Middleton	South Carolina	DNC member	Booker	February 4, 2019	
Walter Mondale	Minnesota	distinguished party leader (former Vice President)	Klobuchar	February 6, 2019	
Jim McGovern	Massachusetts	representative	Biden (Note: Previously endorsed Elizabeth Warren.)	April 20, 2020	
Ed Markey	Massachusetts	senator	Biden	April 16, 2020	
Joe Kennedy III	Massachusetts	representative	Warren	February 9, 2019	
Lori Trahan	Massachusetts	representative	Warren	February 9, 2019	
Angie Craig	Minnesota	representative	Biden (Note: Previously endorsed Amy Klobuchar.)	April 17, 2019	
Dean Phillips	Minnesota	representative	Klobuchar	February 10, 2019	
Tim Walz	Minnesota	governor	Biden	August 12, 2020	
Barbara Lee	California	representative	Biden	February 14, 2019	
Patrick Leahy	Vermont	senator	Biden (Note: Previously endorsed Bernie Sanders.)	July 28, 2020	
Peter Welch	Vermont	representative	Biden	July 28, 2020	
Larry Cohen	(Washington, D.C.) District of Columbia	DNC member	Sanders	February 20, 2019	
Emmy Ruiz	Texas	DNC member	Harris	February 20, 2019	
Ro Khanna	California	representative	Biden	April 20, 2020	
Frank Pallone Jr.	New Jersey	representative	Booker	February 21, 2019	
Marguerite M. Schaffer	New Jersey	DNC member	Booker	February 21, 2019	
Albio Sires	New Jersey	representative	Booker	February 21, 2019	
Nina Turner	Ohio	DNC member	Sanders	February 21, 2019	
Chris Coons	Delaware	senator	Biden	February 26, 2019	
Julia Brownley	California	representative	Biden	April 16, 2019	
Rick Larsen	(Washington (state)) Washington	representative	Inslee	March 1, 2019	
Karl Racine	(Washington, D.C.) District of Columbia	DNC member	Harris	March 7, 2019	
Carolyn Maloney	(New York (state)) New York	representative	Gillibrand	March 17, 2019	
Susie A. Shannon	California	DNC member	Sanders	March 25, 2019	
Eric Swalwell	California	representative	Biden (Note: Previously a candidate.)	April 29, 2020	
Steven Grossman	Massachusetts	distinguished party leader (former DNC chair)	Buttigieg	April 11, 2019	
John Graham	New Jersey	DNC member	Booker	April 12, 2019	
Bernadette P. McPherson	New Jersey	DNC member	Booker	April 12, 2019	
Nan Whaley	Ohio	DNC member	Buttigieg	April 14, 2019	
Michelle Deatrick	Michigan	DNC member	Sanders	April 18, 2019	
Kate Donaghue	Massachusetts	DNC member	Warren	April 19, 2019	
Stephen F. Lynch	Massachusetts	representative	Biden	April 22, 2019	
Ed Rendell	Pennsylvania	distinguished party leader (former DNC chair)	Biden	April 22, 2019	
Matt Cartwright	Pennsylvania	representative	Biden	April 24, 2019	
Cristóbal J. Alex	Texas	DNC member	Biden	April 25, 2019	
Joe Biden	Delaware	distinguished party leader (former Vice President)	Biden	April 25, 2019	
Lisa Blunt Rochester	Delaware	representative	Biden	April 25, 2019	
Brendan Boyle	Pennsylvania	representative	Biden	April 25, 2019	
John Carney	Delaware	governor	Biden	April 25, 2019	
Bob Casey Jr.	Pennsylvania	senator	Biden	April 25, 2019	
Dwight Evans	Pennsylvania	representative	Biden	April 25, 2019	
Doug Jones	Alabama	senator	Biden	April 25, 2019	
Cedric Richmond	Louisiana	representative	Biden	April 25, 2019	
Symone Sanders	(Washington, D.C.) District of Columbia	DNC member	Biden	April 25, 2019	
Thomas Suozzi	(New York (state)) New York	representative	Biden	April 25, 2019	
Michael Bennet	Colorado	senator	Biden (Note: Previously endorsed Michael Bennet.)	April 8, 2020	
A. Donald McEachin	Virginia	representative	Biden	May 3, 2019	
Steve Bullock	Montana	governor	Bullock	May 14, 2019	
Filemon Vela Jr.	Texas	representative	Biden	May 14, 2019	
Tom Daschle	South Dakota	distinguished party leader (former Senate leader)	Biden	May 20, 2019	
Kim Schrier	(Washington (state)) Washington	representative	Inslee	May 23, 2019	
Al Lawson	Florida	representative	Biden	May 30, 2019	
Jon Tester	Montana	senator	Biden (Note: Previously endorsed Steve Bullock.)	May 15, 2020	
Al Green	Texas	representative	Harris	June 20, 2019	
Derek Kilmer	(Washington (state)) Washington	representative	Inslee	June 20, 2019	
Lacy Clay	Missouri	representative	Harris	June 25, 2019	
Jan M. Bauer	Iowa	DNC member	Bullock	June 26, 2019	
Barry J. Goodman	Michigan	DNC member	Biden	June 28, 2019	
Ned Lamont	Connecticut	governor	Biden	July 2, 2019	
Jahana Hayes	Connecticut	representative	Harris	July 3, 2019	
Eddie Bernice Johnson	Texas	representative	Biden	July 22, 2019	
Leopoldo J. Martinez	Virginia	DNC member	Biden	July 22, 2019	
Mary Sullivan	Vermont	DNC member	Sanders	July 23, 2019	
William Owen	Tennessee	DNC member	Biden	July 29, 2019	
Katherine Clark	Massachusetts	representative	Warren	July 30, 2019	
Raúl Grijalva	Arizona	representative	Warren	July 30, 2019	
Deb Haaland	New Mexico	representative	Biden	April 9, 2020	
Andy Levin	Michigan	representative	Biden	April 20, 2020	
J. Luis Correa	California	representative	Biden	August 22, 2019	
Curtis Wylde	Missouri	DNC member	Sanders	August 31, 2019	
Troy Jackson	Maine	DNC member	Sanders	September 1, 2019	
Jamie Raskin	Maryland	representative	Biden	April 20, 2020	
Kweisi Mfume	Maryland	representative			
Nikki Ford Barnes	Florida	DNC member	Booker	September 12, 2019	
Vicente Gonzalez	Texas	representative	Biden (Note: Previously endorsed Julián Castro.)	September 15, 2019	
G. K. Butterfield	North Carolina	representative	Biden	September 19, 2019	
Emanuel Cleaver	Missouri	representative	Biden	September 19, 2019	
Charlie Crist	Florida	representative	Biden	September 19, 2019	
Alex Goff	Nevada	DNC member	Warren	October 10, 2019	
Betty McCollum	Minnesota	representative	Klobuchar	October 10, 2019	
Ilhan Omar	Minnesota	representative	Biden	July 20, 2020	
Chris Dodd	Connecticut	distinguished party leader (former DNC chair)	Biden	October 18, 2019	
Alexandria Ocasio-Cortez	(New York (state)) New York	representative	Biden	April 15, 2020	
Terry L. Tucker	Colorado	DNC member	Sanders	October 22, 2019	
Jeri D. Shepherd	Colorado	DNC member	Sanders	October 22, 2019	
Katie Porter	California	representative	Biden	April 8, 2020	
Rashida Tlaib	Michigan	representative	Sanders	October 27, 2019	
Ayanna Pressley	Massachusetts	representative	Warren	November 6, 2019	
Marc Veasey	Texas	representative	Biden	November 7, 2019	
Tim Ryan	Ohio	representative	Biden	November 13, 2019	
Kurt Schrader	Oregon	representative	Biden	November 16, 2019	
Ted Terry	(Georgia (U.S. state)) Georgia	DNC member	Sanders	November 21, 2019	
Salud Carbajal	California	representative	Harris (Note: Previously endorsed Beto O'Rourke.)	November 22, 2019	
Dina Titus	Nevada	representative	Biden	November 25, 2019	
Peter Visclosky	Indiana	representative	Biden (Note: Previously endorsed Pete Buttigieg.)	April 17, 2020	
Kerman Maddox	California	DNC member	Biden	November 26, 2019	
John Garamendi	California	representative	Biden	November 30, 2019	
Jan Schakowsky	Illinois	representative	Warren	November 30, 2019	
Ami Bera	California	representative	Biden	December 3, 2019	
María Meléndez	Puerto Rico	DNC member	Biden	December 5, 2019	
Denise Merrill	Connecticut	DNC member	Warren	December 9, 2019	
Bob Mulholland	California	DNC member	Biden	December 11, 2019	
Lucille Roybal-Allard	California	representative	Biden	December 13, 2019	
Carla Brailey	Texas	DNC member	Bloomberg	December 20, 2019	
Tony Cárdenas	California	representative	Biden	December 23, 2019	
Keith Harper	(Washington, D.C.) District of Columbia	DNC member	Buttigieg	December 23, 2019	
Mark LaChey	Michigan	DNC member	Buttigieg	January 1, 2020	
Abby Finkenauer	Iowa	representative	Biden	January 3, 2020	
Jeff Berman	(Washington, D.C.) District of Columbia	DNC member	Steyer	January 3, 2020	
Chrissy Houlahan	Pennsylvania	representative	Biden	January 5, 2020	
Conor Lamb	Pennsylvania	representative	Biden	January 5, 2020	
Elaine Luria	Virginia	representative	Biden	January 5, 2020	
Henry R. Muñoz III	Texas	DNC member	Biden	January 5, 2020	
Megan E. Green	Missouri	DNC member	Sanders	January 8, 2020	
Martha Fuller Clark	New Hampshire	DNC member	Biden	January 9, 2020	
Eric Garcetti	California	DNC member	Biden	January 9, 2020	
Allison A. Stephens	Nevada	DNC member	Warren	January 9, 2020	
Kerri Evelyn Harris	Delaware	DNC member	Sanders	January 10, 2020	
Alexandra Gallardo Rooker	California	DNC member	Bloomberg	January 10, 2020	
Colin Allred	Texas	representative	Biden	January 13, 2020	
Sean Patrick Maloney	(New York (state)) New York	representative	Biden	January 13, 2020	
Michael Hancock	Colorado	DNC member	Biden (Note: Previously endorsed John Hickenlooper, then Michael Bennet.)	March 2, 2020	
Joaquin Castro	Texas	representative	Warren	January 14, 2020	
Tom Malinowski	New Jersey	representative	Biden (Note: Previously endorsed Cory Booker.)	January 14, 2020	
Mark Pocan	Wisconsin	representative	Biden	April 20, 2020	
Terri Sewell	Alabama	representative	Biden	January 17, 2020	
Pramila Jayapal	(Washington (state)) Washington	representative	Biden	April 27, 2020	
Sanford Bishop	(Georgia (U.S. state)) Georgia	representative	Biden	January 21, 2020	
Alcee Hastings	Florida	representative	Biden	January 21, 2020	
Sandy Opstvedt	Iowa	DNC member	Biden	January 21, 2020	
Donald Payne Jr.	New Jersey	representative	Biden	January 21, 2020	
José R. Rodríguez	Texas	DNC member	Warren (Note: Previously endorsed Beto O'Rourke, then Julián Castro after O'Rourke withdrew from the race.)	January 21, 2020	
Kathy Sullivan	New Hampshire	DNC member	Warren	January 21, 2020	
Frederica Wilson	Florida	representative	Biden	January 21, 2020	
Khary Penebaker	Wisconsin	DNC member	Bloomberg	January 23, 2020	
William H. Shaheen	New Hampshire	DNC member	Biden	January 23, 2020	
Cindy Axne	Iowa	representative	Biden	January 25, 2020	
Mark Smith	Iowa	DNC member	Biden	January 26, 2020	
Seth Moulton	Massachusetts	representative	Biden	January 27, 2020	
Alma Adams	North Carolina	representative	Biden	January 28, 2020	
Brad Schneider	Illinois	representative	Biden	January 29, 2020	
Ben McAdams	Utah	representative	Bloomberg	January 31, 2020	
Ruth Anna Buffalo	North Dakota	DNC member	Sanders	January 31, 2020 (Note: Elected to the DNC on March 21, 2020, subsequent to her endorsement of Sanders.)	
Paul G. Kirk	Massachusetts	distinguished party leader (former DNC chair)	Biden	January 31, 2020	
Sierra Yamanaka	Arizona	DNC member	Bloomberg	January 31, 2020	
Linda Sánchez	California	representative	Klobuchar	February 1, 2020	
Danny K. Davis	Illinois	representative	Biden	February 2, 2020	
Will Colom	Mississippi	DNC member	Bloomberg	February 4, 2020	
Alex Padilla	California	DNC member	Biden	February 4, 2020	
Grace Diaz	Rhode Island	DNC member	Biden	February 6, 2020	
Jared Golden	Maine	representative	Bennet	February 6, 2020	
Gilda Cobb-Hunter	South Carolina	DNC member	Steyer	February 12, 2020	
Jenny Wilson	Utah	DNC member	Buttigieg	February 14, 2020	
Steven Horsford	Nevada	representative	Biden	February 14, 2020	
Celina Vasquez	Texas	DNC member	Warren	February 17, 2020	
Sylvia Garcia	Texas	representative	Biden	February 19, 2020	
Jesús "Chuy" García	Illinois	representative	Biden	April 9, 2020	
David Price	North Carolina	representative	Biden	February 25, 2020	
Jim Clyburn	South Carolina	representative	Biden	February 26, 2020	
Maria Echaveste	California	DNC member	Klobuchar	February 26, 2020	
Iris Y. Martinez	Illinois	DNC member	Biden	February 26, 2020	
Tim Kaine	Virginia	distinguished party leader (former DNC chair) (Note: Is also a senator.)	Biden	February 28, 2020	
Richard E. Neal	Massachusetts	representative	Warren	February 28, 2020	
Marc Broklawski	Virginia	DNC member	Biden	February 28, 2020	
Terry McAuliffe	Virginia	distinguished party leader (former DNC chair)	Biden	February 29, 2020	
Randi Weingarten	(New York (state)) New York	DNC member	Warren	February 29, 2020	
Robert C. Scott	Virginia	representative	Biden	February 29, 2020	
Don Beyer	Virginia	representative	Biden	March 1, 2020	
Ray McKinnon	North Carolina	DNC member	Sanders	March 1, 2020	
Greg Stanton	Arizona	representative	Biden	March 1, 2020	
Debbie Wasserman Schultz	Florida	distinguished party leader (former DNC chair) (Note: Is also a representative.)	Biden	March 1, 2020	
Jennifer Wexton	Virginia	representative	Biden	March 1, 2020	
Gil Cisneros	California	representative	Biden	March 2, 2020	
Steven C. Cochran	Virginia	DNC member	Biden	March 2, 2020	
Tammy Duckworth	Illinois	senator	Biden	March 2, 2020	
Veronica Escobar	Texas	representative	Biden	March 2, 2020	
Marcia Fudge	Ohio	representative	Biden	March 2, 2020	
Amy Klobuchar	Minnesota	senator	Biden	March 2, 2020	
Mark Mallory	Ohio	DNC member	Biden	March 2, 2020	
Jerry McNerney	California	representative	Biden	March 2, 2020	
Harry Reid	Nevada	distinguished party leader (former Senate leader)	Biden	March 2, 2020	
Roy Romer	Colorado	distinguished party leader (former DNC chair)	Biden	March 2, 2020	
Yasmine Taeb	Virginia	DNC member	Sanders	March 2, 2020	
Jim Costa	California	representative	Biden	March 3, 2020	
Joshua Harris-Till	Oklahoma	DNC member	Warren	March 3, 2020	
Collin Peterson	Minnesota	representative	Biden	March 3, 2020	
Bennie G. Thompson	Mississippi	representative	Biden	March 3, 2020	
Abigail Spanberger	Virginia	representative	Biden	March 3, 2020	
Kathy Castor	Florida	representative	Biden	March 4, 2020	
Bill Foster	Illinois	representative	Biden	March 4, 2020	
Lois Frankel	Florida	representative	Biden	March 4, 2020	
Robin Kelly	Illinois	representative	Biden	March 4, 2020	
Andy Kim	New Jersey	representative	Biden (Note: Previously endorsed Cory Booker, then Pete Buttigieg after Booker withdrew from the race.)	March 4, 2020	
Mike Quigley	Illinois	representative	Biden	March 4, 2020	
Gina Raimondo	Rhode Island	governor	Biden (Note: Previously endorsed Michael Bloomberg.)	March 4, 2020	
Kyrsten Sinema	Arizona	senator	Biden	March 4, 2020	
Kathleen Rice	(New York (state)) New York	representative	Biden (Note: Previously endorsed Beto O'Rourke, then Pete Buttigieg after O'Rourke withdrew from the race.)	March 4, 2020	
Ted Deutch	Florida	representative	Biden	March 4, 2020	
Gretchen Whitmer	Michigan	governor	Biden	March 5, 2020	
Elissa Slotkin	Michigan	representative	Biden	March 5, 2020	
Ann Kuster	New Hampshire	representative	Biden	March 5, 2020	
David Trone	Maryland	representative	Biden (Note: Previously endorsed John Delaney.)	March 5, 2020	
Anthony Brown	Maryland	representative	Biden	March 5, 2020	
Dutch Ruppersberger	Maryland	representative	Biden	March 5, 2020	
Val Demings	Florida	representative	Biden	March 5, 2020	
Madeleine Dean	Pennsylvania	representative	Biden	March 5, 2020	
Sean Casten	Illinois	representative	Biden	March 5, 2020	
Susan Davis	California	representative	Biden	March 5, 2020	
Haley Stevens	Michigan	representative	Biden	March 5, 2020	
Brenda Lawrence	Michigan	representative	Biden	March 5, 2020	
Harley Rouda	California	representative	Biden	March 6, 2020	
Maggie Hassan	New Hampshire	senator	Biden	March 6, 2020	
Darren Soto	Florida	representative	Biden	March 6, 2020	
Ruben Gallego	Arizona	representative	Biden (Note: Previously endorsed Eric Swalwell, then Kamala Harris after Swalwell withdrew from the race.)	March 6, 2020	
Dick Durbin	Illinois	senator	Biden	March 6, 2020	
Stephanie Murphy	Florida	representative	Biden (Note: Previously endorsed Beto O'Rourke, then Michael Bloomberg after O'Rourke withdrew from the race.)	March 6, 2020	
Joshua Boschee	North Dakota	DNC member	Biden	March 6, 2020	
Sheila Jackson Lee	Texas	representative	Biden	March 7, 2020	
Kamala Harris	California	senator	Biden	March 8, 2020	
Tina Smith	Minnesota	senator	Biden	March 8, 2020	
Cory Booker	New Jersey	senator	Biden	March 9, 2020	
Hank Johnson	(Georgia (U.S. state)) Georgia	representative	Biden	March 9, 2020	
Gregory Meeks	(New York (state)) New York	representative	Biden	March 9, 2020	
Debbie Mucarsel-Powell	Florida	representative	Biden	March 9, 2020	
Bonnie Watson Coleman	New Jersey	representative	Biden	March 9, 2020	
Muriel Bowser	(Washington, D.C.) District of Columbia	governor (Note: Mayor of DC included as an automatic delegate along with governors.)	Biden	March 10, 2020	
Eleanor Holmes Norton	(Washington, D.C.) District of Columbia	representative (delegate)	Biden	March 10, 2020	
Marcy Kaptur	Ohio	representative	Biden	March 10, 2020	
Bobby L. Rush	Illinois	representative	Biden (Note: Previously endorsed Kamala Harris, then Michael Bloomberg after Harris withdrew from the race.)	March 10, 2020	
Mark Takano	California	representative	Sanders	March 10, 2020	
Pete Aguilar	California	representative	Biden	March 11, 2020	
Mary Gay Scanlon	Pennsylvania	representative	Biden	March 11, 2020	
Josh Gottheimer	New Jersey	representative	Biden (Note: Previously endorsed Cory Booker, then Michael Bloomberg after Booker withdrew from the race.)	March 11, 2020	
Raja Krishnamoorthi	Illinois	representative	Biden	March 11, 2020	
Nita Lowey	(New York (state)) New York	representative	Biden	March 11, 2020	
Lucy McBath	(Georgia (U.S. state)) Georgia	representative	Biden	March 11, 2020	
Donald Norcross	New Jersey	representative	Biden	March 11, 2019	
Bill Pascrell	New Jersey	representative	Biden	March 11, 2019	
Scott Peters	California	representative	Biden	March 11, 2020	
Stacey Plaskett	(United States Virgin Islands) U.S. Virgin Islands	representative (delegate)	Biden	March 11, 2020	
Max Rose	(New York (state)) New York	representative	Biden	March 11, 2020	
Mikie Sherrill	New Jersey	representative	Biden	March 11, 2020	
Pam Stephenson	(Georgia (U.S. state)) Georgia	DNC member	Biden	March 11, 2020	
Juan Vargas	California	representative	Biden (Note: Previously endorsed John Delaney, then Michael Bloomberg after Delaney withdrew from the race.)	March 11, 2020	
John Currie	New Jersey	DNC member	Biden	March 11, 2020	
Dave Loebsack	Iowa	representative	Biden	March 12, 2020	
Gregorio Sablan	(Northern Mariana Islands) Northern Marianas	representative (delegate)	Biden	March 12, 2020	
Ann Kirkpatrick	Arizona	representative	Biden	March 12, 2020	
Jackie Speier	California	representative	Biden	March 13, 2020	
Karen Bass	California	representative	Biden	March 13, 2020	
Adriano Espaillat	(New York (state)) New York	representative	Biden	March 15, 2020	
Donna Shalala	Florida	representative	Biden	March 15, 2020	
J. B. Pritzker	Illinois	governor	Biden	March 16, 2020	
Marian B. Tasco	Pennsylvania	DNC member	Biden	March 16, 2020	
Michael A. Nutter	Pennsylvania	DNC member	Biden (Note: Previously endorsed Michael Bloomberg, and subsequently Joe Biden a week before the latter launched his campaign and then, subsequently, Michael Bloomberg once again.)	March 16, 2020	
Carol Ronen	Illinois	DNC member	Biden	March 16, 2020	
Raul Ruiz	California	representative	Biden	March 17, 2020	
Brad Sherman	California	representative	Biden	March 17, 2020	
Gary Winston Apple	Missouri	DNC member	Sanders	March 18, 2020	
Gerald E. Connolly	Virginia	representative	Biden	March 18, 2020	
Tulsi Gabbard	Hawaii	representative	Biden	March 19, 2020	
Jim Himes	Connecticut	representative	Biden	March 19, 2020	
Kirsten Gillibrand	(New York (state)) New York	senator	Biden	March 19, 2020	
Jared Huffman	California	representative	Biden	April 1, 2020	
Ron Kind	Wisconsin	representative	Biden	April 3, 2020	
Sherrod Brown	Ohio	senator	Biden	April 7, 2020	
Susan Wild	Pennsylvania	representative	Biden	April 8, 2020	
Kate Brown	Oregon	governor	Biden	April 8, 2020	
Bernie Sanders	Vermont	senator	Biden	April 13, 2020	
Barack Obama	Illinois	distinguished party leader (former President)	Biden	April 14, 2020	
Elizabeth Warren	Massachusetts	senator	Biden	April 15, 2020	
Jay Inslee	(Washington (state)) Washington	governor	Biden	April 22, 2020	
Al Gore	Tennessee	distinguished party leader (former Vice President)	Biden	April 22, 2020	
Nancy Pelosi	California	representative (House Speaker)	Biden	April 27, 2020	
Gavin Newsom	California	governor	Biden	May 8, 2020	
Phil Murphy	New Jersey	governor	Biden	May 14, 2020	
Michelle Lujan Grisham	New Mexico	governor	Biden	May 22, 2020	
Jimmy Carter	(Georgia (U.S. state)) Georgia	distinguished party leader (former President)			
Bill Clinton	(New York (state)) New York	distinguished party leader (former President)			
George J. Mitchell	(New York (state)) New York	distinguished party leader (former Senate leader)			
Dick Gephardt	Missouri	distinguished party leader (former House leader)			
Joe Andrew	Maryland	distinguished party leader (former DNC chair)			
Donna Brazile	(Washington, D.C.) District of Columbia	distinguished party leader (former DNC chair)			
Kenneth M. Curtis	Maine	distinguished party leader (former DNC chair)			
Howard Dean	Vermont	distinguished party leader (former DNC chair)			
Debra DeLee	Massachusetts	distinguished party leader (former DNC chair)			
Donald Fowler	South Carolina	distinguished party leader (former DNC chair)			
Fred R. Harris	New Mexico	distinguished party leader (former DNC chair)			
David Wilhelm	Ohio	distinguished party leader (former DNC chair)			
Tom O'Halleran	Arizona	representative			
Mike Thompson	California	representative	Biden	August 11, 2020	
Doris Matsui	California	representative	Biden	May 5, 2020	
Josh Harder	California	representative	Biden	April 25, 2020	
Mark DeSaulnier	California	representative			
Anna Eshoo	California	representative			
Zoe Lofgren	California	representative			
Jimmy Panetta	California	representative			
TJ Cox	California	representative			
Judy Chu	California	representative	Biden	May 20, 2020	
Adam Schiff	California	representative	Biden	April 15, 2020	
Grace Napolitano	California	representative			
Jimmy Gomez	California	representative			
Norma Torres	California	representative			
Maxine Waters	California	representative	Biden	June 2, 2020	
Alan Lowenthal	California	representative			
Mike Levin	California	representative	Biden	April 16, 2020	
Diana DeGette	Colorado	representative	Biden	May 3, 2020	
Joe Neguse	Colorado	representative			
Jason Crow	Colorado	representative	Biden	April 8, 2020	
Ed Perlmutter	Colorado	representative	Biden	April 14, 2020	
John B. Larson	Connecticut	representative	Biden	May 27, 2020	
Joe Courtney	Connecticut	representative	Biden	May 27, 2020	
Rosa DeLauro	Connecticut	representative	Biden	May 27, 2020	
David Scott	(Georgia (U.S. state)) Georgia	representative			
Michael San Nicolas	Guam	representative (delegate)			
Ed Case	Hawaii	representative	Biden	April 17, 2020	
Daniel Lipinski	Illinois	representative	Biden	March 13, 2020	
Lauren Underwood	Illinois	representative			
Cheri Bustos	Illinois	representative	Biden	April 20, 2020	
André Carson	Indiana	representative	Biden	July 20, 2020	
Sharice Davids	Kansas	representative	Biden	April 14, 2020	
John Yarmuth	Kentucky	representative	Biden	April 15, 2020	
Chellie Pingree	Maine	representative			
Steny Hoyer	Maryland	representative	Biden	May 31, 2020	
John Sarbanes	Maryland	representative	Biden	May 26, 2020	
Bill Keating	Massachusetts	representative			
Dan Kildee	Michigan	representative			
Debbie Dingell	Michigan	representative	Biden	June 15, 2020	
Susie Lee	Nevada	representative	Biden	May 28, 2020	
Chris Pappas	New Hampshire	representative	Biden	May 9, 2020	
Xochitl Torres Small	New Mexico	representative			
Ben Ray Luján	New Mexico	representative	Biden	May 28, 2020	
Grace Meng	(New York (state)) New York	representative			
Nydia Velázquez	(New York (state)) New York	representative			
Hakeem Jeffries	(New York (state)) New York	representative			
Yvette Clarke	(New York (state)) New York	representative			
Jerrold Nadler	(New York (state)) New York	representative			
Eliot Engel	(New York (state)) New York	representative	Biden	April 28, 2020	
Antonio Delgado	(New York (state)) New York	representative			
José E. Serrano	(New York (state)) New York	representative			
Paul Tonko	(New York (state)) New York	representative			
Anthony Brindisi	(New York (state)) New York	representative	Biden	April 15, 2020	
Joseph D. Morelle	(New York (state)) New York	representative			
Brian Higgins	(New York (state)) New York	representative			
Joyce Beatty	Ohio	representative	Biden	April 28, 2020	
Kendra Horn	Oklahoma	representative			
Suzanne Bonamici	Oregon	representative			
Earl Blumenauer	Oregon	representative			
Peter DeFazio	Oregon	representative			
Mike Doyle	Pennsylvania	representative			
David Cicilline	Rhode Island	representative	Biden	May 19, 2020	
Jim Langevin	Rhode Island	representative	Biden	May 19, 2020	
Joe Cunningham	South Carolina	representative			
Jim Cooper	Tennessee	representative			
Steve Cohen	Tennessee	representative			
Lizzie Fletcher	Texas	representative	Biden	April 24, 2020	
Henry Cuellar	Texas	representative	Biden	April 17, 2020	
Lloyd Doggett	Texas	representative			
Suzan DelBene	(Washington (state)) Washington	representative			
Adam Smith	(Washington (state)) Washington	representative			
Denny Heck	(Washington (state)) Washington	representative			
Gwen Moore	Wisconsin	representative	Biden	April 22, 2020	
Chuck Schumer	(New York (state)) New York	senator (Senate leader)	Biden	August 16, 2020	
Richard Blumenthal	Connecticut	senator	Biden	May 20, 2020	
Chris Murphy	Connecticut	senator	Biden	April 15, 2020	
Michael Donald Brown	(Washington, D.C.) District of Columbia	senator (Note: Shadow senator for DC.)			
Paul Strauss	(Washington, D.C.) District of Columbia	senator			
Mazie Hirono	Hawaii	senator	Biden	April 17, 2020	
Brian Schatz	Hawaii	senator	Biden	April 17, 2020	
Ben Cardin	Maryland	senator	Biden	May 21, 2020	
Chris Van Hollen	Maryland	senator	Biden	May 21, 2020	
Gary Peters	Michigan	senator	Biden	April 15, 2020	
Debbie Stabenow	Michigan	senator	Biden	April 15, 2020	
Catherine Cortez Masto	Nevada	senator	Biden	April 30, 2020	
Jacky Rosen	Nevada	senator	Biden	July 2, 2020	
Jeanne Shaheen	New Hampshire	senator	Biden	April 17, 2020	
Martin Heinrich	New Mexico	senator	Biden	April 14, 2020	
Tom Udall	New Mexico	senator	Biden	April 8, 2020	
Jeff Merkley	Oregon	senator			
Ron Wyden	Oregon	senator			
Jack Reed	Rhode Island	senator	Biden	May 19, 2020	
Sheldon Whitehouse	Rhode Island	senator	Biden	May 19, 2020	
Mark Warner	Virginia	senator	Biden	April 20, 2020	
Maria Cantwell	(Washington (state)) Washington	senator			
Patty Murray	(Washington (state)) Washington	senator	Biden	February 20, 2020	
Tammy Baldwin	Wisconsin	senator	Biden	April 15, 2020	
Joe Manchin	West Virginia	senator	Biden	April 16, 2020	
Lolo Matalasi Moliga	American Samoa	governor			
Jared Polis	Colorado	governor	Biden	June 5, 2020	
Lou Leon Guerrero	Guam	governor	Biden	August 12, 2020	
David Ige	Hawaii	governor			
Laura Kelly	Kansas	governor			
Andy Beshear	Kentucky	governor	Biden	August 20, 2020	
John Bel Edwards	Louisiana	governor			
Janet Mills	Maine	governor	Biden	August 18, 2020	
Steve Sisolak	Nevada	governor			
Roy Cooper	North Carolina	governor	Biden	July 3, 2020	
Tom Wolf	Pennsylvania	governor	Biden	May 27, 2020	
Ralph Northam	Virginia	governor			
Albert Bryan	(United States Virgin Islands) U.S. Virgin Islands	governor	Biden	August 21, 2020	
Tony Evers	Wisconsin	governor	Biden	August 3, 2020	
Tom Perez	Maryland	DNC Member (chair)			
Clinton M. Daughtrey	Alabama	DNC member			
Christopher J. England	Alabama	DNC member			
Unzell Kelley	Alabama	DNC member			
Janet May	Alabama	DNC member			
Charlie Lethate Staten	Alabama	DNC member			
Patricia Todd	Alabama	DNC member			
Chuck Degnan	Alaska	DNC member			
Sheila A. Selkregg	Alaska	DNC member			
Casey Steinau	Alaska	DNC member			
Edward Wesley	Alaska	DNC member			
Michael John Gray	Arkansas	DNC member			
Nicole Hart	Arkansas	DNC member			
Dustin McDaniel	Arkansas	DNC member			
Lottie Shackelford	Arkansas	DNC member			
Kasey Summerville	Arkansas	DNC member			
Marcus Langkilde	American Samoa	DNC member			
Petti Matila	American Samoa	DNC member			
Aliitama Soto'a	American Samoa	DNC member			
Minnie Tuia	American Samoa	DNC member			
Douglas Ballard	Arizona	DNC member			
William Patrick Burns	Arizona	DNC member			
Adrian Fontes	Arizona	DNC member			
Luis Alberto Heredia	Arizona	DNC member			
Ellie Perez	Arizona	DNC member			
Felecia Rotellini	Arizona	DNC member			
Steven K. Alari	California	DNC member			
William Derrough	California	DNC member			
Maria Elena Durazo	California	DNC member			
Becca Doten	California	DNC member			
Jesse L. Durfee	California	DNC member			
Mary Ellen Early	California	DNC member			
Ron Galperin	California	DNC member			
Rusty Hicks	California	DNC member			
Alice A. Huffman	California	DNC member			
Aleita J. Huguenin	California	DNC member			
Lorna M. Johnson	California	DNC member			
Michael Kapp	California	DNC member			
Sam Dobson	South Carolina	DNC member			
Andrew Lachman	California	DNC member			
Otto Lee	California	DNC member			
Sandra M. Lowe	California	DNC member			
Christine Pelosi	California	DNC member			
John Pérez	California	DNC member			
Melahat Rafiei	California	DNC member			
Rion J. Ramirez	California	DNC member			
Garry S. Shay	California	DNC member			
Keith Umemoto	California	DNC member			
Amy Elaine Wakeland	California	DNC member			
Rosalind Wyman	California	DNC member			
Laurence S. Zakson	California	DNC member			
Morgan Carroll	Colorado	DNC member			
Howard Chou	Colorado	DNC member			
Michael F. Hamrick	Colorado	DNC member			
Nancy DiNardo	Connecticut	DNC member			
John W. Olsen	Connecticut	DNC member			
Erick Russell	Connecticut	DNC member			
Joanne Sullivan	Connecticut	DNC member			
Nancy Wyman	Connecticut	DNC member			
Tony Coelho	Delaware	DNC member			
Sean Finnigan	Delaware	DNC member			
Valerie Longhurst	Delaware	DNC member			
Elizabeth Maron	Delaware	DNC member			
Erik Raser-Schramm	Delaware	DNC member			
Connie Borde	Democrats Abroad	DNC member (Note: DNC members have a half vote each at the convention. (Democrats Abroad))			
Julia Bryan	Democrats Abroad	DNC member			
John A. Eastwood	Democrats Abroad	DNC member			
Adrianne R. George	Democrats Abroad	DNC member			
Martha McDevitt-Pugh	Democrats Abroad	DNC member			
Alex Montgomery	Democrats Abroad	DNC member			
Kenneth E. Sherman	Democrats Abroad	DNC member			
Orlando E. Vidal	Democrats Abroad	DNC member			
James Joseph Boland	(Washington, D.C.) District of Columbia	DNC member			
Calla R. Brown	(Washington, D.C.) District of Columbia	DNC member			
Roxanne D. Brown	(Washington, D.C.) District of Columbia	DNC member			
Maria Cardona	(Washington, D.C.) District of Columbia	DNC member			
Alexandra Chalupa	(Washington, D.C.) District of Columbia	DNC member			
J. David Cox	(Washington, D.C.) District of Columbia	DNC member			
Leah Daughtry	(Washington, D.C.) District of Columbia	DNC member			
Jack Evans	(Washington, D.C.) District of Columbia	DNC member			
Earl D. Fowlkes Jr.	(Washington, D.C.) District of Columbia	DNC member			
Lily L. Eskelsen Garcia	(Washington, D.C.) District of Columbia	DNC member			
Linda L. Gray	(Washington, D.C.) District of Columbia	DNC member			
Harold M. Ickes	(Washington, D.C.) District of Columbia	DNC member			
Claire Lucas	(Washington, D.C.) District of Columbia	DNC member			
Silvia J. Martinez	(Washington, D.C.) District of Columbia	DNC member			
Minyon Moore	(Washington, D.C.) District of Columbia	DNC member			
Carol J. Pensky	(Washington, D.C.) District of Columbia	DNC member			
Carrie Pugh	(Washington, D.C.) District of Columbia	DNC member			
Steve Regenstreif	(Washington, D.C.) District of Columbia	DNC member			
Lee A. Saunders	(Washington, D.C.) District of Columbia	DNC member			
Rick C. Wade	(Washington, D.C.) District of Columbia	DNC member			
Charles E. Wilson	(Washington, D.C.) District of Columbia	DNC member			
Dwight Bullard	Florida	DNC member			
Cynthia M. Busch	Florida	DNC member			
Grace Carrington	Florida	DNC member			
Briana L. Cartwright	Florida	DNC member			
Alan R. Clendenin	Florida	DNC member			
Ken N. Evans	Florida	DNC member			
Alma R. Gonzalez	Florida	DNC member			
Mikaela Guido	Florida	DNC member			
Shawn W. Kinsey	Florida	DNC member			
Chris Korge	Florida	DNC member			
Maureen A. McKenna	Florida	DNC member			
Judy C. Mount	Florida	DNC member			
John A. Ramos	Florida	DNC member			
Terrie Lorraine Rizzo	Florida	DNC member			
Casmore Shaw	Florida	DNC member			
Craig Smith	Florida	DNC member			
Wendy Davis	(Georgia (U.S. state)) Georgia	DNC member			
Daniel J. Halpern	(Georgia (U.S. state)) Georgia	DNC member			
Sheikh Rahman	(Georgia (U.S. state)) Georgia	DNC member			
Richard A. Ray	(Georgia (U.S. state)) Georgia	DNC member			
Sally S. Rosser	(Georgia (U.S. state)) Georgia	DNC member			
Nikema Williams	(Georgia (U.S. state)) Georgia	DNC member			
Jon Junior Calvo	Guam	DNC member			
Regine Biscoe Lee	Guam	DNC member			
Rory Respicio	Guam	DNC member			
Bart E. Dame	Hawaii	DNC member			
Gary Hooser	Hawaii	DNC member			
Jadine Nielsen	Hawaii	DNC member			
Kathleen G. Stanley	Hawaii	DNC member			
Evangeline M. Beechler	Idaho	DNC member			
Susan S. Eastlake	Idaho	DNC member			
Jerry C. Shriner	Idaho	DNC member			
Paulette Jordan	Idaho	DNC member			
Jesse Maldonado	Idaho	DNC member			
Carrie Austin	Illinois	DNC member			
Jerry F. Costello	Illinois	DNC member			
John J. Cullerton	Illinois	DNC member			
Daniel W. Hynes	Illinois	DNC member			
Victoria R. Koffsky	Illinois	DNC member			
Michael Madigan	Illinois	DNC member			
Jayne Mazzotti	Illinois	DNC member			
Becky Strzechowski	Illinois	DNC member			
Karen A. Yarbrough	Illinois	DNC member			
David Frye	Indiana	DNC member			
Cindy S. Henry	Indiana	DNC member			
Cordelia M. Lewis-Burks	Indiana	DNC member			
S. Anthony Long	Indiana	DNC member			
John C. Zody	Indiana	DNC member			
Scott M. Brennan	Iowa	DNC member			
Andrea Phillips	Iowa	DNC member			
Vicki Hiatt	Kansas	DNC member			
Brandon Johnson	Kansas	DNC member			
Teresa Garcia Krusor	Kansas	DNC member			
Christopher T. Reeves	Kansas	DNC member			
Cassie Chambers Armstrong	Kentucky	DNC member			
Susanna French	Kentucky	DNC member			
Charlotte Lundergan	Kentucky	DNC member			
Ben Self	Kentucky	DNC member			
Nathan Gene Smith	Kentucky	DNC member			
Deborah J. Langhoff	Louisiana	DNC member			
Michael McHale	Louisiana	DNC member			
Arthur Morrell	Louisiana	DNC member			
Karen Carter Peterson	Louisiana	DNC member			
Diane Denk	Maine	DNC member			
Erik Gundersen	Maine	DNC member			
Kathleen Marra	Maine	DNC member			
Maria C. Cordone	Maryland	DNC member			
Tefere Gebre	Maryland	DNC member			
Bel W. Leong-Hong	Maryland	DNC member			
Yvette Lewis	Maryland	DNC member			
Robert Martinez Jr.	Maryland	DNC member			
Cory V. McCray	Maryland	DNC member			
Glenard S. Middleton	Maryland	DNC member			
Gregory Pecoraro	Maryland	DNC member			
Marc Perrone	Maryland	DNC member			
Kenneth Rigmaiden	Maryland	DNC member			
Gus Bickford	Massachusetts	DNC member			
Deb Goldberg	Massachusetts	DNC member			
Elaine C. Kamarck	Massachusetts	DNC member			
Debra Kozikowski	Massachusetts	DNC member			
David M. O'Brien	Massachusetts	DNC member			
Melvin Poindexter	Massachusetts	DNC member			
James Roosevelt	Massachusetts	DNC member			
Susan Thomson	Massachusetts	DNC member			
Lavora Barnes	Michigan	DNC member			
Scott Benson	Michigan	DNC member			
Shauna Ryder Diggs	Michigan	DNC member			
Cindy Estrada	Michigan	DNC member			
Paula Herbart	Michigan	DNC member			
Gerald Kariem	Michigan	DNC member			
Daryl Newman	Michigan	DNC member			
Virgie M. Rollins	Michigan	DNC member			
Alexis Wiley	Michigan	DNC member			
J. P. Barone	Minnesota	DNC member			
Debbie Goettel	Minnesota	DNC member			
Ron Harris	Minnesota	DNC member			
Marge Hoffa	Minnesota	DNC member			
Ken Martin	Minnesota	DNC member			
Lori A. Sellner	Minnesota	DNC member			
Elly Zaragoza	Minnesota	DNC member			
Rae Shawn Davis	Mississippi	DNC member			
Bobby Moak	Mississippi	DNC member			
Vicki R. Slater	Mississippi	DNC member			
Jean Peters Baker	Missouri	DNC member			
Persephone Dakopolos	Missouri	DNC member			
Clem Smith	Missouri	DNC member			
Ethan Smith	Missouri	DNC member			
Brian Wahby	Missouri	DNC member			
Max Croes	Montana	DNC member			
Jean Lemire Dahlman	Montana	DNC member			
Robyn Driscoll	Montana	DNC member			
Mary Jenks	Montana	DNC member			
Jorge Quintana	Montana	DNC member			
Ron Kaminski	Nebraska	DNC member			
Jane Fleming Kleeb	Nebraska	DNC member			
Richard Register	Nebraska	DNC member			
Patricia A. Zieg	Nebraska	DNC member			
Artie Blanco	Nevada	DNC member			
William McCurdy II	Nevada	DNC member			
Marty McGarry	Nevada	DNC member			
Sonja Whitten	Nevada	DNC member			
Raymond Buckley	New Hampshire	DNC member			
Joanne Dowdell	New Hampshire	DNC member			
Tonio Burgos	New Jersey	DNC member			
Marcia Marley	New Jersey	DNC member			
George E. Norcross III	New Jersey	DNC member			
Kelly Stewart Maer	New Jersey	DNC member			
Brian Egolf	New Mexico	DNC member			
Marg Elliston	New Mexico	DNC member			
Joni Gutierrez	New Mexico	DNC member			
Marcus Porter	New Mexico	DNC member			
Raymond Sanchez	New Mexico	DNC member			
Stuart H. Appelbaum	(New York (state)) New York	DNC member			
Michael Blake	(New York (state)) New York	DNC member			
Kyle Bragg	(New York (state)) New York	DNC member			
Maria Cuomo Cole	(New York (state)) New York	DNC member			
Vivian E. Cook	(New York (state)) New York	DNC member			
Jennifer Cunningham	(New York (state)) New York	DNC member			
Hazel Duke	(New York (state)) New York	DNC member			
Gregory Floyd	(New York (state)) New York	DNC member			
Emily Giske	(New York (state)) New York	DNC member			
Charlotte Kerpen	(New York (state)) New York	DNC member			
Carl Heastie	(New York (state)) New York	DNC member			
Kathy Hochul	(New York (state)) New York	DNC member			
Jay S. Jacobs	(New York (state)) New York	DNC member			
Charlie King	(New York (state)) New York	DNC member			
Christopher Lowe	(New York (state)) New York	DNC member			
Dennis Mehiel	(New York (state)) New York	DNC member			
Ai-Jen Poo	(New York (state)) New York	DNC member			
Christine Quinn	(New York (state)) New York	DNC member			
Michael Reich	(New York (state)) New York	DNC member			
Andrea Stewart-Cousins	(New York (state)) New York	DNC member			
Gerard J. Sweeney	(New York (state)) New York	DNC member			
Robert Zimmerman	(New York (state)) New York	DNC member			
Denise D. Adams	North Carolina	DNC member			
Wayne Goodwin	North Carolina	DNC member			
Shelia A. Huggins	North Carolina	DNC member			
Cliff Moone	North Carolina	DNC member			
Bobbie Richardson	North Carolina	DNC member			
Diane Robertson	North Carolina	DNC member			
John R. Verdejo	North Carolina	DNC member			
Patrick M. Hart	North Dakota	DNC member			
Kylie Oversen	North Dakota	DNC member			
Nola K. Hix	(Northern Mariana Islands) Northern Marianas	DNC member			
Daniel O. Quitugua	(Northern Mariana Islands) Northern Marianas	DNC member			
Michael A. White	(Northern Mariana Islands) Northern Marianas	DNC member			
Tim Burga	Ohio	DNC member			
Isabel Framer	Ohio	DNC member			
Rebecca L. Higgins	Ohio	DNC member			
Ronald L. Malone	Ohio	DNC member			
Valarie McCall	Ohio	DNC member			
Rhine McLin	Ohio	DNC member			
David A. Pepper	Ohio	DNC member			
Joe Rugola	Ohio	DNC member			
Alicia Andrews	Oklahoma	DNC member			
Kalyn Free	Oklahoma	DNC member			
Dave Ratcliff	Oklahoma	DNC member			
David Walters	Oklahoma	DNC member			
Carla "KC" Hanson	Oregon	DNC member			
Matt K. Keating	Oregon	DNC member			
Peter B. Lee	Oregon	DNC member			
Travis Nelson	Oregon	DNC member			
Ellen Rosenblum	Oregon	DNC member			
Tanya Shively	Oregon	DNC member			
Rick Bloomingdale	Pennsylvania	DNC member			
Ronald Donatucci	Pennsylvania	DNC member			
Peggy Grove	Pennsylvania	DNC member			
Murat Guzel	Pennsylvania	DNC member			
Gerald Lawrence	Pennsylvania	DNC member			
Nancy Patton Mills	Pennsylvania	DNC member			
Ian Murray	Pennsylvania	DNC member			
Evie Rafalko-McNulty	Pennsylvania	DNC member			
Sharif Street	Pennsylvania	DNC member			
Sylvia C. Wilson	Pennsylvania	DNC member			
Luis D. Davila	Puerto Rico	DNC member			
Andrés W. López	Puerto Rico	DNC member			
Margarita Nolasco	Puerto Rico	DNC member			
Manuel Ortiz	Puerto Rico	DNC member			
Charlie Rodríguez	Puerto Rico	DNC member			
Johanne M. Velez	Puerto Rico	DNC member			
Edna O'Neill Mattson	Rhode Island	DNC member			
Joseph M. McNamara	Rhode Island	DNC member			
Joseph R. Paolino Jr.	Rhode Island	DNC member			
Carol K. Fowler	South Carolina	DNC member			
Jaime Harrison	South Carolina	DNC member			
Lessie Price	South Carolina	DNC member			
Travis Robertson Jr.	South Carolina	DNC member			
Nikki Gronli	South Dakota	DNC member			
Deb J. Knecht	South Dakota	DNC member			
Randy Seiler	South Dakota	DNC member			
Bill E. Walsh	South Dakota	DNC member			
Gale Jones Carson	Tennessee	DNC member			
Will T. Cheek	Tennessee	DNC member			
Robert H. Cowan	Tennessee	DNC member			
Mary Mancini	Tennessee	DNC member			
Marisa Richmond	Tennessee	DNC member			
Yvonne Davis	Texas	DNC member			
A. J. Durrani	Texas	DNC member			
Gilberto Hinojosa	Texas	DNC member			
Kat Hoang	Texas	DNC member			
Eric Johnson	Texas	DNC member			
Glen Maxey	Texas	DNC member			
Lorraine C. Miller	Texas	DNC member			
John B. Patrick	Texas	DNC member			
Hasmit R. Popat	Texas	DNC member			
Betty Z. Richie	Texas	DNC member			
Dennis D. Speight	Texas	DNC member			
Senfronia Thompson	Texas	DNC member			
Royce West	Texas	DNC member			
Nadia Mahallati	Utah	DNC member			
Jeff Merchant	Utah	DNC member			
Charles A. Stormont	Utah	DNC member			
Yohannes Abraham	Virginia	DNC member			
Doris Crouse-Mays	Virginia	DNC member			
Morgan W. Jameson	Virginia	DNC member			
Frank Leone	Virginia	DNC member			
Christopher P. Lu	Virginia	DNC member			
Jennifer McClellan	Virginia	DNC member			
Atima Omara	Virginia	DNC member			
Susan R. Swecker	Virginia	DNC member			
Jeion Ward	Virginia	DNC member			
Cecil R. Benjamin	(United States Virgin Islands) U.S. Virgin Islands	DNC member			
Carol M. Burke	(United States Virgin Islands) U.S. Virgin Islands	DNC member			
Carla Joseph	(United States Virgin Islands) U.S. Virgin Islands	DNC member			
Ernest Morris	(United States Virgin Islands) U.S. Virgin Islands	DNC member			
Terje Anderson	Vermont	DNC member			
Tim Jerman	Vermont	DNC member			
Tess Taylor	Vermont	DNC member			
Ed S. Cote	(Washington (state)) Washington	DNC member			
David Green	(Washington (state)) Washington	DNC member			
Juanita G. Luiz	(Washington (state)) Washington	DNC member			
Sharon Mast	(Washington (state)) Washington	DNC member			
David T. McDonald	(Washington (state)) Washington	DNC member			
Nancy E. Monacelli	(Washington (state)) Washington	DNC member			
Candace Mumm	(Washington (state)) Washington	DNC member			
Tina Podlodowski	(Washington (state)) Washington	DNC member			
Janet Bewley	Wisconsin	DNC member			
Martha Marie Love	Wisconsin	DNC member			
Felesia Martin	Wisconsin	DNC member			
Mahlon Mitchell	Wisconsin	DNC member			
Jason Rae	Wisconsin	DNC member			
Andrew Werthmann	Wisconsin	DNC member			
Ben Wikler	Wisconsin	DNC member			
Belinda Biafore	West Virginia	DNC member			
Elaine A. Harris	West Virginia	DNC member			
William Laird IV	West Virginia	DNC member			
Pat Maroney	West Virginia	DNC member			
John Perdue	West Virginia	DNC member			
Joseph M. Barbuto	Wyoming	DNC member			
Jessica S. Chambers	Wyoming	DNC member			
Lucas Fralick	Wyoming	DNC member			
Erin O'Doherty	Wyoming	DNC member			

== See also ==
- 2020 Democratic Party presidential primaries
- List of superdelegates at the 2008 Democratic National Convention
- List of superdelegates at the 2016 Democratic National Convention
