= Andrés López =

Andrés López may refer to:

- Andrés W. López, Puerto Rican member of the Democratic National Committee
- Andrés López Forero (born 1971), Colombian comedian and actor
- Andrés López López (born 1971), Colombian drug trafficker
- Andrés López de Medrano (1780–1856), Dominican philosopher
- Andrés López Polanco (died 1641), Spanish Baroque painter
- Andrés Manuel López Obrador (born 1953), Mexican politician, president in 2018–2024
- Andrés Manuel López Beltrán (born 1986), Mexican politician, son of the above
- Andrés López (badminton) (born 1992), Mexican badminton player
- Andrés López (footballer) (born 1993), Ecuadorian footballer
- Andrés López (painter) (fl. 1763–1811), Mexican painter
