= Sebastian Steiger =

Sebastian Steiger (1918 – 2012) was a teacher and Righteous Among the Nations from Switzerland.

== Biography ==
Sebastian Steiger was the son of a Calvinist pastor. He studied at the teacher training seminar in Schiers. Between the years 1940 and 1943, he studied at the teacher training seminar in Zürich.

== His Activity on Behalf of Jews During the Nazi Regime ==
At the beginning of 1943, Steiger was sent from Switzerland to work at the orphanage in Château de la Hille in Ariège. The orphanage was managed by the "Secours Suisse aux Enfants" organization, founded by Maurice Dubois, and was a branch of the Swiss Red Cross. Among the residents of the orphanage were 120 Jewish children who had fled from Germany to Belgium after Kristallnacht. Steiger taught mathematics and French to the elementary school-aged children. Additionally, he took the children on excursions in the area, taught them songs, and told them stories. At the end of 1943, he gave his Swiss passport to a Jew, after altering the passport photo, to save the Jew from deportation. This Jew, Walter Kamlet, managed to escape to Switzerland using Steiger's passport. Steiger continued to reside in France without his passport. When he sought to return to Switzerland, he was arrested by the Swiss police until he managed to prove his identity.

== After the War ==
After the war, Steiger continued his studies in special education and pursued a teaching career in Arlesheim and Basel. He also continued his activities on behalf of Jews. He founded an association to assist Jewish children. He married in 1956 and had three children. Between 1958 and 1990, he led annual memorial events on the Day of Remembrance for the Jewish children who perished in the Holocaust (Tag des jüdischen Kindes). He was a member of the German Coordination Committee for Jewish-Christian Cooperation, the Swiss-Israeli Association, and the Friends of Kiryat Yearim Children.

In 1982, Steiger published a book about his experiences as a teacher at Château de la Hille ("Die Kinder von Schloss La Hille"). In 1985, Steiger visited Lehavot HaBashan and met with the children he had educated at Château de la Hille.
