= Joe Lhota =

American politician and government official

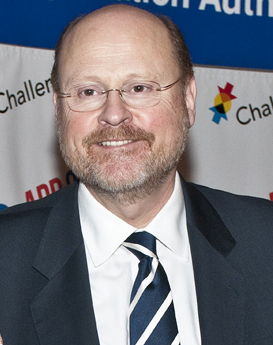
- Lhota in 2012

13th Chairman of the Metropolitan Transportation Authority
- In office June 21, 2017 – November 8, 2018
- Governor: Andrew Cuomo
- Preceded by: Thomas F. Prendergast; Fernando Ferrer (acting)
- Succeeded by: Fernando Ferrer (acting); Pat Foye

11th Chairman and CEO of the Metropolitan Transportation Authority
- In office January 9, 2012 – December 31, 2012
- Governor: Andrew Cuomo
- Preceded by: Jay Walder
- Succeeded by: Fernando Ferrer (acting); Thomas F. Prendergast

Deputy Mayor of New York City for Operations
- In office July 2, 1998 – 2001
- Preceded by: Randy Mastro
- Succeeded by: Marc Shaw

Director of the New York City Mayor's Office of Management and Budget
- In office 1995–1998
- Preceded by: Marc Shaw
- Succeeded by: Mark N. Page

Personal details
- Born: October 7, 1954 (age 72) New York City, New York, U.S.
- Party: Democratic (2021–present)
- Other political affiliations: Republican (before 2020); Independent (2020–2021)
- Education: Georgetown University (BA); Harvard University (MBA)

Joseph J. Lhota (/ˈloʊtə/; born October 7, 1954) is an American public servant and politician who served as the chairman of the Metropolitan Transportation Authority and served as New York City deputy mayor for operations from 1998 to 2001. He was the Republican nominee in an unsuccessful bid for the 2013 election for Mayor of New York City. In January 2014, he became senior vice president, vice dean, and chief of staff at NYU Langone Medical Center. In 2017, he returned to the chairmanship of the MTA, but would not run the authority day-to-day. He resigned from that position in 2018.

== Early life and education ==
Joe Lhota was born in the Bronx, New York, the son of Jackie and Joseph "Joe" Lhota, a New York City police officer. Lhota was raised Catholic in Pelham Bay, and self-identifies as a Christian. The family later moved to Lindenhurst. He was the first member of his family to attend college, graduating with honors from Georgetown University's McDonough School of Business with a degree in business administration in 1976. He received an M.B.A. degree from Harvard Business School in 1980.

== Private sector career ==
Upon graduating from Georgetown University, Lhota joined Arthur Andersen & Co. in Washington, D.C. and specialized in health care finance. He worked there for two years before entering the Harvard Business School. Following Harvard, Lhota returned to New York City and began a fourteen-year career as an investment banker at First Boston and Paine Webber. He specialized in public finance, serving state and local governments throughout the United States.

In 2002, Lhota became executive vice president of Cablevision, as well as president of Lightpath, a fiber-based telecommunications company that offered telephone and high speed data services to businesses throughout the New York area. In 2010, he joined The Madison Square Garden Company as executive vice president as a member of the senior management team and chief administrative officer.

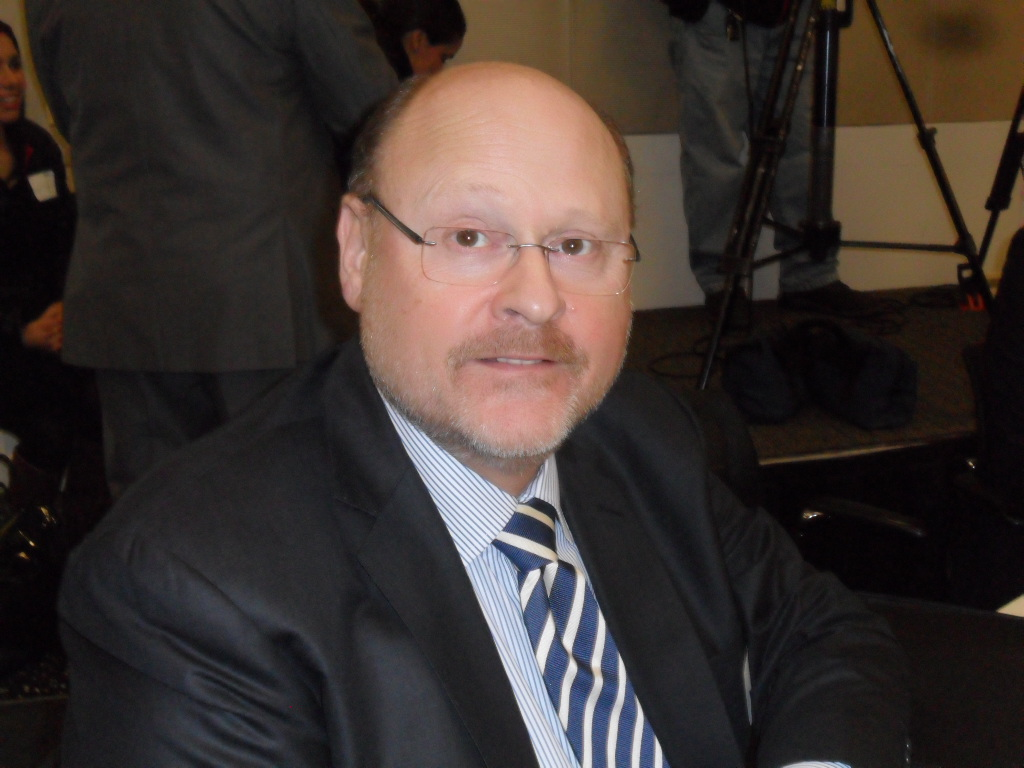
Lhota in January 2015

In early 2014, after his mayoral run, Lhota was appointed as senior vice president, vice dean, and chief of staff at NYU Langone Medical Center, in charge of "government outreach", emergency preparedness, and business planning.

From 2002 to 2015, Lhota served as a member of the board of directors of First Aviation Services, Inc. In 2015, FAVS became a private company. In 2014, Lhota became a board member of Cablevision Systems Corporation and was chairman of its audit committee until the company was sold in June 2016 to Altice USA.

In 2016, Lhota became an independent member of the board of directors and chairman of the audit committee of MSG Networks.

== Public service career ==
=== Giuliani administration ===
In 1994, Lhota joined the administration of Mayor Rudy Giuliani, where he held several positions over Giuliani's two terms. He first served as chief of staff to the deputy mayor for finance and economic development and that year was quickly promoted to New York City finance commissioner. In 1995, he was selected as director of the New York City Mayor's Office of Management and Budget. In 1998, Giuliani appointed Lhota to deputy mayor for operations. As the head of the mayor's rat abatement task force, he was humorously known as "the Rat Czar".

Lhota served as Mayor Giuliani's liaison to the White House, United States Congress, governor of New York, New York State Legislature and New York City Council. Additionally, he was responsible for oversight of the city's relationships with the public employee unions and development of collective bargaining agreement strategies.

=== Chairman of the Metropolitan Transportation Authority ===
On October 20, 2011, New York State Governor Andrew Cuomo nominated Lhota to serve as chairman of the Metropolitan Transportation Authority, the largest mass transit provider in the United States (servicing 8.5 million customers daily). While awaiting confirmation by the New York State Senate, Lhota began serving as interim CEO. He was unanimously confirmed on January 9, 2012.

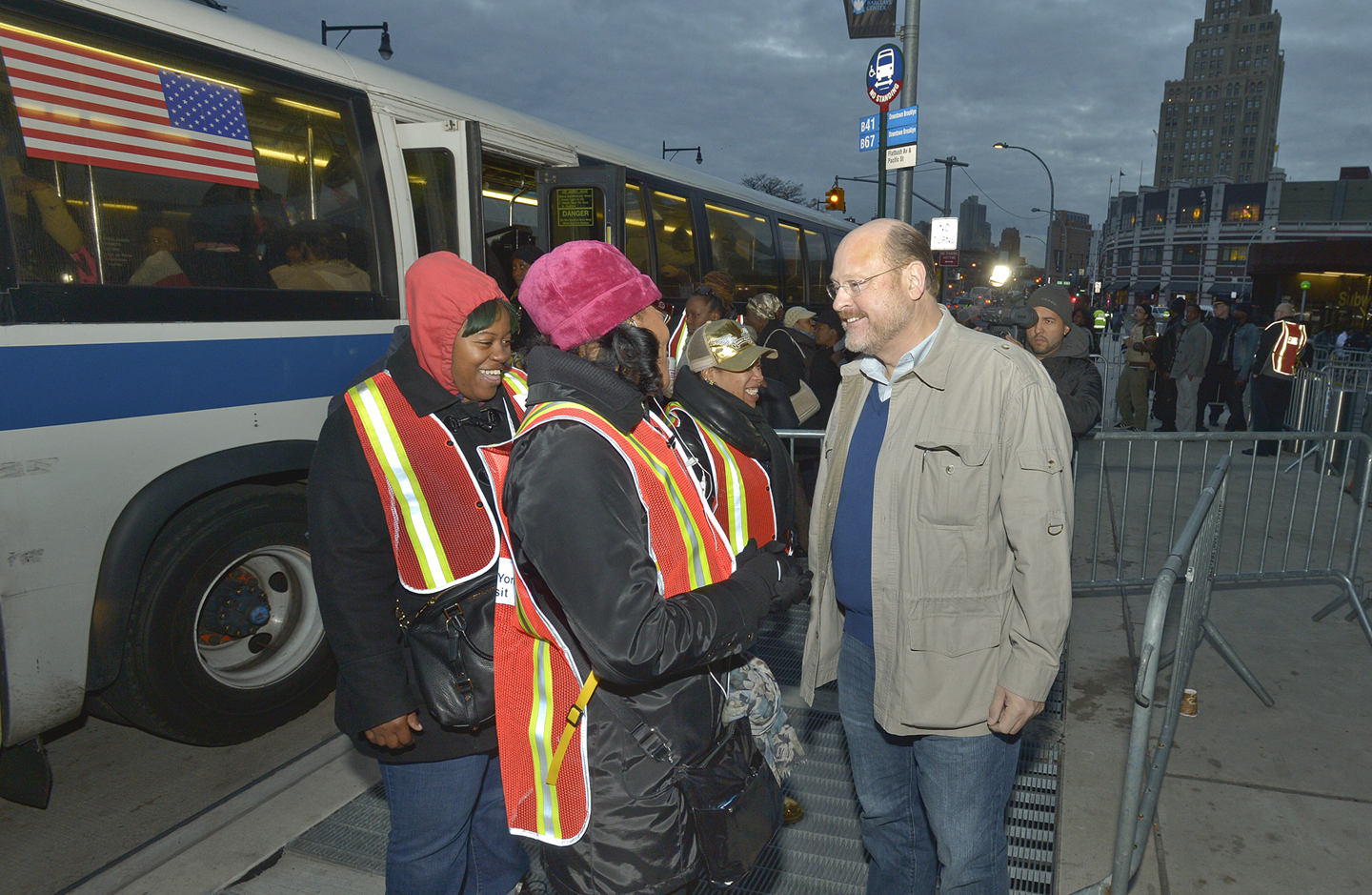
MTA Chair Joe Lhota speaks with transit workers during Sandy recovery efforts at Brooklyn's Atlantic Terminal

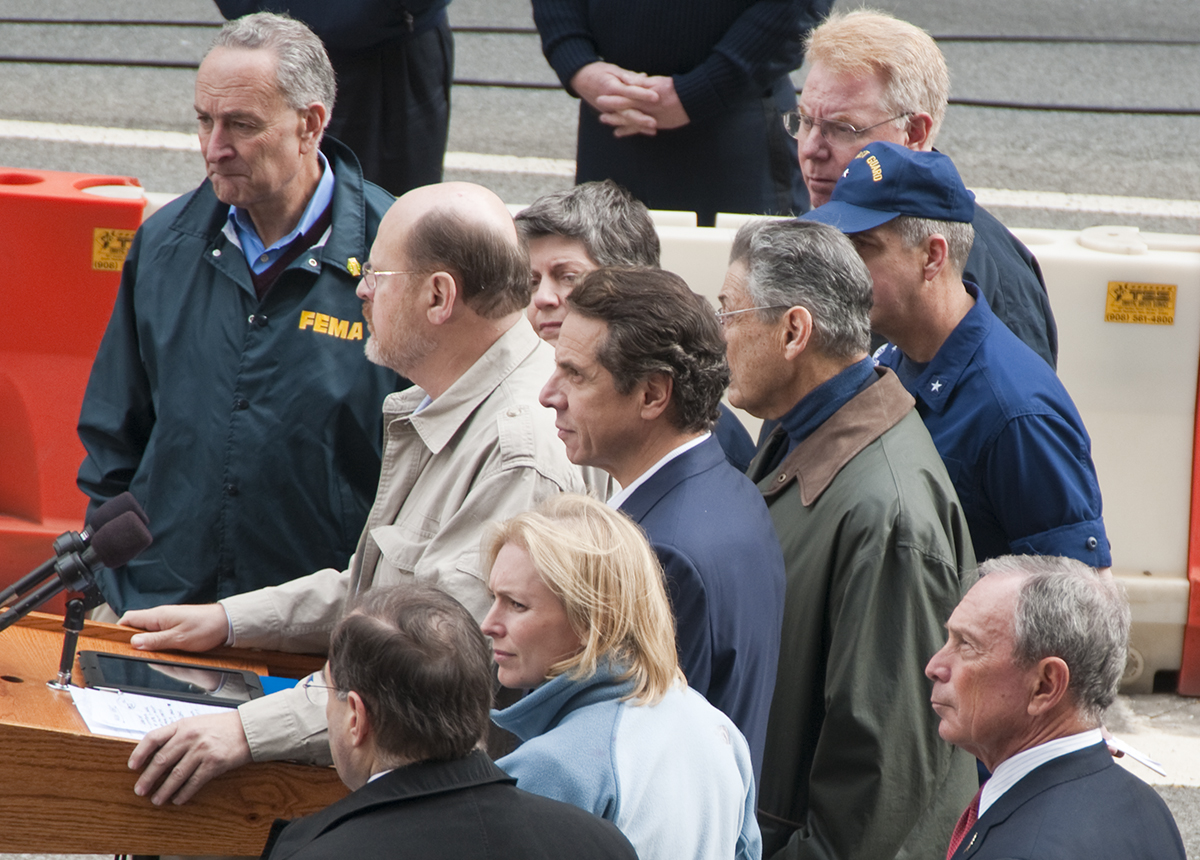
Lhota giving a press briefing at the Hugh L. Carey Tunnel with Governor Cuomo and federal, state and city officials.

Lhota was responsible for New York City Transit’s Fastrack program, which saw more than $16 million in productivity gains in 2012, by concentrating and targeting subway station maintenance efforts. In July 2012, Lhota announced a $30 million service enhancement package that restored transportation services that the MTA had previously eliminated in 2010, and added new transit services in underserved areas, including Williamsburg, the South Bronx and Brooklyn Navy Yard—all New York City neighborhoods that had seen significant residential and commercial development since 2005. Lhota headed efforts to make information about the MTA and its services more accessible to its customers through its website and apps. He granted pay raises to managers at the MTA.

When Hurricane Sandy devastated much of the New York metropolitan area in October 2012, Lhota shut down the MTA in advance of the storm and moved the system's trains to high ground to avoid damage from the storm surge. His other notable hurricane recovery measure was the rapid deployment of a free Rockaway Park Shuttle to service the worst damaged line in Rockaway, Queens. Lhota also directed the MTA to provide regular details and updates to the public on the recovery efforts via social media and local news channels.

=== 2013 Mayoral candidacy ===
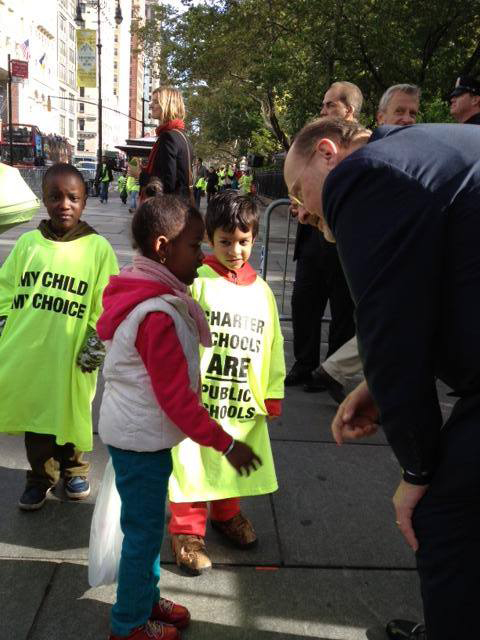
Lhota speaks to a child to march at a School Choice rally across the Brooklyn Bridge along with parents from low income neighborhoods in 2013

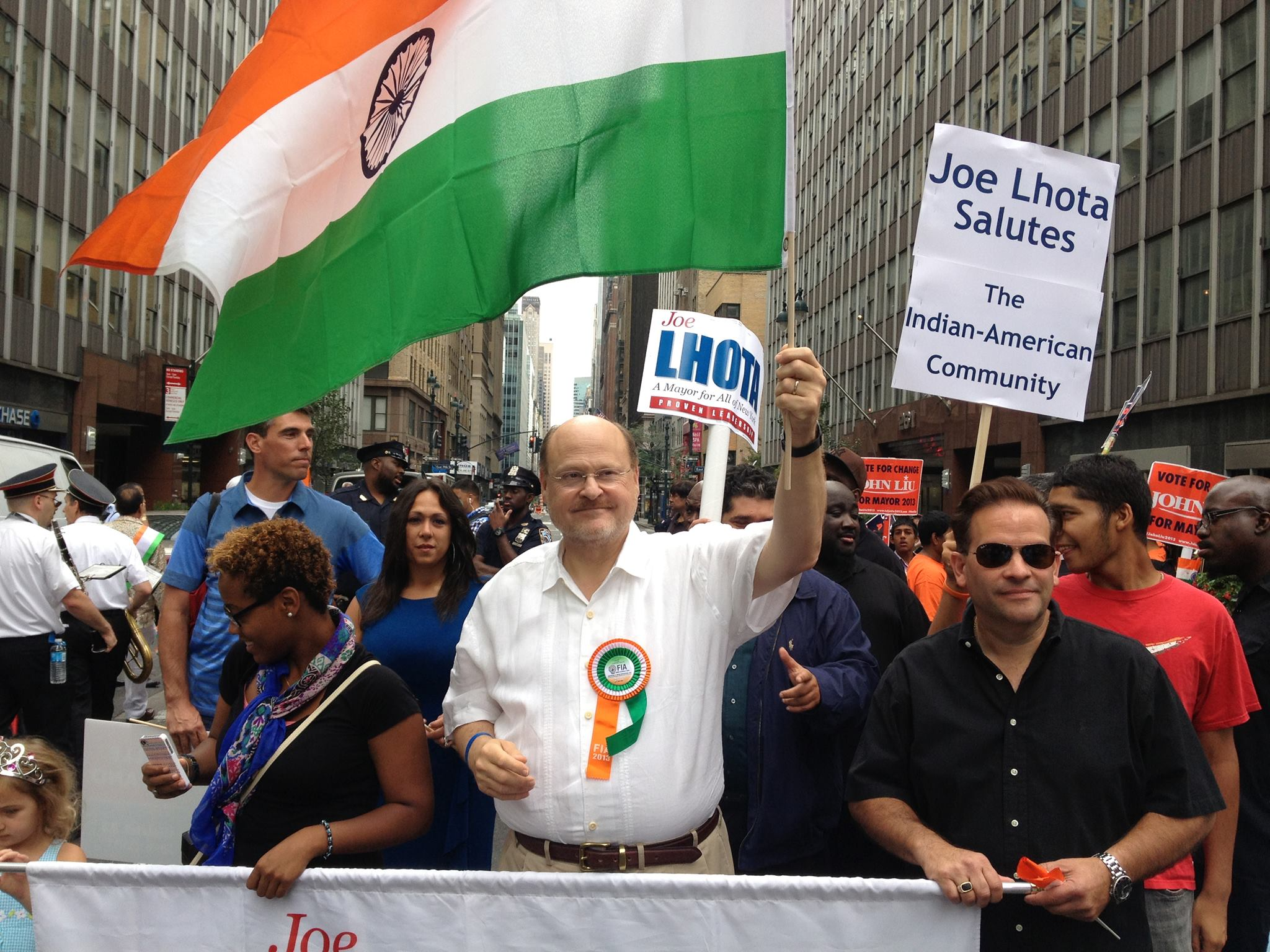
Lhota marches in a parade during his 2013 run for mayor

Lhota resigned as head of the MTA on December 31, 2012, to explore running for mayor of New York City. On January 17, 2013, he filed paperwork with the New York City Board of Elections and the New York State Board of Elections to formally launch his mayoral campaign.

In August 2013, after an MTA subway line was temporarily stopped to rescue two kittens on the tracks in Brooklyn, Lhota's campaign spokesperson told media outlets that while it was the MTA's decision, he would not have shut down the lines. The New York Daily News then featured him on their front page under the headline: "Die, Kitties, Die," while Republican primary opponent John Catsimatidis criticized him in a New York Post article titled "Cats loves cats... and Lhota doesn't." Some candidates in the Democratic primary said they would have stopped the trains, with Anthony Weiner's spokesperson saying "If Anthony is elected mayor, he will not only stop trains for kittens, he will personally crawl over the third rail to do it."

Lhota won the endorsements of all three major daily New York City newspapers for the Republican primary, with The New York Times stating, "few people know better than Mr. Lhota how city government works." He won the primary on September 10, 2013, with 52.5% of the vote, defeating John Catsimatidis, who garnered 40.7%, and George T. McDonald, who captured 6.8%.

In the general election campaign, Lhota received the endorsements of Crain's New York Business, AM New York, Newsday, and The Jewish Voice.

Lhota's economic plan focused on job creation primarily through municipal tax cuts. He said he wanted to lower the General Corporation Tax, phase out the Commercial Rent Tax, reform the Unincorporated Business Tax, and lower the hotel tax.

Lhota also proposed a tax incentive program to allow private sector developers to build mixed-use housing to incorporate affordable units. He planned to improve education in New York City by doubling the number of public charter schools, particularly in low-income neighborhoods. He participated in a School Choice Rally organized by Success Academy Charter Schools to protest Democratic candidate Bill de Blasio's proposed rent requirement for the city's charter schools that were operating in public school buildings and ban on further co-location in public school buildings. He also proposed universal pre-kindergarten without raising taxes.

Lhota lost the general election to de Blasio, garnering 249,121 votes, or 24.3% of the voter turnout.

=== Return to MTA ===
In January 2017, Governor Cuomo appointed Lhota to the committee charged with conducting a nationwide search for a new chair and chief executive officer of the MTA. In June 2017, Lhota was nominated by Cuomo to return to Chairman of the MTA. Lhota remained at NYU Langone, as he would not be the day-to-day executive of the MTA; that role was instead filled by Veronique Hakim.

Lhota's return to the MTA occurred in the middle of the subway's transit crisis. In summer 2017, the subway system was officially put in a state of emergency after a series of derailments, track fires, and overcrowding incidents. Cuomo ordered Lhota to come up with a reorganization plan for the subway within 30 days. Lhota's plan involved removing seats from subway cars, consolidating the subway's scattered operations, managing escalators and elevators, and repairing damaged and critically important signals and tracks. The MTA had been criticized for implementing relatively cosmetic improvements, rather than performing needed repairs and upgrades to signals, power, tracks, station accessibility, and infrastructure. In response, Lhota said that the MTA was improving passenger experience not only on the trains, but also in the stations.

On November 9, 2018, Lhota resigned his position as chairman of the MTA, effective immediately, without having taken his $1-a-year salary. A Wall Street Journal article in October 2018 had speculated that Lhota was considering retiring because of potential conflicts of interest with his other roles as NYU Langone Health chief of staff, and as a lobbyist, though Lhota repudiated these claims. In July 2019, it was revealed that Lhota did resign in a letter to Cuomo due to a state ethics committee decision that he had too strong a potential conflict of interest.

== Personal life ==
Lhota is married to Tamra Roberts Lhota. The couple met while she was working in Washington, D.C. They have one child.

While he was raised Catholic and identifies as Christian, Lhota's maternal grandmother was Jewish. When asked why he didn't capitalize on his grandmother’s religious heritage to garner the city's Jewish voters, he responded, "I think that would be patronizing."

=== Political beliefs ===
Lhota defended his support for pro-choice and same-sex marriage as not only being in sync with New York City's socially liberal outlook but consistent with Jeffersonian republicanism or democracy and its intellectual premise in classical liberalism. Lhota called for expulsion of Donald Trump from the Republican Party after Trump's remarks about banning Muslims from entering the United States. He later left the party in protest of Trump's policies. Lhota endorsed Joe Biden in the 2020 United States presidential election.

Lhota revealed in 2021 that he was now a registered Democrat. He endorsed Kathryn Garcia for first preference in the 2021 New York City Democratic mayoral primary, with Eric Adams and Andrew Yang as his second and third picks, respectively.

Political offices
| Preceded by Jay Walder | Chairman of the Metropolitan Transportation Authority; 2012 | Succeeded by Fernando Ferrer; Acting |
| Preceded by Fernando Ferrer; Acting | Chairman of the Metropolitan Transportation Authority; 2017–2018 | Succeeded by Fernando Ferrer; Acting |
Party political offices
| Preceded by Michael Bloomberg; Endorsed | Republican nominee for Mayor of New York City; 2013 | Succeeded by Nicole Malliotakis |
