= The Doe Fund =

American nonprofit organization

- Founded: 1985
- Type: 501(c)(3) non-profit
- Location: New York, NY
- Region served: New York, NY and Philadelphia, PA.
- Method: Paid transitional work and housing; occupational training and life skills
- Budget: $55 million annual operating budget
- Website: http://www.doe.org

The Doe Fund is a nonprofit organization in the United States that provides paid transitional work, housing, educational opportunities, counseling, and career training to people with histories of homelessness, incarceration, and substance abuse.

The Doe Fund runs Ready, Willing & Able, a "work first" program contracted to New York City; the program aims to secure permanent housing and employment for the homeless and to break the cycles of homelessness, addiction and criminal recidivism.

== Origins ==
The Doe Fund was founded in 1985 by George T. McDonald during a sharp rise in homelessness in New York City. McDonald, an executive in the private sector at that time, began by distributing food to homeless people on the floor of Grand Central Terminal for 700 consecutive nights. McDonald later recalled people telling him "'…this is a great sandwich, but I really wish I had a room to stay in and a job to pay for it.' People wanted to work, and I wanted to help." George McDonald's beliefs differ from many other homeless activists; he is more conservative and places an emphasis on putting the homeless to work, a philosophy referred to as "work-first."

== Leadership and early history ==
George McDonald, founder of The Doe Fund, was working as a garment industry executive when he became conscious of New York's growing homeless population. He was motivated to do something about it by the teachings of his Catholic school education stressing the importance of community service and supporting those who are less fortunate.

He started by handing out sandwiches at Grand Central Terminal while running for United States Congress. Though his three runs were unsuccessful, the visibility he gained from campaigning provided him a platform from which to advocate for the homeless.

In 1985, a homeless woman known only as "Mama"—whom McDonald had fed and befriended— died of exposure, the result of spending the night on a concrete sidewalk after being ejected from Grand Central Terminal on Christmas Eve by Metro-North police, despite her pneumonia and the freezing temperatures outside. The incident led McDonald to redirect his executive career to focus on providing the homeless with a way off the streets. He created the organization he called The Doe Fund in honor of “Mama Doe.”

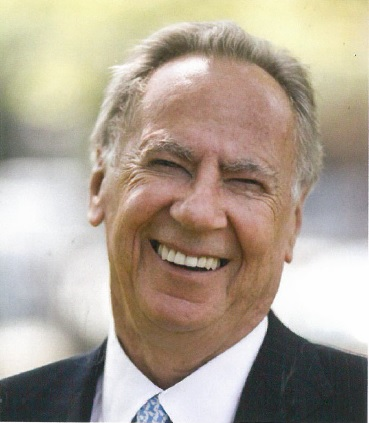
Doe Fund founder and president George T. McDonald

Three years later, he lost another homeless friend from the terminal. According to news accounts at that time, April Savino was a spirited and smart but crack-addicted teenager, who, having lost all hope for a better life, took her own life on the steps of Saint Agnes Church on East 43rd St.

At her funeral, McDonald gave the eulogy and afterwards was approached by Harriet Karr-McDonald (then Harriet Karr), a screenwriter and actress from Beverly Hills.

Karr-McDonald, who grew up in Greenwich Village, became close to April while in New York researching a screenplay about homeless people living in Grand Central Terminal. Karr-McDonald had arranged for her to enter a rehabilitation center. Once April completed treatment, Karr-McDonald intended to adopt her and bring her home - but April hid from her on the day they were scheduled to leave New York. Karr-McDonald has said her inability to save April influenced her decision to devote her life to the homeless and move to New York to work with George McDonald. Within six months, the two were married and subsequently established further Doe Fund initiatives together.

As The Doe Fund's Executive Vice President, Karr-McDonald presided over development of the organization's programs and its fund-raising efforts.

On January 8, 2021, it was announced that Karr-McDonald would succeed her husband as CEO of The Doe Fund. Later that month, on January 26, McDonald died of complications related to lung cancer at the age of 76.

== Ready, Willing & Able ==
Since 1990, the Doe Fund has won more than $262 million in contracts from New York City, primarily for Ready, Willing & Able, a transitional project to employ and house the homeless. Performance evaluations of Ready, Willing, & Able by the city have been mixed.

Work includes cleaning litter and working on shelters. The project is supported by both the city and by private donations; Michael R. Bloomberg was a major donor in the past. The Doe Fund's recent contracts were awarded via "negotiated acquisition", which limits the amount of competition for them.

To enter the program, participants must pledge abstinence from using drugs and alcohol, forego entitlements (with the exception of Medicaid), and agree to submit to random, twice-weekly drug tests. They also must sign waivers allowing The Doe Fund to identify orders for any current or past child support they may owe. Once accepted, they move into one of Ready, Willing & Able's dormitory-style residences, and, following a month of counseling and orientation during which they receive a small weekly stipend, they are put to work for 30 hours a week and are paid the state minimum wage. All are first assigned to a Ready, Willing & Able cleaning crew, after which they can transition to work in the culinary arts, as drivers, on security details, or in other assignments—most of these positions created by The Doe Fund's various social entrepreneurial ventures. All take classes in life and computer skills, job preparation and financial management. After three months, they are offered occupational training in fields that include culinary arts, green building maintenance and pest control. Graduation from the program comes 9–12 months later, once they have found full-time employment, are living in their own non-subsidized apartments, maintaining complete sobriety and, if applicable, paying child support. Sixty-two percent graduate from the program.

A Harvard University study by criminal justice expert Dr. Bruce Western which tracked Ready, Willing & Able's formerly incarcerated clients for two years after their graduations, found that they were 45% less likely to be reconvicted than other parolees. A follow-up study by Western found that they were 60% less likely to be convicted of a felony than other parolees within three years. The resulting savings in social service and criminal justice expenses exceeded the program's costs by 21%, the study found.

== Social ventures ==
The Doe Fund operates social entrepreneurial ventures that provide paid apprenticeships and career training to Ready, Willing & Able trainees, including:

- Pest at Rest, a commercial and residential pest control service that prepares trainees to take a state licensing exam as pesticide applicators.
- Culinary Arts Program, which provides trainees with training and job experience in food handling and preparation, hospitality and basic nutrition. Participants cook and serve 900 meals a day for residents of The Doe Fund's four facilities and cater events in Greater New York.

== Funding ==
While some of The Doe Fund's projects are self-sustaining, the charity also receives funding from major corporations, foundations, and private individuals, including Michael Bloomberg. It has received multiple grants from the Carnegie Corporation, which has supported more than 550 New York City arts and social service institutions since its inception in 2002. In June 2011, The Doe Fund was one of seven organizations to receive a grant from the U.S. Department of Labor (DOL) through the Enhanced Transitional Jobs Demonstration program. The $5.6 million award was given to support the Ready, Willing & Able transitional jobs program and was earmarked to help parolees—many of them non-custodial parents—gain employment and stay out of prison. The DOL set a goal for the funded programs to cut their participants expected criminal recidivism rates by half.

== Awards ==
The work of The Doe Fund and its founder has received numerous awards and honors. The Department of Housing and Urban Development (HUD) has given it multiple honors, including HUD's first-ever Award for Best Practices, instituted in 1999.

The Manhattan Institute for Policy Research awarded the William E. Simon Prize for Lifetime Achievement in Social Entrepreneurship to McDonald in 2008 for his work-based programs to reduce homelessness and criminal recidivism. The institute credited McDonald with “changing the way the problem of homelessness is understood, going far beyond the provision of shelter to help former street people and prisoners regain their self-respect and become productive citizens.” Also in 2008, St. John's University awarded McDonald its Spirit of Service Award and the United States Interagency Council on Homelessness presented The Doe Fund with its 2008 Innovator of Special Merit Award.

McDonald was honored personally in 2004 with a New York Post Liberty Medal Award, which the newspaper bestows annually upon individuals who “epitomize the city’s unsung heroes.”

== Criticism ==
Early in The Doe Fund's existence, McDonald got in disputes with New York's Coalition for the Homeless for whom he used to volunteer. At issue was that Ready, Willing & Able charged the homeless to stay in their city-financed shelters.

In 2006, the U.S. Department of Labor conducted audits of each of its Welfare-to-Work contracts, one of which had been awarded to The Doe Fund. The initial audit report stated that approximately $1.6 million of a $5 million grant (about 32%) was improperly allocated, though this finding was revised in a subsequent 2008 review, which determined that more than two-thirds (about 67%) of the previously disallowed funds had been properly administered.

The New York Daily News said McDonald had blurred the lines between his personal and professional life by pocketing the $100,000 honorarium accompanying the 2008 William E. Simon Prize for Lifetime Achievement in Social Entrepreneurship. The Daily News said it was intended for his charity, though The Doe Fund's board voted to award it to him for his leadership. The Manhattan Institute issued a clarification stating that these honoraria are awarded to individuals "in the tradition of Nobel Prize and MacArthur 'genius' awards" and that the money was intended for McDonald individually. The Manhattan Institute has since presented honorarium checks in the name of the award winner, as was customary before they began administering the prize in 2007.

In 2009, the New York Post criticized the charity, questioning the compensation it paid McDonald. In a response letter, the chairman of The Doe Fund's board of directors wrote that their executive compensation is comparable to other non-profit organizations of a similar size and complexity. The Better Business Bureau (BBB) said that The Doe Fund meets all 20 BBB Standards for Charity Accountability, and that McDonald's salary is less than 1% of the organization's operating budget.

A 2010 report by The New York Times questioned whether donations to The Doe Fund by New York City Mayor Michael Bloomberg or his charities were an attempt to influence testimony in support of Bloomberg's 2008 bid to overturn term limits. After Bloomberg's requests for testimony from charities he supported, McDonald and about 20 Doe Fund employees testified in City Council hearings in favor of easing term limits. Bloomberg had been a Doe Fund supporter since "long before he first ran for office," according to a mayoral spokesman, and had made large contributions in the years before and after the hearing. A Doe Fund spokesman quoted in the report said McDonald had given continued "vocal opposition to term limits" for city officials since 1993 when he supported the Coalition for Voters Choice in its unsuccessful efforts to prevent the term limits measure from becoming law.
