= George T. McDonald =

American social worker and philanthropist (1944–2021)

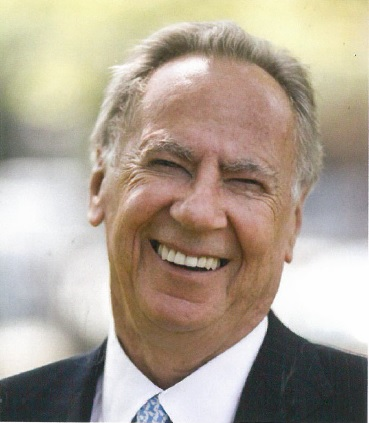
- Born: George Thomas McDonald; April 28, 1944; Spring Lake, New Jersey, U.S.
- Died: January 26, 2021 (aged 76); Manhattan, New York, U.S.
- Occupations: Social activist; philanthropist
- Known for: Founder of The Doe Fund

George Thomas McDonald (April 28, 1944 – January 26, 2021) was an American philanthropist and social worker who was known for being the founder of homeless advocacy group The Doe Fund.

== Early life ==
McDonald was born in Spring Lake, New Jersey, on April 28, 1944, to Helen (née Storminger) and John McDonald. His mother was a homemaker and his father was an insurance executive. He grew up in a single parent household with his father leaving before he was born. He spent much of his early years visiting his mother who was in a hospital with tuberculosis. He attended a Catholic elementary and middle school. He would attribute his upbringing to the learnings from priests in the school. He was known to have had ambitions to becoming the President and had subscribed to The Congressional Record as early as 8.

== Career ==
In the mid-1960s, he dropped out of college and went on to join a department store as a salesman in New Jersey, before going on to serving as an executive on clothing companies in New York's Garment District. It was at this time that he was exposed to the homeless in New York City's parks, subways, and streets. He quit his job in the mid-1980s, and took a vow of poverty. He volunteered at the Coalition for the Homeless, serving the homeless at the Grand Central Terminal. When a homeless acquaintance of his, later named "Mama Doe", died on Christmas day, when she was expelled from camping at the terminal, he set up The Doe Fund to pressure city officials to find homes for the homeless.

In 1988, he received a contract from the city to help renovate some of the city's unused buildings by employing people experiencing homelessness to perform basic construction and renovation. However, the fund was staring at bankruptcy when the city sold off the buildings that the group was working on. It was then that he started a street worker program, initially shoveling snow from streets on the Upper East Side, and later getting a street cleaning deal. This was the time that the program's jobs program Ready, Willing, & Able, was launched. During the 1990s, as welfare programs came under political attack, he advocated for low-wage jobs as a means to encourage social mobility. The fund then provided job training, placement services, and meals for the homeless. The fund also provides transitional beds, affordable housing, and support for HIV/AIDS patients, low income families, and those suffering from mental and physical disabilities.

McDonald ran an unsuccessful campaign for the mayoral position for New York City in 2013. He was on the board of Port Authority of New York and New Jersey from 2017 until his death.

== Personal life ==
He had two marriages that ended in divorce before he married Harriet Karr. McDonald met Karr, a screenwriter, who had earlier written a script on April Savino, a nineteen year old homeless woman, at the latter's funeral. McDonald died on January 26, 2021, from cancer at the NewYork-Presbyterian Hospital in Manhattan, New York.
