= Melissa Russo =

American television journalist

- Born: November 19, 1968 (age 57)
- Agent: N.S. Bienstock Inc.
- Notable credit: Reporter (WNBC)

Melissa Russo (born November 19, 1968) is a television journalist currently working for WNBC-TV News Channel 4 in New York City.

She joined WNBC-TV in September 1998, where she is also a Government Affairs reporter. Previously, she was the co-anchor for the News 4 New York at the 6pm and 11pm Saturday newscasts.

She has worked several stories relating to purported problems with New York City and State agencies. In particular, she often reports on services provided to disadvantaged groups like senior citizens and the homeless. Russo was part of the team that launched a series of politics podcasts on WNBC in 2017.

Before joining WNBC-TV, she worked as a political reporter for NY1 News, where she began working in 1992 and was one host of that network's political interview show, Inside City Hall.

Russo graduated from The Dalton School in 1986 before attending Tufts University, where she received a bachelor's degree in Political Science in 1990.
