= Gregory Floyd =

Gregory Floyd is the President of Teamsters Local 237, City Employees Union in New York, a position he has held since March 30, 2007.

== Background ==
Gregory Floyd began his career as a hospital police officer over twenty years ago. A committed worker, Floyd became the youngest New York City Health + Hospitals Police captain in the HHC’s history, at the age of 27. HHC is the largest municipal healthcare organization in the U.S. Soon after, Gregory became the vice president of the New York City Hospital Police Guardians Association, and in 1994, he was appointed as Teamsters local 237 deputy director for peace officer titles. Floyd’s success continued, as later that year he was appointed secretary to the New York State AFL-CIO’s Committee of Peace and Law Enforcement Officers. It was not until 1999 that Floyd became the director of Local 237’s Citywide Division, where his notoriety grew when he acted as a key player in the fight to save the title of ‘hospital police special officer’ from elimination, due to privatization. Four years later, at the beginning of 2003, Floyd was elected to serve as a trustee on Local 237's executive board, just a year before he was also made the union's secretary-treasurer and chief negotiator. All of these positions led to Gregory Floyd's eventual rise to become the union's fifth president in its 55-year history, on March 30, 2007, when he was appointed by the Union's executive board. In November 2009, Floyd won his first election, continuing as Union President.

== Current appointments ==
As president of Local 237, the largest local in the 1.4 million Teamsters Union and the International Brotherhood of Teamsters (IBT), Floyd represents a varied group of 25,000 New York employees from both New York City agencies and the Housing Authority, ranging from school safety agents and taxi inspectors to x-ray technicians and city attorneys. The Union also represents blue and white collar workers employed by municipalities and school districts throughout Long Island. Gregory Floyd presently serves as a trustee to the board of the New York City Employee Retirement System (NYCERS), one of the largest public pension funds in the United States. He also serves as a commissioner of the board of the IBT Human Rights Commission (he was appointed by IBT General President James P. Hoffa), while also holding a seat on the board of Group Health Insurance (GHI), and the Health Insurance Plan of New York (HIP). In addition, Floyd serves as the vice president of the New York State AFL-CIO and the New York Central Labor Council, as well serving as a trustee of Teamsters Joint Council 16. He is also on the board of trustees for the Council for Unity, an organization based in New York that promotes safety and unity in schools and communities around the city.

== 2010 Local 237 Presidential Election ==
After being appointed president of Local 237 and serving for two years, Floyd was elected to his first full term in 2009.

== Contract negotiations ==
In his years as Local 237's chief negotiator Floyd has attained contracts that provide reasonable wage increases, and that have maintained health and pension benefits for Local 237 union members.

== Advocacy ==
Gregory Floyd is a strong advocate for maintaining affordable housing, rallying to ensure that people are not left homeless from the privatization of housing in densely populated areas. He has continuously fought and rallied to ensure that affordable housing is available to those who require it, and has successfully lobbied State and Federal agencies to obtain the funds necessary for the upkeep and maintenance of the New York City Housing Authority. Floyd organized a large contingent of public employees to attend the One Nation Rally in October, 2010, in Washington D.C.

Floyd is the host of Reaching Out With Greg Floyd, a public affairs program that airs on WWRL AM 1600 and cable TV channels throughout New York City. He is a frequent guest and commentator on local and national news programs.

== Personal life ==
Gregory Floyd is married to writer Wendy Bolton Floyd, the author of When Did You Know ... He Was Not The One? The couple has two children, Jessica and Jonathan.
