= Maurice Dubois =

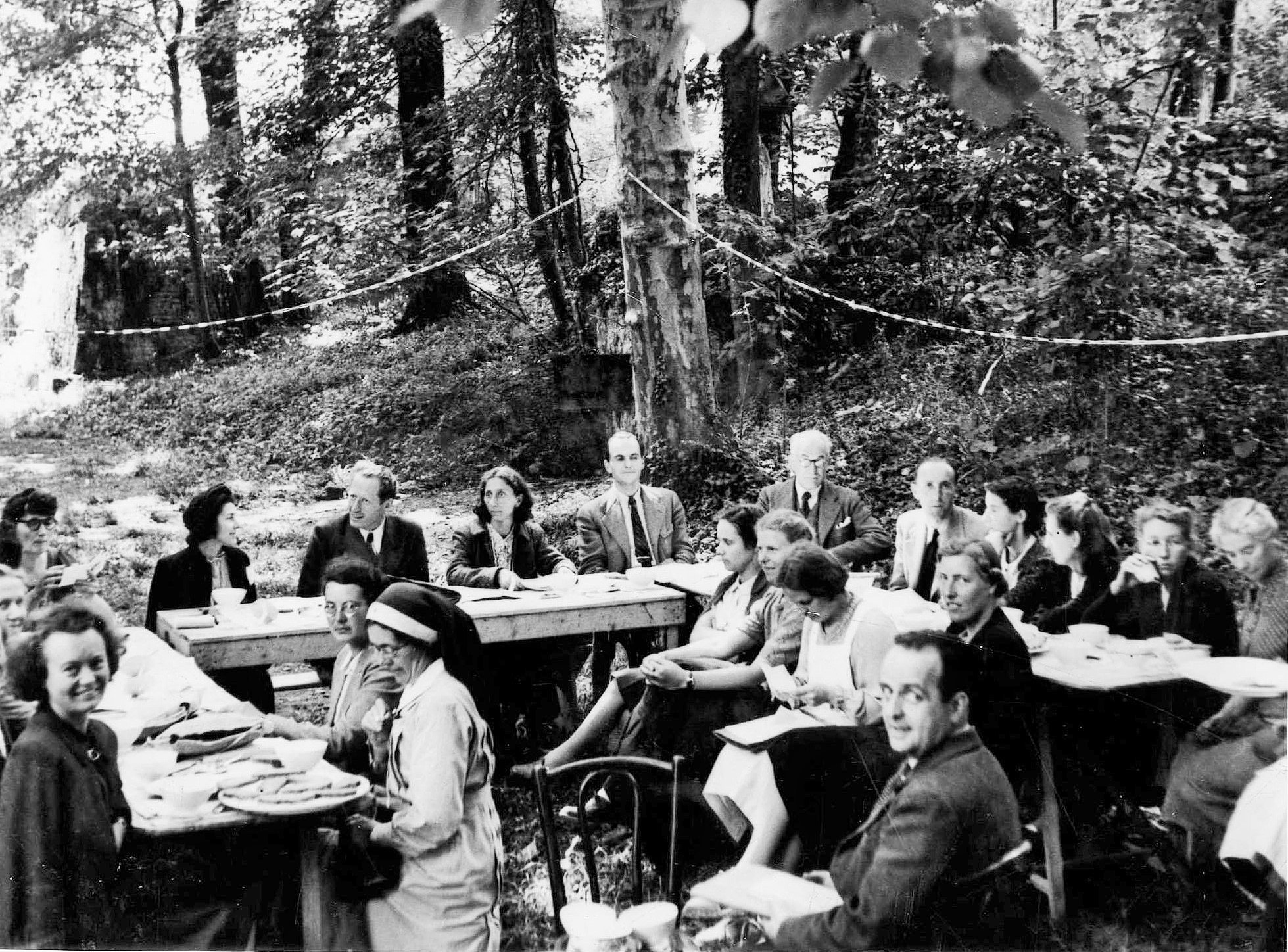
Maurice and Ellenor Dubois (table in the background, 2nd and 3rd from the left), Red Cross staff meeting in Montluel, June 1942

Maurice Dubois (July 17, 1905 – December 6, 1997) was the Swiss delegation leader of the Children's Aid of the Swiss Red Cross in southern France, as well as a delegate of the Swiss donation in France. He was also a righteous among the nations.

== Biography ==
Dubois was the son of Sheen and studied to become a furrier. He was a member of Service Civil International, an international non-governmental organization. Dubois was a Quaker, and in the 1930s he was a conscientious objector and therefore was not drafted into the Swiss army. Between 1937–1939 he was active on behalf of the children who were affected by the Spanish Civil War.

=== During World War II ===
With the outbreak of World War II, Dubois established a Swiss organization to aid children called "Swiss Aid for Children" (Secours Suisse aux Enfants). The organization had a branch in Toulouse. In 1940, this branch in southern France became part of the Swiss Red Cross.

After Kristallnacht, a number of Jewish children were sent by their parents to Belgium in order to ensure their safety. After the German conquest of Belgium in May 1940, these children fled to France. Dubois's aid organization took them under its wing and they were housed in the organization's building. Dubois visited the children regularly, sometimes with his wife, for two years, and assisted them as much as he could.

In August 1942, the roundup and deportation of Jews without French citizenship in the area to concentration and extermination camps began. A number of Jewish children who had taken refuge in the organization's building were arrested and brought to the Vernet camp. In order to free them, Dubois traveled to Vichy and met with Marshal Philippe Pétain and René Bousquet. He threatened to stop Red Cross aid to French children, despite the fact that he did not have the authority to make such a threat and knew the Red Cross would not back him up. In the end, the children were released thanks to his intervention. Dubois's wife, Ellen, tried unsuccessfully to obtain entry permits to Switzerland from the Swiss Red Cross for the children staying at the organization's building. Finally, in defiance of his superiors' instructions and in violation of French law, Dubois smuggled dozens of Jewish children into Switzerland.
