= Andrés W. López =

Puerto Rican lawyer

Andrés López

Personal details
- Born: San Juan, Puerto Rico, U.S.
- Political party: Democratic
- Education: Harvard University (BA, JD)

Andrés W. López (born in Santurce, San Juan, Puerto Rico) is one of six residents of Puerto Rico who serve as members of the Democratic National Committee, having been appointed by DNC Chairman and Virginia Governor Tim Kaine as an at-large member.

A 1992 graduate of Harvard College, he obtained his Juris Doctor at Harvard Law School in 1995, where he was a co-founder of the Harvard Latino Law Review and chaired the Harvard Law School Latino Alumni Committee from 2009 to 2014. He clerked for two United States Judges in two districts, George A. O'Toole, Jr. in Massachusetts and Jay A. García-Gregory in Puerto Rico. Prior to organizing his own law firm in San Juan, Puerto Rico, López worked for the Hill & Barlow law firm in Boston and the Fiddler, González & Rodríguez law firm in San Juan. He serves as a member of the board of the Federal Bar Association Puerto Rico chapter.

An early supporter of a fellow Harvard Law School graduate, Barack Obama, he co-chaired the Illinois U.S. senator's campaign in Puerto Rico's June 1, 2008 presidential primary and served as a delegate from Puerto Rico at that year's Democratic National Convention. On September 11, 2009, he was elected to serve as an at-large member of the DNC, at the organization's fall meeting in Austin, Texas. Later that month, President Obama appointed López to serve as a member of the commission to Study the Potential Creation of a National Museum of the American Latino. On May 5, 2010, López appeared on CNN en Español to discuss the importance of the Cinco de Mayo holiday to all U.S. Latinos. López was one of approximately 100 guests invited to attend President Obama's Super Bowl party at the White House on February 6, 2011.

López is married, lives in San Juan, Puerto Rico, and has three sons.
