= List of companies based in New York City =

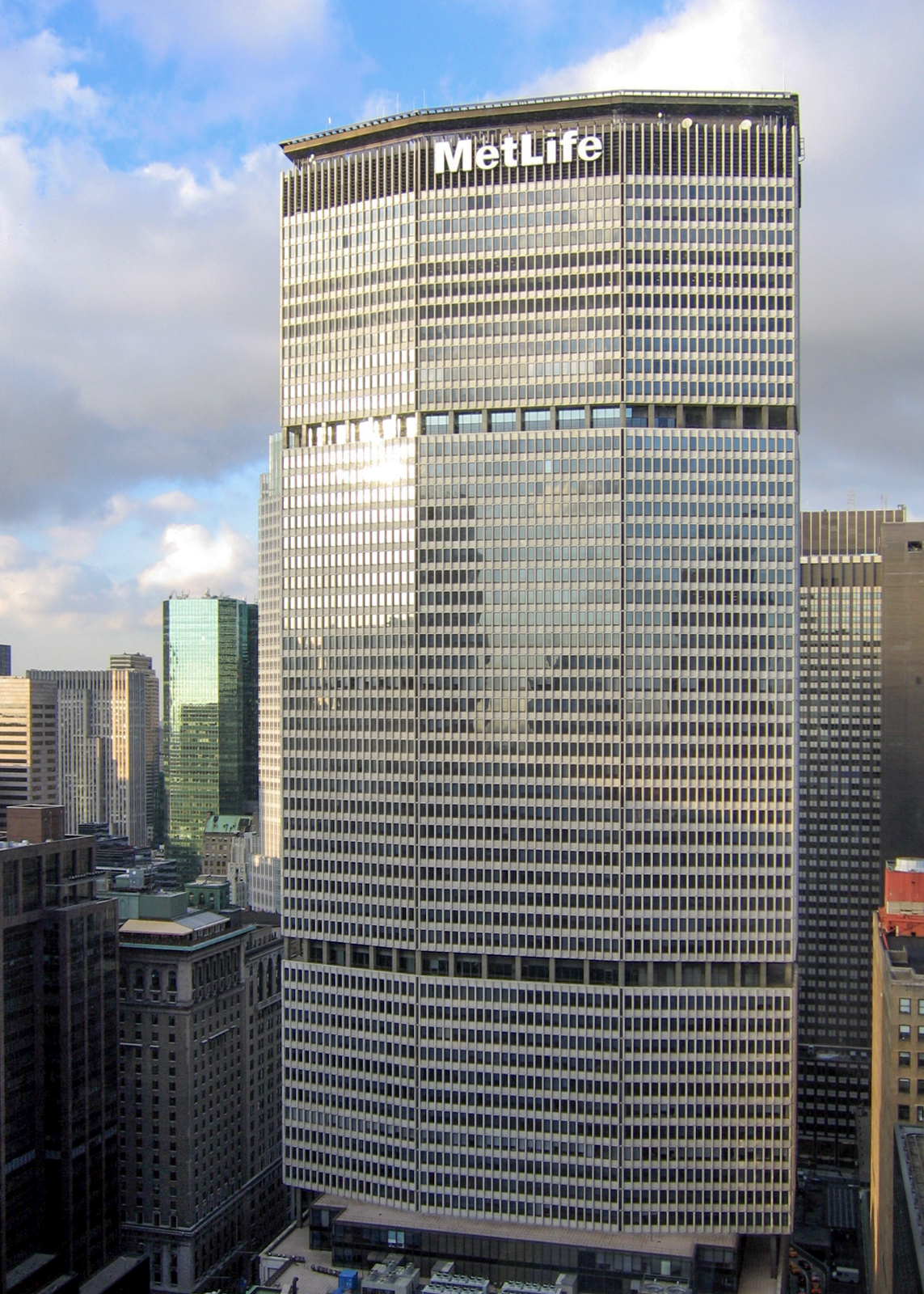
The MetLife Building, formerly the Pan Am Building

This is a list of notable corporations headquartered, current and historically, in New York City, New York. The table is arranged alphabetically by company, but can also be sorted by industry.

Company	Industry
8coupons	coupons
ABC	media
ABM Industries	business services
About.com	media
Advance Publications	media
Aéropostale	fashion
Alcoa	metal mining
Alleghany	insurance
AllianceBernstein	financial services
Alloy	financial services
Ambac Financial Group	insurance
American Express	financial services
American International Group	insurance
American Stock Exchange	financial exchanges
Ann Taylor	fashion
Anna Sui	fashion
Annaly Capital Management	financial services
AOL	Internet
Apollo Management	financial services
Apple Bank	financial services
Associated Press	media
Assurant	insurance
Atari (U.S. subsidiary)	computers
Atlantic Express	transportation
Aventura Technologies	telecommunications
Avon Products	beauty
AXA Equitable Life Insurance Company	insurance
B&H Photo	retail
BofA Securities	financial services
Barclays	Financial Services Company
Barstool Sports	media
The Bank of New York Mellon	financial services
Barnes & Noble	retail
Barneys New York	retail
Bergdorf Goodman	retail
BGC Group	financial services
BlackRock	financial services
Blackstone Group	financial services
Bloomberg	business services
Bloomingdale's	retail
Booker Software, Inc.	business services
Booz & Company	consulting
Bowlero Corporation	bowling
Blue Apron	meal kit
Bristol Myers Squibb	pharmaceuticals
Brooks Brothers	fashion
Brown Brothers Harriman & Co.	financial services
Bulova	fashion
BuzzFeed	entertainment, news
Cadillac	automotive
Cadwalader, Wickersham & Taft	law firms
Calvin Klein	fashion
Cantor Fitzgerald	financial services
CBS	media
CBS Corporation	media
CBS Radio	media
CCMP Capital	financial services
Century 21	retail
Cerberus Capital Management	financial services
Chadbourne & Parke	law firms
CIT Group	financial services
Citigroup	financial services
Clayton, Dubilier & Rice	financial services
Cleary Gottlieb Steen & Hamilton	law firms
Club Monaco	retail
Colgate-Palmolive	consumer goods
Condé Nast	media
Conductor	media
Consolidated Edison	utilities
ContiGroup Companies	agribusiness, food industry
Cosentini Associates	engineering
Coty	beauty
Cowen Group	financial services
Cravath, Swaine & Moore	law firms
Crowe Global	professional services
Cushman & Wakefield	real estate
DailyPay	financial services
DarwinHealth	biomedical
Davis Polk & Wardwell	law firms
Debevoise & Plimpton	law firms
dELiA*s	retail
Deloitte Touche Tohmatsu	accounting
Deutsche Bank	financial services
Dewey & LeBoeuf	law firms
Dime Community Bank	financial services
DKNY	fashion
DormAid	consumer services
DoubleClick	Internet
Dow Jones & Company	media
EmblemHealth	insurance
Emigrant Bank	financial services
eMusic	Internet
EquityZen	financial services
Ernst & Young	accounting
Estée Lauder	beauty
Etsy	Internet
Evercore	financial services
EXL Service	professional services
Fairchild Fashion Media	media
Fairway Market	retail
FAO Schwarz	retail
The Food Emporium	retail
Food Network	media
Foot Locker	retail
Forest Laboratories	pharmaceuticals
Fortress Investment Group	financial services
FreshDirect	retail
Fried, Frank, Harris, Shriver & Jacobson	law firms
flok	AI/chatbots
Fullstack Academy	educational institutions
Gadget Flow	online retail
Genpact	professional services
GLG Partners	financial services
Goldman Sachs	financial services
Granite Broadcasting Corporation	media
Griffon Corporation	conglomerate
Gristedes	retail
The Guardian Life Insurance Company of America	insurance
Hachette Book Group USA	media
HarperCollins	media
HBO	media
Hearst Communications	media
Hearst Television	media
Hess	oil
HSBC Bank USA	financial services
IAC/InterActiveCorp	Internet
Icahn Enterprises	conglomerates
Iconix Brand Group	fashion
ImClone Systems	pharmaceuticals
ImpreMedia	media
Infor	software
Inner City Broadcasting Corporation	media
INTL FCStone	financial services
International Business Times	media
International Flavors & Fragrances	chemicals
International Securities Exchange	financial exchanges
The Interpublic Group of Companies	advertising
J.Crew	fashion
J&R	retail
Jefferies Group	financial services
JetBlue	transportation
JPMorgan Chase	banking & financial services
Kate Spade & Company	fashion
Kaye Scholer	law firms
Keefe, Bruyette & Woods	financial services
Kenneth Cole Productions	fashion
Kensington Books	media
Key Food	retail
Kohlberg Kravis Roberts	financial services
Kohn Pedersen Fox	construction
KPMG	accounting
L-3 Communications	aerospace
Lady M	food industry
Lazard Capital Markets	financial services
Leucadia National	conglomerates
Loehmann's	retail
Loews Corporation	conglomerates
Logicworks	information technology
M&F Worldwide	business services
MacAndrews & Forbes	financial services
Macy's	retail
Major League Baseball	sports leagues (professional)
Makovsky	public relations company
Marc Jacobs	fashion
Marsh McLennan	business services
Martha Stewart Living Omnimedia	media
Marvel Entertainment	media
Max Mara	fashion
Maxim (magazine)	media
McGraw Hill Education	education
McGraw Hill Financial	financial services
McKinsey & Company	consulting
MDC Partners	advertising, public relations, marketing
Melvin Capital	investment management
MetLife	insurance
MF Global	financial services
Michael Kors	fashion
Milbank, Tweed, Hadley & McCloy	law firms
Modell's	retail
Moody's Corporation	business services
Morgan Stanley	financial services
MSCI	financial services
MTV Networks	media
Mutual of America	insurance
Nasdaq	financial exchanges
Nasdaq, Inc.	financial exchanges
National Basketball Association	sports leagues (professional)
National Football League	sports leagues (professional)
National Hockey League	sports leagues (professional)
NBC	media
NBCUniversal	media
Nest Seekers International	real estate
New York & Company	retail
New York Board of Trade	financial exchanges
New York Life	insurance
New York Mercantile Exchange	financial exchanges
New York Private Bank & Trust	financial services
New York Stock Exchange	financial exchanges
The New York Times Company	media
New Young Broadcasting	media
Newmark Grubb Knight Frank	real estate
News Corporation (1980–2013)	media
Nickelodeon	media
Nielsen Holdings	business services
NYSE Euronext	financial exchanges
Omnicom Group	advertising
Oppenheimer Holdings	financial services
Outfront Media	outdoor advertising
Parsons Brinckerhoff	construction
Paul Stuart	fashion
Paul, Weiss, Rifkind, Wharton & Garrison	law firms
Perella Weinberg Partners	financial services
Perkins Eastman	construction
Perseus Books Group	media
Pfizer	pharmaceuticals
Phat Farm	fashion
Philip Morris International	tobacco
Polo Ralph Lauren	fashion
The Princeton Review	education services
Priority Bicycles	bicycles
Prometheus Global Media	media
Proskauer Rose	law firms
PVH	fashion
Rainbow Shops	retail
Random Access Music	music collective
Random House	media
Reader's Digest Association	media
Red Apple Group	oil
Refinitiv	financial technology
Related Companies	real estate
Renco Group	conglomerates
Revlon	beauty
Robert Graham	fashion
Rocawear	fashion
Ro	Pharma
Rockstar Games	computers
RTTS (Real-Time Technology Solutions, Inc.)	software quality testing
Safra National Bank of New York	financial services
Saks Fifth Avenue	retail
Saks Inc.	retail
Sanyo Shokai	men's outerwear
Scholastic	media
Scientific Games Corporation	computers
Sean John	fashion
Schrödinger	software, biotech
Schulte Roth & Zabel	law firms
Shake Shack	restaurants
Shearman & Sterling	law firms
Showtime Networks	media
Shutterstock	stock photography, footage and music
Simon & Schuster	media
Simpson Thacher & Bartlett	law firms
SiriusXM	media
Skadden, Arps, Slate, Meagher & Flom	law firms
SL Green Realty	real estate
Sony Music Entertainment	media
Sotheby's	business services
Spiegel	retail
Steve Madden	fashion
Standard Industries	building materials
StockTouch	market analysis
STV Group	construction
Sullivan & Cromwell	law firms
Take-Two Interactive	computers
Tapestry	fashion
TheStreet.com	Internet
Thomson Reuters	media
Thrillist	media
TIAA	insurance
Tiffany & Co.	retail
Time Inc.	media
Time Warner	media
Tishman Realty & Construction	real estate
Tishman Speyer	real estate
Topps	media
Trammo	chemicals
The Travelers Companies	insurance
Trilantic Capital Partners	financial services
The Trump Organization	real estate
Tumblr	Social Media/Blog
Turner Construction	construction
United Stations Radio Networks	media
Universal Music Group	media
Univision Communications	media
Verizon	telecommunications
ViacomCBS	media
Virgin Media	telecommunications
Vornado Realty Trust	real estate
Voya Financial	banking and insurance
W. W. Norton & Company	media
Warburg Pincus	financial services
Warm Biscuit Bedding Company	consumer goods
Warnaco Group	fashion
Warner Music Group	media
Weight Watchers	personal services
Weil, Gotshal & Manges	law firms
The Weinstein Company	media
Welsh, Carson, Anderson & Stowe	financial services
Wenner Media	media
Westwood One	media
WeWork	commercial real estate
White & Case	law firms
William H. Sadlier, Inc.	media
Willkie Farr & Gallagher	law firms
Wilson Elser Moskowitz Edelman & Dicker	law firms
Zearn	education technology
Ziff Davis	publishing

== See also ==
- List of companies based in New York (state)
- List of tech companies in the New York metropolitan area
