= Aventura =

Aventura may refer to:

- Aventura (band), a bachata music group from the Bronx, New York
- Aventura (TV series), a 1970 Mexican telenovela
- Aventura, Florida, a city on the Florida coast in Miami
  - Aventura Mall, an upscale super-regional shopping mall in Aventura, Florida
  - Aventura station, a Brightline railway station in Aventura, Florida, adjacent to Aventura Mall
- Aero Adventure Aventura, a home-built aircraft design
- Aventura (horse), a racehorse
- Aventura (manga), a manga series by Shin Midorikawa
- Aventuras AD, a Spanish video game producer, active from 1987 to 1992
- Aventura Stakes, a Thoroughbred horse race held in Florida
- Uma Aventura (TV series), a Portuguese TV series, aired from 2000 to 2007
- Aventura Technologies, an American technology company accused of selling Chinese goods to the US government yet claiming they were American goods
- "Aventura" (song), a 2019 song by Lunay, Ozuna and Anuel AA

== See also ==
- Adventure (disambiguation)
- L'Avventura, a movie
- L'Avventura (album), a record
- Fiat Avventura, a car
- Alstom Aventra, a model of passenger train
