= Andrea Catsimatidis =

American politician (born 1990)

Chairwoman of the Manhattan Republican Party
- Incumbent
- Assumed office September 2017
- Preceded by: Adele Malpass

Personal details
- Born: April 17, 1990 (age 36) New York City, U.S.
- Party: Republican
- Spouse: Christopher Nixon Cox (m. 2011; div. 2014)
- Relatives: John Catsimatidis (father); Margo Vondersaar Catsimatidis (mother); John Catsimatidis Jr. (brother)
- Education: New York University (BS)

Andrea Catsimatidis (born April 17, 1990) is an American politician who has been the chairwoman of the Manhattan Republican Party since 2017. A New York native and socialite, she is the daughter of John Catsimatidis.

== Early life and education ==
Catsimatidis was born in New York City and raised on Fifth Avenue in the Upper East Side of Manhattan. She is the daughter of John Catsimatidis and his second wife, Margo Vondersaar, whom he married in October 1988. She has a younger brother; John Catsimatidis Jr. She studied business at New York University, where she chaired the College Republicans. She graduated with a BS in Business Management and double minors in Political Science and Communications.

== Career ==
Catsimatidis is an executive of the Red Apple Group and is a principal of Red Apple Real Estate, Vice President of First Federal Guarantee Insurance Company, and managing director of Gristedes supermarkets. Her father owns all three companies.

== Politics ==
She was elected chairwoman of the Manhattan Republican party in 2017, a position she has held since. In January 2019, she appeared on CNN to discuss the government shutdown. In March 2019, the New York Post's Jon Levine called her a "rising GOP star". After Joe Biden defeated then-President Donald Trump in the 2020 presidential election, Catsimatidis made unsubstantiated claims of election fraud. In November 2020, she said, "Is Joe Biden planning a coup by trying to create his own parallel government?" In February 2021, Catsimatidis tweeted "Corporate America helped rig the election.” Shortly after a mob of Trump supporters stormed the Capitol, Catsimatidis promoted debunked claims that antifa activists were among the rioters; she emphasized that she aimed to ensure all the evidence was considered so that attackers could be brought to justice.

== Personal life ==
In 2011, Catsimatidis married Christopher Nixon Cox, Richard Nixon's grandson, at the Greek Orthodox Archdiocesan Cathedral of the Holy Trinity, "before a church packed with family members and political powerhouses," including Hillary Clinton, Henry Kissinger, Rudolph Giuliani, Charles Schumer, Ray Kelly, and Robert M. Morgenthau. An elaborate black-tie wedding reception for 700 guests was held at the Waldorf-Astoria. Her father said that he spent "in excess of $1 million" on the wedding.

She and Cox divorced in 2014.
