= LaRussell =

American rapper (born 1994)

- La Russell smiles with a microphone at the Golden State Valkyries Championship Parade

Background information
- Also known as: Tota Shakur
- Born: LaRussell Dwayne Thomas; October 6, 1994 (age 32); Vallejo, California, U.S.
- Education: Grand Canyon University
- Genre: West Coast hip-hop
- Occupations: Rapper; entrepreneur
- Years active: 2018–present
- Labels: Good Compenny; Roc Nation
- Website: goodcompenny.co

LaRussell Dwayne Thomas (born October 6, 1994), known mononymously as LaRussell, is an American rapper. Based in Vallejo, California, he is a frequent collaborator of Bay Area musicians; he also hosts concerts at The Pergola, his own venue in his backyard.

== Early life ==
LaRussell Dwayne Thomas was born on October 6, 1994, in Vallejo, California. He started rapping in the second grade. He never struggled in school, but did not want to attend, leading to him eventually ending up at People's Continuation High School. His father was his main inspiration in creating music.

== Career ==
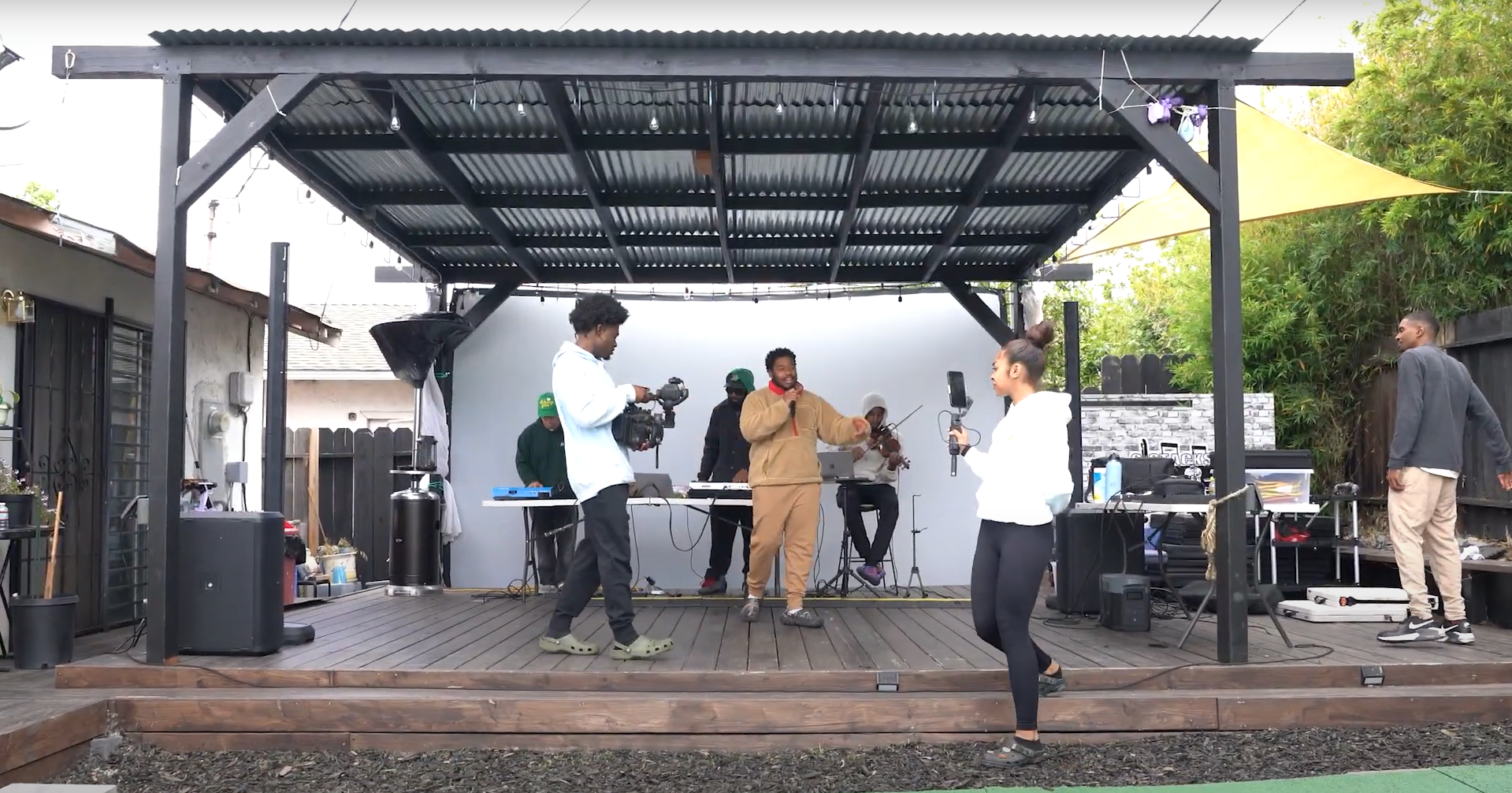
LaRussell practicing at The Pergola in 2023

LaRussell fathered a daughter immediately after leaving high school, so he left his musical endeavors to pursue a more supportive and stable job, eventually obtaining a high-income job in aerospace manufacturing in 2012 after graduating from Grand Canyon University. However, he became demotivated to do his job because he was not able to chase his passion. LaRussell eventually released his first album, The Field Effect, in 2018. After releasing more music, he decided to throw a headlining show at the Empress Theatre to take a risk, and it was successful.

LaRussell began to save money for music, and his father and friends invested their money in him. Eventually, in 2019, he decided to quit his job and start an arts company, Good Compenny, with his friends. He originally went under the name of Tota Shakur, but after releasing Silence Won't Save You in 2020, a more personal album with his life story, he felt that he should represent more of himself in his name.

In 2021, he appeared on The Breakfast Club. He also decided to share parts of his catalog as royalties. In 2025, he performed at the halftime show of the 2025 NBA All-Star Game. In 2026, he performed at the Super Bowl LX Tailgate Party. Days prior to his performance, he signed a record deal with Roc Nation.

In 2026, he released the album Something's in the Water with a goal of selling 100,000 copies in one month. In the first 24 hours, he generated $57,000 from 2,600 contributors, including Kyrie Irving, Snoop Dogg and Cedric the Entertainer. Kyrie Irving's $11,000 purchase set a world record for most spent on a digital album. The album was later bought by the company EarnIn for $20,000. Despite its success, Billboard disqualified the album from appearing on charts due to incentivizing sales.

On March 14, 2026, LaRussell released a video of himself performing the track "Heaven Sent" from his recently released project Father God, Guide Me. Although the material had already been released, the video drew controversy regarding the lyrics of the track—which LaRussell stated his engineer told him he "probably shouldn’t put [...] out"—claiming that figures such as Donald Trump, Jeffrey Epstein, and Adolf Hitler were "heaven sent." In response to the backlash, LaRussell posted on social media accusing critics of the song of misunderstanding its premise, stating "The selective outrage and fake righteousness is a joke" as well as another post clarifying "WE ALL HEAVEN SENT!!! NOT HEAVEN BOUND [sic]." LaRussell later deactivated his social media accounts due to the controversy.

On June 16, 2026, LaRussell appeared on the 21st season of America's Got Talent alongside a backing band, performing the original song "I'm From the Bay" in the audition.

== Personal life ==
LaRussell has two daughters. He is also a vegan and frequently talks about police injustice in his music. He enjoys playing chess, as well as basketball, pickleball, and tennis.

== Influences and artistry ==
LaRussell names Lil Wayne, E-40, Eminem, Mac Dre, and Nipsey Hussle as large inspirations. His top artists are Tupac Shakur, Drake, Jay-Z, André 3000, J. Cole, and Kanye West. LaRussell says that his music is genre-bending and mixes many elements together.

Starting in 2022, after a disgruntling experience with a venue, LaRussell holds many of his performances in his own venue, the Pergola in his home backyard. The stage was designed with assistance from Christian Alberto, a local artist.

In 2026, he appeared on the internet talk show SubwayTakes and claimed Tupac Shakur is the best rapper of all time.

== Philanthropy ==
In 2022, he temporarily bought out the restaurant Momo's Cafe in Vallejo and offered a pay-what-you-want menu for the remainder of the year.

== Discography ==
=== Studio albums ===
- The Field Effect (2018)
- Never Forget Who You Are (2018)
- Love Phi Love (2018)
- The North Star (2019)
- Silence Won't Save You (2020)
- The Field Effect 2 (2020)
- Marlin 7 (2021)
- Cook Together, Eat Together (2021)
- It'll All Make Sense When It's Done (2021)
- I'm About to Fly (with RRAREBEAR) (2021)
- 8Lbs 2Oz (with Armani dePaul) (2021)
- Zaps & Alpines (with Dom Bailey) (2021)
- For What It's Worth (with Hokage Simon) (2022)
- Days Like This (2022)
- Champagne Gummies (2022)
- 96' Bulls (2022)
- I Hate When Life's Going Great (with Deaf Heff) (2022)
- 8 Hours in Brooklyn (2022)
- Omaha (with Hokage Simon) (2023)
- Dragonfly (with Dom Bailey) (2023)
- Clarity (2023)
- How Much Does a Piece of Mind Cost (with Lucas Quinn) (2023)
- Hustlenomics (with Ekzakt and DTB) (2023)
- It's Different (with Hokage Simon) (2023)
- Family Business (with Hokage Simon) (2023)
- Motion (with Link+Up) (2023)
- DJ Gutta Butta Presents: 3 Point Play (with DJ Gutta Busta and Mike G Beatz) (2024)
- Live from the 206 (2024)
- Majorly Independent (with P-Lo) (2024)
- Velour (2024)
- From Vallejo with Love (with Cam Cortez) (2024)
- Rent Paid (with Hit-Boy) (2025)
- Party on the Westside (with Mike & Keys) (2025)
- Be Home Before the Street Lights Come On (2025)
- Black Boy Fly (with Mike & Keys) (2025)
- Make Hip-Hop Fun Again! (with Mike G Beatz) (2025)
- Sobriety (with noizy) (2025)
- Good Ethica (with Ethika Music) (2025)
- Something's in the Water (with Lil Jon) (2026)
- Father God, Guide Me (2026)

=== Extended plays ===
- GCU: 1st Semester (2019)
- GCU: 2nd Semester (2019)
- 26.2 (with Hillz) (2022)
- Rent Due (with Hit-Boy) (2024)
