= Christopher Nixon Cox =

American lawyer (born 1979)

Chris Cox
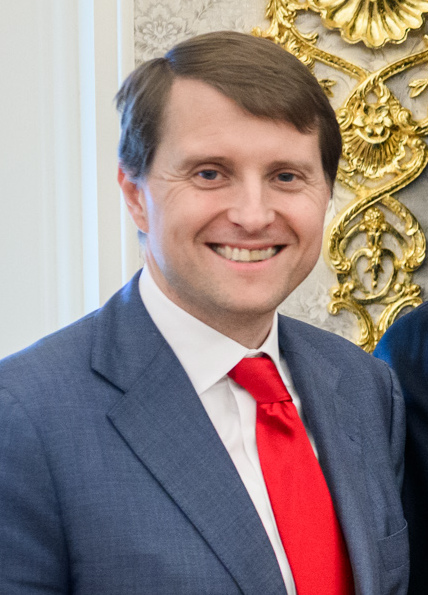
- Cox in 2025
- Born: March 14, 1979 (age 47); New York City, U.S.
- Education: Princeton University (AB); New York University (JD)
- Political party: Republican
- Spouse: Andrea Catsimatidis (m. 2011; div. 2014)
- Parent(s): Edward F. Cox; Tricia Nixon Cox
- Relatives: Julie Nixon Eisenhower (maternal aunt); Richard Nixon (maternal grandfather); Pat Nixon (maternal grandmother); Jennie Eisenhower (maternal cousin)

Christopher Nixon Cox (born March 14, 1979) is an American lawyer based in New York. He is the son of Tricia Nixon Cox and Edward F. Cox, and grandson of President Richard Nixon and First Lady Pat Nixon. Cox is the CEO of Lightswitch Capital, a private equity fund investing in biotech companies.

== Early life and education ==
Christopher Nixon Cox was born on 14 March 1979 at Weill Cornell Medical Center in Lenox Hill, Manhattan, the only child of New York State GOP Chairman Edward F. Cox and Tricia Nixon Cox, older daughter of Richard Nixon, 37th president of the United States from 1969 to 1974.

He graduated from the Buckley School in the City of New York, and magna cum laude from Princeton University with an A.B. in politics. He then went on to receive his J.D. from NYU School of Law and a certificate in finance from the NYU Stern School of Business.

== Career ==
Cox is the CEO of Lightswitch Capital, a private equity fund investing in biotech companies and is a member of the Board of Directors of several privately held companies including Alto Neuroscience.

Cox is on the board of trustees of the American University of Afghanistan and the Board of Trustees of the Command and General Staff College Foundation. Cox is a member of the Board of Directors of the Nixon Foundation and a member of The Nixon Seminar on Conservative Realism and National Security co-chaired by Secretary Michael R. Pompeo and Ambassador Robert C. O'Brien.

Cox is a frequent guest on national and international news programs including Fox News, Newsmax TV, Bloomberg TV, CNBC, ABC News, CNN, BBC, NBC and other news outlets and has published numerous articles including in The Hill, L’Express, Newsmax, Foxnews.com and the South China Morning Post. Cox is also a film industry consultant; most recently, he worked on Nixon's Gamble, directed by Sean McNamara and produced by Steve Paul.

Cox is a non-resident fellow at the Liechtenstein Institute on Self-Determination at Princeton University. He is also a member of the Board of Trustees of the China Institute.

Cox was Senator John McCain's executive director for New York State during the 2008 presidential campaign and is co-founder of the consulting firm, OC Global Partners, LLC.

Previously, Cox was a corporate associate at the law firm of Weil, Gotshal & Manges in their New York office where he worked in the Private Equity Group. Recently, Cox was Vice Chairman of BrightSphere Investment Group.

=== 2010 congressional campaign ===
In 2010, Cox finished third in the Republican primary for New York's 1st congressional district, behind businessman Randy Altschuler and former SEC Enforcement Attorney George Demos. He was endorsed by the Suffolk County 9/12 Project.

On July 21, he was endorsed by former Florida Governor Jeb Bush.

Cox was also endorsed by State Senate Republican Leader Dean Skelos, Suffolk County Conservative Party First Executive Chairman Bill Fries, and State Senator Marty Golden. Cox was also endorsed by several former contestants in the race, including Gary Berntsen and New York State Assemblyman Mike Fitzpatrick (R – Smithtown).

== Personal life ==
On June 4, 2011, Cox married Andrea Catsimatidis, daughter of Gristedes billionaire John Catsimatidis, at the Greek Orthodox Archdiocesan Cathedral of the Holy Trinity on New York's Upper East Side. The couple filed for divorce on December 17, 2014.
