= Current (financial services company) =

American financial technology company

Finco Services, Inc.
- Trade name: Current
- Type: Private
- Industry: Banking, finance
- Founded: 2015; 11 years ago
- Founder: Stuart Sopp
- Headquarters: New York City, United States
- Services: Financial transaction processing Finance and insurance Credit cards Earned wage access
- Website: www.current.com

Finco Services, Inc., branded as Current, is an American financial services and software development company based in New York City. It provides mobile banking services through its partner banks, Choice Financial Group, and Cross River Bank.

The company offers spending accounts, which include early access to paychecks, fee-free overdraft, secured credit building, earned wage access, savings boosts up to 4%, fee-free ATMs, cryptocurrency and redeemable points for cash back. Current’s mobile banking services do not have annual fees, overdraft fees or minimum balance requirements.

Current provides services through its mobile app, and has no physical branches. Account-holders are issued Visa debit cards or credit cards, and have access to an online banking system accessible via the mobile app for Android or iOS.

== History ==
Stuart Sopp and Trevor Marshall founded Current in 2015 in New York City to provide alternative banking services to traditional banks.

Current bases their banking platform on technology called the Current Core. This system lowered the cost of maintaining accounts in comparison to traditional banks built on legacy infrastructure. This allows Current to provide service to customers at a lower cost than traditional banks, and thus eliminate or reduce fees charged to customers.

In 2020, Current added over 100,000 new members each month from April to December, reaching one million accounts by June. By December 2022, Current had over four million accounts.

In 2024, Current was named to CNBC’s ‘The World’s Top 250 Fintech Companies’.

In January 2025, Current became a member of the American Fintech Council.

== Services ==
Current's first product, a debit card for teens controlled by parents, launched in May 2017.

Current launched its personal accounts for adults in February 2019, which featured early access to wages with direct deposit, fee-free overdraft (up to $200), no minimum balance requirements, and instant removals of gas holds that stations put on debit cards.

In 2020, Current became the first U.S. based consumer fintech to launch a points reward system based on debit, which allows its members to earn points redeemable for cash back in their Current accounts.

In September 2020, Current launched an add cash feature through its partnership with InComm, giving its members the ability to add cash to their Current accounts at over 60,000 stores nationwide that is then instantly available in their Current accounts.

In January 2022, Current launched a 4% APY savings product.

In October 2022, Current launched crypto trading without fees in partnership with Zero Hash, giving its over four million members access to buy and sell dozens of coins on its platform without paying trading fees and with instant liquidity from trades.

Also in October 2022, Current announced it was now doing its own processing directly with Visa.

In August 2023, Current launched a secured credit building card in partnership with Cross River Bank. Current members can build their credit histories through a single spending balance on Current’s platform. The secured charge card connects to a members’ available spending balance.

In early 2024, Current launched Paycheck Advance, its earned wage access product, allowing members to access up to $750 of an upcoming paycheck in advance without any mandatory fees or credit checks. Earned wage access services allow workers to access wages they have already earned before their scheduled payday.

== Operations ==
=== Business model ===
Current has no physical branch locations and does not charge overdraft fees or have a minimum balance requirement. Account holders are issued Visa debit or credit cards and have access to Current's online banking system via its mobile app for iOS or Android.

Current has a spend-based business model, earning revenue from interchange. Current Accounts have no monthly account fees.

In March 2025, Current announced the release of a new case study from Datos Insights titled ‘Foregoing BaaS: How Owning the Core Fuels Current’s Success,’ which concluded Current’s choice to build and not buy the core banking platform has been a defining factor in the company’s growth and success.

=== Patents ===
On December 12, 2019, the company applied for patent 16424341 / 20190378121, "Cryptographic Technology Platform And Methods For Providers To Enable Users To Monetize Their Data" that would cryptographically give end-users, i.e., customers, an option to maintain complete personal data privacy or opt to monetize all or part of it.

=== FDIC Insurance ===
Current accounts are insured up to the standard maximum deposit insurance amount of $250,000 through its bank partners, Choice Financial, Member FDIC and/or Cross River Bank, Member FDIC.

Current announced it had no plans at the present time to pursue its own bank charter in October 2020.

== Response to the COVID-19 pandemic ==
In April 2020, Current was the first neobank to receive government stimulus payments for its customers under the CARES Act, and used its own balance sheet to credit all member accounts immediately, which was five days faster than most incumbent banks.

A few days later, Current announced most of the stimulus funds were being used on food, groceries, gas and day-to-day living costs. Over 45 percent of the first funds were spent within five days.

In December 2020, Current was again the first neobank to credit government stimulus payments, receiving and crediting the funds just hours after the Treasury Secretary announced their distribution, using its own balance sheet to credit the funds for all member accounts immediately.

In March 2021, Current again credited all government stimulus payments five days faster than traditional banks, using its own balance sheet to credit funds for all member accounts immediately.

== See also ==
- Financial technology
- Payment card industry
- Online banking
