= On-demand pay =

Financial service

On-demand pay, sometimes referred to as Earned Wage Access, early wage access, or instant pay, is a financial service that allows workers to access earned or anticipated wages before their scheduled payday. The service is offered through a variety of models, including employer-integrated platforms and direct-to-consumer financial applications.

== On-Demand Pay Models ==
=== Earned Wage Access (EWA) ===
Earned Wage Access (EWA) refers to employer-integrated programs that allow employees to access a portion of wages they have already accrued during a pay period, before the scheduled payday. Because the funds are drawn against wages already earned, providers and employers often distinguish EWA from traditional lending products.

In employer-integrated EWA models, the provider establishes a direct relationship with the employer or their payroll system. This integration allows the platform to verify hours worked and wages accrued in real time, reducing the financial risk associated with advances.

Payactiv, widely credited as the pioneer of the modern EWA model, launched its employer-integrated platform in 2012. The company partners directly with employers to offer workers on-demand access to earned wages, typically through a mobile application. Payactiv charges fees to employers rather than employees in some arrangements, and in 2022 received a formal compliance letter from the Consumer Financial Protection Bureau (CFPB) indicating that its specific fee-based EWA model does not constitute credit under the Truth in Lending Act, though that letter was later rescinded amid broader regulatory debate over the classification of EWA products.

=== Direct-to-Consumer ===
Direct-to-consumer (DTC) on-demand pay models offer workers access to funds ahead of payday without requiring an employer partnership. Rather than verifying wages through a direct payroll integration, these platforms estimate or infer a user's earned income through bank account analysis, deposit history, or other indirect data signals.

Direct-to-consumer models are more accessible to workers whose employers do not participate in an EWA program, though the absence of a direct payroll link introduces greater uncertainty around income verification. Regulatory agencies, including the CFPB and, have debated whether DTC products that charge fees or solicit tips in exchange for faster access to funds constitute credit products subject to lending disclosures.

=== Regulation and Criticisms ===
The regulatory status of on-demand pay products in the United States remains unsettled. Several states, including California, Nevada, and Missouri, have enacted laws specifically addressing EWA, though the definitions and requirements vary. At the federal level, the CFPB has issued guidance and proposed rules that would treat certain on-demand pay products as credit, which would subject them to the Truth in Lending Act and require disclosure of annual percentage rates (APR).

Industry groups have advocated for a regulatory framework that distinguishes employer-integrated EWA from consumer lending products, arguing that accessing already-earned wages does not carry the same risks as taking on debt.

Critics have raised concerns about the potential for repeat use to create a cycle of wage dependency, particularly for lower-income workers.

== History ==
Modern on-demand pay in the United States began in 2012, but the concept has a long history and its usage varies by location and economic conditions.

=== Biblical references ===
Several religious texts discuss paying workers before the end of the day or in a very timely manner. For example, the Jewish, Christian, and Muslim faiths share this line from the biblical book of Deuteronomy (Chapter 24, Verse 15): "You shall give him his wage on his day and not let the sun set over it."

Leviticus (Chapter 19, Verse 12), states: "The wages of a laborer shall not remain with you until morning."

=== See Also ===
- Earned Wage Access
- Payroll
- Consumer Financial Protection Bureau
- Financial technology
