= Booker Software =

Software company headquartered in New York City

Booker Software, Inc.
- Type: Subsidiary
- Industry: Software-as-a-Service
- Founded: 2007; 19 years ago
- Defunct: 2018
- Fate: Acquired
- Headquarters: Brooklyn, New York, New York, United States
- Key people: Fritz Lanman (CEO)
- Products: Service Management Platform
- Services: Cloud-based business management
- Number of employees: 270+
- Parent: Playlist
- Website: www.mindbodyonline.com/business/booker

Booker Software is an American software company headquartered in New York City. Its products are cloud-based management and booking systems for spas and salon stores. In 2018, the company was acquired by Mindbody.

== History ==
Booker was started in 2007 by Peter Ellis and Daniel Lizio-Katzen as SpaBooker, a division of SpaFinder. SpaBooker was its initial software product.

In October 2010, SpaBooker spun off to a separate company called GramercyOne. During this time, the company continued to add features to the SpaBooker platform and market it to other appointment-based service businesses such as hotels, medical practices, dance studios, and repair shops.

In October 2011, Booker (then GramercyOne) secured $14.5 million in funding from Revolution Ventures, Grotech Ventures, TDF, and Jubilee.

In November 2012, GramercyOne changed its name to Booker Software, Inc. As of March 2015, Booker has over 270 employees and is under the leadership of CEO Josh McCarter. In February 2017, Booker expanded its new 10,000-square-foot office at SkySong.

By 2013, Booker had 9,000 business clients in 73 countries. Notable clients include Hilton Hotels, Hard Rock Café, and DryBar.

In November 2012, Booker reported triple-digit revenue growth for the fourth consecutive year. By 2013, Booker was processing $4.5 million in daily transactions and 2 million monthly appointment bookings on its platform. The company grew from 30 employees to 160+ employees between 2010 and 2012.

On April 16, 2013, Booker secured $27.5 million in Series B financing led by Bain Capital Ventures. Booker's Series A investors, Revolution Ventures, Grotech Ventures, TDF Ventures, and Vital Financial, also participated in the financing round.

In March 2018, Booker was acquired by Mindbody Inc., another leading cloud based business management software for the wellness service industry, for $150 million.

In June 2025, Playlist was created, uniting Booker with Mindbody and ClassPass under a single, unified identity.

== Products ==
Booker software is designed to help service businesses manage their operations and marketing. The platform is cloud-based, allowing users to access their accounts through Booker’s desktop, iPhone, iPad, and Android applications. Booker is currently at Version 8.5.

Booker’s software is sold under general and industry-specific names, such as Booker, BookerEnterprise, SpaBooker, and SalonBooker. Features including online booking, employee and room scheduling, social media marketing, specials/deal distribution, payment processing, wait list management, and customer database/management.

Additionally, the software integrates with business’ social media profiles, including those on Facebook, Twitter, and Foursquare. A Booker account includes access to scheduling and gift certificate applications for Facebook.

Booker software has been compared to OpenTable, an online reservation system used by restaurants.

== Products ==
SpaBooker and SalonBooker are marketed and packaged for independent spas and salons.

== Partnerships ==
Booker partners with Allure magazine's Virtual Store, Lifebooker, SpaFinder,

== See also ==
- List of companies based in New York City
