= John Catsimatidis Jr. =

American businessman

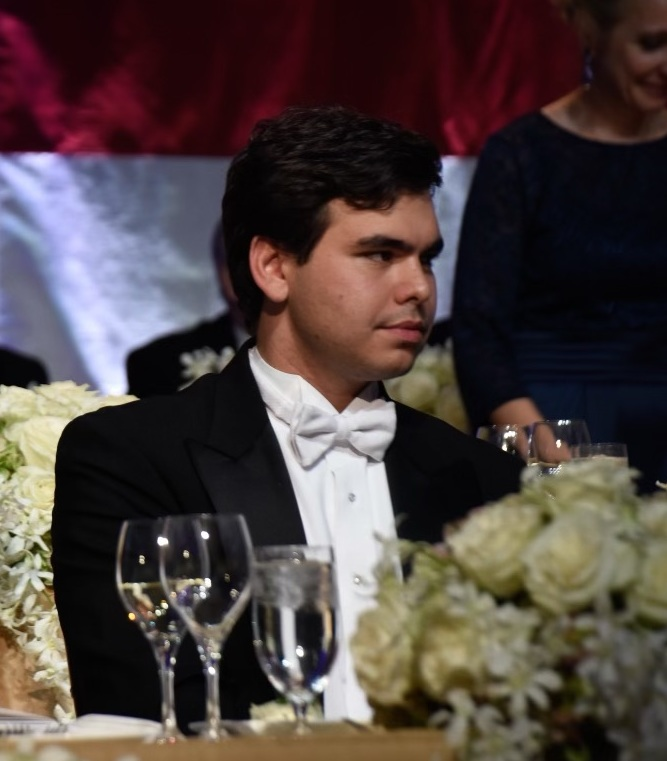
- Catsimatidis in 2018

Personal details
- Party: Republican
- Relatives: John Catsimatidis (father); Andrea Catsimatidis (sister)
- Occupation: Businessman

John A. Catsimatidis Jr. is an American businessman who is the president and chief operating officer of Red Apple Group; a $7 billion conglomerate with operations in energy, supermarkets, media, real estate, and investments. He was formerly executive vice president and chief investment officer. Red Apple Group was founded by his father, John A. Catsimatidis.

== Early life and education ==
Catsimatidis attended New York University, majoring in finance and management and graduated in 2015. While attending, Catsimatidis was the president of his university's College Republicans chapter. From February 2014 to April 2016, he was the chairman of the New York Federation of College Republicans. As chairman, he was noted for civilly disagreeing with his father about the 2014 New York gubernatorial election, with his father hosting 'Republicans for Cuomo' events, while he said that "it is my duty to help grow the Republican party," supporting Rob Astorino.

== Career ==
Catsimatidis was the youngest delegate from New York to attend the 2016 Republican National Convention. At 24, Gold Coast Bank named him a board member.

When asked about a future run for political office, Catsimatidis said “I’ll never run for office just to run. Only if I can truly add value to the system, I’ll definitely run.”

He now serves as president and chief operating officer of Red Apple Group.

== Personal life ==
In October 2024, Catsimatidis married Meghan Fitzpatrick in a Greek-American ceremony at NYC's Archdiocesan Cathedral of the Holy Trinity.
