= United Refining Company =

American oil company

- Type: Private
- Industry: Oil and natural gas, convenience stores
- Founded: 1902; 124 years ago
- Headquarters: Warren, Pennsylvania, United States
- Area served: Ohio, Pennsylvania, and New York
- Key people: John Catsimatidis (CEO); James E. Murphy (CFO); Myron L. Turfitt (COO)
- Products: Petroleum and derived products
- Owner: Red Apple Group
- Subsidiaries: Kwik Fill; Country Fair, Inc.
- Website: www.urc.com

The United Refining Company (URC) is an American oil company in Warren, Pennsylvania. The company operates an oil refinery in Warren that can process 70,000 barrels of crude oil into gasoline, diesel fuel and other petroleum distillates per day. It distributes gasoline under the Kwik Fill and Keystone brands. In early 2019, the American Automobile Association noted that Warren had the most expensive gasoline in Western Pennsylvania, despite the presence of the refinery in the town and a gasoline station just outside the refinery, the root cause of which remains undetermined.

== History ==
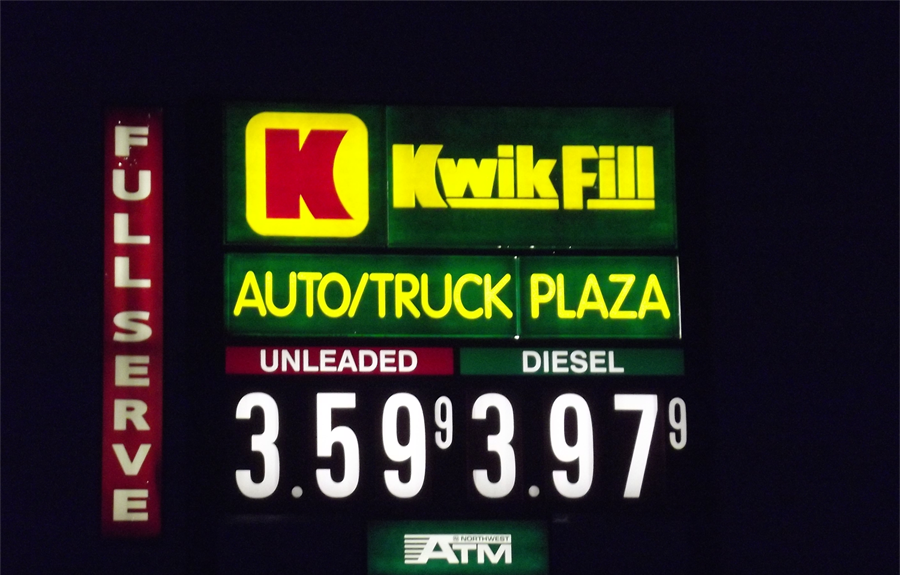
Kwik Fill sign, January 2013

The United Refining Company was founded in 1902 by Harry Logan, Sr. His son, Harry Logan, Jr., succeeded his father as president and chairman of United Refining in 1957. In 1986, John Catsimatidis acquired United Refining as a subsidiary of his Red Apple Group.

As of 1935, the company had a pair of marketing subsidiaries, Emblem Oil Company and Red Star Lubrication Service Incorporated, which distributed Keystone Gasoline and Emblem Motor Oils, respectively.

The refinery was expanded from 60,000 barrels per day (9,500 m^{3}/d) to 65,000 barrels per day (10,300 m^{3}/d) in 1982. It was expanded again to have a processing capacity of 70,000 barrels per day (11,000 m^{3}/d) in 2007. The employees of the Warren refinery are represented by the International Union of Operating Engineers.

== Citgo ==
URC acquired the rights to use the name Citgo in 2002 when it bought a local gas station and convenience store chain called Country Fair, Inc. in Erie, Pennsylvania which included a license agreement to use "Citgo's brands, trademarks and other forms of identification."

After Venezuelan President Hugo Chávez's speech to the United Nations, there were calls to boycott the Citgo brand. In response, URC began phasing out that brandname, and has been emphasizing that its crude oil supply comes from North America. URC also continued rebranding its product under the Kwik Fill and other local names.

== Convenience stores ==
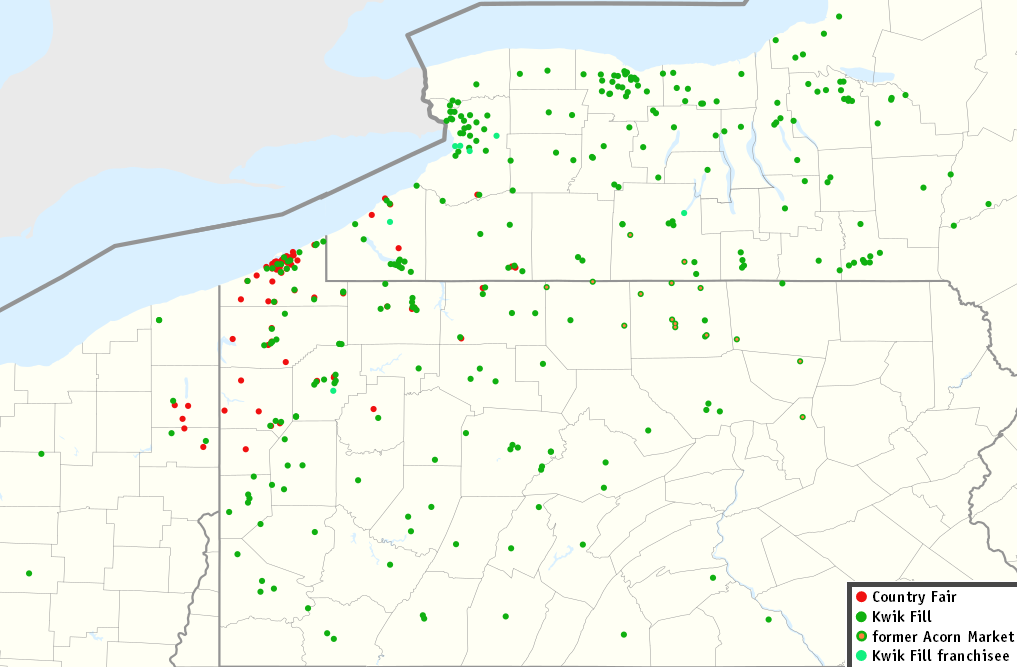
Map of Country Fair & Kwik Fill/Red Apple locations as of February 2021.

United Refining Company distributes its oil through its owned-and-operated convenience stores, totaling approximately 375 across upstate New York, Pennsylvania, and Northeast Ohio. The stores operate under the names Kwik Fill, Red Apple, or Country Fair. Many Kwik Fill locations are full-service, meaning they pump gas for customers.
