= 8coupons =

Mobile coupon website

8Coupons
- Company type: Private
- Founded: 2007
- Headquarters: New York City, {{{location_country}}}
- Key people: Co-founders Landy Ung and Wan Hsi Yuan
- Industry: Mobile coupons
- Website: www.8coupons.com

8coupons is a New York-based deal aggregator website that distributes deal updates and digital coupons to consumers based on weekly deals, customized online feeds, or the user's current location.

Originally the website focused on the local New York City metropolitan area, until 2009 when the company announced a series of content partnerships and new features for user-submitted deals that armed the website with 200,000 coupons across the country. Content partners include Valpak and Money Mailer and local bloggers across the country. In Feb, 2010, the company also began to aggregate from collective buying websites including Groupon, LivingSocial, Plum district, Adility Deal, Town Hog, Half Off Depot and others.

8coupon's syndicated promotions can be redeemed on the sites of their affiliate partners or at the merchant using a cell phone.

The company is themed with the number eight. 8coupons celebrates their anniversary on the 8th day of the 8th month, they have lists of the top eight deals, and their "OCHO LOCO" deals are all themed with the number eight. For example, the website has had 88 cent whiskey drinks, eight-cent falafels, and 88 cent burgers on the eighth day of every month.

== History ==
8coupons was founded by Landy Ung and her boyfriend Wan Hsi Yuan in August 2007.

The company was founded with $30,000 from Landy Ung's mother's fried chicken restaurant and initially relied on word of mouth to generate interest in the website. In 2007 and 2008, the company was run from the couple's 500-square-foot (46 m^{2}) studio apartment.

Within a year of the website's August 2007 launch, it had 60,000 unique visitors a month and by late 2008 their traffic was growing 50-100 percent a month. By that time, the founders had quit their full-time jobs to work on 8coupons.com, which charges a monthly fee of $265 to merchants who use the service to promote special offers.

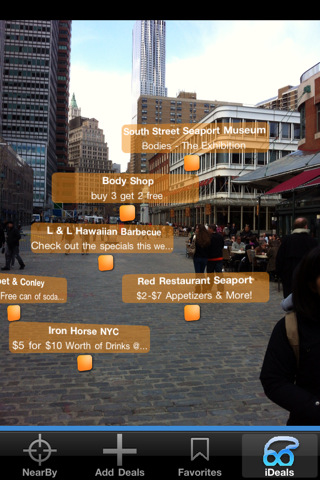
8coupons' augmented reality view on the iPhone app

By January 2009, 8coupons.com's traffic was growing 25 percent a week and as of late 2009, the company had 415,000 unique visitors a month. By the end of 2009, the company had 770,000 unique visitors a month and had grown 869 percent that year alone. The company attributes their growth – at least partially – to a weak economy bringing greater demand for special deals. This was also when the company expanded the coupons on the website from Manhattan, to the all across the United States. In early 2010, TechCrunch reported 8coupons had reached over one million unique visitors a month. In 2011 8coupons developed an iPhone app with an augmented reality view and relaunched the website with new filtering and personalization features.

== Items and services ==
Users can receive alerts regarding nearby deals based on the categories they select or switch to an augmented reality view on an iPhone that overlays a brief description of the offer and its relative location to the user. Registered users can view deals/coupons and opt to receive coupon alerts via text message from merchants in categories they select or based on deals near their current location. Coupons are transmitted to users based on their preferences set on the website or mobile app and are redeemable at the merchant by showing them the coupon message on the phone. Coupons include local restaurants, retail, entertainment, and beauty & spa among others.

The website has a database of coupons and sales that are generated through affiliate relationships, sponsored posts from companies looking to promote their deals, and from user submissions. As of early 2010, the website included approximately 100,000 user submitted deals, 50,000 coupons from content partners, and at least 20,000 from 8coupons.com small business customers. In early 2010 the website had 150,000 users, and by 2011 it had 2.5 million monthly unique visitors.
