= DailyPay =

American financial services company

DailyPay Inc.
- Type: Private
- Industry: Financial technology; Financial services; Technology
- Founded: 2015; 11 years ago
- Founders: Jason Lee; Rob Law
- Headquarters: New York, NY, U.S.A.
- Key people: Nelson Chai (CEO)
- Services: On-Demand Pay; Earned Wage Access
- Number of employees: 800 (2020)
- Website: www.dailypay.com

DailyPay is an American technology company founded in 2015, which provides payroll services such as on-demand pay.

== History ==
DailyPay was founded in 2015. The company allows other organizations and payroll providers to offer earned wage access to employees, giving workers wages they have already earned before their scheduled payday. The service is often used by companies with low-wage employees, who work paycheck-to-paycheck, as an alternative to loans.

Employees who use the service are charged no fee to arrange a wage or partial wage withdrawal early. Daily Pay also offers a pre-paid Visa debit card which has no fees and offers all wages, if a user has their direct deposits sent to Daily Pay. The company has developed machine learning systems to process large volumes of payroll data, support real-time wage access, and detect potentially fraudulent transactions.

In September 2016, the company raised $5 million in financing during its Series A Round. In February 2018, the company raised $9 million in Series B funding.

In 2018, human resources company ADP announced that it would be offering early wage access to its clients through DailyPay.

As of 2020, the company had roughly 500,000 active users, and had partnered with companies such as Burger King, Uber, DoorDash and Shiftgig.

In 2021, the company received an honorable mention on Fast Company's "World Changing Ideas Awards".

== Lawsuits ==
On April 14, 2025, New York's Attorney General, Letitia James, filed a lawsuit against DailyPay, accusing the company of engaging in predatory payday lending practices. Specifically, the lawsuit alleges that DailyPay violates New York's usury laws and wage assignment laws by charging excessive fees for accessing pay, resulting in effective interest rates that can exceed 750%.
