= John Catsimatidis =

American magnate and political figure (born 1948)

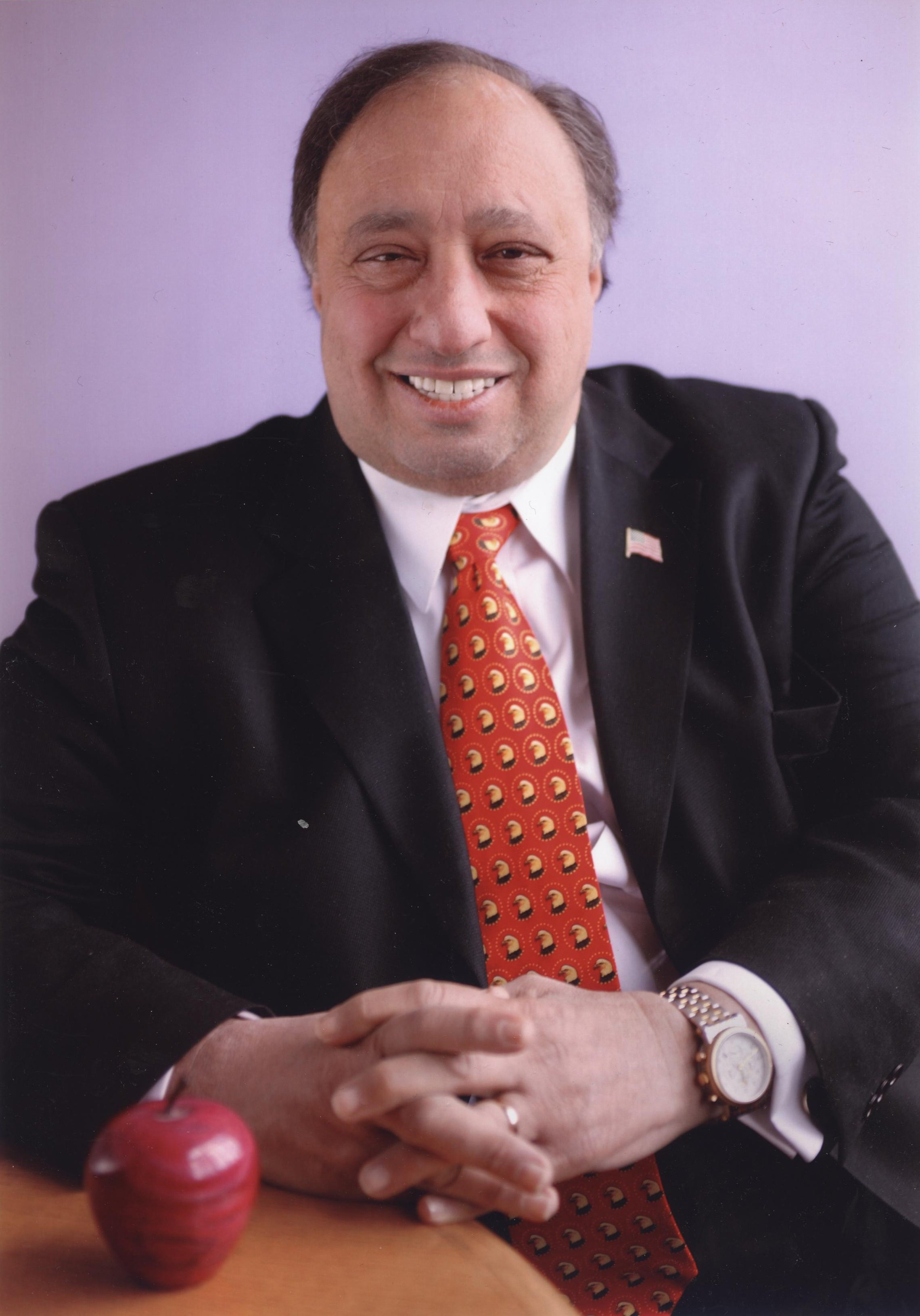
- Catsimatidis in 2011
- Born: September 7, 1948 (age 78); Nisyros, Greece
- Education: New York University
- Political party: Democratic (before 2009); Republican (2009–present)
- Spouses: First wife (divorced); Margo Vondersaar (m. 1988)
- Children: Andrea; John

John A. Catsimatidis (/ˌkætsɪməˈtiːdiːz/ KAT-sih-mə-TEE-deez; born September 7, 1948) is an American billionaire businessman, radio talk show host, and actor. He is the owner, president, chairman, and CEO of grocery chains Gristedes and D'Agostino Supermarkets in Manhattan, as well as the Red Apple Group, a real estate and aviation company with about $2 billion in holdings in New York, Florida and Pennsylvania. He is also the chairman and CEO of the Red Apple Group subsidiary United Refining Company.

Catsimatidis hosts two talk radio shows, The Cats Roundtable on WABC and the Cats at Night show. He initiated purchase talks for the WABC radio station in 2019 which, after regulatory delays, was concluded in March 2020.

Catsimatidis was the runner-up in the Republican nomination for mayor of New York City in the 2013 election.

== Early life ==
Catsimatidis was born on the Greek island of Nisyros on September 7, 1948. He came to the United States with his parents when he was six months old. The family moved to West Harlem, where Catsimatidis grew up. Catsimatidis's father had been a lighthouse operator in Greece but worked as a busboy in New York. Catsimatidis graduated from Brooklyn Technical High School in 1966. He received a congressional nomination to West Point, but chose to study electrical engineering at New York University instead.

While in college, Catsimatidis worked for the uncle of a friend, Tony, in a small supermarket on 137th Street which Tony and his uncle owned. While Catsimatidis was still in college, Tony sold his half of the store to Catsimatidis. Catsimatidis completed four years of college, but dropped out eight credits short of graduating.

== Business career ==
In 1971, Catsimatidis opened his first business in Manhattan's Upper West Side; it was the first Red Apple grocery store. Shortly thereafter, he purchased another grocery store on 87th street just west of Broadway, naming it Red Apple. Among his business innovations were keeping stores open late seven days a week, offering free delivery, and cashing checks for customers.

Catsimatidis has said that by the time he was 24, he had "built up ten stores and the business was doing $25 million a year", and that he was earning $1 million per year. By the summer of 1981, Red Apple had 27 stores in the Bronx and Manhattan, with annual sales of around $40 million. Red Apple's sales grew to $110 million in 1985.

In 1984, Catsimatidis made an investment in Capitol Air, a former charter airline that went out of business later that year. In 1992, Catsimatidis started a charter carrier, Capitol Air Express, that operated from 1993 to 1996 using the same livery as the defunct Capitol Air.

In 1986, Red Apple purchased 36 Gristedes supermarkets and 11 affiliated Charles & Co. speciality-food stores from the Southland Corporation. In 2009, it was reported that Catsimatidis's main holdings included 50 Gristedes supermarkets, 371 gas stations in three states, $500 million in real estate, and an expanding oil business.

In 1986, Catsimatidis acquired United Refining Co., the owner of gasoline refineries in Pennsylvania and Alabama. In October 2009, Forbes magazine reported that United Refining Energy Corp., a publicly traded special-purpose acquisition company sponsored by United Refining Company, was purchasing "privately held Chaparral Energy in a deal worth roughly $1.6 billion." However, United Refining Energy Corp. shareholders did not approve the deal and it was terminated in December 2009. Catsimatidis is the chairman and CEO of United Refining Co., which is a subsidiary of the Red Apple Group.

In 2008, Catsimatidis became engaged in efforts to take over SemGroup LP, a bankrupt oil, gas, and asphalt trading, storage and transportation company, headquartered in Tulsa, Oklahoma. Catsimatidis gained control over a majority of the company's management committee, but his efforts were met by opposition from the company's existing management, who argued for selling off at least some of the company's assets, while Catsimatidis wanted to keep the company together. In February 2009, Catsimatidis was sued by a group of SemGroup executives, who sought the removal of Catsimatidis and his allies from the committee. In July Catsimatidis reached a settlement with SemGroup, pursuant to which he acquired a piece of SemGroup's asphalt business and dropped his competing plan for the company's proposed reorganization.

In 2015, the Red Apple Group ranked 156th on Forbes magazine's list of "America's largest private companies", with revenue of $3 billion and 8,000 employees. (This compares to its 2008 and 2009 rank, both at 100th, 2010 at 78th, 2011 at 98th, and 2012 at 97th).

Catsimatidis was, until the early 2020s, a minority investor in the political newspaper and website The Hill as referenced on the website's articles which had mentioned him.

Catsimatidis shared his rags-to-riches story in his memoir How Far Do You Want to Go?: Lessons from a Common-Sense Billionaire, published by Matt Holt in February 2023.

== Radio ==
On Sunday mornings, Catsimatidis hosts the talk radio show The Cats Roundtable. The show originates on WABC radio (which is not associated with the Disney owned American Broadcasting Company) and is syndicated to other stations around the U.S. Catsimatidis also hosts the one-hour Cats at Night show, heard weeknights on WABC and also available as a podcast. In 2019, he announced an agreement to purchase WABC for $12.5 million, which, after regulatory delays, was finalized in March 2020. Catsimatidis's Red Apple Media has since purchased other radio stations in the region, including WRCR and WLIR. With the shutdown of CBS Radio Network in May 2026, RAG took the opportunity to initiate its alternative "World Wide News Network".

== Political activities before mayoral campaigns ==
Catsimatidis and his wife have made contributions to a variety of both Republican and Democratic campaigns. Among Republicans, the Catsimatidises contributed over $60,000 to the Republican National Committee, and have also made significant contributions to the National Republican Congressional Committee, National Republican Senatorial Committee, Mitt Romney, Eric Cantor, Olympia Snowe, Richard Lugar, and others. Among Democrats handful of Democratic campaigns, including to Carolyn B. Maloney, Charlie Rangel, and Jerrold Nadler. In local New York City races, Catsimatidis has given to Bill de Blasio (while he was a city councilman), Brooklyn Borough President Marty Markowitz, Cyrus Vance Jr., and Staten Island borough president James Molinaro. In the 1992 Democratic presidential primaries, Catsimatidis contributed $150,000 to the campaign of fellow Greek-American Paul Tsongas.

Catsimatidis put on a fundraiser in 2006 with Michael Bloomberg for Senator Joe Lieberman of Connecticut to support his third party run as an independent after Lieberman lost the Democratic primary nomination for reelection to the Senate.

Catsimatidis has been described as a "longtime", "loyal", and "high-level Clinton donor". Catsimatidis donated a significant sum to the Clinton Presidential Center, thought to be between $100,000 and $500,000. Catsimatidis was a member of Hillary Clinton's finance team during her 2008 campaign for the Democratic presidential nomination, saying in February 2007 of Clinton, "She's unstoppable. She's got such a machine." Catsimatidis hosted a number of fundraising dinners with Bill Clinton at his home in New York that in total raised well in excess of $750,000 for Hillary Clinton's campaign. Catsimatidis has said that he is friends with Bill Clinton and that the former president "often" has flown in one of Catsimatidis's two airplanes. Hillary Clinton attended Catsimatidis's daughter's wedding.

In 2015, press reports indicated that Catsimatidis donated the use of a chartered jet valued at $70,000 to the Republican primary campaign of Scott Walker.

== Politics ==
=== 2009 mayoral campaign ===
A donor to Bill Clinton during the Clinton years, Catsimatidis, while still enrolled as a Democrat, considered becoming a candidate in the 2009 mayoral election as a Republican. In May 2007, he was reported to be "systematically wooing local Republicans", attending various Republican fundraisers in Queens and Staten Island and stating that he would "probably have a press conference" to announce his intentions "sooner rather than later" and would consider spending between $30 million and $40 million if he ran.

In 2008, Catsimatidis was viewed as a potential mayoral candidate. By July 2008, Catsimatidis formed an exploratory committee. In 2009, Catsimatidis spent nearly $300,000, much of it on polls and consultants, to explore a candidacy. He said he only agreed to drop out after Bloomberg informed him of his plans to seek a third term. Once the city term limits law was changed to allow Bloomberg to run for a third term, Catsimatidis quietly withdrew.

=== 2013 mayoral campaign ===
During the spring of 2012, Catsimatidis described his dismay over the quality of the announced as well as the presumed candidates. He suggested that he would support New York City Police Commissioner Raymond Kelly, but when Kelly repeatedly denied any intention to run, Catsimatidis expressed his own interest.

In December 2012, Catsimatidis established an exploratory committee to consider running for mayor. On January 3, 2013, he filed paperwork with the New York City Campaign Finance Board .

Catsimatidis made his official announcement on January 29, 2013, vowing to be "a leader for Harlem and Wall Street." He stated "I'm not a Mike Bloomberg billionaire. I'm not wearing a $5,000 suit." Through May 15, Catsimatidis (a self-financed candidate) had spent $880,000 on the campaign, mostly on television and radio ads, but also on billboards and items including lip balm and groceries. He hired a campaign consulting firm, Millennial Strategies LLC, that mostly works on Democratic campaigns.

On a December 13 appearance on Inside City Hall, Catsimatidis compared raising taxes on the wealthy to how "Hitler punished the Jews".

Catsimatidis expressed support for the New York City stop-and-frisk program, and two weeks after the Boston Marathon bombing, his campaign ran a radio ad attacking "career politicians want to end stop and frisk and cut the NYPD's powers of surveillance." At a candidates' forum Catsimatidis suggested that "a robot" or other future technology would make the stop-and-frisk program unnecessary in the future, but stated that until that time the program should continue.

At campaign events in April 2013, Catsimatidis claimed that he could have beaten Barack Obama in the 2012 presidential election and got into a contentious exchange with various Republican audience members, telling one to "go bullshit yourself if you want!"

Among the "off-the-cuff—and off-beat—policy proposals" that Catsimatidis suggested during the campaign included giving police tricycles to improve mobility, allowing casinos in hotels, and launching a program to give free pet food to people who adopt homeless animals. Catsimatidis's economic proposals include a revival of the 1964 New York World's Fair. The New York Times reported that Catsimatidis "struck an odd note when discussing education policy, expressing unease about the makeup of his daughter's graduating class from New York University's Stern School of Business," stating that "I think close to 480 of the 580 were Asian—Asian including India. And, it was scary. And then when you think about it, we’re going to deport most of these kids."

Catsimatidis called for street vendors to be limited to certain areas, and prohibiting setting up within 300–500 feet of stores selling the same products, complaining at a candidates' forum that "We have cart people right in front of our doorstep. They're selling bananas for half price in front of my own stores. That is wrong."

In the September 2013 Republican primary, Catsimatidis lost to Joseph J. Lhota, receiving 24,864 votes to Lhota's 32,236 votes. Catsimatidis did carry the borough of Staten Island.

Catsimatidis could have chosen to contest the general election on two other ballot lines, either that of the Liberal Party of New York and of a third-party line he created in summer 2013, but two days after his primary, he announced that he would withdraw from the race.

=== Since 2013 ===
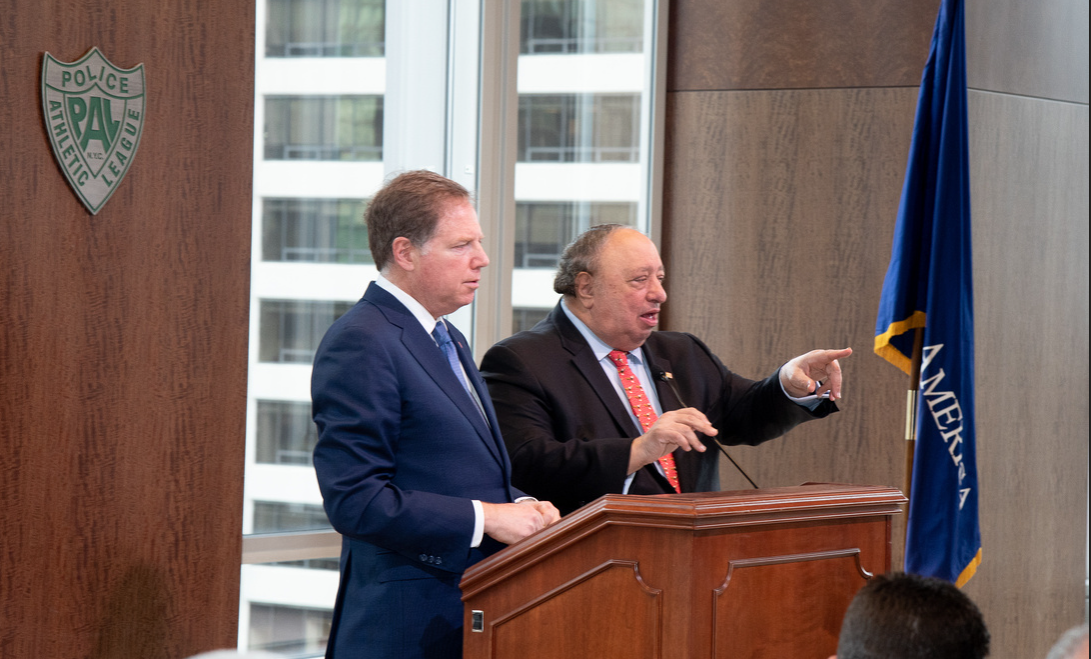
Former U.S. Attorney Geoffrey S. Berman and Catsimatidis delivering remarks at the Police Athletic League's Business Luncheon in 2018

Together with his spouse, Catsimatidis contributed $515,000 to Donald Trump's 2020 presidential campaign, and he is a vocal Trump supporter.

The New York Times reported in October 2020 that Catsimatidis and his family run the Manhattan Republican Party; his daughter Andrea is the chairwoman, and Catsimatidis, his wife Margo Catsimatidis, and his son John Catsimatidis Jr. are vice-presidents. Between February and July 2020, Catsimatidis contributed $50,000 of the party's $52,000 of income.

Catsimatidis said he considered running in the 2021 New York City mayoral election. He originally suggested he'd run as a Democrat, but retracted that and suggested he would either run again as a Republican or as a member of the Liberal Party.

Catsimatidis told the Washington Examiner in April 2023 that he was ruling out supporting Florida governor Ron DeSantis in the 2024 Republican Party presidential primaries, due to the latter not returning his phone calls.

On April 24, 2024, in an interview with Steve Bannon, Catsimatidis hinted at a potential run in the 2025 New York City mayoral election. He spoke about law and order, and proposed to clean up the streets in 60 days. He also said he would pressure the president of Columbia University to stop pro-Palestinian protesters, and supported nuclear energy. On March 7, 2025, in an interview on WABC radio's (Note: Catsimatidis's Red Apple Media group owns WABC) Sid & Friends in the Morning, Catsimatidis dismissed speculation that he would be running for mayor, saying "I don't think I'll run", but when asked if he would run in the 2026 New York gubernatorial election, he said "you never know what can happen." During the 2025 New York City mayoral election, Catsimatidis threatened to move his stores from New York to New Jersey if Zohran Mamdani won the election. After Mamdani won the election, Catsimatidis said he was reconsidering moving.

== Acting ==
Catsimatidis played Christopher Galanis in the 2025 film Marty Supreme, which was set and filmed in New York City and was directed by Josh Safdie.

== Personal life ==
On October 2, 1988, Catsimatidis married Margaret "Margo" Vondersaar at the Greek Orthodox Archdiocesan Cathedral of the Holy Trinity in New York; the two had met when she became his secretary in 1972. A previous marriage had ended in divorce; he stated that he was "sometimes" together with Margo while still married to his first wife. At the time of their wedding, Margo led her own advertising agency, MCV Advertising Associates in New York, and was president of The Hellenic Times.

Catsimatidis and Margo have two children, Andrea and John Jr. Andrea married Christopher Cox, grandson of former President Richard Nixon, on June 4, 2011, at the Greek Orthodox Archdiocesan Cathedral of the Holy Trinity, "before a church packed with family members and political powerhouses." Catsimatidis said that he spent "in excess of $1 million" on the wedding. Andrea Catsimatidis and Cox divorced in 2014.

In the 2024 Forbes 400 "richest people in America" list, Catsimatidis ranked 299th, with a personal net worth estimated at $4.5 billion; in the Forbes list of global billionaires, he ranked No. 734.

== Philanthropy ==
As of 2001, Catsimatidis was one of the largest donors to the G&P Foundation for Cancer Research He founded and was co-chairman of Brooklyn Tech Endowment Foundation, which benefited his alma mater. Catsimatidis funds the John Catsimatidis Scholarship Fund at the New York University Stern School of Business, which has since 1988 awarded two scholarships each year. Catsimatidis was for five years president of the Manhattan Council of the Boy Scouts of America. He has been on the board of directors of the Police Athletic League of New York City, and the Drum Major Institute.

Other organizations with which Catsimatidis has been active are the National Kidney Foundation, Juvenile Diabetes Foundation, Young Men's Philanthropic League, and Alzheimer's Foundation of America. Catsimatidis was the vice-chairman of the Ellis Island Awards Foundation of the National Ethnic Coalition Organization (NECO), and received an Ellis Island Medal of Honor from that organization.

In light of the 2022 Russian invasion of Ukraine, Catsimatidis created the WABC Radio Foundation to provide humanitarian relief for Ukrainians in need.
