= Plum District =

- Website type: Electronic Commerce
- Founded: 2009
- Key people: Susan Kim CEO; Jennifer Nuckles [VP of Marketing & Merchandising]; Raul Vazquez
- Website: PlumDistrict.com
- Commercial: Yes
- Registration: None
- Launched: March, 2010
- Current status: Active

Plum District is headquartered in San Francisco and offers national deals in North America along with local deals in markets including Orange County, Los Angeles, New York City, San Diego, Denver, and San Francisco. In March 2011, Plum District was selected by Facebook as one of nine partners in its short-lived foray into daily deals. Plum District teamed with The Walt Disney Company to launch Disney Family Deals in July 2012.

Founded by Megan Gardner, Susan Kim, who had been serving as interim CEO, permanently took control of the company in March 2013. Raul Vazquez, ex CEO of Walmart.com, joined the board of directors in December, 2011. Vazquez was named number 14 on Money Magazine's 40 under 40 list for 2010.

From its peak coverage in 27 metro areas, by August 2012 the company had undergone significant contraction, nearly 50%, and sustained several rounds of layoffs.

In July 2020, Plum District was acquired by Coupon Lawn.

== Funding ==
In Series A funding, Plum District received $8.5M in funding from Kleiner Perkins Caufield & Byers and General Catalyst Partners, two top U.S. venture firms. Previous financing, also Series A, of $2.1M came from a collection of angel investors.

In December 2011, the company raised a combined $20 million from General Catalyst Partners, Kleiner Perkins, Comcast, and Duke University in Series C funding.

== Business model ==
Plum District introduces a distinct deal of the day in each of the local markets it serves. The deal is mailed or delivered electronically to local and national Plum District subscribers. Like all Deal Of The Day sites, Plum District's revenue is generated from affiliate marketing, advertising placements, and joint ventures with the merchants with whom they work.

== Acquisitions ==
The company acquired merchant loyalty business Chatterfly and New York based daily deal business DoodleDeals, in December 2011.

In 2013, Plum District acquired AngelPad-backed Spotivate, the first acquisition by then-new president Susan Kim.
