= Warm Biscuit Bedding Company =

American online retailer

- Company type: Retailer
- Founded: 1998
- Founder: Vicki Bodwell
- Headquarters: New York City, U.S.
- Products: Children's bedding, furniture, fabrics, apparel, accessories, toys, gifts
- Services: Customization, monogramming, personalization

Warm Biscuit Bedding Company is a New York City-based retailer of children's bedding, furniture, fabrics, apparel, accessories, toys and gifts.

Founded in 1998 by Vicki Bodwell, Warm Biscuit Bedding was among companies featured in Crafting a Business: Make Money Doing What You Love by Kathie Fitzgerald. Vicki Bodwell was recognized as an outstanding female entrepreneur in 1999 by Victoria Magazine and in 2006 by Country Living. Bodwell's tips and anecdotes have been quoted in articles in The New York Times, Entrepreneur and CNET News, among other publications. She has been a QVC guest host for Country Living Quilts.

== Origin of the name ==
As explained by the owner, a memory from her Texas childhood was the origin of the company name. At bedtime, children were told to climb into their warm "biscuits", or beds by their Grandmother.

== Growth ==
From its inception as a home-based business, Warm Biscuit Bedding expanded to an office in downtown New York City with a workshop and warehouse in Oklahoma and then a larger remote facility in Colorado. Marketing initially through a mail-order catalog, the company later opened an online store. The product line featured retro fabric designs and grew to include a selection of custom, monogram and personalized items.

== Product ==
Customers can customize their bedrooms and add vintage bedding and fabrics among other furniture options.
