= EarnIn =

American financial services company

- Formerly: ActiveHours
- Industry: Financial services; Financial technology
- Founded: 2013; 13 years ago
- Founder: Ram Palaniappan
- Headquarters: Palo Alto, California
- Area served: North America
- Services: Earned wage access, Payroll, Credit report monitoring, Bank account
- Number of employees: 200+ (2021)
- Website: earnin.com

EarnIn is an American earnings management company that provides earned wage access services and other financial and payroll-related services.

Founded by Ram Palaniappan in 2013 as Activehours, the company launched its app in May 2014 to provide earned wage access services, and has since expanded to include services including free credit monitoring, balance alerts, bill reminders, savings features, and payroll.

== History ==
Earnin was founded by Ram Palaniappan in 2013. Palaniappan, who helped launch RushCard, wanted to help people unlock their earned wages. EarnIn operates in the earned-wage access (EWA) industry, providing workers with on-demand access to wages they have already earned, but would otherwise wait to receive on payday. The service is not a loan, because the money is already earned and there is no interest charge or mandatory fee in many cases. By providing pay-earlier access, EarnIn addresses the cash-flow gaps and timing mismatches that some hourly workers experience, and reduces reliance on credit cards, payday loans, or overdrafts.

After a member's scheduled wages are deposited in their bank account by their employer, the company automatically withdraws the wages and the tip. EarnIn uses a "zero integration" B2B model, which allows companies to use EarnIn without integrating it into their payroll system.

After a year of development, Earnin launched its app in May 2014. At launch, the company was handling transactions for employees at 100 different companies; a few months later, this increased to 250 employers including Best Buy, Starbucks, Wells Fargo, and Bank of America.

Originally known as Activehours, the company rebranded to Earnin in November 2017.

In 2017 and 2018, Earnin raised $164 million across two rounds of fundraising, with venture capital firm A16z participating in both rounds.

In January 2023, the company rebranded from Earnin to EarnIn.

In September 2023, EarnIn abolished $22 million in medical debt in Phoenix, Las Vegas, and San Antonio. In 2024, EarnIn furthered its debt relief efforts by partnering with Forgive Co. Together, the two forgave over $10 million in debt held by those living in metro Atlanta.

In May 2024 EarnIn created a $50,000 fund to help cover overdraft charges incurred by its previous customers in the state of Connecticut.

Over time, EarnIn expanded its platform beyond earned wage access to include additional financial tools and payroll-related services. These include overdraft alerts, paycheck advance features, credit monitoring, savings tools, and employer payroll software. The company has also introduced products including Balance Shield, Cash Out, Early Pay, Tip Yourself, and EarnIn Payroll. Tip Yourself money is held at Evolve Bank & Trust and is FDIC insured.

EarnIn's Payroll is a payroll software platform that integrates payroll processing with HR, time and attendance, benefits, and employee self-service functions.

In March 2026, EarnIn's Live Pay had processed over one million transactions since its 2015 launch.

== Legal challenges ==
In April 2019, the New York State Department of Financial Services investigated whether the company's "tipping" system skirted New York State lending laws regulating payday lending. An article in the New York Post said that members who do not leave tips may have their monthly maximum restricted, which may trigger interest rate disclosure laws.

In March 2021, a federal court granted final approval of a $12.5 million settlement in a class action lawsuit against EarnIn, in which plaintiffs claimed that the company’s practices led to overdraft fees on their bank accounts.

In August 2024, a class-action lawsuit was filed against EarnIn in the U.S. District Court for the Northern District of California alleging that the company's optional fees and tips constituted hidden interest payments, violating Georgia's Payday Loan Act and the federal Truth in Lending Act (TILA).

In November 2024, the Attorney General for the District of Columbia filed a lawsuit against EarnIn, alleging that the company deceptively marketed its earned wage advance services. The case was dismissed after determining that EarnIn's advances were not loans.
