= DormAid =

- Company type: Private Partnership
- Industry: Consumer Services
- Founded: 2005
- Headquarters: New York, New York
- Key people: Carlo Passacantando, CO-CEO; Otto Magdanz, CO-CEO
- Products: Laundry; Bedding; Cleaning; Backup; Water; Appliances
- Number of employees: 50
- Website: www.dormaid.com

DormAid is a college services company founded by Michael E. Kopko and co-founded by Matthew Kopko, Robert Cecot, Shiva Kaul, Chris Acton-Maher, Elizabeth Knopf, and Jorge Aviles. DormAid initially only offered services on Harvard's campus in 2004. As of 2008, it currently offers personal services to college students on 1800 campuses nationwide. Additionally, it provides direct on-campus service at around 25 universities. DormAid's most popular service is a personal laundry pickup and delivery service, but it also offers professional room cleaning, bedding services, water delivery, a dorm bedding line, and online backup services.

DormAid has received considerable attention from the press, including features on Comedy Central's The Daily Show with Jon Stewart, CNN, NBC, CNBC, Fox News, The New York Times, The Washington Post, The Wall Street Journal and The Rush Limbaugh Show. DormAid has also been covered by numerous local and college newspapers at the campuses it services. The DormAid brand has appeared in books and print across the country and media attention often focuses on its innovative business model and unique approach to college services.

In 2007, DormAid received entrepreneurial recognition as a finalist in the Global Student Entrepreneurship Awards.

In 2009, DormAid was sold to New York-based entrepreneurs Otto Magdanz and Carlo Passacantando. The company is being run under their parent company along with their other companies, Lion Laundry and Valet Laundry.

== Services ==
- Personal Laundry Service
- Room Cleaning Service
- Dorm Room Bedding
- Water Delivery Service
- Appliance Sales
- Computer Back-up Service

== Business model ==
At universities with on-campus service, DormAid trains and employs local students (called presidents) to serve as the DormAid representative there.

Presidents have many roles which include marketing, branding and development. Presidents are given substantial responsibility and autonomy in making business decisions for DormAid on their campus; they essentially run their own businesses while still in school.
