= The Food Emporium =

American grocery store chain

- Food Emporium logo from the mid-2000s. (Key Food added the oval)
- Type: Private; Subsidiary
- Industry: Retail; Grocery
- Founded: New York, New York, United States (1919; 107 years ago)
- Founder: Louis Daitch
- Headquarters: Staten Island, NY, United States
- Number of locations: 3
- Area served: New York, New Jersey, Connecticut
- Parent: Key Food
- Website: foodemporium.keyfood.com

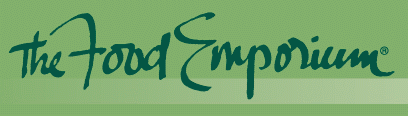
Previous logo

The Food Emporium is a chain of grocery stores in New York. The supermarket banner was created by Shopwell Inc., whose roots can be traced to Daitch Crystal Dairies (established 1919). Shopwell Inc. was acquired by The Great Atlantic & Pacific Tea Company (A&P) in 1986 and at the time, the company operated the upscale, gourmet banner stores in and around New York City; Westchester County, NY; and Fairfield County, CT. The Food Emporium grew throughout the 1990s, converting many of its New York-area A&P stores to The Food Emporium and expanding the chain to New Jersey. The 2000s brought new, stronger competition to the New York area, and the chain shrank, receding mostly to Manhattan. At the time of A&P's liquidation in 2015, The Food Emporium had 11 stores. The banner was acquired from bankrupt A&P in late 2015 by Key Food Stores Co-op, Inc., which currently operates three of The Food Emporium stores.

== History ==
=== Early origins ===
Food Emporium's history starts in 1919 when Louis Daitch founded Daitch Crystal Dairies, a public company trading on the American Stock Exchange. Over the years, he opened shops in the New York City area selling butter and eggs. Following World War II, Daitch Crystal Dairies enjoyed tremendous growth in the new supermarket format, emerging in the 1950s as a significant chain. In 1955, Daitch and its 34 stores (in New York City, Nassau, and Suffolk counties, and in Connecticut, merged with Shopwell Foods' chain of 18 Westchester County supermarkets. Shopwell was founded by Sigmund Rosengarten, who entered the supermarket business as a butcher. The supermarket chain (known under variations of the Daitch and Shopwell names) underwent a period of significant expansion. Within a year, seven new stores were opened and nine more were added by acquiring the Diamond K chain.

Daitch's supermarket chain peaked in 1962 with 103 stores, but the company's growth was not focused. It attempted to launch a chain of convenience stores called Shop-Quik and in 1970 opened Shopwell Plaza in Westport, Connecticut, a shopping center that included Daitch's attempt at running a package (liquor) store. In 1973, Daitch changed its name to Shopwell Inc., now headed by Rosengarten's son Martin Rosengarten, who was aided by his sons, Jay and Glen. A year later, the company entered Vermont and Massachusetts; opening a combined seven stores. The venture did not work out, however, and in 1976 the company sold off these units, incurring an $800,000 loss.

Following their failure in New England, the Rosengartens took stock of their situation. First, they concluded that for Shopwell to succeed it needed to focus on being a regional chain. The company reached a turning point during a 1979 management meeting. The participants made a chart with the names of the three Rosengartens at the top and 33 vice-presidents listed below them. When asked to whom they reported, the vice-presidents pointed at one another, but no one pointed to the three in charge. The chart became known in company lore as the "spaghetti chart." Shopwell was clearly in need of massive reorganization. The number of vice-presidents was reduced to just 12, and Martin Rosengarten turned over active control of the chain to his sons, who were both in their thirties. They began to close stores located in unprofitable areas and allowed other leases to expire so that the chain was reduced to 65 units. The company also conducted some market research, which revealed the unpleasant truth that Shopwell stores had no discernible image; customers patronized Shopwell stores out of convenience.

=== Food Emporium launch in 1979 ===
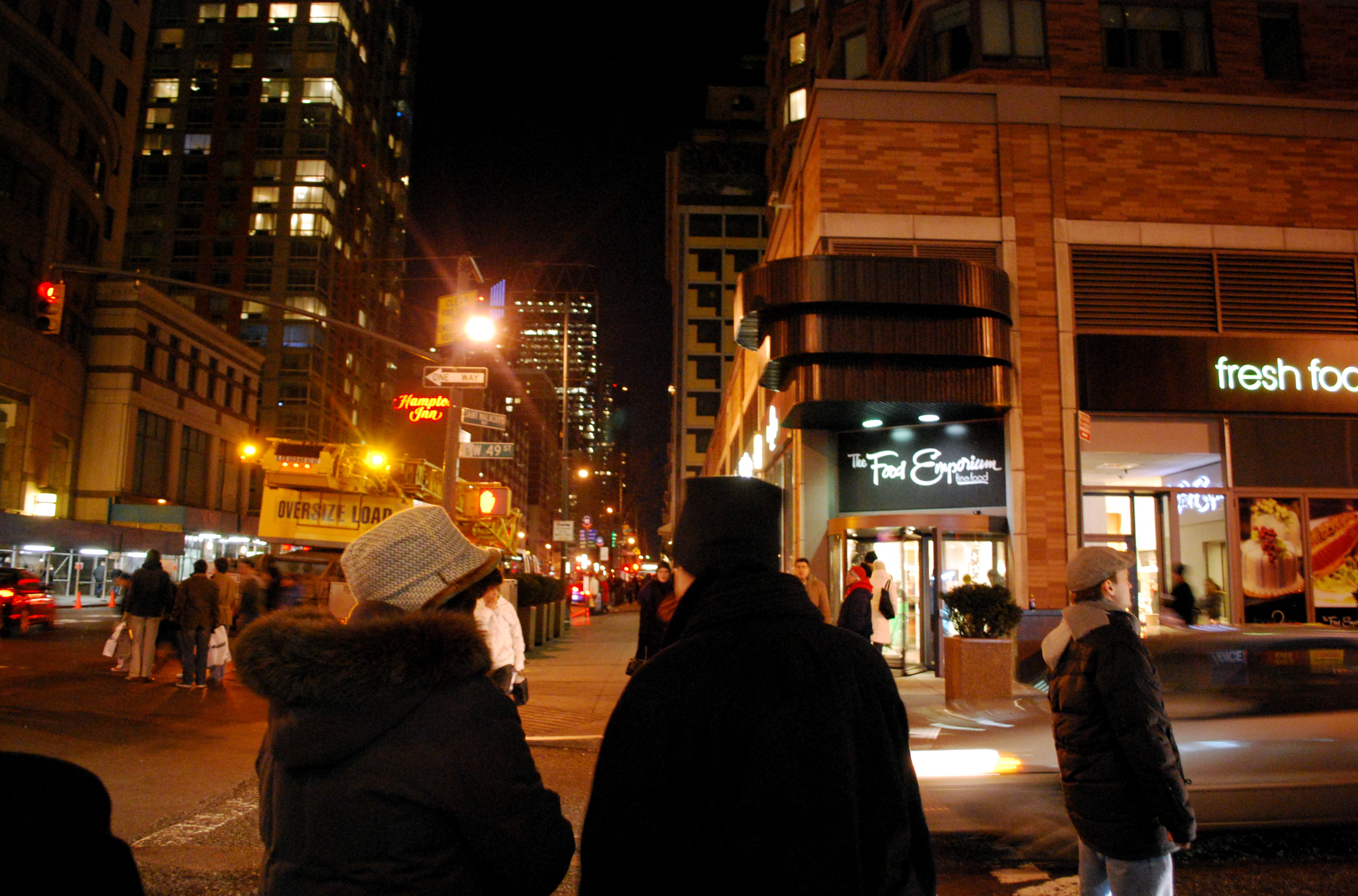
West 49th Street location, 2008

During the course of trimming the size of the chain, the Rosengartens noticed that the remaining stores were mostly located in upper-income neighborhoods, such as Manhattan's Upper East Side and in Westchester County. Not only did it make sense to cater to the higher-income customer, but the Rosengartens also recognized that no supermarkets in the area were doing much upscale marketing, leaving the business to smaller shops like Zabar's and Balducci's. From these insights came the idea of the Food Emporium format, which would mix regular and specialty items on the same shelves, rather than following the lead of other supermarkets, which at best offered a small gourmet corner. Elsewhere in the country the concept was already being refined, pioneered by Byerly Foods in Minneapolis, Minnesota in 1973. Grand Union was already in the process of developing specialty supermarkets in the New York market, making Shopwell's decision to launch the Food Emporium format in 1979 a timely one.

By the end of 1983, Shopwell had converted 17 of its 55 stores to the Food Emporium format. Another seven would be converted over the next two years, but the conversions proved costly. It took about 18 months for a Food Emporium to attain profitability, rather than the industry average of around eight months. Shopwell also tried moving into the economic sector of the supermarket trade, an effort that failed. A One-Stop Shop cash-and-carry store opened in 1984 and closed that same year. As a result of these and other factors, Shopwell lost $3.4 million in 1985 on sales of $464 million, and the Rosengarten brothers in 1986 (their father retired the year before) announced they were looking to sell the company.

=== A&P takes over ===
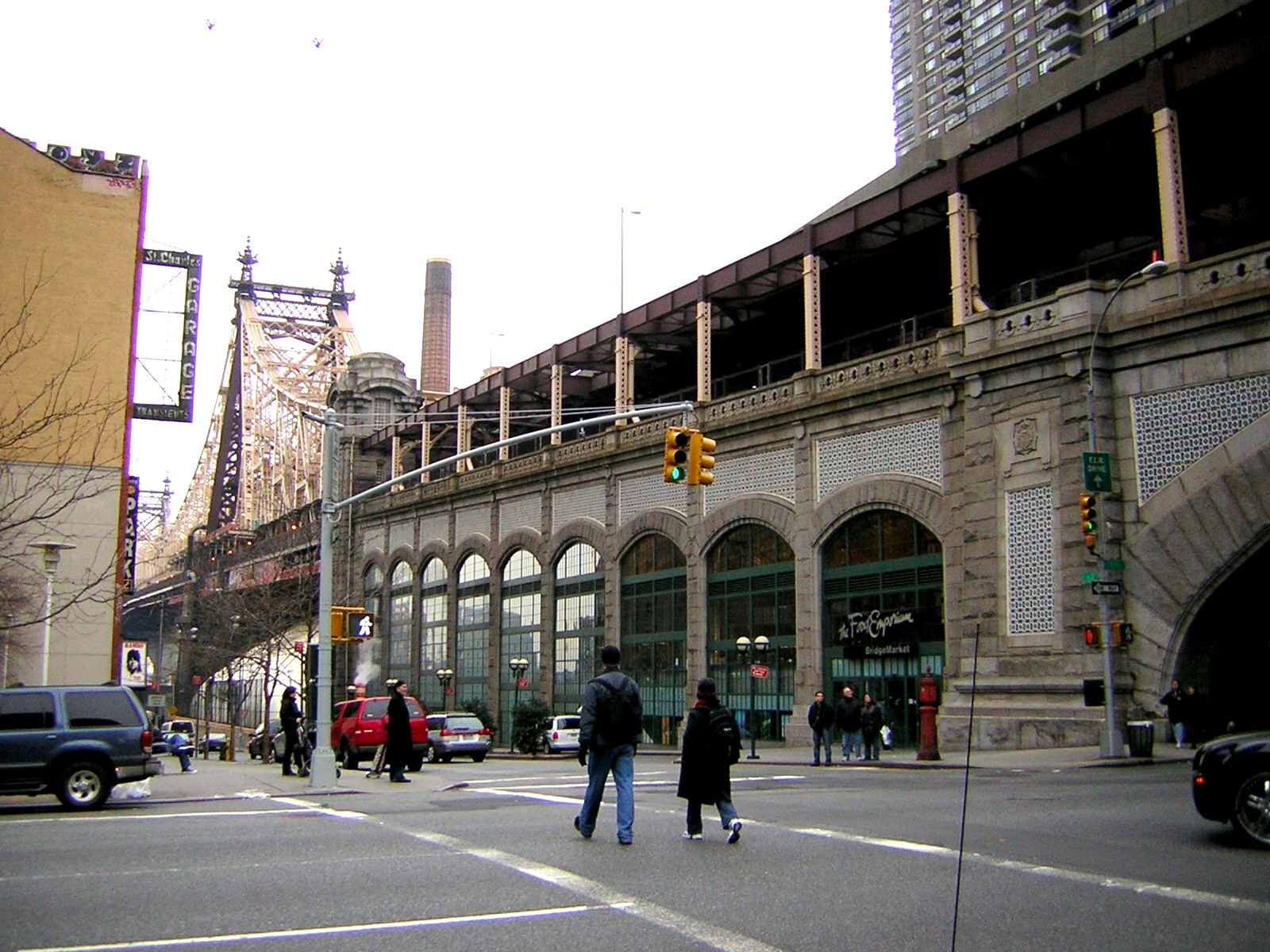
59th Street Bridgemarket location, 2008

The Rosengartens announced the sale of Shopwell to A&P in 1986 for $64 million. A&P, which acquired 91.5 percent of Shopwell's common shares, picked up 25 Shopwell stores, 3 Value Center Stores, 2 distribution centers, and a dairy, but the main reason it acquired Shopwell was to add The Food Emporium format to its portfolio. A&P was in the process of developing a format similar to The Food Emporium, called "A&P Food Bazaar"; A&P ditched the concept in favor of buying Shopwell and growing The Food Emporium chain.

In 1985, in an effort to strengthen its position in Canada, A&P acquired Dominion Foods and used The Food Emporium name in some stores soon after the acquisition. This format was garnished well into the mid-1990s.

After A&P's 1983 purchase of the Kohl's Food Stores chain in Wisconsin and Illinois, many of those stores were re-branded as Kohl's Food Emporium; new stores were opened as such. The Food Emporium remained the primary format of the Kohl's stores until the Midwestern chain folded in 2003; the Kohl's department store chain was not affected.

=== A&P bankruptcy and Key Food takeover ===
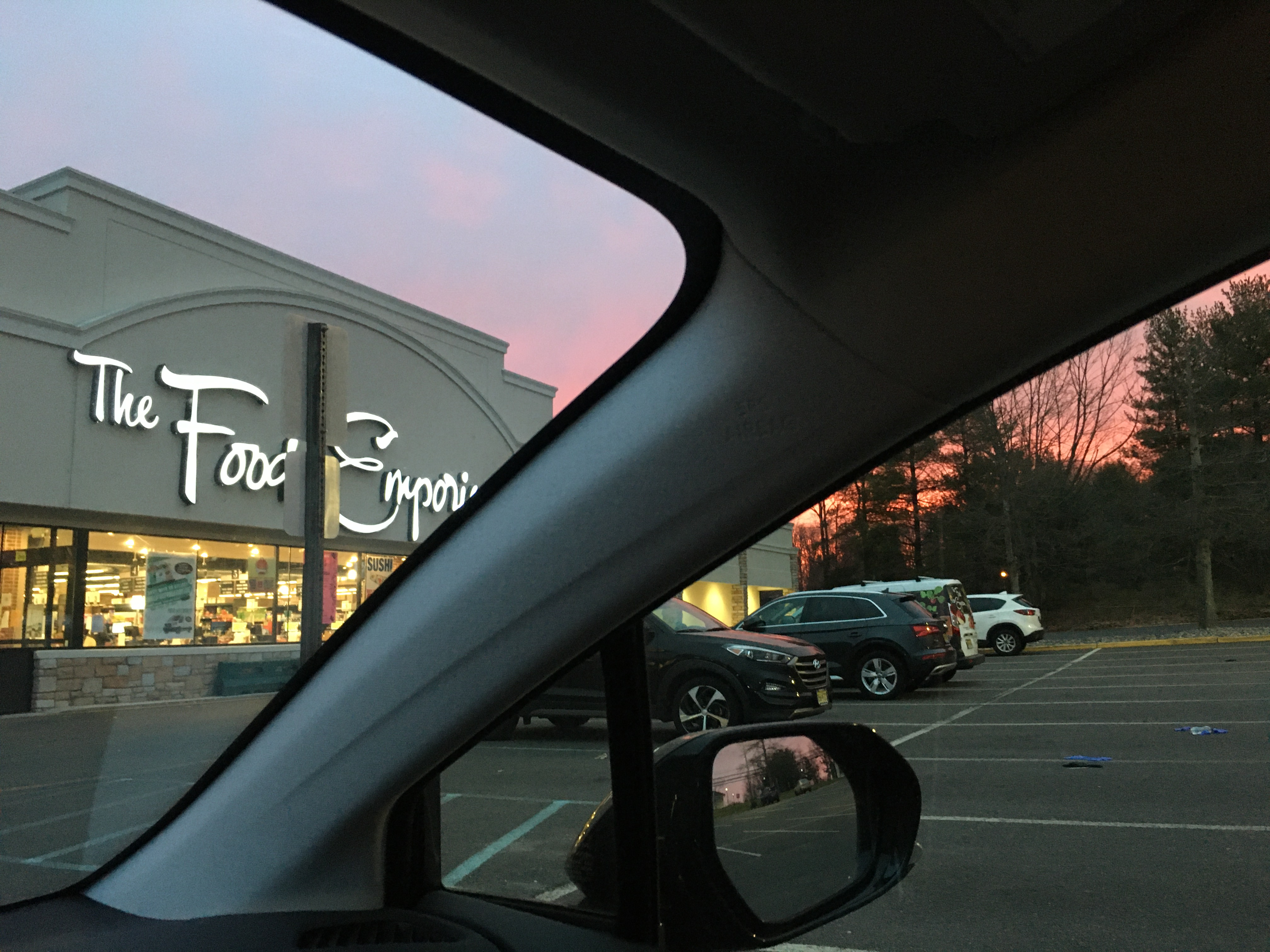
Marlboro, New Jersey location, opening early for seniors in 2020 during the initial days of the Covid-19 pandemic

A&P entered Chapter 11 bankruptcy protection on December 12, 2010, and exited on March 13, 2012. On September 11, 2012, A&P announced its intention to sell its 16 The Food Emporium stores as part of its plan to return to profitability. The stores, as a chain, did not attract enough interest, and a few were sold piecemeal to Morton Williams and CVS, while leases were not renewed at others.

On July 20, 2015, A&P announced that it was filing for bankruptcy for a second time. The company liquidated in late 2015, selling as many stores as possible to competitors, and closing the remainder. At the time, The Food Emporium operated 11 stores in Manhattan, and one in New Canaan, Connecticut. Almost all stores were sold to other operators, with the exception of the unprofitable 59th Street Bridgemarket store and one other store on the Upper East Side of Manhattan.

Key Food Stores Co-op. acquired the trademark and rights to The Food Emporium brand name and intellectual assets, including the website and mobile app during the A&P bankruptcy auction. Key Food also acquired four The Food Emporium stores during the liquidation. The other The Food Emporium stores were purchased by Morton Williams, Gristedes, and Acme Markets.

Key Food affiliates run the thirteen stores currently in operation, of which three are Food Emporium stores acquired from A&P, and ten are additional stores opened by Key Food.

== In popular culture ==
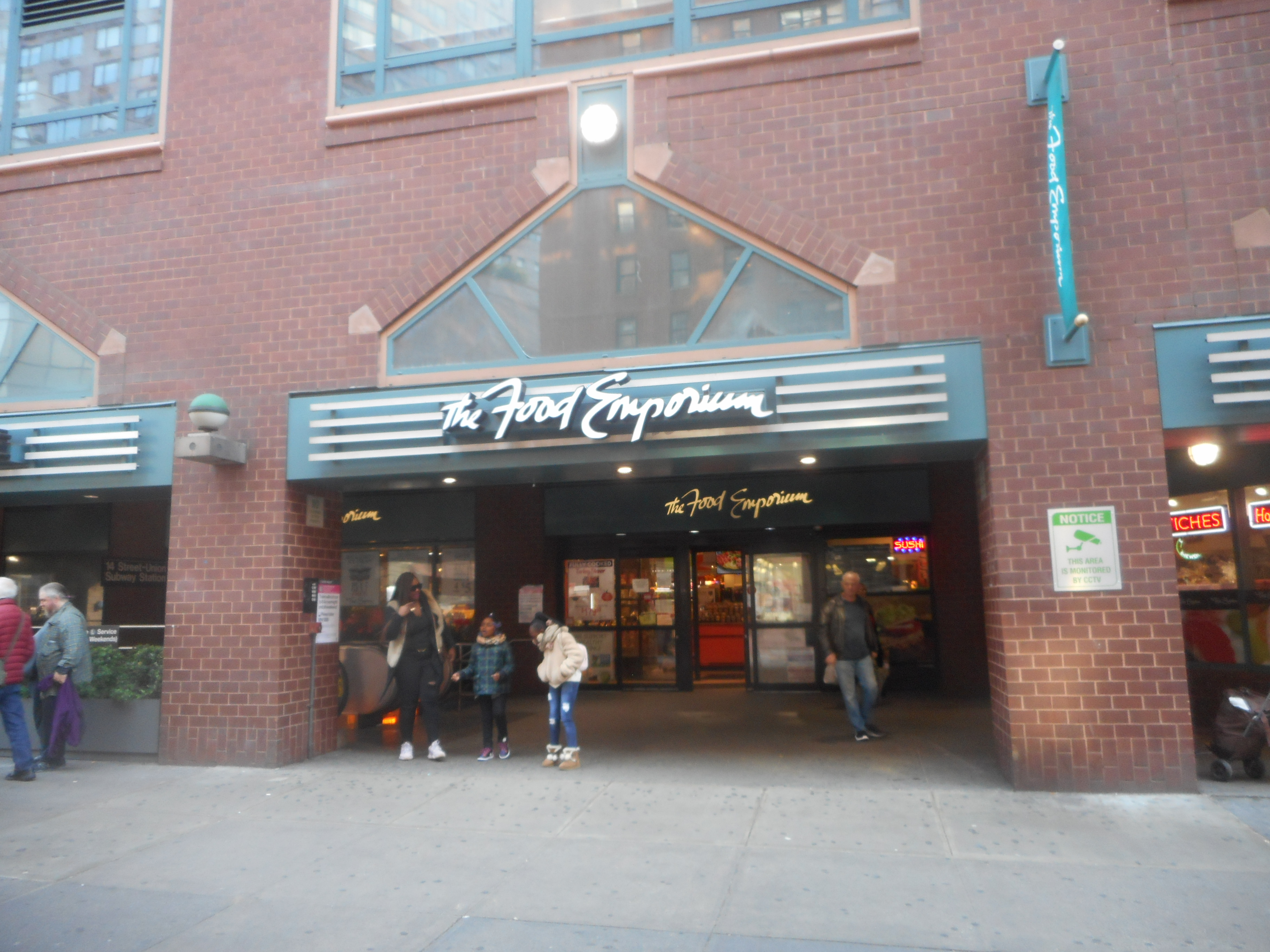
Union Square location, 2019

The Food Emporium is known for its late 1980s- early 1990s slogan, "Someone Made a Store Just for Me".

The Food Emporium was referenced in a joke by Christopher Moltisanti following a Thanksgiving turkey heist in The Sopranos Season 3 episode "He Is Risen".
