= Aventura (manga) =

Japanese manga series by Shin Midorikawa

- Cover of Aventura volume 1 as published by Kodansha
- Manga
- Written by: Shin Midorikawa
- Published by: Kodansha
- English publisher: NA: Del Rey Manga
- Magazine: Monthly Shōnen Sirius
- Original run: 2005 – 2015
- Volumes: 6

Aventura is a Japanese manga series written and illustrated by Shin Midorikawa. It has been serialized in Monthly Shōnen Sirius. As of February 2009, Kodansha has published 3 bound volumes of the manga.

The manga is licensed for an English released by Del Rey Manga. As of March 2009, Del Rey Manga has published 3 bound volumes of the manga.

== Synopsis ==
The story opens with Lewin Randit and his archenemy, first-year Darwell Turkfan clashing in the swordsmanship practice field. In combat, Darwell taunts Lewin calling him "loser-kun" not long after releasing a powerful sword wave, enraging Lewin. As his temper flares, he swings his sword over his head, breaking a rule of conduct, and knocks Darwell to the ground. Stabbing the earth beside Darwell's head he threatens Darwell, causing him to submit. Seconds after the fight, Professor Qualfer suddenly appears and grabs Lewin by the neck, scolds him for swinging his weapon above his head, and sends him to the infirmary to have his wounds patched. As the healer, Professor Milieu Rouge, cleans his scars, Lewin asks why she doesn't use magic to heal his wounds. He believes it is because he is the only student unable to use magic so that the healer would treat him differently. Milieu explains that although she has the power to heal with magic, she restrains herself because by doing so, she would upset the natural balance. As Lewin exits the infirmary he comes across a wall that separates the wizardry division with the swordsmanship classes. There, he is overwhelmed by painful memories of his peers, specifically Darwell, taunting him about his red hair and inability to use magic. Has the thoughts unravel, he ends up injuring himself by clouting the wall out of agony. As he cries, Lewin remarks that despite his perception of only feeling frustration at first, he still harbors that emotional pain. The following day, Lewin pays a visit to the school library in order the research methods to fix his rusty sword with. As he descends on a moving stairway, a book unexpectedly plummets from the sky, followed by a girl whom Lewin catches. Her weight sends him tumbling down the stairway as an elf rushes to the girl's aid. Noticing that she has injured Lewin, the girl attempts to patch his wounds with little success, apologizing for her inability to use healing magic. Upon hearing that, Lewin tells the girl the same thing that Milieu had told him the day before: Don't use magic for everything. The elf gathers Lewin's books before both the girl and elf recognize him as the "Red Haired Boy". They introduce themselves as Chris Cottonburg and Soela Evenport before proposing the fact that he is "famous". They go on to tell Lewin the rumors that they have heard of him. Lewin finally realizes how people think of him, believing that Soela and Chris were going to brag about their learning and ridicule him. Instead Chris complements Lewin for being a kind person for helping Soela. Soela thanks Lewin for his help and smiles at him, which takes him by surprise. Suddenly, a large object falls from above, which lands on Lewin's head. Soela remarks on how the beast creature usually stays away from people and suggests that maybe he wants to thank Lewin for his deed. Chris and Soela then tell Lewin of their assignment from the magic classes. They are to open a book sealed by a magic force. The only way to open it is to locate where all the hidden passageways are in the school. Easily, Lewin is able to tell the two where the passages are since he has spent much of time at the school observing. The books opens, much to Chris and Soela's delight. After the incident, Lewin becomes their friend, making him much more happy as noted by one of the school's enchanted cleaning maids. Every day, Lewin would meet Soela and Chris at the library. Eventually, Chris and Soela decide to smuggle Lewin into the Magic division of the school to thank him.

Eventually, Chis and Soela decide to show Lewin one of the classrooms. The find one that is unlocked, and hurry in. Lewin immediately begins to look around, touching many of the items in the room, including a bottle of undead seeds. He uncorks the bottle to look inside, but Soela hastily runs in to warn them of a teacher coming their way. As the trio rush out, Lewin places the bottle of undead seeds on the counter. It falls to the ground and shatters, exposing the seeds to oxygen. Due to the fact that oxygen causes the activation of the seeds, skeletons spring out. The skeletons eventually break out of the classroom and invade the campus, causing much panic. The invasion reaches the degree where it is necessary for teacher intervention.

== Characters ==
Lewin Randit (ルーウィン・ランディット, Rūnin Randitto) is the protagonist of the series. He has a reputation as the loser red-haired boy, and as the only student who could not use magic. Lewin is a hot-tempered boy who was invited to study at Gaius School of Witchcraft and Wizardry. As a student of swordsmanship, he is often taunted due to his appearance and his inability to use magic. But it was shown in Volume 1 that he might have contain special ability as he can see the invisible wall and also make small sparks by snapping his finger.
Flare (フレア, Furea) is Lewin's Guardian spirit summoned with his own strength and the red gem embedded on his sword. This sacred spirit renders the power to cause massive destruction.
Chris Cottonbug (クリス・コットンバーグ, Kurisu Kottonbāgu) is a high elf, who is also a student at Gaius School of Witchcraft and Wizardry. He is the son of an archbishop, and suffers the loss of his twin brother, Thies. He is highly skilled in the art of magic.
Fire Salamander (炎神(えんしん)フレア) is Chris's salamander familiar. This "wrath of eternal flame" is summoned by a blood sacrifice.
Soela (ソェンポート, Soera Evuenpōt) is from a family of beast tamers. Soela seems to be a very shy person, but opens up when she meets Lewin. She is a student at Gaius School of Witchcraft and Wizardry. She is a keen animal-lover.
Wotis (ウォーティス) is Soela's familiar who is a beast egg. It looks like an ordinary egg, with wings and a tail made up of bones. Wotis is a male.

== Volume list ==
No.	Original release date	Original ISBN	North America release date	North America ISBN
1	April 21, 2006	978-4-06-373023-4	November 2007	978-0-34-549744-4
2	February 23, 2007	978-4-06-373060-9	April 2008	978-0-34-550201-8
3	March 21, 2008	978-4-06-373109-5	February 2009	978-0-345-51076-1
4	February 23, 2009	978-4-06-373156-9	—	—
5	February 23, 2010	978-4-06-376211-2	—	—
6	December 9, 2015	978-4-06-376292-1	—	—

== Reception ==
Aventura has been compared to Harry Potter through the shared theme of magic schooling, as well as Naruto with regard to the central protagonist. The manga has been criticized for the similarity in its character designs and the derivative nature of its story. Jason Thompson's appendix to Manga: The Complete Guide commends the manga's combination of "shōjo-esque layouts with a shōnen self-esteem theme". He criticises the art for being "too ornate for its own good, and the uniformly cute, degendered, sparkly-haired characters are hard to tell apart".
