= Earned wage access =

Financial industry focused on early pay

Earned Wage Access (EWA) is a financial service that allows employees to access a portion of their earned and unpaid wages before the end of the regular payroll cycle. Earned Wage Access is an employer-offered benefit that allows workers to withdraw earned wages during the current payroll cycle, which is followed by an automatic payroll deduction to reflect funds already received.

Earned Wage Access is sometimes referred to as instant pay, earned income, early wage access, accrued wage access, or on-demand pay, though the latter is often also used to describe direct-to-consumer models, while Earned Wage Access refers to employer-integrated services.

Earned Wage Access is not a lending product, and there are not interest charges or required repayments in the future. Some similarly-named products that are not employer-affiliated have drawn scrutiny for offering high-interest, short-term loans.

Regulations in the United States relating to EWA are regularly evolving, with regulatory guidance provided primarily by the Consumer Financial Protection Bureau (CFPB) and several state agencies. Earned Wage Access is also available in the United Kingdom and many other countries.

== Earned Wage Access services ==
Earned Wage Access is an employee benefit that's directly integrated with employer payroll systems. EWA is typically available to workers through an employee's payroll app or a third-party EWA app.

EWA systems integrate directly with payroll systems to display updated working hours and earnings based on previously worked shifts. Accrued payroll earnings are made available to transfer to the employee's linked payment card, financial account, or other service providers using a variety of transfer methods.

Businesses offering EWA directly fund the transfers or work with partner companies to do so, allowing the employee to avoid third-party lending services, such as payday loans or unsecured personal loans. Workers are typically charged a transaction fee for using EWA, though some companies subsidize the cost for their employees.

EWA providers may be responsible for recollecting the advances they make the consumers. As such, they face risk if the user leaves their position during a pay period in which they used EWA. All in all, however, EWA providers face dramatically lower risk than other credit providers as the advances they make are backed by hours the loan recipient has already worked towards.

The Consumer Financial Protection Bureau determined that this type of EWA product is considered a "covered EWA" product that's not subject to the Truth in Lending Act or other credit-related regulations.

=== Direct-to-consumer alternatives ===
Several companies offer direct-to-consumer early payment services for workers without access to Earned Wage Access from their employers. These companies offer short-term loans based on employee-provided payroll data, paycheck deposit histories, and other methodologies to estimate or validate employee earnings prior to payday, and are considered a form of credit by the CFPB.

While direct-to-consumer payroll advance products may charge flat fees, rather than an interest rate, the effective cost of some of these short-term loans exceeds 300%.

== History ==
The first Earned Wage Access provider, Payactiv, began offering the service in 2012. Payactiv and its founder Safwan Shah are widely credited with creating EWA.

Adoption of EWA expanded in the 2010s, and by 2022 payroll provider ADP reported that four in five U.S. employers offered some form of EWA. Providers have been positioned as an ethical solution to payday lenders as they typically charge a small flat fee rather than interest, and there is no recourse, credit impacts, or underwriting in Earned Wage Access transactions.

=== US Market ===
In 2012, Payactiv launched the first Earned Wage Access program. In 2013, Jersey Precast Construction began offering EWA through Payactiv, becoming the first employer to offer EWA.

In 2014, Activehours, later rebranded as EarnIn, launched a direct-to-consumer EWA app.

In August 2016, Uber began offering EWA to ridershare drivers in a partnership with Green Dot, allowing drivers to request their earnings after each drive for a fee. Lyft later added a similar feature in 2019, in partnership with Mastercard.

In December 2017, Walmart introduced Earned Wage Access (EWA) for its 1.4 million U.S. associates through a partnership with Payactiv. The relationship expanded to allow U.S. users to access their earned wages in cash at any Walmart store.

In July 2018, ADP, the largest payroll provider in America, added a Payactiv-powered EWA solution in the ADP marketplace.

In 2020, US workers made approximately 56 million withdrawals through EWA platforms, totaling around $9.5 billion.

=== UK Market ===
The official UK government term is Employer Salary Advance Scheme. In the UK where the typical pay cycle is monthly, rather than bi-weekly as is the case in the US, Earned Wage Access may be attractive to a wider number of income demographics.

In August 2021, FTSE 100 accounting software company Sage Group entered the UK Earned Wage Access market by introducing an EWA feature within its payroll platform, marking one of the first major business software providers to adopt the model.

As recommended by the Financial Conduct Authority, the UK’s leading providers of Earned Wage Access and on-demand pay have come together and created the world's first EWA code of practice.

== Legal and regulatory ==
=== United States ===
In November, 2020, the Consumer Financial Protection Bureau announced a new advisory opinion policy regarding EWA services.

In December, 2020, the Consumer Financial Protection Bureau issued a sandbox approval order to Payactiv to begin offering EWA services. After changes to the Payactiv product, the CFPB withdrew this sandbox approval in June, 2022.

A growing number of states have implemented regulatory laws and license requirements for EWA service providers, including Arkansas, Connecticut, Kansas, Missouri, Nevada, South Carolina, Utah, and Wisconsin.

In January 2024, Connecticut modified the state's Small Loans Act to define EWA advances as loans subject to a maximum annual percentage rate of interest, effectively ending EWA in the state.

In July 2024, the CFPB clarified rules regarding the clear disclosure of all fees and charges, including a review of the controversial tip-based payment method for paycheck advance products.

In April 2025, New York Attorney General Letitia James filed a lawsuit against two earned wage access providers, alleging that their products functioned as illegal payday loans under state law by charging unlawful interest rates and fees in violation of consumer protection statutes. The companies disputed these claims, arguing that EWA services are not loans but tools that allow workers to access already earned wages. In January 2026, both firms moved to dismiss the lawsuits, citing a recent advisory opinion from the Consumer Financial Protection Bureau.

=== United Kingdom ===
In the UK, the government is broadly optimistic about the sector and appears to be encouraging take-up. This is possibly in response to several think tanks and charities throwing their reputation behind the concept.

== Benefits ==
A Harvard Business School study found that EWA can improve employee retention and lower turnover rates. U.S. employers have also reported savings from reduced reliance on paper checks.

Earned Wage Access is promoted as bringing income more inline with expenses, helping workers to avoid cash flow issues that could result in them taking out more expensive traditional payday loans.

Many Earned Wage Access providers also highlight the benefits to the employer, including quicker recruitment, better staff retention, a more motivated workforce and a greater staff appetite for overtime and extra shifts. Marketing claims vary across the industry, from reducing staff turnover by 50% to increasing shift uptake by 26%.

Earned Wage Access technology can be implemented in various ways: automatically loaded onto a prepaid card, deposited via ACH onto a user's existing direct deposit, or, in a bifocal approach, accrued earnings are transferred into a bank account facilitated by the EWA provider.

== Controversies ==
Consumer risk is highly dependent on the specific strategy the EWA provider chooses to take when offering the advances.

Reputable providers limit advances to a percentage of total income and offer no-fee or low-fee withdrawal options. Others encourage frequent use, including daily withdrawals and no limits on usage, to maximize fees. This can lead to employees receiving no funds on payday.

== See also ==
- On-demand pay
- Payroll
- DailyPay
- Dave (company)
- Earnin
