= StockTouch =

- Type: Private company
- Industry: Stock Market Analysis
- Founded: 2011
- Defunct: April 7, 2016
- Fate: Closed down
- Headquarters: New York City, United States
- Key people: Jennifer Johnson
- Products: StockTouch app
- Website: www.stocktouch.com

StockTouch was visual stock market analysis and tracking app for iPad and iPhone that was discontinued in 2016. The app has been developed by Visible Market, Inc.

StockTouch was noted for its intuitive, game-like interface, and until it closed down, was consistently rated in the top finance apps for iPad, and had been recognized as one of the top 5 stock market apps.

The application was closed down by Johnson on the 7 April, 2016.

== History ==
StockTouch was created to give users a visual picture of the overall state of the stock market. It merged real time financial information with data visualization technology. Visible Market is a New York-based company.

The concept for the app was based on a desire to clarify vast amounts of financial data. The developers noticed a trend among business professionals to move away from desktop tools and towards mobile ones. In response, they initiated the creation of a different, non-linear app which would visually track stock market trends. StockTouch was intended as a platform that provided “democratized” financial information for making the stock market more accessible to the general public. To that end, Visible Market was a forerunner among tech companies to use game engine technology and animation in the design of its mobile app, with the goal of helping users to visualize and navigate financial data.

StockTouch debuted on June 29, 2011 at a cost of $4.99. It spent several weeks as the most downloaded paid financial app. In order to reach an even wider audience, Johnson announced that with the launch of StockTouch 1.9, the app would be available for free beginning in April 2013.

On September 1, 2016, the app relaunched, only to shut down again on Q1 of 2017.

== Product ==
The StockTouch app provided a dynamic, “at-a-glance” portrait of the stock market. The user was initially presented with a screen of organized tiles representing a “tactile heat map” of stock activity.

The app tracked thousands of stocks, organized into nine industry sectors: Consumer, Services, Healthcare, Energy, Technology, Financial, Industrial, Materials, and Utilities. Users touched the individual tiles, each with a color corresponding to the stock's degree of positive or negative performance. Selecting a tile displayed information about the stock including user-specified time graphs and relevant news items. Stock information was refreshed every five minutes which was provided in partnership with Xignite. StockTouch was hosted on AWS and was used by Wall Street traders, executives, investors and academics.

== Recognition ==
- Reached #1 in Finance Apps, iPad, April 3, 2013
- Apple Rewind, “#1 finance app,” 2011
- Apps Magazine, “Best Work App,” 2011
- One of “Best 10 Business Apps for iPad”
- Visible Market, Inc. selected as FinTech Innovation Lab incubator company, 2012
