= EquityZen =

Online trading marketplace

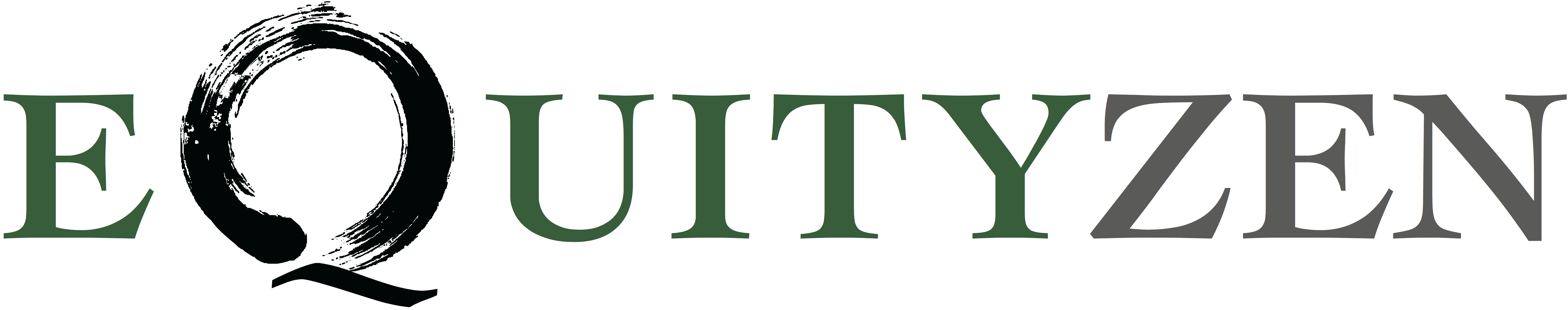
- Type: Private
- Industry: Financial technology, Investment
- Founded: 2013; 13 years ago
- Founder: Atish Davda; Shriram Bhashyam; Phil Haslett
- Headquarters: New York City, U.S.
- Area served: Worldwide
- Key people: Atish Davda (CEO)
- Products: Secondary Market
- Services: Electronic trading platform Online marketplace
- Owner: Morgan Stanley
- Website: equityzen.com

EquityZen is an online marketplace for trading pre-IPO employee shares from privately held companies. The platform often links employees from private companies with investors who would not otherwise be able to invest in the company prior to an IPO. It is based in Manhattan's Flatiron District.

On January 27, 2026, Morgan Stanley announced that it had completed its purchase of the company.

== History ==
EquityZen was founded in 2013 by Atish Davda, Shriram Bhashyam and Phil Haslett in New York City. From its outset, the firm was designed to allow employees of private companies to sell their equity to accredited investors.

It started out as part of the 500 Startups accelerator program in the fall of 2013. EquityZen received seed funding in January 2014 and as of September 2015 had raised Series A funding from undisclosed investors.

It has raised $6.5 million in outside financing, including a $3M injection in 2017 led by Tim Draper's Draper Associates. The financial technology firm was mentioned in the 2015 Forbes' Fintech 50 list.

In January 2026, three months after agreeing to buy EquityZen, it was reported that Morgan Stanley had completed the transaction.

== Service ==
EquityZen operates a marketplace in which employee shareholders in private companies can make their equity available to outside investors. In addition to traditional share transfers, EquityZen introduced a new offering in the private shares market by working with the issuer to register a transfer of shares so employees and early investors can sell a portion of shares for cash without having to wait until an IPO or acquisition. The firm works exclusively with companies that have already raised capital from large, institutional investors. Companies need to have at least $50 million in enterprise value to be listed on the marketplace. The minimum investment amount for investors is $20,000.

Financial advisors, who manage capital on behalf of others, invest their clients' capital through the platform. Investors outside of the US have invested in private companies. EquityZen has transacted in over half of the largest 25 private venture capital-backed companies, including Lyft, Evernote, and AppNexus.
