= Gadget Flow =

Curated e-commerce marketplace

Gadget Flow Inc
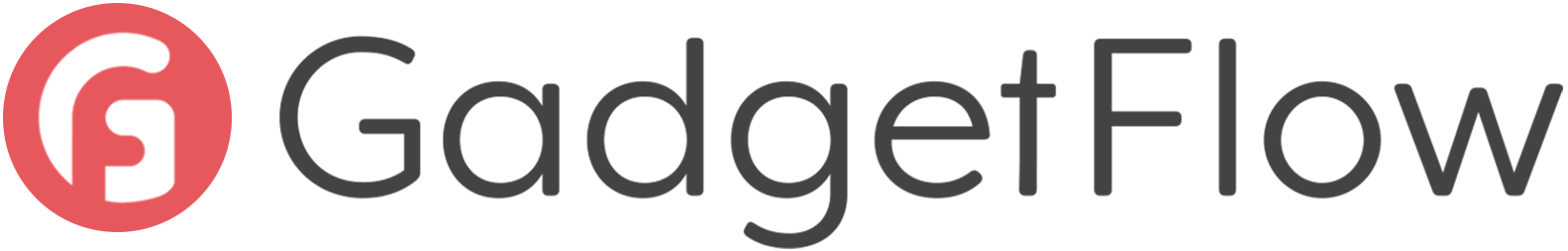
- Official Gadget flow logo
- Type: C corporation
- Industry: Online Retail, Internet Marketing
- Founded: August 15, 2012; 13 years ago
- Founders: Evan Varsamis, Cassie Ousta, Mike Chliounakis
- Headquarters: New York City, New York, U.S.
- Area served: Worldwide
- Services: Online shopping, Internet marketing
- Website: thegadgetflow.com

Gadget Flow (also known as The Gadget Flow) is a curated e-commerce marketplace based in New York City. It was launched in 2012 in Greece by Evan Varsamis, Cassie Ousta, and Mike Chliounakis. With 22 million visits per month, it is among the largest product-search engines, emphasizing product research from platforms such as Amazon, Etsy, Kickstarter, IndieGogo, and other crowdfunding platforms.

== History ==
In 2012, Gadget Flow was founded in an apartment in Athens, Greece by college students Evan Varsamis, Cassie Ousta, and Mike Chliounakis as a design inspiration blog. Its first revenues came from banner advertising around published content on new products from Greek designers and artists on Amazon.com and Etsy. The team added a “buy now” button after each product review, redirecting visitors to the artisan's website.

In early 2013 the site's founders added digital advertising and social media services, but after seeing The Gadget Flow website traffic triple after a relaunch, they refocused on the core business. The company drew attention from its exhibitions at tech events and conferences, including Web Summit Dublin held in November 2014 and The Next Web Conference NYC held in November 2015.

In 2014 the site launched iOS and Android applications for product search. Product features include live video product reviews with interactive question-and-answer sessions.

The company launched The Gadget Flow Shop in August 2016.

In 2018 Gadget Flow launched the first episode of its podcast about marketing, crowdfunding, and product placement.

In 2023, Gadget Flow was acquired by The Crowdfunding Formula.

== Leadership ==
Gadget Flow is managed by CEO Astghik Azaryan.

Other key executives are:

- Mike Chliounakis (Chief Operating Officer)
- John Antoniou (Chief Technology Officer)

== Products and services ==
Gadget Flow assists customers to discover, buy and save on products. The company advertises brands and businesses to their targeting community.

As of 2017, Huffington Post reported that the site had featured over 6,000 products, with Gadget Flow topping its list of smart shopping apps.

In Fall 2017, news outlets reported that Gadget Flow enabled Apple's ARKit and simultaneous localization and mapping technology to show products in augmented reality.

== Recognitions ==
In October 2016 The Next Web named The Gadget Flow one of the most promising tech startups of 2016.

In 2017 Entrepreneur magazine listed the site as a "secret weapon" to crowdfunding success.

Gadget Flow was named one of the "Best Entrepreneurial Companies in America" by Entrepreneur magazine's 2017 Entrepreneur 360 list.
