= Makovsky (agency) =

New York City integrated communications firm

Makovsky & Co Inc
- Industry: Public relations Advertising; Digital Marketing; Marketing
- Founded: 1979
- Headquarters: New York City
- Key people: Ken Makovsky (founder and CEO)
- Website: makovsky.com

Makovsky is an integrated communications firm based in New York City, with an additional office operating out of Washington D.C. The agency ranked 23rd among independent PR firms, and employs 30 people.

Makovsky has teams focused in health, financial, & professional services, technology, consumer, energy, and sustainability industries. The firm provides counsel in public relations, branding, social media, crisis communications, and advertising.

Ken Makovsky founded the agency in 1979. He is a member of the PR News Hall of Fame, and recipient of the John W. Hill Award for outstanding contributions to the public relations field.
