= Aventura Technologies =

American electronics company

Aventura Technologies Inc.
- Industry: Security hardware and software, peripheral solutions
- Founder: Jack Cabasso
- Defunct: March 2024 (guilty plea)
- Headquarters: Commack, New York, U.S.
- Area served: United States
- Key people: Jack Cabasso (Managing Director)
- Products: Security hardware, security software

Aventura Technologies Inc was a New York-based company headquartered in Commack, that designed, developed, and marketed security hardware and software products and peripheral solutions, with the US government among its largest customers.

In March 2024, Aventura pleaded guilty to purchasing security hardware and software products from China, and fraudulently modifying them as US-manufactured before reselling to the US government, US military, and enterprises.

== History ==
Aventura Technologies was founded and de facto controlled by Jack Cabasso, who served as managing director. Cabasso had a criminal history dating to 1982, including convictions for grand larceny and fraud, and was sentenced to 21 months in prison in 1992 for tampering with a juror in an earlier federal fraud case. Prosecutors noted he also maintained "deep business relationships" in China. Cabasso, alongside six others, were arrested and charged with various counts, with 12 bank accounts and a yacht seized.

Aventura held government contracts valued at approximately $20.7 million between 2006 and 2018, selling to the United States Army, US Air Force, Marine Corps, and US Navy. These contracts explicitly prohibited the supply of goods from China and other specified countries.

Aventura Technologies was raided by federal authorities on November 7, 2019, for allegedly selling components made by China to the United States Army, US Air Force, Marines Corps, and US Navy while claiming that the components were made in the United States. The company and its senior management were charged with fraud, money laundering and illegal importation of equipment manufactured in China.

Aventura Technologies, Inc. was indicted on December 6, 2019, for its alleged participation in two schemes to defraud the United States, with associated charges of conspiracy to commit wire and mail fraud, unlawful importation, and money laundering.
