= Gristedes =

New York City-based chain of supermarkets

- Company type: Subsidiary
- Industry: Retail
- Founded: 1888; 138 years ago 42nd Street & Second Ave. Manhattan
- Founder: Diedrich & Charles Gristede
- Headquarters: New York City
- Number of locations: 31
- Area served: Manhattan; Brooklyn
- Key people: John Catsimatidis (CEO)
- Products: Supermarket
- Parent: Red Apple Group
- Website: gristedessupermarkets.com

Previous logo

Gristedes is an American chain of supermarkets based in New York City. It serves a mostly urban customer base.

== History ==
=== Gristede Brothers: 1891–1987 ===
Charles Gristede and his brother Diedrich came to the United States from Germany in 1888, found work in grocery stores, and in 1891 opened a tiny gaslit store at 42nd Street and Second Avenue in Manhattan. This site was then far uptown from the central shopping area, but close to housewives who walked or rode in private carriages to the store. A second store opened in Harlem—then a middle-class white neighborhood—in 1896. The business flourished and expanded, reaching suburban Westchester County in 1920 and Connecticut in 1926. Gristede Brothers also opened a wine and liquor store in Manhattan in 1933. When Charles Gristede died in 1948, the chain consisted of 141 stores in Manhattan, the Bronx, Westchester, and Connecticut. In 1956 it opened its first Long Island store, in Garden City.

In Manhattan, Gristede Brothers remained concentrated on the more affluent East Side, where it specialized in personal service and gourmet items and charged premium prices. It shipped items to customers around the world, including, for example, a Greek who wanted melons sent to him in Paris by air freight. The company had annual sales of about $60 million and 115 stores in all—including six liquor stores in Connecticut—when it was sold in 1968 to The Southland Corporation, owner of the 7-Eleven convenience store chain, for Southland stock valued at $11.5 million.

Southland retained the prior Gristede Brothers management and for more than a decade left the chain to its own devices. In 1977 Gristede's consisted of 120 stores, mostly ranging in size from 6,000 to 11,000 square feet and carrying 7,000 to 8,000 gourmet items, including size 23 grapefruit (about the size of a large cantaloupe), strawberries picked in California only 36 hours earlier, large Idaho potatoes already wrapped in tin foil, quiche Lorraine, and Beluga caviar.

By the early 1980s, however, Gristede's, as well as other supermarket chains with outlets in New York City, was reeling from a number of adverse conditions, including the small size of the stores, the high cost of delivery in the city, escalating rents, and competition from gourmet shops and specialty food stores. In 1980 the chain still consisted of 100 outlets, including 24 Charles & Co. sandwich shops, but by 1983, when Gristede's fell into the red, there were only 84. During 1983–84 Gristede's concentrated its operations in Manhattan, closing 36 stores and its warehouse. In 1985 there were 18 conventional supermarkets; 17 generally smaller service stores featuring telephone ordering, home delivery, and charge accounts; ten Charles & Co. sandwich shops and one gourmet shop; and one liquor store. Sales came to about $105 million in 1985.

Southland sold the Gristede's and Charles & Co. stores to Red Apple Co. in 1986 for an estimated $50 million. Red Apple, owned by John A. Catsimatidis and operating in the Bronx as well as Manhattan, now became the largest supermarket chain in New York City. Gristede's and Red Apple remained distinct, however. Red Apple had completed 14 Gristede's remodels by the fall of 1987, including adding in-store delicatessens, bakeries, salad bars, hot takeout foods, and upscale cheese, prime-meat, and seafood sections. The Charles & Co. stores were closed.

=== Sloan's Supermarkets: 1956–1997 ===
Born in the Bronx and reared by foster families after his mother died, Max Sloan left school after the eighth grade to sell fruit and vegetables from a pushcart. A small vegetable and fruit store he opened in 1940 with $500 grew into the Orange Grove chain. Sloan and his partner, Lou Meyer, also ran a wholesale produce operation supplying fruits and vegetables to many grocery stores in Manhattan and the Bronx. They entered the supermarket business in 1956 with two Manhattan stores. There were 25 Sloan Supermarket Stores, mostly on Manhattan's West Side, in 1973, when the chain purchased seven more from Bohack Corporation. By this time Sloan had annual sales of $42 million.

Meyer died in 1969, and Sloan retired in 1977. His successor was a son-in-law, Jules Rose. By 1982 the 42-store Sloan's Supermarkets Inc. chain had estimated sales of $150 million a year. Its viability, Rose said, rested on seeking to market items with the greatest profit margin, such as meat, frozen items, produce, and gourmet foods. The city's consumer affairs agency had consistently listed Sloan's as one of the most expensive food chains in Manhattan. Sloan's success also rested on careful monitoring of the borough's ethnically diverse clientele. A store on the Lower East Side, for example, had a large line of Goya-brand products for Hispanics and kosher products for Orthodox Jews. Another, close to the United Nations, had full international foods sections. Located in a high-income area, it also had a higher proportion of frozen food and dairy products sales and included health and natural foods sections.

Sloan's Supermarkets had 38 stores in early 1990, when it was first reported on the auction block. Cynthia Rigg of Crain's New York Business wrote, "Over the past decade Sloan's reputation for quality has fallen dramatically. The privately held chain has done little to upgrade its stores while [its competitors] have undertaken extensive expansion and modernization programs." She also reported that industry sources said the four principals of Sloan's were "often at loggerheads, which stymies decision making." Despite its problems, Sloan's was said to hold a 20 percent share of Manhattan's grocery business.

After selling three stores to various companies in 1990, Sloan's Supermarkets sold 21 more to Red Apple during 1991–92. The acquisition had its hazards, however, because three of Sloan's owners were, in 1993, being charged with fraudulently redeeming at least $3.5 million of discount coupons clipped from newspapers, an action that threatened 15 of the acquired units with forfeiture to the federal government. The three Sloan's partners—Rose, Max Sloan's other son-in-law, and Meyer's son—eventually went to jail.

Despite these problems, Red Apple bought the remaining 11 Sloan's supermarkets—ten in Manhattan and one in Brooklyn—in 1993 for $8.8 million plus certain accounts payable. This purchase was not assigned to Red Apple itself but to Designcraft, Inc., a publicly owned shell corporation whose main stockholder was Catsimatidis. Following the sale the federal government agreed to withdraw all claims against Sloan's Supermarkets. Designcraft then took the Sloan's Supermarkets name and continued operations under Red Apple Group management.

This transaction raised the number of supermarket stores in the New York area controlled by Red Apple to 75. In 1994 the Federal Trade Commission filed a complaint, seeking the sale of ten Red Apple-controlled stores in four Manhattan neighborhoods because of possible anticompetitive effects, such as higher food prices and lower quality and selection. Supermarkets under the Red Apple, Gristede's, and Sloan's names were serving 37 percent of Manhattan's food shoppers on a regular basis, according to a survey. Catsimatidis agreed later in 1994 to divest six stores in order to settle the complaint. In 1997, however, he and three of his firms agreed to pay a $600,000 penalty for failing to comply with the FTC order. Only one of the stores had been divested, according to the agency.

The Red Apple name virtually disappeared during this period, its outlets sold to Rite Aid Corporation or converted to Gristede's or Sloan's supermarkets. Sloan's acquired three more supermarkets from a subsidiary of Red Apple Group in 1995 for $5 million plus the cost of inventory. It also opened an additional supermarket and a Brooklyn health and beauty aids store in 1996.

=== Gristede's Sloan's: 1997–1999 ===
In 1997 Sloan's Supermarkets acquired 19 Gristede's and ten Sloan's supermarkets, plus a produce distribution center, from Red Apple for $36 million worth of stock plus the assumption of $4 million in debt. The company was then renamed Gristede's Sloan's, Inc. During fiscal 1998 (the year ended November 30, 1998), Gristede's Sloan's acquired another supermarket from an affiliate of Catsimatidis and remodeled ten stores at a cost of $10 million. The company also closed four stores and combined two adjacent ones into a single store. Company sales came to $157.5 million, with a net loss of $288,339. Gristede's Sloan's had a long-term debt of $21.6 million at the end of the fiscal year. Catsimatidis, the chief executive officer, owned or controlled 91 percent of the company in February 1999.

Of the 40 Gristede's Sloan's stores in 1998, 35 were in Manhattan, one was in Brooklyn, three were in Westchester County, and one was on Long Island. They ranged from 3,200 to 23,000 square feet in selling space, with an average of 9,000, and were all leased. City Produce Operating Corp., on leased premises in the Bronx, was a warehouse operation supplying the company's supermarkets with groceries and fresh produce and selling fresh produce wholesale to third parties.

Gristede's Sloan's supermarkets were offering broad lines of merchandise, including nationally and regionally advertised brands and private-label and generic brands. Their food items included fresh meats, produce, dry groceries, dairy products, baked goods, poultry and fish, fresh fruits and vegetables, frozen foods, delicatessen items, and gourmet foods. Nonfood items included cigarettes, soaps, paper products, and health and beauty aids. The company also was operating an in-store pharmacy in one of its supermarkets. Check-cashing services were available to qualified customers, and groceries were being delivered to apartments for a small fee. The stores were open 16 hours a day, seven days a week, and on holidays. At least one was open around the clock.

Gristede's Sloan's was planning to remodel 12 more stores in fiscal 1999 and to open two new stores and four in-store pharmacies. Of the 11 stores operating under the Sloan's name, four had been converted to Gristede's by May 1999, when the company announced that the remaining seven would also take the Gristede's name by the end of the year. Catsimatidis told Supermarket News that the Gristede's banner "is a better name, with better marketing potential."

=== Expanding for the new millennium ===
In the late 1990s, Gristede's began experimenting with a lunch counter called The Café at two of its Manhattan stores. Fare included hot dogs and sandwiches, as well as more prepared entrées. In 1999 one of the Cafés began testing a sushi bar concept through a joint venture with HMC Sushi of Plainfield, New Jersey (the sushi was prepared on the premises).

The first pharmacies were installed in two Gristede's stores in 1999. They were operated under license from Legend Pharmacies, Inc., a cooperative based in Melville, New York.

The company celebrated openings of new and renovated stores through a special promotion with the New York Daily News. Gristede's gave shoppers free copies (as many as 5,000 in all) of a specially printed version of the paper, which had a full-page ad for the store on the front and back.

Gristede's had about 1,500 employees in 2000. Sales were $216.3 million. Losses were narrowed from $2.9 million to $191,000. Sales rose to $230 million in 2001 as the company managed a net profit of $275,000.

In 2002, A&P (The Great Atlantic & Pacific Tea Company) sold Gristede's three Food Emporium stores for $5.5 million. These were soon reopened under the Gristede's banner. The company was developing some of its own locations as "Mega Stores" which, at 20,000 square feet, were almost twice the size of the company's traditional buildings.

After a 20-year absence, Gristede's reentered the New Jersey market by opening more than ten supermarkets there, beginning in 2002. According to The Record, Catsimatidis was attracted to the market after researching a potential acquisition, Kings Super Markets Inc. Both chains had a similar customer base and similar approach. Gristede's was bidding against rival D'Agostino Supermarkets, Inc. to acquire Parsippany, New Jersey–based Kings Super Markets from Marks & Spencer PLC (M&S). Neither company was able to secure the necessary financing to buy the 28-unit chain, and in August 2003, M&S pulled Kings off the market.

Gristede's also opened its first store in the Bronx in November 2002. According to the New York Times, Catsimatidis was encouraged to open a supermarket in a Latino neighborhood there following the success of a store in the Washington Heights area.

To keep up with the evolving e-commerce side of the grocery business, the company launched its XpressGrocer.com site in December 2003. Gristede's also began filling orders taken through Amazon.com in November 2004. The Amazon orders were available to be shipped anywhere in the United States, not just New York.

After losing nearly $1 million in fiscal 2002, the company posted a net loss of $11.6 million on sales of $279.69 million in fiscal 2003. The loss was attributed in part to opening seven new stores during the year. The blackout on August 14–15, 2003 resulted in the loss of some perishables.

In 2004, Chairman John Catsimatidis, who owned more than 90 percent of Gristede's, took the company private. According to him, intense new regulations and the difficulty of creating investor interest for a small company (valued at $16 million) were behind the move.

== Stores ==
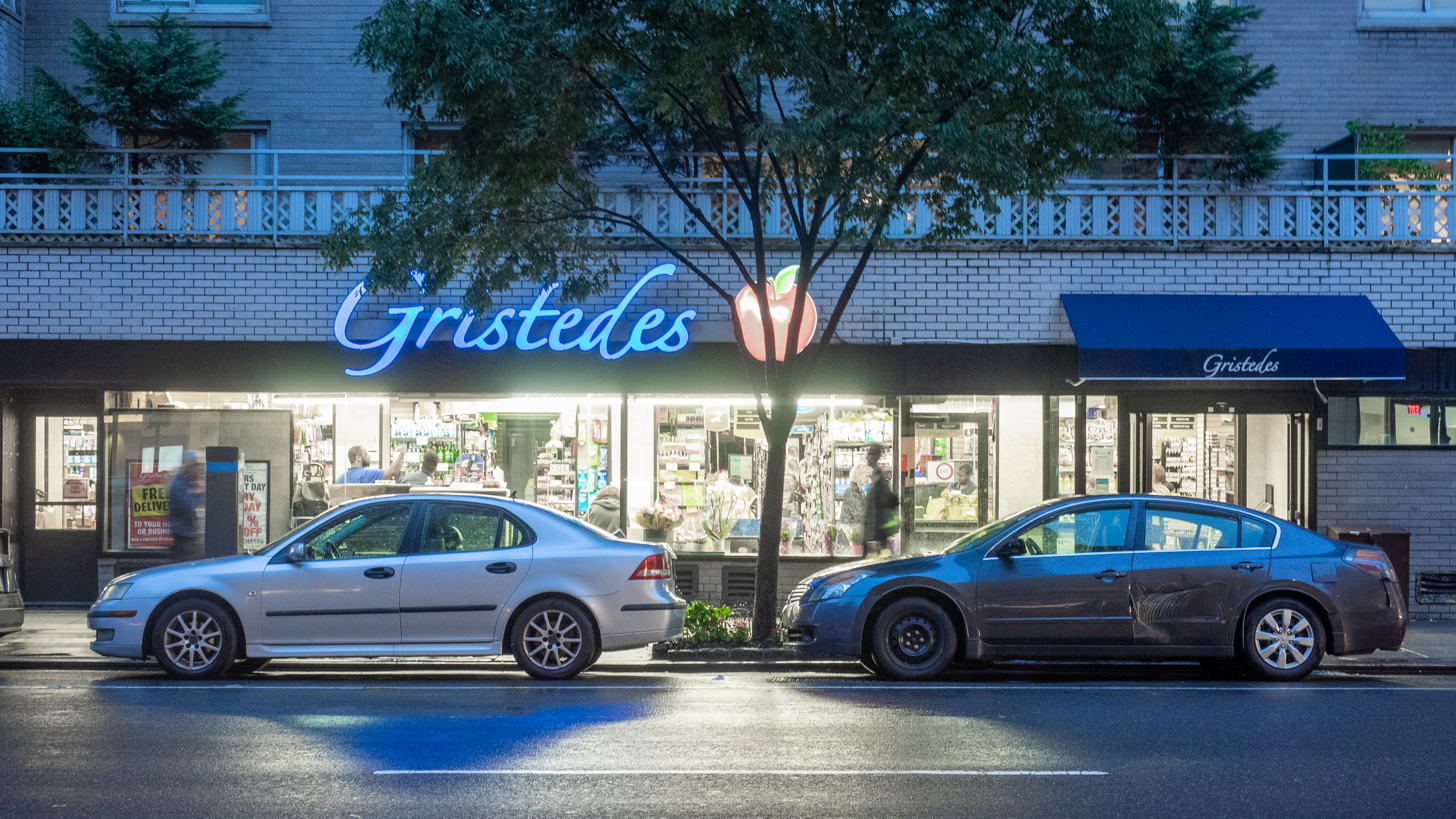
A typical Gristedes location in Manhattan.

Most Gristedes are in the borough of Manhattan, which included a Roosevelt Island location until 2020. There is also one in Brooklyn.

At one time, there was a Gristedes in the hamlet of Somers, New York; it was the farthest-north store in the chain. There was also a store in Tenafly, New Jersey, that closed in the 1980s and was replaced by a CVS Pharmacy. On Long Island, a Gristedes in Southampton closed in the late 1990s. Port Jefferson had one until the mid-1990s; Locust Valley had one until the new owner of its shopping plaza closed it in 2008. Scarsdale, New York once had a Gristedes in its Golden Horseshoe shopping plaza, until closing in the mid-2010s. At one time Gristedes also had a store in the Village of Port Chester, New York, and was located on Poningo Street, it was closed c.1970.
