= William Lynch Jr. =

American politician and political consultant (1941–2013)

William "Bill" Lynch Jr.
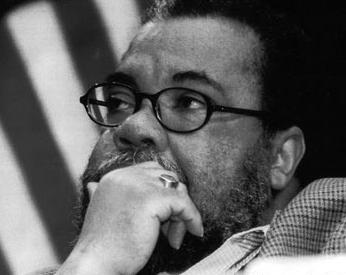

Deputy Mayor of New York City for Intergovernmental Relations
- In office January 1, 1990 – October 15, 1992
- Appointed by: David Dinkins
- Preceded by: Robert Esnard
- Succeeded by: Randy Daniels

Chief of Staff to the Manhattan Borough President
- In office January 1, 1986 – December 31, 1989
- Preceded by: Walter L. McCaffrey
- Succeeded by: Pat Roach

Personal details
- Born: July 21, 1941 New York City, New York, U.S.
- Died: August 9, 2013 (aged 72) Manhattan, New York, U.S.
- Party: Democratic
- Spouse: Mary Lynch
- Profession: Political consultant, politician, lobbyist

William "Bill" Lynch Jr. (July 21, 1941 – August 9, 2013) was an American politician and political consultant, advising politicians from the Democratic Party. He was a prominent political figure in New York politics, especially within the African-American community. In 1999, Lynch founded the political consulting firm Bill Lynch Associates, LLC (BLA), where he served as chairman from its founding until his death.

== Early life and career ==
Lynch was born on July 21, 1941, and grew up near the town of Mattituck in Suffolk County, Long Island, the son of William Lynch Sr. His father worked as a potato farmer.

In the 1960s, Lynch and his wife Mary moved to Harlem, where he would become a major political figure. Lynch worked in organized labor, rising to the position of Director of Legislation and Political Action for District Council 1701 of AFSCME.

== Campaign management ==
Lynch managed his first campaign in 1975, running Diane Lacey Winley's successful campaign for district leader in Central Harlem and the Upper West Side. The next year, Lynch would manage her campaign for the New York State Assembly. In the primary, Winley came in second place in a field of seven candidates. Nevertheless, Lynch garnered the attention of New York's African-American politicians.

With connections to labor organizations and black elected officials, Lynch became known as a coalition builder adept at bringing African-Americans into the political process. Not wanting to be in the spotlight, Lynch preferred to work behind the scenes.

During the 1980s, Lynch worked on presidential campaigns in all three election cycles: Senator Edward M. Kennedy in 1980, Reverend Jesse Jackson and Walter Mondale in 1984, and Jackson again in 1988. In 1985, Lynch managed the successful New York State Senate campaign of David Paterson, who later served as governor of New York.

From 1985 to 1989, Lynch served as Chief of Staff to then-Manhattan Borough President David Dinkins.

== 1989 mayoral election ==
Lynch served as campaign manager for Dinkins's mayoral bid in 1989. Dinkins defeated incumbent mayor Ed Koch in the Democratic primary, then went on to win the general election over Republican Rudolph W. Giuliani, becoming New York's first African-American mayor. Lynch was credited as being largely responsible for the victory by forging a broad multi-ethnic coalition, later dubbed the "Dinkins coalition."

Having a disdain for formal attire and earning respect for his political acumen, Lynch earned the nickname "The Rumpled Genius."

== Dinkins Administration ==
In the administration, Lynch served as Deputy Mayor for Intergovernmental Relations, but his longstanding relationship with Dinkins made him the de facto chief aide and adviser. Despite health concerns, Lynch regularly worked 15-hour days. "I get a little emotional when I talk about Bill Lynch. He works like hell," said Dinkins.

Dinkins entered office at a time of major fiscal problems and high crime rates in New York City. The administration also faced criticism as being in disarray owing to reports of a poor chain of command and turf wars among deputy mayors. Complaints abounded that Dinkins was not doing enough to implement his campaign promises.

During Lynch's tenure, the administration faced the racially polarizing Crown Heights Riot. Lynch would dedicate so much time to reducing racial tensions between Jews and African-Americans that Mayor Dinkins had to cancel a planned delegation to South Africa, unable to raise the needed funds. The press took it as another sign of Dinkins's weak leadership. In 1993, a report to Governor Mario Cuomo, while overall supporting the administration's handling of the riot, asserted that Lynch and two others withheld information from the mayor about violence in Crown Heights. Lynch denied the accusations.

Nevertheless, Lynch also received credit for some of the administration's major accomplishments, including Dinkins's speech on racial harmony, bringing the 1992 Democratic National Convention to New York, and organizing the New York welcome ceremony for Nelson Mandela.

Sources said Lynch was frustrated that his work was not producing enough results. In 1992 he resigned from the administration to serve as New York State deputy director for Bill Clinton's presidential campaign. Lynch never formally returned to the administration, instead becoming the campaign director for Dinkins's reelection campaign. Lynch would also never again serve in public office, preferring to influence government from the outside.

In 1993, Dinkins lost his re-election bid to Rudolph Giuliani.

== Campaign adviser and private sector ==
During the 1990s, Lynch would advise various Democratic politicians and candidates, including Mario Cuomo and Charles B. Rangel. Lynch also advised Nelson Mandela during South Africa's transition from apartheid and 1994 elections. He was named a co-chair of the Democratic National Committee in 1997.

In 1995 Lynch became Vice President of MacAndrews & Forbes Holdings.

== Consulting firm ==
In 1999, Lynch formed his own political consulting firm, Bill Lynch Associates, LLC (BLA). Based in New York City, the firm advises Democratic campaigns and politicians; and provides lobbying and consulting services to corporations.

BLA has advised numerous political campaigns, primarily in the New York Area. Past campaigns have included H. Carl McCall's 2002 gubernatorial bid; Fernando Ferrer's mayoral bids in 2001 and 2005; and Hillary Clinton's campaigns for senate (both 2000 and 2006) and president. Corporate clients have included Nielsen Media Research and Columbia University.

In 2004, John Kerry enlisted Lynch to be a co-chair of his presidential campaign, a move viewed partially as a means to quell criticism that the campaign inner circle lacked diversity.

Leading up to the 2008 Democratic presidential primary, Lynch was planning to advise then-Senator Hillary Clinton, having already advised her in the past. However, some doubt emerged when then-Senator Barack Obama entered the race and courted him, though Lynch ultimately sided with Clinton.

In New York City's 2009 citywide elections, BLA advised candidates for all three citywide offices: Bill Thompson for mayor, Eric Gioia for public advocate, and John Liu for comptroller. BLA also advised the campaign of Cyrus Vance Jr. for New York County (Manhattan) District Attorney, and Inez Dickens in her re-election bid for New York City Council. In the end, Vance, Liu, and Dickens won their respective races. Thompson won the Democratic mayoral primary but lost to incumbent Michael Bloomberg, while Gioia failed to win the public advocate Democratic primary.

In the 2009 election cycle, Lynch and his staff primarily earned media attention for their handling of Vance and Liu's campaigns, which BLA had a greater role in managing than its other clients, because both won hotly contested primaries. BLA's management of John Liu's campaign earned particular attention, owing to the broad multi-ethnic coalition formed to elect him, which pundits such as Errol Louis and Dominic Carter likened to a revival of the Dinkins coalition.

BLA also consulted with Congressman Charles B. Rangel on an ongoing basis and advised him during the controversy over his finances. It advised Governor David Paterson in his bid for a full term as governor of New York.

== Personal life and death ==
Lynch was married to Mary Lynch and has two children, William Lynch III and Stacy. He died on August 9, 2013, of complications related to kidney disease. Many obituary writers made reference to his nickname in the press: The Rumpled Genius.

In July 2022, Lynch's daughter, Stacy Lynch, was named Chief of Staff to New York Governor Kathy Hochul.

== See also ==
- Paterson, David Black, Blind, & In Charge: A Story of Visionary Leadership and Overcoming Adversity. New York, New York, 2020
