= 2009 New York City Comptroller election =

2009 New York City comptroller election
- November 3, 2009
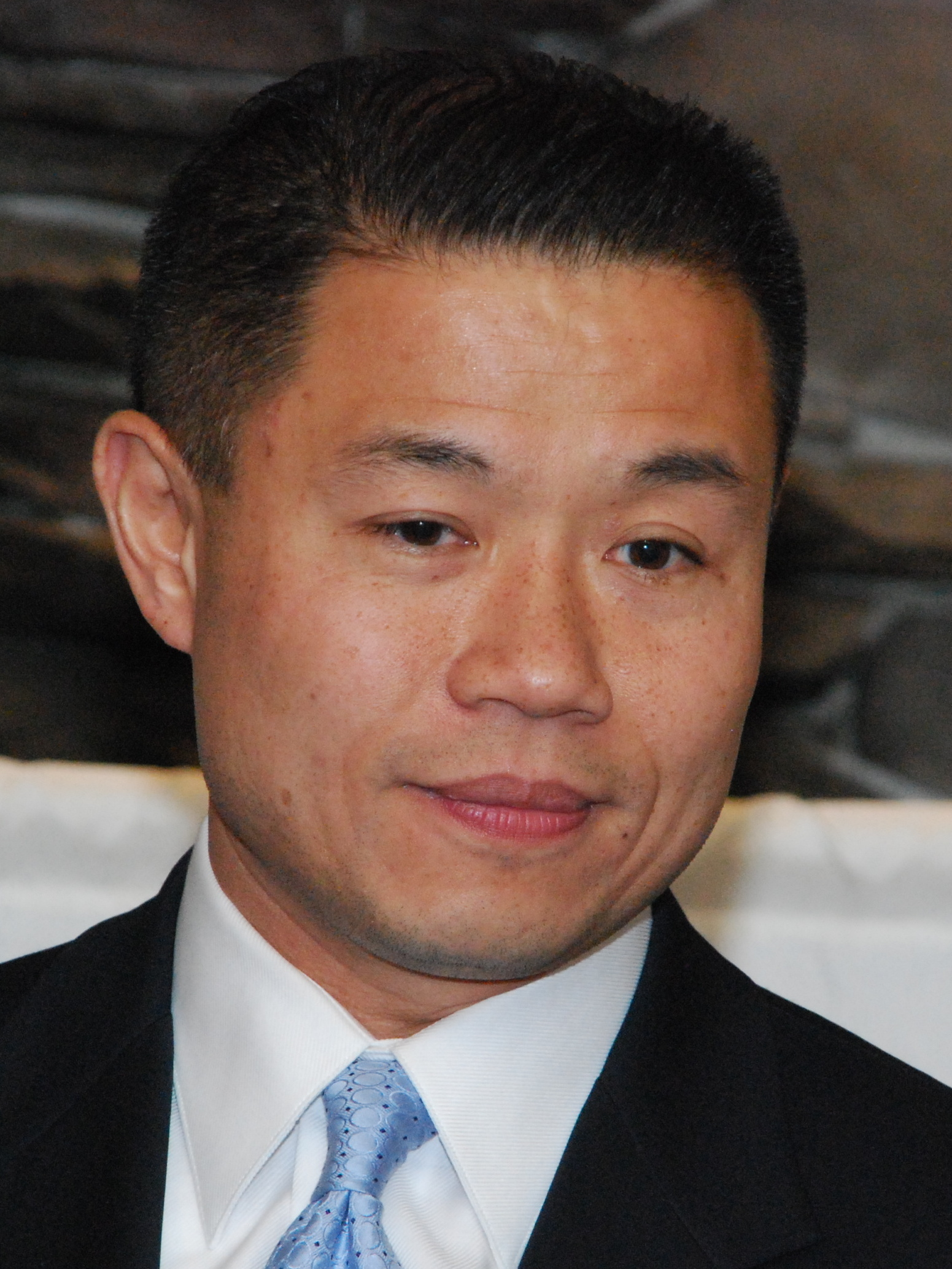

Candidate	John Liu	Joe Mendola
Party	Democratic	Republican
Alliance	Working Families
Popular vote	750,334	185,056
Percentage	76.9%	19.0%
- Liu: 50–60% 60–70% 70–80% 80–90% >90% Mendola: 40–50% 50–60%
Comptroller before election
Bill Thompson
Democratic
Elected Comptroller
John C. Liu
Democratic

The 2009 election for New York City Comptroller was held on November 3, 2009, to coincide with the 2009 mayoral election to determine who would serve as New York City Comptroller. The Democratic and Republican primaries were held on September 15, 2009. There was a run-off election for the Democratic Party nomination on September 29, 2009.

Joe Mendola was nominated as the Republican candidate. John Liu was nominated as the candidate of the Democratic Party; he was also on the Working Families Party line in November. Liu won the race and was elected Comptroller, becoming the first Asian American to be elected to a citywide office.

== Democratic nomination ==
Four candidates sought the Democratic Party nomination.

They were:

- Melinda Katz, City Council member and former State Assemblywoman
- John Liu, City Council member
- David Weprin, City Council member and former Deputy Superintendent of the New York State Banking Commission
- David Yassky, City Council member

In March 2009, Liu announced that he was running for the post of New York City Comptroller. As part of this bid, Liu donated $10,000 to the Working Families Party; they endorsed him less than 6 months later. Liu raised $3 million for his political run, more than his competitors.

Beginning in May, Liu picked up several endorsements. The Village Independent Democrats, The Queens County Democratic organization, the local Americans for Democratic Action chapter and the Working Families Party, 1199 SEIU union local and the Uniformed Firefighters Association endorsed him. On September 1, the United Federation of Teachers endorsed Liu.

=== Primary election ===
2009 New York City comptroller election democratic primary debates
No.	Date	Host	Moderator	Link	Democratic	Democratic	Democratic	Democratic
Key: P Participant A Absent N Not invited I Invited W Withdrawn								
Key: P Participant A Absent N Not invited I Invited W Withdrawn					Melinda Katz	John Liu	David Weprin	David Yassky
1	Aug. 23, 2009	League of Women Voters of New York City; New York City Campaign Finance Board; WINS (AM); WXTV-DT	Diana Williams	YouTube	P	P	P	P
2	Sep. 10, 2009	Citizens Union; New York One; New York One Noticias; New York Daily News; New York City Campaign Finance Board; Time Warner Cable; WNYC-FM	Dominic Carter	YouTube	P	P	P	P

In the September 15 Democratic primary, Liu was the front-runner, ending up with 133,986 votes, or 38 percent of the vote.

=== Run-off election ===
2009 New York City comptroller election democratic primary run-off debate
No.	Date	Host	Moderator	Link	Democratic	Democratic
Key: P Participant A Absent N Not invited I Invited W Withdrawn						
Key: P Participant A Absent N Not invited I Invited W Withdrawn					John Liu	David Yassky
1	Sep. 24, 2009	New York One; New York One Noticias; New York Daily News; New York City Campaign Finance Board; Time Warner Cable; WNYC-FM	Diana Williams	YouTube	P	P

Because he did not manage to reach 40 percent of the vote, a run-off election was required between Liu and runner-up Yassky, who received 30 percent of the vote in the primary. The Daily News wrote that Yassky and Liu slung mud in a spirited debate on September 24, 2009. On September 29, Liu won the run-off by taking 55.6% of the vote against Yassky.

== Republican nomination ==
One candidate sought the Republican Party nomination.

- Joe Mendola

== Polling ==
Source	Sample size	Date	Katz	Liu	Weprin	Yassky	Undecided
SurveyUSA	2,200	August 14–18, 2009	22%	23%	12%	15%	28%

== Election returns ==
=== Democratic primary election ===
First round, Tuesday, September 15, 2009

Results by State Assembly district Liu: 30%–40%; 40%–50%; 50%–60%; 60%–70%; Yassky: 20%–30%; 30%–40%; 40%–50%; 50%–60%; Katz: 30%–40%; 40%–50%; Weprin: 40%–50%

2009 Democratic Primary	Manhattan	The Bronx	Brooklyn	Queens	Staten; Island	Total	%
John C. Liu	36,625	18,888	42,727	37,658	4,458	140,356	37.8%
John C. Liu	32.9%	42.5%	36.8%	43.2%	37.0%	140,356	37.8%
David Yassky	44,272	9,882	40,775	16,671	3,162	114,762	30.9%
David Yassky	39.8%	22.2%	35.1%	19.1%	26.3%	114,762	30.9%
Melinda Katz	21,143	11,400	20,115	20,211	3,342	76,211	20.5%
Melinda Katz	19.0%	25.6%	17.3%	23.2%	27.8%	76,211	20.5%
David I. Weprin	9,223	4,285	12,366	12,630	1,077	39,581	10.7%
David I. Weprin	8.3%	9.6%	10.7%	14.5%	8.9%	39,581	10.7%
all Write-Ins	14	5	75	10	4	108	0.03%
T O T A L	111,277	44,460	116,058	87,180	12,043	371,018	

Most (about 65) of the 108 write-in votes were for Salim Ejaz, over 40 of which were cast in Brooklyn.

=== Democratic primary run-off election ===
As no candidate had received 40% of the Democratic vote for this office in the September 15 primary, a run-off election between the two most-popular candidates was held on Tuesday, September 29, 2009.

Results by State Assembly district Liu: 50%–60%; 60%–70%; 70%–80%; 80%–90%; Yassky: 50%–60%; 60%–70%; 70%–80%

2009 Democratic Run-off Primary	Manhattan	The Bronx	Brooklyn	Queens	Staten; Island	Total	%
John C. Liu	36,906	18,019	43,120	33,237	3,818	135,100	56.0%
John C. Liu	47.6%	65.2%	57.1%	62.0%	55.6%	135,100	56.0%
David Yassky	40,644	9,633	32,391	20,391	3,047	106,106	44.0%
David Yassky	52.4%	34.8%	42.9%	38.0%	44.4%	106,106	44.0%
T O T A L	77,550	27,652	75,511	53,628	6,865	241,206	

=== General election ===
2009 New York City comptroller election debate
No.	Date	Host	Moderator	Link	Democratic	Rent Is Too Damn High
Key: P Participant A Absent N Not invited I Invited W Withdrawn						
Key: P Participant A Absent N Not invited I Invited W Withdrawn					John Liu	Salim Ejaz
1	Oct. 18, 2009	League of Women Voters of New York City; New York City Campaign Finance Board; WABC-TV; WXTV-DT	Diana Williams	C-SPAN	P	P

John Liu won the general election held on Tuesday, November 3, 2009.

2009 general election	party	Manhattan	The Bronx	Brooklyn	Queens	Staten Island	Total	%
John C. Liu	Democratic	191,748	95,795	203,499	180,249	33,242	704,533	72.2%
John C. Liu	Working Families Party	12,635	3,404	18,641	8,811	2,310	45,801	4.7%
John C. Liu	Total	204,383	99,199	222,140	189,060	35,552	750,334	76.9%
John C. Liu	Total	81.0%	83.7%	80.0%	73.5%	50.5%	750,334	76.9%
Joseph A. Mendola	Republican	39,103	15,166	43,718	57,266	29,803	185,056	19.0%
Joseph A. Mendola	Republican	15.5%	12.8%	15.7%	22.3%	42.3%	185,056	19.0%
Stuart Avrick	Conservative	3,325	2,119	6,439	6,818	3,930	22,631	2.3%
Stuart Avrick	Conservative	1.3%	1.8%	2.3%	2.7%	5.6%	22,631	2.3%
Salim Ejaz	Rent Is Too High	3,614	1,569	3,422	2,607	691	11,903	1.2%
John Clifton	Libertarian	2,022	525	1,946	1,488	389	6,370	0.7%
Total Write-ins		15	7	20	14	10	66	0.01%
Total Votes		252,462	118,585	277,685	257,253	70,375	976,360	

Source: Board of Elections in the City of New York

== See also ==
- New York City Comptroller
- Government of New York City
- New York City mayoral election, 2009
- New York City Public Advocate election, 2009
