= 2009 New York City Public Advocate election =

- November 3, 2009
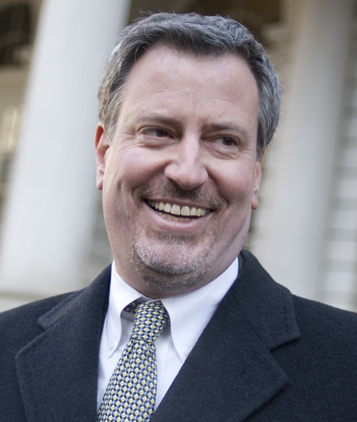

Candidate	Bill de Blasio	Alex T. Zablocki
Party	Democratic	Republican
Popular vote	724,629	164,090
Percentage	77.6%	17.6%
- de Blasio: 40–50% 50–60% 60–70% 70–80% 80–90% >90% Zablocki: 50–60%
Public Advocate before election
Betsy Gotbaum
Democratic
Elected Public Advocate
Bill de Blasio
Democratic

The 2009 New York City Public Advocate election took place on Tuesday, November 3, 2009, along with elections for the mayor, the city comptroller, borough presidents, and members of the New York City Council. The Democratic candidate, Bill de Blasio, won election with 77% of the vote against 18% for the Republican nominee, Alex Zablocki, 3.6% for the Conservative nominee, William Lee, and 1.7% for two others.

The public advocate has the formal role of presiding over meetings of the New York City Council (although the Speaker elected by the Council itself now does much of this work), and, until the next election, would serve as acting Mayor whenever the elected Mayor is unable to serve.

This election has drawn significant interest from politicians looking to advance their careers, as the extension of New York City term limits allows more incumbents to seek reelection.

== Candidates ==
=== Democratic party ===
Despite the extension of term limits in late 2008, the outgoing public advocate, Betsy Gotbaum announced that she would not run for reelection.

Candidates included Councilman Eric Gioia of Queens, who has raised $2.5 million for the campaign; Norman Siegel, the civil liberties lawyer who lost in a runoff to Gotbaum in 2001; former public advocate Mark Green, and Councilman Bill de Blasio of Brooklyn.

After acknowledging he was considering the race in December 2008, Green announced on February 10, 2009, that he would again run for the office. Green was Gotbaum's predecessor as public advocate and the first person to hold this title. His entry changed the landscape of the race, due to his name recognition and ability to raise money.

Councilman John Liu, also from Queens, had been considered a potential candidate for advocate, but he ran for and won the office of New York City Comptroller—an office uncontested by the current city comptroller, Bill Thompson, who preferred to seek election as mayor in 2009. Councilwoman Jessica Lappin and Guillermo Linares, a former councilman and current commissioner of the Mayor's Office of Immigrant Affairs, were also considering a run Assemblyman Adam Clayton Powell IV was also considered a potential candidate. Lappin decided not to run. Imtiaz S. Syed, a lawyer, economist, investigative accountant, banker, administrator and management consultant, also ran.

On September 15, 2009, de Blasio won 32.6% of the Democratic primary vote and Green 31.5%. (Most of the remaining 36% of the primary voters cast their ballots for Gioia or Siegel.) Neither de Blasio nor Green won enough votes (40%) to avoid a run-off primary election between them two weeks later.

On September 29, Bill de Blasio won that run-off election by 62.4% to 37.6% for Mark Green. Turnout was very light, about 220,000 or 10% of the eligible voters, according to The Associated Press. (In the same run-off election, John Liu led his fellow City Councilman David Yassky, of Brooklyn, for the Democratic nomination for New York City Comptroller by 56% to 44% of a similar turnout.)

=== Debates ===
2009 New York City public advocate election democratic primary debates
No.	Date	Host	Moderator	Link	Democratic	Democratic	Democratic	Democratic
Key: P Participant A Absent N Not invited I Invited W Withdrawn								
Key: P Participant A Absent N Not invited I Invited W Withdrawn					Bill de Blasio	Eric Gioia	Mark Green	Norman Siegel
1	Aug. 23, 2009	1010 WINS; League of Women Voters of New York City; New York City Campaign Finance Board; WABC-TV; WXTV-DT	Diana Williams	YouTube	P	P	P	P
2	Sep. 9, 2009	Citizens Union; New York One; New York One Noticias; New York Daily News; New York City Campaign Finance Board; Time Warner Cable; WNYC-FM	Dominic Carter	YouTube	P	P	P	P

2009 New York City public advocate election democratic primary run-off debate
No.	Date	Host	Moderator	Link	Democratic	Democratic
Key: P Participant A Absent N Not invited I Invited W Withdrawn						
Key: P Participant A Absent N Not invited I Invited W Withdrawn					Bill de Blasio	Mark Green
1	Sep. 23, 2009	New York One; New York One Noticias; New York Daily News; New York City Campaign Finance Board; Time Warner Cable; WNYC-FM	Dominic Carter	YouTube	P	P

=== Republican party ===
Alex Zablocki, an aide to State Senator Andrew Lanza of Staten Island, declared his candidacy. At 26 years old, Zablocki was the youngest candidate to run for public advocate. This also marked the first time since 1997 that the Republican party nominated a candidate for this office.

=== Other parties ===
- William Lee, Conservative Party of New York
- Maura DeLuca, Socialist Workers Party
- Jim Lesczynski, Libertarian Party of New York

== Campaign ==
Gotbaum set up meetings with each of her potential successors in order to help them understand the position. On March 30, 2009, Alex Zablocki, Republican candidate for public advocate, met with Gotbaum in her office for about an hour to discuss the importance of the office and afterwards thanked her for her service.

On March 10, Fordham Law School hosted a town hall meeting with Gioia, Siegel, de Blasio and Green. Zablocki was not invited, which he considered an "outrage". The organizer said that he believed students wanted to see the Democratic contenders first, and wished to set up a debate including Zablocki in the future.

=== Endorsements ===
De Blasio was endorsed by The New York Times, the Working Families Party, and over 150 elected officials and organizations. Gioia was endorsed by various labor unions, including Local One of the Stagehands, the Sergeants Benevolent Association (SBA) and the Captains Endowment Association (CEA). Alex Zablocki was endorsed by all five Republican county organizations in New York City, led by his home borough of Staten Island. Alex Zablocki was also endorsed by the Staten Island Advance on October 30, 2009, as well as The Wave, Rockaway's leading newspaper, on October 23, 2009.

== Results ==
=== Democratic primary ===
Tuesday, September 15, 2009

Results by State Assembly district De Blasio: 20%–30%; 30%–40%; 40%–50%; 50%–60%; 60%–70%; Green: 30%–40%; 40%–50%; Gioia: 30%–40%; 40%–50%; 50%–60%

Official results from the New York City Board of Elections as of September 25, 2009:

2009 Democratic initial primary	Manhattan	The Bronx	Brooklyn	Queens	Staten Island	Total	%
Bill de Blasio	35,013	16,662	47,791	17,054	2,947	119,467	32.6%
Bill de Blasio	31.7%	36.7%	41.3%	20.5%	24.6%	119,467	32.6%
Mark Green	34,601	14,426	33,790	28,480	4,211	115,508	31.5%
Mark Green	31.3%	31.8%	29.2%	34.2%	35.1%	115,508	31.5%
Eric Gioia	17,309	6,859	15,082	24,838	2,771	66,859	18.2%
Eric Gioia	15.7%	15.1%	13.0%	29.8%	23.1%	66,859	18.2%
Norman Siegel	20,246	5,745	14,335	10,135	1,759	52,220	14.2%
Norman Siegel	18.3%	12.7%	12.4%	12.2%	14.7%	52,220	14.2%
Imtiaz S. Syed	3,221	1,679	4,750	2,875	295	12,820	3.5%
Imtiaz S. Syed	2.9%	3.7%	4.1%	3.4%	2.5%	12,820	3.5%
all write-in votes	14	1	18	10	0	43	0.01%
T O T A L	110,404	45,372	115,766	83,392	11,983	366,917	

As no candidate reached 40%, a runoff election for de Blasio and Green set for September 29 was required.

=== Democratic run-off primary ===
Tuesday, September 29, 2009

Results by State Assembly district De Blasio: 50%–60%; 60%–70%; 70%–80%; Green: 50%–60%

Official returns (as reported on October 20, 2009):

2009 Democratic run-off primary	Manhattan	The Bronx	Brooklyn	Queens	Richmond [Staten Is.]	Total	%
Bill de Blasio	46,295	17,074	49,667	28,450	3,927	145,413	62.4%
Bill de Blasio	61.4%	61.7%	67.6%	57.0%	58.0%	145,413	62.4%
Mark Green	29,121	10,589	23,814	21,429	2,840	87,793	37.6%
Mark Green	38.6%	38.3%	32.4%	43.0%	42.0%	87,793	37.6%
T O T A L	75,416	27,663	73,481	49,879	6,767	233,206	

Bill de Blasio became the Democratic nominee for public advocate.

=== General election ===
Tuesday, November 3, 2009

2009 general election	Party	Manhattan	The Bronx	Brooklyn	Queens	Staten Island	Total	%
Bill de Blasio	Democratic	183,917	92,022	205,155	166,119	32,153	679,366	72.7%
Bill de Blasio	Working Families	12,608	3,434	18,602	8,215	2,404	45,263	4.8%
Bill de Blasio	Total	196,525	95,456	223,757	174,334	34,557	724,629	77.6%
Bill de Blasio	Total	81.5%	84.9%	81.7%	73.2%	50.5%	724,629	77.6%
Alex T. Zablocki	Republican	35,515	13,013	37,683	49,988	27,891	164,090	17.6%
Alex T. Zablocki	Republican	14.7%	11.6%	13.8%	21.0%	40.7%	164,090	17.6%
William J. Lee	Conservative	4,929	2,902	8,737	10,523	5,185	32,276	3.5%
William J. Lee	Conservative	2.0%	2.6%	3.2%	4.4%	7.6%	32,276	3.5%
Maura de Luca	Socialist Workers	2,455	788	2,555	2,029	478	8,305	0.9%
Jim Lesczynski	Libertarian	1,812	268	1,223	1,138	367	4,808	0.5%
Total write-ins		37	17	30	29	10	123	0.01%
Total votes		241,273	112,444	273,985	238,041	68,488	934,231	

Source: Board of Elections in the City of New York http://www.vote.nyc.ny.us/results.html

Bill de Blasio was elected public advocate.

== See also ==
- New York City Public Advocate
- Government of New York City
- 2009 New York City mayoral election
- 2009 New York City Comptroller election
