= Norman Siegel =

American lawyer

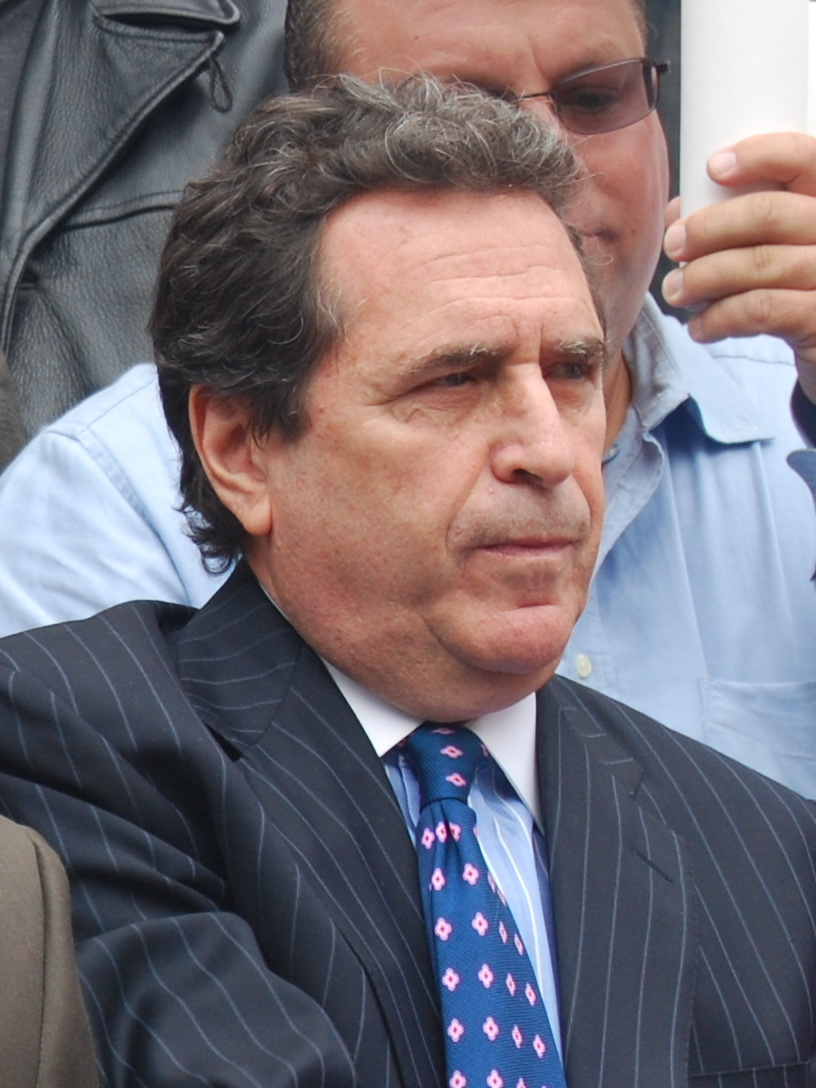
- Norman Siegel at City Hall; New York City, 2008
- Born: November 21, 1943 (age 82)
- Education: Brooklyn College; NYU Law School
- Occupation: civil rights attorney
- Known for: former executive of the NYCLU

Norman Siegel (born November 21, 1943) is the former executive director of the New York Civil Liberties Union (NYCLU), New York's leading civil rights organization, under the umbrella of the nationwide American Civil Liberties Union (ACLU), as well as a former candidate for Public Advocate in New York City and a noted civil rights attorney.

== Early life and education ==
Siegel was born on November 21, 1943, in Brooklyn, New York, to Benjamin and Sydelle Siegel. He has three siblings. After graduating from New Utrecht High School, Siegel attended Brooklyn College and NYU Law School with Rudy Giuliani, who later became mayor of New York City and NYCLU's frequent courtroom opponent.

== Career ==
Siegel served as Field Director of NYCLU from 1973 to 1976, and then as its Executive Director from 1985 to 2000. Early in his legal career, he also worked for MFY Legal Services and for the Youth Citizenship Fund.

Since ending his work at the NYCLU, Siegel has entered private practice and has represented various activist groups including RodStarz and G1 of Rebel Diaz, Critical Mass, residents fighting the expansion of Columbia University and families against the Rudy Giuliani's 2008 campaign for President of the United States. He has also frequently written op-ed columns at major New York City newspapers, such as the New York Times, Newsday, the New York Daily News, and the Amsterdam News. Siegel has taught a class at New Utrecht High School in Brooklyn, New York and has served on the boards of many foundations.

In 2001, Siegel ran for New York City Public Advocate and lost to Betsy Gotbaum in a runoff. In 2005, he ran again, but was likewise unsuccessful. He was again a candidate in the 2009 election, losing in the Democratic primary to Bill de Blasio. In 2010, Siegel negotiated a settlement with New York City, ensuring that online journalists would receive access to official press credentials.

In 2012, Siegel, along with colleagues Herbert Teitelbaum, Saralee Evans and Emily Jane Goodman, formed a new law firm, Siegel Teitelbaum & Evans, LLP. The firm handles a wide variety of legal issues.

In 2014, Siegel was quoted in the New York Times as saying that his law firm would monitor the cab company SheTaxis for gender discrimination and, if asked, consider filing a claim against them. The company allows women customers to request women cab drivers; parties must include a woman to request specifically a female driver. A customer is quoted in the article as saying she uses the cab service in order to avoid riding with "intimidating" male drivers, particularly late at night. It is reported that Siegel had previously supported legal opposition to women-only gyms. Such gyms are increasingly frequented by women who wish to exercise without fear of sexual harassment.

In 2015 Siegel joined YAFFED in bringing a lawsuit against 40 yeshivas, private Jewish schools, for inadequate secular studies.
