= Bill de Blasio =

Mayor of New York City from 2014 to 2021

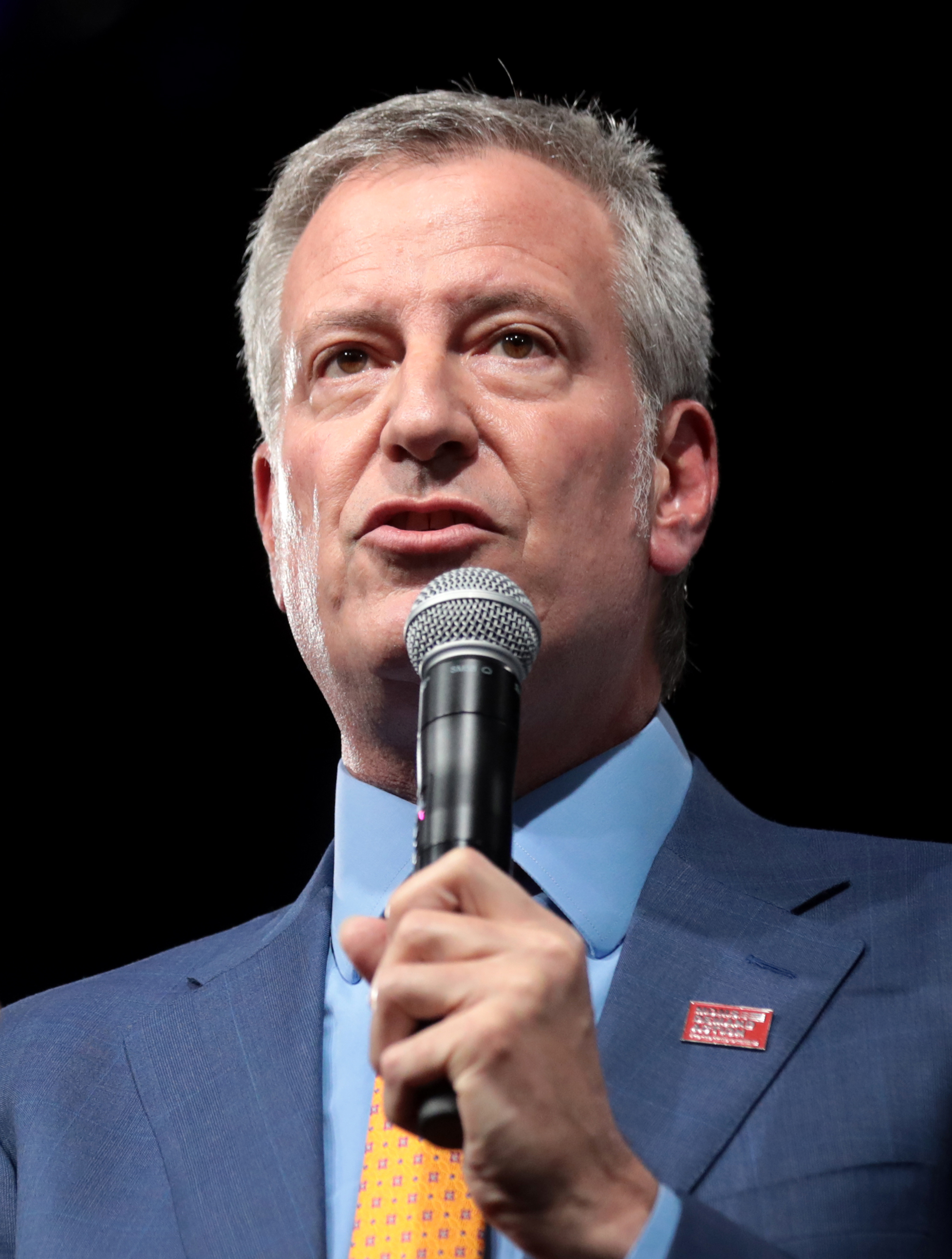
- De Blasio in 2019

110th Mayor of New York City
- In office January 1, 2014 – December 31, 2021
- First Deputy: Anthony Shorris (2014–2017); Dean Fuleihan (2018–2021)
- Preceded by: Michael Bloomberg
- Succeeded by: Eric Adams

3rd New York City Public Advocate
- In office January 1, 2010 – December 31, 2013
- Preceded by: Betsy Gotbaum
- Succeeded by: Letitia James

Member of the New York City Council from the 39th district
- In office January 1, 2002 – December 31, 2009
- Preceded by: Stephen DiBrienza
- Succeeded by: Brad Lander

Personal details
- Born: Warren Wilhelm Jr. May 8, 1961 (age 65) Manhattan, New York, U.S.
- Party: Democratic
- Spouse: Chirlane McCray (m. 1994; sep. 2023)
- Children: 2
- Education: New York University (BA); Columbia University (MIA)

Bill de Blasio (Note: /dɪˈblɑːzioʊ/ dib-LAH-zee-oh) (born Warren Wilhelm Jr., May 8, 1961) is an American former politician who served as the 110th mayor of New York City from 2014 to 2021. A member of the Democratic Party, he held the office of New York City Public Advocate from 2010 to 2013.

De Blasio was born in Manhattan and was raised primarily in Cambridge, Massachusetts. He graduated from New York University and Columbia University before brief stints working as a campaign manager for Charles Rangel and Hillary Clinton. De Blasio started his career as an elected official on the New York City Council, representing the 39th district in Brooklyn from 2002 to 2009. After one term as public advocate, he was elected mayor of New York City in 2013. De Blasio was reelected mayor in 2017.

De Blasio called attention to what he described as stark economic inequality in New York City, which he described as a "tale of two cities" during his first campaign. He supported socially liberal and progressive policies. In his first term as mayor, he implemented a free universal pre-kindergarten program in the city. De Blasio's other policy initiatives included the ThriveNYC mental health program, new de-escalation training for police officers, reduced prosecutions for cannabis possession, and ending the post-9/11 surveillance program of Muslim residents. De Blasio was term-limited and ineligible to seek a third term in the 2021 New York City mayoral election. He was succeeded by Eric Adams on January 1, 2022.

De Blasio ran in the Democratic primaries for the 2020 presidential election. After registering low poll numbers and failing to qualify for the third round of primary debates, he suspended his campaign on September 20, 2019. In 2022, he ran for the U.S. House of Representatives in the newly redrawn 10th congressional district, but withdrew his candidacy prior to the Democratic primary.

== Early life, family and education ==
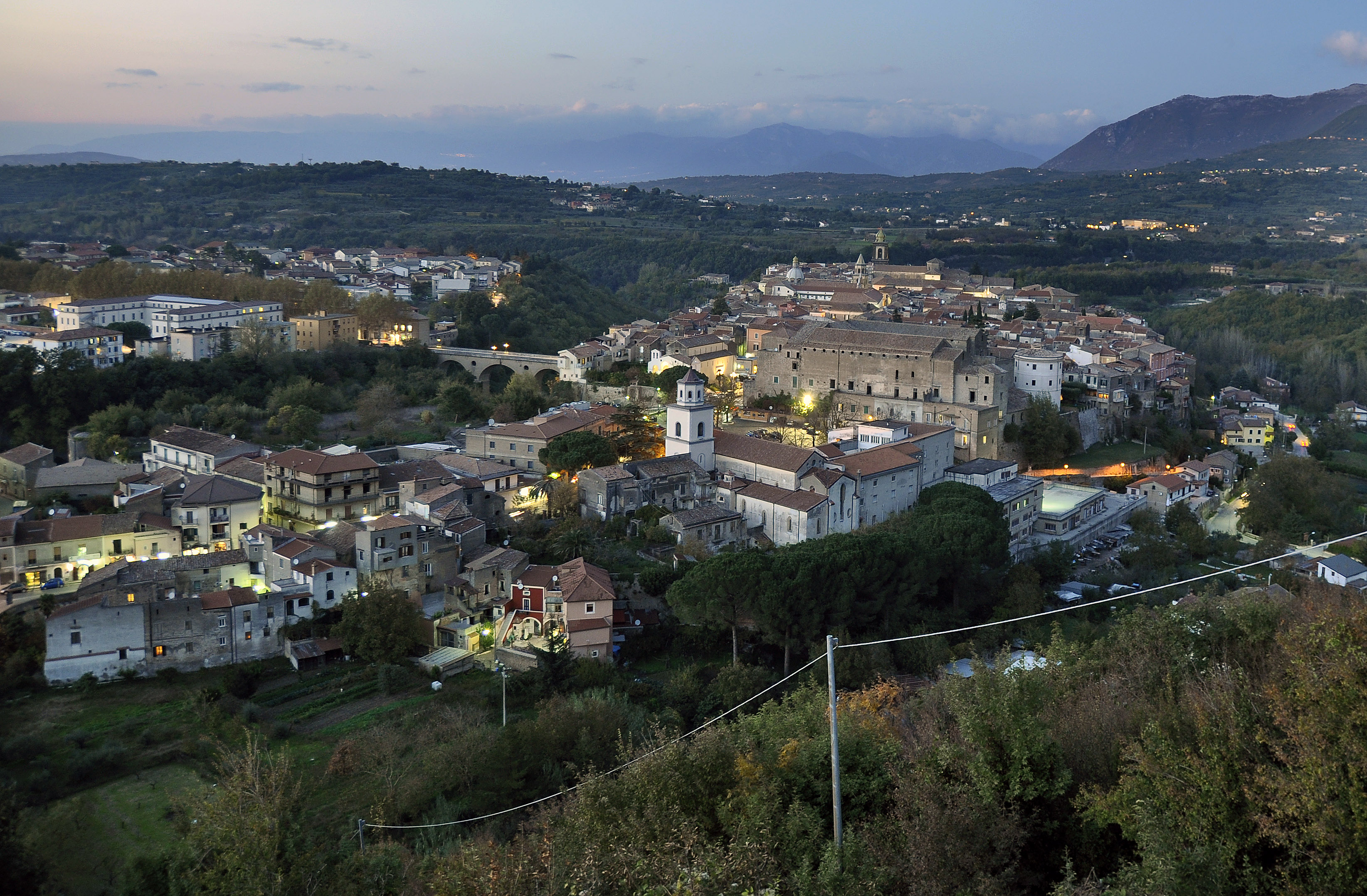
De Blasio's maternal grandfather came from Sant'Agata de' Goti, Italy

Bill de Blasio was born Warren Wilhelm Jr. on May 8, 1961. While he did not grow up in New York City, his parents drove from their home in Norwalk, Connecticut, to Manhattan's Doctors Hospital for his birth. He is the third son of Warren Wilhelm (1917–1979) and Maria Angela (née de Blasio; 1917–2007). He changed his name to Warren de Blasio-Wilhelm in 1983 and to Bill de Blasio in 2001 to honor his maternal family and to reflect his alienation from his father. He has two older brothers, Steven and Donald. His mother was of Italian heritage, and his father was of German, English, French, and Scots-Irish ancestry. His paternal grandparents were Donald Wilhelm of Ohio, and Nina (née Warren) from Iowa. His maternal grandfather, Giovanni, was from Sant'Agata de' Goti, Campania, and his grandmother, Anna (née Briganti), was from Grassano, Basilicata. His paternal uncle, Donald George Wilhelm Jr., worked for the Central Intelligence Agency in Iran and ghostwrote the memoir of Mohammad Reza Pahlavi, the last shah of Iran.

His mother, Maria de Blasio, attended Smith College, served in the U.S. Office of War Information during World War II and authored The Other Italy: The Italian Resistance in World War II (1988). His father, a Yale University graduate, worked as a contributing editor at Time. In 1942, he enlisted in the U.S. Army during World War II. During the 82-day Battle of Okinawa, a grenade detonated below his left foot, and his leg was later amputated below the knee. After receiving a Purple Heart, he married Maria in 1945, and became a budget analyst for the federal government. During the 1950s, at the height of the Red Scare, both Maria and Warren were accused of having a "sympathetic interest in Communism". The family moved to Connecticut; Warren was chief international economist for Texaco and Maria worked in public relations at the Italian consulate.

In 1966, the family moved to Cambridge, Massachusetts after Warren was offered a job at management consulting group Arthur D. Little, and Bill began kindergarten. Bill and his brother Donald then grew up with Maria and her extended family. Of his early childhood, de Blasio said: "My mother and father broke up very early on in the time I came along, and I was brought up by my mother's family—that's the bottom line—the de Blasio family."

When de Blasio was 18, his father committed suicide while suffering from incurable lung cancer. In 1979, de Blasio graduated from Cambridge Rindge and Latin School in Cambridge, Massachusetts, where he was in student government and was known to peers as "Senator Provolone". (Note: His nickname came from his "twin penchants for politics and Italian sandwiches". De Blasio recalled it as "a well-meaning taunt" that spoke to his "overt Italian pride" and interest in politics.) He received a Bachelor of Arts degree from New York University in Manhattan in metropolitan studies, a program in urban studies, and a Master of International Affairs degree from Columbia University's School of International and Public Affairs. He was a 1981 Harry S. Truman Scholar.

== Early career ==
In 1984, de Blasio worked for the Urban Fellows Program at the New York City Department of Juvenile Justice. In 1987, shortly after completing graduate school at Columbia, he was hired to work as a political organizer by the Quixote Center in Maryland. In 1988, he traveled with the Quixote Center to Nicaragua for 10 days to help distribute food and medicine during the Nicaraguan Revolution. De Blasio was an ardent supporter of the ruling socialist government, the Sandinista National Liberation Front, which was opposed by the Reagan administration at the time. After returning from Nicaragua, de Blasio moved to New York City, where he worked for a nonprofit organization focused on improving health care in Central America. He continued to support the Sandinistas in his spare time and joined a group called the Nicaragua Solidarity Network of Greater New York, which held meetings and fundraisers for the Sandinista political party. De Blasio's introduction to city politics came in 1989, when he worked as a volunteer coordinator for David Dinkins' mayoral campaign. After the campaign, de Blasio was an aide in City Hall. In 1990, he said he was an advocate for democratic socialism when asked about his goals for society.

U.S. Representative Charles Rangel tapped de Blasio to be his campaign manager for his successful 1994 reelection bid. In 1997, de Blasio was appointed to be the regional director for the United States Department of Housing and Urban Development (HUD) for New York and New Jersey under the administration of President Bill Clinton. As the tri-state region's highest-ranking HUD official, de Blasio led a small executive staff and took part in outreach to residents of substandard housing. In 1999, he was elected to be a school board member for Brooklyn School District 15. In 2000, he was campaign manager for Hillary Clinton's successful United States Senate bid.

== New York City Council (2002–2009) ==
=== Elections ===
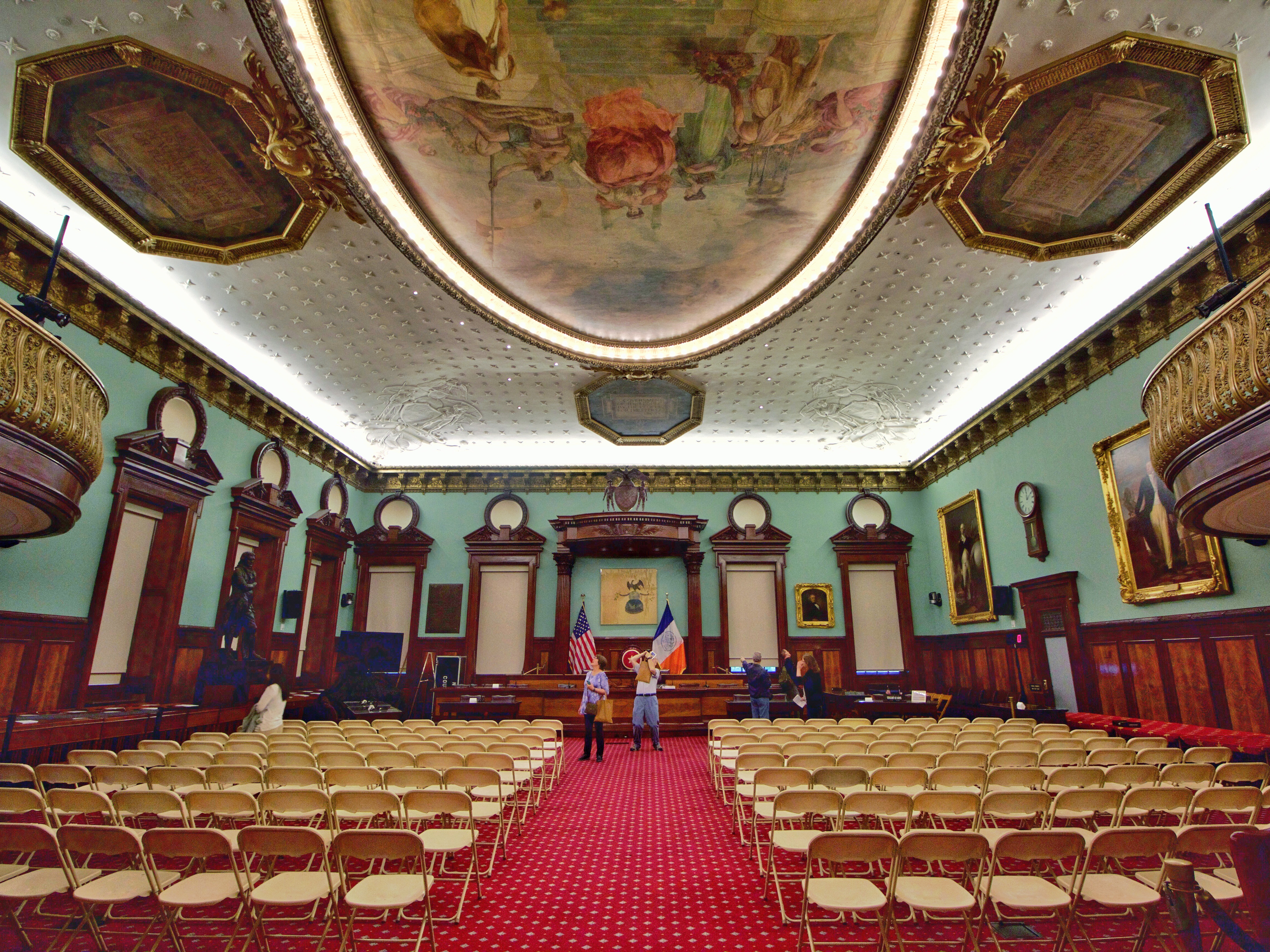
The New York City Council chambers, where de Blasio served from 2002 to 2009

In 2001, de Blasio ran for the New York City Council's 39th district, which includes the Brooklyn neighborhoods of Borough Park, Carroll Gardens, Cobble Hill, Gowanus, Kensington, Park Slope, and Windsor Terrace. He won the crowded primary election with 32% of the vote. In the general election, he defeated Republican Robert A. Bell, 71% to 17%. He was reelected with 72% of the vote in 2003 and with 83% of the vote in 2005.

=== Tenure ===
On the City Council, de Blasio passed legislation to prevent landlord discrimination against tenants who hold federal housing subsidy vouchers, and helped pass the HIV/AIDS Housing Services Law, improving housing services for low-income New Yorkers living with HIV/AIDS. As head of the city council's General Welfare Committee, De Blasio helped pass the Gender-Based Discrimination Protection Law to protect transgender New Yorkers, and passed the Domestic Partnership Recognition Law to ensure that same-sex couples in a legal partnership could enjoy the same legal benefits as heterosexual couples in New York City. During his tenure, the General Welfare Committee also passed the Benefits Translation for Immigrants Law, which helped non-English speakers receive free language-assistance services when accessing government programs. He was on the education, environmental protection, finance, and technology committees and chaired the general welfare committee.

== New York City Public Advocate (2010–2013) ==
=== 2009 election ===
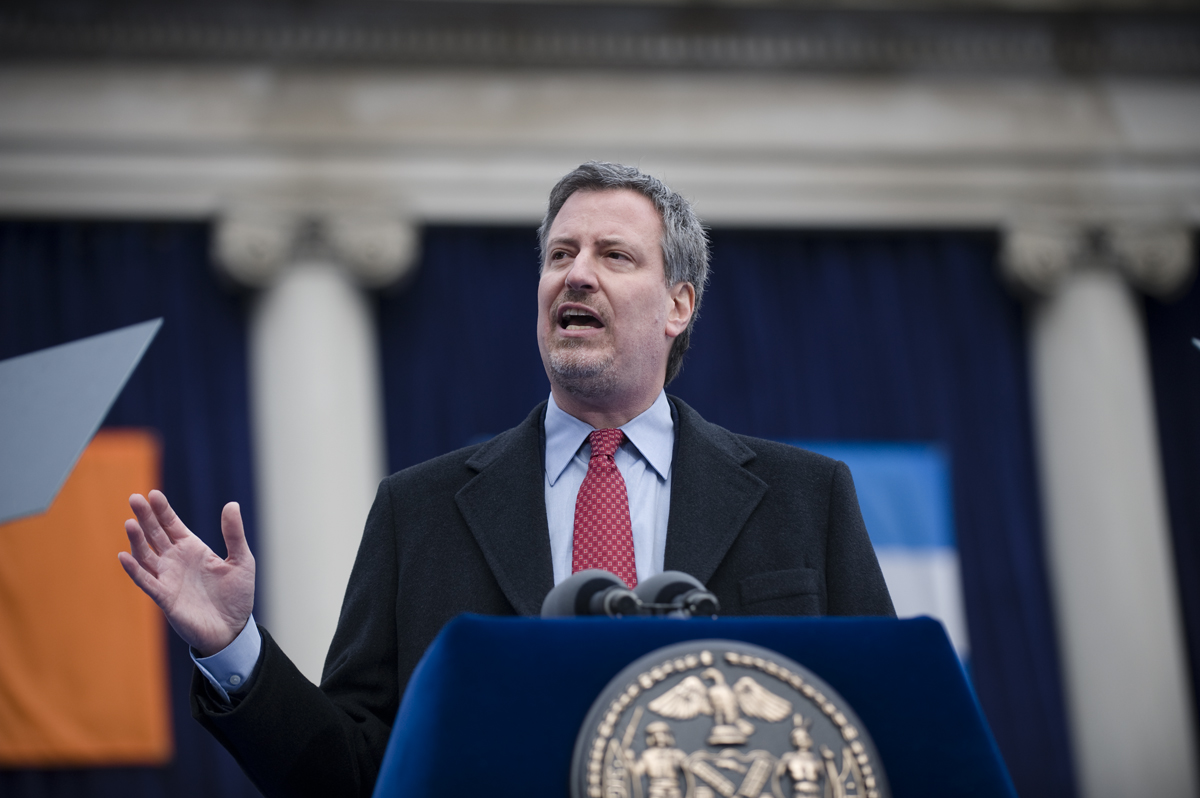
De Blasio speaking at his January 2010 inauguration

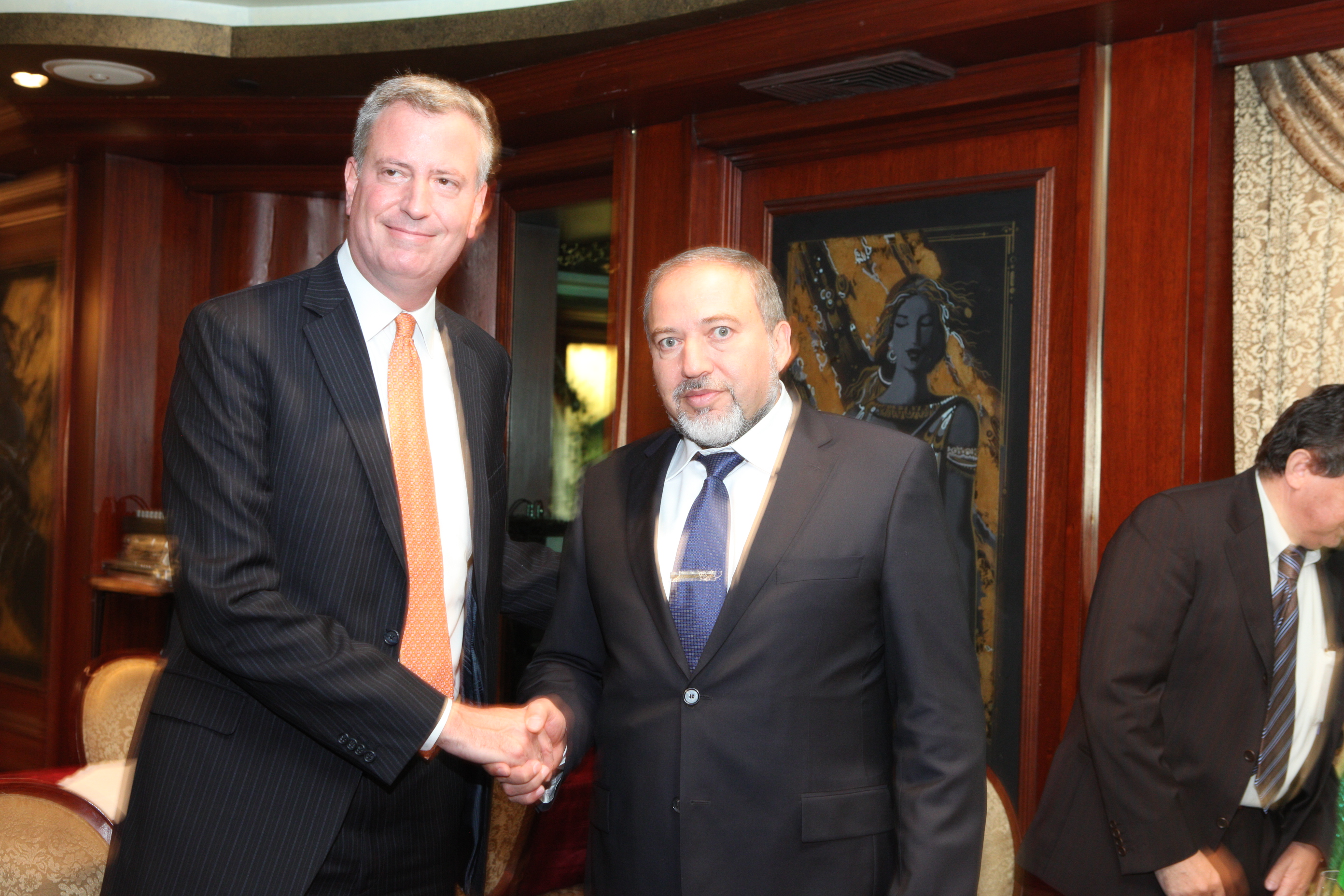
Bill de Blasio and Israeli Foreign Minister Avigdor Lieberman in September 2012

In November 2008, de Blasio announced his candidacy for New York City Public Advocate, entering a crowded field of candidates vying for the Democratic nomination that included former Public Advocate Mark Green. The New York Times endorsed de Blasio, praising his efforts to improve public schools and "[help] many less-fortunate New Yorkers with food stamps, housing, and children's health" as a councilmember. The paper declared de Blasio the best candidate for the job "because he has shown that he can work well with Mayor Bloomberg when it makes sense to do so while vehemently and eloquently opposing him when justified." His candidacy was endorsed by former Public Advocate Betsy Gotbaum, former Mayor Ed Koch, former Governor Mario Cuomo, and Reverend Al Sharpton.

On September 15, 2009, de Blasio finished first in the Democratic primary, garnering 33% of the vote. He won the runoff primary election on September 29, defeating Green, 62% to 38%. In the November 3 general election, De Blasio defeated Republican Alex Zablocki, 78% to 18%. De Blasio was inaugurated as New York City's third Public Advocate on January 1, 2010. In his inauguration speech, he criticized the Bloomberg administration, especially its homelessness and education policies.

=== Tenure ===
==== Affordable housing ====
In June 2010, de Blasio opposed a New York City Housing Authority decision to cut the number of Section 8 vouchers issued to low-income New Yorkers. The cut was announced after the NYCHA discovered it could not pay for approximately 2,600 vouchers that had already been issued. Two months later, he launched an online "NYC's Worst Landlords Watchlist" to track landlords who had failed to repair dangerous living conditions. The list drew widespread media coverage and highlighted hundreds of landlords across the city. "We want these landlords to feel like they're being watched," de Blasio told the New York Daily News. "We need to shine a light on these folks to shame them into action."

==== Campaign finance ====
De Blasio has criticized Citizens United, the January 2010 U.S. Supreme Court decision that overturned parts of the 2002 McCain–Feingold Bipartisan Campaign Reform Act. He argued that "corporations should not be allowed to buy elections" and launched a national campaign by elected officials to reverse the decision's effects.

==== Education ====
As public advocate, de Blasio repeatedly criticized Bloomberg's education policies. He called for Cathie Black, Bloomberg's nominee for New York City Schools Chancellor, to take part in public forums and criticized her for sending her own children to private schools. In March 2010, he spoke against an MTA proposal to eliminate free MetroCards for students, arguing the measure would take a significant toll on school attendance. Three months later, he voiced opposition to the mayor's proposed budget containing more than $34 million in cuts to childcare services. In June 2011, de Blasio outlined a plan to improve the process of school co-location, by which multiple schools are housed in one building. His study found community input was often ignored by the city's Department of Education, resulting in top-down decisions made without sufficient regard for negative impacts. He outlined eight solutions to improve the process and incorporate community opinion into the decision-making process. In the same month, he criticized a Bloomberg administration proposal to lay off more than 4,600 teachers to balance the city's budget; de Blasio organized parents and communities against the proposed cuts and staged a last-minute call-a-thon. Bloomberg restored the funding, agreeing to find savings elsewhere in the budget.

== Mayor of New York City (2014–2021) ==
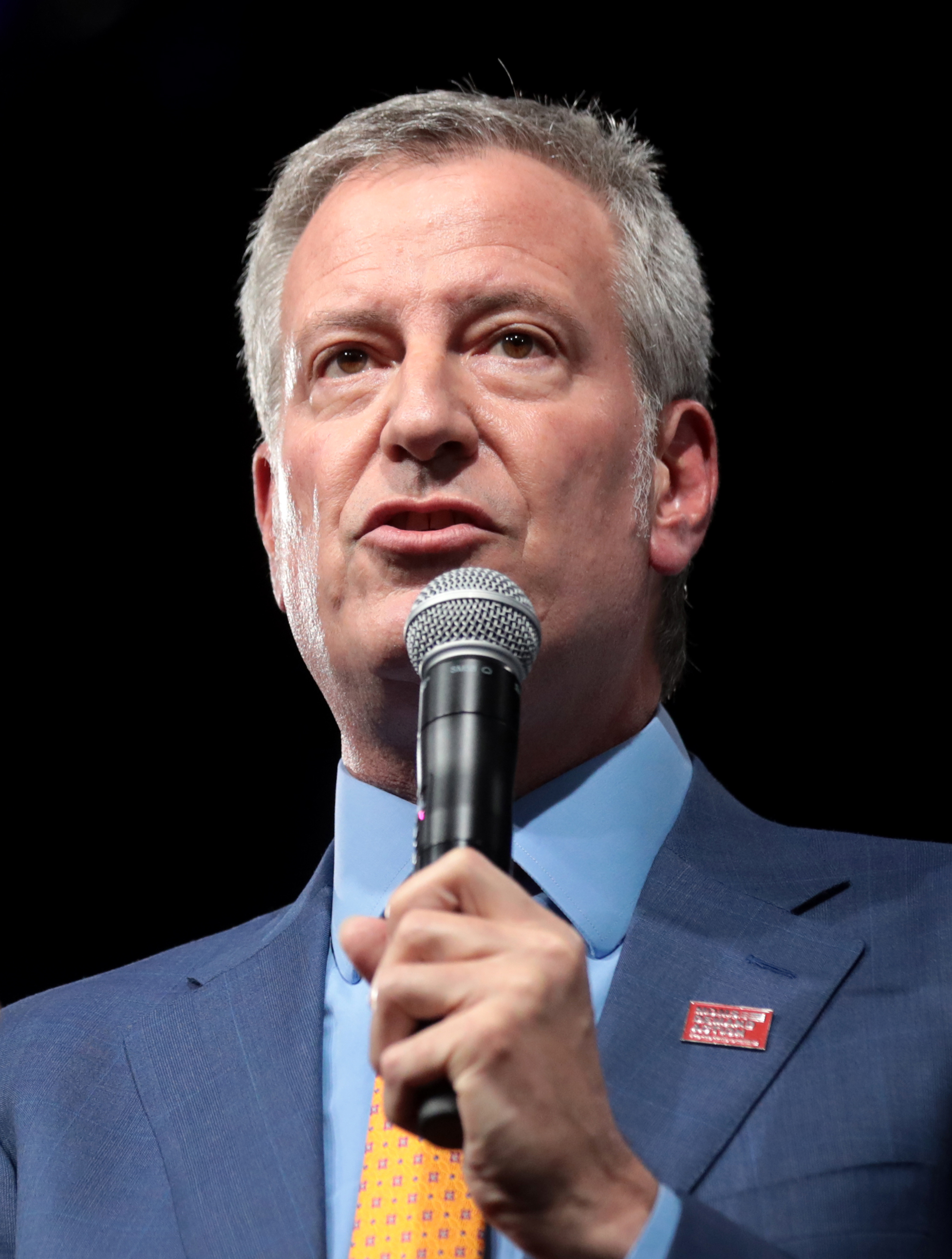
- Mayoralty of Bill de Blasio; January 1, 2014 – December 31, 2021
- Mayor: Bill de Blasio
- Party: Democratic
- Election: 2013

=== 2013 election ===
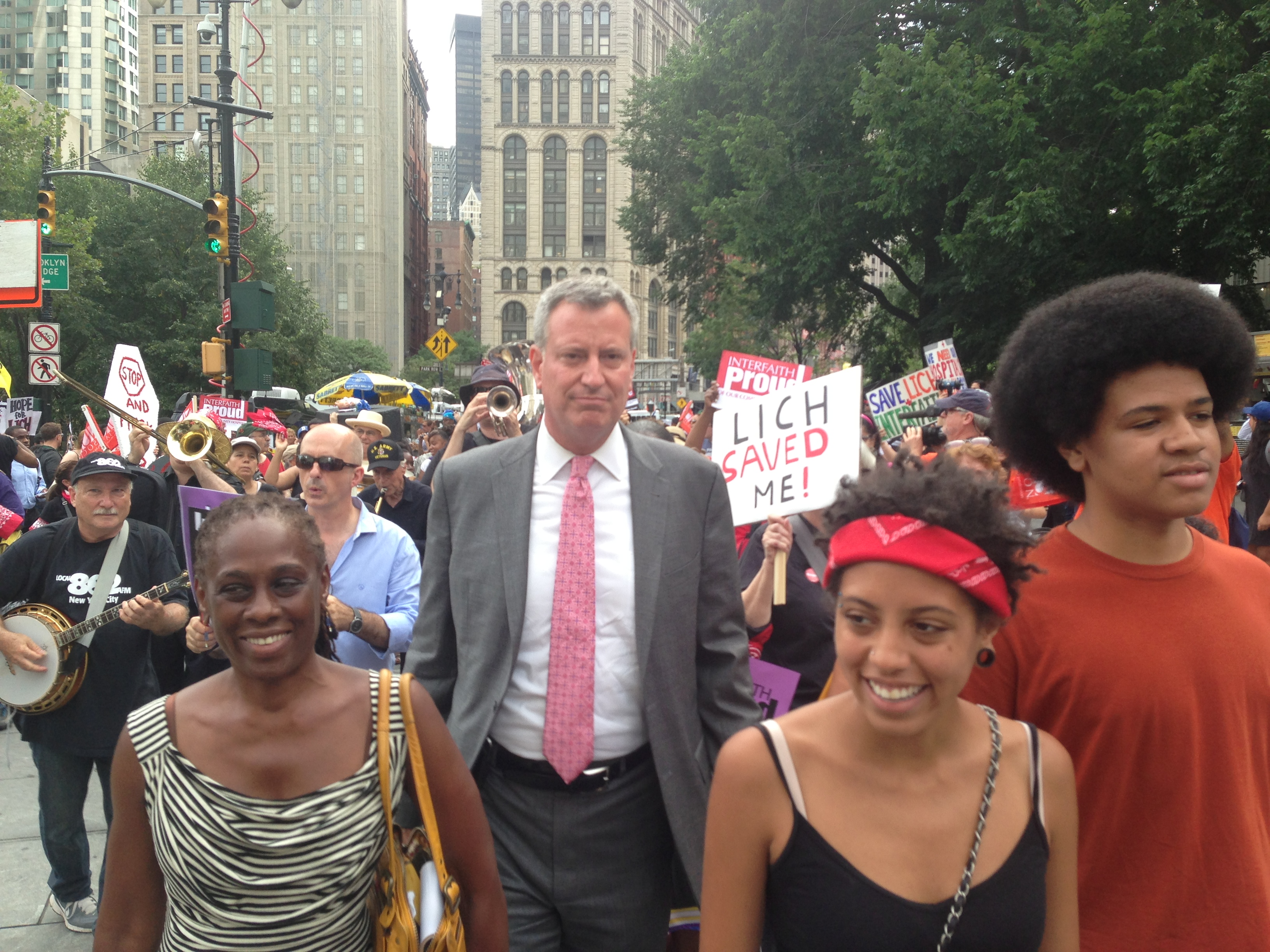
De Blasio with his wife, Chirlane (left), and their two children at a rally in Manhattan in July 2013

On January 27, 2013, de Blasio announced his candidacy for mayor of New York City in the fall election. The Democratic primary race included nine candidates, among them Council Speaker Christine Quinn, former U.S. Representative Anthony Weiner, and former New York City Comptroller and 2009 mayoral nominee Bill Thompson. After Weiner joined the race in April, early polls showed de Blasio in fourth or fifth place. Despite his poor starting position, de Blasio gained the endorsements of major Democratic clubs, such as the Barack Obama Democratic Club of Upper Manhattan, and New York City's largest trade union, SEIU Local 1199. Celebrities such as Alec Baldwin and Sarah Jessica Parker endorsed him, as did prominent politicians such as former Vermont Governor Howard Dean and U.S. Congresswoman Yvette Clarke. By August, singer Harry Belafonte and actress Susan Sarandon had also endorsed de Blasio.

De Blasio drew attention to issues of economic inequality in New York City, which he called a "tale of two cities". He gained media attention during the campaign when he and a dozen others, including city councillor Stephen Levin, were arrested while protesting the closing of Long Island College Hospital. De Blasio and Levin were released a few hours later with disorderly conduct summonses. Fellow Democratic mayoral hopefuls Weiner and City Comptroller John Liu were also at the protest but were not arrested.

During his mayoral campaign, de Blasio outlined a plan to raise taxes on residents earning more than $500,000 a year to pay for universal pre-kindergarten programs and to expand after-school programs at middle schools. He also pledged to invest $150 million annually into the City University of New York to lower tuition and improve degree programs. In September 2013, de Blasio voiced his opposition to charter schools, maintaining that their funding saps resources from classes like art, physical education and after-school programs. He outlined a plan to discontinue the policy of offering rent-free space to the city's 183 charter schools and to place a moratorium on the co-location of charter schools in public school buildings.

In August 2013, the de Blasio campaign released a television advertisement featuring de Blasio's then-15-year-old son, Dante, talking about his father's plans to "'really break from the Bloomberg years.'" Time called it "The Ad That Won the New York Mayor's Race", noting that after it ran, "de Blasio built a steady lead that he never relinquished." Quinn was attacked by a number of groups including NYCLASS with their "Anybody But Quinn" campaign, allowing de Blasio to move up in the polls. By mid-August, he emerged as the new leader among the Democrats. He reached 43% in a Quinnipiac poll released a week before the primary.

Preliminary results of the September 11 primary showed de Blasio with 40.1% of the votes, slightly more than the 40% needed to avoid a runoff. On September 16, second-place finisher Bill Thompson conceded the race, citing the unlikelihood of winning a runoff even if uncounted absentee and military ballots pushed de Blasio below the 40% threshold. Thompson's withdrawal made de Blasio the Democratic mayoral nominee. Exit polls showed that the issue that most aided de Blasio's primary victory was his unequivocal opposition to "stop and frisk." After the primary, de Blasio was announced as the nominee of the Working Families Party.

In the general election, de Blasio faced Republican candidate Joe Lhota. On Election Day, de Blasio defeated Lhota in a landslide, receiving 72.2% of the vote. Voter turnout for the election set a new record low of only 24% of registered voters, which The New York Times attributed to the expectation of a landslide in the heavily Democratic city. The finance activities of the 2013 de Blasio campaign became the subject of a federal corruption investigation led by U.S. Attorney Preet Bharara, including whether campaign donors received preferential treatment from City Hall. The investigation ended in March 2017 with no charges being filed.

=== 2017 election ===
In 2017, de Blasio won reelection to a second term, defeating Republican Assemblywoman Nicole Malliotakis, 65.2%–27.2%.

=== Tenure ===
De Blasio was sworn into office on January 1, 2014, by former President Bill Clinton. In his inaugural address, he reiterated his campaign pledge to address "economic and social inequalities" within the city. The New York Times noted that "The elevation of an assertive, tax-the-rich liberal to the nation's most prominent municipal office has fanned hopes that hot-button causes like universal prekindergarten and low-wage worker benefits... could be aided by the imprimatur of being proved workable in New York."

On January 10, 2014, the mayor received light-hearted criticism after a photoshoot where he ate a pizza with a knife and fork at a Staten Island pizzeria. In defense, de Blasio said that it was traditional in Italy to eat pizza in such a manner. Marc Cosentino, the owner of the pizzeria, later auctioned off the notorious fork for $2,500 to raise money for the Tunnel to Towers Foundation. The incident was variously dubbed "Forkgate", "Pizzagate", and "Pizzaghazi".

At a February 2, 2014 Groundhog Day ceremony, de Blasio accidentally dropped a groundhog named Charlotte onto the ground in front of "shocked schoolchildren". Charlotte died of internal injuries on February 9, 2014, although the Staten Island Zoo did not make this fact public until several months later.

In the first weeks of de Blasio's mayoralty, New York City was struck by a series of snowstorms. De Blasio was criticized by Upper East Side residents who said efforts to clear the snow seemed to be lagging in their neighborhood. De Blasio apologized the next day, saying that "more could have been done to serve the Upper East Side." On February 13, heavy snowstorms hit the East Coast again. Under instructions from De Blasio and School Chancellor Carmen Fariña, the city's public schools were kept open. This decision was criticized by teacher unions, parents and the media as 9.5 inches of snow fell that day. By the middle of February, the city had added $35 million to the Sanitation Department's budget for snow removal.

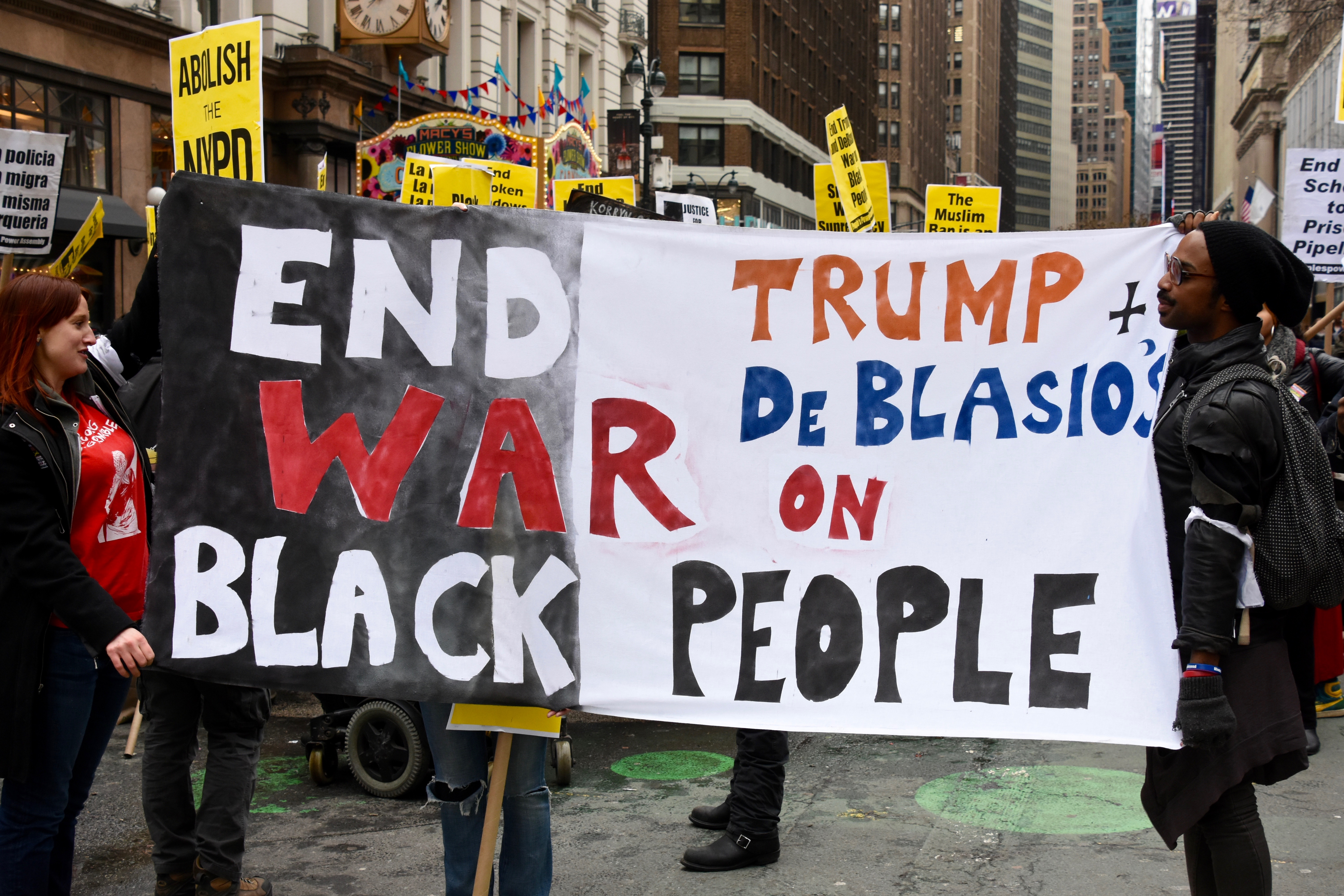
No NYC Hypocrisy rally in April 2017

De Blasio had mixed approval ratings during his mayoralty, but had low approval ratings upon leaving office.

==== 9/11 attacks ====
In 2016, de Blasio expressed support for the Justice Against Sponsors of Terrorism Act that would allow relatives of victims of the September 11 attacks to sue Saudi Arabia for its government's alleged role in the attacks.

==== Affordable housing ====
A key focus of de Blasio's mayoral tenure was to build more affordable housing, with a goal of 200,000 units. His plan passed the City Council, but was controversial. Groups such as the New York Communities for Change came out against the plan, arguing that it promoted gentrification. In April 2017, the state government renewed the 421-a tax abatement program after unions and developers made a deal on wages in qualifying construction projects.

Atlantic Avenue, in the East New York neighborhood of Brooklyn, which has been scarred by decades of poverty and crime, was the first test and focus of de Blasio's strategy on affordable housing, one of the policy initiatives central to his platform of reducing inequality. Since 2012, city planners had been working to bring residents to forums to consult on the process. The plan was to "invite developers to build up local streets in exchange for more units of affordable housing."

In January 2019, de Blasio and Secretary of Housing and Urban Development Ben Carson reached an agreement to change the operations of the New York City Housing Authority. The agreement created "specific requirements and milestones to address the serious health and safety hazards at NYCHA properties, including lead-based paint, mold, heat, vermin, among others".

==== COVID-19 response ====
On January 28, 2020, de Blasio said, "this virus was underestimated by the Chinese government. It was actually beginning to spread and was not recognized sufficiently and talked about openly." On February 13, in an interview with NBC News, he said, "this is something we can handle, but you got to follow some basic rules." On March 2, de Blasio encouraged New Yorkers in a tweet "to go on with your lives + get out on the town despite Coronavirus". On March 9, he said that the "vast majority of New Yorkers, being folks under 50 and healthy, are not in particular danger, and if they were to get it, would experience something like a common cold or flu." On March 11, he was "telling people to not avoid restaurants, not avoid normal things that people do. ... If you're not sick, you should be going about your life."

On March 16, The New York Times reported that during the previous week, de Blasio's "top aides were furiously trying to change the mayor's approach to the coronavirus outbreak. There had been arguments and shouting matches between the mayor and some of his advisers; some top health officials had even threatened to resign if he refused to accept the need to close schools and businesses." De Blasio followed their advice.

De Blasio was criticized for singling out Jewish residents of the city, following tweets directed at "the Jewish community", who described de Blasio's actions as scapegoating. In early June 2020, he was criticized for enforcing restrictions on religious gatherings to no more than 25% of capacity whereas all other groups were allowed to operate at 50% capacity. Catholic priests and Jewish synagogue worshipers then sued both De Blasio and Governor Cuomo for being more than twice as restrictive of worship than protest events. In late June, a federal judge overruled the religious worship restrictions and others that limited New York outdoor gatherings.

When Brian Lehrer asked De Blasio in a July 2020 radio interview about his approach to helping businesses recover from the pandemic, de Blasio said that his "focus has not been on the business community and the elite", and, quoting Karl Marx's Communist Manifesto, that "the state is the executive committee of the bourgeoisie." He quoted Ché Guevara, another communist figure, at a rally in Miami a year earlier, upsetting that city's Latino community.

In August 2021, De Blasio implemented the "Key to NYC Pass", the first vaccine passport in the United States. It put the onus on private businesses to exclude non-vaccinated people from everyday life. The executive order went into effect on August 17 and required anyone entering an indoor venue to show proof of vaccination. In September of that year, city inspectors began fining businesses that were not complying with the mandate. A New York State Restaurant Association survey found that 58% of restaurants said the mandates had cost them a significant amount of business. The mandates also disproportionately impacted the ability of black and brown New Yorkers to participate in everyday life. 28% of black New Yorkers 18-44 were vaccinated compared to 52% of white New Yorkers of the same age at the time of the restrictions. The passport led to protests and physical clashes with Black Lives Matter activists and other grassroots groups. These mandates extended further to all private and public sector employees in NYC. That requirement was struck down by the New York Supreme Court under the Eric Adams administration as "arbitrary and capricious".

On October 20, 2021, De Blasio announced a municipal vaccine mandate for all city workers. 1,460 workers were fired upon the mandate's enforcement with 64% being from the education department. Sanitation workers and others sued to block the mandate. On October 25, 2022, State Supreme Court Justice Ralph Porzio ruled that the city's health commissioner overstepped his authority and that the public worker mandate was arbitrary and unreasonable. He ordered fired workers to be reinstated with back pay.

==== Education ====
As mayor, de Blasio's signature initiative was the implementation of Universal Pre-K, i.e. publicly funded pre-kindergarten for all New York City residents. He sought to fund the program by increasing taxes on New York City residents earning $500,000 or more. De Blasio's initiative saw an increase in Universal Pre-K enrollment in New York City through 2015, with more than 70% of pre-K expansions happening within the ZIP codes of the city's poorest quartile. In 2017, de Blasio proposed an expansion of the program to "3-K", to include three-year-olds. Preschool for three-year-olds would start in poorer neighborhoods, with the goal of covering the entire city, if the state or federal governments provided funding.

In 2014, De Blasio's decision to deny public space to several New York City charter schools provoked controversy among advocates of school vouchers. The decision overturned a Bloomberg administration arrangement that allowed for "co-locations", where charter schools were housed in public school buildings. De Blasio also revoked $200 million of capital funding earmarked for charter schools. The New York Times emphasized that de Blasio approved 14 charter school co-locations and only denied three, suggesting that he was being unfairly cast as being opposed to charter schools. Two months after the initial decision, the mayor's office announced that it had found space for the three schools. The city would lease, renovate, and maintain three buildings, which were previously used for Catholic schools, from the Archdiocese of New York. The three charter schools are run by Success Academy Charter Schools.

==== Environmental issues ====
In April 2019, De Blasio announced his support for the Green New Deal and for legislation to ban the construction of glass and steel skyscrapers in New York City, citing environmental concerns and feeling they contribute to global warming. He also criticized the development at Hudson Yards in Manhattan.

==== Foreign Policy ====
On April 24, 2015, the 100th anniversary of the Armenian genocide, De Blasio voiced support for its national recognition.

==== George Floyd riots and protests ====
On May 31, 2020, de Blasio issued a statement blaming protesters for being in the way of two police cruisers that pushed a barricade into them. On June 7, 2020, he announced: "We will be moving funding from the NYPD to youth initiatives and social services." De Blasio blamed "anarchist" protesters for inciting and organizing violent riots.

On June 21, 2020, the American Museum of Natural History announced that it was asking city officials to remove the Equestrian Statue of Theodore Roosevelt with a Native American man and an African man standing next to the horse. De Blasio endorsed the decision.

==== Immigration ====
In July 2014, de Blasio signed a bill authorizing the creation of municipal identification cards for all residents regardless of immigration status, to help secure access to city services. Homeless New Yorkers were also eligible to obtain the IDNYC cards if they registered a "care of" address. The IDNYC card program was launched on January 1, 2015.

==== Investigations and fines ====
In May 2019, de Blasio consulted with New York City's Conflicts of Interest Board (COIB) to ask if he could bill the city for an NYPD security detail while campaigning for president of the United States. The COIB warned de Blasio at the time against billing taxpayers for travel expenses incurred by the security detail. De Blasio ultimately went on 31 out-of-state trips while campaigning, racking up $319,747 in travel costs which he billed to New York City. In October 2021, the New York City Department of Investigations published a report with findings that "the City has not been reimbursed by the de Blasio Campaign for the travel expenses of the security detail during the Mayor's presidential campaign, totaling over $300,000." In June 2023, the COIB ordered de Blasio to repay the $319,747 in security travel costs and fined him an additional $155,000, the largest fine it had ever issued. In January 2025, a judge ruled that de Blasio was responsible to pay the City $475,000.

==== Israel ====
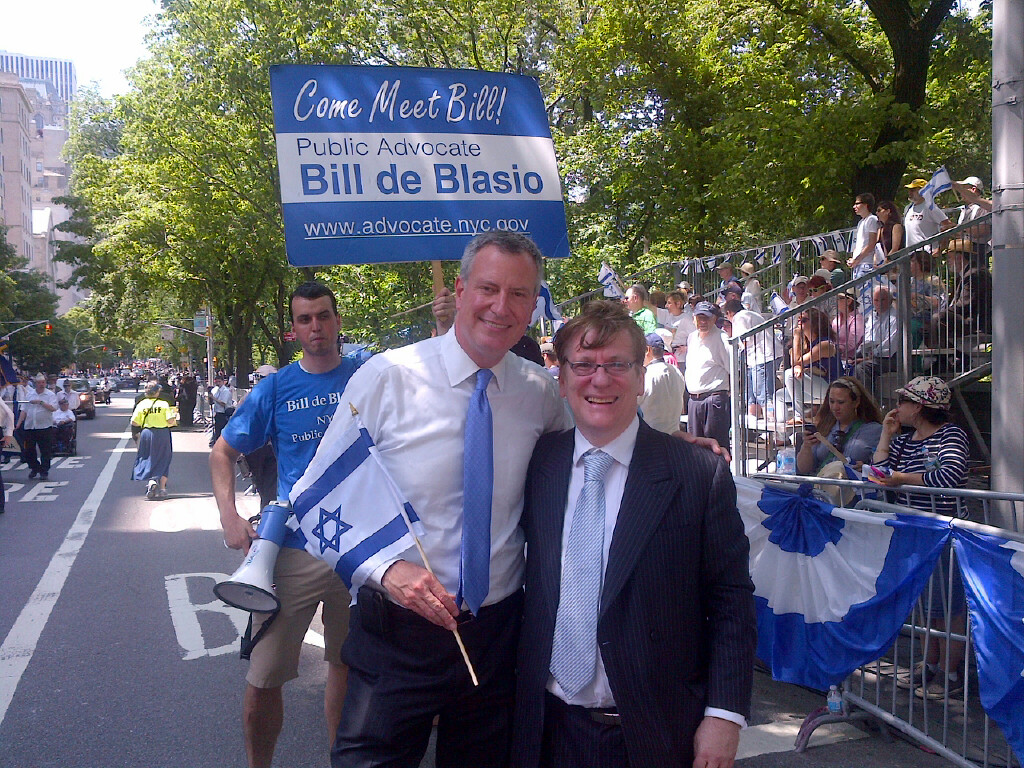
De Blasio at the Celebrate Israel Parade in June 2013

On February 14, 2019, while addressing a rally in New York City about combating antisemitism, De Blasio said: "Maybe some people don't realize it, but when they support the BDS movement, they are affronting the right of Israel to exist and that is unacceptable." De Blasio condemned Representative Ilhan Omar's remarks about Israel and pro-Israel lobbyists as "absolutely unacceptable" and "illogical".

==== Law enforcement ====
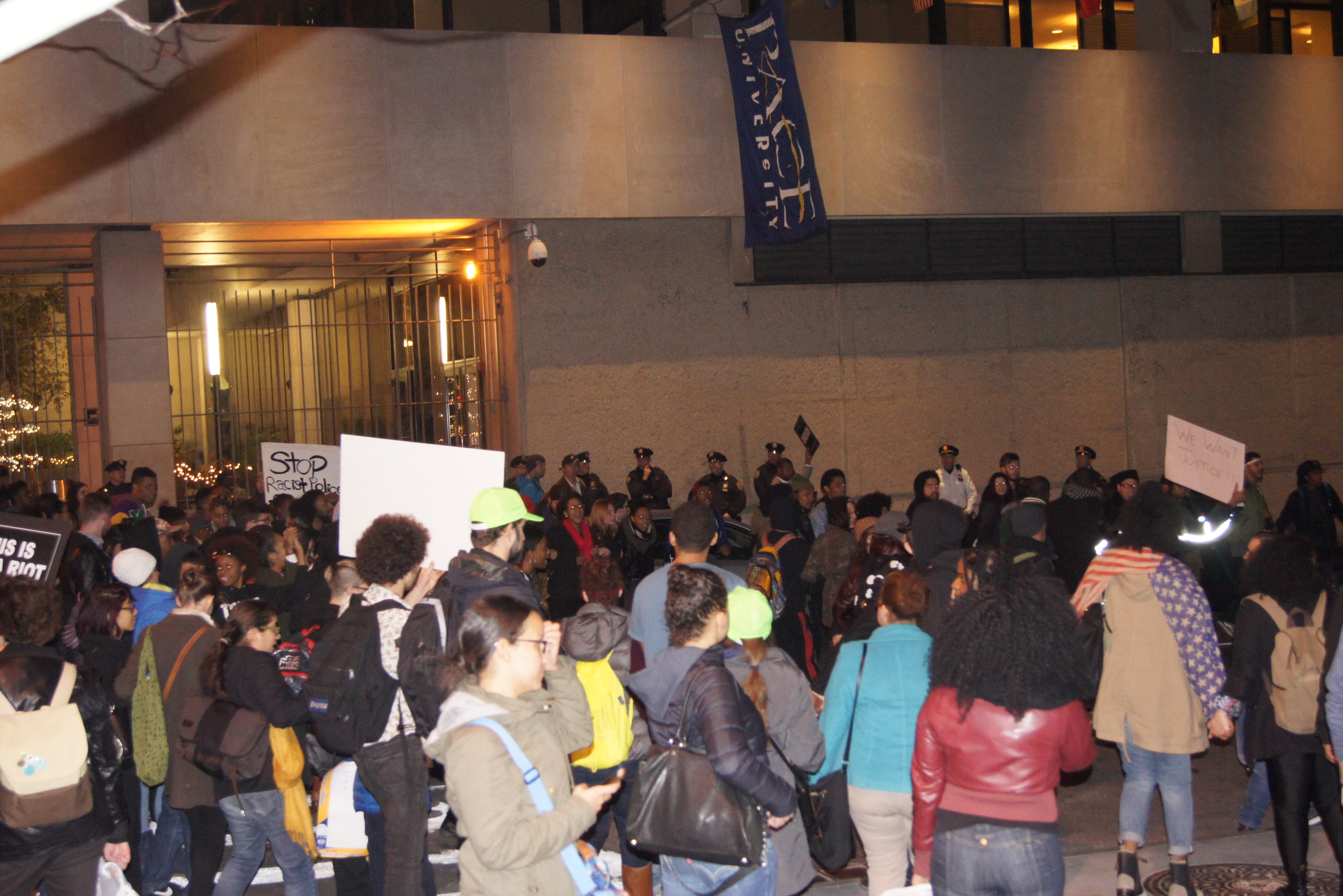
New Yorkers demonstrating against police brutality at Pace University in November 2014

During his mayoral tenure, de Blasio's relationship with the New York City Police Department was called "strained", "combative", and "frosty".

Ending the NYPD's "stop and frisk" policy was a centerpiece of De Blasio's campaign. The practice had been challenged by civil rights groups in federal court, where it was ruled unconstitutional in 2013. The federal appeal of this decision filed by the Bloomberg administration was dropped by de Blasio when he took office. He vowed to settle cases with claimants who had ongoing litigation against the police for stop and frisk arrests. The NYPD union appealed the decision without de Blasio's support, and was rejected.

De Blasio selected Bill Bratton for New York City Police Commissioner, a position he had held under Mayor Rudy Giuliani. Bratton, who introduced stop and frisk under Giuliani, promised it would be used "legally, respectfully" and less frequently. Some de Blasio supporters were disappointed by Bratton's appointment. A 2016 report from Politico, based on data from the New York Civil Liberties Union, showed that the use of stop-and-frisk by the NYPD had been reduced during the de Blasio administration.

In February 2014, Pastor Bishop Orlando Findlayter—the founder of the New Hope Christian Fellowship Church, and a friend and supporter of de Blasio—was pulled over for failing to signal before making a left turn. Findlayter was then detained by police on outstanding warrants and driving with a suspended license. De Blasio is alleged to have called the police on Findlayter's behalf. Findlayter was released shortly thereafter. In a press conference, de Blasio told reporters that while he had called the police to make an inquiry regarding Findlayter's arrest he did not ask the police to release him. A spokesperson for the mayor said that de Blasio's call occurred after the police already had decided to release Findlayter. While both the police and City Hall denied that De Blasio requested preferential treatment for Findlayter, City Comptroller Scott M. Stringer said De Blasio's behavior was concerning because "the mayor shouldn't be involved in any way about somebody's arrest."

In April 2014, the NYPD disbanded a unit that had engaged in secret surveillance of Muslim organizations. De Blasio commented, "'This reform is a critical step forward in easing tensions between the police and the communities they serve, so that our cops and our citizens can help one another go after the real bad guys'".

On December 3, 2014, after a grand jury decided not to indict NYPD officer Daniel Pantaleo in the death of Eric Garner, de Blasio said in a speech that he and his African American wife, Chirlane McCray, had had many conversations with their biracial son about taking "special care in any encounters he has with the police officers who are there to protect him". De Blasio also "offered qualified support for protesters after the grand jury decision not to charge the officer involved in the chokehold death of Eric Garner in New York City". Under de Blasio, New York City police officers were trained in de-escalation techniques.

After New York City police officers Wenjian Liu and Rafael Ramos were killed in an ambush in December 2014, "cops and union leaders publicly rebuked [de Blasio], arguing [that] his earlier remarks had stoked anti-police sentiment." When de Blasio eulogized the two fallen officers, hundreds of their fellow police officers turned their backs on him. After the murder of New York City police officer Miosotis Familia in July 2017, de Blasio received further criticism for not attending Familia's vigil. Many officers again turned their backs on him when he spoke at a service for Familia.

==== Marijuana ====
In May 2018, de Blasio directed the NYPD to stop making arrests of persons smoking marijuana publicly, and to instead issue summonses in such cases.

In December 2018, De Blasio announced his support for marijuana legalization in New York City, calling it a "once-in-a-generation opportunity to get a historic issue right for future New Yorkers." He worked with a marijuana task force to produce a report on licensing and regulation, which was released along with a letter of endorsement.

==== Mohel disclosure rule ====
In 2015, de Blasio repealed a public health requirement that mohels inform parents of the risks of metzitzah b'peh, an oral circumcision ritual that was linked to 17 cases of infant herpes, brain damage, and two deaths since 2000. In 2012, the rule was passed by the city's Board of Health, which required parents to sign a consent form. Some ultra-Orthodox Jewish leaders called the requirement an infringement on religious freedom, sued the city in federal court, and pressed their followers not to comply. After de Blasio installed allies and donors on New York City's Board of Health, a new policy was instated that mohels could be banned for life if they tested positive for herpes and the DNA strain matched the infant's, but only after a child was infected. It was soon revealed that the city was not disclosing new infections as required by the new policy, and children continued to become infected after undergoing the ritual.

==== Nepotism laws ====
De Blasio put his wife, Chirlane McCray, in charge of major policy initiatives such as the Mayor's Fund to Advance New York City and ThriveNYC (a $850 million mental health initiative). This caused criticism since McCray had never been elected to office and was chosen for these positions only because of her relationship with De Blasio. De Blasio accused critics of the arrangement of "sexism" and bemoaned the city's anti-nepotism laws that prevented McCray from receiving a substantial salary.

==== Technology and innovation ====
When de Blasio appointed Minerva Tantoco as the city's chief technology officer in fall 2014, he said her goal would be to "develop and implement a coordinated strategy for technology and innovation, for how this city as a whole is going to approach the role of technology in our everyday lives, in our economy, in our schools, in our civic participation." Two years later, Tantoco's efforts were only partially successful.

Along with Governor Cuomo, de Blasio supported moving Amazon's headquarters to Long Island City in the Amazon HQ2 search, and worked with Cuomo to develop a benefits package from New York City and State funds totaling $2.988 billion. In November 2018, Long Island City in Queens was selected as one of two sites for HQ2, along with Crystal City in Arlington County, Virginia, outside of Washington, D.C. Long Island City's selection as a site for Amazon's HQ2 was controversial before and after it happened, and was protested by local residents, community organizations, and politicians. After receiving pushback, Amazon withdrew its plans to open HQ2 in Long Island City on February 14, 2019. De Blasio criticized Amazon's decision.

==== ThriveNYC ====
In November 2015, First Lady Chirlane McCray led the launch of ThriveNYC, a plan to overhaul the city's mental health and substance abuse services. ThriveNYC promoted an integrated public health approach focusing on awareness and early identification.

In February 2019, Politico criticized ThriveNYC for having an "opaque budget" and "elusive metrics". In a March 2019 article on ThriveNYC, The New York Times reported: "Public health officials credit the plan for drawing attention to mental health… At the same time, some initiatives failed to get started, while others placed unrealistic demands on already strained mental health services". The Times added: "A spreadsheet of nearly 500 data points tracked by City Hall included almost none related to patient outcomes". ThriveNYC drew harsh criticism over allegations of mismanagement and accusations that it had failed to produce records of tangible results. As of March 2019, nearly $850 million in funding for McCray's mental health program was unaccounted for; furthermore, the program was on track to spend $1 billion over five years. Bronx Councilman Ritchie Torres criticized ThriveNYC, stating that there was "no evidence it's working".

In 2021, de Blasio made ThriveNYC permanent by executive order, rebranding the initiative as the Office of Community Mental Health. Furthermore, a 2021 budget deal allocated a further $115 million to the program; the spending plan included $96 million for B-HEARD, an initiative to dispatch EMTs and social workers as first responders to 911 calls involving mentally ill people in an effort to prevent confrontations with the police.

==== Transportation ====
In 2014, de Blasio released a report dedicated to "better transit for New York City." Some of the ideas brought up in the report were to rebuild Penn Station/Madison Square Garden, create more bus rapid transit routes, and a "Vision Zero" initiative to reduce traffic-related deaths in the city.

The "Vision Zero" initiative, inspired by a successful Swedish plan, saw a gradual decrease in pedestrian fatalities, from 299 in 2013 to 200 in 2018. But in 2019 there was an increase in cyclist deaths, and de Blasio discussed several proposals to combat cyclist deaths, including a $58.4 million plan and requiring cyclists to wear helmets and acquire licenses to operate a bicycle.

While the de Blasio administration planned on increasing the rate at which bicycle racks were added in the city, the annual rate instead fell by 42% compared to the Bloomberg administration, reaching a new average of 1,633 new racks per year. Jon Orcutt, a spokesman for Bike New York, said: "Everybody's talking about Citi Bikes and scooters but it's the humble bike rack that needs more attention."

== 2020 presidential campaign ==
de Blasio 2020
- Campaign: 2020 presidential election (Democratic Party primaries)
- Candidate: Bill de Blasio; Mayor of New York City (2014–2021)
- Affiliation: Democratic Party
- Status: Inactive
- Announced: May 16, 2019
- Suspended: September 20, 2019
- Headquarters: New York City, New York
- Receipts: US$1,417,609.97 (9/30/2019)
- Slogan: Working People First

Website
- billdeblasio.com (archived – August 2, 2019)

On May 16, 2019, de Blasio announced that he would seek the Democratic nomination for president after releasing a YouTube video in which he said, "I'm Bill de Blasio, and I'm running for president because it's time we put working people first." He was the first incumbent mayor of New York City to run for president since John Lindsay, who ran for the Democratic nomination in 1972.

During his campaign, de Blasio expressed support for increasing the federal minimum wage to $15 an hour. On June 19, 2019, he said: "We have to make sure there is a peace settlement in Afghanistan; it obviously has to involve the Taliban. Until that point, I don't think it's sensible to take out our troops." De Blasio advocated a robot tax and proposed to make large corporations responsible for five years of income tax from jobs that are automated away.

De Blasio's campaign failed to gain traction. He was unable to qualify for Democratic primary debates in September and October, which were seen as necessary events for his campaign to maintain viability. He regularly polled at 0% among Democratic primary voters, including in his home state. A May 2019 Quinnipiac University poll of New York City voters found that 76% did not want de Blasio to run for president. After failing to qualify for the third round of primary debates, de Blasio announced the suspension of his campaign on September 20, 2019. On February 14, 2020, de Blasio endorsed Sanders.

In May 2023, the Federal Election Commission issued a $53,000 fine against de Blasio's campaign for accepting improper contributions. In January 2025, a judge ruled that de Blasio was responsible for all costs associated with his mayoral security detail's out-of-state travel in connection with his presidential bid; the total cost was $475,000.

== Post-mayoral career ==
In 2022, de Blasio ran for the U.S. House of Representatives in the newly redrawn 10th congressional district. After receiving scant support in public polls, he withdrew from the race on July 19 and stated that he was done with "electoral politics". During the fall of 2022 he was a visiting fellow at the Institute of Politics (IOP) at Harvard University. During 2023 he was the Marnold Visiting Scholar from the Wagner Graduate School of Public Service at the New York University (NYU). During the Winter of 2024 he was the Harry A. and Margaret D. Towsley Foundation Policymaker in Residence from the Ford School of Public Policy at the University of Michigan (UMich, U-M, or Michigan).

In September 2025, de Blasio endorsed Zohran Mamdani for mayor of New York City. On October 28, 2025, The Times of London published an article falsely claiming to feature quotes by de Blasio that expressed negative views about Mamdani's campaign. The article was deleted two hours after publication. The actual interviewee was later revealed to be Bill DeBlasio, a wine importer living in Huntington Station, New York. DeBlasio used ChatGPT to generate a response to the reporter's initial email, and received an interview through his home's Ring doorbell. On October 30, The Nation published an article by the former mayor de Blasio about the incident, stating that he gave the reporter some credit for apologizing to him directly, but expressing concern about the state of journalism "in a hyper-partisan era when standards of objectivity and decency are decaying week by week".

== Personal life ==
De Blasio and his wife, activist and poet Chirlane McCray, met while both were working for Mayor David Dinkins' administration and married in 1994. The couple honeymooned in Cuba in violation of a US travel ban. They lived in Park Slope, Brooklyn before they moved to Gracie Mansion, the traditional residence of New York City mayors. They have two children: Dante, a graduate of Brooklyn Technical High School who graduated from Yale University in 2019, and Chiara, a student at Santa Clara University in Santa Clara, California. Chiara addressed her drug use and depression in late December 2013 in a four-minute video which de Blasio's mayoral transition team released.

In July 2023, De Blasio and McCray announced their separation. The couple added that they intended to start dating other people, but that they would not seek a divorce and would continue to share their Park Slope residence. Since that time, de Blasio has reportedly dated multiple women. In February 2025, he announced that he was dating journalist Nomiki Konst. In December 2025, de Blasio announced he had split with Konst and was dating Roxanna Valenzuela, mayor of South Tucson. At 6 ft 5 7/8 in (1.98 m), De Blasio is the tallest mayor in New York City's history.

De Blasio, an Italian American, occasionally gives interviews, press conferences, and speeches in Italian. He appeared as himself as mayor on The Good Wife in 2014, a TV show he said he was "deeply obsessed" with.

De Blasio is a passionate fan of the Boston Red Sox and he has a "deep devotion" to the New York Yankees' archrivals.

=== Religion ===
De Blasio has described himself as "spiritual but not religious". His mother rejected her Catholic faith. He did not attend church in his early life.

=== Net worth ===
According to Forbes, De Blasio and his wife had a net worth of $2.5 million as of August 2019.

== See also ==
- List of mayors of New York City
- List of mayors of the 50 largest cities in the United States

== Citations ==
Civic offices
Preceded by Stephen DiBrienza	Member of the New York City Council from the 39th district 2002–2009	Succeeded by Brad Lander
Political offices
Preceded by Betsy Gotbaum	New York City Public Advocate; 2010–2013	Succeeded by Letitia James
Preceded by Michael Bloomberg	Mayor of New York City; 2014–2021	Succeeded by Eric Adams
Party political offices
Preceded by Bill Thompson	Democratic nominee for Mayor of New York City; 2013, 2017	Succeeded by Eric Adams
