= Betsy Gotbaum =

American politician and activist

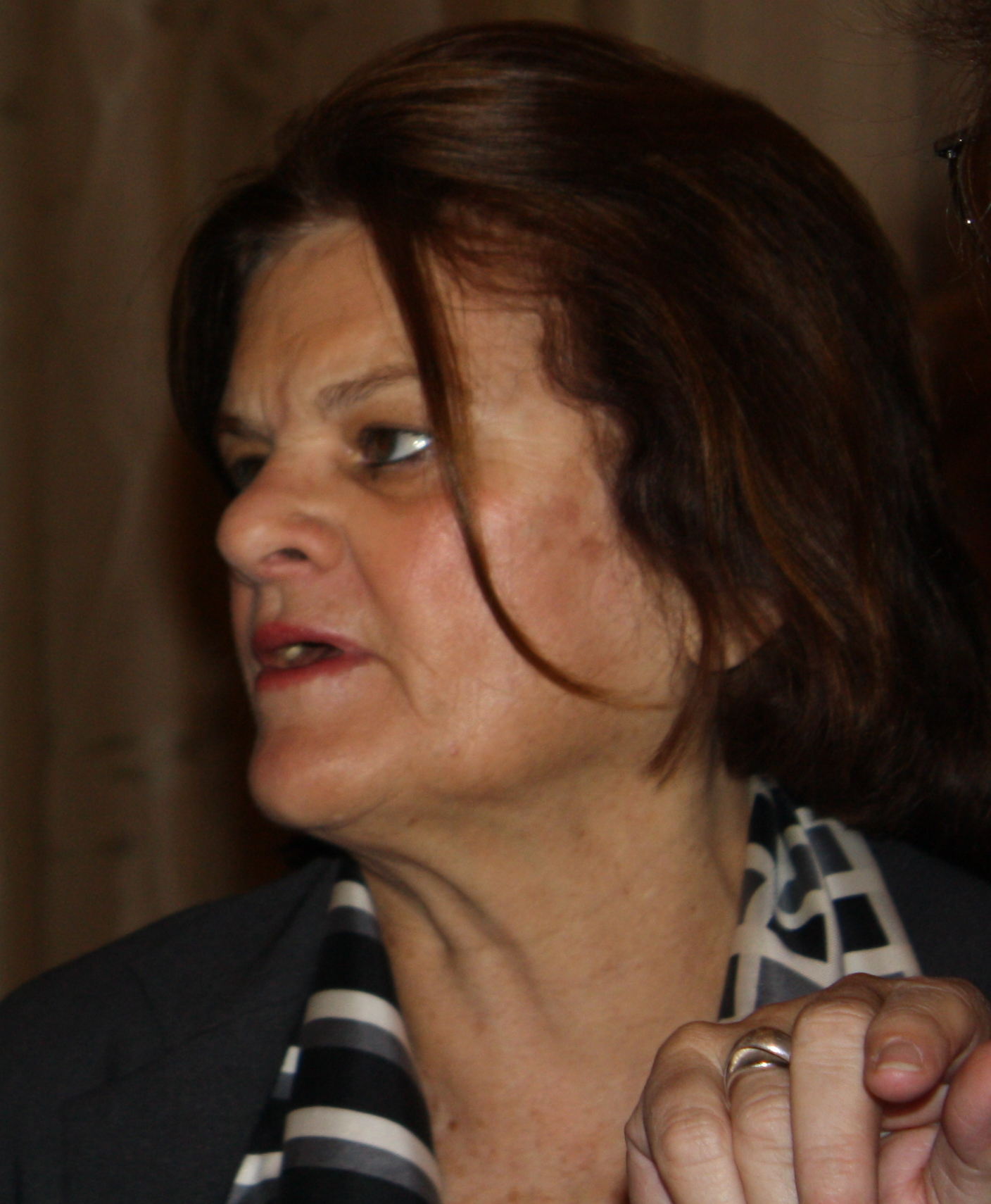

2nd New York City Public Advocate
- In office January 1, 2002 – December 31, 2009
- Mayor: Michael Bloomberg
- Preceded by: Mark Green
- Succeeded by: Bill de Blasio

Parks Commissioner of New York City
- In office February 5, 1990 – December 31, 1993
- Mayor: David Dinkins
- Preceded by: Henry Stern
- Succeeded by: Henry Stern

Personal details
- Born: Elisabeth Flower; June 11, 1938 (age 88) New York City, New York, U.S.
- Party: Democratic
- Spouses: Timothy Hogen (m. 1960; div. 1967) Victor Gotbaum (m. 1977; died 2015) Peter Lewis (m. 2017)
- Children: 1
- Education: Connecticut College; George Washington University (BA); Columbia University (MEd)

Elisabeth A. Gotbaum (née Flower; born June 11, 1938) is an American civil servant, politician and a former New York City public advocate. She was elected Public Advocate for New York City in 2001 and reelected in 2005. She was the third woman elected to a citywide post in NYC history. The other two were Carol Bellamy, who served as city council president from 1978 to 1985, and Elizabeth Holtzman, who served as comptroller from 1990 to 1993. Gotbaum is a Democrat and currently serves as Executive Director of Citizens Union.

== Early life and education ==
Flower attended the Brearley School, and graduated from the Masters School in Dobbs Ferry in 1956. She attended Connecticut College for two years, followed by Barnard College of Columbia University. She earned her B.A. from George Washington University in 1961. After graduation, she moved to Recife, Brazil, where she taught high school English and mastered Spanish and Portuguese. She returned to New York several years later and earned a master's degree in education from Teachers College, Columbia University.

== Political career ==
Gotbaum became involved in civic affairs in the 1970s, while serving on the staff of former mayor John Lindsay as District Manager for the Chelsea-Clinton (Manhattan West) Neighborhood, Assistant for Women's Issues, and Assistant for Education. She continued her work in education with Mayor Abraham Beame, managing a training program for school security officers. In the late 1970s, she was recruited to run the New York City Police Foundation. At the Police Foundation, she developed an innovative citywide health screening and work-site hypertension program with the New York City Police Department and facilitated an intensive training program for 911 operators. She created a program engaging New York City in a campaign to purchase bulletproof vests for every police officer. In 1990 newly elected Mayor David Dinkins appointed her the first female Commissioner of the New York City Department of Parks and Recreation. Gotbaum created a toll-free Parks hotline and successfully argued for a change in city policy allowing Gay Men's Health Crisis (GMHC) and other organizations use of Central Park for fundraising events.

After leaving the Parks Department in 1994, Gotbaum became President of the New-York Historical Society, a position she held until launching her campaign for Public Advocate in 2001. When she took over, the Historical Society was closed to the public and on the verge of bankruptcy after years of mismanagement. Gotbaum rescued the institution from financial collapse, renovated its landmark building, and recalled its collections from various warehouses. In November 2000, she opened the Henry Luce III Center for the Study of American Culture. She instituted exhibitions, education and public programs for a diverse and ever-increasing audience, leaving the society with a $33 million endowment. Gotbaum resigned from the Historical Society to run for the Office of the Public Advocate.

=== 2001 race for Public Advocate ===
In 2001, Gotbaum finished first in the Democratic primary and then defeated Norman Siegel in the Democratic runoff. She was unopposed in the general election. As Public Advocate she focused on education policy, along with women's issues, child welfare, affordable housing and senior services. She was known to work with Mayor Michael Bloomberg on certain issues, but she battled Bloomberg on mayoral succession issues. In return, Bloomberg sought to eliminate the office altogether in 2002 and reduced its budget. At the request of the New York State Legislature, Gotbaum created a Commission on School Governance to examine mayoral control before it expires in 2009.

=== 2005 race for Public Advocate ===
In the September 13, 2005, Democratic primary, Gotbaum beat civil rights advocate Norman Siegel, and real estate broker Michael Brown came in third with fifteen percent of NYC's vote. She was unopposed in the general election. She took the oath of office for a second term on January 1, 2006.

=== 2009 race for Public Advocate ===
Despite the extension of New York City term limits, which made Gotbaum eligible for a third term, she decided not to run for reelection.

== Personal life ==
Her second husband, Victor Gotbaum (1921–2015), was a retired New York City labor leader who served for 22 years as president of AFSCME District Council 37, New York's largest public employee union. She has a daughter, Barr Hogen, from her first marriage (from 1960 to 1967) to Timothy Hogen. Gotbaum married investment banker Peter A. Lewis in 2017.

On September 28, 2007, her stepdaughter-in-law, Carol Gotbaum, died in custody shortly after she was arrested at Phoenix Sky Harbor International Airport, after getting into a confrontation with gate crews who refused to allow her to board a plane to Tucson, Arizona. In May 2008, the family filed a lawsuit against the City of Phoenix.

Government offices
Preceded by Henry Stern	Parks Commissioner of New York City; 1990–1994	Succeeded by Henry Stern
Political offices
Preceded by Mark Green	New York City Public Advocate; 2002–2009	Succeeded by Bill de Blasio
