= 2009 New York City mayoral election =

- November 3, 2009
- Registered: 4,095,561
- Turnout: 1,154,802; 28.19% (▼5.15 pp)
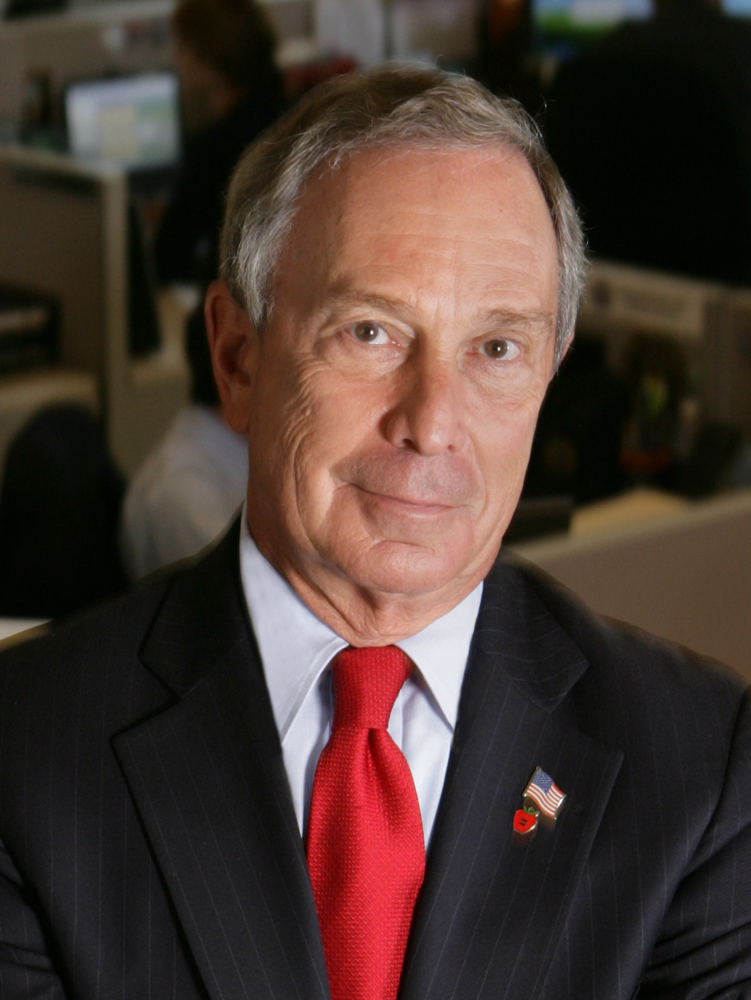

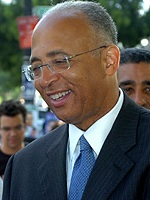
Nominee	Michael Bloomberg	Bill Thompson
Party	Independent	Democratic
Alliance	Republican; Independence	Working Families
Popular vote	585,466	534,869
Percentage	50.7%	46.3%
- Bloomberg: 40–50% 50–60% 60–70% 70–80% 80–90% Thompson: 40–50% 50–60% 60–70% 70–80% 80–90%
Mayor before election
Michael Bloomberg
Independent
Elected Mayor
Michael Bloomberg
Independent

The 2009 election for mayor of New York City took place on Tuesday, November 3. Incumbent Michael Bloomberg, an independent who left the Republican Party in 2007, was reelected on the Republican and Independence Party/Jobs & Education lines with 50.7% of the vote, over the retiring City Comptroller, Bill Thompson, a Democrat (also endorsed by the Working Families Party), who won 46.3%. Thompson had won the Democratic primary election on September 15 with 71% of the vote, over City Councilman Tony Avella and Roland Rogers. This was the fifth straight mayoral victory by Republican nominees in New York, and the most recent to date, despite the city's strong Democratic lean in national and state elections.

Six other parties' candidates also contested the general election in November. Stephen Christopher of the Conservative Party of New York won 1.6% of the vote, more than the combined total of all the other minor candidates. The turnout of voters—fewer than 350,000 in September, and fewer than 1.2 million in November—was relatively low for recent mayoral elections, and Bloomberg won with fewer votes than any successful mayoral candidate had received since women joined the city's electorate in 1917. Democrats flipped back the borough of Brooklyn. To date, this is the last time a candidate on the Republican line carried Manhattan or Queens.

Before the election, the New York City Council voted to extend the city's term limits, permitting Bloomberg (previously elected in 2001 and 2005) and other second-term officeholders, such as Thompson, to run for a third term by way of Local Law 51 of 2008. Attempts to put this decision to a popular referendum, to reverse it in the federal courts, or to override it with state legislation were unsuccessful.

== Background ==
New York City elected its Mayor by popular vote when Greater New York was formed in 1897, then in 1901, 1903, 1905, and every four years thereafter, as well as in the special elections of 1930 and 1950. Nineteen of the 31 mayoral elections held between 1897 and 2005 were won by the official candidate of the Democratic Party, eight by the Republican Party's nominee, and four by others. (The last official Democratic candidate to win the mayoralty was David Dinkins in the election of 1989; the last candidate to win the mayoralty without winning either the Republican or the Democratic primary was Mayor John V. Lindsay, running for re-election on the Liberal column in 1969.)

Michael Bloomberg, formerly a Democrat, was elected as a Republican in 2001 and 2005, succeeding another Republican mayor, Rudy Giuliani, elected in 1993 and 1997. Bloomberg left the Republican Party in 2008 and became a political independent. By a hotly contested vote of 29–22 on October 23, 2008, the New York City Council extended the former two-term limit for mayor, council, and other elected city offices to three terms, allowing Bloomberg to pursue his announced intention to seek a third term in 2009. Legal challenges to the extension failed in federal court, and a proposed law in the New York State Legislature to override the extension was not passed.

Bloomberg's most prominent opponent was Bill Thompson, who could (similarly) have run for a third term as New York City comptroller in 2009, but instead sought, and won, the Democratic nomination for mayor.

== Republican primary ==
=== Candidates ===
==== Nominee ====
- Michael Bloomberg, incumbent mayor since 2002 (Independent)

==== Withdrew ====
- Bruce Blakeman, attorney and member of the board of the Port Authority of New York and New Jersey (endorsed Bloomberg)

==== Declined ====
- Richard Parsons, chairman of Citigroup (endorsed Bloomberg)

=== Results ===
Though he had changed his party registration to unaffiliated, Bloomberg was unopposed for the Republican nomination in the party primary.

== Democratic primary ==
=== Candidates ===
- Tony Avella, member of the New York City Council from Queens
- Roland Rogers
- Bill Thompson, New York City comptroller since 2002 (Democratic and Working Families)

==== Withdrew ====
- Anthony Weiner, U.S. representative (withdrew on May 28, 2009) (endorsed Thompson)

=== Campaign ===
Thompson and Avella held their first televised debate on August 26 at the New York Public Library. They both directed more fire at Bloomberg than at each other. "After eight years of a Republican mayor who is focused on developers and the wealthy, I think New Yorkers are looking for change", Thompson said, while Avella declared that the "arrogance of billionaire Mike Bloomberg to think he's so important that he can overturn the term limits law, I think, is disgraceful." Another debate was held on September 9.

2009 New York City mayoral election Democratic primary debates
No.	Date	Host	Moderator	Link	Democratic	Democratic
Key: P Participant A Absent N Not invited I Invited W Withdrawn						
Key: P Participant A Absent N Not invited I Invited W Withdrawn					Tony Avella	Bill Thompson
1	Aug. 26, 2009	Citizens Union, New York One; New York One Noticias; New York Daily News; New York City Campaign Finance Board; Time Warner Cable, and WNYC-FM	Dominic Carter	YouTube	P	P
2	Sep. 9, 2009	1010 WINS; League of Women Voters of New York City; New York City Campaign Finance Board; Univision, and WABC-TV	Bill Ritter	YouTube	P	P

=== Results ===
Results by state assembly district Thompson: 40%–50%; 50%–60%; 60%–70%; 70%–80%; 80%–90%; Avella: 60%–70%

2009 Democratic primary	Manhattan	The Bronx	Brooklyn	Queens	Staten Island	Total	%
Bill Thompson	70,881	31,950	75,519	49,063	7,484	234,897	71.0%
Bill Thompson	73.7%	73.5%	73.9%	63.2%	67.0%	234,897	71.0%
Tony Avella	18,213	7,754	17,945	22,903	2,959	69,774	21.1%
Tony Avella	18.9%	17.8%	17.6%	29.5%	26.5%	69,774	21.1%
Roland Rogers	6,975	3,751	8,612	5,553	700	25,591	7.7%
Roland Rogers	7.3%	8.6%	8.4%	7.2%	6.3%	25,591	7.7%
All write-in votes	127	10	153	81	26	397	0.1%
All write-in votes	0.1%	0.02%	0.1%	0.1%	0.2%	397	0.1%
Total	96,196	43,465	102,229	77,600	11,169	330,659	

Out of the nearly 400 write-in votes, almost half or 184 (representing about one Democratic voter in 2,000) were some form or spelling of Mayor Michael Bloomberg.

== General election ==
=== Candidates ===
- Michael Bloomberg, incumbent mayor since 2002 (Independence/Jobs & Education and Republican)
- Stephen Christopher, pastor at Memorial Baptist Church in Park Slope
- Joseph Dobrian, journalist and talk show host (Libertarian)
- Tyrrell Eiland, architect (New Voice)
- Dan Fein, candidate for comptroller in 2005 (Socialist Workers)
- John M. Finan, businessman and Libertarian Party candidate for president in 2008 (Independent)
- Jimmy McMillan, war veteran and candidate for mayor in 2005 (Rent is 2 Damn High)
- Jonny Porkpie, burlesque performer (Independent)
- Billy Talen, reverend (Green)
- Bill Thompson, New York City comptroller since 2002 (Democratic and Working Families)
- Frances Villar, Lehman College student activist (Socialism and Liberation)

==== Withdrew ====
- Robert Burck, street performer known as the Naked Cowboy (withdrew September 2009)

=== Debates ===
2009 New York City mayoral election debates
No.	Date	Host	Moderator	Link	Independent	Democratic
Key: P Participant A Absent N Not invited I Invited W Withdrawn						
Key: P Participant A Absent N Not invited I Invited W Withdrawn					Michael Bloomberg	Bill Thompson
1	Oct. 13, 2009	Citizens Union, New York One; New York One Noticias; New York Daily News; New York City Campaign Finance Board; WNYC-FM	Dominic Carter	YouTube	P	P
2	Oct. 27, 2009	1010 WINS; League of Women Voters of New York City; New York City Campaign Finance Board; Univision, and WABC-TV	Bill Ritter	YouTube	P	P

=== Endorsements ===
In the final weeks of the campaign, Bloomberg was endorsed "enthusiastically" by the New York Times, which—while calling Thompson a "worthy opponent"—praised Bloomberg for handling city matters "astonishingly well". Most other local newspapers had preceded the Times in endorsing the mayor, but many did so tepidly, presaging the misgivings of The New Yorker. In a report filed days before the election, the magazine likened Bloomberg to Marcus Licinius Crassus:

The Mayor has ruled us well, but he has infantilized us. We are a little too much like Romans of Crassus' day, when the institutions of the old republic were giving way to a despotic (and competent) imperium.... If Bloomberg had been satisfied with two terms, he would be leaving office a beloved legend, a municipal god. He'll get his third, but we'll give it to him sullenly... The Pax Bloombergiana will endure a while longer. But then what? Will we have forgotten how to govern ourselves?

— Hendrik Hertzberg, The New Yorker

=== Polling ===
==== Post-primary match-up ====
Source	Date	Bloomberg (ind.-R-Indep'ce)	Thompson (D-Working Families)	Christopher (Conservative)
Nov. 3 results	November 24, 2009	50.7%	46.3%	1.6%
SurveyUSA	October 30, 2009	53%	42%	
Marist	October 30, 2009	53%	38%	
Quinnipiac	October 26, 2009	53%	35%	3%
SurveyUSA	October 19, 2009	53%	41%	
SurveyUSA	October 12, 2009	55%	38%	
Daily News	October 6, 2009	51%	43%	
Quinnipiac	September 24, 2009	52%	36%	2%
Marist	September 17, 2009	52%	43%	
Quinnipiac	August 26, 2009	50%	35%	
Quinnipiac	July 21, 2009	47%	37%	
Marist	June 29, 2009	48%	35%	
Quinnipiac	June 9, 2009	54%	32%	
NY1	May 12, 2009	47%	31%	
Marist	May 5, 2009	51%	33%	
Quinnipiac	March 17, 2009	49%	35%	
Quinnipiac	February 17, 2009	50%	33%	
Quinnipiac	January 20, 2009	50%	34%	
NY1	January 20, 2009	45%	32%	

==== Bloomberg vs. Avella ====
Source	Date	Bloomberg (ind)	Avella (D)
Quinnipiac	July 21, 2009	51%	28%
Marist	June 29, 2009	53%	29%
Quinnipiac	June 9, 2009	57%	27%
Marist	May 5, 2009	52%	27%

==== Bloomberg approval ratings ====
Source	Date	Approval rating	Disapproval rating
Quinnipiac	July 21, 2009	63%	29%
Quinnipiac	July 9, 2009	66%	27%
Marist	June 29, 2009	58%	40%

Source	Date	Bloomberg Deserves Reelection	Time for a New Mayor
Marist Poll	July 8, 2009	44%	51%

=== Results ===
New York City mayoral general election, 2009
Party	Candidate	Votes	%
Republican	Michael Bloomberg	435,393	37.70
Independence/Jobs & Education Party	Michael Bloomberg	150,073	12.99
Total	Michael Bloomberg (incumbent)	585,466	50.69
Democratic	Bill Thompson	506,995	43.90
Working Families	Bill Thompson	27,874	2.41
Total	Bill Thompson	534,869	46.32
Conservative	Stephen Christopher	18,013	1.56
Green	Billy Talen	8,902	0.77
Rent Is Too Damn High	Jimmy McMillan	2,332	0.20
Socialism and Liberation	Francisca Villar	1,996	0.17
Libertarian	Joseph Dobrian	1,616	0.14
Socialist Workers	Dan Fein	1,311	0.11
Write-in		297	0.03
Total valid votes		1,154,802	98.03
Rejected ballots		23,255	1.97
Total votes		1,178,057	100.0
Independent hold			

==== By borough ====
Candidate	Party	Manhattan	The Bronx	Brooklyn	Queens	Staten Island	Total	%
Michael R. Bloomberg	Republican	102,903	42,066	117,706	126,569	46,149	435,393	37.7%
Michael R. Bloomberg	Republican	35.9%	29.0%	34.6%	42.3%	55.4%	435,393	37.7%
Michael R. Bloomberg	Independence/Jobs & Education	56,934	11,730	36,033	36,364	9,012	150,073	13.0%
Michael R. Bloomberg	Independence/Jobs & Education	19.9%	8.1%	10.6%	12.2%	10.8%	150,073	13.0%
Michael R. Bloomberg	Total	159,837	53,796	153,739	162,933	55,161	585,466	50.7%
Michael R. Bloomberg	Total	55.8%	37.0%	45.1%	54.5%	66.2%	585,466	50.7%
Bill Thompson	Democratic	110,975	86,899	163,230	122,935	22,956	506,995	43.9%
Bill Thompson	Democratic	38.7%	59.8%	47.9%	41.1%	27.5%	506,995	43.9%
Bill Thompson	Working Families Party	7,676	1,946	12,461	4,711	1,080	27,874	2.4%
Bill Thompson	Working Families Party	2.7%	1.3%	3.7%	1.6%	1.3%	27,874	2.4%
Bill Thompson	Total	118,651	88,845	175,691	127,646	24,036	534,869	46.3%
Bill Thompson	Total	41.4%	61.2%	51.6%	42.7%	28.8%	534,869	46.3%
Stephen Christopher	Conservative	2,217	1,480	5,690	5,267	3,359	18,013	1.6%
Stephen Christopher	Conservative	0.8%	1.0%	1.7%	1.8%	4.0%	18,013	1.6%
Billy Talen	Green	3,083	434	3,338	1,680	367	8,902	0.8%
Billy Talen	Green	1.1%	0.3%	1.0%	0.6%	0.4%	8,902	0.8%
Jimmy McMillan	Rent Is Too High	823	217	764	404	124	2,332	0.2%
Francisca Villar	Socialism & Liberation	674	253	577	420	72	1,996	0.2%
Joseph Dobrian	Libertarian	556	104	413	388	155	1,616	0.1%
Dan Fein	Socialist Workers	493	120	376	263	59	1,311	0.1%
Write-ins †		100	30	77	60	30	297	.03%
Total recorded votes		286,434	145,279	340,665	299,061	83,363	1,154,802	100.00%
unrecorded ballots		5,172	3,659	6,645	6,254	1,525	23,255	
Total ballots cast		291,606	148,938	347,310	305,315	84,888	1,178,057	
†The three candidates who received more than 7 write-in votes each were C. Montgomery Burns (Homer Simpson's fictional boss), 27; City Councilman Tony Avella (who lost the Democratic mayoral primary), 13; and former Mayor Rudy Giuliani (Republican), 11.
Source: Board of Elections in the City of New York, November 24, 2009

== See also ==
- 2009 New York City Public Advocate election
- 2009 New York City Comptroller election
- 2013 New York City mayoral election
- 2005 New York City mayoral election
- 2001 New York City mayoral election
- New York City mayoral elections
