= Bill Thompson (New York politician) =

American politician

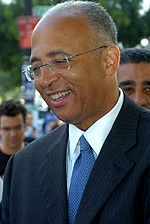

42nd Comptroller of New York City
- In office January 1, 2002 – December 31, 2009
- Mayor: Michael Bloomberg
- Preceded by: Alan Hevesi
- Succeeded by: John Liu

Personal details
- Born: William Colridge Thompson Jr. July 10, 1953 (age 73) New York City, New York, U.S.
- Party: Democratic
- Spouse: Elsie McCabe
- Children: 2
- Education: Tufts University (BA)

William Colridge Thompson Jr. (born July 10, 1953) is an American politician who served as the 42nd Comptroller of New York City; sworn into office on January 1, 2002, he was reelected to serve a second term that began on January 1, 2006. He did not seek re-election in 2009. Instead he ran for mayor, and he was succeeded as comptroller by John Liu. On June 15, 2016, Thompson was appointed by New York State Governor Andrew Cuomo as chairman of the board of trustees of the City University of New York; his term ended in June 2022. He was reappointed by Governor Kathy Hochul as Chairperson of the Board of Trustees of the City University of New York on June 15, 2023. His term ends June 2029.

Thompson ran unsuccessfully in the 2009 election for Mayor of New York as the nominee of the Democratic and Working Families parties, and he unsuccessfully sought the Democratic nomination in the 2013 election for mayor.

== Early life and education ==
Thompson was born and raised in the Bedford-Stuyvesant neighborhood of Brooklyn. He is the son of Elaine Thompson, a New York City public-school teacher, and William C. Thompson Sr., formerly a prominent Brooklyn Democratic Party leader, City Councilman, State Senator and judge on New York Supreme Court, Appellate Division. His grandparents immigrated to New York City from Saint Kitts and Nevis in the Caribbean. Thompson attended Midwood High School, a public school in Brooklyn, and graduated from Tufts University in 1974.

== Career ==
Upon his graduation from Tufts University in 1974, until 1982, Thompson served as the special assistant and chief of staff to former Brooklyn Democratic Rep. Fred Richmond, who pleaded guilty to income tax evasion, marijuana possession and making an illegal payment to a government employee and who resigned his seat pursuant to a plea agreement in 1982. Later, Thompson became the youngest Brooklyn Deputy Borough President. As deputy to Borough President Howard Golden, Thompson was Golden's designee to the New York City Board of Estimate. Following the Crown Heights riots, Thompson worked to fix the racial divide that had paralyzed Brooklyn.

As a member of the New York City Board of Education, from 1994 to 2001, and a five-term president, from 1996 until 2001, Thompson worked for centralized management of the public school system. Thompson also fought for better after-school programs, improved teacher quality, and an expanded arts curriculum.

While serving the board of education, Thompson also worked as a political consultant, the director of Keyspan Energy (now National Grid USA), and director of a financial firm headed by Michael. W. Geffrard, a former deputy city comptroller. Thompson resigned from the board of education in March 2001 to run for the office of Comptroller.

Thompson has also served on the boards of the American Museum of Natural History, Brooklyn Children's Museum, Queens Public Library, New York Wildlife Conservation Society and each New York City Business improvement district.

== New York City comptroller (2002–2009) ==
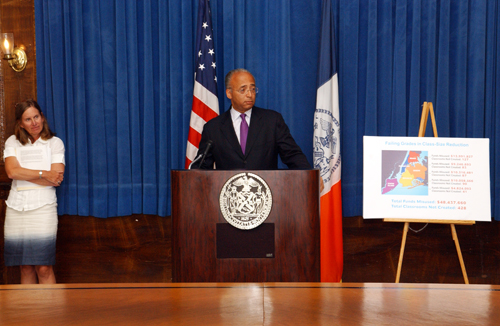
A 2009 press conference with then comptroller Thompson

In the role of City of New York's chief financial officer, Thompson led a team of 720 employees, managed a $66 million annual operating budget and the country's 5th largest pension fund, a multibillion-dollar fund that was rated among the top 20 in the world. As New York City Comptroller, Thompson was the custodian and investment advisor to the five boards of trustees of the Five New York City Pension Funds, which included the New York City Employee's Retirement System; the Teachers' Retirement System of the City of New York; the New York City Police Pension Fund; the New York City Fire Department Pension Fund; and the New York City Board of Education Retirement System. Thompson worked to diversify the pension portfolio from primarily public equities into private equity, real estate and other asset classes, and since 2003, the funds grew at a pace of 12.33 percent a year, outperforming its actuarial return assumption of 8 percent. In addition, during Thompson's tenure, assets managed by minority-and-women-owned firms increased from less than $2 billion to over $6 billion.

Thompson called on American firms in the pension portfolio – including Halliburton and General Electric – to document the impact of their businesses on the environment. He advocated that companies doing business in Northern Ireland embrace the goal of equal opportunity employment and supported efforts to prohibit workplace discrimination based upon sexual orientation. Since, funds reinvested in New York City, leading to the creation and rehabilitation of more than 20,000 units of affordable housing, the development of thousands of square feet of commercial space, and investments related to creating clean and renewable sources of energy.

In 2003, Thompson led the effort to deposit $200 million in city funds to establish new bank branches in traditionally underserved neighborhoods, enabling more New Yorkers to open checking accounts and apply for business loans and mortgages. Thompson has developed a number of community service and education programs to help New Yorkers deal with the challenges of the economic crisis. These programs include consumer banking days (regular events that take place in every borough and feature workshops addressing savings and credit issues), predatory lending reforms and general investment strategies.

In an analysis of Thompson's use of the comptroller's office to audit city government, the on-line journal City Limits opined that "Thompson has not been a ferocious antagonist to Mayor Michael Bloomberg. Instead, he has mostly praised the mayor's budgets, smiled on his economic policies and hailed Bloomberg's accomplishments with the city's schools." However, City Limits reported the Comptroller's office and the Bloomberg administration in fact engaged in hundreds of "low-level skirmishes" over the Comptroller's audits of city agencies and programs, although Thompson did not audit the mayor's office and mayoral agencies as often as his predecessor, Alan Hevesi, under Mayor Rudolph Giuliani. City Limits concluded "the jury is still out on the impact Thompson's audits on city services."

== 2009 mayoral election ==
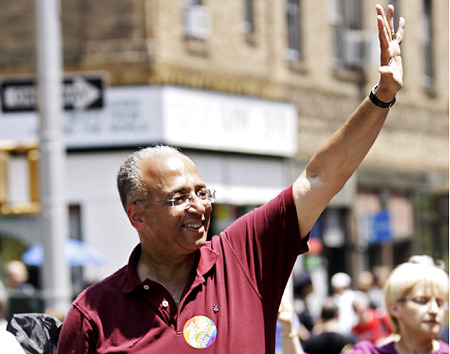
Thompson in 2009

Thompson was opposed by Tony Avella, a New York City Councilman from Queens, for the Democratic nomination to run in November 2009 against incumbent mayor Michael Bloomberg. On September 15, 2009, Thompson overwhelmingly won the Democratic nomination, defeating Avella by 70 points.

On July 9, 2009, Thompson was endorsed by the Working Families Party.

On July 21, 2009, the Comptroller's office released a report suggesting the Bloomberg administration had falsely inflated graduation rates in city schools. Thompson's report did not demonstrate any conclusive evidence of manipulation, "saying only that a lack of oversight, coupled with intense pressure to push up the graduation rate, created the potential for abuse." Thompson also criticized Bloomberg's managerial style as creating incentives for schools to graduate unqualified students. The New York City Department of Education released a 38-page rebuttal to Thompson's allegations. In addition on July 21, 2009, Thompson said on NY1 that School's Chancellor Joel Klein should be fired, referring to his Department of Education as "The Enron of American education. Showing the gains and hiding the losses.". It was reported that on October 29, 2009, the principal of Lehman High School was being investigated for granting students credits inappropriately and graduating students without them having completed the required course work. Thompson reiterated once again that the mayoral control of schools breeds abuse.

Thompson's 2009 mayoral candidacy received endorsements from President Barack Obama, both of New York's U.S. Senators (Chuck Schumer and Kirsten Gillibrand), Governor David Paterson, Attorney General Andrew Cuomo, U.S. Congressmen Anthony Weiner and Charlie Rangel, John Liu, Bill de Blasio, David Yassky, Rev. Al Sharpton, Fernando Ferrer, Ruben Diaz Jr. and former mayor David Dinkins, among others.

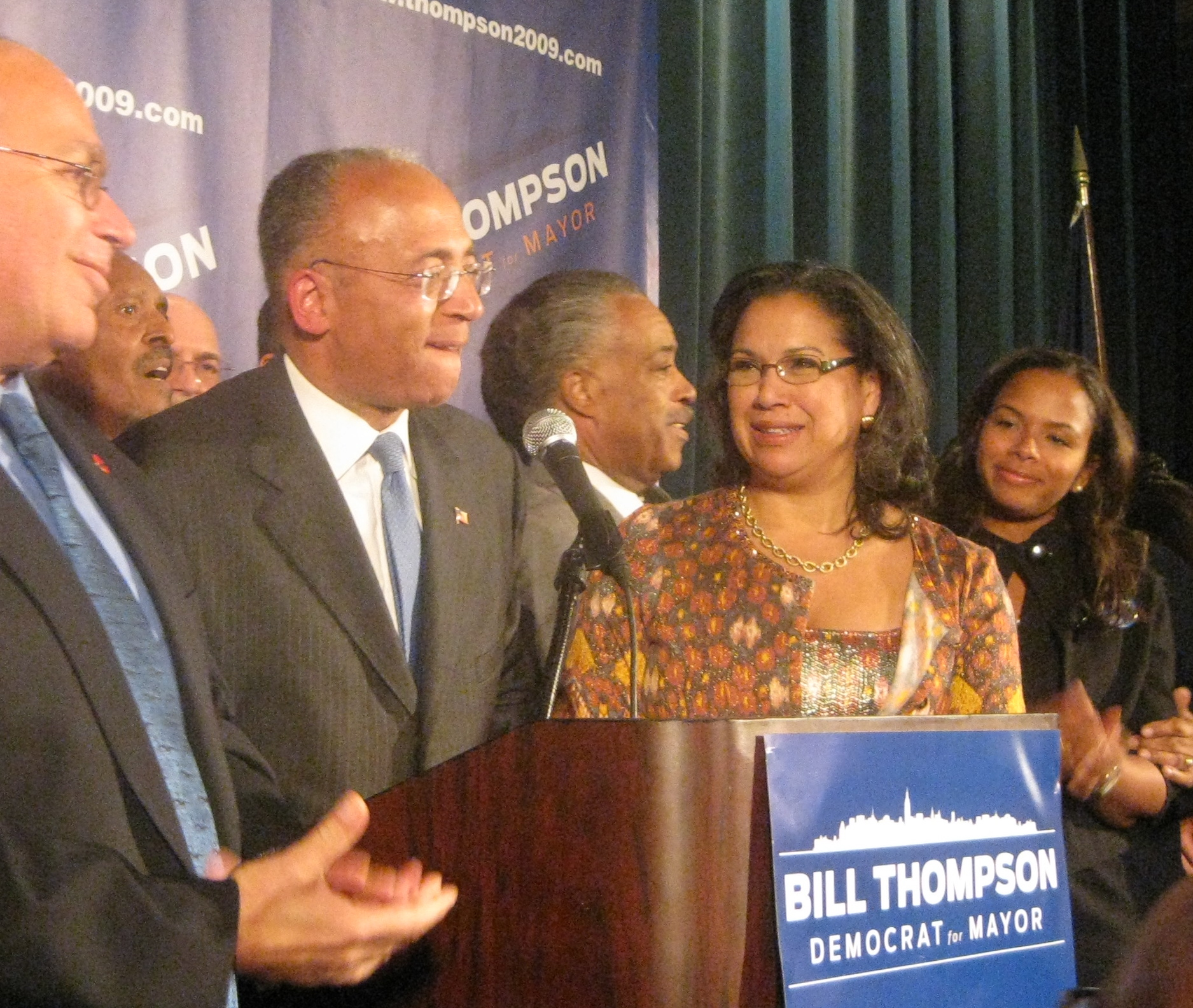
Thompson delivers his concession speech after losing the mayoral election.

District Council 37, the city's largest union, endorsed Thompson on August 13, 2009, giving Thompson "crucial labor support" according to the New York Times. The union, representing 125,000 workers and 50,000 retirees, endorsed Bloomberg in 2005. On June 19, 2013, the United Federation of Teachers delegates voted to support Thompson. Other unions that endorsed Thompson include the International Brotherhood of Electrical Workers Local Union #3, FDNY-EMS Emergency Medical Technicians, Paramedics and Fire Inspectors Union Local 2507, the FDNY-EMS Officers Union Local 3621, the Retail, Wholesale and Department Store Union (RWDSU, UFCW), Allied International Union, Amalgamated Transit Union Local 1056/1181, Local 891, International Union of Operating Engineers, Civil Service Employees Association Local 1000, Communications Workers of America (CWA) District 1, International Association of Machinists District 15, International Brotherhood of Teamsters, Local 808, Local 94 of the International Union of Operating Engineers, The Associated Musicians of Greater New York, Local 802 AFM, and Transport Workers Union (TWU) Local 100.

As of October 6, 2009, Mayor Bloomberg's lead over Thompson had shrunk to 8%.

Thompson's mayoral campaign against Bloomberg in 2009 was close, but on November 3, 2009, Bloomberg won a third term by edging out Thompson by 4.6 percent.

== Inter-mayoral election years 2010–2012 ==
In 2010, Thompson joined Siebert Brandford Shank & Co., L.L.C. – the largest African-American, woman and Latino owned investment banking firm in the country, handling more than $2 trillion in infrastructure financing. He became a partner in 2015.

In 2010, New York State Governor David Paterson appointed Thompson chairman of the Board of The Hugh L. Carey Battery Park City Authority (BPCA) – a Class A public-benefit corporation created by New York State in 1968 to redevelop outmoded and deteriorated piers, a project that has involved reclaiming the land and facilitating new construction of mixed commercial and residential community uses. Thompson held the position until 2012, previously serving on the New York State Gaming Facility Location Board, and, since 2011, he has chaired Governor Andrew Cuomo's MWBE Task Force.

== 2013 mayoral election ==
Thompson announced his intention to run again for mayor as a Democrat in 2013, when the seat will next be up for election. Unlike his 2009 campaign, there was no incumbent in the race in 2013, as New York's term-limits law prohibited Mayor Bloomberg from running for a fourth term. New York State Board of Regents Chancellor Merryl Tisch joined his campaign in April, as campaign chairwoman.

According to the New York City Campaign Finance Board's website, as of the March 2013 filing deadline Thompson had raised over $2.7 million in private funds, fourth among registered Democratic contenders, and fifth overall. According to a report in the New York Times, former New York Republican U.S. Senator Al D'Amato was Thompson's largest financial backer as of May 2013.

Thompson lost the Democratic primary election for mayoral candidate to Bill de Blasio, coming in second place with 26.2% of the vote.

Since 2015, Thompson has served as chairman of the New York State Housing Finance Agency, chairman of the State of New York Mortgage Agency, and since 2016, chairman of the City University of New York board of trustees. He is trustee emeritus of Tufts University (2003–2008) and KeySpan/Brooklyn Union Gas Company. Thompson was selected by the NYS Governor to head NYC's Battery Park City Authority.

== Personal life ==
A lifelong Brooklyn resident, Thompson moved to Harlem in 2008 after marrying Elsie McCabe Thompson, a Harvard-trained lawyer and the former president of the Museum for African Art as well as former chief of staff to Mayor David Dinkins.

== See also ==
- New York City Comptroller
- New York City mayoral election, 2009
- New York City mayoral election, 2013

Political offices
Preceded by Alan Hevesi	Comptroller of New York City; 2002–2010	Succeeded by John Liu
Party political offices
Preceded by Fernando Ferrer	Democratic nominee for Mayor of New York; 2009	Succeeded by Bill de Blasio
Preceded by Fernando Ferrer	Working Families nominee for Mayor of New York; 2009	Succeeded by Bill de Blasio
