= Citizens Union =

American government watchdog group

- Formation: 1897; 129 years ago
- Purpose: Good government
- Headquarters: New York City
- Location: New York, NY
- Region served: New York State
- Executive Director: John Avlon
- Subsidiaries: Citizens Union of the City of New York is a 501(c)(4) membership organization Citizens Union Foundation is a 501(c)(3) charitable organization
- Website: citizensunion.org

Citizens Union is a New York City-based good government group founded in 1897 to combat the influences of the Tammany Hall political machine. J. Pierpont Morgan, Benjamin Altman, Elihu Root, and Carl Schurz numbered among its 165 founders. In 1987, on the 90th anniversary of the organization's founding, The New York Times called Citizens Union "one of the most venerated 'good government' groups in New York City."

In 1902, Citizens Union supported Columbia University president Seth Low in his successful campaign to become mayor of New York. Six years later, in 1908, the organization transitioned from a political party to a nonpartisan government watchdog.

By 1918, the group had formally dropped any political affiliation and committed itself solely to reforming and modernizing government. Citizens Union was involved in promoting investigations into corruption, participating in charter revision commissions, and advocating for permanent voter registration. The organization's voter directory, first published in 1910, became one of its most visible public activities.

By 1987, Citizens Union had a membership of 2,000 and a staff of six. Although its influence had declined during the previous two decades, the organization experienced a resurgence following a series of city corruption scandals. Under the leadership of chairman Robert F. Wagner Jr., Citizens Union expanded its membership and adopted a more activist approach. The group's activities included research projects, public forums, lobbying for electoral reforms, and the continued publication of its voter directory, which by then distributed 20,000 copies annually to libraries, schools, senior centers, and apartment buildings. Citizens Union's “Preferred” designation for political candidates was regarded as a prestigious endorsement in New York City elections.

It has published a voter directory every year since 1910, and in 1948 began publishing reports on city politics and reporting on issues of political transparency. In 1999, Citizens Union Foundation launched the Gotham Gazette, a New York publication focused on city and state government.

Former executive directors of Citizens Union include William Jay Schieffelin, who served as president from 1908 to 1941 and helped establish the organization's role as a leading advocate for good government reforms in New York City. During his tenure, he actively campaigned for public scrutiny of judicial appointments and was a prominent figure in the hearings that led to the resignation of Mayor James J. Walker. In more recent years, Dick Dadey served as executive director from 2004 to 2017, during which he expanded Citizens Union's focus on campaign finance reform and government transparency. Betsy Gotbaum, former New York City Public Advocate, succeeded Dadey in 2018 and emphasized strengthening democracy and increasing voter participation during her tenure. In 2025, journalist Grace Rauh was appointed executive director, succeeding Gotbaum.

Prominent New Yorkers who have served on Citizens Union's board of directors include former New York State Attorney General Robert Abrams, New York Law School Dean Anthony Crowell, Columbia Law School professor Richard Briffault, and journalist and political analyst John Avlon, who currently serves as chair of the board.
