= Joe Biden 2020 presidential campaign =

American political campaign

Joe Biden for President 2020
- Campaign: 2020 Democratic primaries 2020 U.S. presidential election
- Candidate: Joe Biden; 47th vice president of the United States; (2009–2017); Kamala Harris; U.S. senator from California; (2017–2021)
- Affiliation: Democratic Party
- Status: Announced: April 25, 2019; Official launch: May 18, 2019; Presumptive nomination: April 8, 2020; Secured nomination: June 5, 2020; Official nominee: August 18, 2020; Election day: November 3, 2020; Projected victory: November 7, 2020; Certification: January 7, 2021; Inaugurated: January 20, 2021
- Headquarters: Philadelphia, Pennsylvania
- Key people: Cedric Richmond (National Co-Chair); Eric Garcetti (National Co-Chair); Lisa Blunt Rochester (National Co-Chair); Gretchen Whitmer (National Co-Chair); Steve Ricchetti (campaign chairman); Mike Donilon (chief strategist); Jen O'Malley Dillon (campaign manager); Pete Kavanaugh (deputy campaign manager); Kate Bedingfield (communications director, deputy campaign manager); Anthony Bernal (deputy campaign manager); Valerie Biden Owens (senior advisor); Anita Dunn (senior advisor); Greg Schultz (senior advisor); Symone Sanders (senior advisor); Cristóbal Alex (senior advisor); Brandon English (senior advisor); TJ Ducklo (national press secretary); Erin Wilson (national political director); Katie Petrelius (national finance director)
- Receipts: US$1,064,613,463.22 (November 23, 2020)
- Slogan(s): Battle for the Soul of the Nation; Our Best Days Still Lie Ahead; No Malarkey! Build Back Better; Unite for a Better America

Website
- joebiden.com (archived - August 31, 2020)

On April 25, 2019, former vice president Joe Biden released a video announcing his candidacy in the 2020 Democratic Party presidential primaries. On November 3, 2020, Biden and his running mate, Kamala Harris, defeated incumbent Republican president Donald Trump and vice president Mike Pence in the general election.

Biden, vice president of the United States from 2009 to 2017 and previously a U.S. senator from Delaware from 1973 to 2009, had been the subject of widespread speculation as a potential 2020 candidate after declining to be a candidate in 2016. His 2020 campaign positions included codifying Roe v. Wade into statute, creating a public option for health insurance, decriminalizing recreational cannabis, passing the Equality Act, providing tuition-free community college, and passing a $1.7 trillion climate plan embracing the framework of the Green New Deal. Biden supported regulation of fracking as opposed to a complete ban on the practice.

Biden entered the race with very high name recognition. From his campaign announcement up to the start of the elections, he was generally regarded as the Democratic front-runner. He led most national polls through 2019, but did not rank as one of the top three candidates in either the Iowa caucuses or the New Hampshire primary. After underperforming expectations in those contests, he suffered a decline in his polling and lost his frontrunner status to Bernie Sanders. Biden started regaining ground after winning second place in the Nevada caucuses and, on February 29, 2020, he won a landslide victory in the South Carolina Democratic primary, which reinvigorated his campaign. In March, ten of Biden's former competitors endorsed him, bringing the total number of such endorsements to twelve. Biden earned enough delegates on Super Tuesday to pull ahead of Sanders. On April 8, after Sanders suspended his campaign, Biden became the presumptive Democratic presidential nominee.

In June, Biden reached the required number of delegates to become the nominee. On August 11, Biden announced that U.S. senator Harris would be his vice presidential running mate. On August 18 and 19, Biden and Harris were officially nominated at the Democratic National Convention. Throughout the 2020 election, national opinion polls conducted generally showed Biden leading Trump in favorability. On Election Day, the Biden-Harris ticket defeated the Trump-Pence ticket. Biden's narrow wins in the blue wall states of Michigan, Pennsylvania, and Wisconsin were considered key to his victory. These states all had swings from voters who had previously voted for Trump in 2016 yet went for Biden in 2020. Biden and Harris won the popular vote, and won the electoral vote by a margin of 306–232. Biden and Harris were sworn in on January 20, 2021.

== Background ==
=== Previous presidential campaigns ===
Biden's 2020 presidential campaign was his third attempt to seek election for president of the United States. His first campaign was made in the 1988 Democratic Party primaries where he was initially considered one of the potentially strongest candidates. However, newspapers revealed plagiarism by Biden in law school records and in speeches, a scandal which led to his withdrawal from the race in September 1987.

He made the second attempt during the 2008 Democratic Party primaries, where he focused on his plan to achieve political success in the Iraq War through a system of federalization. Like his first presidential bid, Biden failed to garner endorsements and support. He withdrew from the race after his poor performance in the Iowa caucus on January 3, 2008. He was eventually chosen by Barack Obama as his running mate and won the general election as vice president of the United States, being sworn in on January 20, 2009.

=== Speculation ===
Vice President Biden was seen as a potential candidate to succeed President Barack Obama in the 2016 presidential election. On October 21, 2015, following the death of his son Beau, Biden announced that he would not seek the Democratic presidential nomination in 2016.

During a tour of the U.S. Senate with reporters on December 5, 2016, Biden refused to rule out a potential bid for the presidency in the 2020 presidential election. He reasserted his ambivalence about running on an appearance of The Late Show with Stephen Colbert on December 7, in which he stated "never say never" about running for president in 2020, while also admitting he did not see a scenario in which he would run for office again. He seemingly announced on January 13, 2017, exactly one week prior to the expiration of his vice presidential term, that he would not run. However, four days later, he seemed to backtrack, stating "I'll run if I can walk." In September 2017, Biden's daughter Ashley indicated her belief that he was thinking about running in 2020.

=== Political action committee ===
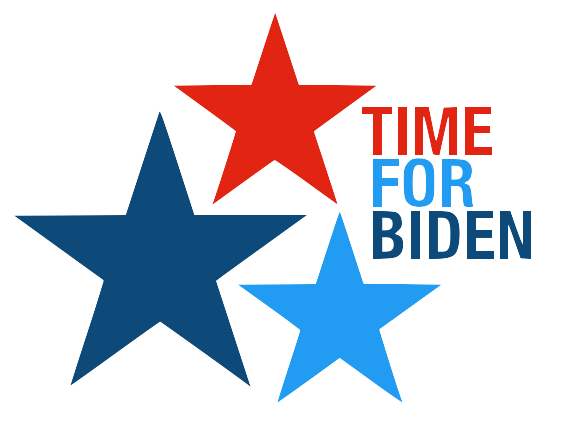

American Possibilities, a political action committee created by Biden in June 2017.

Time for Biden, a political action committee formed in January 2018, seeking Biden's entry into the 2020 Democratic Party presidential primaries.

=== Considering his options ===
In February 2018, Biden informed a group of longtime foreign policy aides that he was "keeping his 2020 options open".

In March 2018, Politico reported that Biden's team was considering a number of options to distinguish their campaign, such as announcing at the outset a younger vice presidential candidate from outside of politics, and also reported that Biden had rejected a proposition to commit to serving only one term as president. On July 17, 2018, he told a forum held in Bogota, Colombia, that he would decide if he would formally declare as a candidate by January 2019. On February 4, with no decision having been forthcoming from Biden, Edward-Isaac Dovere of The Atlantic wrote that Biden was "very close to saying yes" but that some close to him are worried he will have a last-minute change of heart, as he did in 2016. Dovere reported that Biden was concerned about the effect another presidential run could have on his family and reputation, as well as fundraising struggles and perceptions about his age and relative centrism compared to other declared and potential candidates. Conversely, his "sense of duty", offense at the Trump presidency, the lack of foreign policy experience among other Democratic hopefuls and his desire to foster "bridge-building progressivism" in the party were said to be factors prompting him to run.

== Campaign ==
=== Announcement ===
Biden campaign logo during the primaries and prior to selection of Kamala Harris as running mate.

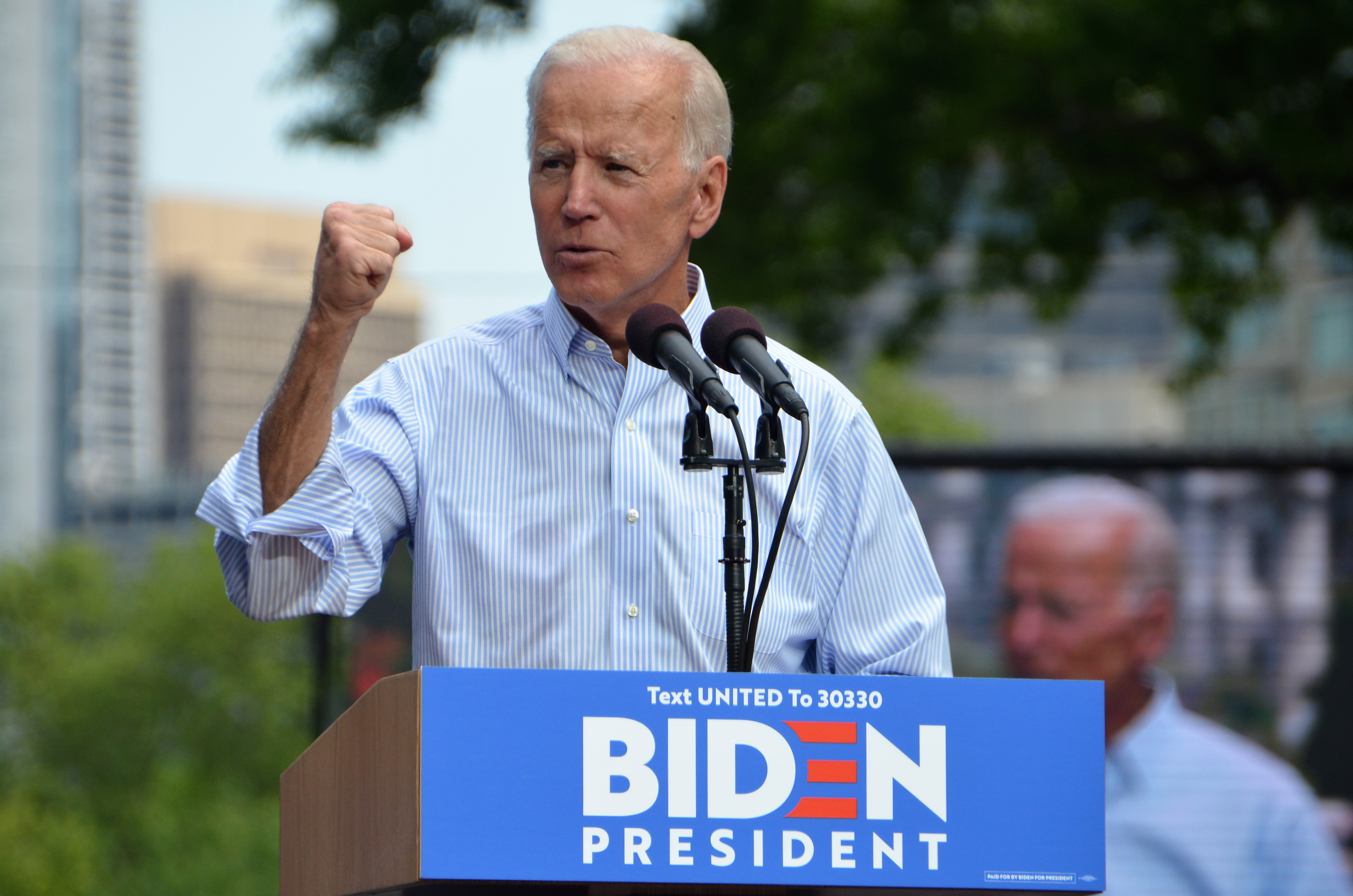
Biden speaking at the campaign's kickoff event in Philadelphia, Pennsylvania

On March 17, 2019, at a dinner in Dover, Delaware, Biden accidentally revealed that he would run for president in 2020.

On April 19, 2019, The Atlantic reported that Biden planned to officially announce his campaign five days later via a video announcement, followed by a launch rally in Philadelphia, Pennsylvania, or Charlottesville, Virginia. Subsequent reports indicated that Biden's plans remained uncertain, with no known launch date, locations for campaign rallies, or permits for an event in Philadelphia. On April 23, it was reported that Biden would formally enter the race two days later.

On April 25, 2019, Biden released a video announcing his candidacy for president of the United States. Following a three-week tour, Biden held a campaign rally in Philadelphia on May 18, 2019.

On May 22, the magazine Ebony reported that Biden had begun assembling his 2020 presidential campaign team, to be headquartered in Philadelphia. His team included campaign manager Greg Schultz and director of strategic communications Kamau Mandela Marshall, who both previously worked in the Obama administration, as well as other senior advisors from the Obama administration. Additionally, on May 31, the Biden campaign announced that Congressman Cedric Richmond would join the campaign as the national co-chairman.

==== Key people ====
- Steve Ricchetti, campaign chairman
- Mike Donilon, chief strategist
- Greg Schultz, 1st campaign manager
- Jen O'Malley Dillon, 2nd campaign manager
- Anita Dunn, senior advisor
- Symone Sanders, senior advisor
- Ron Klain, former chief of staff to the vice president, senior advisor
- Valerie Biden Owens, sister of Joe Biden, senior advisor

==== Economic policy ====
- Jeffrey Zients, former director of the National Economic Council
- Jared Bernstein, former chief economics advisor to Joe Biden
- Heather Boushey, economist
- Ben Harris, former chief economist and chief economic advisor to Vice President Joe Biden

=== Fundraising and strategy ===
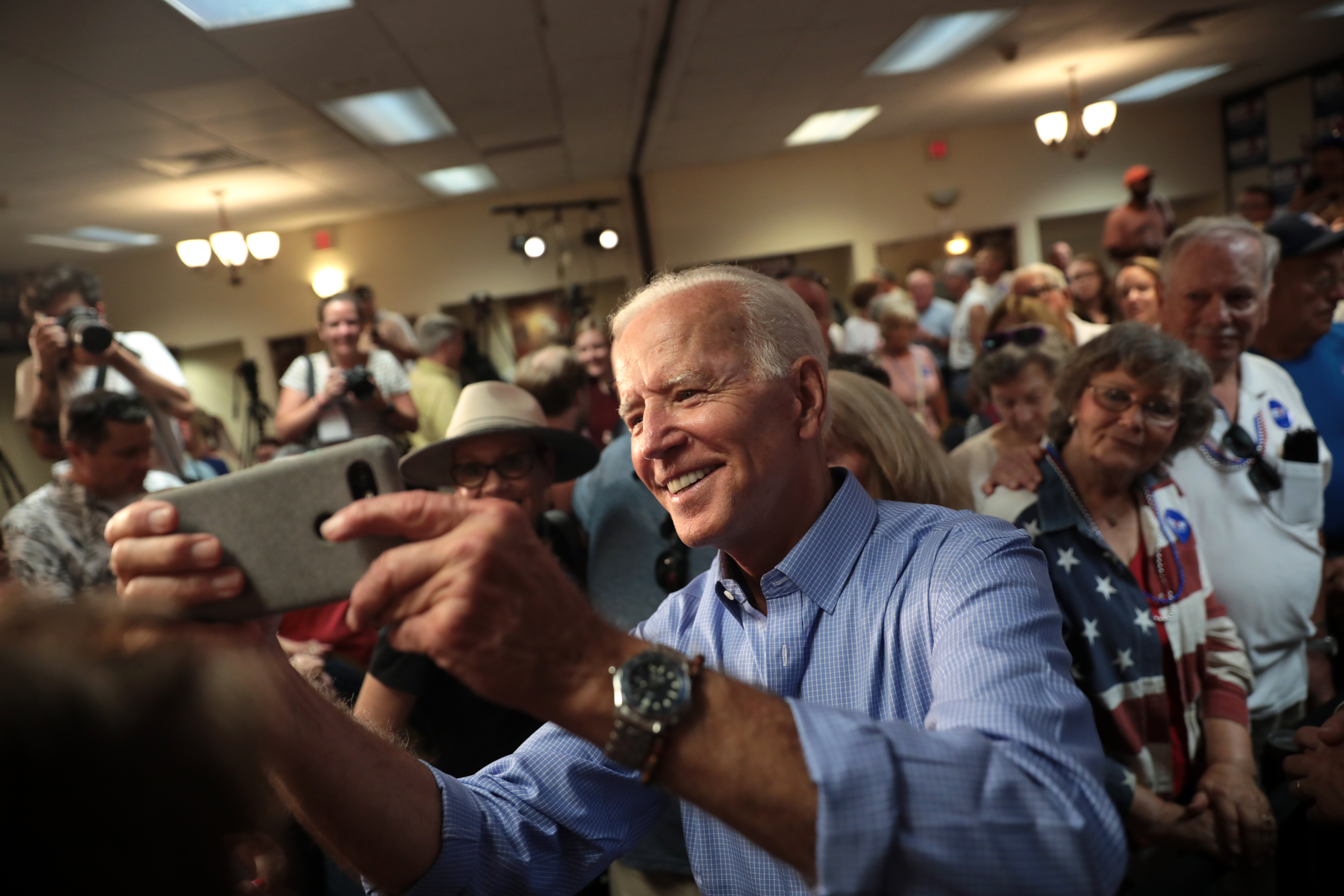
Campaigning in Marshalltown, Iowa

On April 26, 2019, Biden's campaign announced that they had raised $6.3 million in the first 24 hours, surpassing all other candidates' first 24-hour fundraising totals for the Democratic presidential nomination at that time. Biden's fundraising came from 128,000 unique contributors, equivalent to that of Beto O'Rourke's campaign, but about 40% lower than that of Bernie Sanders, who had 223,000 unique contributors in the first 24 hours of his campaign.

According to a Politico article, the Biden campaign was operating on the premise that the Democratic base is not nearly as liberal or youthful as perceived. Privately, several Biden advisers acknowledged that their theory was based on polling data and voting trends, contending that the media is pushing the idea of a hyper-progressive Democratic electorate being propagated by a Twitter bubble and being out of touch with the average rank-and-file Democrat. In April 2019, Biden told reporters, "The fact of the matter is the vast majority of the members of the Democratic Party are still basically liberal to moderate Democrats in the traditional sense." Biden also described himself as an "Obama-Biden Democrat". An unspecified Biden adviser said, "There's a big disconnect between the media narrative and what the primary electorate looks like and thinks, versus the media narrative and the Twitter narrative [and] the Democratic primary universe is far less liberal. It's older than you think it is." From April 25 to May 25, 2019, Biden's campaign spent 83% of his total $1.2 million Facebook ad funding on targeting voters 45 years and older. No other top 2020 Democratic candidate has pursued a similar strategy in the primary.

Biden, along with Bernie Sanders, was often perceived as the candidate with the best chance of defeating Donald Trump in the general election. According to The Washington Post, this may be because of his more moderate policies, or it may be because voters or party leaders believe a white male candidate is more "electable". Joe Biden said that his late son Beau should be running instead of him if he were alive. Biden led most national polls through 2019. The Biden campaign came to rely on volunteer groups such as the Biden Digital Coalition for their social media presence and for tracking disinformation.

The campaign raised $70 million during the 2020 Democratic National Convention. The campaign and DNC combined raised a record $365 million in August 2020, compared to $154 million by Trump and the RNC. Biden raised another $383 million in September 2020, breaking his own record from the previous month.

=== Early primary election results ===
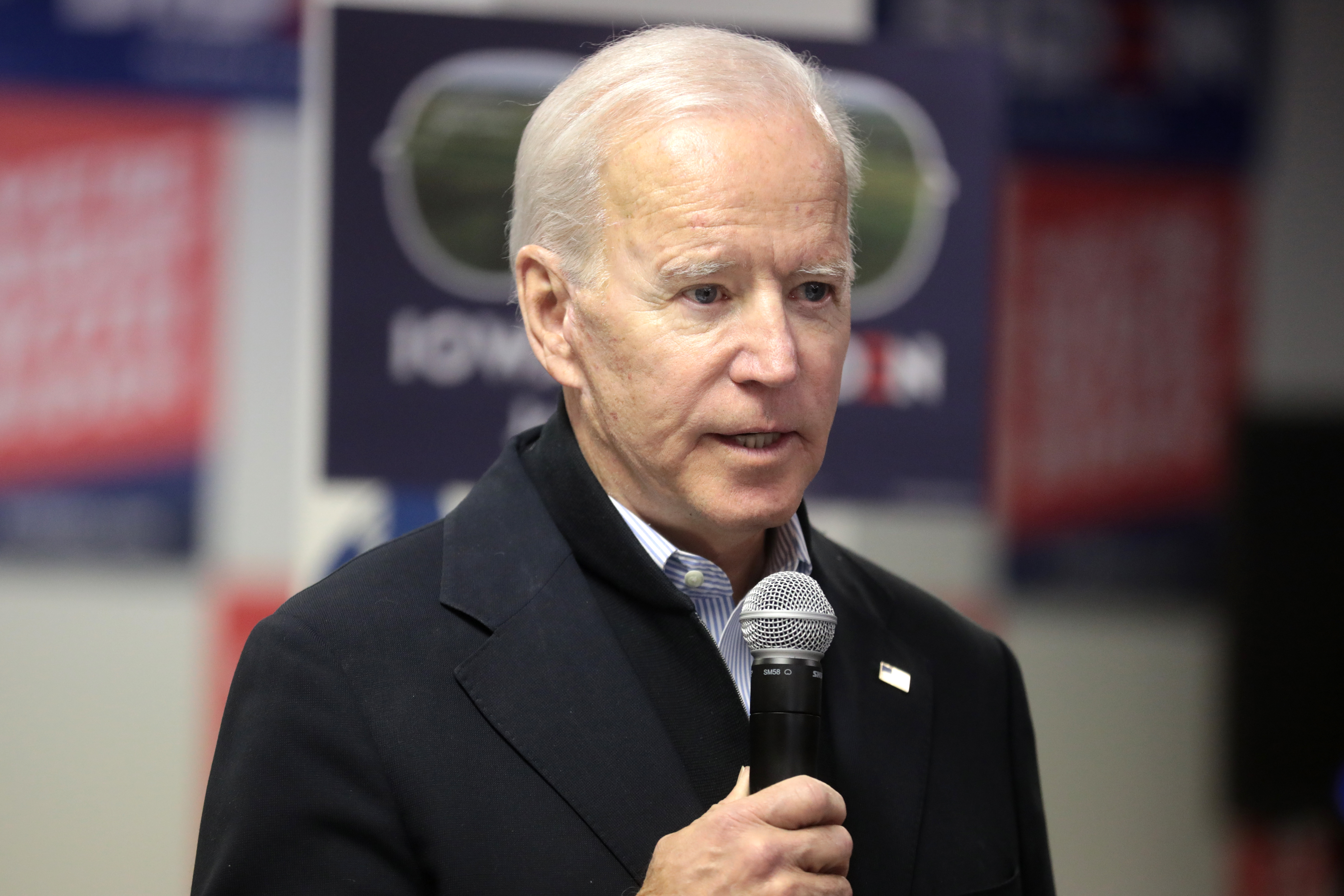
Biden speaking at a campaign event in Des Moines, Iowa

During the Iowa caucuses held on February 3, 2020, Biden came in fourth place, earning six pledged delegates. In the New Hampshire primary held on February 11, Biden came in fifth place and did not earn any delegates due to his failure to meet the required 15% eligibility threshold. After poor showings in Iowa and New Hampshire, some media outlets questioned whether Biden's status as the most electable candidate was accurate. Biden subsequently finished a distant second in the Nevada caucuses held on February 22, but his campaign viewed his large support among black voters in the state as a sign of strength heading into the South Carolina primary.

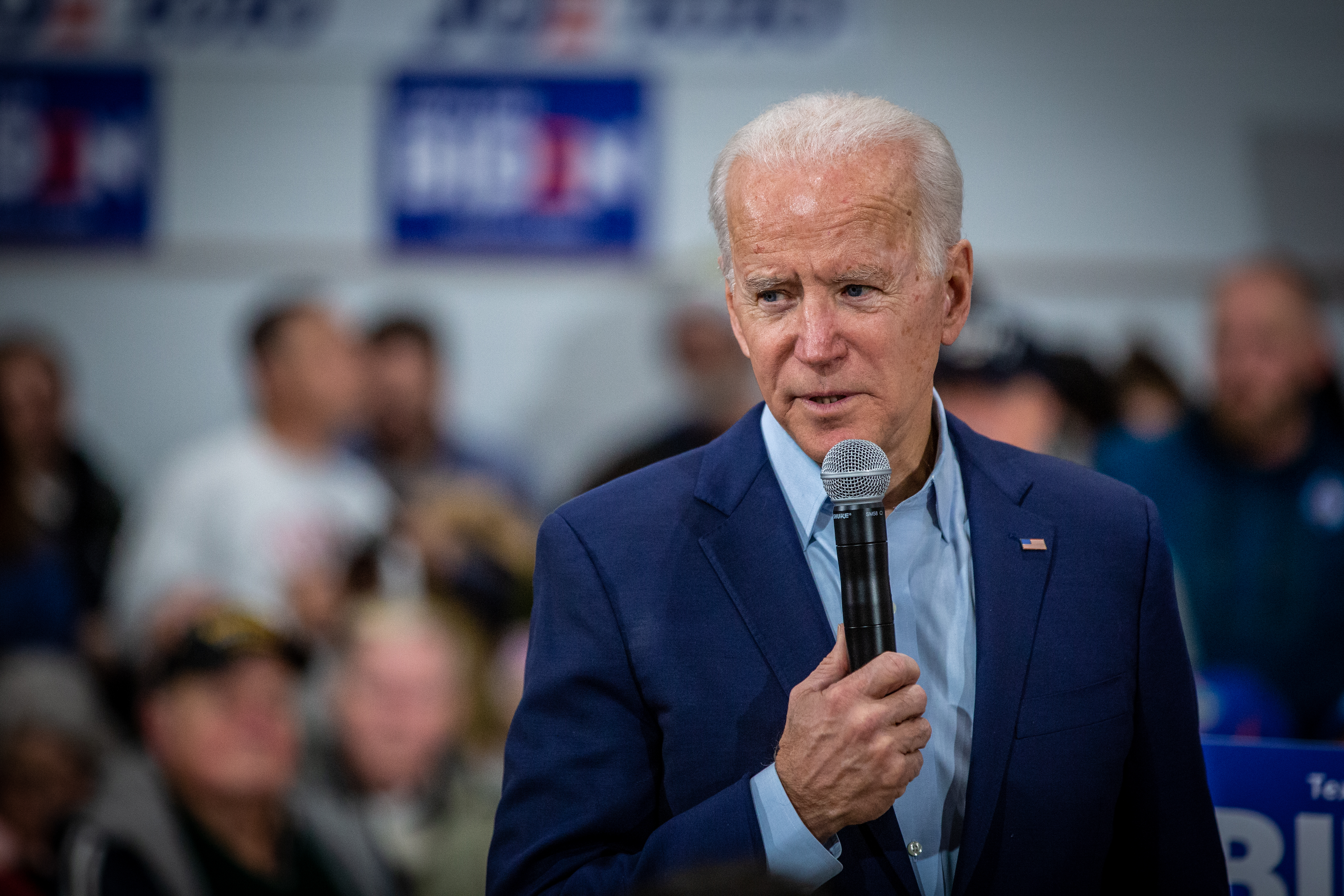
Biden speaking to voters in Iowa

Biden won the South Carolina primary election held on February 29. Biden won all 46 counties in the state, winning 48.7% of the popular vote and earning 39 delegates. The win was largely attributed to his support from 61% of African-American voters (African-American voters make up approximately 60% of the Democratic electorate in South Carolina). Before the primary on February 26, Jim Clyburn endorsed Biden. Many cited Clyburn's endorsement as a reason for Biden's wide margin of victory, as Clyburn's endorsement is a deciding factor for many African American voters in South Carolina. Thirty-six percent of all primary voters said that they made their decision after Clyburn's endorsement; of that total, 70% voted for Biden. According to FiveThirtyEight, the outcome significantly boosted Biden's chance of winning multiple Super Tuesday states (especially southern states like North Carolina, Texas, and Virginia).

In early March, shortly before Super Tuesday, Pete Buttigieg and Amy Klobuchar dropped out of the race and endorsed Biden, widely perceived as attempts to slow down Sanders' momentum in the primaries. Beto O'Rourke, Cory Booker and Kamala Harris, who had all suspended their campaign months before, also endorsed Biden at around the same time. On the Super Tuesday primary elections on March 3, Biden won Alabama, Arkansas, Maine, Massachusetts, Minnesota, North Carolina, Oklahoma, Tennessee, Texas, and Virginia, earning a total of 458 delegates, and pulling ahead of Bernie Sanders in the race. According to an exit poll, Biden received a substantial amount of support from voters who made up their minds in the last few days before the election. Late voters also preferred a candidate who they believed could defeat Trump more than one who agreed with them on issues. Biden's strong Super Tuesday performance led him to say he had "Joementum."

On March 9, CNN reported that Biden had a double-digit lead over Sanders in a nationwide poll. On March 12, with the coronavirus pandemic looming, Biden changed campaign managers, replacing Greg Schultz with Jen O'Malley Dillon.

=== COVID-19 and presumptive nominee ===
On March 11, 2020, the World Health Organization officially designated the outbreak of COVID-19 as a pandemic. As a result of the COVID-19 pandemic, many of the scheduled primaries were postponed. Aides to both Biden's and Sanders's campaigns were in contact regarding the pandemic and its effects.

On March 15, Jen O'Malley Dillon was announced as Biden's new campaign manager, replacing Greg Schultz.

Leading up to the 11th Democratic presidential debate, Biden announced two new progressive policies: making public colleges and universities tuition-free for students of families whose income is less than $125,000, and allowing for student loan debts to default during bankruptcy. The debate was held on March 15, 2020, and was the first to feature only the race's two lead finalists. Biden announced that if he secured the nomination, he would choose a female running mate, having previously hinted as much by naming several contenders. (Note: Previously nominated women vice-presidential candidates were Geraldine Ferraro in 1984 and Sarah Palin in 2008.) On April 3, Biden announced that his campaign would unveil a committee to vet prospective vice presidential candidates later in the month.

On March 25, when asked whether he would debate Sanders again, Biden said, "My focus is just dealing with this crisis right now. I haven't thought about any more debates. I think we've had enough debates. I think we should get on with this."

Sanders dropped out of the race on April 8, 2020 and endorsed Biden for president on April 13. When Sanders suspended his campaign, Biden became the presumptive Democratic presidential nominee. Biden is the second candidate in history to lose both the Iowa caucuses and the New Hampshire primary and still become the Democratic nominee (the first was Bill Clinton in 1992).

On April 9, 2020, a former Senate staffer told law enforcement officials that Biden had sexually assaulted her in 1993; his campaign denied the accusation. On May 1, Biden stated that the allegation was false and requested that the secretary of the Senate work with the National Archives and Records Administration to identify and release any relevant documents. The Senate denied this request, saying personnel files are "strictly confidential". Two weeks later, Biden stated that he did not remember his accuser at all.

The COVID-19 pandemic dramatically affected Biden's campaign. On April 25, 2020, The New York Times reported that Biden had "developed a routine, of sorts, as he seeks the presidency from his basement". The Times added:

With the coronavirus outbreak freezing the country’s public life, Mr. Biden has been forced to adapt to a cloistered mode of campaigning never before seen in modern American politics. He was unable to embark on a victory tour after the Democratic primaries or hold unity rallies with onetime rivals like Senators Bernie Sanders of Vermont and Elizabeth Warren of Massachusetts. Instead, the former vice president is in a distinctive kind of lockdown, walled off from voters, separated from his top strategists and yet leading in the polls.

By June 9, Biden had enough delegates to secure his nomination as the Democratic candidate.

=== Biden–Sanders Unity Task Forces ===
After Sanders withdrew from the race, Biden and Sanders formed a series of task forces. These task forces aimed to bridge the divide between the moderate wing of the Democratic party, represented by Biden, and the left wing of the party, represented by Sanders.

On May 13, Biden and Sanders announced that the six task forces would be co-chaired by Rep. Alexandria Ocasio-Cortez, former secretary of state John Kerry, Rep. Pramila Jayapal, former surgeon general Vivek Murthy, NILC director Marielena Hincapié, Rep. Lucille Roybal-Allard, AFA president Sara Nelson, Rep. Karen Bass, civil rights attorney Chiraag Bains, Rep. Bobby Scott, Dr. Heather Gautney, and Rep. Marcia Fudge.

Six task forces were formed, each with members representing each candidate, covering climate change, criminal justice reform, the economy, education, health care, and immigration. The final report was released on July 8, 2020, and was expected to form the basis of the 2020 Democratic presidential platform. The six groups were coordinated by Analilia Mejia, political director to the Sanders primary campaign, and Carmel Martin, an advisor to Biden.

(Italics denotes the chair of a committee)

==== Unity Task Force on Climate Change ====
- John Kerry
- Alexandria Ocasio-Cortez
- Kathy Castor
- Kerry Duggan
- Catherine Coleman Flowers
- Conor Lamb
- Gina McCarthy
- Donald McEachin
- Varshini Prakash

==== Unity Task Force on Criminal Justice Reform ====
- Chiraag Bains
- Bobby Scott
- Raumesh Akbari
- Justin Bamberg
- Vanita Gupta
- Eric Holder
- Symone Sanders
- Stacey Walker

==== Unity Task Force on the Economy ====
- Karen Bass
- Sara Nelson
- Jared Bernstein
- Darrick Hamilton
- Ben Harris
- Stephanie Kelton
- Lee Saunders
- Sonal Shah

==== Unity Task Force on Education ====
- Marcia Fudge
- Heather Gautney
- Alejandro Adler
- Lily Eskelsen Garcia
- Maggie Thompson
- Christie Vilsack
- Randi Weingarten
- Hirokazu Yoshikawa

==== Unity Task Force on Health Care ====
- Pramila Jayapal
- Vivek Murthy
- Donald Berwick
- Abdul El-Sayed
- Sherry Glied
- Mary Kay Henry
- Chris Jennings
- Robin Kelly

==== Unity Task Force on Immigration ====
- Lucille Roybal-Allard
- Marielena Hincapié
- Cristóbal Alex
- Veronica Escobar
- Marisa Franco
- Juan Gonzalez
- Kate Marshall
- Javier Valdés

==== Outcomes of the task forces ====
On July 8, Biden's campaign released a set of policy recommendations adopted by the Unity Task Forces appointed by him and Bernie Sanders. The recommendations focus on climate change, criminal justice, the economy, education, health care, and immigration.

=== Vice presidential announcement and Democratic convention ===
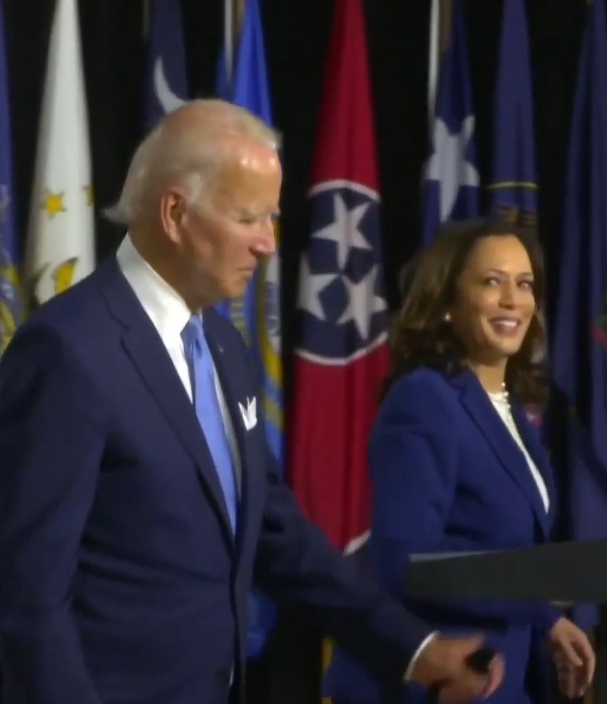
Biden and his running mate Kamala Harris at the first campaign event of the ticket, on August 12, 2020

On August 5, it was reported that Biden would accept the Democratic nomination from his home state of Delaware due to the pandemic.

On August 11, Biden announced that Kamala Harris would be his running mate. The next day, the two made their first public appearance together promoting their mutual campaigns.

On August 18, the second night of the 2020 Democratic National Convention, the party officially nominated Biden, making him the first non-incumbent vice president to be nominated for president since Walter Mondale in 1984. On August 19, Harris was nominated for vice president, making her the first Asian American and the first African American woman to be nominated for vice president on a major party ticket. Biden accepted the nomination two nights later. Chris Wallace of Fox News Sunday called Biden's acceptance speech "enormously effective" and said he "blew a big hole" in Trump's characterization of the candidate as being "mentally shot." During the convention, delegates adopted the party platform, which was drafted by a committee of many of the same people from the unity task forces and based on the recommendations issued by those task forces.

=== Presidential debates ===
Since Biden's successful nomination in the Democratic primaries Trump attempted to cast doubt over Biden's abilities, claiming that he was suffering from dementia and that he was taking performance-enhancing drugs in the primaries. Trump called for Biden to be drug tested before the presidential debate; Biden declined. Trump also claimed that Biden would use a hidden electronic earpiece for the debate, demanding that Biden's ears be searched. Again, Biden declined.

The first debate took place at Cleveland Clinic on September 29. It was moderated by Chris Wallace. Debate topics included Trump's and Biden's records, the economy, the COVID-19 pandemic, race relations, and the Supreme Court nomination of Amy Coney Barrett. Each speaker was to have two minutes to state their positions followed with a period of discussion. The debate quickly devolved into cross talk and interruptions and was widely criticized as being a low point in U.S. presidential politics. Although Wallace pleaded multiple times with Trump to follow the agreed-upon debate rules, Trump frequently interrupted and spoke over Biden and at times with Wallace as well. Following the debate Wallace stated that while his own family and the Biden family wore masks as had been required for those in attendance, the Trump family did not and refused the masks offered to them by Cleveland Clinic staffers.

The vice presidential debate between Harris and Pence took place as scheduled on October 7 with Susan Page serving as moderator. The debate was generally seen as civil although there were frequent instances of both candidates interrupting while the other was speaking, with Harris interrupting only about half as often as Pence. Pence also repeatedly spoke beyond his allotted time, ignoring Page's attempts of asking him to mind the two-minute time limits. A CNN poll of registered voters found that 59% felt Harris had won, while 38% felt Pence to be the winner.

The second debate was scheduled to take place on October 15, but was cancelled in light of the White House COVID-19 outbreak and Trump's declared intention not to participate in a virtual debate. In response to Trump's refusal to debate Biden scheduled a town hall on ABC for October 15; Trump then scheduled a town hall as well, on the same date and at the same time, to be broadcast on NBC, MSNBC, and CNBC. According to Nielsen ratings, nearly 700,000 more viewers watched Biden's town hall than those who watched Trump's, even though Trump appeared on three outlets.

The final debate took place on Thursday, October 22, 2020, from 9:00 p.m. to 10:30 p.m. EDT, at the Curb Event Center in Belmont University in Nashville, Tennessee, with Kristen Welker of NBC moderating. While it was originally planned to be the third debate, it was the second due to the cancellation of the October 15 debate. The topics covered included: fighting the current COVID-19 pandemic, American families, racial issues, climate change, national security, and leadership. The debate rules were similar to the first, but due to President Trump's repeated interruptions in the prior debate, each candidate's microphones would be muted when it was not their turn to speak. This debate was considered to be drastically less hostile and much more informative, but both candidates still made several false or misleading claims. A post-debate CNN/SSRS poll found that 53% of debate-viewers thought that Biden had won and 39% thought Trump had won, with a margin of error of 5.7 points.

=== Final month ===
On October 6, Biden made a campaign speech in Gettysburg, Pennsylvania, called "the best of his campaign" by CNN's John Avlon.

On October 15, both Biden and Trump held separate town hall speeches, replacing the cancelled second debate.

On October 22, Biden and Trump participated in a second and final debate in Nashville, Tennessee. In contrast to the first debate, the microphones of both candidates were muted at select times. Trump pressed Biden on renewed allegations that during his time as vice president, members of his family had personally profited from his position in Ukraine and China; Biden denied any misconduct and pointed out controversies involving Trump and those countries. Trump repeatedly asked why Biden had not delivered on his 2020 campaign promises during his eight years in the White House, to which Biden responded, "we had a Republican Congress."

==== Texas Trump Train incident ====
On Friday, October 30, 2020, a Biden campaign bus was reportedly surrounded and harassed by a "Trump Train" convoy of Trump supporters while traveling from San Antonio to Austin, Texas, along Interstate 35. The bus, which carried former state senator Wendy Davis and several campaign staffers, was followed along the interstate by nearly 100 vehicles, including many flying Donald Trump flags. The vehicles forced the campaign bus to slow its speed to 20 miles per hour. No one was injured, and local law enforcement helped the bus reach its destination. There was a minor collision between a vehicle driven by a Trump supporter and a vehicle driven by a Biden campaign staffer. After the incident, the Biden campaign cancelled two planned events in Austin, Texas.

The Federal Bureau of Investigation (FBI) launched an investigation into the incident. Trump subsequently criticized the FBI's decision at a rally. He later tweeted, "In my opinion, these patriots did nothing wrong. Instead, the FBI & Justice should be investigating the terrorists, anarchists, and agitators of ANTIFA, who run around burning down our Democrat run cities and hurting our people!"

In response to the Trump train incident, two lawsuits were filed—one against the occupants of the cars alleged to be involved in the incident, and one against local law enforcement. Transcripts of a 911 call regarding the incident indicated that San Marcos police refused to escort the bus and laughed and joked about the situation.

Two individual defendants made a settlement with the plaintiffs in 2023. Hannah Ceh and Kyle Kruger wrote in their settlement that they apologized for participating in the Trump Train incident. The filings state that Kruger was driving Ceh's white Toyota Tundra while Ceh sat in the passenger seat. Other terms of the settlement were not disclosed. On September 23, 2024, a jury found one of the remaining six defendants liable for $30,000 in punitive damages to be split among the three plaintiffs and $10,000 in compensatory damages to the bus driver.

The City of San Marcos settled the lawsuit against it in 2023. The city agreed to pay $175,000 to the plaintiffs and the City agreed that San Marcos police officers and professional staff will receive training on responding to political violence and voter intimidation and ways to develop community trust. The City issued a statement expressing regret for the unfortunate experience of the plaintiffs, but also said that the City continues to deny many of the allegations against it.

=== Election Day and beyond ===
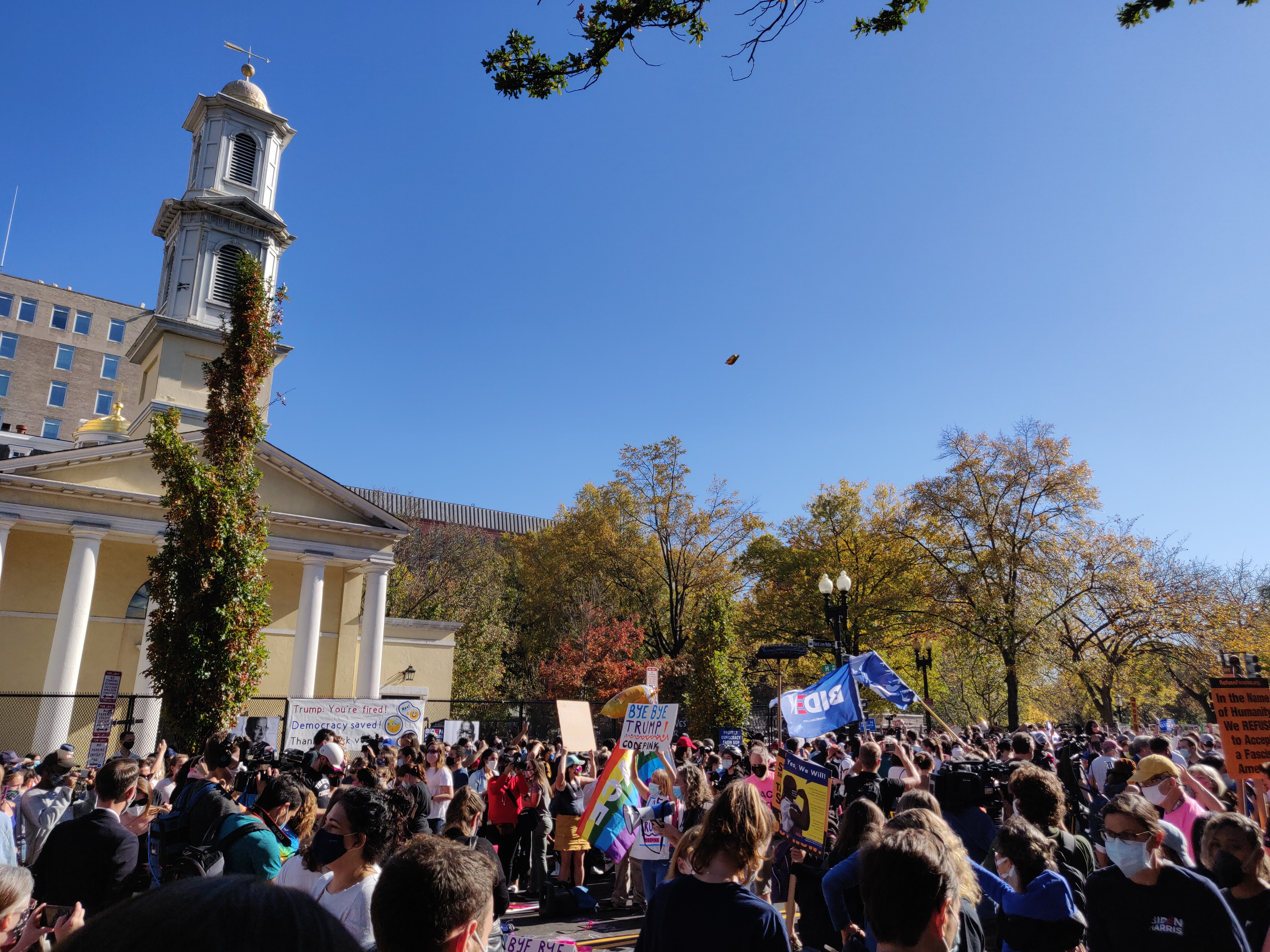
People celebrate in the streets near the White House after the major networks project Biden the winner of the 2020 U.S. presidential election.

Electoral college results of the 2020 presidential election; Biden won a majority of 306 votes

The presidential election was held on November 3, 2020. On November 6, election-calling organization Decision Desk HQ asserted that Biden had won the election based on its forecast that Biden had won Pennsylvania; this result, coupled with Biden's other projected state wins, would give him over 270 electoral college votes.

By November 7, various major news outlets forecasted that Biden had won the election.

Biden won 306 electoral college votes to Trump's 232. This was the exact margin by which Trump had won in his 2016 victory over Hillary Clinton, which Trump had repeatedly called a "landslide victory". Biden received 81,283,501 votes to Trump's 74,223,975. Biden broke the record for most votes cast during an election in the history of the United States, while Trump received the most votes ever for a sitting president. Biden became the first Democratic presidential candidate since the 1990s to win the Sun Belt states of Georgia and Arizona. (Note: Biden became the first Democratic presidential candidate to win the Sun Belt state of Georgia since Bill Clinton in 1992; Biden also became the first Democratic presidential candidate to win the Sun Belt state of Arizona since Bill Clinton in 1996.) In contrast, he was the first presidential candidate to be elected president without winning the states of Florida since 1992 and Ohio since 1960. He also became the first Democrat to win the presidential election without the state of Iowa since 1976. (Note: Republicans George H. W. Bush in 1988 and George W. Bush in 2000 won the presidency without Iowa.)

By December 9, every state had certified its election results, with West Virginia being the final state to do so. On Monday, December 14, the Electoral College voted to elect Joe Biden and Kamala Harris.

During and after the 2020 presidential election, Trump and his allies repeatedly claimed, often with little or no evidence, that there was significant electoral fraud in the 2020 election. Because of this, Trump and his lawyers called for swing state officials to overturn the results, frequently drawing criticism for their inflammatory and violent remarks. Trump's supporters filed lawsuits challenging the results in several different swing states. As of December 2020, more than 50 such lawsuits had been either withdrawn or dismissed. Notably, a major lawsuit challenging the vote in six different swing states was unanimously rejected by the conservative majority Supreme Court.

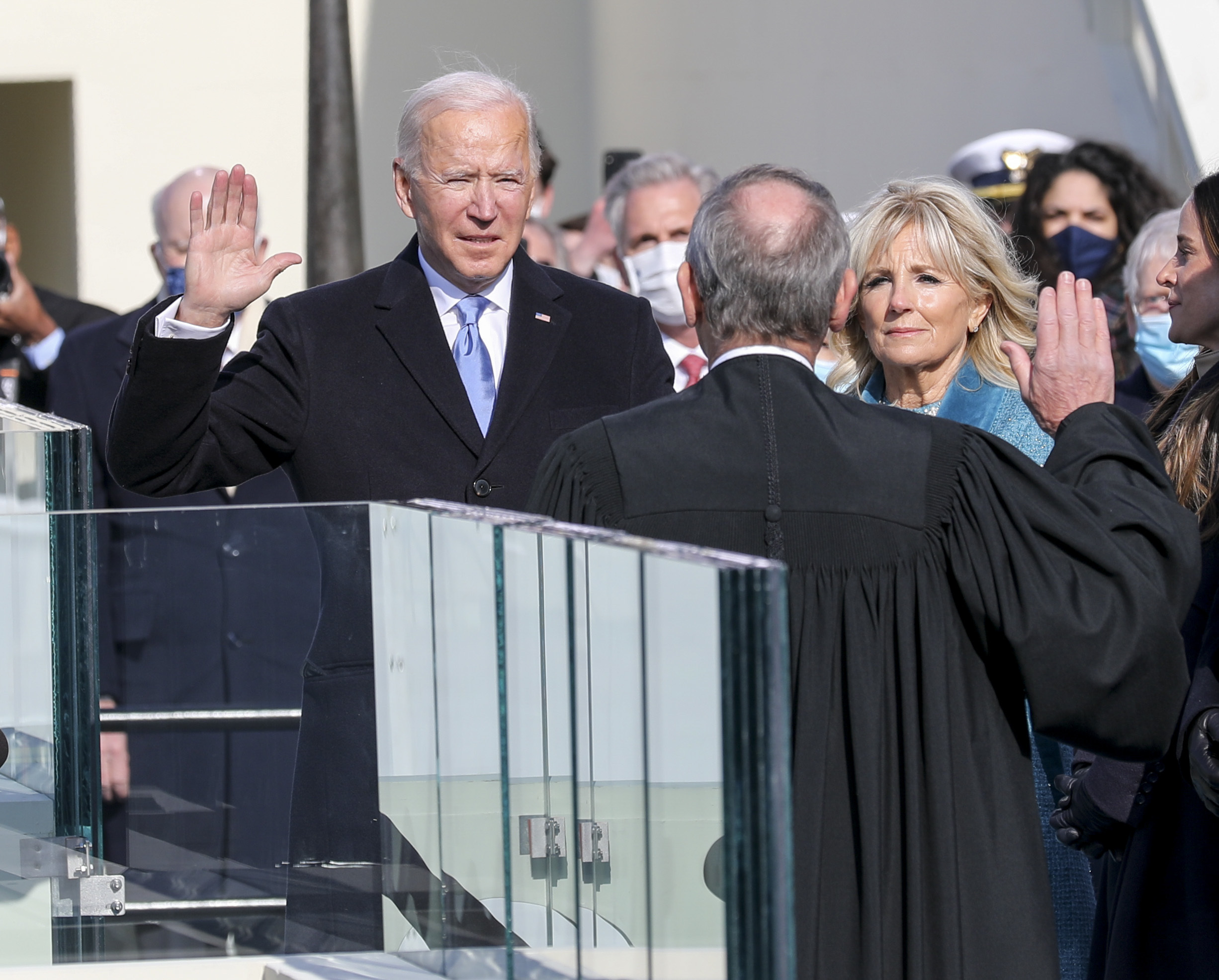
Biden being inaugurated on January 20, 2021 as the 46th president of the United States

On January 6, 2021, a violent group of Trump supporters broke into the United States Capitol while Congress was counting the electoral votes in an attempt to halt or slow the proceedings. The rioters were not successful in stopping the count, though they did manage to delay the certification by a few hours.

Despite the attacks, lawmakers successfully met and began counting the electoral votes submitted by the states on January 6. In a last-ditch attempt at overturning the election, several Republican members of the House and Senate objected to the January 6 certification of the Electoral College, but after a long night of deliberation, Mike Pence certified the results for Biden, ensuring that Biden would take office as the 46th president at noon on January 20.

== Polling ==
Opinion polls conducted in 2020 generally showed Biden leading Trump nationally in general election matchups, with the former vice president's advantage often extending beyond that of the survey's margin of sampling error.

On July 4, Politico reported that Biden was leading Trump "by double digits in recent polls". In late July, a Washington Post–ABC News poll showed Biden's double-digit lead holding. A national poll conducted in early August showed Biden leading by three percent. An Iowa poll showed Trump leading Biden by 48% to 45%, which is six percentage points less than Trump won the state with in 2016.

Three national polls released August 13–17 show Biden polling ahead of Trump: Fox News had him leading Trump 49%–42%, NBC/Wall Street Journal had him leading 50%–41%, and Washington Post/ABC News has him 53%–41%. A Pew Research Center showed similar results, but found that a majority of participants believed that Trump would win. A Washington Post/ABC News poll taken in late September showed Biden and Harris's lead to be 53%–43%.

An NBC News/Wall Street Journal poll conducted September 30 – October 1 (after the presidential debate, but before Trump's announcement of his COVID-19 diagnosis) has Biden leading 53%–39%. On October 7, a CNN poll showed Biden leading 57%–41%, and a week later, Opinium Research/The Guardian showed him leading 57%–40%. As of October 13, Biden consistently led in poll averages by several or more points for over 100 days, as compared to the last four presidential elections. Biden led 54%–42% in a CNN poll of October 28; its polling director pointed out that:

Although the election will ultimately be decided by the statewide results, which drive the Electoral College, Biden's lead nationally is wider than any presidential candidate has held in more than two decades in the final days of the campaign.

=== Odds of winning ===
In late September, FiveThirtyEight put Biden's odds of winning at nearly 77% and specifically predicted that he would win 352 electoral votes. His popularity rose in early October and, by October 13, FiveThirtyEight had increased its odds of Biden winning the election to 87%. This calculation remained the same through October 26, when it began to rise again, reaching 90% on October 30.

== Questions about inappropriate physical contact ==
Biden has been accused several times of inappropriate non-sexual contact, such as embracing, kissing, and other forms of physical contact. He has described himself as a "tactile politician" and admitted this behavior has caused trouble for him in the past. By 2015, a series of swearings-in and other events at which Biden had placed his hands on people and talked closely to them, attracted attention both in the press and on social media. Various people defended Biden, including a senator who issued a statement, as well as Stephanie Carter, a woman whose photograph with Biden had gone viral, who described the photo as "misleadingly extracted from what was a longer moment between close friends".

In March 2019, former Nevada assemblywoman Lucy Flores alleged that Biden had touched her without her consent at a 2014 campaign rally in Las Vegas. In an op-ed, Flores wrote that Biden had walked up behind her, put his hands on her shoulders, smelled her hair, and kissed the back of her head, adding that the way he touched her was "an intimate way reserved for close friends, family, or romantic partners—and I felt powerless to do anything about it." Biden's spokesman said Biden did not recall the behavior described. Two days later, Amy Lappos, a former congressional aide to Jim Himes, said Biden touched her in a non-sexual but inappropriate way by holding her head to rub noses with her at a political fundraiser in Greenwich in 2009. The next day, two more women came forward with allegations of unwanted touching claiming that he touched a woman's leg during a meeting, and that he placed his hand on a woman's back during a photo.

In early April 2019, three women told The Washington Post Biden had touched them in ways that made them feel uncomfortable. Also in April 2019, former Biden staffer Tara Reade said she had felt uncomfortable on several occasions when Biden touched her on her shoulder and neck during her employment in his Senate office in 1993. In March 2020, Reade accused him of a 1993 sexual assault. There were inconsistencies between Reade's 2019 and 2020 allegations. Biden and his campaign vehemently denied the allegation. The New York Times investigated and "found no pattern of sexual misconduct by Mr. Biden".

Biden apologized for not understanding how people would react to his actions, but said his intentions were honorable and that he would be more "mindful of people's personal space". He went on to say he was not sorry for anything he had ever done, which led critics to accuse him of sending a mixed message. Arwa Mahdawi of The Guardian said it was "frustrating to see conservatives... weaponize the accusations against Biden", but that it was "also frustrating to see so many liberals turn a blind eye".

== Endorsements ==
As tracked by FiveThirtyEight, Biden received the most support from prominent members of the Democratic Party out of all Democratic candidates in the 2020 presidential election after many settled for Biden, Sanders' popularity was dropping in the polls, and many wanted Joe Biden rather than Bernie Sanders. Biden received endorsements from 12 former candidates in the 2020 race, including Bernie Sanders, Pete Buttigieg, Michael Bloomberg, Tulsi Gabbard, Amy Klobuchar, Kamala Harris, Cory Booker, Beto O'Rourke, Andrew Yang, and others. On April 14, 2020, after Biden was the only remaining major candidate for the Democratic nomination, former president Barack Obama (under whom Biden served as vice president) endorsed him. On April 27, Speaker of the House Nancy Pelosi endorsed him. On April 28, Biden received the endorsement of former 2016 Democratic presidential nominee Hillary Clinton, whose election loss had inspired his 2020 candidacy.

Biden increasingly attracted Republican support away from their party's incumbent leader, Donald Trump. On August 17, an ad from Republican Voters Against Trump aired featuring Miles Taylor, former chief of staff to former homeland security secretary Kirstjen Nielsen. Taylor concludes in the ad, "Given what I experienced in the [Trump] administration, I have to support Joe Biden for president." In late August, a movement called Republicans for Biden was launched with sponsorship by 25 former Republican congresspeople, and Politico reported that "Several dozen former staffers from Sen. Mitt Romney's (R-Utah) presidential campaign, the George W. Bush administration and the campaign and Senate staff of former senator John McCain (R-Ariz.) have signed on to an effort to elect Joe Biden." By early September, over 175 current and former law enforcement officials had endorsed Biden.

In September 2020, Scientific American announced its endorsement of Biden for president. This was the first time the magazine had endorsed a presidential candidate in the almost 200 years that it has been in print. The magazine's endorsement read:

The evidence and the science show that Donald Trump has badly damaged the U.S. and its people—because he rejects evidence and science. The most devastating example is his dishonest and inept response to the COVID-19 pandemic, which cost more than 190,000 Americans their lives by the middle of September. He has also attacked environmental protections, medical care, and the researchers and public science agencies that help this country prepare for its greatest challenges. That is why we urge you to vote for Joe Biden, who is offering fact-based plans to protect our health, our economy and the environment. These and other proposals he has put forth can set the country back on course for a safer, more prosperous and more equitable future.

In October, the New England Journal of Medicine, the oldest and considered to be the world's most prestigious medical journal, published an editorial which condemned the Trump administration's handling of the coronavirus pandemic saying that "they have taken a crisis and turned it into a tragedy." This is the first time in the journal's history that they have supported or condemned a political candidate. A week later, the science journal Nature also endorsed Biden.

In October, 780 retired generals, admirals, senior noncommissioned officers, ambassadors and senior national security officials signed a letter endorsing Biden.

On October 25, the conservative-leaning New Hampshire Union Leader endorsed Biden, the first Democratic presidential candidate the paper had endorsed in over 100 years.

== Political positions ==
Although generally referred to as a moderate, Biden has declared himself as the candidate with the most progressive record.

=== Abortion ===
On May 21, 2019, a Biden campaign aide told the Associated Press that Biden would support immediate federal legislation codifying Roe v. Wade into statute. On June 5, 2019, the Biden campaign confirmed to NBC News that Biden still supports the Hyde Amendment, something no other Democratic presidential candidate came out in support of. Biden's campaign also told NBC News that Biden would be open to repealing the Hyde Amendment if abortion access protections currently under Roe v. Wade were threatened. On June 6, 2019, Biden, at the Democratic National Committee's African American Leadership Council Summit in Atlanta, Georgia, said he now supports repealing the Hyde Amendment, crediting his change in position, in part, to recent efforts by Republicans passing anti-abortion state laws, which he called "extreme laws". Also at the summit, he focused on economic inequality for African Americans, education access, criminal justice reform, healthcare, and voter suppression in the south.

=== Cannabis ===
Biden supports the decriminalization, but not legalization, of recreational cannabis usage. Biden said he believes no one should be in jail because of cannabis use. As president, he would decriminalize cannabis use and automatically expunge prior convictions. He supports the legalization of cannabis for medical purposes, leaving decisions regarding legalization for recreational use up to the states, and recategorizing cannabis as a Schedule II drug so researchers can study its impacts. Every other Democratic presidential candidate supported the full federal legalization of cannabis, with the exception of Michael Bloomberg, Steve Bullock and Joe Sestak.

=== Capital punishment ===
On June 20, 2019, following the first federal death sentence since 2003, Biden came out against capital punishment, supporting the repeal of both federal- and state-level death sentence statutes. He argued that with the death penalty, there is a risk of executing a wrongfully convicted person. Biden had previously supported capital punishment.

=== Education ===
In 2018, Biden said he supported a universal pre-kindergarten program. He unveiled a higher education plan in October 2019, which includes two years of guaranteed free community college or other training, and cuts to student loan obligations. Unlike some of his rivals, he initially did not support four years of free college tuition, but later reversed this for students of families whose income is less than $125,000, as well as allowing student loan debts to default during bankruptcy.

Although the Obama administration promoted charter schools, Biden criticized some charter schools for funneling money away from public schools in a May 2019 speech, and said that he opposes federal funds for-profit charter schools.

=== Environment ===
On June 4, 2019, the Biden campaign released a $1.7 trillion climate plan that embraced the framework of the Green New Deal. The plan called for the US to reach net zero emissions by 2050 or earlier, and help coal workers to transition into jobs created from a clean-energy economy. Biden supports the development of carbon capture and storage and small modular reactors to reduce emissions. On September 4, 2019, during a CNN climate change town hall, Biden said he does not support banning fracking for natural gas, distancing himself from some of his Democratic presidential rivals, but said he would ban new fracking permits and evaluate existing ones to determine their safety.

=== Health ===
On July 16, 2019, Biden called for additional funding to construct rural hospitals, increase telehealth services in rural communities, and provide incentives for doctors to practice in rural areas, also known as medical deserts in the United States.

On April 29, 2019, Biden came out in favor of a public option for health insurance and outlawing non-compete clauses for low-wage workers.

=== Immigration ===
On July 5, 2019, Biden told CNN he did not support decriminalizing illegal entry into the United States, a position that puts him at odds with many of his 2020 Democratic rivals. He released a plan to reform the immigration system in December 2019, which includes a reversal of the Trump administration's deportation policies, a pathway to citizenship for undocumented immigrants, and expansions in work visas and refugee admissions.

=== Infrastructure ===
Biden released his infrastructure plan on November 14, 2019, calling for investments of $1.3 trillion on infrastructure overhaul. The plan involves investments in the restoration of roads, bridges and highways, encouraging greater adoption of rail transport and electric vehicles. It also includes water pipe replacements, increases in broadband coverage, and updates to schools.

=== LGBTQ issues ===
On June 1, 2019, Biden gave a keynote address to hundreds of activists and donors at the Human Rights Campaign's annual Ohio gala. He declared his top legislative priority was passing the Equality Act. He attacked Donald Trump for banning transgender troops in the U.S. military, allowing individuals in the medical field to deny treating LGBTQ individuals, and allowing homeless shelters to deny transgender occupants. On May 6, 2020, the Human Rights Campaign endorsed Biden.

=== Race relations ===
While at a fundraiser on June 18, 2019, Biden said one of his greatest strengths was "bringing people together" and pointed to his relationships with senators James Eastland and Herman Talmadge, two segregationists, as examples. While imitating a Southern drawl, Biden remarked "I was in a caucus with James O. Eastland. He never called me 'boy', he always called me 'son'." Biden's Democratic opponents criticized the remarks, specifically the use of the word "boy". In response, Biden said that he was not meaning to use the term "boy" in its derogatory racial context.

During the first Democratic presidential debate, Kamala Harris criticized Biden for his comments regarding his past work with segregationist senators and his past opposition to desegregation busing, which had allowed black children like her to attend integrated schools. Biden was widely criticized for his debate performance and support for him dropped 10 points. President Trump defended Biden, saying Harris was given "too much credit" for her debate with Biden.

In May 2020, during an interview on The Breakfast Club radio show that CBS News described as "contentious", Biden remarked "If you have a problem figuring out whether you're for me or Trump, then you ain't black." He later apologized for his remarks.

=== Welfare ===
On June 17, 2019, Biden appeared at the "Poor People's Campaign Presidential Forum" in Washington, D.C., to discuss proposals for the funding of poverty alleviation programs. At a fundraiser at the Carlyle Hotel in New York the next day, while on the topic of raising wealthy donors' taxes to get his legislative goals passed, he warned wealthy donors that extraordinary income inequality would foment political extremism and revolution, while changes to national tax policy, and large tax hikes to finance social services and welfare programs, would not fundamentally affect their standard of living:

I could take about $400 [billion] away, and it wouldn’t change your standard of living one tiny little bit — not even an iota.

== Trump–Ukraine scandal ==
In 2019, Trump allegedly attempted to coerce Ukraine and other foreign countries to investigate Joe Biden's son Hunter. Trump enlisted surrogates within and outside his official administration, including his personal lawyer Rudy Giuliani and Attorney General William Barr, to pressure Ukraine and other foreign governments to cooperate in supporting conspiracy theories concerning American politics. Trump blocked but later released payment of a congressionally mandated $391 million military aid package to allegedly obtain quid pro quo cooperation from Volodymyr Zelenskyy, the President of Ukraine. A number of contacts were established between the White House and the government of Ukraine, culminating in a phone call between Trump and Zelenskyy on July 25, 2019.

The scandal resulted in Trump's impeachment on charges of abusing the power of his office and obstructing Congress, and his ultimate acquittal by the Senate. At the time, no evidence had been produced of any wrongdoing by the Bidens.

In October 2019, CNN refused to run an ad for the Donald Trump 2020 presidential campaign, saying it includes false claims against Biden. Fox News refused to stop airing a Trump campaign ad that allegedly lied about Biden after his campaign asked them to stop running the ad.

=== Hunter Biden laptop ===
On October 14, 2020, the New York Post, a conservative daily tabloid newspaper owned by Rupert Murdoch's News Corp, ran a story showing a screenshot of an alleged email from a top adviser to Ukrainian energy company Burisma to Biden's son Hunter, thanking him for the supposed opportunity to meet his father. The article alleges that this supports claims that Biden used his political power to benefit his son Hunter in business dealings with Ukraine. The Post's source was Trump's personal lawyer Rudy Giuliani, who says he got the data from the hard drive of a laptop allegedly dropped off at a repair shop in April 2019. The shop owner, John Mac Isaac, said he initially turned the laptop over to the FBI and later shared a copy of the data with Giuliani. CBS reported that they held a lengthy interview with Mac Isaac in which he frequently contradicted himself, "raising questions about [his] truthfulness." Social media platforms swiftly responded by controlling how the article could be shared—Facebook by including a fact-checking statement and Twitter by preventing links to the story on the basis of its containing hacked material. Republican politicians accused these platforms of censorship, renewing calls for reform of Section 230. Trump suggested that disclosures in the emails should disqualify Biden from the presidency. Biden's campaign and those associated with him portrayed the article's allegations as false, saying that no such meeting ever happened. Former U.S. intelligence officials warned the White House in 2019 that Giuliani could be the target of a Russian intelligence operation.

A June 2021 PolitiFact fact-check stated that "over time, there has been less doubt that the laptop did in fact belong to Hunter Biden", although concluded that "[n]othing from the laptop has revealed illegal or unethical behavior by Joe Biden as vice president with regard to his son's tenure as a director for Burisma". In an opinion article, Holman W. Jenkins Jr. of The Wall Street Journal criticized other journalists regarding the laptop, for "ignoring a story you know to be true in hopes your readers will believe it's not true". Glenn Kessler of The Washington Post analyzed a claim, purportedly from emails of the laptop, that Joe Biden met with Burisma executive Vadym Pozharskyi at a dinner in April 2015. Kessler concluded that Joe Biden had briefly dropped by the dinner to speak to his longtime Greek friend, Alexander Karloutsos, without participating in the dinner; additionally, while the attendees list included the name "Vadym", no last name was specified.

== See also ==
- Joe Biden 2024 presidential campaign
- Donald Trump 2020 presidential campaign
