= 2020 North Carolina Democratic presidential primary =

- March 3, 2020

122 delegates (110 pledged, 12 unpledged) to the Democratic National Convention The number of pledged delegates won is determined by the popular vote

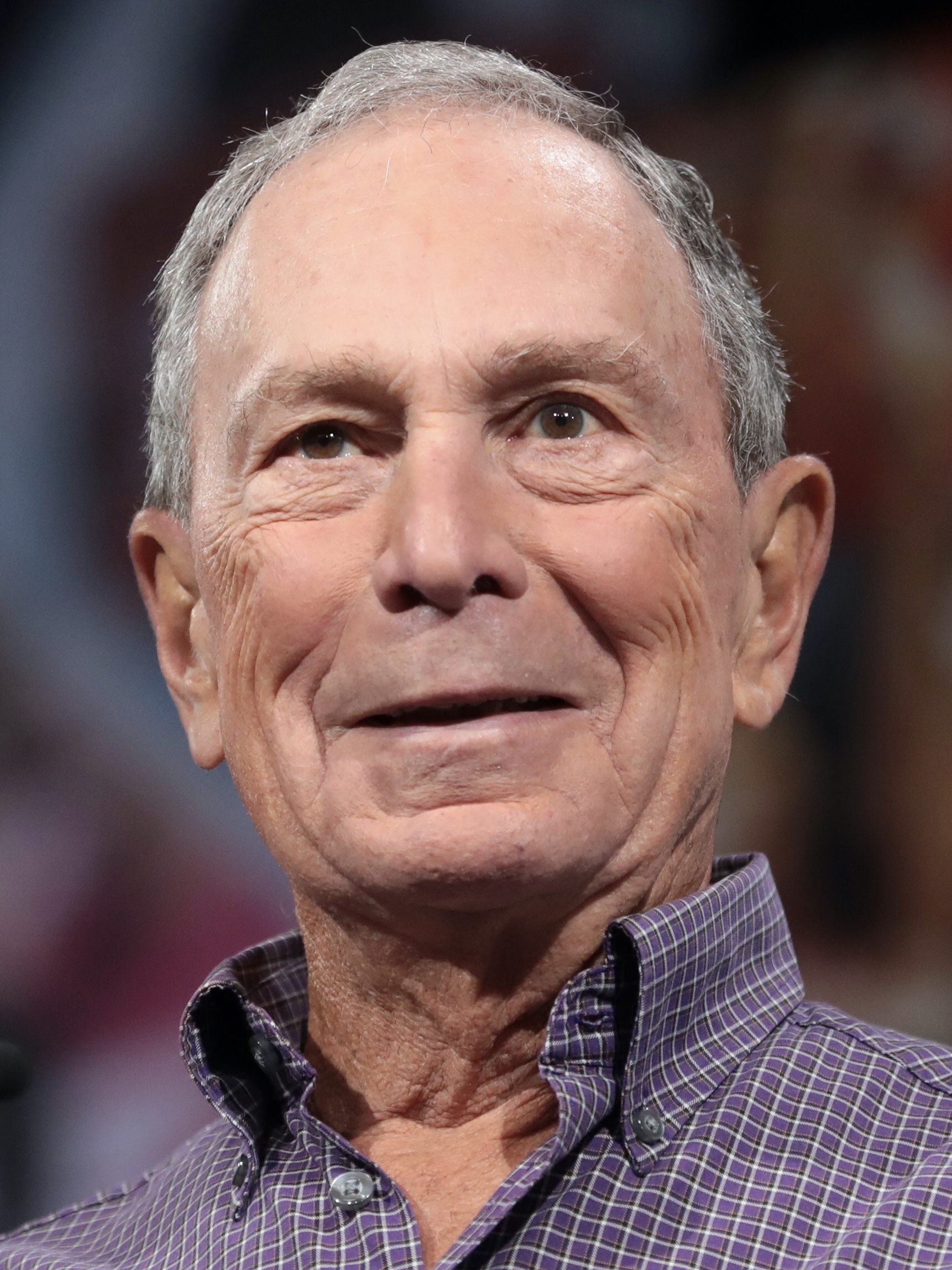

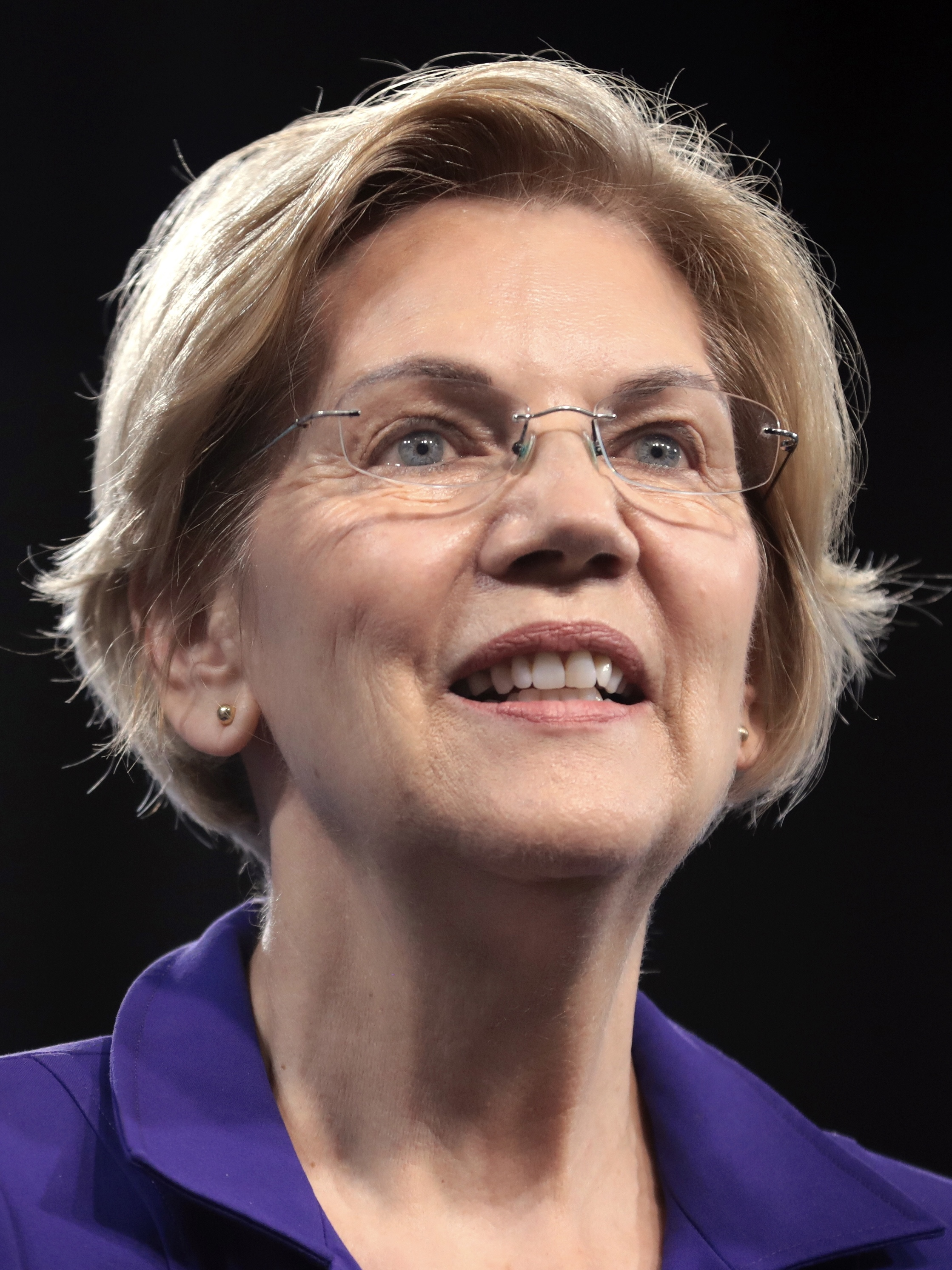
Candidate	Joe Biden	Bernie Sanders
Home state	Delaware	Vermont
Delegate count	68	37
Popular vote	572,271	322,645
Percentage	42.95%	24.22%
Candidate	Michael Bloomberg	Elizabeth Warren
Home state	New York	Massachusetts
Delegate count	3	2
Popular vote	172,558	139,912
Percentage	12.95%	10.50%
Biden
<30%
30 – 40%
40 – 50%
50 – 60%
60 – 70%
Sanders
30 – 40%
40 – 50%
Biden <30% 30–40% 40–50% 50–60% 60–70% 70–80% 80–90%	Sanders <30% 30–40% 40–50% 50–60% 60–70%	Bloomberg 30–40% 40–50% 60–70%
Warren
<30%
30–40%
Tie
20–30%
30–40%
40–50%
50%
Other

The 2020 North Carolina Democratic presidential primary took place on March 3, 2020, as one of 15 contests scheduled on Super Tuesday in the Democratic Party primaries for the 2020 presidential election, following the South Carolina primary the weekend before. The North Carolina primary was a semi-closed primary, with the state awarding 122 delegates towards the 2020 Democratic National Convention, of which 110 were pledged delegates allocated on the basis of the results of the primary.

Former vice president Joe Biden won the state with 43% of the vote, gaining 68 delegates, far ahead of senator Bernie Sanders, who attained around 24% and 37 delegates. Biden won southern white voters and Latino voters and also scored overwhelming support from the African American community in the South. Former mayor Michael Bloomberg and senator Elizabeth Warren were below 15% and only won a few district delegates each.

== Procedure ==
North Carolina was one of 14 states and one territory holding primaries on March 3, 2020, also known as "Super Tuesday", with governor Roy Cooper having signed a bill on June 22, 2018, which pushed the date of the primary a few weeks back to the first Tuesday in March and ordered simultaneous state, local, and presidential primaries.

Voting took place throughout the state from 6:30 a.m. until 7:30 p.m. In the semi-closed primary, candidates had to meet a threshold of 15 percent at the congressional district or statewide level in order to be considered viable. The 110 pledged delegates to the 2020 Democratic National Convention were to be allocated proportionally on the basis of the results of the primary. Of these, between 3 and 9 were allocated to each of the state's 13 congressional districts and another 14 were allocated to party leaders and elected officials (PLEO delegates), in addition to 24 at-large delegates. The Super Tuesday primary as part of Stage I on the primary timetable received no bonus delegates, in order to disperse the primaries between more different date clusters and keep too many states from hoarding on the first shared date or on a March date in general.

After county conventions on March 28, 2020, which selected delegates to the congressional district and state conventions, the congressional district conventions were held on May 16, 2020 (postponed from the original date of April 25 due to the COVID-19 pandemic) and selected national convention delegates. The state convention was subsequently held on June 6, 2020, in Raleigh to vote on the 24 at-large and 14 pledged PLEO delegates for the Democratic National Convention. The delegation also included 12 unpledged PLEO delegates: 8 members of the Democratic National Committee, 3 representatives from Congress, and the governor Roy Cooper.

Pledged national convention delegates
Type	Del.	Type	Del.
CD1	6	CD8	5
CD2	8	CD9	5
CD3	4	CD10	4
CD4	9	CD11	5
CD5	3	CD12	8
CD6	7	CD13	3
CD7	5	CD13	3
PLEO	14	At-large	24
Total pledged delegates			110

== Candidates ==
The following candidates filed and were on the ballot in North Carolina:

Running

- Joe Biden
- Michael Bloomberg
- Tulsi Gabbard
- Bernie Sanders
- Elizabeth Warren

Withdrawn

- Michael Bennet
- Cory Booker
- Pete Buttigieg (Note: Candidate withdrew during early voting, shortly before the date of the election.)
- Julian Castro
- John Delaney
- Amy Klobuchar
- Deval Patrick
- Tom Steyer
- Marianne Williamson
- Andrew Yang

There was also a "no preference" option on the ballot.

== Polling ==
Polling Aggregation
Source of poll aggregation	Date Updated	Dates polled	Joe Biden	Bernie Sanders	Michael Bloomberg	Elizabeth Warren	Tulsi Gabbard	Other/ Undecided (Note: Calculated by taking the difference of 100% and all other candidates combined)
270 to Win	March 3, 2020	February 21–March 2, 2020	27.8%	25.8%	17.0%	11.6%	0.8%	17.0%
RealClear Politics	March 3, 2020	February 27–March 2, 2020	36.7%	23.3%	14.3%	10.7%	1.0%	14.0%
FiveThirtyEight	March 3, 2020	until March 2, 2020 (Note: FiveThirtyEight aggregates polls with a trendline regression of polls rather than a strict average of recent polls.)	34.5%	22.1%	14.4%	11.3%	0.2%	17.5%
Average			33.0%	23.7%	15.2%	11.2%	0.7%	16.2%
North Carolina primary results (March 3, 2020)			43.0%	24.1%	13.0%	10.5%	0.5%	8.9%

Tabulation of individual polls of the 2020 North Carolina Democratic primary
Poll source	Date(s) administered	Sample size (Note: Key: A – all adults RV – registered voters LV – likely voters V – unclear)	Margin of error	Joe Biden	Michael Bloomberg	Cory Booker	Pete Buttigieg	Kamala Harris	Bernie Sanders	Elizabeth Warren	Andrew Yang	Other	Undecided
	Mar 2, 2020	Klobuchar withdraws from the race											
Spry Strategies/Civitas	Mar 1–2, 2020	543 (LV)	± 4.2%	45%	11%	–	3%	–	18%	7%	–	6% (Note: Klobuchar with 3%; "Another Candidate" with 3%)	11%
Swayable	Mar 1–2, 2020	1,209 (LV)	± 3.0%	36%	18%	–	4%	–	23%	10%	–	10% (Note: Klobuchar with 4%; Steyer with 1%; Gabbard with 0%; "Other" with 5%)	–
Data for Progress	Feb 28–Mar 2, 2020	334 (LV)	± 5.3%	36%	18%	–	3%	–	27%	14%	–	3% (Note: Klobuchar with 2%; Gabbard with 1%)	–
	Mar 1, 2020	Buttigieg withdraws from the race											
Elucd	Feb 26–Mar 1, 2020	657 (LV)	± 3.8%	25%	15%	–	6%	–	26%	12%	–	6% (Note: Klobuchar with 6%)	10%
East Carolina University	Feb 27–28, 2020	499 (LV)	± 5.1%	29%	14%	–	4%	–	25%	11%	–	9% (Note: Klobuchar with 5%; Steyer with 3%; Gabbard with 1%)	9%
High Point University	Feb 21–28, 2020	274 (LV)	–	14%	20%	–	8%	–	28%	12%	–	13% (Note: Klobuchar and Steyer with 4%; Booker and Patrick with 2%; Gabbard with 1%; Bennet, Castro, Delaney, Williamson, and Yang with 0%)	7%
High Point University	Feb 21–28, 2020	472 (RV)	–	14%	18%	–	8%	–	31%	11%	–	11% (Note: Steyer with 4%; Klobuchar with 3%; Booker with 2%; Gabbard and Patrick with 1%; Bennet, Castro, Delaney, Williamson, and Yang with 0%)	7%
Spry Strategies/Civitas	Feb 26–27, 2020	581 (LV)	± 4.1%	27%	16%	–	4%	–	19%	11%	–	10% (Note: Klobuchar with 5%; "Another Candidate" with 5%)	15%
Marist College	Feb 23–27, 2020	568 (LV)	± 5.1%	24%	15%	–	7%	–	26%	11%	–	8% (Note: Klobuchar with 5%; Steyer with 2%; Gabbard with 1%; "Other" with <1%)	7%
Marist College	Feb 23–27, 2020	974 (RV)	± 3.9%	22%	15%	–	7%	–	27%	11%	–	9% (Note: Klobuchar with 5%; Steyer with 2%; Gabbard with 1%; "Other" with 1%)	8%
Data for Progress	Feb 23–27, 2020	536 (LV)	± 4.2%	25%	18%	–	10%	–	27%	11%	–	8% (Note: Klobuchar with 6%; Gabbard and Steyer with 1%)	–
Public Policy Polling	Feb 23–24, 2020	852 (LV)	± 3.4%	23%	17%	–	9%	–	20%	11%	–	8% (Note: Klobuchar with 4%; Steyer with 3%; Gabbard with 1%)	11% (Note: Support listed for "someone else/undecided")
Meredith College	Feb 16–24, 2020	430 (LV)	–	17.9%	17.0%	0.7%	10.0%	–	19.5%	10.9%	–	7.6% (Note: Klobuchar with 4.0%; Gabbard with 0.9%; Yang with 0.7%; Steyer, Bennet, Patrick, and Williamson with 0.5%; Castro and Delaney with 0.0%)	16.5% (Note: "No preference" with 3.7%; "Don't know" with 11.2%; "No answer/Refused" with 1.6%)
Spry Strategies/Civitas	Feb 21–23, 2020	561 (LV)	± 3.75%	20%	20%	–	3%	–	20%	9%	–	13% (Note: Klobuchar with 6%; "Another Candidate" with 7%)	14%
University of Massachusetts Lowell	Feb 12–18, 2020	450 (LV)	± 6.5%	16%	19%	–	10%	–	23%	13%	–	13% (Note: Klobuchar with 7%; Gabbard and Steyer with 3%)	6%
SurveyUSA/WRAL News	Feb 13–16, 2020	698 (LV)	± 5.0%	20%	22%	–	11%	–	22%	8%	–	7% (Note: Klobuchar with 5%; others with 2%)	11%
	Feb 11, 2020	New Hampshire primary; Yang withdraws from the race after close of polls											
High Point University	Jan 31–Feb 6, 2020	225 (LV)	–	24%	16%	0%	8%	–	20%	11%	3%	9% (Note: Steyer with 4%; Klobuchar with 3%; Gabbard with 2%; Castro, Delaney and Patrick with 0%)	8%
High Point University	Jan 31–Feb 6, 2020	399 (RV)	–	19%	13%	1%	6%	–	25%	12%	4%	8% (Note: Steyer and Klobuchar with 3%; Gabbard and Patrick with 1%; Castro and Delaney with 0%)	12%
Public Policy Polling	Feb 4–5, 2020	604 (LV)	–	25%	14%	–	9%	–	16%	12%	5%	7% (Note: Klobuchar with 5% and Steyer with 2%)	13% (Note: Support listed for "someone else/undecided")
	Jan 13, 2020	Booker withdraws from the race											
Public Policy Polling	Jan 10–12, 2020	509 (LV)	–	31%	8%	1%	6%	–	18%	15%	5%	6% (Note: Klobuchar and Steyer with 3%)	11% (Note: Support listed for "someone else/undecided")
	Dec 3, 2019	Harris withdraws from the race											
	Nov 24, 2019	Bloomberg launches his campaign											
Fox News	Nov 10–13, 2019	669	± 3.5%	37%	–	2%	6%	4%	14%	15%	2%	8% (Note: Gabbard and Steyer with 2%; Bennet, Bullock and Klobuchar with 1%; Castro, Delaney, Messam, Sestak and Williamson with 0%; others with 1%; none with 3%)	10%
HighPoint University	Nov 1–7, 2019	347 (Note: Democrats only)	± 6.4%	33%	–	2%	4%	5%	18%	13%	2%	6% (Note: Klobuchar with 3%; Steyer with 2%; Gabbard with 1%; refused with 6%)	10%
HighPoint University	Nov 1–7, 2019	1,049 (Note: All adults)	± 3.6%	18%	–	2%	4%	4%	15%	7%	2%	7% (Note: Gabbard with 4%; Klobuchar with 2%; Steyer with 1%; refused with 21%)	23%
Siena Research/New York Times	Oct 13–26, 2019	324	–	29%	–	1%	1%	1%	13%	15%	0%	3% (Note: O'Rourke with 2%; Gabbard with 1%; others with 0%)	32%
High Point University	Sep 13–19, 2019	348 (A)	–	31%	–	4%	3%	6%	20%	15%	4%	3% (Note: Castro, Klobuchar, and O'Rourke with 1%)	9%
SurveyUSA/Civitas	Aug 1–5, 2019	534	± 6.1%	36%	–	1%	5%	8%	15%	13%	1%	2% (Note: Castro, and Gabbard with 1%; O'Rourke with 0%)	17%
Emerson College	May 31 – Jun 3, 2019	397	± 4.9%	39%	–	1%	8%	5%	22%	15%	1%	7% (Note: O'Rourke with 3%; de Blasio, Gillibrand, Klobuchar, and Ryan with 1%; Bennet, Bullock, Castro, Delaney, Gabbard, Gravel, Hickenlooper, Inslee, Messam, Moulton, Swalwell, and Williamson with 0%; others with 2%)	–

== Results ==
Popular vote share by county Biden—<30% Biden—30–40% Biden—40–50% Biden—50–60% Biden—60–70% Sanders—30–40% Sanders—40–50%

2020 North Carolina Democratic presidential primary
Candidate	Votes	%	Delegates
Joe Biden	572,271	42.95	68
Bernie Sanders	322,645	24.22	37
Michael Bloomberg	172,558	12.95	3
Elizabeth Warren	139,912	10.50	2
Pete Buttigieg (withdrawn)	43,632	3.27	
Amy Klobuchar (withdrawn)	30,742	2.31	
Tom Steyer (withdrawn)	10,679	0.80	
Tulsi Gabbard	6,622	0.50	
Andrew Yang (withdrawn)	2,973	0.22	
Cory Booker (withdrawn)	2,181	0.16	
Michael Bennet (withdrawn)	1,978	0.15	
Deval Patrick (withdrawn)	1,341	0.10	
Marianne Williamson (withdrawn)	1,243	0.09	
John Delaney (withdrawn)	1,098	0.08	
Julian Castro (withdrawn)	699	0.05	
No Preference	21,808	1.64	
Total	1,332,382	100%	110

=== Results by county ===
2020 North Carolina Democratic primary (results per county)
County	Joe Biden		Bernie Sanders		Michael Bloomberg		Elizabeth Warren		Pete Buttigieg		Amy Klobuchar		Tom Steyer		Tulsi Gabbard		Andrew Yang		Cory Booker		Michael Bennet		Deval Patrick		Marianne Williamson		John Delaney		Julian Castro		No Preference		Total votes cast
County	Votes	%	Votes	%	Votes	%	Votes	%	Votes	%	Votes	%	Votes	%	Votes	%	Votes	%	Votes	%	Votes	%	Votes	%	Votes	%	Votes	%	Votes	%	Votes	%	Total votes cast
Alamance	7,702	43.61	4,383	24.82	2,307	13.06	1,646	9.32	600	3.40	386	2.19	112	0.63	85	0.48	42	0.24	29	0.16	27	0.15	17	0.10	17	0.10	24	0.14	23	0.13	261	1.48	17,661
Alexander	933	40.44	435	18.86	430	18.64	137	5.94	87	3.77	81	3.51	50	2.17	20	0.87	16	0.69	8	0.35	3	0.13	6	0.26	3	0.13	5	0.22	3	0.13	90	3.90	2,307
Alleghany	366	33.83	210	19.41	244	22.55	54	4.99	56	5.18	62	5.73	13	1.20	10	0.92	2	0.18	1	0.09	0	0	3	0.28	2	0.18	3	0.28	3	0.28	53	4.90	1,082
Anson	2,077	62.28	431	12.92	365	10.94	88	2.64	32	0.96	54	1.62	37	1.11	12	0.36	9	0.27	11	0.33	23	0.69	9	0.27	5	0.15	4	0.12	1	0.03	177	5.31	3,335
Ashe	969	40.27	536	22.28	379	15.75	233	9.68	101	4.20	72	2.99	13	0.54	21	0.87	5	0.21	2	0.08	6	0.25	1	0.04	1	0.04	2	0.08	2	0.08	63	2.62	2,406
Avery	457	44.07	272	26.23	128	12.34	87	8.39	20	1.93	39	3.76	5	0.48	7	0.68	0	0	1	0.10	1	0.10	1	0.10	0	0	2	0.19	0	0	17	1.64	1,037
Beaufort	2,761	52.34	774	14.67	876	16.61	267	5.06	136	2.58	147	2.79	39	0.74	43	0.82	12	0.23	13	0.25	23	0.44	10	0.19	12	0.23	12	0.23	5	0.09	145	2.75	5,275
Bertie	1,803	56.68	513	16.13	460	14.46	74	2.33	29	0.91	58	1.82	18	0.57	38	1.19	13	0.41	7	0.22	18	0.57	10	0.31	4	0.13	12	0.38	3	0.09	121	3.80	3,181
Bladen	2,499	59.11	581	13.74	515	12.18	138	3.26	40	0.95	72	1.70	42	0.99	41	0.97	12	0.28	14	0.33	14	0.33	7	0.17	10	0.24	5	0.12	4	0.09	234	5.53	4,228
Brunswick	7,806	45.12	2,600	15.03	3,558	20.56	1,082	6.25	1,029	5.95	768	4.44	125	0.72	68	0.39	13	0.08	16	0.09	21	0.12	17	0.10	16	0.09	7	0.04	5	0.03	171	0.99	17,302
Buncombe	15,533	24.94	23,440	37.64	4,928	7.91	10,655	17.11	3,074	4.94	2,397	3.85	1,193	1.92	366	0.59	109	0.18	31	0.05	49	0.08	20	0.03	40	0.06	22	0.04	22	0.04	403	0.65	62,282
Burke	3,026	43.88	1,495	21.68	1,034	14.99	478	6.93	229	3.32	224	3.25	74	1.07	45	0.65	21	0.30	20	0.29	14	0.20	6	0.09	5	0.07	11	0.16	4	0.06	210	3.05	6,896
Cabarrus	10,666	49.97	5,364	25.13	2,348	11.00	1,682	7.88	390	1.83	275	1.29	108	0.51	107	0.50	44	0.21	36	0.17	28	0.13	14	0.07	12	0.06	10	0.05	14	0.07	248	1.16	21,346
Caldwell	1,853	41.72	1,041	23.44	683	15.38	301	6.78	187	4.21	116	2.61	39	0.88	31	0.70	17	0.38	10	0.23	8	0.18	8	0.18	7	0.16	5	0.11	3	0.07	133	2.99	4,442
Camden	403	51.47	118	15.07	126	16.09	53	6.77	29	3.70	13	1.66	4	0.51	3	0.38	0	0	1	0.13	0	0	3	0.38	1	0.13	2	0.26	0	0	27	3.45	783
Carteret	2,969	43.55	1,251	18.35	1,237	18.15	502	7.36	288	4.22	248	3.64	57	0.84	52	0.76	17	0.25	10	0.15	8	0.12	5	0.07	10	0.15	5	0.07	6	0.09	152	2.23	6,817
Caswell	1,473	48.09	569	18.58	476	15.54	143	4.67	46	1.50	55	1.80	27	0.88	21	0.69	7	0.23	8	0.26	10	0.33	6	0.20	13	0.42	2	0.07	4	0.13	203	6.63	3,063
Catawba	4,618	41.09	2,775	24.69	1,732	15.41	876	7.79	502	4.47	312	2.78	94	0.84	52	0.46	30	0.27	18	0.16	14	0.12	18	0.16	9	0.08	15	0.13	5	0.04	170	1.51	11,240
Chatham	6,455	37.44	3,408	19.77	2,794	16.21	2,388	13.85	845	4.90	700	4.06	103	0.60	123	0.71	38	0.22	17	0.10	21	0.12	19	0.11	17	0.10	20	0.12	16	0.09	276	1.60	17,240
Cherokee	831	43.30	446	23.24	246	12.82	140	7.30	66	3.44	55	2.87	21	1.09	19	0.99	10	0.52	3	0.16	4	0.21	4	0.21	6	0.31	8	0.42	3	0.16	57	2.97	1,919
Chowan	831	54.49	184	12.07	275	18.03	78	5.11	45	2.95	36	2.36	9	0.59	5	0.33	2	0.13	1	0.07	5	0.33	2	0.13	6	0.39	3	0.20	1	0.07	42	2.75	1,525
Clay	416	42.84	201	20.70	130	13.39	92	9.47	41	4.22	41	4.22	8	0.82	4	0.41	1	0.10	3	0.31	6	0.62	1	0.10	1	0.10	2	0.21	2	0.21	22	2.27	971
Cleveland	4,197	51.73	1,406	17.33	1,250	15.41	424	5.23	132	1.63	174	2.14	81	1.00	41	0.51	16	0.20	16	0.20	25	0.31	17	0.21	14	0.17	12	0.15	5	0.06	304	3.75	8,114
Columbus	2,566	54.43	832	17.65	525	11.14	197	4.18	45	0.95	89	1.89	53	1.12	30	0.64	14	0.30	21	0.45	21	0.45	18	0.38	21	0.45	15	0.32	1	0.02	266	5.64	4,714
Craven	5,100	48.81	1,748	16.73	1,894	18.13	565	5.41	391	3.74	301	2.88	70	0.67	48	0.46	26	0.25	19	0.18	25	0.24	6	0.06	11	0.11	10	0.10	2	0.02	233	2.23	10,449
Cumberland	19,559	54.40	7,393	20.56	4,822	13.41	1,921	5.34	533	1.48	373	1.04	171	0.48	167	0.46	98	0.27	103	0.29	84	0.23	35	0.10	44	0.12	27	0.08	28	0.08	595	1.65	35,953
Currituck	960	47.60	427	21.17	276	13.68	171	8.48	54	2.68	36	1.78	8	0.40	18	0.89	2	0.10	4	0.20	1	0.05	0	0	1	0.05	1	0.05	3	0.15	55	2.73	2,017
Dare	2,179	40.91	1,282	24.07	780	14.65	511	9.59	233	4.37	154	2.89	26	0.49	46	0.86	7	0.13	7	0.13	11	0.21	2	0.04	7	0.13	2	0.04	2	0.04	77	1.45	5,326
Davidson	4,472	45.04	2,234	22.50	1,503	15.14	569	5.73	346	3.49	283	2.85	64	0.64	75	0.76	33	0.33	16	0.16	14	0.14	9	0.09	10	0.10	60	0.60	15	0.15	225	2.27	9,928
Davie	1,275	40.27	706	22.30	552	17.44	238	7.52	133	4.20	118	3.73	21	0.66	21	0.66	9	0.28	4	0.13	4	0.13	7	0.22	6	0.19	9	0.28	4	0.13	59	1.86	3,166
Duplin	2,486	55.55	675	15.08	689	15.40	133	2.97	45	1.01	82	1.83	25	0.56	30	0.67	14	0.31	11	0.25	17	0.38	13	0.29	9	0.20	17	0.38	6	0.13	223	4.98	4,475
Durham	29,664	36.22	22,104	26.99	7,504	9.16	16,580	20.24	2,926	3.57	1,805	2.20	263	0.32	224	0.27	137	0.17	92	0.11	63	0.08	62	0.08	43	0.05	18	0.02	27	0.03	398	0.49	81,910
Edgecombe	3,982	56.29	1,043	14.74	1,198	16.94	252	3.56	73	1.03	80	1.13	44	0.62	53	0.75	16	0.23	25	0.35	28	0.40	20	0.28	14	0.20	14	0.20	4	0.06	228	3.22	7,074
Forsyth	23,929	42.69	14,296	25.51	7,797	13.91	5,307	9.47	2,166	3.86	1,152	2.06	203	0.36	182	0.32	131	0.23	109	0.19	77	0.14	43	0.08	52	0.09	27	0.05	29	0.05	547	0.98	56,047
Franklin	3,732	45.94	1,580	19.45	1,218	14.99	496	6.11	189	2.33	460	5.66	51	0.63	47	0.58	33	0.41	22	0.27	19	0.23	15	0.18	10	0.12	10	0.12	9	0.11	232	2.86	8,123
Gaston	7,920	46.94	4,043	23.96	2,159	12.80	1,207	7.15	478	2.83	345	2.04	146	0.87	89	0.53	36	0.21	29	0.17	23	0.14	27	0.16	16	0.09	8	0.05	10	0.06	336	1.99	16,872
Gates	751	53.19	221	15.65	226	16.01	71	5.03	15	1.06	25	1.77	10	0.71	12	0.85	5	0.35	5	0.35	11	0.78	5	0.35	1	0.07	3	0.21	1	0.07	50	3.54	1,412
Graham	249	43.23	97	16.84	69	11.98	33	5.73	12	2.08	28	4.86	29	5.03	6	1.04	2	0.35	1	0.17	5	0.87	0	0	2	0.35	0	0	0	0	43	7.47	576
Granville	3,472	46.05	1,583	20.99	1,062	14.08	471	6.25	220	2.92	192	2.55	55	0.73	68	0.90	17	0.23	17	0.23	19	0.25	26	0.34	16	0.21	13	0.17	6	0.08	303	4.02	7,540
Greene	1,098	49.64	417	18.85	315	14.24	82	3.71	19	0.86	52	2.35	31	1.40	11	0.50	13	0.59	10	0.45	9	0.41	8	0.36	8	0.36	5	0.23	3	0.14	131	5.92	2,212
Guilford	37,425	45.65	21,337	26.02	10,288	12.55	7,491	9.14	2,205	2.69	1,396	1.70	298	0.36	251	0.31	181	0.22	167	0.20	131	0.16	84	0.10	63	0.08	37	0.05	39	0.05	597	0.73	81,990
Halifax	4,844	62.02	1,131	14.48	882	11.29	259	3.32	73	0.93	103	1.32	32	0.41	67	0.86	15	0.19	21	0.27	39	0.50	21	0.27	12	0.15	12	0.15	4	0.05	296	3.79	7,811
Harnett	4,324	49.05	1,924	21.83	1,157	13.13	541	6.14	218	2.47	157	1.78	61	0.69	57	0.65	37	0.42	25	0.28	27	0.31	16	0.18	11	0.12	16	0.18	5	0.06	239	2.71	8,815
Haywood	3,446	40.31	1,952	22.84	849	9.93	769	9.00	382	4.47	356	4.16	352	4.12	66	0.77	23	0.27	12	0.14	17	0.20	7	0.08	16	0.19	3	0.04	5	0.06	293	3.43	8,548
Henderson	5,713	38.36	3,729	25.04	1,588	10.66	1,641	11.02	866	5.81	698	4.69	416	2.79	68	0.46	21	0.14	8	0.05	13	0.09	7	0.05	9	0.06	4	0.03	13	0.09	100	0.67	14,894
Hertford	2,377	60.90	433	11.09	534	13.68	103	2.64	32	0.82	44	1.13	11	0.28	38	0.97	7	0.18	13	0.33	14	0.36	7	0.18	4	0.10	9	0.23	2	0.05	275	7.05	3,903
Hoke	2,801	53.48	1,114	21.27	648	12.37	215	4.11	68	1.30	55	1.05	39	0.74	20	0.38	20	0.38	23	0.44	20	0.38	6	0.11	8	0.15	8	0.15	3	0.06	189	3.61	5,237
Hyde	380	47.38	128	15.96	86	10.72	83	10.35	7	0.87	23	2.87	10	1.25	6	0.75	6	0.75	0	0	4	0.50	0	0	1	0.12	4	0.50	1	0.12	63	7.86	802
Iredell	6,245	41.26	3,424	22.62	2,509	16.58	1,181	7.80	639	4.22	426	2.81	153	1.01	92	0.61	37	0.24	31	0.20	27	0.18	16	0.11	22	0.15	12	0.08	9	0.06	312	2.06	15,135
Jackson	1,867	31.99	1,868	32.00	475	8.14	689	11.80	266	4.56	193	3.31	215	3.68	58	0.99	18	0.31	3	0.05	7	0.12	7	0.12	9	0.15	19	0.33	2	0.03	141	2.42	5,837
Johnston	8,061	44.38	4,347	23.93	2,447	13.47	1,491	8.21	586	3.23	389	2.14	88	0.48	104	0.57	29	0.16	29	0.16	27	0.15	17	0.09	15	0.08	22	0.12	14	0.08	497	2.74	18,163
Jones	820	61.84	184	13.88	181	13.65	28	2.11	15	1.13	9	0.68	11	0.83	9	0.68	3	0.23	3	0.23	6	0.45	1	0.08	0	0	5	0.38	2	0.15	49	3.70	1,326
Lee	2,520	44.74	1,233	21.89	955	16.95	333	5.91	170	3.02	169	3.00	53	0.94	35	0.62	5	0.09	12	0.21	7	0.12	9	0.16	4	0.07	7	0.12	4	0.07	117	2.08	5,633
Lenoir	3,539	53.40	1,201	18.12	1,024	15.45	228	3.44	79	1.19	112	1.69	45	0.68	28	0.42	15	0.23	18	0.27	28	0.42	16	0.24	9	0.14	14	0.21	3	0.05	268	4.04	6,627
Lincoln	2,896	46.66	1,244	20.04	1,040	16.76	373	6.01	207	3.33	140	2.26	71	1.14	36	0.58	21	0.34	9	0.14	8	0.13	10	0.16	5	0.08	8	0.13	2	0.03	137	2.21	6,207
Macon	1,445	39.82	739	20.36	460	12.68	304	8.38	172	4.74	158	4.35	205	5.65	30	0.83	7	0.19	10	0.28	5	0.14	0	0	5	0.14	7	0.19	2	0.06	80	2.20	3,629
Madison	1,066	27.40	1,295	33.29	314	8.07	481	12.37	109	2.80	166	4.27	154	3.96	54	1.39	18	0.46	9	0.23	10	0.26	9	0.23	7	0.18	5	0.13	1	0.03	192	4.94	3,890
Martin	2,132	60.53	441	12.52	400	11.36	131	3.72	37	1.05	70	1.99	33	0.94	22	0.62	6	0.17	7	0.20	9	0.26	7	0.20	5	0.14	6	0.17	2	0.06	214	6.08	3,522
McDowell	1,317	38.67	871	25.57	306	8.98	280	8.22	105	3.08	92	2.70	160	4.70	37	1.09	13	0.38	1	0.03	9	0.26	6	0.18	3	0.09	3	0.09	2	0.06	201	5.90	3,406
Mecklenburg	72,713	44.77	39,648	24.41	22,322	13.74	16,586	10.21	5,458	3.36	2,786	1.72	862	0.53	505	0.31	298	0.18	217	0.13	102	0.06	114	0.07	88	0.05	65	0.04	51	0.03	615	0.38	162,430
Mitchell	266	29.59	324	36.04	73	8.12	128	14.24	19	2.11	36	4.00	30	3.34	3	0.33	2	0.22	0	0	0	0	1	0.11	2	0.22	1	0.11	2	0.22	12	1.33	899
Montgomery	1,320	50.97	416	16.06	374	14.44	121	4.67	46	1.78	62	2.39	29	1.12	25	0.97	10	0.39	6	0.23	16	0.62	7	0.27	5	0.19	8	0.31	3	0.12	142	5.48	2,590
Moore	4,896	49.06	1,610	16.13	1,833	18.37	782	7.84	336	3.37	233	2.33	42	0.42	44	0.44	18	0.18	17	0.17	8	0.08	2	0.02	8	0.08	2	0.02	1	0.01	147	1.47	9,979
Nash	6,534	54.15	2,134	17.68	2,002	16.59	480	3.98	138	1.14	228	1.89	66	0.55	63	0.52	28	0.23	22	0.18	23	0.19	12	0.10	18	0.15	15	0.12	5	0.04	299	2.48	12,067
New Hanover	12,332	36.65	9,165	27.24	5,173	15.37	3,540	10.52	1,641	4.88	979	2.91	174	0.52	150	0.45	74	0.22	38	0.11	33	0.10	17	0.05	23	0.07	10	0.03	7	0.02	295	0.88	33,651
Northampton	2,656	58.70	499	11.03	505	11.16	126	2.78	46	1.02	83	1.83	23	0.51	89	1.97	20	0.44	18	0.40	32	0.71	11	0.24	12	0.27	9	0.20	8	0.18	388	8.57	4,525
Onslow	4,972	52.40	2,021	21.30	1,173	12.36	605	6.38	201	2.12	137	1.44	62	0.65	36	0.38	29	0.31	18	0.19	18	0.19	12	0.13	12	0.13	4	0.04	4	0.04	184	1.94	9,488
Orange	13,029	29.24	12,772	28.66	4,554	10.22	10,322	23.17	1,808	4.06	1,333	2.99	96	0.22	192	0.43	99	0.22	28	0.06	18	0.04	20	0.04	23	0.05	8	0.02	12	0.03	244	0.55	44,558
Pamlico	948	54.14	213	12.16	274	15.65	83	4.74	54	3.08	57	3.26	14	0.80	10	0.57	5	0.29	6	0.34	4	0.23	6	0.34	5	0.29	6	0.34	3	0.17	63	3.60	1,751
Pasquotank	2,415	56.57	663	15.53	628	14.71	183	4.29	89	2.08	96	2.25	23	0.54	18	0.42	9	0.21	20	0.47	7	0.16	6	0.14	4	0.09	1	0.02	0	0	107	2.51	4,269
Pender	2,513	45.72	1,191	21.67	861	15.66	392	7.13	221	4.02	139	2.53	41	0.75	31	0.56	7	0.13	5	0.09	14	0.25	6	0.11	5	0.09	2	0.04	5	0.09	64	1.16	5,497
Perquimans	594	45.27	175	13.34	262	19.97	58	4.42	31	2.36	54	4.12	12	0.91	18	1.37	4	0.30	1	0.08	5	0.38	3	0.23	4	0.30	20	1.52	2	0.15	69	5.26	1,312
Person	2,329	51.10	777	17.05	654	14.35	293	6.43	80	1.76	106	2.33	42	0.92	49	1.08	12	0.26	9	0.20	12	0.26	6	0.13	5	0.11	6	0.13	3	0.07	175	3.84	4,558
Pitt	10,329	48.14	5,105	23.79	2,639	12.30	1,554	7.24	602	2.81	454	2.12	117	0.55	92	0.43	47	0.22	38	0.18	31	0.14	27	0.13	25	0.12	8	0.04	13	0.06	376	1.75	21,457
Polk	1,066	41.85	521	20.46	299	11.74	284	11.15	132	5.18	106	4.16	96	3.77	17	0.67	3	0.12	2	0.08	2	0.08	3	0.12	2	0.08	5	0.20	0	0	9	0.35	2,547
Randolph	2,788	41.11	1,734	25.57	1,083	15.97	500	7.37	223	3.29	171	2.52	33	0.49	44	0.65	21	0.31	15	0.22	13	0.19	4	0.06	4	0.06	11	0.16	6	0.09	131	1.93	6,781
Richmond	2,654	53.79	701	14.21	693	14.05	175	3.55	72	1.46	85	1.72	59	1.20	44	0.89	20	0.41	18	0.36	15	0.30	14	0.28	10	0.20	15	0.30	3	0.06	356	7.22	4,934
Robeson	6,300	43.29	2,382	16.37	1,380	9.48	532	3.66	136	0.93	261	1.79	858	5.90	153	1.05	67	0.46	78	0.54	77	0.53	60	0.41	47	0.32	51	0.35	25	0.17	2,145	14.74	14,552
Rockingham	3,571	46.21	1,506	19.49	1,551	20.07	360	4.66	165	2.14	172	2.23	44	0.57	57	0.74	15	0.19	17	0.22	15	0.19	13	0.17	9	0.12	13	0.17	5	0.06	214	2.77	7,727
Rowan	4,799	46.14	2,393	23.01	1,507	14.49	662	6.37	298	2.87	226	2.17	102	0.98	59	0.57	26	0.25	27	0.26	21	0.20	14	0.13	11	0.11	13	0.13	11	0.11	231	2.22	10,400
Rutherford	2,153	47.01	1,146	25.02	403	8.80	276	6.03	98	2.14	105	2.29	200	4.37	37	0.81	11	0.24	3	0.07	9	0.20	6	0.13	8	0.17	5	0.11	1	0.02	119	2.60	4,580
Sampson	2,839	55.44	862	16.83	818	15.97	213	4.16	53	1.03	62	1.21	27	0.53	26	0.51	11	0.21	14	0.27	20	0.39	9	0.18	9	0.18	5	0.10	5	0.10	148	2.89	5,121
Scotland	2,075	55.16	529	14.06	330	8.77	155	4.12	65	1.73	95	2.53	212	5.64	43	1.14	13	0.35	17	0.45	8	0.21	5	0.13	7	0.19	11	0.29	4	0.11	193	5.13	3,762
Stanly	1,775	47.50	740	19.80	537	14.37	223	5.97	101	2.70	89	2.38	58	1.55	34	0.91	14	0.37	9	0.24	2	0.05	8	0.21	7	0.19	9	0.24	2	0.05	129	3.45	3,737
Stokes	1,213	40.22	681	22.58	533	17.67	174	5.77	92	3.05	74	2.45	38	1.26	21	0.70	4	0.13	5	0.17	6	0.20	6	0.20	4	0.13	3	0.10	2	0.07	160	5.31	3,016
Surry	1,949	41.60	1,021	21.79	827	17.65	305	6.51	119	2.54	147	3.14	42	0.90	37	0.79	14	0.30	8	0.17	14	0.30	5	0.11	5	0.11	12	0.26	6	0.13	174	3.71	4,685
Swain	554	34.69	470	29.43	161	10.08	111	6.95	64	4.01	58	3.63	82	5.13	21	1.31	5	0.31	3	0.19	2	0.13	4	0.25	1	0.06	4	0.25	2	0.13	55	3.44	1,597
Transylvania	1,890	35.83	1,288	24.42	552	10.46	692	13.12	298	5.65	304	5.76	148	2.81	33	0.63	7	0.13	0	0	6	0.11	1	0.02	5	0.09	2	0.04	0	0	49	0.93	5,275
Tyrrell	220	39.36	91	16.28	98	17.53	22	3.94	15	2.68	20	3.58	4	0.72	7	1.25	2	0.36	0	0	6	1.07	1	0.18	0	0	2	0.36	1	0.18	70	12.52	559
Union	9,117	44.44	4,587	22.36	3,069	14.96	1,767	8.61	844	4.11	506	2.47	157	0.77	103	0.50	42	0.20	31	0.15	24	0.12	20	0.10	19	0.09	11	0.05	10	0.05	207	1.01	20,514
Vance	3,348	59.20	794	14.04	768	13.58	217	3.84	58	1.03	87	1.54	36	0.64	46	0.81	12	0.21	21	0.37	20	0.35	11	0.19	11	0.19	7	0.12	8	0.14	211	3.73	5,655
Wake	79,007	40.53	50,919	26.12	23,544	12.08	27,837	14.28	6,821	3.50	3,759	1.93	505	0.26	812	0.42	403	0.21	175	0.09	121	0.06	89	0.05	85	0.04	35	0.02	51	0.03	763	0.39	194,926
Warren	2,211	57.49	548	14.25	480	12.48	132	3.43	46	1.20	68	1.77	22	0.57	38	0.99	10	0.26	20	0.52	12	0.31	12	0.31	14	0.36	43	1.12	6	0.16	184	4.78	3,846
Washington	1,079	55.82	292	15.11	269	13.92	56	2.90	13	0.67	43	2.22	38	1.97	12	0.62	6	0.31	4	0.21	4	0.21	4	0.21	6	0.31	6	0.31	3	0.16	98	5.07	1,933
Watauga	2,298	23.13	4,707	47.38	716	7.21	1,336	13.45	469	4.72	245	2.47	49	0.49	37	0.37	26	0.26	8	0.08	3	0.03	7	0.07	4	0.04	2	0.02	1	0.01	26	0.26	9,934
Wayne	5,781	49.69	2,340	20.11	1,672	14.37	493	4.24	207	1.78	198	1.70	115	0.99	76	0.65	32	0.28	55	0.47	39	0.34	18	0.15	29	0.25	12	0.10	11	0.09	556	4.78	11,634
Wilkes	1,787	45.02	873	22.00	634	15.97	247	6.22	87	2.19	84	2.12	22	0.55	18	0.45	6	0.15	7	0.18	7	0.18	7	0.18	3	0.08	3	0.08	4	0.10	180	4.54	3,969
Wilson	5,063	52.06	1,928	19.82	1,546	15.90	409	4.21	143	1.47	149	1.53	61	0.63	61	0.63	26	0.27	25	0.26	34	0.35	19	0.20	10	0.10	13	0.13	14	0.14	225	2.31	9,726
Yadkin	784	41.68	461	24.51	302	16.06	120	6.38	46	2.45	50	2.66	13	0.69	15	0.80	1	0.05	2	0.11	4	0.21	1	0.05	2	0.11	2	0.11	0	0	78	4.15	1,881
Yancey	848	34.77	709	29.07	206	8.45	318	13.04	79	3.24	79	3.24	76	3.12	27	1.11	3	0.12	2	0.08	4	0.16	4	0.16	2	0.08	5	0.21	0	0	77	3.16	2,439
Total	572,271	42.95	322,645	24.22	172,558	12.95	139,912	10.50	43,632	3.27	30,742	2.31	10,679	0.80	6,622	0.50	2,973	0.22	2,181	0.16	1,978	0.15	1,341	0.10	1,243	0.09	1,098	0.08	699	0.05	21,808	1.64	1,332,382

== Notes ==
Additional candidates

== See also ==
- 2020 North Carolina Republican presidential primary
