= Latino Victory =

American political action committee

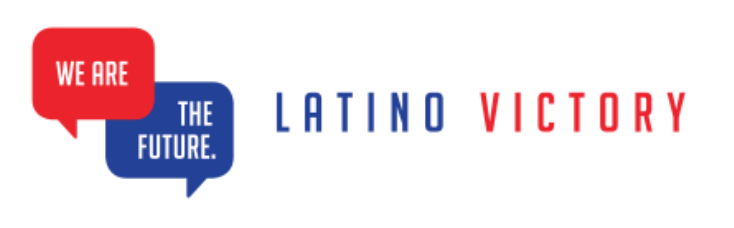
- Formation: 2014
- Legal status: 501(c)(3), PAC
- Purpose: Hispanic-American political participation
- Headquarters: Washington, D.C.
- Volunteers: 100+
- Website: latinovictory.us

Latino Victory is an American progressive initiative founded in 2014 by Henry R. Muñoz III and actress Eva Longoria. The goal is to improve the representation of the Latino community in local and national elections by funding candidates, raising awareness of Hispanic issues, and building a community of political talent and resources for Latino causes. Latino Victory has three components: Latino Victory Foundation, Latino Victory Fund (PAC), Latino Victory Project.

== History ==
Since founded Latino Victory has been under the leadership of a strong group of individuals linked to progressive politics and the ecosystem of national Latino organizations in the United States. Leopoldo Martinez Nucete was the organization’s first Chair of the Board (until 2017), a key player in Latino politics with the Democratic Party as a DNC member, and a leading voice in Latin American foreign policy. The current Chair of the Board is Luis Miranda Jr., a key figure in New York City politics, as well as nationwide Latino politics. Miranda Jr. was the founder of Hispanic Federation, and the father of the formidable Broadway and Hollywood talent Lin-Manuel Miranda. Two Presidents and CEOs have been key to the success of the Latino Victory: Cristóbal Joshua Alex, who was Hillary Clinton’s campaign Latino political operative, and Joe Biden’s Senior Advisor; and currently Nathalie Rayes, a Venezuelan-American who was played leadership roles in California politics, and also with national Hispanic organizations, such as Chair of Hispanic Federation. Her leadership roles also include organizations such as Planned Parenthood and the Aspen Institute.

It has endorsed several elections candidates.

In 2022, it sought to keep Democratic Party organizing attention in Florida by endorsing Maxwell Alejandro Frost and Annette Taddeo.
