= Cristóbal Alex =

American lawyer & political operative

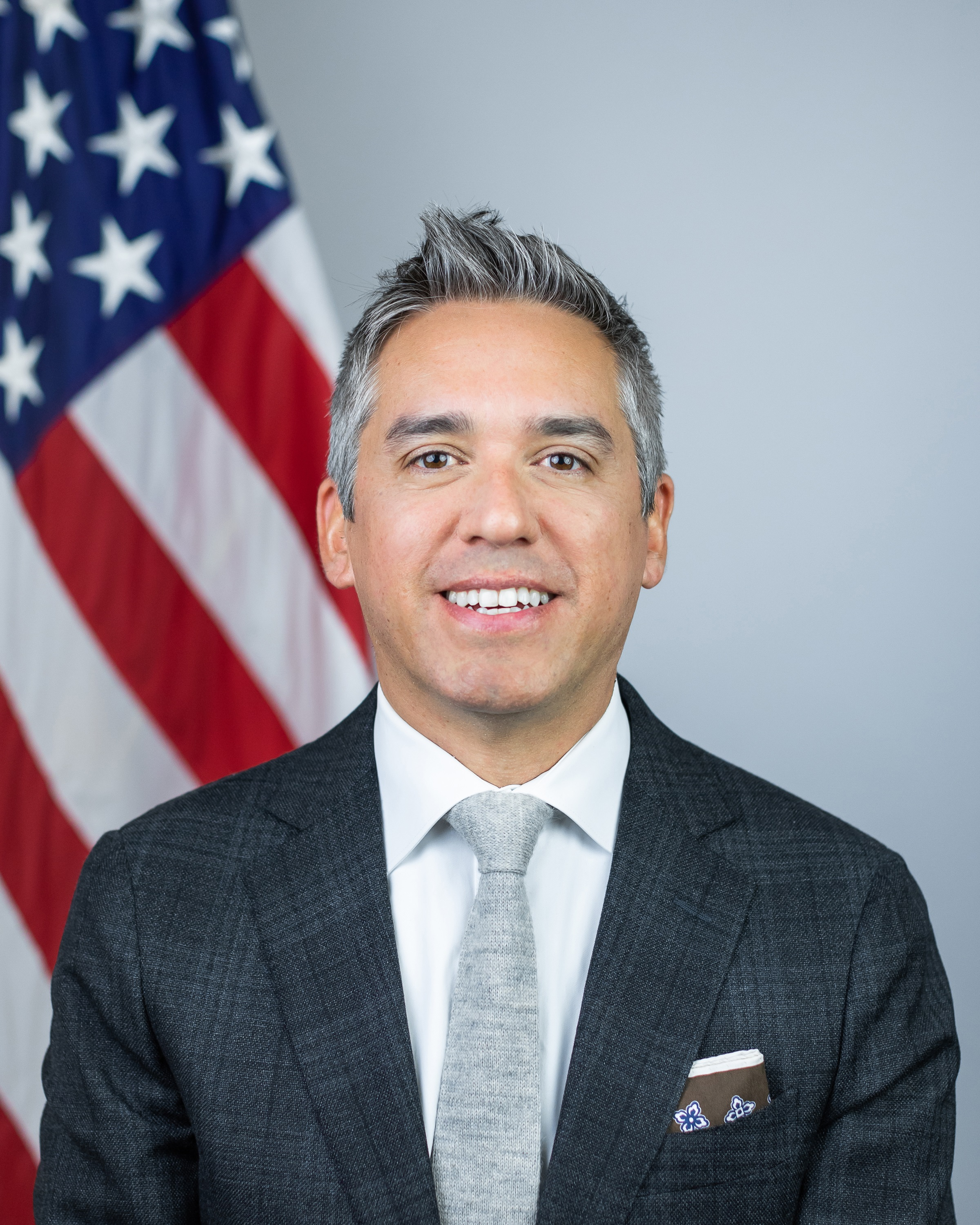

Deputy White House Cabinet Secretary
- In office January 20, 2021 – May 13, 2022
- President: Joe Biden
- Leader: Evan Ryan
- Succeeded by: Nik Blosser

Cristóbal Alex is an American lawyer, political operative, and former government official.

== Education ==
Alex received a Juris Doctor degree from the University of Washington School of Law in 2001.

== Career ==
From 2001 to 2004, Alex was Law Clerk of the Washington Court of Appeals. From 2014 to 2019, he was president of Latino Victory. He worked on the Hillary Clinton 2016 presidential campaign as deputy director of Voter Outreach and Mobilization.

Alex worked on the Joe Biden 2020 presidential campaign as a senior advisor and a member of the Presidential transition of Joe Biden. He was sworn into the Biden administration as Deputy White House Cabinet Secretary on January 20, 2021. He resigned on May 13, 2022.
