= Greg Schultz =

American political advisor (born 1981)

Personal details
- Born: 1981 (age 44–45) Parma, Ohio, U.S.
- Party: Democratic
- Education: Ohio State University (BA, MEd)

Greg Schultz (born 1981) is an American political advisor. He served as the campaign manager and general election strategist for the Joe Biden 2020 presidential campaign, the senior advisor to Vice President Biden under President Barack Obama, and the deputy political director in Ohio for the Barack Obama 2008 presidential campaign and the Ohio State Director for the Barack Obama 2012 presidential campaign.

== Early life and education ==
Schultz was born in Parma, Ohio and raised in North Royalton, Ohio, where he graduated from North Royalton High School. His parents both taught special education and Schultz himself planned on becoming a teacher before pivoting to politics.

Schultz earned a Bachelor of Arts degree in history and political science from Ohio State University and a Master of Education, also from Ohio State University.

In 2014, he was awarded the Distinguished Alumni Award from the Ohio State's Department of Political Science.

== Career ==
=== 2008 and 2012 campaigns ===
After working on local and statewide campaigns throughout Ohio, Schultz served as Ohio Political Director for the Hillary Clinton 2008 presidential campaign from February to March 2008 ahead of her victory in the 2008 Ohio Democratic presidential primary. Afterwards, he held the role of Deputy Political Director for the Obama/Biden presidential campaigns in Ohio in 2008 and Ohio State Director for the Obama/Biden campaign in 2012. He also worked as the state director of the Ohio chapter of Organizing for America. In between campaign cycles, Schultz served as the executive assistant to Ohio Governor Ted Strickland.

During the 2012 campaign, Schultz stepped in to help with the successful referendum on Ohio's House Bill 194, a GOP backed piece of legislation that sought to limit voter access across the state.

=== White House ===
In 2013, Greg joined the Obama-Biden administration as senior advisor for Vice President Biden and special assistant to President Barack Obama. His work with the vice president included launching Cancer Moonshot, an initiative to help fight cancer by enabling researchers to easily share resources and information, and co-founding It's On Us, a movement fighting to end rape and sexual assault on college campuses.

=== Biden 2020 Campaign ===
Leading up to the 2020 campaign, Schultz served as the executive director of Biden's American Possibilities PAC.

Schultz was the architect and national campaign manager of Joe Biden's primary campaign. Schultz then shifted to the role of general election strategist and senior advisor, where he oversaw and executed strategy between the Democratic National Committee, state parties, Biden's own team, and other political players. Said Biden on Schultz's role as general election strategist, "Greg's talent and leadership have been an important part of this campaign's success since the beginning, and I'm grateful he's taking on this new role to help ensure we run a well-organized and effective general election campaign to beat Donald Trump and restore the soul of this nation."

Schultz spoke about his campaign experience as the inaugural guest on David Plouffe’s podcast, which focuses on the inside workings of presidential campaigns.
