= 2020 North Carolina Republican presidential primary =

- March 3, 2020

71 Republican National Convention delegates

Candidate	Donald Trump	No preference
Home state	Florida	N/A
Delegate count	71	0
Popular vote	750,600	20,085
Percentage	93.53%	2.50%

The 2020 North Carolina Republican presidential primary took place on March 3, 2020, as one of fourteen contests scheduled for Super Tuesday in the Republican Party presidential primaries for the 2020 presidential election.

== Results ==
2020 North Carolina Republican primary
Candidate	Popular vote		Delegates
Candidate	Count	Percentage	Delegates
Donald Trump	750,600	93.53%	71
Joe Walsh	16,356	2.04%	0
Bill Weld	15,486	1.93%	0
No Preference	20,085	2.50%	0
Total	802,527	100%	71

=== Results by county ===
2020 North Carolina Republican primary (results per county)
County	Donald Trump		Joe Walsh		Bill Weld		No Preference		Total votes cast
County	Votes	%	Votes	%	Votes	%	Votes	%	Total votes cast
Alamance	12,843	94.08	259	1.90	208	1.52	341	2.50	13,651
Alexander	5,402	96.43	71	1.27	53	0.95	76	1.36	5,602
Alleghany	1,433	95.85	21	1.40	9	0.60	32	2.14	1,495
Anson	1,145	97.36	13	1.11	6	0.51	12	1.02	1,176
Ashe	3,321	94.24	86	2.44	39	1.11	78	2.21	3,524
Avery	3,748	93.54	77	1.92	61	1.52	121	3.02	4,007
Beaufort	5,332	95.88	78	1.40	63	1.13	88	1.58	5,561
Bertie	735	97.87	8	1.07	2	0.27	6	0.80	751
Bladen	3,044	97.91	23	0.74	12	0.39	30	0.96	3,109
Brunswick	15,269	94.17	291	1.79	273	1.68	382	2.36	16,215
Buncombe	17,893	92.52	431	2.23	476	2.46	539	2.79	19,339
Burke	7,547	95.23	121	1.53	94	1.19	163	2.06	7,925
Cabarrus	16,516	92.93	403	2.27	347	1.95	506	2.85	17,772
Caldwell	8,044	96.19	118	1.41	89	1.06	112	1.34	8,363
Camden	1,348	94.53	23	1.61	28	1.96	27	1.89	1,426
Carteret	10,696	95.25	172	1.53	138	1.23	223	1.99	11,229
Caswell	1,587	97.84	15	0.92	8	0.49	12	0.74	1,622
Catawba	18,807	93.74	411	2.05	337	1.68	508	2.53	20,063
Chatham	5,793	92.78	127	2.03	185	2.96	139	2.23	6,244
Cherokee	5,030	95.14	83	1.57	77	1.46	97	1.83	5,287
Chowan	1,239	96.50	11	0.86	9	0.70	25	1.95	1,284
Clay	2,237	94.51	33	1.39	37	1.56	60	2.53	2,367
Cleveland	8,049	96.73	79	0.95	79	0.95	114	1.37	8,321
Columbus	3,521	98.05	19	0.53	16	0.45	35	0.97	3,591
Craven	10,937	94.96	178	1.55	160	1.39	243	2.11	11,518
Cumberland	13,965	94.21	286	1.93	219	1.48	354	2.39	14,824
Currituck	3,658	92.75	80	2.03	65	1.65	141	3.58	3,944
Dare	3,082	93.65	79	2.40	66	2.01	64	1.94	3,291
Davidson	18,716	95.45	304	1.55	229	1.17	359	1.83	19,608
Davie	6,753	92.25	163	2.23	147	2.01	257	3.51	7,320
Duplin	4,252	97.57	26	0.60	20	0.46	60	1.38	4,358
Durham	6,768	83.74	424	5.25	505	6.25	385	4.76	8,082
Edgecombe	1,828	96.46	13	0.69	12	0.63	42	2.22	1,895
Forsyth	23,307	90.19	784	3.03	745	2.88	1,005	3.89	25,841
Franklin	5,011	94.98	97	1.84	57	1.08	111	2.10	5,276
Gaston	16,573	95.26	290	1.67	211	1.21	324	1.86	17,398
Gates	529	95.83	9	1.63	5	0.91	9	1.63	552
Graham	1,513	97.11	17	1.09	15	0.96	13	0.83	1,558
Granville	3,315	95.64	56	1.62	38	1.10	57	1.64	3,466
Greene	1,474	98.60	10	0.67	3	0.20	8	0.54	1,495
Guilford	27,561	91.32	828	2.74	790	2.62	1,003	3.32	30,182
Halifax	2,035	97.51	22	1.05	9	0.43	21	1.01	2,087
Harnett	9,093	95.56	124	1.30	112	1.18	186	1.95	9,515
Haywood	7,079	94.77	111	1.49	113	1.51	167	2.24	7,470
Henderson	16,339	94.70	252	1.46	277	1.61	386	2.24	17,254
Hertford	605	97.42	7	1.13	6	0.97	3	0.48	621
Hoke	1,916	94.95	32	1.59	27	1.34	43	2.13	2,018
Hyde	339	97.98	3	0.87	3	0.87	1	0.29	346
Iredell	21,150	93.18	501	2.21	376	1.66	672	2.96	22,699
Jackson	3,143	93.13	75	2.22	67	1.99	90	2.67	3,375
Johnston	19,073	94.89	350	1.74	257	1.28	420	2.09	20,100
Jones	1,021	97.80	8	0.77	4	0.38	11	1.05	1,044
Lee	3,648	95.40	52	1.36	48	1.26	76	1.99	3,824
Lenoir	4,822	96.83	46	0.92	32	0.64	80	1.61	4,980
Lincoln	10,616	94.10	216	1.91	168	1.49	282	2.50	11,282
Macon	5,527	94.61	111	1.90	79	1.35	125	2.14	5,842
Madison	2,073	96.37	26	1.21	16	0.74	36	1.67	2,151
Martin	1,370	97.23	17	1.21	8	0.57	14	0.99	1,409
McDowell	6,392	94.31	134	1.98	86	1.27	166	2.45	6,778
Mecklenburg	33,693	87.34	1,548	4.01	1,738	4.51	1,600	4.15	38,579
Mitchell	3,893	93.27	90	2.16	74	1.77	117	2.80	4,174
Montgomery	2,516	96.84	19	0.73	25	0.96	38	1.46	2,598
Moore	13,518	92.34	297	2.03	331	2.26	494	3.37	14,640
Nash	8,367	96.53	80	0.92	72	0.83	149	1.72	8,668
New Hanover	16,699	90.87	501	2.73	525	2.86	652	3.55	18,377
Northampton	659	97.34	4	0.59	4	0.59	10	1.48	677
Onslow	14,087	95.08	210	1.42	163	1.10	356	2.40	14,816
Orange	4,312	86.67	199	4.00	286	5.75	178	3.58	4,975
Pamlico	1,667	95.48	29	1.66	18	1.03	32	1.83	1,746
Pasquotank	2,081	94.94	40	1.82	21	0.96	50	2.28	2,192
Pender	5,339	96.25	56	1.01	69	1.24	83	1.50	5,547
Perquimans	1,213	95.89	16	1.26	14	1.11	22	1.74	1,265
Person	2,757	97.15	31	1.09	19	0.67	31	1.09	2,838
Pitt	10,327	94.66	212	1.94	133	1.22	237	2.17	10,909
Polk	2,157	95.87	34	1.51	31	1.38	28	1.24	2,250
Randolph	15,612	96.44	195	1.20	155	0.96	226	1.40	16,188
Richmond	2,946	96.84	31	1.02	18	0.59	47	1.55	3,042
Robeson	3,620	95.89	57	1.51	26	0.69	72	1.91	3,775
Rockingham	8,190	96.59	103	1.21	58	0.68	128	1.51	8,479
Rowan	14,447	95.35	235	1.55	195	1.29	274	1.81	15,151
Rutherford	7,214	95.50	104	1.38	95	1.26	141	1.87	7,554
Sampson	4,942	97.15	42	0.83	34	0.67	69	1.36	5,087
Scotland	1,102	95.41	20	1.73	13	1.13	20	1.73	1,155
Stanly	8,195	94.75	184	2.13	90	1.04	180	2.08	8,649
Stokes	7,316	95.14	112	1.46	71	0.92	191	2.48	7,690
Surry	7,259	95.19	118	1.55	87	1.14	162	2.12	7,626
Swain	1,128	94.00	23	1.92	18	1.50	31	2.58	1,200
Transylvania	3,797	94.71	60	1.50	68	1.70	84	2.10	4,009
Tyrrell	225	96.57	3	1.29	1	0.43	4	1.72	233
Union	21,182	94.76	371	1.66	378	1.69	422	1.89	22,353
Vance	1,210	96.11	19	1.51	12	0.95	18	1.43	1,259
Wake	52,255	88.57	2,025	3.43	2,518	4.27	2,199	3.73	58,997
Warren	791	95.53	12	1.45	11	1.33	14	1.69	828
Washington	641	96.68	5	0.75	7	1.06	10	1.51	663
Watauga	3,619	91.76	101	2.56	125	3.17	99	2.51	3,944
Wayne	10,479	96.36	109	1.00	93	0.86	194	1.78	10,875
Wilkes	10,885	95.02	171	1.49	147	1.28	252	2.20	11,455
Wilson	5,278	96.58	57	1.04	48	0.88	82	1.50	5,465
Yadkin	6,352	95.89	105	1.59	44	0.66	123	1.86	6,624
Yancey	2,568	96.98	24	0.91	30	1.13	26	0.98	2,648
Total	750,600	93.53%	16,356	2.04%	15,486	1.93%	20,085	2.50%	802,527
