= 2025 New York City ballot proposals =

Five citywide ballot proposals appeared on the general election ballot in New York City on November 4, 2025. One statewide proposal, Proposal 1, also appeared on the city ballot.

Proposal 1 passed with a majority of the statewide vote. Proposals 2, 3, and 4, which all dealt with affordable housing or land use, passed. Proposal 5, allowing for the creation of a digitized central city map, also passed. Proposal 6, which would have moved local elections to be in line with presidential election years, was not passed.

== Background ==
Proposals 2, 3, 4, and 5, which would amend the city's charter, were developed by New York City's Charter Revision Commission.

Proposals 2, 3, and 4 were challenged by the Speaker of the New York City Council, Adrienne Adams. She alleged that the ballot language was unfair, but the wording was upheld by the New York City Board of Elections by a vote of 7–1.

The City Council has spent an estimated $13,000 on digital ads, and an unknown amount on postage for paper mailers, to tell voters that Proposals 2, 3, and 4 are “misleading” and would “take away your power”.

== Proposal 1 ==
Proposal 1 is a statewide ballot proposal seeking to remedy a constitutional violation and enact a land swap between Adirondack Park and the Mount Van Hoevenberg Olympic Sports Complex.

== Proposal 2 ==
Proposal 2 would increase the speed of the public review process for some affordable housing projects.

2025 New York City Proposal 2
- November 4, 2025
- Fast Track Affordable Housing to Build More Affordable Housing Across the City

Results
Choice	Votes	%
Yes	1,108,815	58.52%
No	785,970	41.48%
Total votes	1,894,785	100.00%

Yes
>90%
80-90%
70–80%
60–70%
50–60%
No
>90%
80-90%
70-80%
60–70%
50–60%

=== Endorsements ===
Yes

Statewide officials

- Kathy Hochul, Governor of New York (2021–present) (Democratic)
- Andrew Cuomo, former Governor of New York (2011–2021) (Democratic)

State legislators

- Zohran Mamdani, state assemblymember from the 36th district (2021–present) (Democratic)

Local officials

- Eric Adams, mayor of New York City (2022–present) (Democratic)
- Brad Lander, New York City Comptroller (2022–present) (Democratic)
- Mark Levine, Manhattan Borough President (2022–present) (Democratic)
- Lincoln Restler, New York City councilmember from the 33rd district (2022–present) (Democratic)
- Antonio Reynoso, Brooklyn Borough President (2022–present) (Democratic)
- Donovan Richards, Queens Borough President (2020–present) (Democratic)

Organizations

- Citizens Union
- Habitat for Humanity New York City and Westchester County
- League of Women Voters New York City
- Open New York
- Regional Plan Association

Newspapers

- New York Post
No

U.S. representatives

- Nicole Malliotakis, NY-11 (2021–present) (Republican)

State legislators

- Andrew Lanza, state senator from the 24th district (2007–present) (Republican)
- Jaime Williams, state assemblymember from the 59th district (2016–present) (Democratic)

Local officials

- Adrienne Adams, Speaker of the New York City Council (2022–present) from the 28th district (2017–present) (Democratic)
- Joann Ariola, Minority Leader of the New York City Council (2025–present) from the 32nd district (2022–present) (Republican)
- Diana Ayala, Deputy Speaker of the New York City Council (2022–present) from the 8th district (2018–present) (Democratic)
- David Carr, former Minority Leader of the New York City Council (2025) from the 50th district (2021–present) (Republican)
- Amanda Farías, Majority Leader of the New York City Council (2024–present) from the 18th district (2022–present) (Democratic)
- Robert Holden, New York City councilmember from the 30th district (2018–present) (Democratic)
- Kristy Marmorato, New York City councilmember from the 13th district (2024–present) (Republican)
- Darlene Mealy, New York City councilmember from the 41st district (2006–2017, 2022–present) (Democratic)
- Lynn Schulman, New York City councilmember from the 29th district (2022–present) (Democratic)
- Inna Vernikov, New York City councilmember from the 48th district (2021–present) (Republican)
- Susan Zhuang, New York City councilmember from the 43rd district (2024–present) (Democratic)

Individuals

- Curtis Sliwa, founder of the Guardian Angels (Republican)

Labor unions

- District Council 37
- Hotel and Gaming Trades Council
- NYC District Council of Carpenters
- SEIU 32BJ
- United Federation of Teachers

Organizations

- New York Young Republican Club

Newspapers

- Pirate Wires
Declined to endorse

Local officials

- Chris Banks, New York City councilmember from the 42nd district (2024–present) (Democratic) (Note: Stated their opposition to the proposal, but did not directly endorse against it)
- Gale Brewer, New York City councilmember from the 6th district (2002–2013, 2022–present) (Democratic)
- Crystal Hudson, New York City councilmember from the 35th district (2022–present) (Democratic)
- Kevin Riley, New York City councilmember from the 12th district (2021–present) (Democratic)
- Julie Won, New York City councilmember from the 26th district (2022–present) (Democratic)

Labor unions

- Professional Staff Congress

Organizations

- Jews for Racial and Economic Justice

=== Polling ===
Poll source	Date(s) administered	Sample size (Note: Key: A – all adults RV – registered voters LV – likely voters V – unclear)	Margin of error	Yes	No	Undecided
Zenith Research (Note: This poll was sponsored by Yes On Affordable Housing, which supports ballot measures 2, 3, 4, and 5)	October 14–20, 2025	836 (LV)	± 3.4%	72%	16%	12%
Morning Consult (Note: This poll was sponsored by the Partnership for New York City, which supports ballot measures 2, 3, and 4)	October 16–18, 2025	581 (RV)	± 4.0%	70%	13%	17%
Global Strategy Group (D) (Note: This poll was sponsored by Robin Hood, which supports ballot measures 2, 3, 4, and 5)	July 28–31, 2025	1,000 (LV)	± 3.1%	67%	22%	11%

=== Results ===
New York City Proposal 2
Choice	Votes	%
For	1,108,815	58.52
Against	785,970	41.48
Total	1,894,785	100.00
Source: New York City Board of Elections

== Proposal 3 ==
Proposal 3 would create a secondary, faster review process for some land use projects. It would create an Expedited Land Use Review Procedure, which would follow a 90-day review process rather than the current Uniform Land Use Review Procedure's 7-month review process.

2025 New York City Proposal 3
- November 4, 2025
- Simplify Review of Modest Housing and Infrastructure Projects

Results
Choice	Votes	%
Yes	1,064,325	56.94%
No	804,832	43.06%
Total votes	1,869,157	100.00%

Yes
>90%
80-90%
70–80%
60–70%
50–60%
No
>90%
80-90%
70-80%
60–70%
50–60%

=== Endorsements ===
Yes

Statewide officials

- Kathy Hochul, Governor of New York (2021–present) (Democratic)
- Andrew Cuomo, former Governor of New York (2011–2021) (Democratic)

State legislators

- Zohran Mamdani, state assemblymember from the 36th district (2021–present) (Democratic)

Local officials

- Eric Adams, mayor of New York City (2022–present) (Democratic)
- Brad Lander, New York City Comptroller (2022–present) (Democratic)
- Mark Levine, Manhattan Borough President (2022–present) (Democratic)
- Lincoln Restler, New York City councilmember from the 33rd district (2022–present) (Democratic)
- Antonio Reynoso, Brooklyn Borough President (2022–present) (Democratic)
- Donovan Richards, Queens Borough President (2020–present) (Democratic)

Organizations

- Citizens Union
- Habitat for Humanity New York City and Westchester County
- League of Women Voters New York City
- New York League of Conservation Voters
- Open New York
- Regional Plan Association

Newspapers

- New York Post
- Pirate Wires
No

U.S. representatives

- Nicole Malliotakis, NY-11 (2021–present) (Republican)

State legislators

- Andrew Lanza, state senator from the 24th district (2007–present) (Republican)
- Jaime Williams, state assemblymember from the 59th district (2016–present) (Democratic)

Local officials

- Adrienne Adams, Speaker of the New York City Council (2022–present) from the 28th district (2017–present) (Democratic)
- Joann Ariola, Minority Leader of the New York City Council (2025–present) from the 32nd district (2022–present) (Republican)
- Diana Ayala, Deputy Speaker of the New York City Council (2022–present) from the 8th district (2018–present) (Democratic)
- David Carr, former Minority Leader of the New York City Council (2025) from the 50th district (2021–present) (Republican)
- Amanda Farías, Majority Leader of the New York City Council (2024–present) from the 18th district (2022–present) (Democratic)
- Robert Holden, New York City councilmember from the 30th district (2018–present) (Democratic)
- Kristy Marmorato, New York City councilmember from the 13th district (2024–present) (Republican)
- Darlene Mealy, New York City councilmember from the 41st district (2006–2017, 2022–present) (Democratic)
- Lynn Schulman, New York City councilmember from the 29th district (2022–present) (Democratic)
- Inna Vernikov, New York City councilmember from the 48th district (2021–present) (Republican)
- Susan Zhuang, New York City councilmember from the 43rd district (2024–present) (Democratic)

Individuals

- Curtis Sliwa, founder of the Guardian Angels (Republican)

Labor unions

- District Council 37
- Hotel and Gaming Trades Council
- NYC District Council of Carpenters
- SEIU 32BJ
- United Federation of Teachers

Organizations

- New York Young Republican Club
Declined to endorse

Local officials

- Chris Banks, New York City councilmember from the 42nd district (2024–present) (Democratic)
- Gale Brewer, New York City councilmember from the 6th district (2002–2013, 2022–present) (Democratic)
- Crystal Hudson, New York City councilmember from the 35th district (2022–present) (Democratic)
- Kevin Riley, New York City councilmember from the 12th district (2021–present) (Democratic)
- Julie Won, New York City councilmember from the 26th district (2022–present) (Democratic)

Labor unions

- Professional Staff Congress

Organizations

- Jews for Racial and Economic Justice

=== Polling ===
Poll source	Date(s) administered	Sample size	Margin of error	Yes	No	Undecided
Zenith Research	October 14–20, 2025	836 (LV)	± 3.4%	67%	19%	14%
Morning Consult	October 16–18, 2025	581 (RV)	± 4.0%	67%	15%	18%
Global Strategy Group (D)	July 28–31, 2025	1,000 (LV)	± 3.1%	63%	22%	15%

=== Results ===
New York City Proposal 3
Choice	Votes	%
For	1,064,325	56.94
Against	804,832	43.06
Total	1,869,157	100.00
Source: New York City Board of Elections

== Proposal 4 ==
Proposal 4 would create an Affordable Housing Appeals Board that could overturn a decision by the New York City Council relating to approval of affordable housing projects.

2025 New York City Proposal 4
- November 4, 2025
- Establish an Affordable Housing Appeals Board with Council, Borough, and Citywide Representation

Results
Choice	Votes	%
Yes	1,085,599	58.45%
No	771,565	41.55%
Total votes	1,857,164	100.00%

Yes
>90%
80-90%
70–80%
60–70%
50–60%
No
>90%
80-90%
70-80%
60–70%
50–60%

=== Endorsements ===
Yes

Statewide officials

- Kathy Hochul, Governor of New York (2021–present) (Democratic)
- Andrew Cuomo, former Governor of New York (2011–2021) (Democratic)

State legislators

- Zohran Mamdani, state assemblymember from the 36th district (2021–present) (Democratic)

Local officials

- Eric Adams, mayor of New York City (2022–present) (Democratic)
- Brad Lander, New York City Comptroller (2022–present) (Democratic)
- Mark Levine, Manhattan Borough President (2022–present) (Democratic)
- Antonio Reynoso, Brooklyn Borough President (2022–present) (Democratic)
- Donovan Richards, Queens Borough President (2020–present) (Democratic)

Organizations

- Citizens Union
- Habitat for Humanity New York City and Westchester County
- Open New York
- Regional Plan Association

Newspapers

- New York Post
- Pirate Wires
No

U.S. representatives

- Nicole Malliotakis, NY-11 (2021–present) (Republican)

State legislators

- Andrew Lanza, state senator from the 24th district (2007–present) (Republican)
- Jaime Williams, state assemblymember from the 59th district (2016–present) (Democratic)

Local officials

- Adrienne Adams, Speaker of the New York City Council (2022–present) from the 28th district (2017–present) (Democratic)
- Joann Ariola, Minority Leader of the New York City Council (2025–present) from the 32nd district (2022–present) (Republican)
- Diana Ayala, Deputy Speaker of the New York City Council (2022–present) from the 8th district (2018–present) (Democratic)
- David Carr, former Minority Leader of the New York City Council (2025) from the 50th district (2021–present) (Republican)
- Amanda Farías, Majority Leader of the New York City Council (2024–present) from the 18th district (2022–present) (Democratic)
- Robert Holden, New York City councilmember from the 30th district (2018–present) (Democratic)
- Kristy Marmorato, New York City councilmember from the 13th district (2024–present) (Republican)
- Darlene Mealy, New York City councilmember from the 41st district (2006–2017, 2022–present) (Democratic)
- Lincoln Restler, New York City councilmember from the 33rd district (2022–present) (Democratic)
- Lynn Schulman, New York City councilmember from the 29th district (2022–present) (Democratic)
- Inna Vernikov, New York City councilmember from the 48th district (2021–present) (Republican)
- Susan Zhuang, New York City councilmember from the 43rd district (2024–present) (Democratic)

Individuals

- Curtis Sliwa, founder of the Guardian Angels (Republican)

Labor unions

- District Council 37
- Hotel and Gaming Trades Council
- NYC District Council of Carpenters
- SEIU 32BJ
- United Federation of Teachers

Organizations

- New York Young Republican Club
Declined to endorse

Local officials

- Chris Banks, New York City councilmember from the 42nd district (2024–present) (Democratic)
- Gale Brewer, New York City councilmember from the 6th district (2002–2013, 2022–present) (Democratic)
- Crystal Hudson, New York City councilmember from the 35th district (2022–present) (Democratic)
- Kevin Riley, New York City councilmember from the 12th district (2021–present) (Democratic)
- Julie Won, New York City councilmember from the 26th district (2022–present) (Democratic)

Labor unions

- Professional Staff Congress

Organizations

- Jews for Racial and Economic Justice
- League of Women Voters New York City

=== Polling ===
Poll source	Date(s) administered	Sample size	Margin of error	Yes	No	Undecided
Zenith Research	October 14–20, 2025	836 (LV)	± 3.4%	72%	16%	12%
Morning Consult	October 16–18, 2025	581 (RV)	± 4.0%	66%	16%	18%
Global Strategy Group (D)	July 28–31, 2025	1,000 (LV)	± 3.1%	63%	26%	11%

=== Results ===
New York City Proposal 4
Choice	Votes	%
For	1,085,599	58.45
Against	771,565	41.55
Total	1,857,164	100.00
Source: New York City Board of Elections

== Proposal 5 ==
Proposal 5 would require the Department of City Planning to create, maintain, and digitize a central city map.

2025 New York City Proposal 5
- November 4, 2025
- Create a Digital City Map to Modernize City Operations

Results
Choice	Votes	%
Yes	1,366,851	73.57%
No	491,006	26.43%
Total votes	1,857,857	100.00%

Yes
>90%
80-90%
70–80%
60–70%
50–60%
No
>90%
80-90%
70-80%
60–70%
50–60%

=== Endorsements ===
Yes

State legislators

- Zohran Mamdani, state assemblymember from the 36th district (2021–present) (Democratic)

Local officials

- Mark Levine, Manhattan Borough President (2022–present) (Democratic)

Organizations

- Citizens Union
- League of Women Voters New York City
- Open New York

Newspapers

- New York Post
- Pirate Wires
No

Local officials

- Vito Fossella, Staten Island Borough President (2022–present) (Republican)
- Robert Holden, New York City councilmember from the 30th district (2018–present) (Democratic)

Labor unions

- District Council 37
- United Federation of Teachers

Organizations

- New York Young Republican Club
Declined to endorse

Labor unions

- Professional Staff Congress

Organizations

- Jews for Racial and Economic Justice

=== Polling ===
Poll source	Date(s) administered	Sample size	Margin of error	Yes	No	Undecided
Zenith Research	October 14–20, 2025	836 (LV)	± 3.4%	66%	20%	14%
Global Strategy Group (D)	July 28–31, 2025	1,000 (LV)	± 3.1%	70%	16%	14%

=== Results ===
New York City Proposal 5
Choice	Votes	%
For	1,366,851	73.57
Against	491,006	26.43
Total	1,857,857	100.00
Source: New York City Board of Elections

== Proposal 6 ==
Proposal 6 would authorize the city to move the local election year to be consistent with United States presidential election years. City elections are currently held on odd-numbered years. If passed, it would also require a state law change to go into effect.

2025 New York City Proposal 6
- November 4, 2025
- Move Local Elections to Presidential Election Years to Increase Voter Participation

Results
Choice	Votes	%
Yes	874,152	47.18%
No	978,611	52.82%
Total votes	1,852,763	100.00%

Yes
>90%
80-90%
70–80%
60–70%
50–60%
No
>90%
80-90%
70-80%
60–70%
50–60%

=== Endorsements ===
Yes

State legislators

- James Skoufis, state senator from the 42nd district (2019–present) (Democratic)

Organizations

- Brennan Center for Justice
- Citizens Union
- League of Women Voters New York City
- New York League of Conservation Voters

Newspapers

- Pirate Wires
No

State legislators

- Zohran Mamdani, state assemblymember from the 36th district (2021–present) (Democratic)
- Diane Savino, former state senator from the 42nd district (2005–2022) (Democratic)

Local officials

- Robert Holden, New York City councilmember from the 30th district (2018–present) (Democratic)

Individuals

- Errol Louis, journalist and television host

Labor unions

- District Council 37
- United Federation of Teachers

Organizations

- New York Young Republican Club

Newspapers

- New York Post
Declined to endorse

Labor unions

- Professional Staff Congress

Organizations

- Jews for Racial and Economic Justice

=== Results ===
New York City Proposal 6
Choice	Votes	%
For	874,152	47.18
Against	978,611	52.82
Total	1,852,763	100.00
Source: New York City Board of Elections

== Notes ==
Partisan clients
