= New York City Council Black, Latino and Asian Caucus =

Caucus within the New York City Council

The Black, Latino and Asian (BLA) Caucus is a caucus of members of the New York City Council. The Caucus's stated purpose is to "make sure issues of particular concern to the New York City's Black, Latino, and Asian communities through the legislative, oversight, and budgetary powers of the City Council." The Caucus submits an annual list of funding priority recommendations to the New York City Council Speaker's office so that the budget will address the needs of organizations serving the Caucus's constituencies.

== Current members ==
Name	District	Party	Elected
Christopher Marte	District 1	Democratic	2021
Shaun Abreu	District 7	Democratic	2021
Elsie Encarnacion	District 8	Democratic	2025
Yusef Salaam	District 9	Democratic	2023
Carmen De La Rosa	District 10	Democratic	2021
Kevin Riley	District 12	Democratic	2020*
Shirley Aldebol	District 13	Democratic	2025
Pierina Sanchez	District 14	Democratic	2021
Oswald Feliz	District 15	Democratic	2021*
Althea Stevens	District 16	Democratic	2021
Justin Sanchez	District 17	Democratic	2025
Amanda Farías	District 18	Democratic	2021
Sandra Ung	District 20	Democratic	2021
Shanel Thomas-Henry	District 21	Democratic	2025
Tiffany Cabán	District 22	Democratic	2021
Linda Lee	District 23	Democratic	2021
Shekar Krishnan	District 25	Democratic	2021
Julie Won	District 26	Democratic	2021
Nantasha Williams	District 27	Democratic	2021
Ty Hankerson	District 28	Democratic	2025
Phil Wong	District 26	Democratic	2025
Selvena Brooks-Powers	District 31	Democratic	2021*
Jennifer Gutiérrez	District 34	Democratic	2021
Crystal Hudson	District 35	Democratic	2021
Chi Ossé	District 36	Democratic	2021
Sandy Nurse	District 37	Democratic	2021
Alexa Avilés	District 38	Democratic	2021
Shahana Hanif	District 39	Democratic	2021
Rita Joseph	District 40	Democratic	2021
Darlene Mealy	District 41	Democratic	2021
Chris Banks	District 42	Democratic	2023
Susan Zhuang	District 43	Democratic	2023
Farah Louis	District 45	Democratic	2019*
Mercedes Narcisse	District 46	Democratic	2021
Kamillah Hanks	District 49	Democratic	2021

== Leadership history ==
Name	Residence	Party	Years in Leadership	Total Years
Robert Jackson	Manhattan	Democratic	2008–2014	6
Maria del Carmen Arroyo	Bronx	Democratic	2008–2010	2
Fernando Cabrera	Bronx	Democratic	2010–2014	4
Andy King	Bronx	Democratic	2014–2016	2
Rosie Mendez	Manhattan	Democratic	2014–2016	2
Robert Cornegy	Brooklyn	Democratic	2016–2018	2
Ritchie Torres	Bronx	Democratic	2016–2018	2
Ydanis Rodriguez	Manhattan	Democratic	2018–2020	2
I. Daneek Miller	Queens	Democratic	2018–2021	4
Adrienne E. Adams	Queens	Democratic	2020–2021	2
