= Edison Tech =

Edison Tech may refer to:

- Edison Tech Center in Schenectady, New York
- Edison Technical School in Rochester, New York
- Seattle Central Community College, formerly known as Edison Technical School
- Thomas A. Edison High School (Queens), formally known as Thomas A. Edison Career and Technical Education High School
