= Museum of Innovation and Science =

miSci (Museum of Innovation and Science)
- Location: 15 Nott Terrace Heights Schenectady, New York, United States 12308
- Coordinates: 42.8118°N 73.9337°W
- Type: Science and technology; Regional
- Directors: Gina C. Gould, Ph.D.

The Museum of Innovation and Science (stylized as miSci, and formerly the Schenectady Museum & Suits-Bueche Planetarium) is a museum and planetarium located in Schenectady, New York. miSci was founded in 1934 and its exhibitions and educational programming focus on Science, Technology, Engineering, Art, and Mathematics (STEAM). As of September 2023, the museum's president is Gina C. Gould, PhD; Vice President of Collections and Exhibitions is Chris Hunter; and Director of Grants and Special Events is Peter Gabak.

Inside of the museum is the Suits-Bueche Planetarium. It contains a GOTO Chronos Star Machine, one of only 16 in the United States, which is capable of displaying 8,500 stars and 24 constellation outlines. The projector can show the sky from any location on Earth 100,000 years in the past or in the future.

Also located at miSci is a Challenger Learning Center (CLC), which opened in 2014.

The archives contain over 1.5 million photographs, making them the seventh largest collection of photographs in the US (not including the federal government). The archives also include 110 radios, 60 televisions, 15,000 patents, 5000 books, and 1000 films. Many of the items relate to the history of Schenectady and General Electric. The archives are open to the public by appointment. Much of the archives came from the Hall of History Foundation (active in the 1970s). The collection of General Electric internal documents and photos were preserved with great effort by GE employees who felt the need to preserve the history of the company and their colleagues. This resource has been valuable to countless national media outlets and other local organizations such as the Schenectady Gazette, the Edison Tech Center, and WMHT (PBS).

The Dudley Observatory, now affiliated with Siena College, was affiliated with the museum from 2015 to 2019.

Gina C. Gould, former director of the Ashokan Center, has served as President since 2017. Previously, William "Mac" Sudduth, PhD, was president and director from 2012 to 2017.
