= Thomas White Jr. =

American politician (1939–2010)

Thomas White, Jr. (August 21, 1939 – August 27, 2010) was a member of the New York City Council from Queens. A Democrat, he represented the 28th Council district, which includes the neighborhoods of Jamaica, South Jamaica, and Richmond Hill.

He co-founded and was the Executive Director of J-CAP, an alcohol and substance abuse residential treatment program in New York State.

White won the Democratic primary vote in November 2009 to seek a new term, following the overturning of term limits at the insistence of New York City's Mayor Michael Bloomberg in a vote by the New York City Council, by a six votes. This small margin of victory has been attributed by some political observers to public anger over the overturning by the City Council of two referendums supporting eight-year term limits. Five other council incumbents, four of whom had voted to overturn term limits, lost their bids for re-election, the largest such number since the 1980s.

Political offices
Preceded by Mary Pinkett	New York City Council, 28th district 1992–2001	Succeeded by Allan Jennings
Preceded by Allan Jennings	New York City Council, 28th district 2006–2010	Succeeded by Ruben Wills
