= George Wexler =

American painter

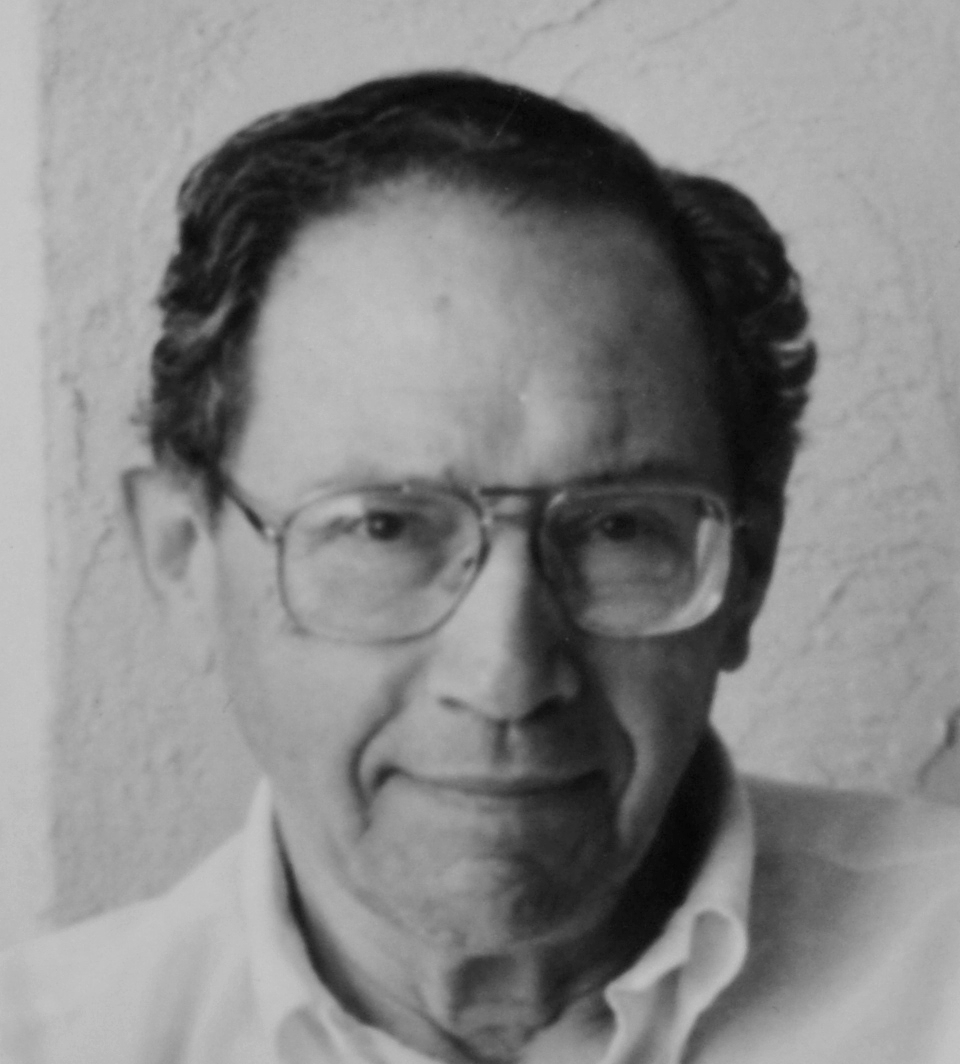
- Born: January 18, 1925; Brooklyn, New York, New York
- Died: June 17, 2006 (aged 81); Siesta Key, Florida
- Education: Cooper Union, NYU, Michigan State University
- Known for: Landscape painting, Art Education
- Movement: Realism, Naturalism

George Wexler (January 18, 1925 – June 17, 2006) was a 20th-century American painter of realist landscapes. His work most frequently depicted scenes of mountains, woodlands, rivers and farmland in the Hudson Valley north of New York City but also included locales in the U.S. west coast and Hawaii. His earliest landscapes were influenced by the French painter Paul Cézanne, but later work became increasingly detailed and naturalistic.

== Biography ==
=== Education ===
Wexler grew up in South Flatbush, Brooklyn, New York, the son of Jewish parents. His father was a printer who immigrated as a young boy fleeing oppression in Ukraine. As a teenager, Wexler studied at the Brooklyn Museum and did a form of New York social realism. Drafted into the army at age 18, he served in World War II as a combat engineer followed by demobilization to England where he trained in stage design at Shrivenham American University. Back in New York he continued his art education at The New School and Cooper Union. Wexler worked in stage design, commercial art and magazine illustration for several years while attending NYU, then went to Michigan State University where from 1950 to 1957 he earned an MFA and was assistant professor of design. In 1957 he was appointed a professor of art at the State University of New York at New Paltz, retiring in 1987.

=== Art ===
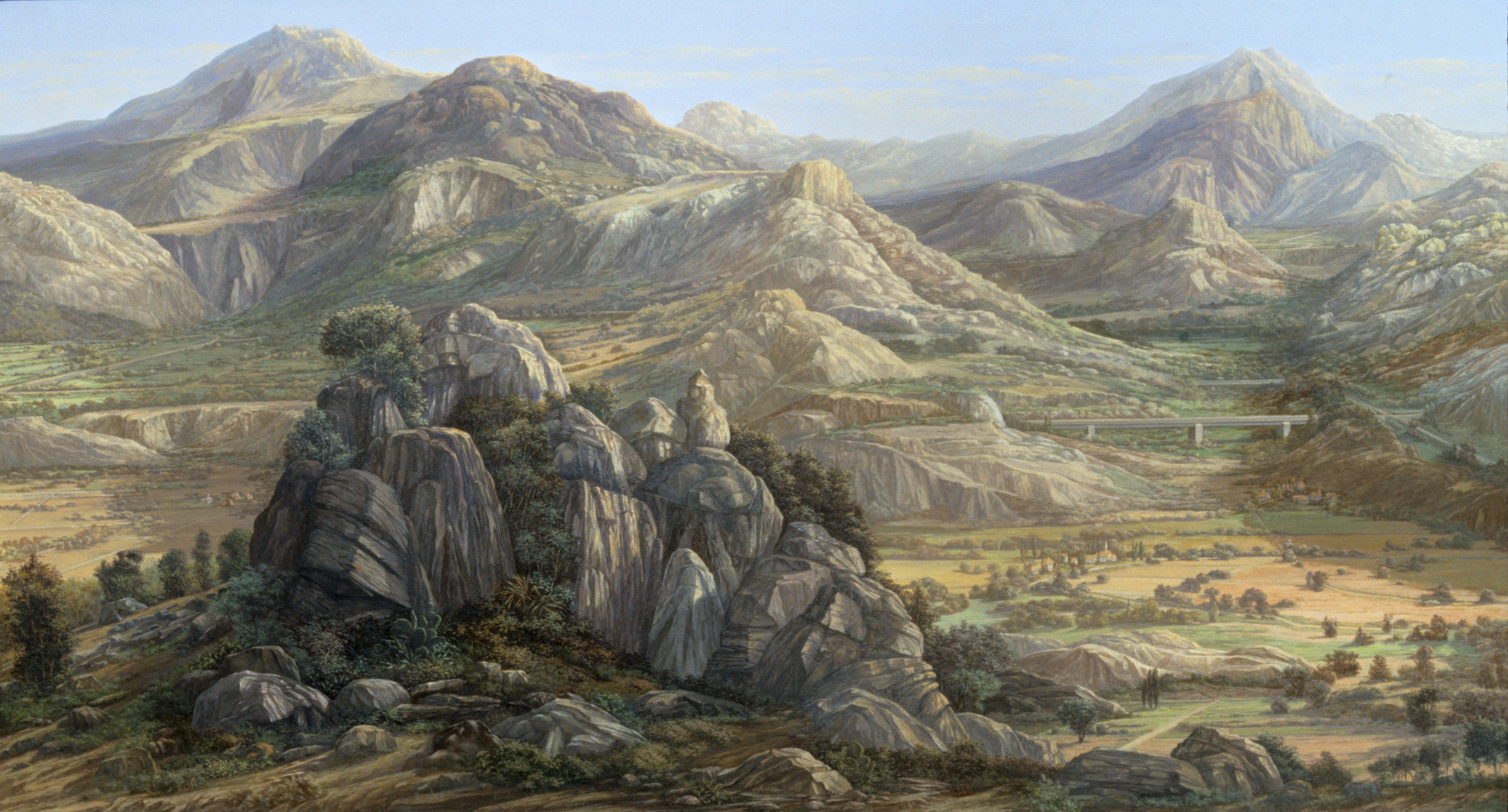
West Coast Landscape 1992

Wexler began his career as a commercial artist, then later an abstract artist. At first interested in Cubism, he worked in abstraction and abstract expressionism for nearly a decade. By the early 1960s he began producing recognizable landscapes noticeably influenced by Cézanne. His later paintings evolved gradually into highly detailed representations of nature characterized by a smooth surface formed from the application of small, "flickering" brush strokes. These later works employed a range of subtle hues, mostly shades of blue and green, to depict the sometimes dramatic contrasts of light and shadow and in some cases an almost surrealist rendering of form in his compositions. Wexler lived with his wife, the artist Thyra Davidson, in New Paltz, New York adjacent to the Shawangunk Ridge and surrounding farmlands which provided much of the inspiration for Wexler's choice of subject matter. Much of his landscape work in this way depicted nature accented by human elements such as buildings, roads, and bridges in various locales in New Paltz and elsewhere in the Hudson Valley. He also painted venues in New England, Nova Scotia, the western U.S. and the Hawaiian Islands. Wexler was initially associated with the First Street Gallery, then subsequently with the Fischbach Gallery in New York City in the 1980s and 1990s.

=== Collections ===
Wexler's works are represented in numerous corporate and private collections as well as the New York State Capitol, the Albany Institute of History and Art (Albany, NY), the Museum of Innovation and Science (Schenectady, NY), the Chrysler Museum of Art (Norfolk, VA), the Samuel Dorsky Museum of Art (New Paltz, NY), and the Haggerty Museum of Art (Milwaukee, WI).
