= Mary Pinkett =

American politician (1926–2003)

Member of the New York City Council from the 35th district
- In office January 1, 1992 – December 31, 2001
- Preceded by: Jerome X. O'Donovan
- Succeeded by: James E. Davis

Member of the New York City Council from the 28th district
- In office January 1, 1974 – December 31, 1991
- Preceded by: None (district created)
- Succeeded by: Thomas White Jr.

Personal details
- Born: September 8, 1926 Brooklyn, New York
- Died: December 4, 2003 (aged 77)
- Cause of death: Heart failure
- Party: Democratic
- Spouse: William Pinkett
- Education: Brooklyn College

Mary Pinkett (née Glover) (September 8, 1926 – December 4, 2003) served in the New York City Council from 1974 to 2001, representing the 28th and 35th districts. She was the first black New York City Councilwoman.

== Early life and career ==
Pinkett grew up in Crown Heights with her sister Loretta. As a young adult, Pinkett attended night classes at Brooklyn College to receive her Bachelor's degree and later moved to Clinton Hill. She worked for the New York City Health and Hospitals Corporation before becoming involved in organized labor. Pinkett would eventually become President of the Social Services Employees Union, Local 371 and Vice President of District Council 37.

== New York City Council ==
After attending the 1972 Democratic National Convention in Miami, Florida, Pinkett ran for New York City Council's newly created 28th District in 1973 and won. She was the first black woman to be elected to the City Council. She would go on to serve in the City Council for 28 years, representing the 28th district for 18 years and the 35th district for 10 years. Due to a new term limit law, Pinkett was unable to run for re-election in 2001 and retired. Her successor, whom she endorsed, was James E. Davis. Davis would later be shot and killed in New York City Hall during his first term.

Pinkett's accomplishments as a councilwoman include leading the passage of a whistleblower law to protect city employees. She was also a strong labor advocate within the City Council, notably obtaining the right for retired city employees to Medicare Part B Pinkett also aided in the development of her Brooklyn district, including in the revitalization of Atlantic Village Housing. She served on many committees throughout her tenure, most notably as chair of the Civil Service and Labor Committee, the Committee on Aging, and the Committee of Governmental Operations.

== Death and legacy ==
On December 4, 2003, Pinkett died due to heart failure brought on by cancer, according to her nephew Derek Glover. Her death was mourned by many New Yorkers, including Mayor Michael Bloomberg

Mary Pinkett Lecture Hall in CUNY Medgar Evers College's Student Support Services Building is named after Pinkett. She was a strong supporter of City University of New York.

In 2013, Washington Avenue in Brooklyn between Eastern Parkway and Lincoln Road was named Mary Pinkett Avenue in her honor by New York City Councilman Mathieu Eugene.

== Electoral history ==
New York City Council District 35, 1997 Democratic Primary
Party	Candidate	Votes	%
Democratic	Mary Pinkett (incumbent)	5,326	52.71
Democratic	Errol T. Louis	2,969	27.82
Democratic	James E. Davis	2,079	19.48
Total votes		10,374	100

New York City Council District 35, 1997 General Election
Party	Candidate	Votes	%
Democratic	Mary Pinkett (incumbent)	11,275	60.36
Conservative	James E. Davis	3,005	
Liberal	James E. Davis	2,013	
Total	James E. Davis	5,018	26.86
Green	Errol T. Louis	1,595	8.54
Republican	David Voyticky	666	3.57
Independence	Luvenia Super	127	0.68
Total votes		18,681	100

Political offices
Preceded by Newly created district	New York City Council, 28th district 1974–1991	Succeeded by Thomas White, Jr.
Preceded by Jerome X. O'Donovan	New York City Council, 35th district 1992–2001	Succeeded by James E. Davis
