= Ruben Wills =

American politician

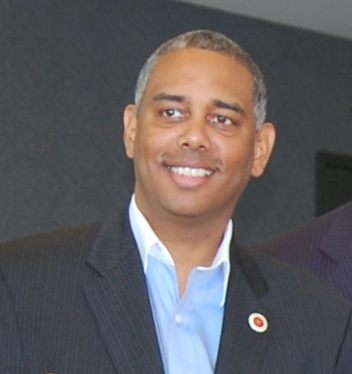

Member of the New York City Council from the 28th district
- In office January 1, 2011 – August 10, 2017
- Preceded by: Thomas White Jr.
- Succeeded by: Adrienne Adams

Personal details
- Born: Ruben W. Mills; August 9, 1971 (age 55)
- Party: Democratic
- Spouse: Marcia Thompson
- Website: Official website

Ruben W. Wills (born August 9, 1971) is a former member of the New York City Council, serving the 28th district from 2011 until he was convicted of a felony in August 2017, which was later overturned. He is a Democrat.

== Life and career ==
Wills is African-American and was born in Southeast Queens. He was raised in the South Jamaica Houses and attended Public School 40 and Thomas Edison High School. He and his wife, Marcia, are members of the St. Albans Congregational Church.

In 2003, Wills served as the special assistant to City Council Member Leroy Comrie, and later he served as chief of staff to State Senator Shirley Huntley. Wills also worked for the SEIU Local 1199 Union. Prior to working in government, Wills made his living operating a contracting company doing renovations for commercial and residential properties.

== New York City Council ==
After losing the 2009 primary to Thomas White, Jr., Wills won the council seat for the 28th district in Southeast Queens the next year, after White died. He then won re-election in 2011 to complete the term, and again for his own full term in 2013. Wills renamed a street in his district in honor of White, thanks to the help of his surviving family.

As a council member, Wills mobilized his community behind several initiatives including removing sex offenders from a new homeless shelter near an elementary school, opposing the establishment of a homeless drop-in center near a high school, organizing a town hall to discuss body cameras on police officers, and stopping a juvenile prison from being constructed in South Ozone Park.

In 2013, Wills went homeless to raise awareness of the plight of homeless individuals in his community. He pumped gas for tips and slept in parks, relying on soup kitchens to stay fed. The weeklong experiment was cut short after Wills reportedly developed pneumonia and was temporarily hospitalized when the experience became hazardous to his health. Wills later cited this experience as his motivation to push Mayor Michael Bloomberg to expand rental subsidies stripped from the city budget in 2011.

In August 2013, Councilman Wills allocated $4.4 million in funding to schools in Queens, making him the largest benefactor for education in the borough in that budget cycle.

== Legal issues ==
In March 2011, Wills responded to two arrest warrants for incidents that occurred over a decade earlier. The first warrant was issued in 1998 for an incident that occurred in 1996. In November 2011, he pleaded guilty to misdemeanor criminal mischief, admitting to stealing items and damaging property in an incident that he called a business dispute. The conviction resulted in no jail time or probation, but Wills had to pay restitution totaling $3,000 and perform 3 days of community service.

The second warrant was for not appearing on a scheduled court date in 2002 for an arrest in Nassau County dating back to 2000. The charge was for operating an unlicensed construction business, also a misdemeanor.

On May 7, 2014, Wills was arrested as part of a corruption investigation. The charges included multiple counts of fraud and grand larceny in connection with more than $30,000 in public funds that went missing from a charity he ran. On February 2, 2015, he was arrested again and charged with five felony counts of failing to disclose financial dealings on five separate disclosure reports filed with the city's Conflicts of Interest Board between 2012 and 2014.

Wills argued that he was unfairly targeted by New York State Attorney General Eric Schneiderman and called for a special prosecutor in the case. Between his indictment in May 2014 and February 2016, Wills missed nearly half of his City Council meetings and hearings.

On July 20, 2017, a jury found Wills guilty on five of the six counts in his corruption trial. He subsequently appealed his conviction. He was sentenced to two to six years in prison, fined $5,000, and ordered to make restitution of $32,874. Wills appealed the conviction and maintained his innocence. On August 12, 2019, Wills was released on parole.

On September 16, 2020, the New York Supreme Court Appellate Division, Second Department, reversed the convictions and ordered a new trial, ruling witnesses were unfairly blocked from testifying. On April 22, 2021, the prosecution dismissed the charges.

== Electoral history ==
Election history
Location	Year	Election	Results
NYC Council District 28	2009	Democratic Primary	√ Thomas White, Jr. 32.14% Lynn Nunes 32.07% Allan Jennings 16.23% Ruben Wills 9.01% Robert A. Hogan 6.0% Stephen S. Jones 4.56%
NYC Council District 28	2009	General	√ Thomas White, Jr. (D) 88.71% Ruben Wills (Conservative) 11.26%
NYC Council District 28	2010	Special	√ Ruben Wills 35.69% Nicole Paultre Bell 29.16% Allan Jennings 11.30% Albert Baldeo 9.73% Charles A. Bilal 8.34% Harpreet Singh Toor 3.64% Martha Taylor Butler 2.15%
NYC Council District 28	2011	Democratic Primary	√ Ruben Wills 67.97% Allan Jennings 17.32% Michael Duvalle 9.70% Clifton Stanley Diaz 5.01%
NYC Council District 28	2011	General	√ Ruben Wills (D) 92.43%
NYC Council District 28	2013	Democratic Primary	√ Ruben Wills 48.90% Hettie V. Powell 32.97% Eugene Walter Evans 10.37% David Kayode 7.77%
NYC Council District 28	2013	General	√ Ruben Wills (D) 95.23; Mireille Leroy (Unity) 4.64%

Political offices
Preceded by Thomas White, Jr.	New York City Council, 28th district 2010–2017	Succeeded by Adrienne Adams
