= Our Time Press =

Brooklyn-based weekly newspaper

- The Local Paper With a Global View
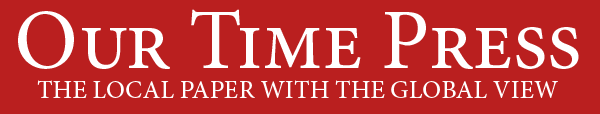
- Type: Weekly newspaper
- Owner(s): DBG Media
- Founder(s): David Mark Greaves and Bernice Elizabeth Green
- Founded: February 1996; 29 years ago
- City: Brooklyn, New York
- Country: United States
- Website: www.ourtimepress.com

Our Time Press is a progressive Brooklyn-based African-American community newspaper. Co-founded by David Mark Greaves and Bernice Elizabeth Green and owned by DBG Media, publishers of Our Time Press, Inc. a privately held company. As of 2016 the newspaper has a circulation of about 20,000 copies.

Greaves described it as "an African-American paper. We speak from an African-American perspective, or at least try to..." The focus is on downtown Brooklyn through Fort Greene, Clinton Hill, Bed-Stuy, Crown Heights, Flatbush, and Brownsville, though the subtitle is, "The Local Paper with the Global View." It is the largest African-American owned and operated newspaper in Brooklyn.

In 2000, the paper was described as "probably one of the most important progressive publications out there," Greaves is the son of the documentary filmmaker William Greaves. Bernice Green is the daughter of community activist Janie Green. Errol Louis used to write a column for the paper. The paper has a sister publication, Our Time at Home created by Green.

== See also ==
- Media of New York City
- African-American newspapers
