= Ty Hankerson =

American politician

Member of the New York City Council from the 28th district
- Incumbent
- Assumed office January 1, 2026
- Preceded by: Adrienne Adams

Personal details
- Born: 1994 (age 31–32) New York City, New York, U.S.
- Party: Democratic

Tyrell D. Hankerson (born 1994) is an American politician serving as a member of the New York City Council from the 28th district. The district includes the Queens neighborhoods of South Jamaica, South Richmond Hill, Rochdale Village, and South Ozone Park. A Democrat, he previously worked as district chief of staff to council speaker Adrienne Adams and was elected to succeed her in 2025 when she was term-limited.

== Early life and career ==
Hankerson was born in South Ozone Park, Queens and raised in South Jamaica. He is a lifelong resident of Queens. Hankerson worked as a pastor of the Justice Ministry at the Excelling Church. He also held several positions at the Southern Queens Parks Association and was a member of the NYPD's Law Enforcement Explorers educational program. Hankerson started working in New York City Councilmember Adrienne Adams' office in 2017 as a scheduler, then became her district chief of staff.

== New York City Council ==
=== 2025 New York City Council campaign ===
Hankerson announced his campaign for the New York City Council's 28th district in the 2025 election, running to succeed term-limited incumbent Adrienne Adams. He garnered endorsements from Adams, Queens Borough President Donovan Richards, the Queens County Democratic Party, District Council 37, 32BJ SEIU, and the Hotel and Gaming Trades Council. In April 2025, Hankerson's campaign objected to signatures filed by former exonerated councilmember Ruben Wills. He defeated four other candidates in the Democratic primary with 58.8% of the vote in the fifth round of ranked choice tabulations. He was unopposed in the general election.

=== Tenure ===
In February 2026, Hankerson worked with the New York City Department of Sanitation to install 36 new trash cans in the district. Hankerson voted for a bill which would require the NYPD to implement security plans for educational facilities facing public safety threats— which was vetoed by mayor Zohran Mamdani due to its broad language and potential impact on right to protest— and "compared the harassment of Jewish students today to the Little Rock, Arkansas, civil rights crisis". At a June 2026 Community Board 12 meeting, he voiced his opposition to the city's plan to build housing on top of the Rochdale Public Library.

As chair of the City Council Parks and Recreation Committee, he criticized Mamdani's administration for cuts to the parks budget in March 2026. Hankerson noted that Mamdani made a campaign promise to allocate 1% of the city's budget for parks, however the proposed budget fell short of this.

== Electoral history ==
=== 2025 ===
2025 New York City Council Democratic primary, District 28
Party	Candidate	Maximum round	Maximum votes	Share in maximum round	Maximum votes First round votes Transfer votes
Democratic	Ty Hankerson	5	6,528	58.8%	
Democratic	Japneet Singh	5	4,583	41.2%	
Democratic	Latoya L. LeGrand	4	2,803	22.6%	
Democratic	Ruben W. Wills	3	2,096	15.5%	
Democratic	Romeo Hitlall	2	1,240	8.8%	
Write-In		1	67	0.5%	

2025 New York City Council election, District 28
Party	Candidate	Votes	%
Democratic	Ty Hankerson	22,258	90.6
Working Families	Ty Hankerson	2,165	8.8
Total	Ty Hankerson	24,423	99.4
Write-in		150	0.6
Total votes		24,573	100.0
Democratic hold			
