= James E. Davis (New York politician) =

American politician (1962–2003)

Member of the New York City Council from the 35th district
- In office January 1, 2002 – July 23, 2003
- Preceded by: Mary Pinkett
- Succeeded by: Letitia James

Personal details
- Born: April 3, 1962 Brooklyn, New York City, U.S.
- Died: July 23, 2003 (aged 41) New York City, U.S.
- Cause of death: Assassination (gunshot wounds)
- Resting place: Cemetery of the Evergreens, Brooklyn
- Party: Democratic
- Education: Pace University (BA)

James E. Davis (April 3, 1962 – July 23, 2003) was an American politician who served on the New York City Council from 2002 until his assassination.

== Early life ==
Davis was born and raised in Brooklyn, the son of a corrections officer and a registered nurse. He was raised with his brother Geoffrey A. Davis. He spent his early childhood in Bedford-Stuyvesant before his family moved to Crown Heights.

He earned a bachelor's degree at Pace University in social science and youth agency administration. He became a corrections officer at Rikers Island after being beaten by two white police officers, and then became a police officer himself in 1991. In 1990, Davis had started an organization called "Love Yourself Stop the Violence" dedicated to stopping violence in urban America. The NYPD soon assigned Davis to the New York City Police Academy as an instructor, and he became a frequent guest on local radio and television programs.

== Political career ==
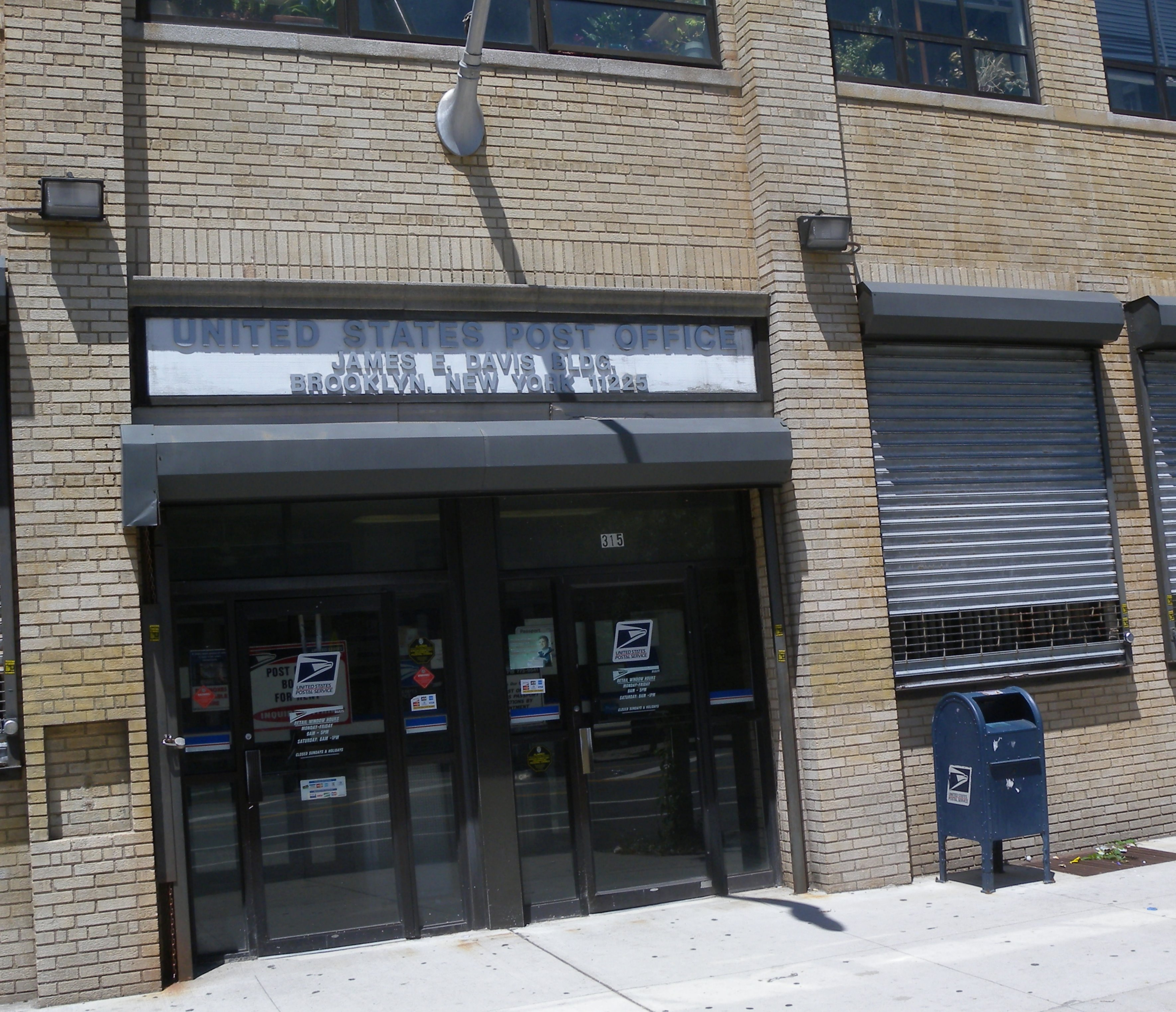
James E. Davis Post Office on Empire Boulevard in Brooklyn

Davis eventually qualified as a minister at Holy Trinity Baptist Church of Brooklyn and became a district leader and then a council member for Brooklyn's 35th Council district in November 2001.

The template for his successful City Council bid had been established by previous races against Assemblyman and Democratic Kings County Chairman Clarence Norman Jr., who narrowly defeated him in 1998. The campaign against the politically powerful Norman—and Davis's high-profile generally—ruffled feathers within the NYPD, and Davis was fired for violating a rule that prohibits paid city employees from engaging in electoral politics. In that November's election, his name was on the ballot on the old Liberal Party of New York line, for which Davis was fired from the NYPD. After pursuing litigation against the police department, Davis's claim that he never formally accepted the Liberal Party nomination was upheld and he was allowed to reclaim his job. He was not, however, permitted to return to his former detail at the police academy, instead being assigned to a night shift at a Brooklyn precinct.

His next campaign in 2001 was successful but would later be a factor in his murder. Othniel Askew had raised funds to run against him, but had failed to file the proper papers on time, which led to accusations of political chicanery and caused Askew to harbor a grudge against Davis.

== Assassination ==
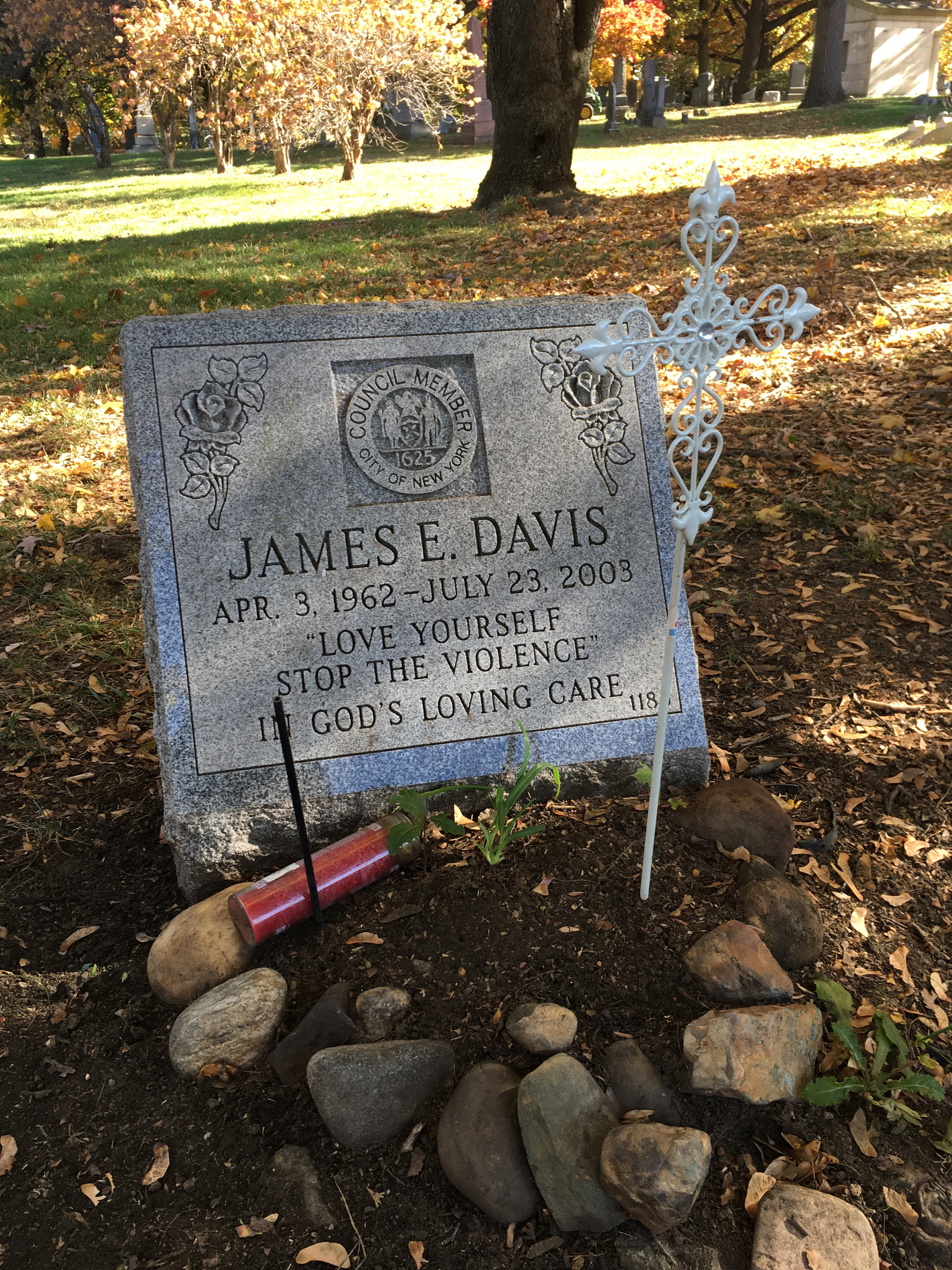
James E. Davis at Evergreens Cemetery

On July 23, 2003, Davis brought Askew to attend a council meeting at the council chambers in New York City Hall, with the intention of honoring him by introducing him from the balcony. The councilman and Askew were able to bypass the metal detectors, a courtesy offered to elected officials and their guests. Once in the balcony, and as the full council and dozens of attendees gathered into the chamber for the meeting, at 2:08 p.m., Askew fired a silver .40 caliber weapon at Davis, striking him several times in the torso. Davis, a retired police officer, was carrying a weapon, but it remained holstered. A plainclothes policeman, Richard Burt, on duty as bodyguard to Gifford Miller, Speaker of the City Council, then fired at Askew from the floor of the chamber, striking Askew five times. Paramedics arrived quickly, and attempted to revive both Davis and Askew before taking them to Beekman Downtown Hospital, where both men died. Askew had a history of violence. It was discovered after the murder that Askew had asked Davis to sign papers naming him as Davis's replacement in case anything happened to Davis.

=== Aftermath ===
Davis would lie in state at New York City Hall, an honor that was not repeated until accorded to Charles Rangel in 2025.

Davis's brother Geoffrey announced that he would run for the seat formerly held by his brother. He was defeated by fellow Democrat Letitia James, running on the Working Families Party line.

== Legacy ==
=== Memorial ===
Davis was buried in Green-Wood Cemetery in Brooklyn. Upon learning his killer's ashes were also in Green-Wood, Davis's family had his body exhumed and reinterred in the Cemetery of the Evergreens.

=== Law & Order episode ===
The murder incident would be used as the basis for "City Hall", an episode of Law & Order which aired on February 11, 2004. However, in the adaptation, the dead councilman was an innocent bystander, with the second victim, a low-level bureaucrat who survived with a shoulder wound, as the true target.

== Electoral history ==
New York City Council District 35, 1997 Democratic Primary
Party	Candidate	Votes	%
Democratic	Mary Pinkett (incumbent)	5,326	52.71
Democratic	Errol T. Louis	2,969	27.82
Democratic	James E. Davis	2,079	19.48
Total votes		10,374	100

New York City Council District 35, 1997 General Election
Party	Candidate	Votes	%
Democratic	Mary Pinkett (incumbent)	11,275	60.36
Conservative	James E. Davis	3,005	
Liberal	James E. Davis	2,013	
Total	James E. Davis	5,018	26.86
Green	Errol T. Louis	1,595	8.54
Republican	David Voyticky	666	3.57
Independence	Luvenia Super	127	0.68
Total votes		18,681	100

2001 New York City Council's 35th District Democratic Primary
Party	Candidate	Votes	%
Democratic	James E. Davis	6,691	37.37%
Democratic	Letitia James	5,746	32.09%
Democratic	Peter Williams	1,823	10.18%
Democratic	Abraham E. Wasserman	1,754	9.80%
Democratic	William J. Saunders	875	4.89%
Democratic	Sidique Wai	556	3.10%
Democratic	Robert A. Hunter	556	3.10%
Total votes		17,907	100%

2001 New York City Council's 35th District General Election
Party	Candidate	Votes	%
Democratic	James E. Davis	13,129	55.64%
Working Families	Letitia James	9,762	41.37%
Independence	Sidique Wai	497	2.11%
Liberal	Sidique Wai	210	0.89%
Total	Sidique Wai	707	3.00%
Total votes		23,598	100%
Democratic hold			

== See also ==
- List of assassinated American politicians

Political offices
Preceded by Mary Pinkett	New York City Council, 35th district 2002–2003	Succeeded by Letitia James
