= Adrienne Adams (politician) =

American politician (born 1960)

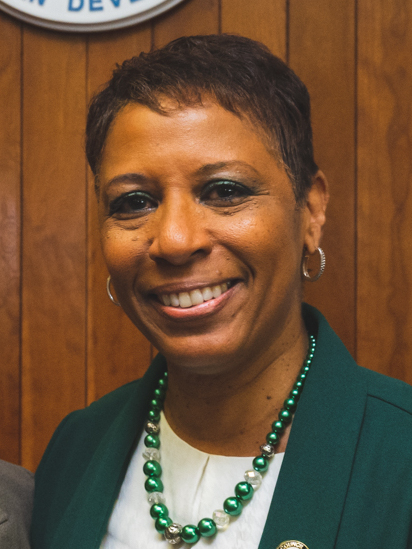
- Adams in 2023

Lieutenant Governor-elect of New York
- Assuming office January 1, 2027
- Governor: Kathy Hochul
- Succeeding: Antonio Delgado

Speaker of the New York City Council
- In office January 5, 2022 – December 31, 2025
- Deputy: Diana Ayala
- Preceded by: Corey Johnson
- Succeeded by: Julie Menin

Member of the New York City Council from the 28th district
- In office November 30, 2017 – December 31, 2025
- Preceded by: Ruben Wills
- Succeeded by: Ty Hankerson

Personal details
- Born: Adrienne Eadie; December 9, 1960 (age 65) New York City, New York, U.S.
- Party: Democratic
- Spouse: Joseph Adams
- Children: 4
- Education: City University of New York, York College (attended); Spelman College (BA)

Adrienne Adams (née Eadie; born December 9, 1960) is an American politician who is the lieutenant governor-elect of New York. A Democrat, Adams represented the 28th district in the New York City Council from 2017 to 2025 and served as speaker of the City Council from 2022 until 2025. She is the first woman to represent District 28 on the City Council and is the first Black person to serve as speaker of the New York City Council.

Adams was first elected to the City Council in 2017. Her district included the Queens borough neighborhoods of Jamaica, Rochdale Village, Richmond Hill and South Ozone Park. She was re-elected to the City Council in 2021. In January 2022, the City Council elected Adams to serve as speaker of the Council; she was unanimously re-elected to that post in 2024. Adams ran for mayor of New York City in 2025, but failed to win the Democratic nomination. She left the City Council at the end of 2025 due to term limits.

In February 2026, Adams was selected by Governor Kathy Hochul to be her running mate in the 2026 New York gubernatorial election. In the general election, they defeated the Republican ticket of Bruce Blakeman and Todd Hood, making Adams the first Black woman elected as lieutenant governor of New York, and making Adams and Hochul the first all-woman gubernatorial ticket elected in New York.

== Early life and education ==
Adrienne Eadie was born on December 9, 1960 at Elmhurst Hospital in Elmhurst, Queens. Both of her parents were union workers. She was raised in Hollis, Queens by a truck driver for UPS and a New York City corrections officer. She attended St. Pascal Baylon Elementary School, Bayside High School (Queens), and York College (CUNY). Adams received a bachelor's degree in psychology from Spelman College.

== Career ==
Before holding elective office, Adams worked professionally in corporate executive training, human capital management, and child care training. From 2012 to 2017, she was a three-term chairperson of Queens Community Board 12. She was appointed to Governor Andrew Cuomo's Local Planning Committee (LPC) for the Jamaica Downtown Revitalization Initiative in 2014, and to the Queens Public Library Board of Trustees in 2015. She was co-chair of the Jamaica Now Leadership Council, established in 2015. In 2016, Adams ran unsuccessfully for New York State Senate against incumbent James Sanders Jr.

=== New York City Council ===
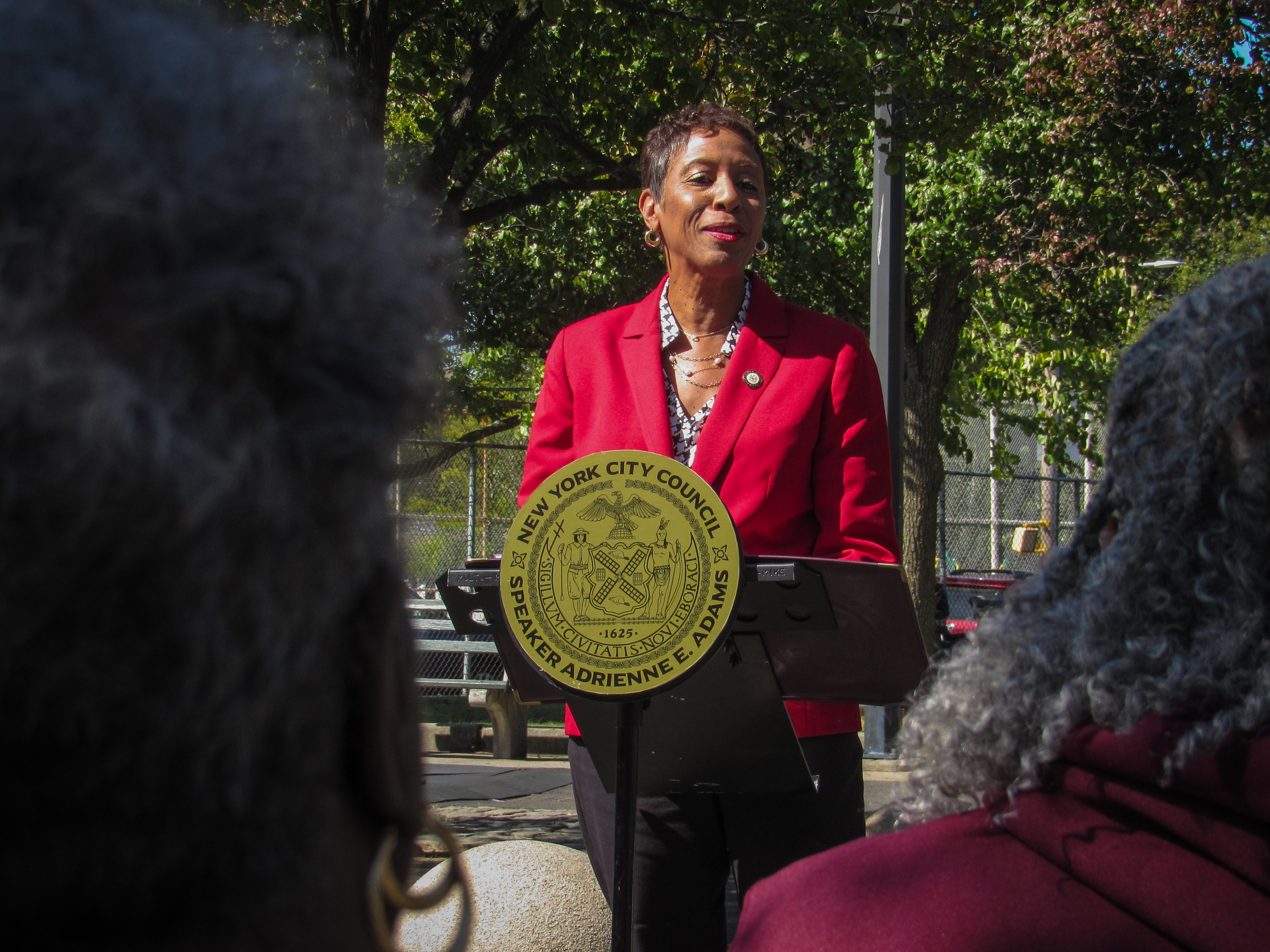
Adrienne Adams delivers remarks at Sutphin Playground (Oct. 3, 2025)

In 2017, Adams ran for New York City Council in District 28. She sought to fill the vacancy caused by the expulsion of her predecessor, Ruben Wills. She won the Democratic primary with 39% of the vote (3,499 votes). Her opponent, Richard David, received 32% of the vote (2,822 votes), and her other opponent, Hettie Powell, received 29% (2,589 votes). Adams went on to win the general election with 86% of the vote. Adams is the first woman to represent District 28 on the City Council. Her district included the neighborhoods of Jamaica, Richmond Hill, Rochdale Village and South Ozone Park in the borough of Queens. During her first term, she was elected by her colleagues as co-chair of the Black, Latino and Asian Caucus. At various points she also served as chair of the Subcommittee on Landmarks, Public Sitings, and Dispositions, and later chair of the Committee on Public Safety. Adams was re-elected in 2021.

In January 2022, the City Council elected Adams to serve as speaker. She is the first Black person to serve as speaker of the City Council. Her election was a political defeat for newly elected mayor Eric Adams, a centrist Democrat and high-school classmate of no relation who had privately been trying to win support for rival Speaker candidate Francisco Moya. Adams was unanimously re-elected as speaker in 2024.

The administration sought to force retirees into Medicare Advantage, stripping them of traditional Medicare with Medigap supplemental coverage that was promised to retirees for almost 60 years. The change was described by the administration as a "budget-cutting conversion" first proposed by Mayor Bill De Blasio and the Municipal Labor Committee in 2021 but has been found by multiple state courts to diminish healthcare and limit access to prescribed care as well as doctors and hospitals. This planned move pit active workers against retirees by their former unions. As revealed by Comptroller Brad Lander in an audit of the Health Insurance Stabilization Fund, the Municipal Labor Committee (MLC) and Mayors misused the fund and sought to force retirees into Medicare Advantage to create a cash flow into the now insolvent fund. The MLC admits in the documents that they did this for money knowing it was not going to solve the problem. Court challenges were still ongoing as of January 2025.

Adams held a January 9, 2023 hearing with retirees which lasted over 10 hours. During the hearing, Marianne Pizzitola, testified that the stabilization fund had been misused and reminded the Council retirees that they are not in unions, and should not have been forced off the Federal Public Health Benefit of Medicare; one of the greatest civil rights achievements. The Independent Budget Office testified repeatedly that the move was not a savings to the City. In 2023, Council Member Charles Barron introduced a two sentence bill that required the City to provide a supplemental plan for retirees' Medicare like it had since 1967, and Speaker Adams refused to allow it to have a hearing. In 2024, Council Member Christopher Marte introduced 1096 that protected retirees' vested Medicare benefits and still ran into resistance, even though Medicare Advantage is the default plan in Project 2025.

In December 2024, Adams and 30 other Council members approved a modified version of Mayor Adams's zoning reform proposal known as "City of Yes for Housing Opportunity". The mayor subsequently signed the bill, which authorized the construction and conversion of approximately 80,000 additional housing units in New York City over the next 15 years. Nevertheless, Speaker Adams and Mayor Adams have increasingly diverged on issues facing the city, especially regarding budget priorities, criminal justice policies, and commissioner appointments. In February 2025, after four deputy mayors resigned in the wake of criminal corruption charges against Mayor Adams, the speaker joined many other New York officials calling for his resignation or removal.

In 2025, Adams sought to prevent pro-housing ballot initiatives from being put to voters. After being unsuccessful at blocking the ballot initiatives, she spent 2 million of taxpayer money on mail that encouraged voters to vote against the pro-housing measures. Adams argued that the measures, which speed up the review process for affordable housing developments and limit the ability of NIMBYs to block housing, would lead to "more gentrification" and "less affordability," and "There will be no more negotiation with our residents, with our neighbors, with our community boards, with our civic associations that we partner with. That will be gone."

That same year, Adams resisted calling a vote on legislation that had majority support in the New York City Council which would prohibit cars from parking within 20 feet of intersections as a safety measure to improve visibility and enhance pedestrian safety.

Due to term limits, Adams was ineligible to seek re-election to the City Council in 2025. Adams's district chief of staff, Ty Hankerson, was elected to replace her as the councilmember for District 28.

=== 2025 New York City mayoral campaign ===
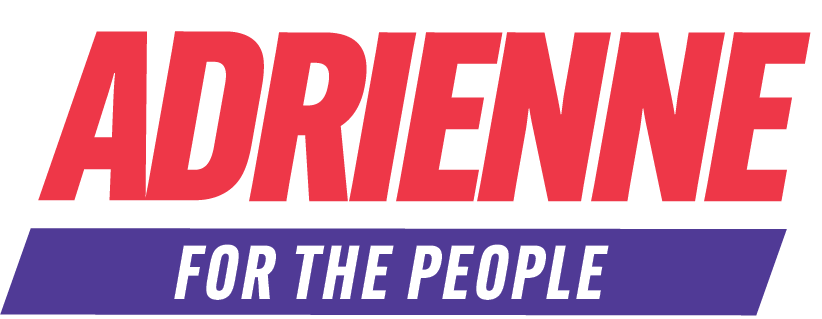
Adams's 2025 mayoral campaign logo

Map of Adams's vote share in the first round of the Democratic primary by precinct and borough

In March 2025, term-limited Speaker Adams became the ninth Democratic candidate to challenge incumbent Mayor Eric Adams in the 2025 NYC mayoral election. She declared her candidacy at the urging of many New York elected officials, most notably New York State Attorney General Letitia James and New York City Public Advocate Jumaane Williams. Adams was a late entrant into the race, announcing her candidacy less than four months prior to the Democratic primary. She received endorsements from District Council 37, CWA Local 1180, and UNITE HERE Local 100. Adams finished in fourth place in the Democratic primary, receiving 4.1% of the vote.

=== 2026 campaign for lieutenant governor of New York ===
On February 4, 2026, New York Governor Kathy Hochul announced Adams as her nominee for lieutenant governor in the 2026 New York gubernatorial election. Both political moderates, Hochul and Adams formed the first all-female major party gubernatorial ticket in New York State history. In the general election, they defeated the Republican ticket of Bruce Blakeman and Todd Hood, making Adams the first Black woman elected as lieutenant governor of New York, and making Adams and Hochul the first all-woman gubernatorial ticket elected in New York.

== Electoral history ==
2025 New York City Democratic mayoral primary
Candidate	Round 1		Round 2		Round 3	
Candidate	Votes	%	Votes	%	Votes	%
Zohran Mamdani	469,642	43.82%	469,755	43.86%	573,169	56.39%
Andrew Cuomo	387,137	36.12%	387,377	36.17%	443,229	43.61%
Brad Lander	120,634	11.26%	120,707	11.27%	Eliminated	
Adrienne Adams	44,192	4.12%	44,359	4.14%	Eliminated	
Scott Stringer	17,820	1.66%	17,894	1.67%	Eliminated	
Zellnor Myrie	10,593	0.99%	10,648	0.99%	Eliminated	
Whitney Tilson	8,443	0.79%	8,525	0.80%	Eliminated	
Michael Blake	4,366	0.41%	4,389	0.41%	Eliminated	
Jessica Ramos	4,273	0.40%	4,294	0.40%	Eliminated	
Paperboy Prince	1,560	0.15%	1,628	0.15%	Eliminated	
Selma Bartholomew	1,489	0.14%	1,505	0.14%	Eliminated	
Write-ins	1,581	0.15%	Eliminated			
Active votes	1,071,730	100.00%	1,071,081	99.94%	1,016,398	94.84%
Exhausted ballots	—N/a		649	0.06%	55,332	5.16%
Source: New York City Board of Elections

== Personal life ==
Adams is a longtime member of the Greater Allen A.M.E. Cathedral of New York, the NAACP, and the National Action Network. She is also an active member of the Alpha Kappa Alpha sorority. Her blended family includes her husband Joseph J. Adams, four adult children, and eleven grandchildren (as of July 2023).

Political offices
Preceded by Corey Johnson	Speaker of the New York City Council; 2022–2025	Succeeded by Julie Menin
Preceded by Antonio Delgado	Lieutenant Governor of New York; Taking office 2027	Elect
Party political offices
Preceded by Antonio Delgado	Democratic nominee for Lieutenant Governor of New York; 2026	Most recent
