= Jerome X. O'Donovan =

American politician (1944–2014)

Member of the New York City Council from the 49th district
- In office January 1, 1992 – December 31, 2001
- Preceded by: None (district created)
- Succeeded by: Michael E. McMahon

Member of the New York City Council from the 35th district
- In office January 1, 1983 – December 31, 1991
- Preceded by: None (district created)
- Succeeded by: Mary Pinkett

Personal details
- Born: August 31, 1944 Staten Island, New York, U.S.
- Died: December 11, 2014 (aged 70) Staten Island, New York, U.S.
- Party: Democratic
- Spouse: Vita Cannavo
- Education: Marshall University (B.A.); University of Oklahoma (J.D.)

Military service
- Allegiance: United States of America
- Branch/service: United States Marine Corps
- Rank: Captain
- Battles/wars: Vietnam War

Jerome Xavier "Jay" O'Donovan (August 31, 1944 – December 11, 2014) was a former Democratic Party politician from the New York City borough of Staten Island who served in the New York City Council representing the North Shore of that borough. On December 11, 2014, O'Donovan died at his home in the Dongan Hills neighborhood on Staten Island.

== Vietnam veteran ==
O'Donovan was the first Vietnam War veteran elected to the New York City Council. A United States Marine Corps captain and advisor to the South Vietnam Marines, he was awarded two Bronze Stars and the Vietnam Cross of Gallantry with Silver Star.

Political offices
Preceded by Newly created district	New York City Council, 35th district 1983–1991	Succeeded by Mary Pinkett
Preceded by Newly created district	New York City Council, 49th district 1992–2001	Succeeded by Michael E. McMahon
