= Allan Jennings =

Australian rules footballer

Personal information
- Full name: Allan Jennings
- Born: 23 March 1959 (age 67)
- Original team: Traralgon
- Height: 180 cm (5 ft 11 in)
- Weight: 75 kg (165 lb)
- Position: Half forward

Playing career^{1}
Years	Club	Games (Goals)
1982	Footscray	9 (15)
- ^{1} Playing statistics correct to the end of 1982.

Allan Jennings (born 23 March 1959) is a former Australian rules footballer who played for the Footscray Football Club in the Victorian Football League (VFL).
