= New York City's 35th City Council district =

- Boundaries following the 2020 census

Government
  - Councilmember: . Crystal Hudson. D–Prospect Heights

Population (2023)
  - Total: 171,534

Demographics
  - White: 38%
  - Black: 35%
  - Hispanic: 14%
  - Asian: 7%
  - Other: 7%

Registration
  - Democratic: 79%
  - Republican: 4%
  - No party preference: 15%
- Registered voters (2023) 120,575

New York City's 35th City Council district is one of 51 districts in the New York City Council. It is currently represented by Democrat Crystal Hudson, who took office in 2022. Among the seat's prior occupants include Mary Pinkett, the first Black woman to be elected to the council, and current Attorney General Letitia James.

== Geography ==
District 35 covers a series of Brooklyn neighborhoods to the north and east of Prospect Park, including Prospect Heights, Clinton Hill, Fort Greene, and parts of Bedford–Stuyvesant and Crown Heights. A small section of Prospect Park proper is also located within the district.

The district overlaps with Brooklyn Community Boards 2, 3, 6, 8, and 9, and with New York's 7th, 8th, and 9th congressional districts. It also overlaps with the 20th, 21st, 25th, and 26th districts of the New York State Senate, and with the 43rd, 50th, 52nd, 56th, and 57th districts of the New York State Assembly.

== Members representing the district ==
| Members | Party | Years served | Electoral history |
|---|---|---|---|
District established January 1, 1983
| Jerome X. O'Donovan (Dongan Hills) | Democratic | January 1, 1983 – December 31, 1991 | Elected in 1982. Re-elected in 1985. Re-elected in 1989. Redistricted to the 49th district. |
| Mary Pinkett (Crown Heights) | Democratic | January 1, 1992 – December 31, 2001 | Redistricted from the 28th district and re-elected in 1991. Re-elected in 1993. Re-elected in 1997. Termed out. |
| James E. Davis (Crown Heights) | Democratic | January 1, 2002 – July 23, 2003 | Elected in 2001. Renominated, then assassinated. |
| Vacant | | July 23, 2003 – January 1, 2004 | |
| Letitia James (Clinton Hill) | Working; Families | January 1, 2004 – December 31, 2013 | Elected in 2003. Switched parties and re-elected in 2005. Re-elected in 2009. Termed out and ran for New York City Public Advocate. |
| Letitia James (Clinton Hill) | Democratic | January 1, 2004 – December 31, 2013 | Elected in 2003. Switched parties and re-elected in 2005. Re-elected in 2009. Termed out and ran for New York City Public Advocate. |
| Laurie Cumbo (Crown Heights) | Democratic | January 1, 2014 – December 31, 2021 | Elected in 2013. Re-elected in 2017. Termed out. |
| Crystal Hudson (Prospect Heights) | Democratic | January 1, 2022 – | Elected in 2021. Re-elected in 2023. Re-elected in 2025. |

== Recent election results ==
=== 2025 ===
The 2025 New York City Council elections will be held on November 4, 2025, with primary elections occurring on June 24, 2025.

2025 New York City Council election, District 35
Primary election
| Party | Candidate | Votes | % |
|---|---|---|---|
| Democratic | Crystal Hudson (incumbent) | 34,286 | 84.6 |
| Democratic | Dion Ashman | 3,214 | 7.9 |
| Democratic | Hector Robertson | 1,881 | 4.6 |
| Democratic | Kenny Lever | 913 | 2.3 |
| Write-in | | 225 | 0.6 |
| Total votes | | 40,519 | 100.0 |
General election
| Democratic | Crystal Hudson | 42,212 | |
| Working Families | Crystal Hudson | 15,482 | |
| Total | Crystal Hudson (incumbent) | 57,694 | 92.1 |
| Conservative | Benny Rosenberger | 3,352 | 5.4 |
| United Alliance | Hector Robertson | 1,033 | 1.7 |
| Write-in | | 530 | 0.8 |
| Total votes | | 62,609 | 100.0 |
| Democratic hold | | | |

=== 2023 (redistricting) ===
Due to redistricting and the 2020 changes to the New York City Charter, councilmembers elected during the 2021 and 2023 City Council elections will serve two-year terms, with full four-year terms resuming after the 2025 New York City Council elections.

2023 New York City Council election, District 35
| Party | Candidate | Votes | % |
|---|---|---|---|
| Democratic | Crystal Hudson | 10,094 | |
| Working Families | Crystal Hudson | 3,842 | |
| Total | Crystal Hudson (incumbent) | 13,936 | 97.3 |
| Write-in | | 377 | 2.7 |
| Total votes | | 14,313 | 100.0 |
| Democratic hold | | | |

=== 2021 ===
In 2019, voters in New York City approved Ballot Question 1, which implemented ranked-choice voting in all local elections. Under the new system, voters have the option to rank up to five candidates for every local office. Voters whose first-choice candidates fare poorly will have their votes redistributed to other candidates in their ranking until one candidate surpasses the 50 percent threshold. If one candidate surpasses 50 percent in first-choice votes, then ranked-choice tabulations will not occur.

2021 New York City Council election, District 35 Democratic primary
| Party | Candidate | Maximum round | Maximum votes | Share in maximum round | Maximum votes First round votes Transfer votes |
|---|---|---|---|---|---|
| Democratic | Crystal Hudson | 3 | 16,564 | 54.0% | |
| Democratic | Michael Hollingsworth | 3 | 14,138 | 46.0% | |
| Democratic | Renee Collymore | 2 | 4,438 | 12.7% | |
| Democratic | Curtis Harris | 2 | 1,652 | 4.7% | |
| Democratic | Regina Kinsey | 2 | 1,637 | 4.7% | |
| Democratic | Deirdre Levy | 2 | 1,398 | 4.0% | |
| Democratic | Hector Robertson | 2 | 504 | 1.4% | |
| Write-in | | 1 | 68 | 0.2% | |

An interactive map of District 35

2021 New York City Council election, District 35 general election
| Party | Candidate | Votes | % |
|---|---|---|---|
| Democratic | Crystal Hudson | 29,003 | 94.7 |
| Common Sense | Regina Kinsey | 1,475 | 4.8 |
| Write-in | | 160 | 0.5 |
| Total votes | | 30,638 | 100 |
| Democratic hold | | | |

=== 2017 ===
2017 New York City Council election, District 35
Primary election
| Party | Candidate | Votes | % |
|---|---|---|---|
| Democratic | Laurie Cumbo (incumbent) | 10,421 | 57.4 |
| Democratic | Ede Fox | 7,549 | 41.6 |
| Democratic | Jabari Brisport (write-in) | 113 | 0.6 |
| Write-in | | 63 | 0.4 |
| Total votes | | 18,146 | 100 |
| Green | Jabari Brisport | 32 | 88.9 |
| Green | Scott Hutchins | 4 | 11.1 |
| Write-in | | 0 | 0.0 |
| Total votes | | 36 | 100 |
General election
| Democratic | Laurie Cumbo (incumbent) | 21,695 | 67.2 |
| Green | Jabari Brisport | 8,117 | |
| Socialist | Jabari Brisport | 1,190 | |
| Total | Jabari Brisport | 9,307 | 28.8 |
| Republican | Christine Parker | 1,203 | 3.7 |
| Write-in | | 57 | 0.3 |
| Total votes | | 32,262 | 100 |
| Democratic hold | | | |

=== 2013 ===
2013 New York City Council election, District 35
Primary election
| Party | Candidate | Votes | % |
|---|---|---|---|
| Democratic | Laurie Cumbo | 7,561 | 36.2 |
| Democratic | Olanike Alabi | 5,369 | 25.7 |
| Democratic | Ede Fox | 5,340 | 25.6 |
| Democratic | Jelani Mashariki | 1,341 | 6.4 |
| Democratic | F. Richard Hurley | 1,245 | 6.0 |
| Write-in | | 3 | 0.0 |
| Total votes | | 20,859 | 100 |
General election
| Democratic | Laurie Cumbo | 23,164 | |
| Working Families | Laurie Cumbo | 3,321 | |
| Total | Laurie Cumbo | 26,485 | 99.7 |
| Write-in | | 80 | 0.3 |
| Total votes | | 26,565 | 100 |
| Democratic hold | | | |
