= WMHT =

WMHT can refer to the following broadcasting stations in the Albany, New York area:

- WMHT (TV), UHF channel 17
- WMHT-FM, 89.1 MHz
