= Thomas A. Edison High School (Queens) =

Public school in New York City

Coordinates: 40°42′57″N 73°47′57″W

Thomas A. Edison Career and Technical Education High School

Location
- 165-65 84th Avenue, Jamaica, New York 11432

Information
- Type: Public high school secondary school
- Motto: "The Thomas Edison community helps its students to grow into better people by providing the building blocks of life."
- Established: 1950; 76 years ago
- School board: New York City Public Schools
- School district: 28
- School number: Q620
- CEEB code: 332585
- Principal: Moses A. Ojeda
- Grades: 9–12
- Gender: Co-Educational
- Enrollment: 2,196 (2018–2019)
- Campus type: Urban
- Colors: Blue and Gold
- Athletics conference: Public Schools Athletic League
- Mascot: Lightbulb
- Nickname: Edison (Ed)
- Newspaper: The Edison Light
- Website: www.taehs.org

Thomas A. Edison Career and Technical Education High School (often referred to locally simply as Edison) is a four-year public secondary school in Queens's Jamaica Hills community in New York City. It is one of the few public high schools in New York City to offer vocational training programs as well as traditional college preparatory tracks and is well known for its largely male population. The school is operated by the New York City Department of Education.

== Location ==
The campus is located near the top of a fairly steep hill at the corner of 168th Street and 84th Avenue, and sits on the south side of the Grand Central Parkway; St. John's University is situated diagonally across the parkway to the northeast. Hillside Avenue, at the foot of the hill, is several blocks to the south.

Jamaica High School is separated from Edison by 84th Avenue and the Jamaica High School Track and Football Field. These schools do not share any affiliation with each other. Hillcrest High School, another nearby high school, is located at Highland Avenue and Parsons Boulevard.

The city block the school occupies is host to the annual 3100 Mile Self-Transcendence Race.

== Academic programs ==
Students at Edison generally take required courses in health, music theory, and art appreciation during their freshman year, at the end of which they choose a track to pursue in grades 10–12. Edison offers college-preparatory technological programs such as mechanical and electronic technologies as well as more trade-oriented programs such as medical assisting, automotive and computer repair (A+ Certification), mechanical engineering / AutoCAD, C++ programming, computer graphics design, and the Cisco Networking Academy, in which one can earn a CCNA network certification upon completion of the program. In information technology, students take Electronics and Cabling for one term. After they pass both classes, they have a choice of major (i.e., A+ Repair, Cisco, MOS) for junior and senior year.

=== Career and technical education courses ===
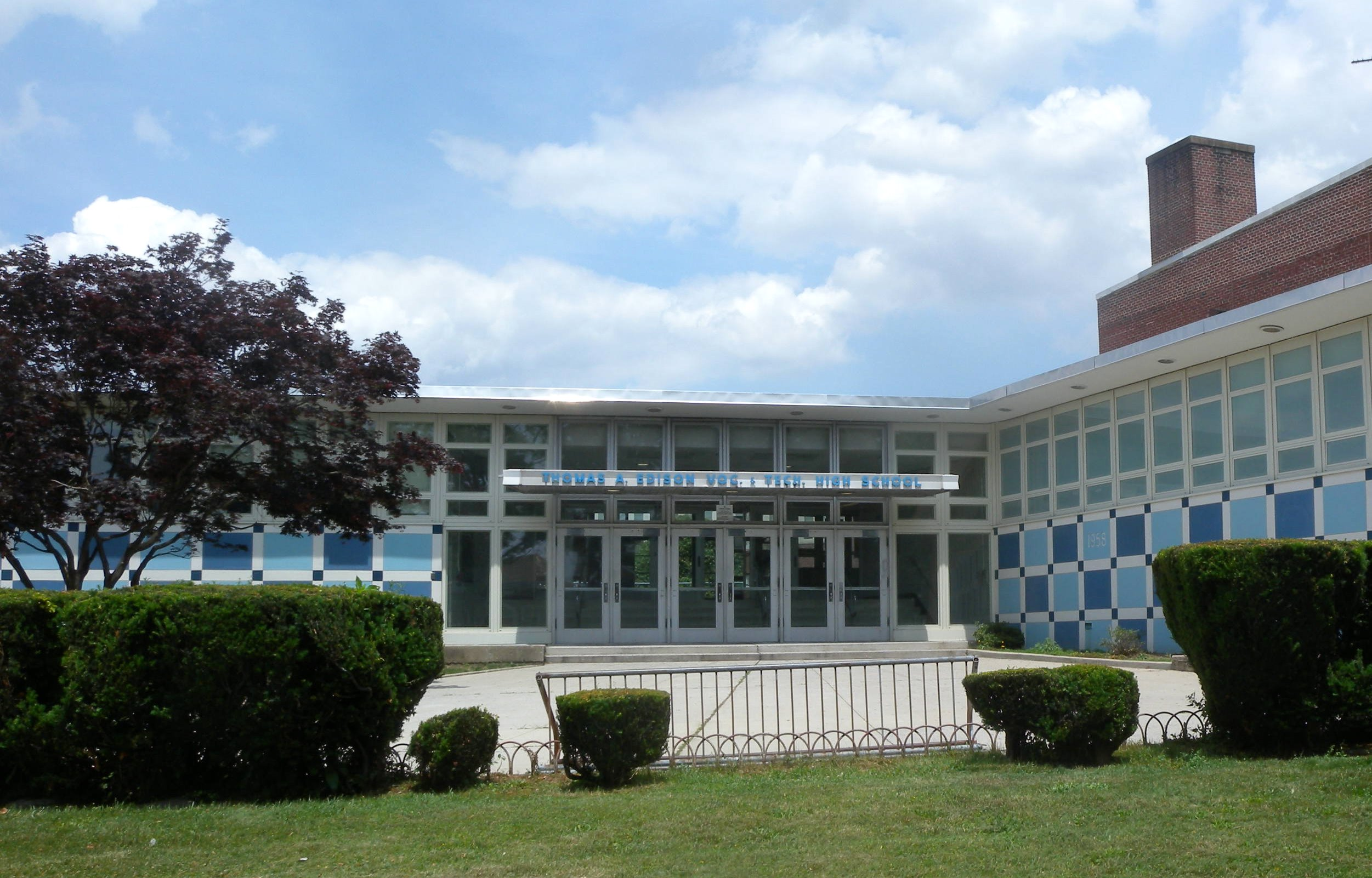
Thomas Edison High School, viewed from 84th Avenue

- Collision Repair and Refinishing
- Registered nursing
- Medical Assisting
- Technical Electronics Engineering/ Robotics
- CAD / Mechanical Engineering
- Cisco Networking
- Computer Repair (A+ Certification Specialists)
- Commercial Art
- Automotive Technologies
- Electrical Installation Technologies
- Web Design
- Graphic Art Communications

== Demographics ==
During the 2018–2019 school year, the school had an enrollment of 2,196 students. Of Edison's students, 48% are Asian, 23% are Hispanic or Latino, 18% are black, 4% are white, and 5% are Native American. Of Edison's students, 65% are male, and 35% are female.

In the fall of 2006, Edison admitted 873 freshmen (9th graders). The total student population is approximately 250 larger than the 2005–2006 school year. The increase in student population has required the hiring of more than 20 new teachers. Crowding is an issue in a building designed for 1,600 students.

When Edison first opened in 1950 as an all-boys school, there were 700 students. Girls were first admitted in the late 1970s.

== Student activities ==
Edison participates in a wide variety of citywide sporting activities as the Edison Inventors in the Public School Athletic League.

== Notable alumni ==
- Allen Coage – Olympic bronze medal-winning judoka and professional wrestler
- Stephen A. Smith – ESPN sports personality and Philadelphia Inquirer sports columnist is a member of the graduating class of 1986.
- Ruben Wills – former member of the New York City Council, serving the 28th district from 2011 until he was convicted of a felony in August 2017.
- Mike Windischmann – professional soccer player
