= Errol Louis =

American journalist (born 1962)

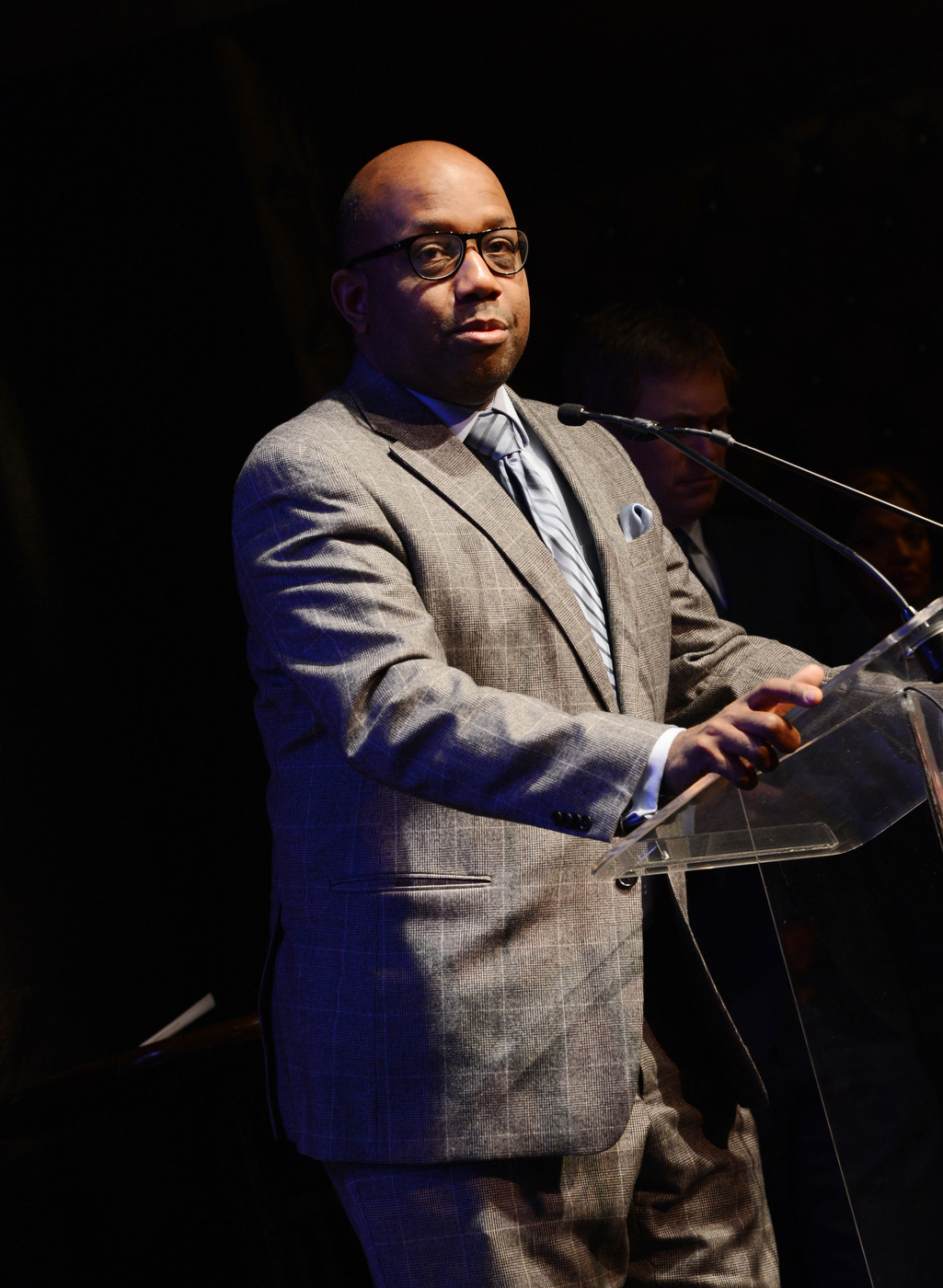
- Born: August 24, 1962 (age 64); New York City, U.S.
- Education: Harvard University (BA); Yale University (MA); Brooklyn Law School (JD)
- Occupation: Journalist

Errol T. Louis (born August 24, 1962) is an American journalist and television show host active in New York City.

== Early life ==
Louis, who is of African American heritage, was born in Harlem and raised in New Rochelle, New York, by his father, Edward J. Louis, a retired officer in the New York City Police Department, and his mother, Tomi (née Hawkins) Louis, a bookkeeper. He received a B.A. in government from Harvard, an M.A. in political science from Yale, and a J.D. from Brooklyn Law School. He was raised Catholic.

== Career ==
=== Finance and teaching ===
Louis co-founded the Central Brooklyn Federal Credit Union with Mark Winston Griffith in the spring of 1993. The two were known as "the hip-hop bankers".

Louis taught urban studies at Pratt Institute.

=== Politics ===
On September 9, 1997, Louis ran in the Democratic primary for New York City Council District 35 against incumbent Mary Pinkett and police officer James E. Davis. Louis had charged Pinkett with being absent in the community, and he was endorsed by Congressman Major Owens, State Senator Velmanette Montgomery, and Assemblyman Roger L. Green.

Louis lost to Pinkett with 27.82% of the vote, but then ran against Pinkett again in the November 4, 1997, general election on the Green Party line, with Davis on the Conservative Party and Liberal Party lines. Louis was defeated with 8.54% of the vote.

Louis declared his candidacy in the 2001 Democratic primary for the same City Council seat, but he had dropped out of the race by August 2001.

=== Journalism ===
Louis was an associate editor of The New York Sun. He later joined the New York Daily News in 2004 and for many years wrote a column, "Commerce and Community", for Our Time Press, which is published weekly and based in the Bedford-Stuyvesant neighborhood of Brooklyn. Louis also served on the editorial board.

On June 23, 2008, Louis became host of the Morning Show, a three-hour talk program on radio station WWRL; in 2009 he was succeeded by Mark Riley. In November 2010 The Village Voice named him the city's best newspaper columnist and radio show host.

Louis joined NY1 in November 2010 as political anchor and the host of Inside City Hall, a program about New York City politics that airs nightly. He is the Director of the Urban Reporting program at the City University of New York's Graduate School of Journalism. He is also a CNN contributor and has made frequent appearances on Lou Dobbs Tonight and other CNN news programs. In 2025, Louis was spoofed by the American late night comedy variety show, Saturday Night Live, as the host of a fictional NY1 debate between Zohran Mamdani, Curtis Sliwa and Andrew Cuomo, candidates for that year's New York City mayoral race. He was played by actor Kenan Thompson.

In 1996 Louis was named by New York Magazine as one of "10 New Yorkers Making a Difference", "with energy, vision and independent thinking."

== Personal life ==
Louis lives in Crown Heights, Brooklyn, with his wife, Juanita Scarlett, a lobbyist with the firm Bolton-St. John's, and their son.

== Electoral history ==
New York City Council District 35, 1997 Democratic Primary
Party	Candidate	Votes	%
Democratic	Mary Pinkett (incumbent)	5,326	52.71
Democratic	Errol T. Louis	2,969	27.82
Democratic	James E. Davis	2,079	19.48
Total votes		10,374	100

New York City Council District 35, 1997 General Election
Party	Candidate	Votes	%
Democratic	Mary Pinkett (incumbent)	11,275	60.36
Conservative	James E. Davis	3,005	
Liberal	James E. Davis	2,013	
Total	James E. Davis	5,018	26.86
Green	Errol T. Louis	1,595	8.54
Republican	David Voyticky	666	3.57
Independence	Luvenia Super	127	0.68
Total votes		18,681	100

== Notes ==
Media offices
Preceded by Dominic Carter	Host of Inside City Hall; October 29, 2010–present	Succeeded by incumbent
