= Letitia James =

American lawyer and politician (born 1958)

- James in 2025

67th Attorney General of New York
- Incumbent
- Assumed office January 1, 2019
- Governor: Andrew Cuomo; Kathy Hochul
- Preceded by: Barbara Underwood

4th New York City Public Advocate
- In office January 1, 2014 – December 31, 2018
- Preceded by: Bill de Blasio
- Succeeded by: Corey Johnson (acting); Jumaane Williams

Member of the New York City Council from the 35th district
- In office January 1, 2004 – December 31, 2013
- Preceded by: James Davis
- Succeeded by: Laurie Cumbo

Personal details
- Born: Letitia Ann James; October 18, 1958 (age 68) New York City, U.S.
- Party: Democratic
- Other political affiliations: Working Families
- Education: Lehman College (BA); Howard University (JD); Columbia University (MPA)
- Website: Office website Campaign website

Letitia Ann "Tish" James (born October 18, 1958) is an American lawyer and politician from the state of New York. She has served since 2019 as the 67th attorney general of New York (NYAG), having been first elected to the post in 2018. A member of the Democratic Party, James is the first Black person to serve as New York attorney general and is the first Black woman to hold statewide office in New York.

Born and raised in Brooklyn, James graduated from Lehman College in the Bronx before obtaining her Juris Doctor degree at Howard University in Washington, D.C. She worked as a public defender, then on staff in the New York State Assembly, and later as a New York State Assistant Attorney General in the Brooklyn regional office. James served as a member of the New York City Council from 2004 to 2013. She represented the 35th district, which includes the Brooklyn neighborhoods of Clinton Hill, Fort Greene, parts of Crown Heights, Prospect Heights, and Bedford–Stuyvesant. James chaired the committees on economic development and sanitation and served on others. From 2013 to 2018, she was the New York City Public Advocate, the first African American woman to be elected to and hold citywide office in New York City.

James' office filed a civil suit against Donald Trump that initially resulted in penalties and a fine of more than $400 million. However, while a divided appeals court upheld Trump's liability, it completely voided the penalty as excessive. Both sides appealed to the New York Court of Appeals. James was briefly a candidate in the 2022 New York gubernatorial election, but suspended her campaign in December 2021, opting to instead run for reelection as attorney general.

In October 2025, James was federally indicted on one count of bank fraud and one count of making false statements to a financial institution. James pled not guilty to the charges. The case was dismissed by a federal judge on November 24, 2025, after which two other grand juries refused to bring charges against her again. Her lawyers described the government's actions as revenge on behalf of the Trump administration. James won reelection in November 2026, beating Republican former federal prosecutor Saritha Komatireddy.

== Early life and education ==
Letitia Ann James was born on October 18, 1958, in Brooklyn, New York. She is one of eight children born to Robert James and Nellie James. Her mother was born in 1919 in Martinsville, Virginia. James was raised in Park Slope, Brooklyn, and attended Fort Hamilton High School in Bay Ridge. She received her Bachelor of Arts from the City University of New York's Lehman College in 1981, majoring in liberal arts with an emphasis in social work.

James received her Juris Doctor degree from Howard University School of Law in Washington, D.C. in 1987, and was admitted to practice law in New York State in 1989. James earned a Master of Public Administration degree in 2013 from Columbia University's School of International and Public Affairs (SIPA), located in Manhattan. She later served as Columbia University's William S. Beinecke Visiting Professor of Public Policy in the Faculty of International and Public Affairs.

== Career ==
James served as a public defender for the Legal Aid Society and established the Urban Network, a coalition of African-American professional organizations aimed at providing scholarships for inner city youth. She served on former New York Governor Mario Cuomo's Task Force on Diversity in the Judiciary. Prior to being admitted to the bar, she served as a legislative staffer for Albert Vann, Chief of Staff for Roger L. Green in the New York State Assembly, and then later in the administration of New York Attorney General Eliot Spitzer. She was appointed the first Assistant Attorney General in charge of the Brooklyn regional office in 1999. While working in that position, James worked in many capacities but focused on consumer complaints involving predatory lending and other unlawful business practices.

=== 2001 and 2003 city council races ===
James's first run for the 35th Council district was in November 2001. James received 42% of the vote on the Working Families Party line, and lost to James E. Davis, a Democrat. In July 2003, just months before the next election, Davis was assassinated by Othniel Askew, a former political rival. Following Davis's death, his brother Geoffrey ran for his vacant council seat on the Democratic Party ticket, but on election day, November 4, 2003, Geoffrey A. Davis lost by a large margin to James as the Working Families Party nominee. In that 2003 race, James officially became a member of the Working Families Party, and was the first citywide office-holder to run solely on the WFP line.

=== City council tenure ===
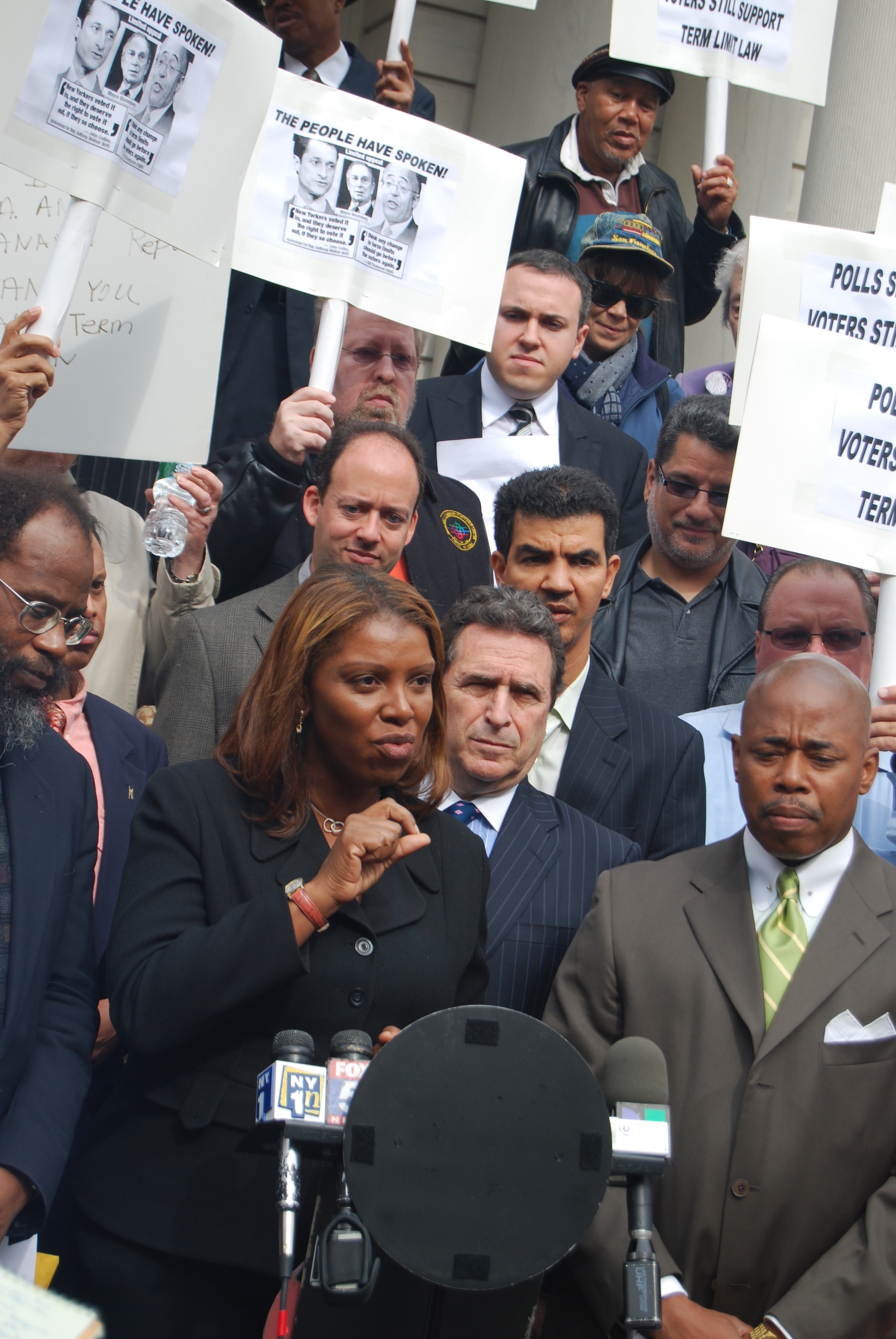
James speaking at City Hall, 2008

James was the first member of the Working Families Party to win office in New York State, and the first third-party member to be elected to the city council since 1977. She has since changed back to the Democratic party. She again won the Working Families and the Democratic parties' nominations by a large margin over Samuel Eric Blackwell, an urban planner at Long Island University and pro-stadium advocate. She was re-elected on the Democratic line on November 8, 2005, with 88.11% of the vote, compared to 6.80% for Republican Anthony Herbert, and 5.08% for Independence Party candidate Charles B. Billups.

On October 10, 2006, there was a devastating fire at the Broken Angel House, an architectural icon in Clinton Hill, Brooklyn. The fire attracted attention from the New York City Department of Buildings, which resulted in citations being issued for numerous building code violations. James represented Broken Angel's owner, Arthur Wood, pro bono in his negotiations with the Department. The agency decided to allow Wood to re-occupy Broken Angel provided the upper levels were taken down and the central stairwell reconstructed; the building was foreclosed on a year later, sold to a developer, and then completely demolished.

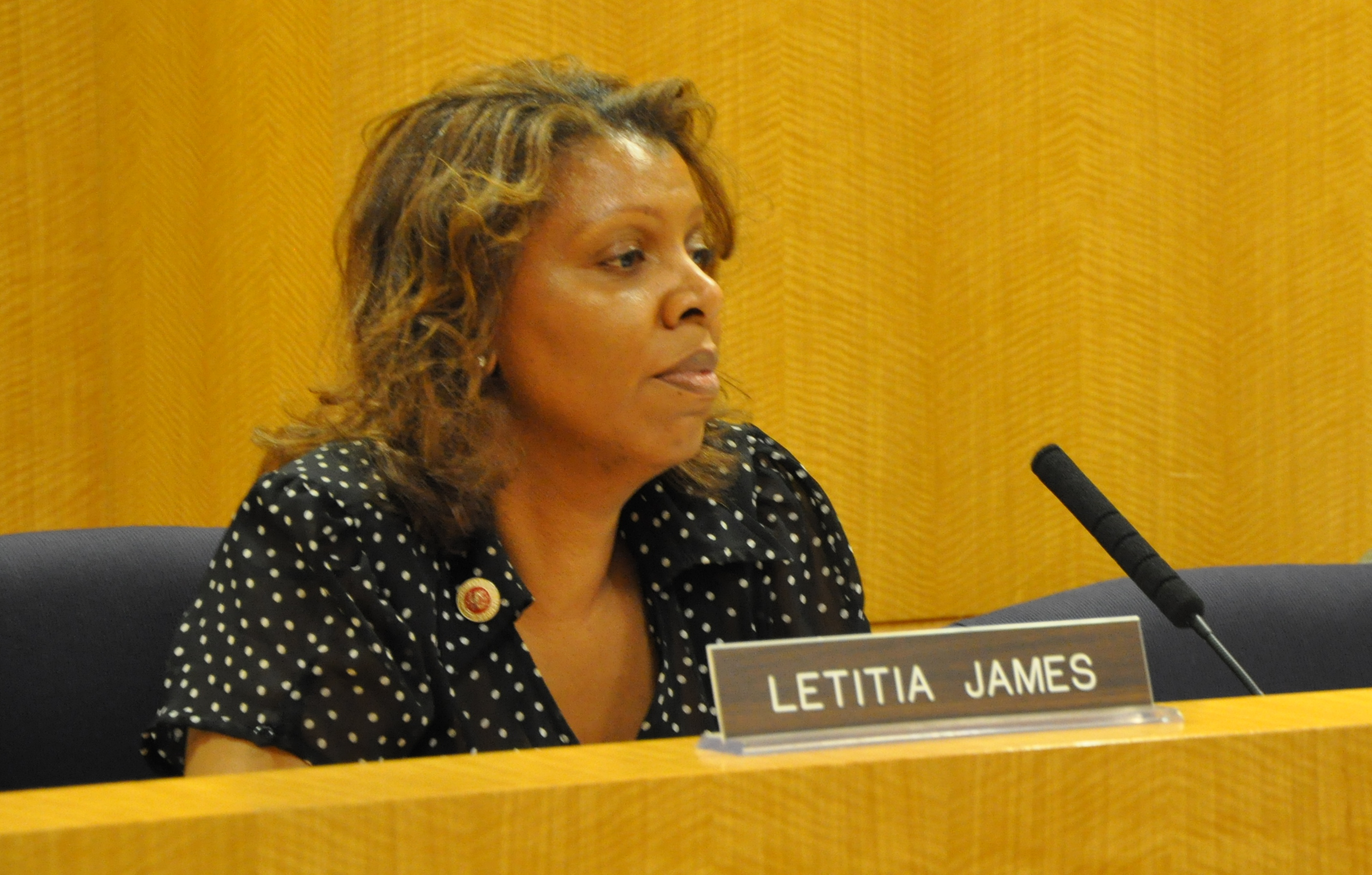
James in the New York City Council in 2009

James was the first to question cost overruns and irregularities in the subcontracting work of the new CityTime payroll system much touted by Bloomberg which eventually led to several indictments, Bloomberg asking a tech giant for $600 million back, and two consultants fleeing the country in 2011.

James originally advocated for the demolition of the Second Empire houses on Admiral's Row in order to build a parking lot for a proposed supermarket to serve residents in nearby housing developments, but later supported preserving some of the historic housing. In 2008, James, with Bill de Blasio, advocated against Mayor Michael Bloomberg's attempts to seek a third term without a voter referendum.

James won the Democratic primary in September 2009 against her opponents, community organizer Delia Hunley-Adossa, who received more than $200,000 from Forest City Ratner and Medhanie Estiphanos, a financial consultant. James went on to win re-election for a second term. In May 2013, with a group that included construction unions, community groups and other elected officials, she was a part of an Article 78 lawsuit against the Bloomberg administration and Acadia Realty Trust seeking the shut-down of the City Point real estate project and a reassessment of its environmental impact; she and her co-plaintiffs lost, as the case was dismissed, allowing the City Point development to proceed with construction.

In June 2016, James attempted to pressure six financial institutions, including BB&T, Berkshire Bank, Citizens Financial Group, People's United Bank, Regions Financial Corporation and TD Bank, into ending its practice of providing financial services to gun manufacturers. BB&T was specifically requested to drop the accounts of SIG Sauer of New Hampshire, but denied the request.

==== Committee assignments ====
- Committee on Economic Development (chair)
- Committee on Sanitation (chair)
- Committee on Parks & Recreation
- Committee on Small Business
- Committee on Technology in Government
- Committee on Veteran Affairs
- Committee on Women's Issues

=== Public Advocate ===
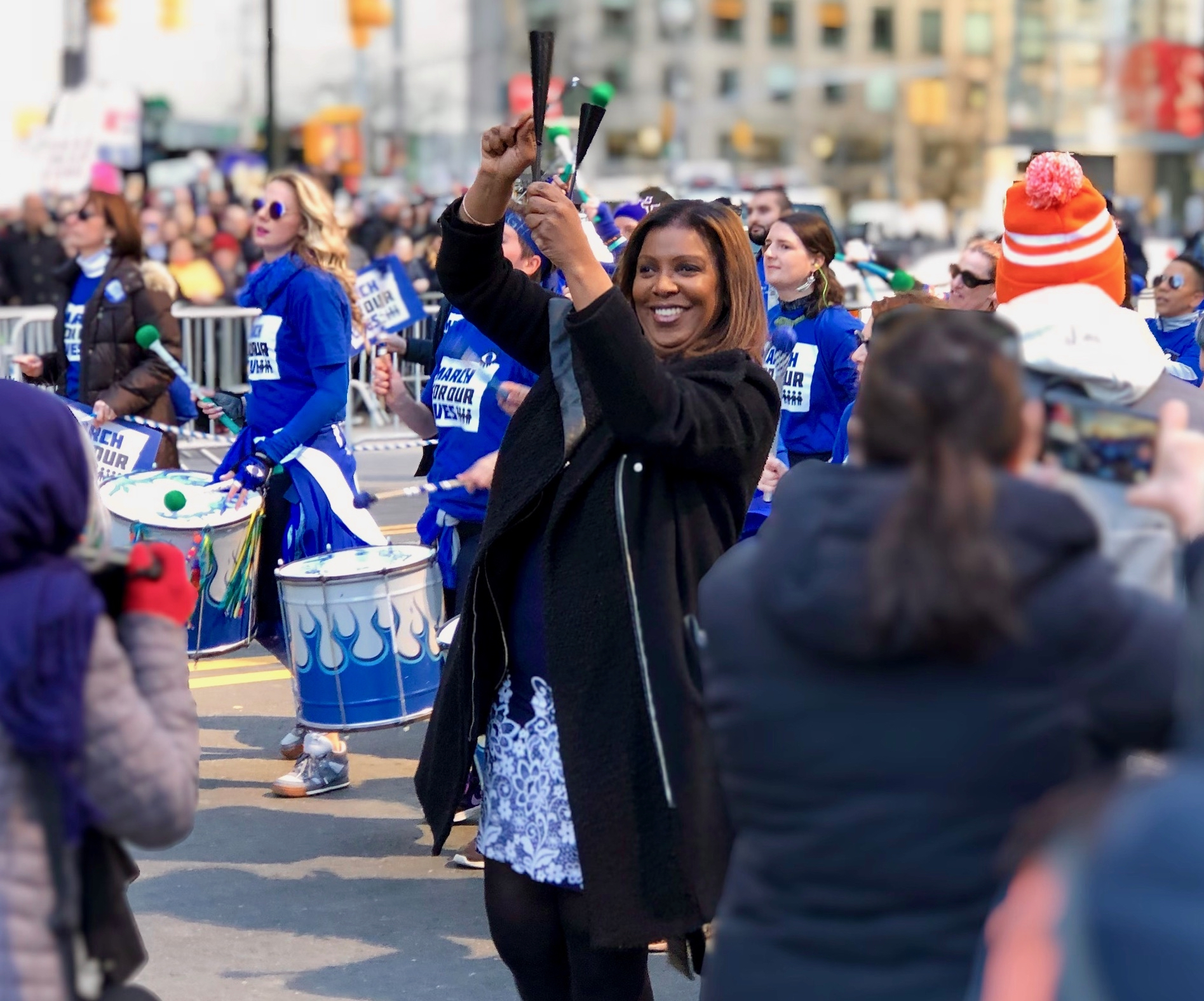
James at the 2018 NYC March For Our Lives rally

In 2013, James ran for New York City Public Advocate and received 36% of the vote in the first Democratic primary, under the 40% threshold that would have avoided a runoff election. James won the runoff election on October 1, 2013, against Daniel Squadron, 59.4%–40.6%, becoming the party's nominee for the city's elected watchdog position in November.

In the 2013 election campaign for Public Advocate, James was endorsed by many of the city's important labor unions, NOW, Planned Parenthood, Democracy for NYC, League of Conservation Voters, Amsterdam News and El Diario. On October 1, 2013, James achieved a Democratic primary win in spite of her campaign fundraising trailing Daniel Squadron's and Reshma Saujani, to become the Democratic Party's nominee for New York City's elected watchdog position. She was endorsed by third-place finisher Saujani in September James won the Democratic runoff election. Without a Republican opponent, she won the general election with over 83% of the vote. In 2017, James won the Democratic primary for her position with 77% of the vote, over closest competitor David Eisenbach's 23%.

== Attorney general of New York (2019–present) ==
=== 2018 election ===
In May 2018, James, who initially planned to run for Mayor of New York City in 2021, declared her candidacy for Attorney General of New York after Eric Schneiderman resigned. She won the Democratic primary on September 13, 2018, with 40.6% of the vote; she defeated Zephyr Teachout (31%), Leecia Eve, and House Representative Sean Patrick Maloney. On November 6, 2018, she was elected Attorney General, defeating Republican Keith Wofford. During her campaign, James vowed to pursue Donald Trump, who she said was an "illegitimate president" and an "embarrassment."

=== Tenure ===
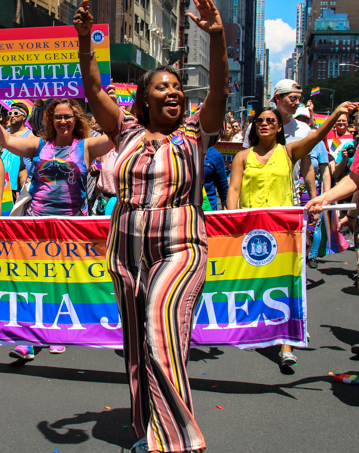
James marching in June 2019 at Stonewall 50 – WorldPride NYC 2019

James was sworn in as attorney general on January 1, 2019, succeeding Barbara Underwood, who was first appointed after the resignation of Eric Schneiderman. She is the first Black woman to serve as a statewide elected official in New York. James is also New York's first Black attorney general and is the first woman to be elected to the post.

=== Suit against All Faiths Cemetery ===
In September 2019, James filed suit against the officials of All Faiths Cemetery in Queens, alleging financial misconduct.

=== State civil suit against the NRA ===
In August 2020, James filed a civil lawsuit in the New York Court of Appeals against the National Rifle Association of America (NRA), accusing the organization of corruption and financial misconduct, and calling for its dissolution (a request that she was not successful in); in ensuing litigation, officers of the NRA were ordered to pay over $6 million dollars to the NRA. The NRA filed a countersuit against James, citing statements she made during her 2018 campaign. In February 2024, a lawsuit brought by the New York Attorney General’s Office under James found that the NRA mismanaged charitable funds when it failed to stop top executives, including CEO Wayne LaPierre, from diverting millions of dollars for lavish personal trips, no-show contracts and other questionable expenditures. A jury found that LaPierre should pay the gun rights group $4.3 million in damages for mismanagement and misspending of charitable funds, having violated his fiduciary duties from 2014 to 2022. The panel also found the NRA’s former CFO Wilson Phillips should pay back $2 million for breaching his fiduciary duties as an executive.

=== Investigation into state COVID-19 response ===
In early March 2020, the attorney general's office began to preliminarily "investigate allegations of COVID-19-related neglect of residents in nursing homes." The office solicited and subsequently received 953 complaints from patients' families regarding neglect of patients through November 16. The probe released its first report on both the nursing homes and the state Department of Health (DOH) on January 28, 2021, where it concluded that the department's public data under-counted nursing home deaths by up to 50 percent. The methodology of the Office of the Attorney General (OAG) was to compare deaths from COVID reported to the DOH and such deaths reported to OAG. The OAG press release makes no mention of medical analysis of the cases. James said investigations into 20 separate nursing homes "whose reported conduct during the first wave of the pandemic presented particular concern" would continue for the foreseeable future. The report was heralded by some in Albany as a "declaration of independence" from New York State Governor Andrew Cuomo after a two-year alliance in opposition to President Donald Trump.

Three weeks after the report, the Albany Times-Union revealed an ongoing joint investigation by the FBI and the United States Attorney for the Eastern District of New York, examining how Governor Cuomo's coronavirus task force played a role in nursing homes' COVID-19 response. On March 18, 2021, The City found that the FBI's scope included a last-minute addition to the state's 2020 budget that provided greater immunity to long-term care organizations. The head of the Greater New York Hospital Association said in an August 2020 New York State Senate hearing that the lobbying group had provided a "draft" of "some ideas to be included" to the governor's office.

=== Report on Andrew Cuomo sexual harassment ===
On August 3, 2021, James's office released a report finding that Cuomo engaged in multiple acts of “unwelcome and nonconsensual touching” and made comments of a “suggestive” sexual nature.

=== 2022 Democratic primary for governor ===
On October 29, 2021, James stated her intention to run for the office of Governor of New York in the 2022 Democratic primary but withdrew from the race in December, after consistently polling behind incumbent Governor Kathy Hochul by wide margins, with James instead choosing to seek reelection as Attorney General.

=== 2022 election ===
After James launched her reelection bid, all previous Democratic candidates withdrew their candidacies and endorsed her. On November 8, 2022, James was reelected Attorney General, defeating Republican Michael Henry in the general election.

=== NFL investigation ===
On May 4, 2023, James and her California counterpart attorney general Rob Bonta announced they would jointly investigate the National Football League over employment practices at its offices in New York City and Los Angeles, citing a report by The New York Times detailing complaints of harassment and discrimination made by former female staffers.

=== 2024 Trump lawsuit in New York ===
In 2022, in her capacity as New York Attorney General, James filed a civil lawsuit against the Trump Organization and worked alongside the Manhattan district attorney's office in its criminal investigation of the organization. Trump argued that previous comments by James, promising to "challenge this illegitimate president" during her campaign for attorney general, prove that she has a political vendetta against him. On February 16, 2024, the fraud case against the former president, Donald Trump, initially proved successful. as Judge Arthur Engoron's 92-page ruling barred Trump from operating any business in New York for three years and fined him more than $355 million. In August 2025, however, the New York appeals court upheld Trump's liability but completely voided the penalty as excessive and violating the U.S. Constitution. James said in August 2025 that she planned to appeal the voiding of the penalty.

=== Supporting Mamdani in the 2025 New York mayoral election ===
James campaigned for Zohran Mamdani, the Democratic front-runner in the 2025 election for mayor of New York City, and they presented themselves as a united front against President Trump.

=== Security clearance revocation ===
In February 2025, President Trump announced the revocation of James's security clearance, along with those of several other officials. Trump stated that the decision was made because they were individuals he "didn't respect," and whom he believed had "come very close" to breaking the law. James's office dismissed the action, stating it had no impact on her work. Some viewed the revocation as an administrative decision, while others suggested it was politically motivated. James herself mocked Trump's action in the New York Times, saying "What security clearance?"

=== Department of Justice lawsuit ===
On February 12, 2025, Attorney General Pam Bondi announced that the U.S. Department of Justice was filing a civil lawsuit against James, as well as other officials in the state such as Kathy Hochul, over their handling of immigration issues.

=== Betar US settlement ===
On January 14, 2026, James reached a settlement with the Zionist activist group Betar US to cease intimidating pro-Palestinian protesters at protests and via social media posts. Betar US also confirmed plans to cease operations in New York.

== 2025 indictment and probes ==
In April 2025, Bill Pulte, President Trump's pick to head the Federal Housing Finance Agency (FHFA), referred James to the United States Department of Justice (DOJ) for possible criminal prosecution, alleging that she had misrepresented facts in three separate instances in order to gain government assistance and more favorable loan terms, by having misrepresented an investment property as her primary residence; by having misrepresented the number of units in an investment property; and by having misrepresented her father as her husband. James denied the allegations, calling them baseless retaliation by President Trump. At the time, Trump had for an extended period called for criminal procedures against James, as well as other political opponents.

In May 2025, the FBI opened a formal criminal probe into the mortgage fraud claims. In response to the accusation that James had improperly claimed a property as her primary residence, her lawyer stated that "she made a mistake on one line [that] had no significance", and presented alternative property deeds containing the correct information, accusing prosecutors of cherry picking information.

In early August, the DOJ escalated its probe, opening a civil rights investigation into her office to examine whether it had violated Trump's civil rights during its New York business fraud lawsuit against the Trump Organization, as well as appointing a special prosecutor to examine her real estate transactions. Attorney General Pam Bondi appointed Ed Martin as special prosecutor. Martin made a written request for her resignation, posed for a photograph in front of her home, and declared he intended to "stick the landing". Kara Scannell wrote for CNN that this "fall[s] outside the norms of prosecutorial conduct".

In September, federal prosecutors in Virginia said they could not find evidence to bring charges. Trump administration officials then informed Erik Siebert, the U.S. attorney for the Eastern District of Virginia, that they intended to fire him. Siebert immediately resigned. In October, Elizabeth Yusi, a top prosecutor for the same district, reportedly planned to inform Lindsey Halligan, the district's interim U.S. attorney, that she likewise found no probable cause to seek charges of mortgage fraud. Halligan pursued charges against James, in which she reportedly did not coordinate with the Department of Justice.

After being presented with evidence by the federal government, a federal grand jury determined probable cause and James was indicted on October 9 in Virginia on one count of bank fraud and one count of making false statements to a financial institution. The case was assigned to Judge Jamar Walker. James pleaded not guilty in court on October 24.

On November 24, federal judge Cameron McGowan Currie dismissed the case, finding that Halligan (who was the only signatory on the indictment) had been unlawfully appointed and thus lacked the authority to bring the charges. Attempts to file a new indictment were unsuccessful, as on December 4 the grand jury refused to re-indict James. Another grand jury rejected a third indictment attempt against her on December 11. On January 8, 2026, the prosecutor leading the civil rights investigation into James was dismissed from the investigation by a federal judge for serving unlawfully; subpoenas related to the investigation were also blocked.

== Personal life ==
James lives in the Clinton Hill neighborhood of Brooklyn, and is a member of Emmanuel Baptist Church. She has never married. At a May 2022 rally, James stated that she supported abortion rights, and had received an abortion early in her tenure as a member of the New York City Council. James said, "I was just elected and I was faced with the decision of whether to have an abortion or not, and I chose to have an abortion. I walked proudly into Planned Parenthood, and I make no apologies to anyone."

== Electoral history ==
=== New York City Council ===
2001 New York City Council's 35th district Democratic primary
Party	Candidate	Votes	%
Democratic	James E. Davis	6,691	37.37%
Democratic	Letitia James	5,746	32.09%
Democratic	Peter Williams	1,823	10.18%
Democratic	Abraham E. Wasserman	1,754	9.80%
Democratic	William J. Saunders	875	4.89%
Democratic	Sidique Wai	556	3.10%
Democratic	Robert A. Hunter	556	3.10%
Total votes		17,907	100%

2001 New York City Council's 35th district general election
Party	Candidate	Votes	%
Democratic	James E. Davis	13,129	55.64%
Working Families	Letitia James	9,762	41.37%
Independence	Sidique Wai	497	2.11%
Liberal	Sidique Wai	210	0.89%
Total	Sidique Wai	707	3.00%
Total votes		23,598	100%
Democratic hold			

2003 New York City Council's 35th district general election
Party	Candidate	Votes	%
Working Families	Letitia James	14,166	76.70%
Democratic	Geoffrey A. Davis	3,077	16.66%
Independence	Geoffrey A. Davis	497	1.71%
Total	Geoffrey A. Davis	3,392	18.36%
Republican	Anthony Herbert	549	2.97%
Conservative	Abraham E. Wasserman	363	1.97%
Total votes		18,470	100%
Working Families gain from Democratic			

2005 New York City Council's 35th district Democratic primary
Party	Candidate	Votes	%
Democratic	Letitia James (incumbent)	8,667	84.92%
Democratic	Samuel Eric Blackwell	1,539	15.08%
Total votes		10,206	100%

2005 New York City Council's 35th district general election
Party	Candidate	Votes	%
Democratic	Letitia James	16,447	77.61%
Working Families	Letitia James	2,275	10.74%
Total	Letitia James (incumbent)	18,722	88.35%
Republican	Anthony Herbert	1,309	6.18%
Conservative	Anthony Herbert	181	0.85%
Total	Anthony Herbert	1,490	7.03%
Independence	Charles B. Billups	979	4.62%
Total votes		21,191	100%
Democratic gain from Working Families			

2009 New York City Council's 35th district Democratic primary
Party	Candidate	Votes	%
Democratic	Letitia James (incumbent)	8,027	81.15%
Democratic	Delia M. Hunley-Adossa	1,539	13.92%
Democratic	Medhanie Estiphanos	488	4.93%
Total votes		9,893	100%

2009 New York City Council's 35th district general election
Party	Candidate	Votes	%
Democratic	Letitia James (incumbent)	19,873	92.29%
Republican	Stuart A. Balberg	1,355	6.29%
Conservative	Stuart A. Balberg	306	1.42%
Total	Stuart A. Balberg	1,661	7.71%
Total votes		21,534	100%
Democratic hold			

=== New York City Public Advocate ===
2013 New York City Public Advocate Democratic primary
Party	Candidate	Votes	%
Democratic	Letitia James	191,347	36.11%
Democratic	Daniel Squadron	178,151	33.62%
Democratic	Reshma Saujani	76,983	14.53%
Democratic	Cathy Guerriero	69,025	13.03%
Democratic	Sidique Wai	14,409	2.72%
Total votes		529,915	100%

2013 New York City Public Advocate Democratic primary runoff
Party	Candidate	Votes	%
Democratic	Letitia James	119,604	59.02%
Democratic	Daniel Squadron	83,043	40.98%
Total votes		202,647	100%

2013 New York City Public Advocate general election
Party	Candidate	Votes	%
Democratic	Letitia James	761,058	77.87%
Working Families	Letitia James	53,821	5.51%
Total	Letitia James	814,879	83.37%
Conservative	Robert Maresca	119,768	12.25%
Green	James Lane	16,974	1.74%
Libertarian	Alex Merced	10,419	1.07%
Socialist Workers	Deborah O. Liatos	5,114	0.52%
War Veterans	Irene Estrada	4,216	0.43%
Students First	Mollina G. Fabricant	2,391	0.24%
Freedom Party	Michael K. Lloyd	1,799	0.18
Total votes		975,560	100%
Democratic hold			

2017 New York City Public Advocate Democratic primary
Party	Candidate	Votes	%
Democratic	Letitia James (incumbent)	300,301	76.50%
Democratic	David Eisenbach	92,246	23.50%
Total votes		392,547	100%

2017 New York City Public Advocate general election
Party	Candidate	Votes	%
Democratic	Letitia James	186,916	73.10%
Working Families	Letitia James	16,586	6.49%
Total	Letitia James (incumbent)	203,502	79.58%
Republican	Juan Carlos Polanco	31,206	12.20%
Reform	Juan Carlos Polanco	1,704	0.67%
Stop De Blasio	Juan Carlos Polanco	988	0.39%
Total	Juan Carlos Polanco	33,898	13.26%
Conservative	Michael A. O'Reilly	9,868	3.86%
Green	James C. Lane	6,160	2.41%
Libertarian	Devin Balkin	2,276	0.89%
Total votes		255,704	100%
Democratic hold			

=== New York Attorney General ===
2018 New York Attorney General Democratic primary
Party	Candidate	Votes	%
Democratic	Letitia James	608,308	38.53%
Democratic	Zephyr Teachout	468,083	29.65%
Democratic	Sean Patrick Maloney	379,099	24.02%
Democratic	Leecia Eve	52,367	3.32%
Total votes		1,578,588	100%

2018 New York Attorney General general election
Party	Candidate	Votes	%
Democratic	Letitia James	3,497,213	58.38%
Working Families	Letitia James	152,350	2.54%
Independence	Letitia James	89,676	1.50%
Total	Letitia James	3,739,239	62.42%
Republican	Keith Wofford	1,851,510	30.91%
Conservative	Keith Wofford	257,090	4.29%
Total	Keith Wofford	2,108,600	35.20%
Green	Michael Sussman	72,512	1.21%
Libertarian	Christopher Garvey	43,767	0.73%
Reform	Nancy Sliwa	26,441	0.44%
Total votes		5,990,559	100%
Democratic hold			

2022 New York Attorney General general election
Party	Candidate	Votes	%
Democratic	Letitia James	2,769,312	49.29%
Working Families	Letitia James	280,150	4.99%
Total	Letitia James (incumbent)	3,049,462	54.28%
Republican	Michael Henry	2,262,323	40.27%
Conservative	Michael Henry	306,187	5.45%
Total	Michael Henry	2,568,510	45.72%
Total votes		5,617,972	100%
Democratic hold			

== See also ==
- Joe Biden Supreme Court candidates
- List of female state attorneys general in the United States

Political offices
Preceded by Bill de Blasio	New York City Public Advocate; 2014–2018	Succeeded by Corey Johnson; Acting
Party political offices
Preceded by Eric Schneiderman	Democratic nominee for Attorney General of New York; 2018, 2022, 2026	Most recent
Legal offices
Preceded by Barbara Underwood	Attorney General of New York; 2019–present	Incumbent
