= Edison Tech Center =

Interactive learning center in Schenectady, New York

Coordinates: 42.813941°N 73.942478°W

The Edison Tech Center is a learning center with a central emphasis on electrical and mechanical engineering. The organization was founded in 2001 under the name Edison Exploratorium, and changed to Edison Steinmetz Center and finally the Edison Tech Center in 2009.

The Center was created to focus on engineering education while keeping the connection to the historical and human story behind the field. Electrical engineer, IEEE Fellow and founder John D. Harnden Jr. saw a need to keep the focus on engineering and the story of the development of electricity whereas other educational organizations like museums and historical societies had broader missions and broader audiences that did not allow for the in-depth focus that could be done with a dedicated organization.

== Founding ==
The Edison Tech Center was founded by John D. Harnden Jr. of the General Electric Research Laboratory and General Engineering Laboratory. Harnden established himself as an electrical engineer in the beginning of the solid-state age. Through the 1950s and 60s he worked on LCDs, piezoelectric devices, pressure sensors, induction cooktops and other things. His most notable projects were on the GEMOV surge protection device (now found in every home) as well as improvements in switches for the telephone industry. Mr. Harnden eventually managed many engineers and reported to GE's company presidents and lab directors over the years. He dealt with inspiring business managers like Oliver Winn (GE's battery business) and difficult ones including Jack Welch. During his long career he worked with well known engineers from other companies who spent summers on special projects, including Gordon Moore and Simon Ramo.

== Facilities ==
The learning center and adjoining artifact storage buildings were closed in 2018 and its artifacts were moved to another storage facility in Schenectady, New York. Schenectady was the historical headquarters of General Electric and George Westinghouse Senior and has a strong economic and social tie to the electrical industry. The center has thousands of artifacts ranging from rare engineering prototypes to common household electrical appliances of decades ago. Artifacts and displays were laid out in a flexible and informal fashion so that visitors may touch and interact with the objects, this differed from museums and aligned with the stated goal from Mr. Harnden of having a "workshop of engineers" and tinker space. Displays have included: batteries, generators, electric motors, lighting technology, power transmission, microwaves, audio recording, video recording, washing machines, ovens and kitchen appliances, televisions, telephones, and radios. Artifacts include some of the newest available consumer products to show contrast of old and new.

== Online presence ==
The Edison Tech Center reached millions of visitors online between its website and online video channels. The organization publishes new media and television programs on prominent engineers of the electrical age and various technologies. Since 2008 the center has expanded its online presence to include videos and more in-depth web pages. The website provides information on everything from the history of the transformer to locations showcasing the latest in engineering. Since the early years of the organization the focus shifted from only General Electric's history to pioneers of technology from all parts of the world. Engineers from government and private companies have contributed time and content to various projects including Rensselaer Polytechnic Institute, Seagate Technology, University of California, Santa Barbara, IPU (Moscow), International Federation of Automatic Control, Lockheed Martin, Caterpillar, Union College and of course General Electric.

== Programs ==
The organization has several programs which are funded by grants and private donors. The Wizards of Schenectady Program is a series of television shows and connected publicity events which highlight prominent Schenectady-based engineers who worked at General Electric. The Edison Tech Center collaborated with the Minerals Education Coalition on a video series highlighting raw materials processing for materials used in electronics called Minerals in our Electrical World. Another video and web curriculum program was "Tour EL" which was the first program extensively cover the history of the electric light and include multimedia.

Outside of educational programs the organization has made donations of engineering related toys to Toys for Tots and the Schenectady Day Nursery.
