= Crystal Hudson =

American politician (born 1983)

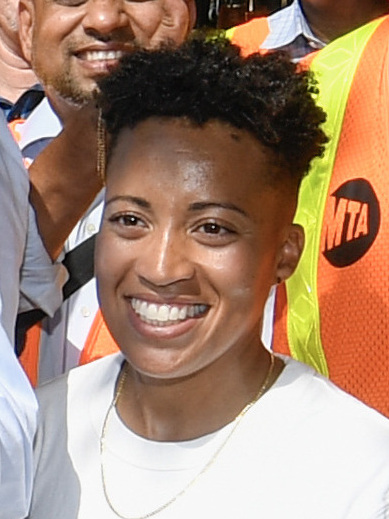

Member of the New York City Council from the 35th district
- Incumbent
- Assumed office January 1, 2022
- Preceded by: Laurie Cumbo

Personal details
- Born: April 14, 1983 (age 43)
- Party: Democratic
- Education: Spelman College (BA); George Washington University (MA)
- Website: Official website Campaign website

Crystal R. Hudson (born April 14, 1983) is an American politician from New York City. A Democrat, she represents the 35th district of the New York City Council, which covers parts of central Brooklyn.

== Early life and education ==
Born and raised in Prospect Heights, Brooklyn, Hudson graduated from Spelman College with a degree in economics and later received a Master's degree in Tourism Administration from George Washington University.

== Career ==
Hudson began her career working for the Washington Mystics, a WNBA team based in Washington, D.C. In 2011, she joined Amtrak as a marketing executive.

After moving back to New York City to care for her mother, Carole Kay, Hudson switched to public policy work, joining Brooklyn Community Board 8 and later working for Councilwoman Laurie Cumbo as her chief of operations. Hudson was chosen in 2019 to be a Deputy Public Advocate under Public Advocate Jumaane Williams, a position she held until the beginning of her campaign for New York City Council.

=== 2021 City Council campaign ===
In 2020, Hudson announced her 2021 campaign to succeed the term-limited Cumbo in the City Council's 35th district. She was quickly regarded as a frontrunner in the race, raising the most money of any candidate in the field and receiving influential endorsements from Congressmembers Hakeem Jeffries and Yvette Clarke, neighboring Councilman Brad Lander, and most of the city's major unions.

Hudson's main competition came from tenant organizer Michael Hollingsworth, who was backed by the New York City Democratic Socialists of America and politicians from the city's leftmost flank. The race was characterized by Gotham Gazette as "split[ting] the city's left," as Hudson similarly claimed "progressive" policy positions and endorsements, but was put on the defensive about her establishment ties and work for the controversial Cumbo. Hudson worked to distance herself from Cumbo during the campaign, writing an op-ed for Bklyner.com calling one of Cumbo's key policy achievements a "disgrace."

On election night on June 22, Hudson led Hollingsworth 38–34% in first-place votes, with minor candidates taking the remainder; when absentee ballots and ranked-choice votes were counted, Hudson expanded her lead to 54–46%. She declared victory, and Hollingsworth conceded defeat, on July 6. Hudson faced minimal opposition in the November general election, and won. Hudson became the first out gay Black woman ever elected to the New York City Council, along with Kristin Richardson Jordan of Harlem.

=== City Council tenure ===
In February 2024, Hudson led an effort to block the construction of a 150-unit apartment building (with dozens of apartments set aside for affordable housing) at a vacant lot in Crown Heights in her district. She has said that she will not support new rental housing unless somewhere between 20-80% of the units are set aside for income-restricted housing. By the end of 2024, the lot for the proposed building remained a dirt lot.

On October 23, 2024, Hudson introduced a resolution to the New York City Council to proclaim October 20 as New York Liberty Day. The Liberty Women's Basketball team won the Women's National Basketball Association's (WNBA) championship tournament on October 20, 2024. The victory was the first time in over 50 years that a team from New York won a championship in the sport of basketball.

Hudson introduced a motion to rename a section of a Crown Heights street "Lubavitcher Rebbe Way,” honoring Chabad's contributions to community resources for education, drug rehabilitation, and elder care.

As chair of the council's aging committee, Hudson worked to expand access to free legal representation and housing court for those over 65. She introduced "Age in Place NYC" legislation that included providing culturally relevant programming at senior centers. Hudson passed legislation to increase access to doula services, in an effort to reduce the maternal mortality rate during childbirth, a particularly pressing issue for Black women.

== Personal life ==
Hudson is openly gay, and lives in Prospect Heights with her partner, political strategist Sasha Neha Ahuja. Hudson served as the primary caregiver for her mother, who suffered from Alzheimer's disease, until she died in April 2021. Hudson and her wife became parents to a baby girl, Cy, in 2023. Hudson noted that "For a city council that is majority women, I think now we have more mothers than we’ve ever had."

== Electoral history ==
=== 2025 ===
2025 New York City Council Democratic primary, District 35
Party	Candidate	Votes	%
Democratic	Crystal Hudson (incumbent)	34,286	84.6
Democratic	Dion M. Ashman	3,214	7.9
Democratic	Hector Robertson	1,881	4.6
Democratic	Kenny Lever	913	2.3
Write-in		225	0.6
Total votes		40,519	100.0

2025 New York City Council election, District 35
Party	Candidate	Votes	%
Democratic	Crystal Hudson	42,212	67.4
Working Families	Crystal Hudson	15,842	25.3
Total	Crystal Hudson (incumbent)	58,054	92.7
Conservative	Benny Rosenberger	3,352	5.4
United Alliance	Hector Robertson	1,033	1.6
Write-in		170	0.3
Total votes		62,609	100.0
Democratic hold			

=== 2023 ===
2023 New York City Council election, District 35
Party	Candidate	Votes	%
Democratic	Crystal Hudson	10,094	70.5
Working Families	Crystal Hudson	3,842	26.8
Total	Crystal Hudson (incumbent)	13,936	97.4
Write-in		377	2.6
Total votes		14,313	100.0
Democratic hold			

=== 2021 ===
2021 New York City Council Democratic primary, District 35
Party	Candidate	Maximum round	Maximum votes	Share in maximum round	Maximum votes First round votes Transfer votes
Democratic	Crystal Hudson	3	16,564	54.0%	
Democratic	Michael Hollingsworth	3	14,138	46.0%	
Democratic	Renee T. Collymore	2	4,438	12.7%	
Democratic	Curtis M. Harris	2	1,652	4.7%	
Democratic	Regina A. Kinsey	2	1,637	4.7%	
Democratic	Deirdre M. Levy	2	1,398	4.0%	
Democratic	Hector Robertson	2	504	1.4%	
Write-In		1	68	0.2%	

2021 New York City Council election, District 35
Party	Candidate	Votes	%
Democratic	Crystal Hudson	29,003	94.7
Common Sense	Regina A. Kinsey	1,475	4.8
Write-in		161	0.5
Total votes		30,639	100.0
Democratic hold			

== See also ==
- LGBT culture in New York City
- List of LGBT people in New York City
- NYC Pride March
