= New York City's 28th City Council district =

- Boundaries following the 2020 census

Government
  - Councilmember: Ty Hankerson (D—South Ozone Park)

Population (2010)
  - Total: 147,327

Demographics
  - Black: 48%
  - Hispanic: 19%
  - Asian: 16%
  - White: 3%
  - Other: 13%

Registration
  - Democratic: 73.6%
  - Republican: 5.4%
  - No party preference: 18.4%
- Registered voters (2021) 105,612

New York City's 28th City Council district is one of 51 districts in the New York City Council. It has been represented by Democrat Ty Hankerson since 2026, succeeding fellow Democrat and former Council Speaker Adrienne Adams.

== Geography ==
District 28 covers a series of predominantly Black neighborhoods in southeastern Queens, including some or all of Richmond Hill, Jamaica, South Ozone Park, and Rochdale Village. Much of John F. Kennedy International Airport is located in the district, as is Baisley Pond Park.

The district overlaps with Queens Community Boards 9, 10, and 12, and is contained entirely within New York's 5th congressional district. It also overlaps with the 10th, 14th, and 15th districts of the New York State Senate, and with the 24th, 31st, 32nd, and 38th districts of the New York State Assembly.

== Recent election results ==
=== 2025 ===
The 2025 New York City Council elections will be held on November 4, 2025, with primary elections occurring on June 24, 2025.

2025 New York City Council election, District 28 Democratic primary
| Party | Candidate | Maximum round | Maximum votes | Share in maximum round | Maximum votes First round votes Transfer votes |
|---|---|---|---|---|---|
| Democratic | Ty Hankerson | 5 | 6,528 | 58.8% | |
| Democratic | Japneet Singh | 5 | 4,583 | 41.2% | |
| Democratic | Latoya LeGrand | 4 | 2,803 | 22.6% | |
| Democratic | Ruben Wills | 3 | 2,096 | 15.5% | |
| Democratic | Romeo Hitlall | 2 | 1,240 | 8.8% | |
| Write-in | | 1 | 0 | 0.5% | |

2025 New York City Council election, District 28 general election
| Party | Candidate | Votes | % |
|---|---|---|---|
| Democratic | Tyrell Hankerson | 22,258 | |
| Working Families | Tyrell Hankerson | 2,165 | |
| Total | Tyrell Hankerson | 24,423 | 99.4 |
| Write-in | | 150 | 0.6 |
| Total votes | | 24,573 | 100.0 |
| Democratic hold | | | |

=== 2023 (redistricting) ===
Due to redistricting and the 2020 changes to the New York City Charter, councilmembers elected during the 2021 and 2023 City Council elections will serve two-year terms, with full four-year terms resuming after the 2025 New York City Council elections.

2023 New York City Council election, District 28
| Party | Candidate | Votes | % |
|---|---|---|---|
| Democratic | Adrienne Adams (incumbent) | 6,521 | 85.0 |
| Republican | Rusat Ramgopal | 1,019 | |
| Common Sense | Rusat Ramgopal | 60 | |
| Total | Rusat Ramgopal | 1,079 | 14.1 |
| Write-in | | 72 | 0.9 |
| Total votes | | 7,672 | 100 |
| Democratic hold | | | |

=== 2021 ===
In 2019, voters in New York City approved Ballot Question 1, which implemented ranked-choice voting in all local elections. Under the new system, voters have the option to rank up to five candidates for every local office. Voters whose first-choice candidates fare poorly will have their votes redistributed to other candidates in their ranking until one candidate surpasses the 50 percent threshold. If one candidate surpasses 50 percent in first-choice votes, then ranked-choice tabulations will not occur.

An interactive map of District 28

2021 New York City Council election, District 28
Primary election
| Party | Candidate | Votes | % |
|---|---|---|---|
| Democratic | Adrienne Adams (incumbent) | 7,490 | 53.4 |
| Democratic | Ruben Wills | 3,379 | 24.1 |
| Democratic | Japneet Singh | 3,105 | 22.1 |
| Write-in | | 51 | 0.4 |
| Total votes | | 14,035 | 100 |
General election
| Democratic | Adrienne Adams (incumbent) | 13,488 | 88.8 |
| Republican | Ivan Mossop | 1,671 | 11.0 |
| Write-in | | 33 | 0.2 |
| Total votes | | 15,192 | 100 |
| Democratic hold | | | |

=== 2017 ===
2017 New York City Council election, District 28
Primary election
| Party | Candidate | Votes | % |
|---|---|---|---|
| Democratic | Adrienne Adams | 3,499 | 39.2 |
| Democratic | Richard David | 2,822 | 31.6 |
| Democratic | Hettie Powell | 2,589 | 29.0 |
| Write-in | | 22 | 0.2 |
| Total votes | | 8,932 | 100 |
General election
| Democratic | Adrienne Adams | 14,767 | 86.1 |
| Working Families | Hettie Powell | 1,434 | 8.4 |
| Republican | Ivan Mossop | 919 | 5.4 |
| Write-in | | 30 | 0.1 |
| Total votes | | 17,150 | 100 |
| Democratic hold | | | |

=== 2013 ===
2013 New York City Council election, District 28
Primary election
| Party | Candidate | Votes | % |
|---|---|---|---|
| Democratic | Ruben Wills (incumbent) | 5,095 | 48.9 |
| Democratic | Hettie Powell | 3,435 | 33.0 |
| Democratic | Eugen Walter Evans | 1,080 | 10.4 |
| Democratic | David Kayode | 809 | 7.8 |
| Write-in | | 1 | 0.0 |
| Total votes | | 10,420 | 100 |
General election
| Democratic | Ruben Wills (incumbent) | 14,996 | 95.2 |
| Unity | Mireille Leroy | 731 | 4.7 |
| Write-in | | 20 | 0.1 |
| Total votes | | 15,747 | 100 |
| Democratic hold | | | |
