= List of Queens College people =

This is a list of notable alumni and faculty of Queens College, City University of New York.

== Business ==
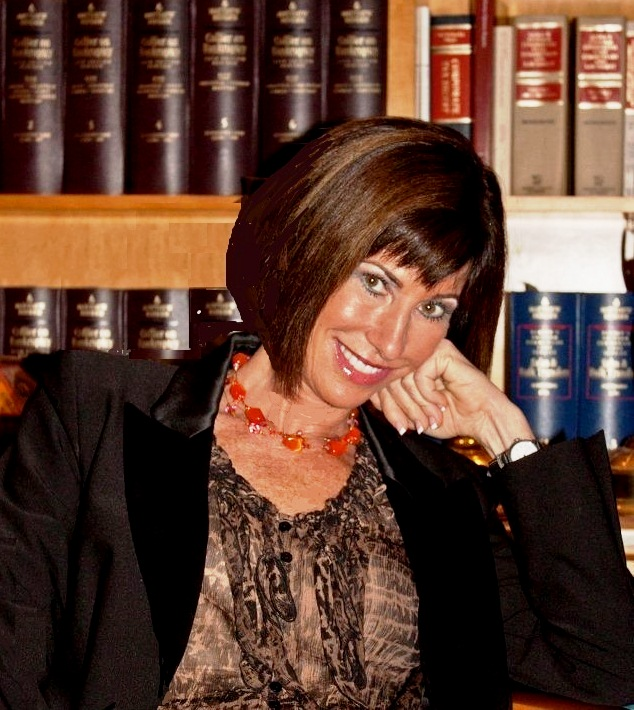
Cindy Rakowitz

- Leslie Abramson - attorney, defended Lyle and Erik Menendez
- Russell Artzt - co-founder, Computer Associates
- Gary Barnett - founder of Extell Development Company
- Jill E. Barad - former CEO of Mattel
- David Cancel - serial technology entrepreneur; entrepreneur in residence at Harvard Business School
- Jerry Colonna - venture capitalist and entrepreneur coach
- Eugene R. Fidell - attorney, Guantanamo Bay detention camp critic
- Mark M. Ford - entrepreneur
- Lee Garfinkel - former CEO of the New York office of Foote, Cone & Belding
- Leonard Grunstein - finance executive
- Charlie Harary - investor and motivational speaker
- Patricia Hynes - former president of the New York City Bar Association
- Frederick S. Jaffe - former vice president of Planned Parenthood Federation of America
- Stewart Liff - management consultant and author
- Ruth Madoff - wife of Bernard L. Madoff
- Donna Orender - WNBA president
- Cindy Rakowitz - division president for Playboy Enterprises (1986–2001)
- Jeffrey Steinberger - trial attorney, TV commentator and analyst
- Charles Wang - founder of Computer Associates, owner of the New York Islanders

== Education ==
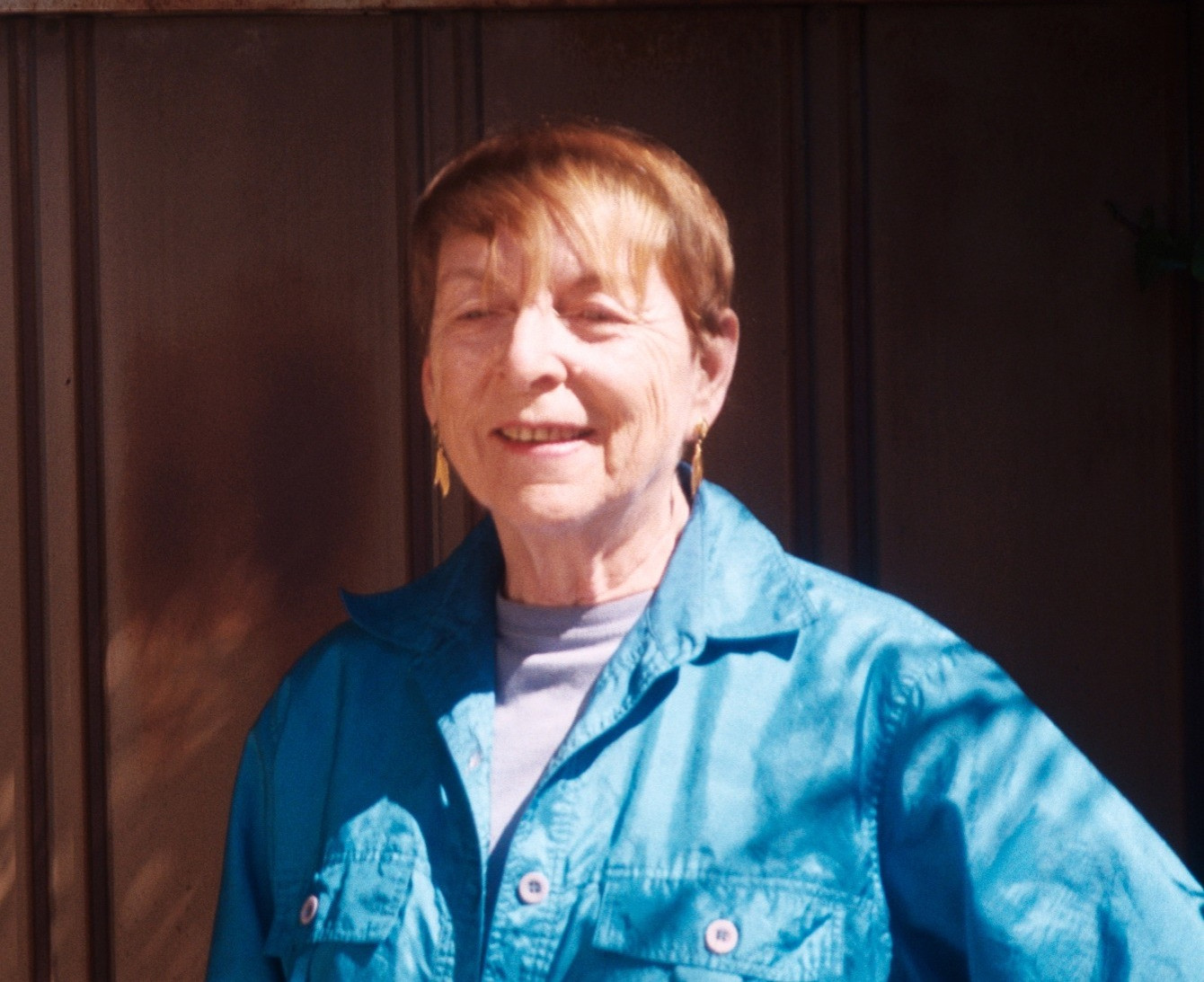
Elaine Barkin

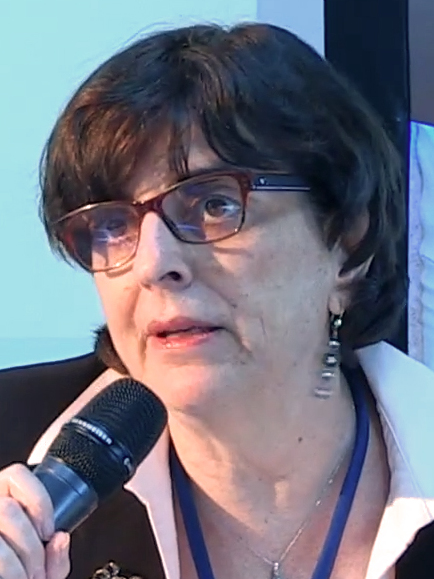
Ester Fuchs

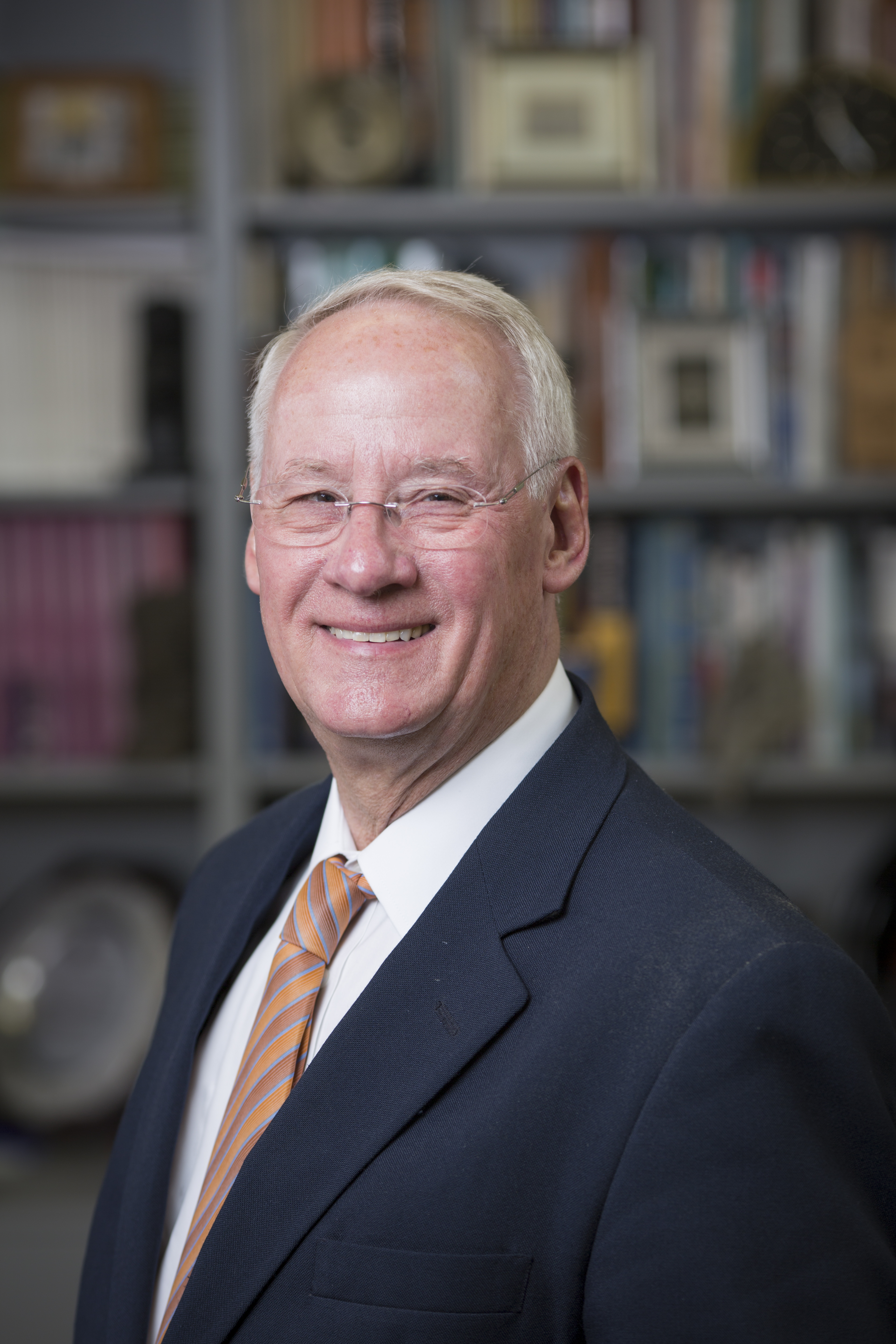
Edward John Ray

- Stevanne Auerbach - psychologist, "Dr. Toy"
- Werner Baer - Jorge Lemann Professor of Economics at University of Illinois Urbana-Champaign
- Elaine Barkin - music theorist educator
- Warren Bebbington - retired vice-chancellor, University of Adelaide
- Jean-Claude Brizard - CEO of Chicago Public Schools
- Vévé Amasasa Clark - professor of African-American studies at the University of California, Berkeley
- Ester Fuchs - professor of Public Affairs and Political Science, Columbia University
- Jeffrey Halperin - professor of Psychology
- Arthur M. Langer - professor of Professional Practice, Columbia University, founder of Workforce Opportunity Services
- Cheryl Lehman - accounting academic
- Stephanie Pace Marshall - founder of Illinois Math and Science Academy
- Joseph S. Murphy (1933–1998) - president of Queens College, president of Bennington College, and chancellor of the City University of New York
- Edward John Ray - president of Oregon State University
- Linda Siegel - cognitive psychologist, holder of the Dorothy C. Lam Chair in Special Education at the University of British Columbia 1996–2015

== Entertainment and media ==
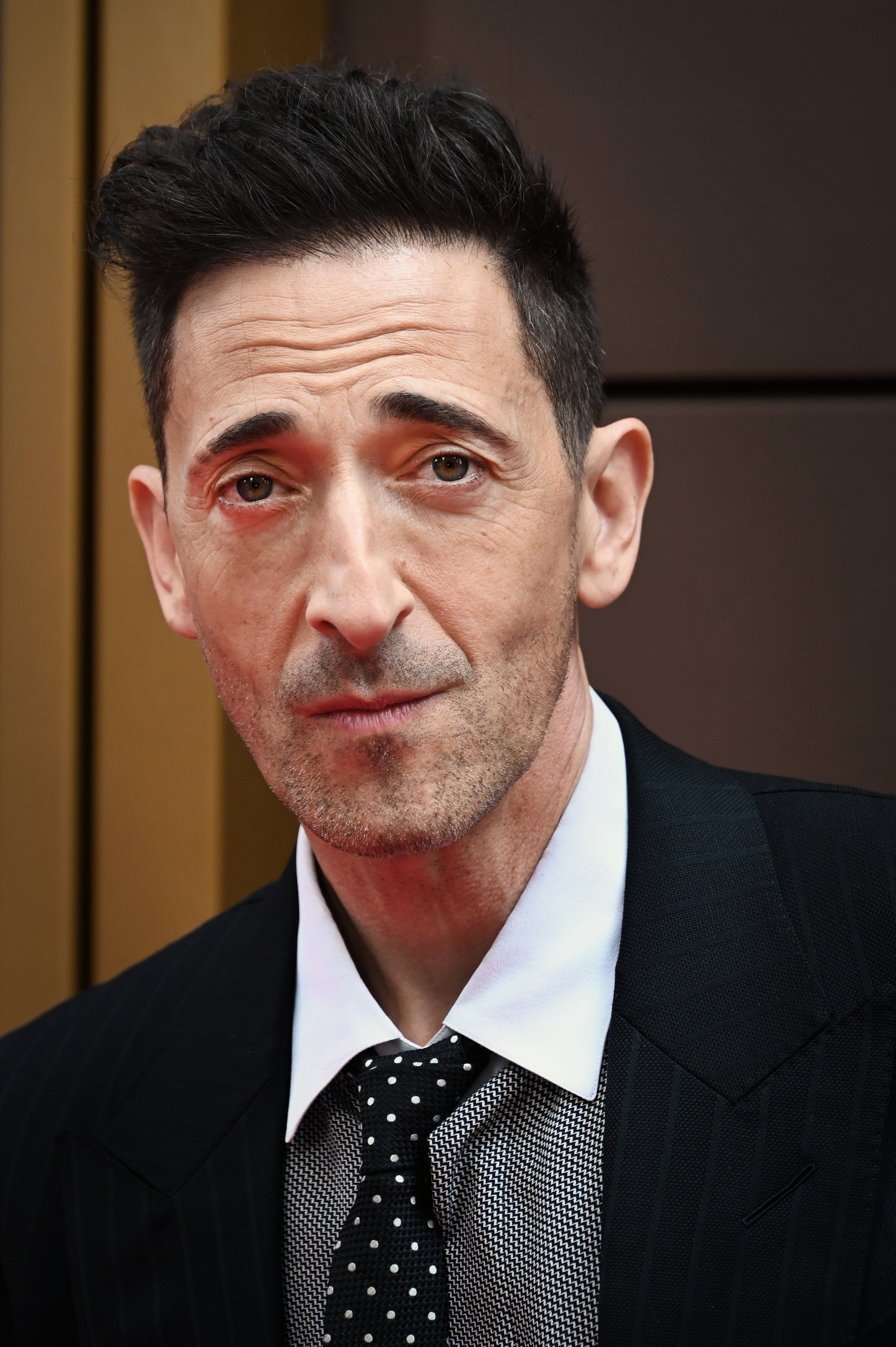
Adrien Brody

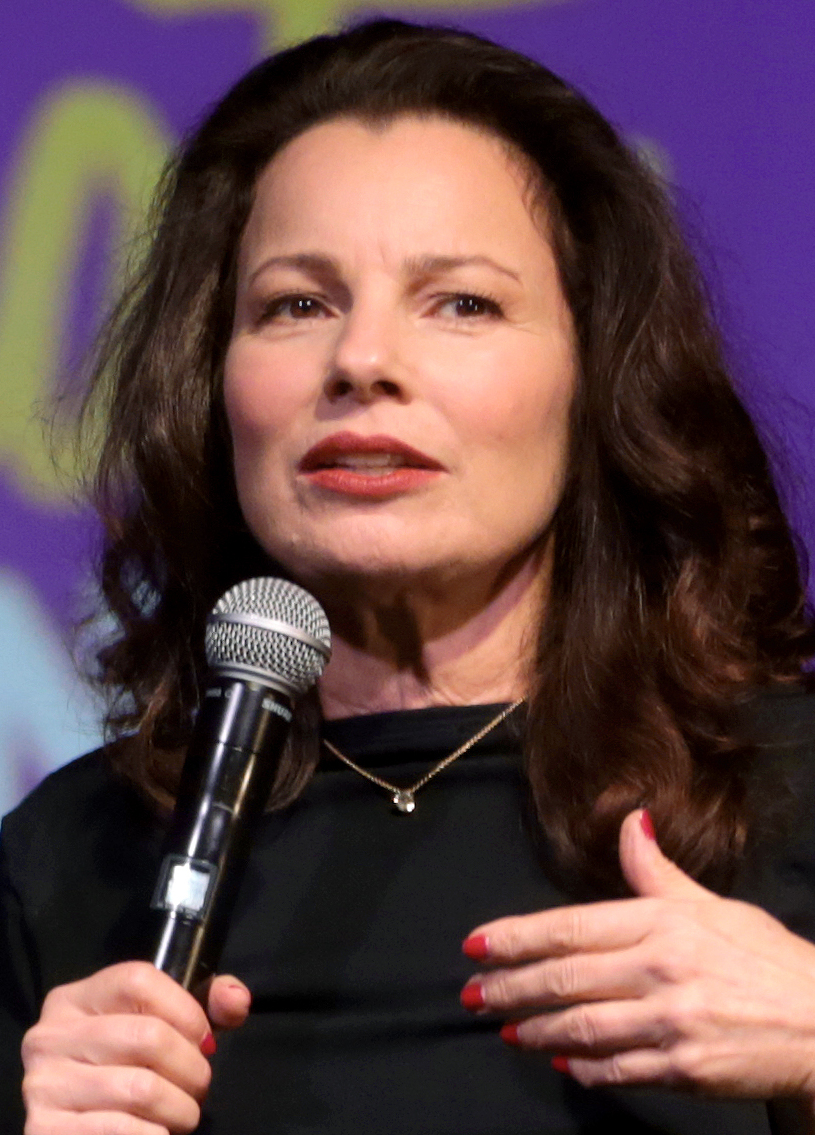
Fran Drescher

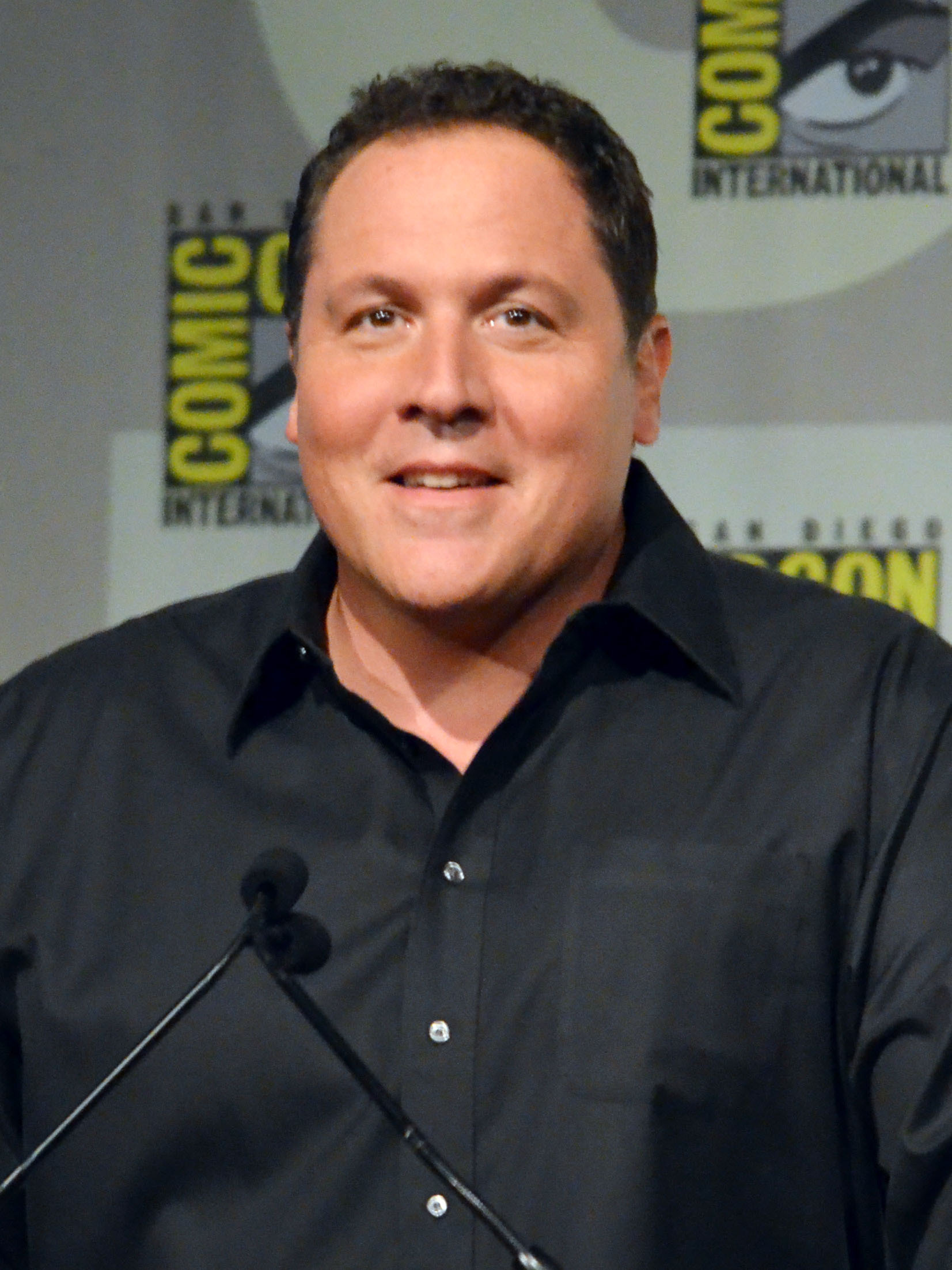
Jon Favreau

Carole King

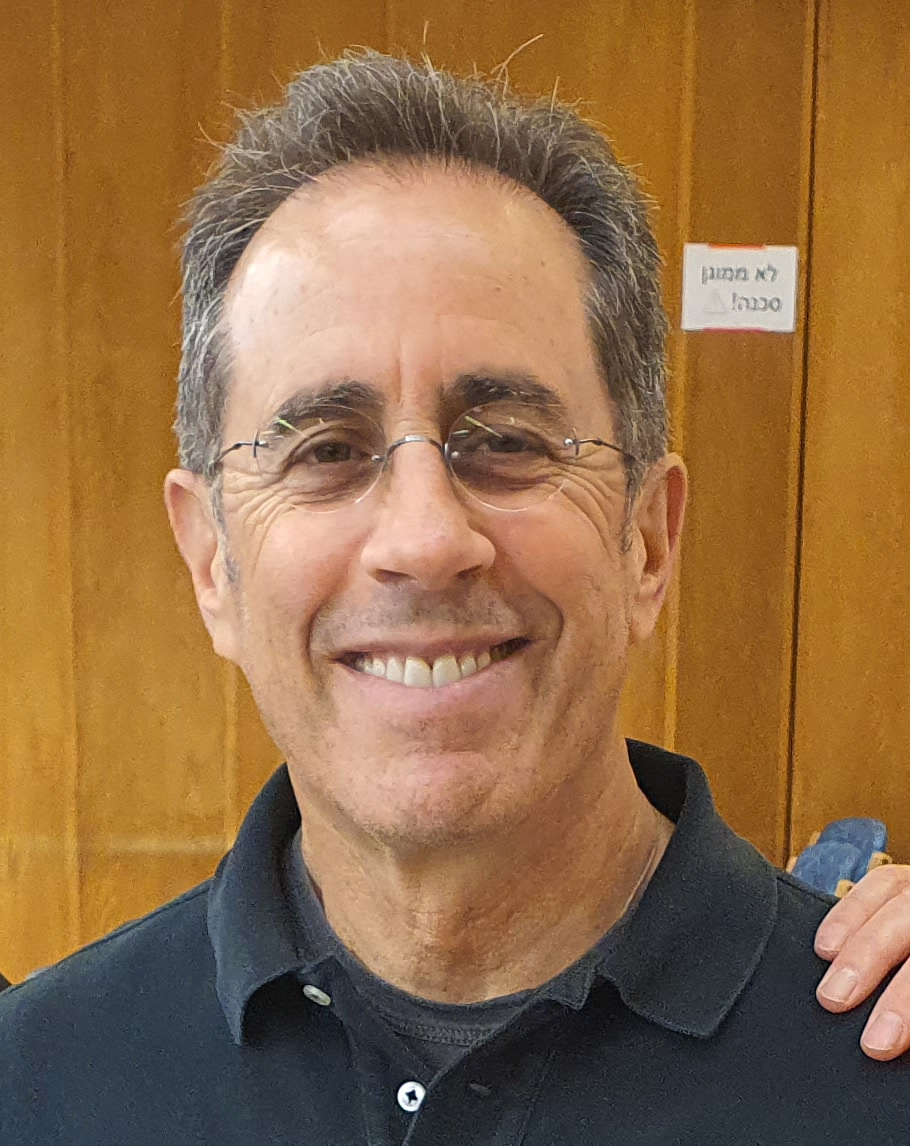
Jerry Seinfeld

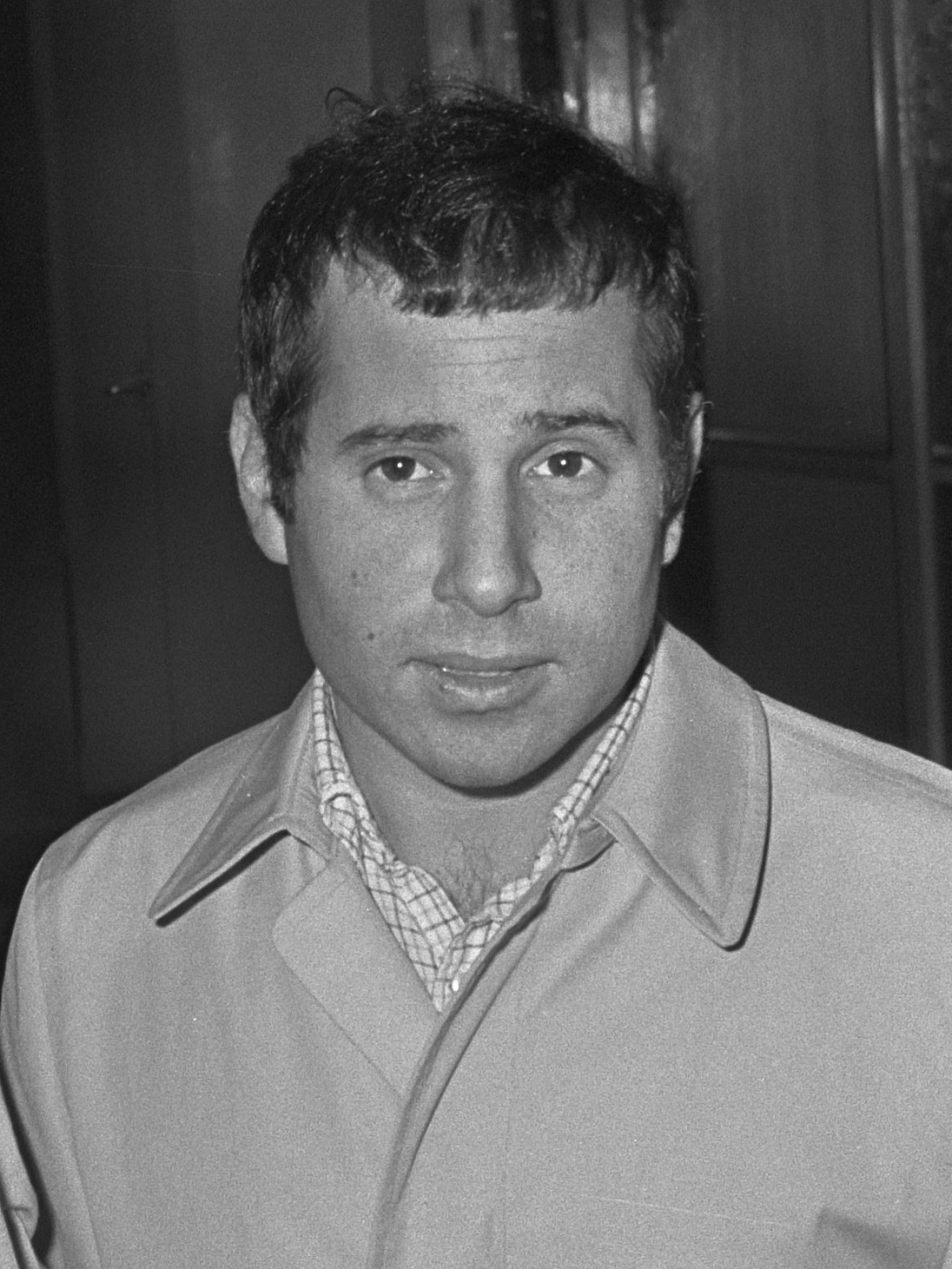
Paul Simon

- Ted Alexandro - comedian
- Martin Aronstein - theatrical lighting designer
- Annet Artani - singer, songwriter, co-wrote "Everytime" with Britney Spears
- Jay Bak - rapper and singer based in South Korea
- Lidia Bastianich - celebrity chef and host of Lidia's Italy
- Joy Behar - comedian and co-host of The View
- Adrien Brody - actor, Academy Award winner, attended in 1990
- Glen Brunman - film and television soundtrack executive and producer
- Danny Burstein - Broadway actor
- Fran Capo - comedian
- Lucille Carra - documentary film producer
- Angelo Corrao - Italian-American film editor
- Jason Cuadrado - director and producer
- Yanna Darili - model, Greek television personality
- Peter Dizozza - composer
- Fran Drescher - actress, producer The Nanny
- Dennis Elsas - radio personality at WNEW–FM, WFUV–FM
- Nargis Fakhri - model and Bollywood actress
- Jon Favreau - actor and director, director of Iron Man and Iron Man 2
- David Zelag Goodman - screenwriter, playwright
- Marvin Hamlisch - Hollywood and Broadway composer
- Annette Insdorf - film historian and author
- Alan Jacobson - thriller writer
- Ron Jeremy - prolific pornographic film actor
- Herb Kaplow - television news correspondent
- Jason Katims - television writer and producer
- Carole King - songwriter and recording artist
- Richard Kline - played "Larry Dallas" on Three's Company
- Carol Leifer - stand-up comedian, writer, actress and producer
- Bob Linden - host and producer of Go Vegan Radio
- Hal Linden - actor, producer, and musician
- Clair Marlo - composer, singer, record producer, songwriter; attended 1976–1977, then went to Berklee College of Music
- Perri Pierre - actor and film producer
- DJ Rekha - DJ, producer, educator of South Asian music
- Ray Romano - actor, comedian (attended 1975–1978; dropped out after accumulating only 15 credits in three years, but returned later, during which he made the dean's list)
- Howie Rose - sportscaster for the New York Mets and New York Islanders
- Neil Rosen - Emmy award-winning movie critic, NY1
- Michael Savage (formerly known as Michael Weiner) - radio talk show personality and author
- Nancy Savoca - screenwriter, film director and producer
- Jerry Seinfeld - comedian
- Nestor Serrano - actor
- Paul Simon - singer, songwriter, musician, and member of Simon and Garfunkel
- Michael Stewart - playwright
- Bobby Susser - songwriter, record producer, and performer
- Lorenzo Thomas - poet
- Mal Waldron - jazz pianist
- Dorothy Wiggins (born 1925), socialite and social media personality.
- Dennis Wolfberg - comedian
- Marv Wolfman - comic book and animation writer
- Jay Wolpert - television producer, screenwriter
- Ben Younger - screenwriter and director
- Karen Yu (born 1992) - professional wrestler, also known as "Karen Q" and "Wendy Choo".

== Fictional characters ==
- George Costanza - from Seinfeld
- Carrie Heffernan - took courses for law during season 3 of King of Queens
- Eric Murphy - from Entourage; attended for two years before dropping out to become the manager of Vincent Chase
- Jerry Seinfeld - from Seinfeld
- Elliot Stabler - from Law & Order: SVU; first mentioned in S1E6
- Betty Suarez - from Ugly Betty; graduated in 2005 with a BFA in Media

== Government and politics ==
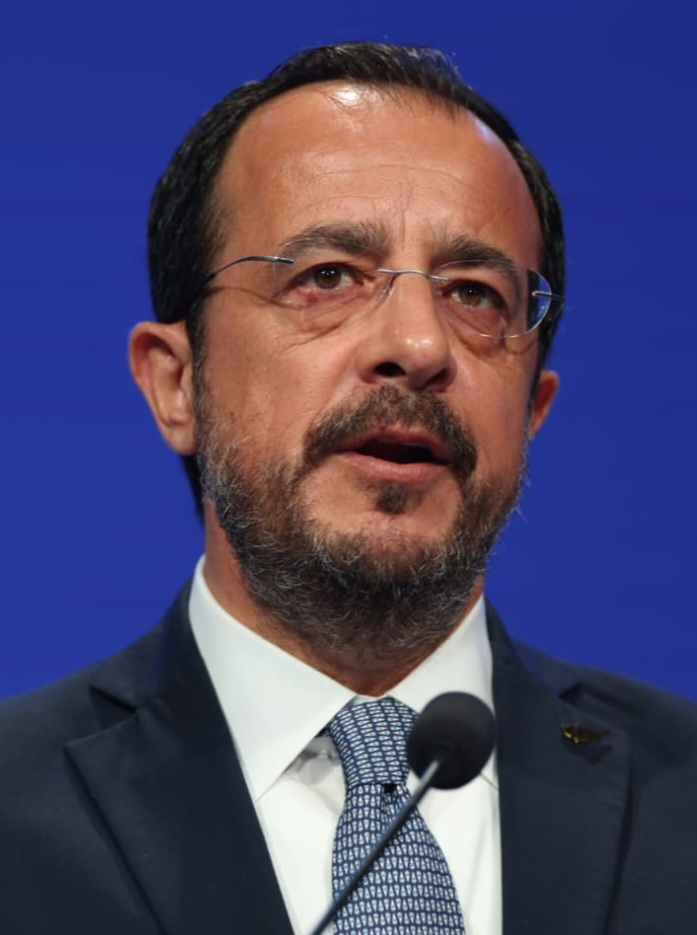
Nikos Christodoulides

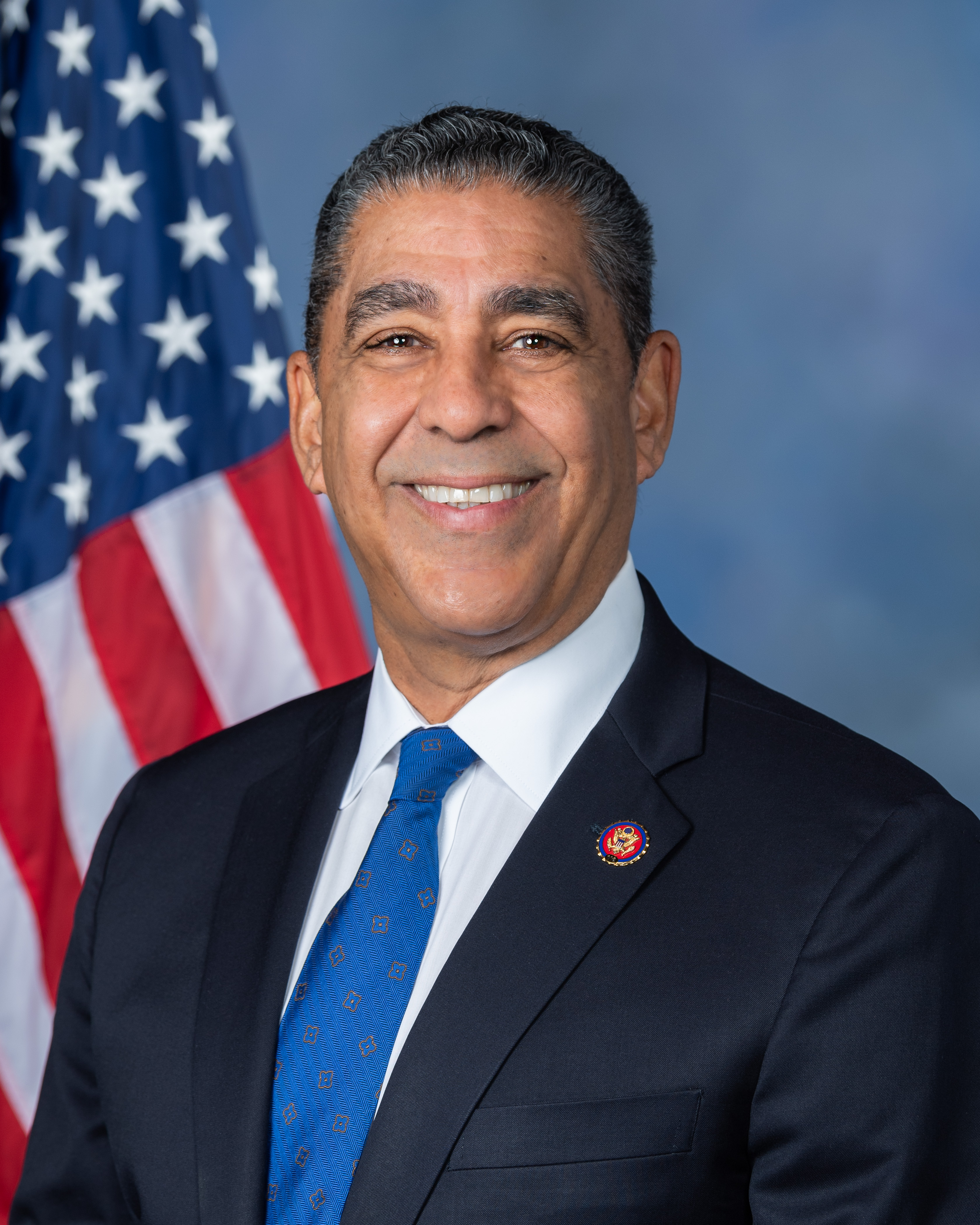
Adriano Espaillat

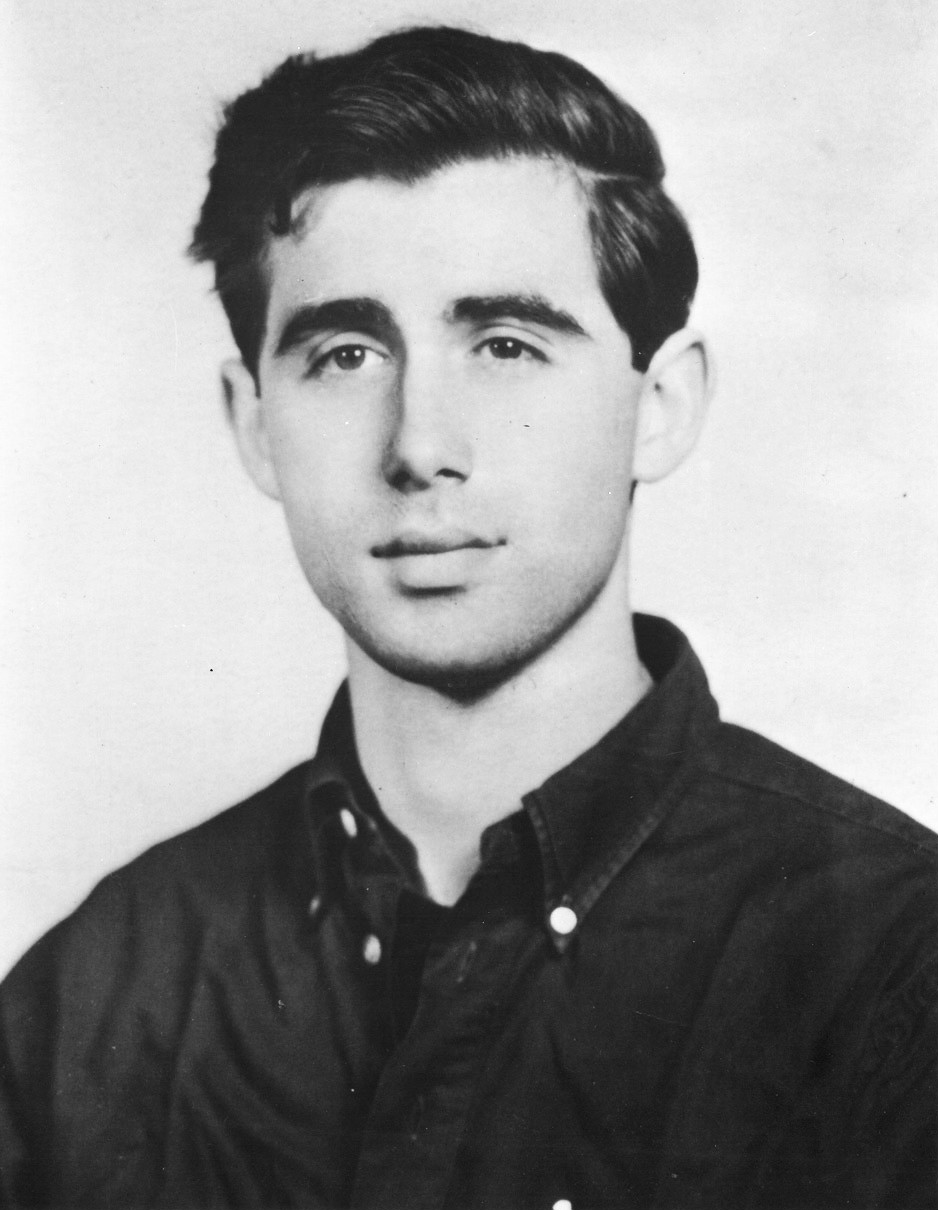
Andrew Goodman

- Gary Ackerman - United States representative from New York (1983–2013)
- Joel Benenson - Democratic pollster, chief political consultant for Hillary Clinton presidential campaign, 2016
- Avi Berkowitz - attorney and political adviser
- Shifra Bronznick - prominent Jewish women's rights activist
- Kema Chikwe - National Women Leader of the Nigerian political party PDP, former aviation minister
- Nikos Christodoulides - president of Cyprus (2023–present)
- Anthony Como - former NYC council member
- Costa Constantinides - nonprofit leader, former NYC council member, Queens College professor
- Joseph Crowley - former United States representative from New York's 7th congressional district (1999–2019), former Queens County Democratic chairman
- Mark Danish - former member, Florida House of Representatives
- Adriano Espaillat - United States representative from New York's 13th congressional district (2017–present), former member of the New York State Senate and New York State Assembly
- Rafael Espinal - executive director of Freelancers Union; former NYC council member
- Arthur J. Finkelstein - GOP political consultant
- Steven W. Fisher - former New York state justice, attorney in Wendy's massacre
- Marvin E. Frankel - litigator, judge, legal scholar, and human rights activist
- Helen W. Gillmor - U.S. federal judge
- Deborah J. Glick - NY state assemblywoman
- Mark M. Goldblatt - political commentator
- Andrew Goodman - civil rights worker, murdered by members of the Ku Klux Klan in Mississippi at the age of 20 as he sought to register African Americans to vote in Mississippi during Freedom Summer of 1964, while he was still a student
- Dan Halloran - former NYC council member, Theodist
- Julia Harrison - NYC council member
- Alan Hevesi - former New York state comptroller, former New York state assemblyman, former Queens College professor
- Andrew Hevesi - New Yorks State assemblyman
- Dov Hikind - former New York state assemblyman
- Blaise Ingoglia - Florida state assembly
- Dennis G. Jacobs - chief judge of the United States Court of Appeals for the Second Circuit
- Shabbos Kestenbaum - Jewish activist
- Jeffrey D. Klein - former New York state senator
- Alan P. Krasnoff - former Chesapeake, Virginia mayor
- Rory I. Lancman - former NYC council member and former New York state assemblyman
- Nathan Leventhal - former NYC deputy mayor, former president, Lincoln Center
- Helen Marshall - former Queens borough president
- Nettie Mayersohn - former member of New York State Assembly
- Joseph McGoldrick (1901–1978) - former NYC comptroller and NY state residential rent control commissioner, lawyer, and professor at Queens College
- Hiram Monserrate - former New York state senator
- Diane Patrick (B.A. 1972) - labor lawyer and former First Lady of Massachusetts (2007–2015)
- Jose Peralta - former New York state assemblyman and New York state senator
- Sylvia Pressler - former judge
- Mario Savio (B.A. 1963) - leader of the Free Speech Movement at the University of California, Berkeley in the 1960s; during an era of de jure segregation and violence against Civil Rights activists, he registered African Americans living in Mississippi to vote
- Ronald Spadafora - former FDNY chief and supervisor of September 11 rescue and recovery efforts
- Toby Ann Stavisky - New York state senator
- James Vacca - former NYC council member and Queens College professor
- Jeffrey White - former North California district judge

== Humanities ==
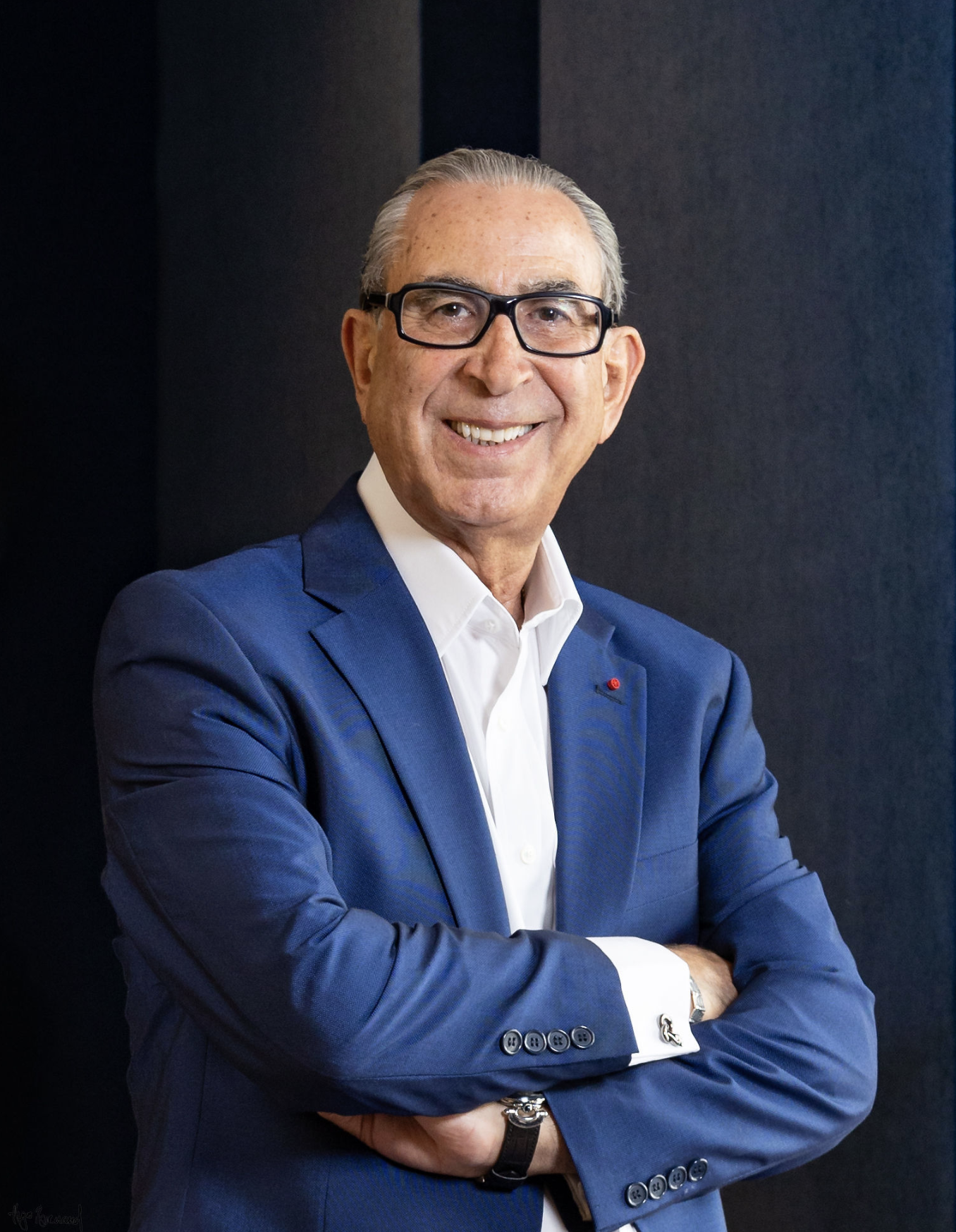
Nasser Khalili

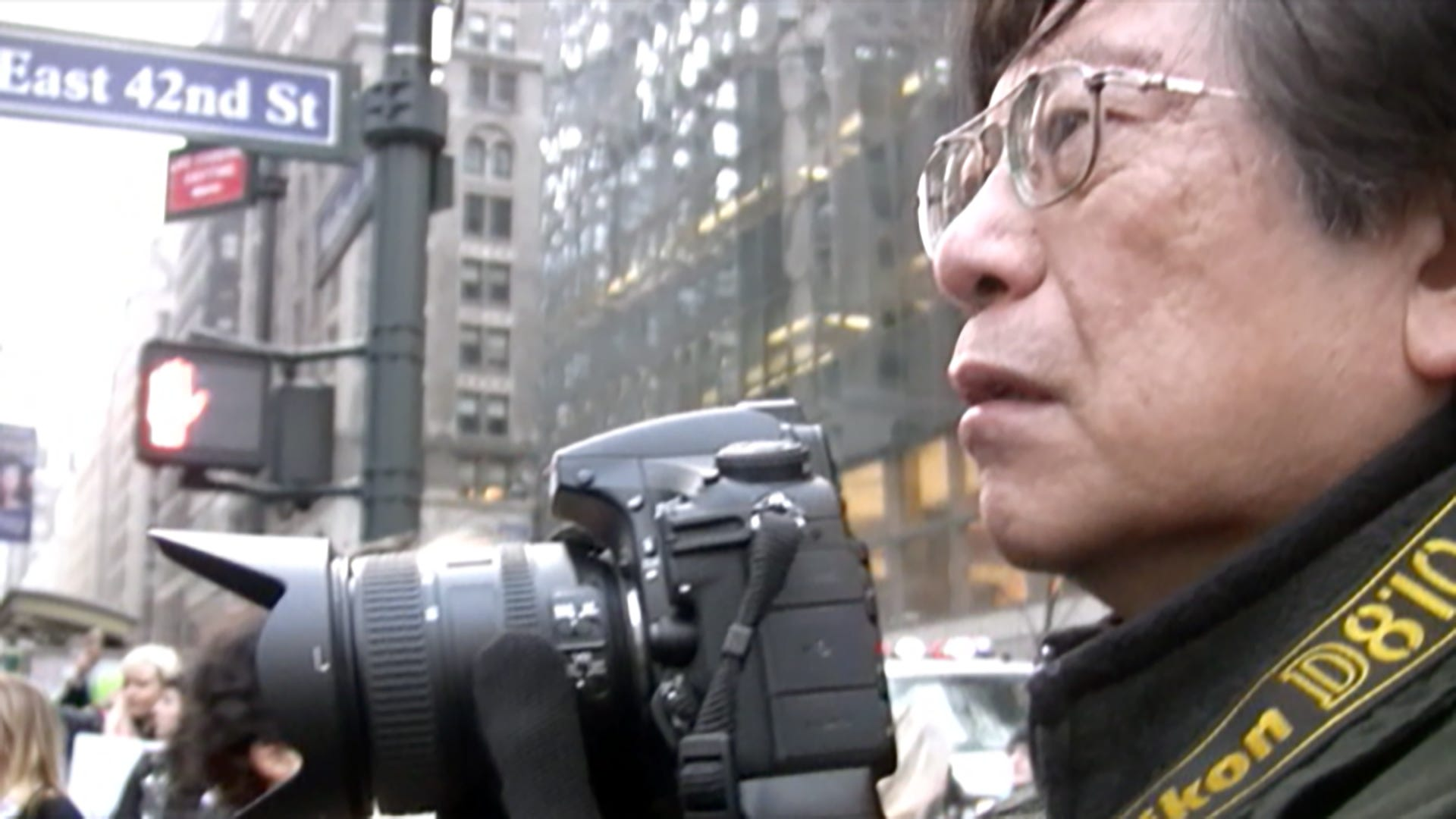
Corky Lee

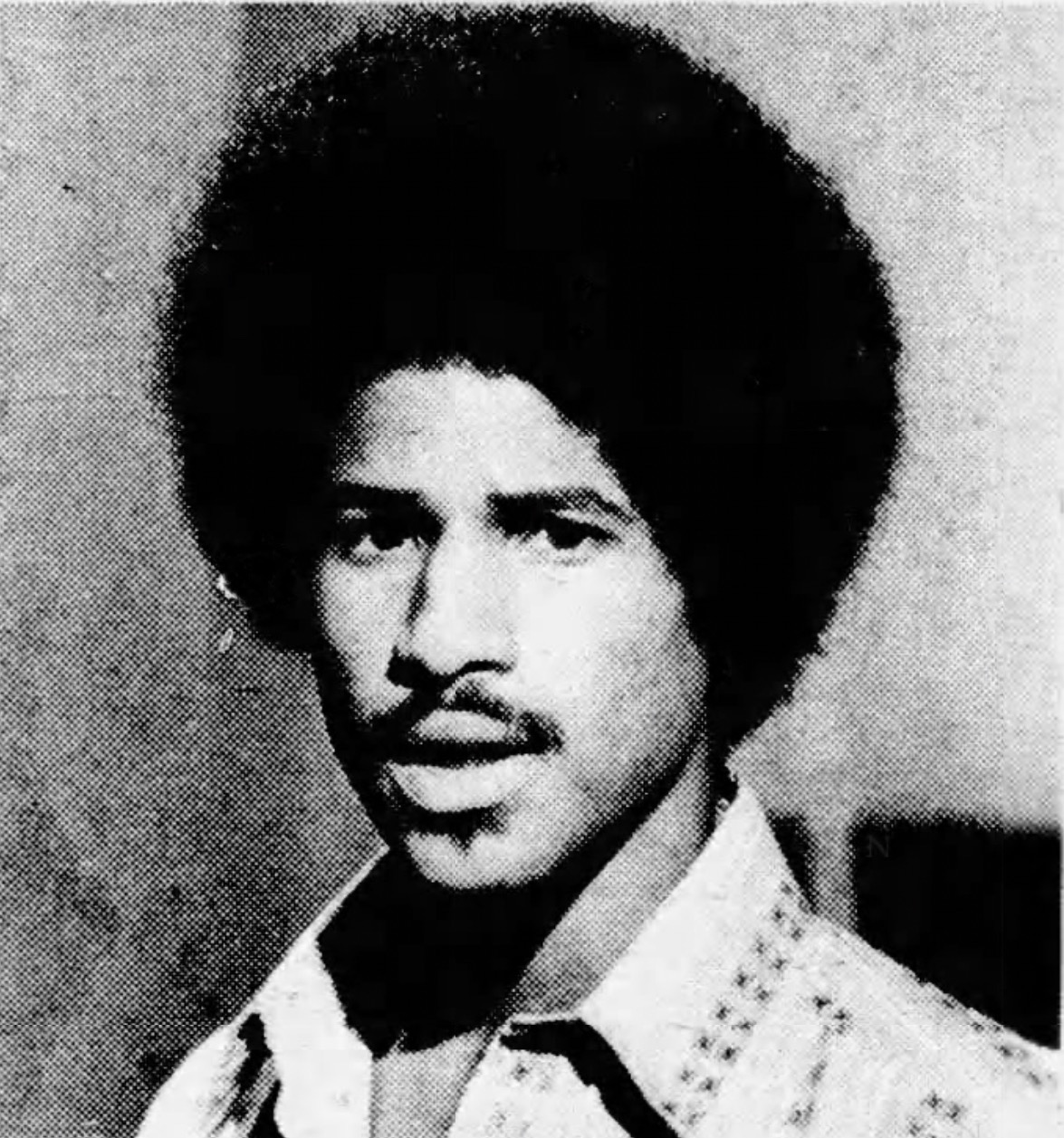
Felipe Luciano

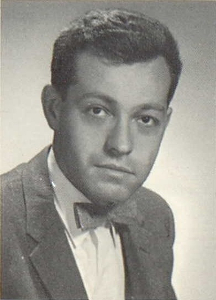
Herbert Parmet

- David A. Adler - author
- Yitzchok Adlerstein - rabbi, writer
- Mel Alexenberg - science artist and art educator
- Shalom Auslander - novelist, memoirist, and essayist
- Toni Cade Bambara - author, activist
- Nino Lo Bello - journalist
- Michael Berenbaum - scholar, writer, rabbi
- Ann Birstein - memoirist, Fulbright Scholar
- Erika Bourguignon - anthropologist
- Robert Boyers - literary essayist, cultural critic and memoirist
- Alex Caldiero - poet, scholar of humanities
- Vévé Amasasa Clark - scholar of African American Studies
- Marylyn Dintenfass - painter
- Alan Dugan - poet
- Yael Eckstein - religious activist
- Marc Estrin - political writer
- Jeff Faux - founder of Economic Policy Institute
- Bella Feldman - sculpting innovator
- Marie Ferrarella - romance writer
- Juan Flores - scholar of Latino Studies
- Ellen G. Friedman - author, women's studies
- Ruth Gay - writer about Jewish life
- Jeff Gomez - writer and transmedia producer
- Martin Gottlieb - editor at New York Times
- Robert Hessen - economist, historian
- Cynthia Holz - correspondent and author
- Harold Holzer - scholar of Abraham Lincoln and the political culture of the American Civil War Era
- Johanna Hurwitz - children's author
- Jane Irish - ceramicist
- Susan Isaacs - author, essayist, screenwriter
- Bernard Kalb - journalist, media critic, author
- Marvin Kalb - journalist
- Nasser Khalili - scholar, philanthropist
- Bernard Krisher - journalist
- Corky Lee - journalistic photographer
- Judith Lorber - sociologist
- Felipe Luciano - journalist
- Irving Malin - literary critic
- Nellie Y. McKay - scholar and co-editor of Norton Anthology of African-American Literature
- Samuel Menashe - poet, biochemist, veteran
- Bruce Bueno de Mesquita - political scientist
- Cristina Jiménez Moreta (B.A. 2007) - Ecuadoran immigration activist who co-founded United We Dream
- Joan Nestle - author
- Richard Ofshe - sociologist
- Jim Osman - sculptor
- Claude V. Palisca - professor of music history
- Herbert S Parmet - distinguished historian and political author
- Irene Peslikis - feminist artist
- Mark Podwal - artist, author, filmmaker, and physician
- Shana Poplack - linguistics
- Lina Puerta - artist
- Dorothy Rabinowitz - awarded 2001 Pulitzer Prize for Commentary
- Colleen Randall - abstract painter
- Marcia Resnick - photographer
- Robert Rosenblum - art historian, curator, writer
- John Rowan - Vietnam veteran
- Arlene Rush - artist and sculptor
- Lloyd Schwartz - Pulitzer Prize winner in Journalism
- Joel Shatzky (1943–2020) - writer and literary professor
- Lowery Stokes Sims - former curator at Museum of Arts and Design
- Marilyn Singer - children's author
- Arnold Skemer - novelist and publisher
- Elliot Sperling - expert on Tibet
- Linda Stein - sculptor, feminist (interviewed in Borat)
- Amin Tarzi - Middle East Studies
- Rosalyn Terborg-Penn - historian
- Eric Wolf - anthropologist

== Music ==
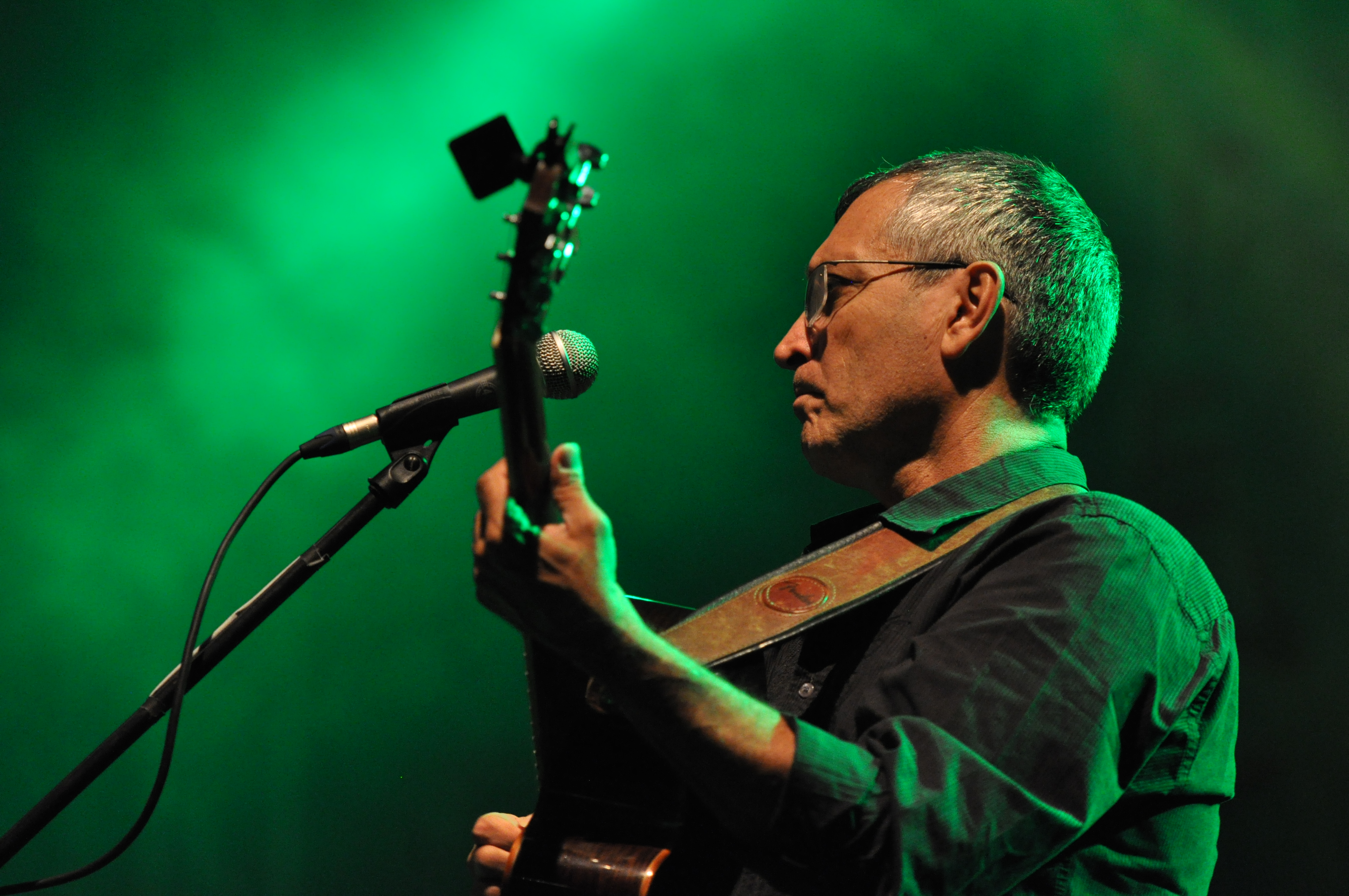
Gil Dor

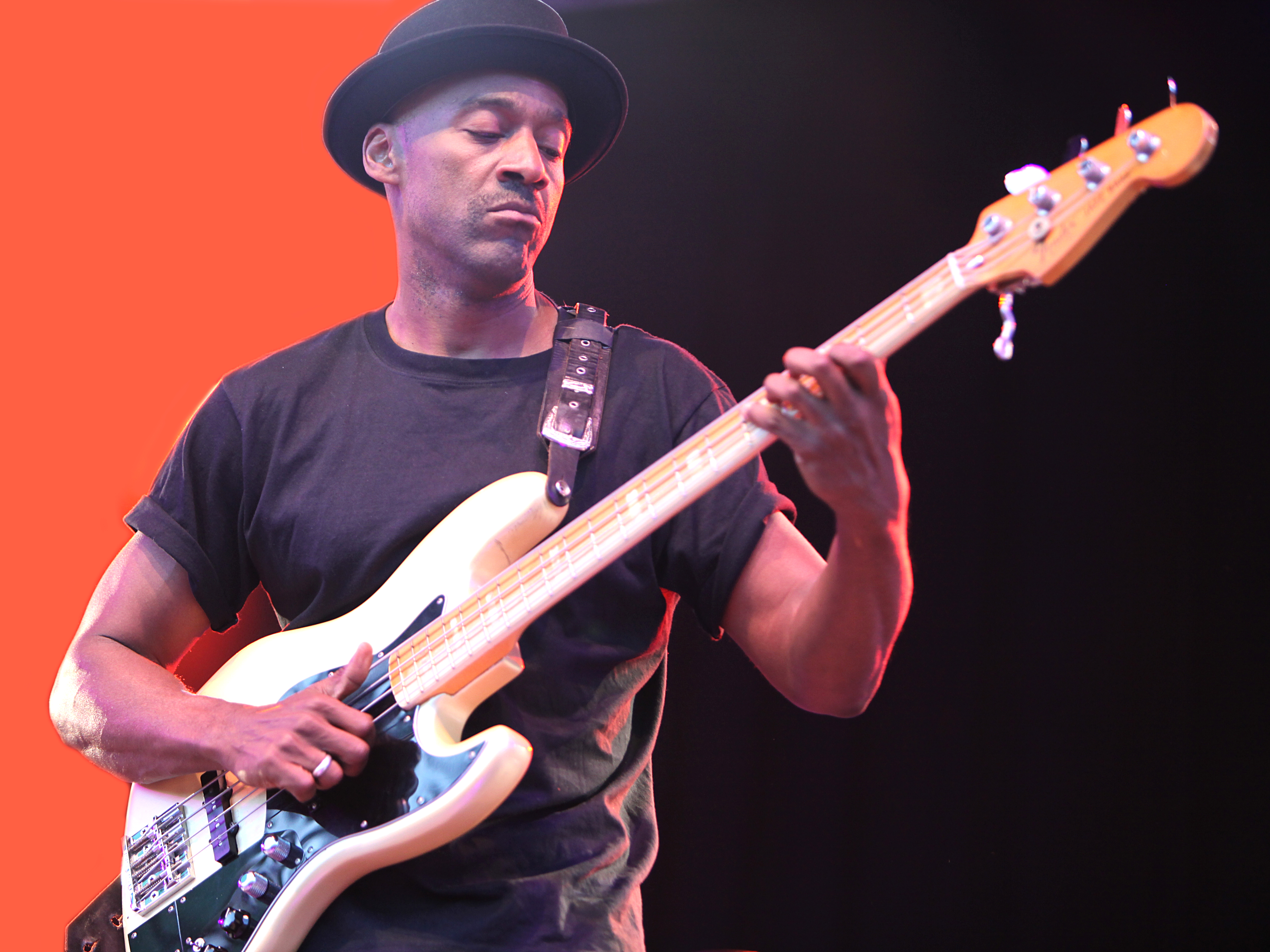
Marcus Miller

- Salman Ahmad - musician, Junoon
- Sol Berkowitz - composer and music educator
- Peter Calandra - pianist and composer
- Noel DaCosta - Nigerian-Jamaican jazz musician, composer
- Tina Chancey - multi-instrumentalist
- Gil Dor - Israeli guitar player
- Leslie Dunner - composer and conductor
- JoAnn Falletta - classical musician and orchestral conductor
- John Feeley - Irish classical guitarist
- Ellie Greenwich - singer, songwriter and producer
- Reri Grist - coloratura soprano
- Herbert Grossman - conductor
- Lisa Gutkin - Grammy-winning violinist
- Edward W. Hardy - composer, violinist
- Antonio Hart - jazz musician
- Conrad Herwig - jazz trombonist
- Douglas Knehans - composer
- Leo Kraft - composer
- Meyer Kupferman - composer and clarinetist
- Paul Lansky - pioneer computer musician and composer at Princeton
- Carolyn Leigh - lyricist, composer
- Mimi Lerner - opera singer
- Lewis Lockwood - musicologist
- Frank Lopardo - operatic tenor
- Marcus Miller - jazz composer
- Tito Munoz - conductor
- Arturo O'Farrill - jazz musician
- Marco Oppedisano - guitarist and composer
- Lou Pearlman - music producer
- Luis Perdomo - pianist
- Raoul Pleskow - composer
- Nancy B. Reich - musicologist
- James Nyoraku Schlefer - composer of Shakuhachi
- Paul Simon - composer, singer, musician, and member of Simon and Garfunkel
- Erika Sunnegårdh - Swedish operatic soprano
- George Tsontakis - composer and conductor
- William Westney - classical pianist
- Davide Zannoni - classical music composer

== Science and technology ==
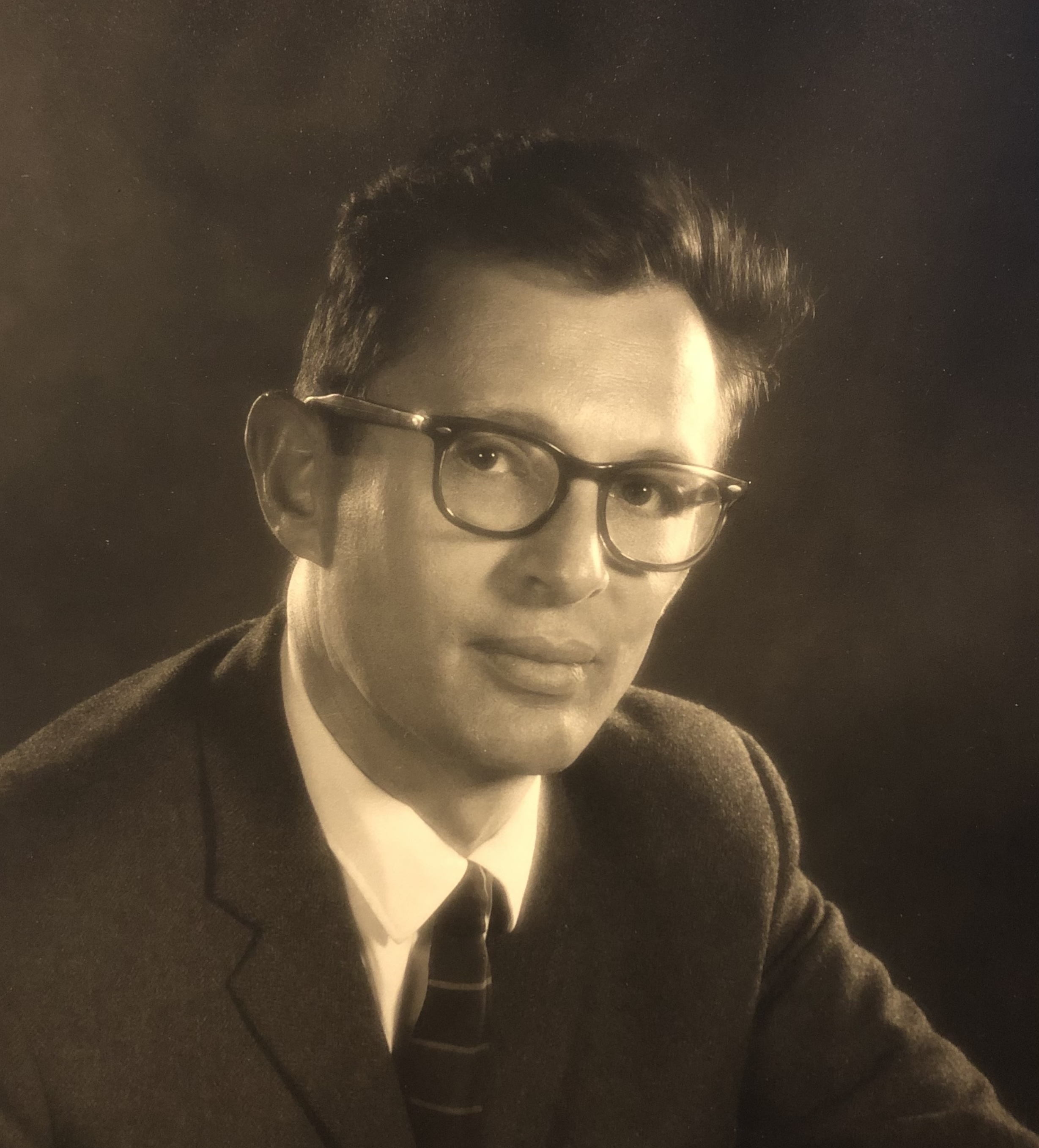
Kenneth Appel

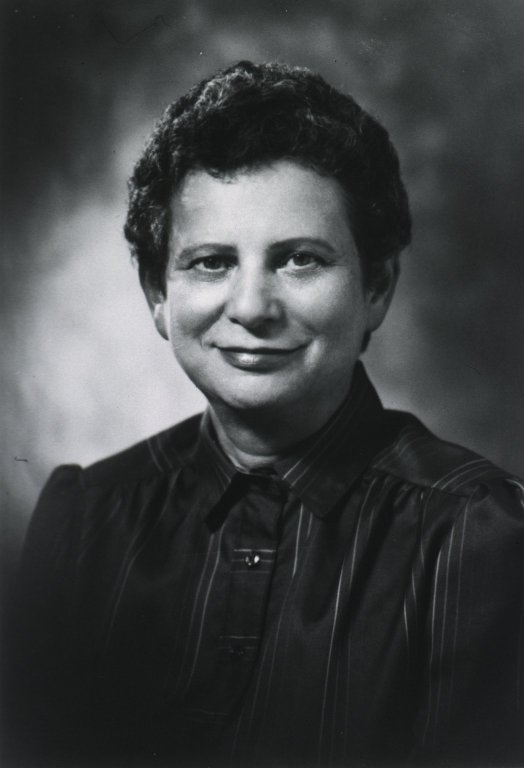
Elizabeth F. Neufeld

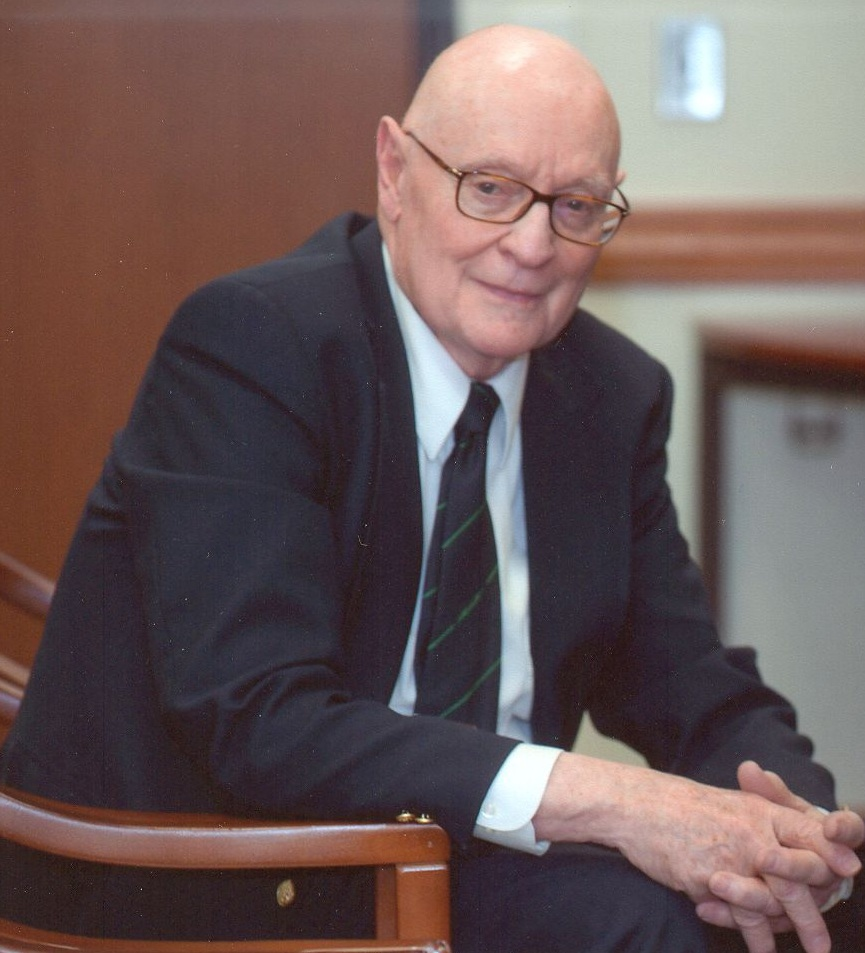
Nicholas Rescher

- Kenneth Appel - mathematician, proved four color theorem
- Boris Aronov - computer scientist (computational geometry)
- Inge Auerbacher - chemist, author, playwright, Holocaust survivor
- Steven J. Burakoff - cancer specialist; author of Therapeutic Immunology (2001) and Graft-Vs.-Host Disease: Immunology, Pathophysiology, and Treatment (1990)
- Anne Carter - technology economist
- Arturo Casadevall - molecular microbiologist
- Marie Maynard Daly - biochemist, first African-American woman to earn a Phd in chemistry
- Celso-Ramón García - obstetrician and gynecologist
- Edgar Gilbert - coding theorist
- David Gries - computer scientist
- Mohammad Salman Hamdani - biochemist, cited in the Patriot Act for heroism on 9/11
- Michael Hecht - researcher
- Ira B. Lamster - periodontist and professor of health management
- Richard Laub - paleontologist
- Jerry Lawson - electronic engineer
- Stanley Milgram - psychologist
- Robert Moog - inventor of the Moog synthesizer
- Howard Moskowitz - market researcher and psychophysicist
- Elizabeth F. Neufeld - geneticist
- Nicholas Rescher - philosopher
- Bernard Salick - entrepreneur, researcher, nephrologist
- Elissa Shevinsky - entrepreneur, information security researcher, feminist
- Russell Targ - physicist
- Alexander L. Wolf - computer scientist, president of Association for Computing Machinery
- Aaron D. Wyner - information theorist noted for his contributions in coding theory
- Bruce M. Zagelbaum - physician and researcher in sports ophthalmology

== Sports ==
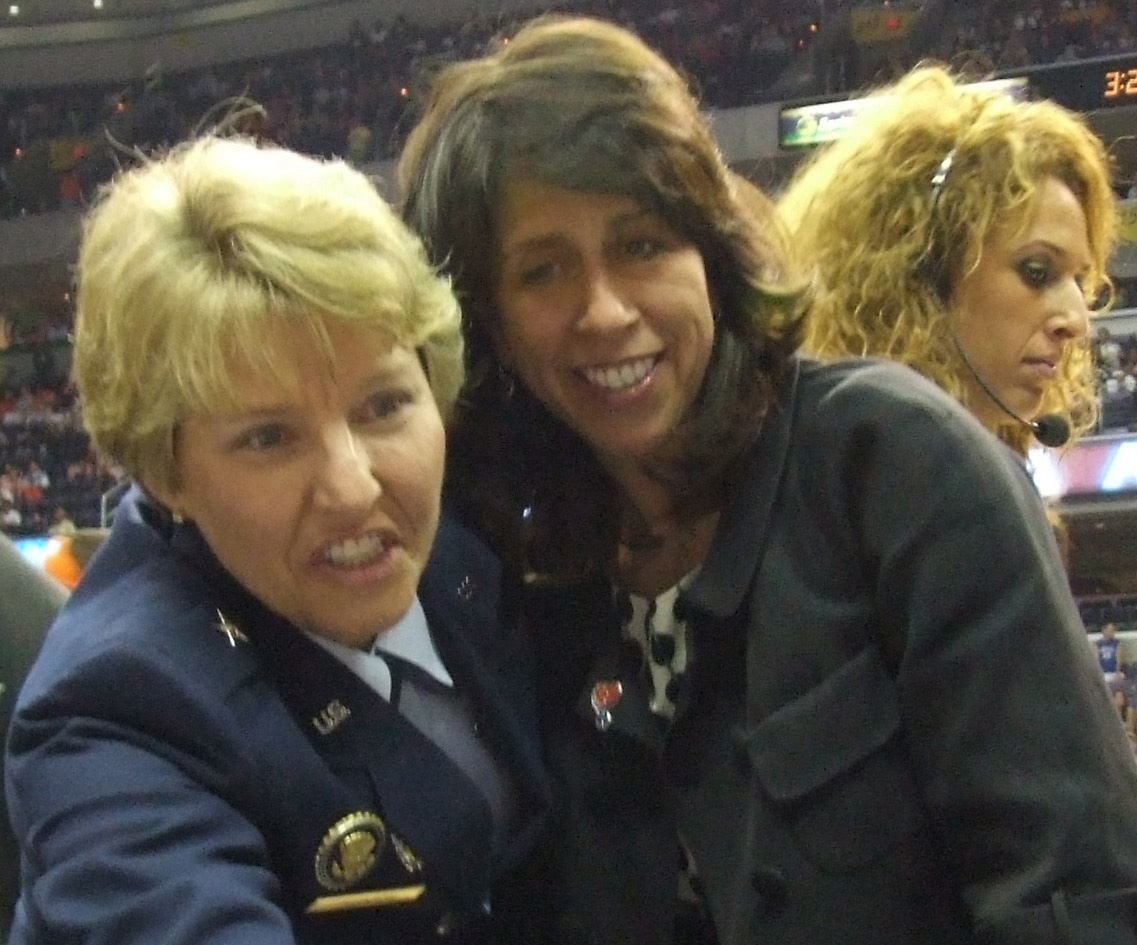
Donna Orender, center.

- Marilyn Aschner (born 1948) - professional tennis player
- Jane Bartkowicz - tennis player
- Glenn Braica - men's basketball coach
- Charlie Hoefer - basketball player
- Gail Marquis - basketball player
- Tre McLean (born 1993) - basketball player in the Israeli Basketball Premier League
- Donna Orender (née Geils; born 1957) - Women's Pro Basketball League All-Star & former WNBA president
- Diana Redman (born 1984) - Israeli soccer player
- Norm Roberts - assistant men's basketball coach at Kansas

== Notable faculty ==
Famous faculty at Queens College have included:

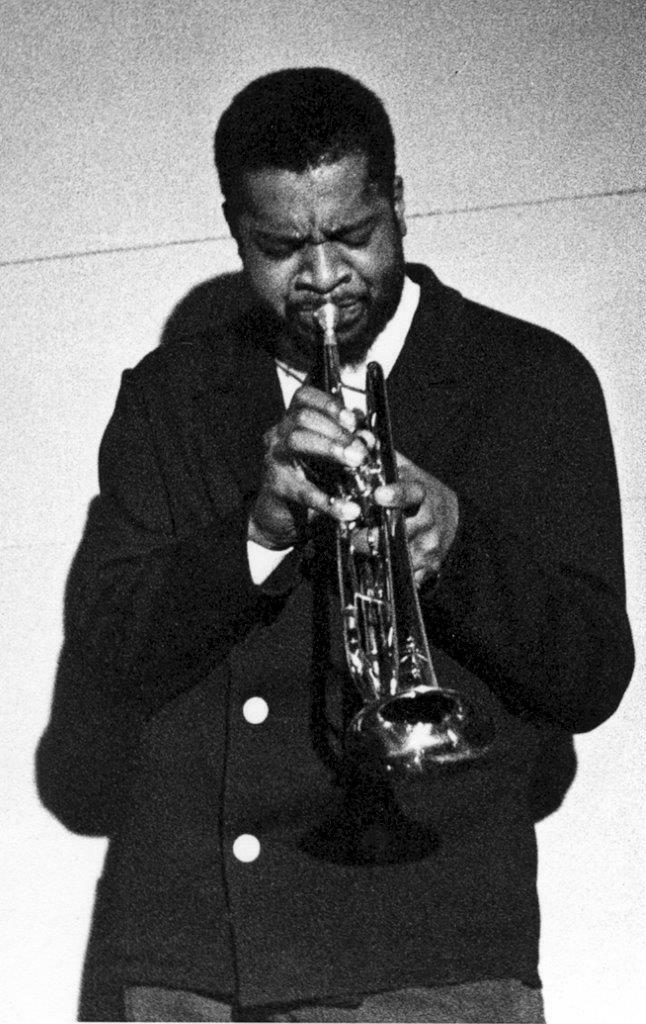
Donald Byrd

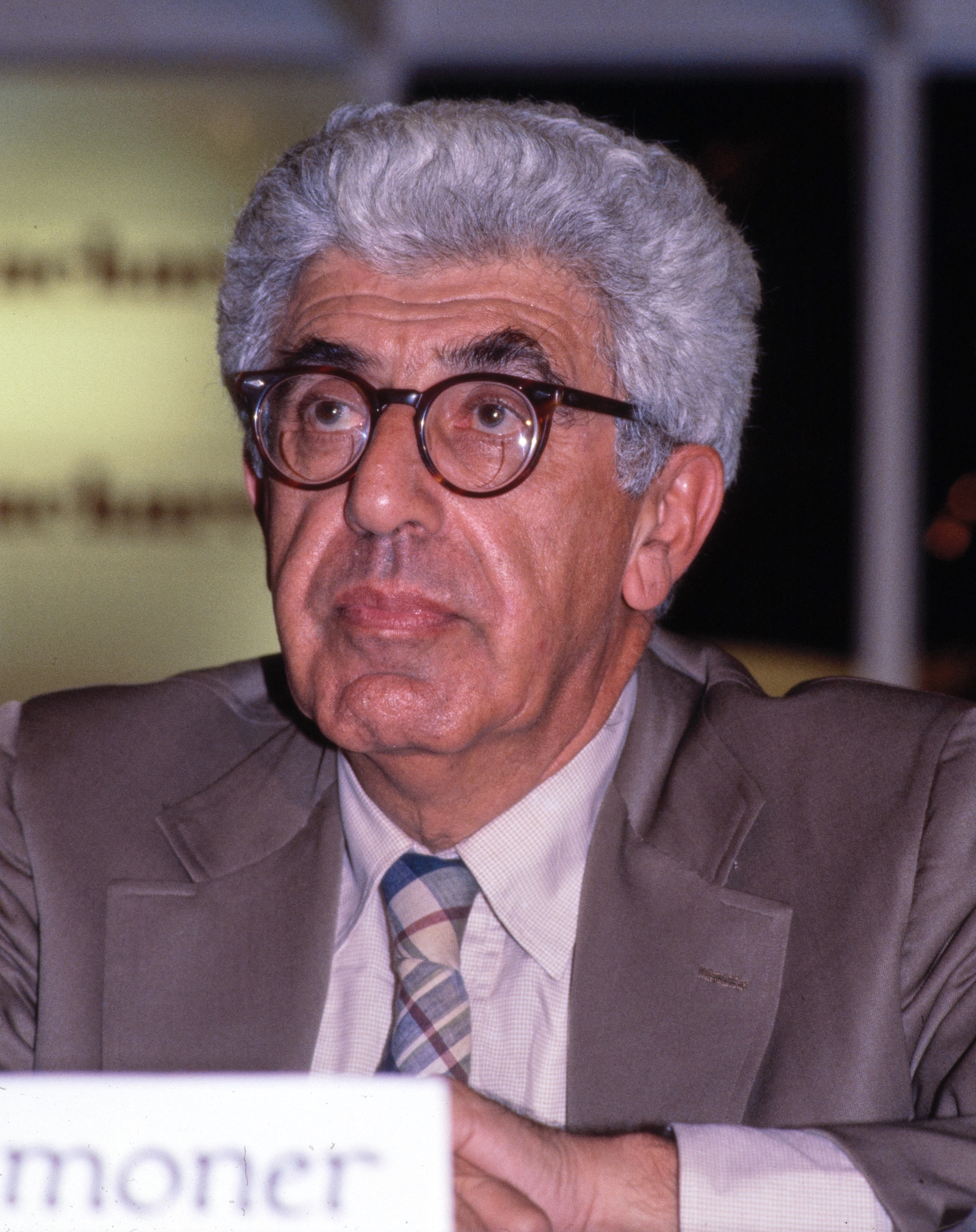
Barry Commoner

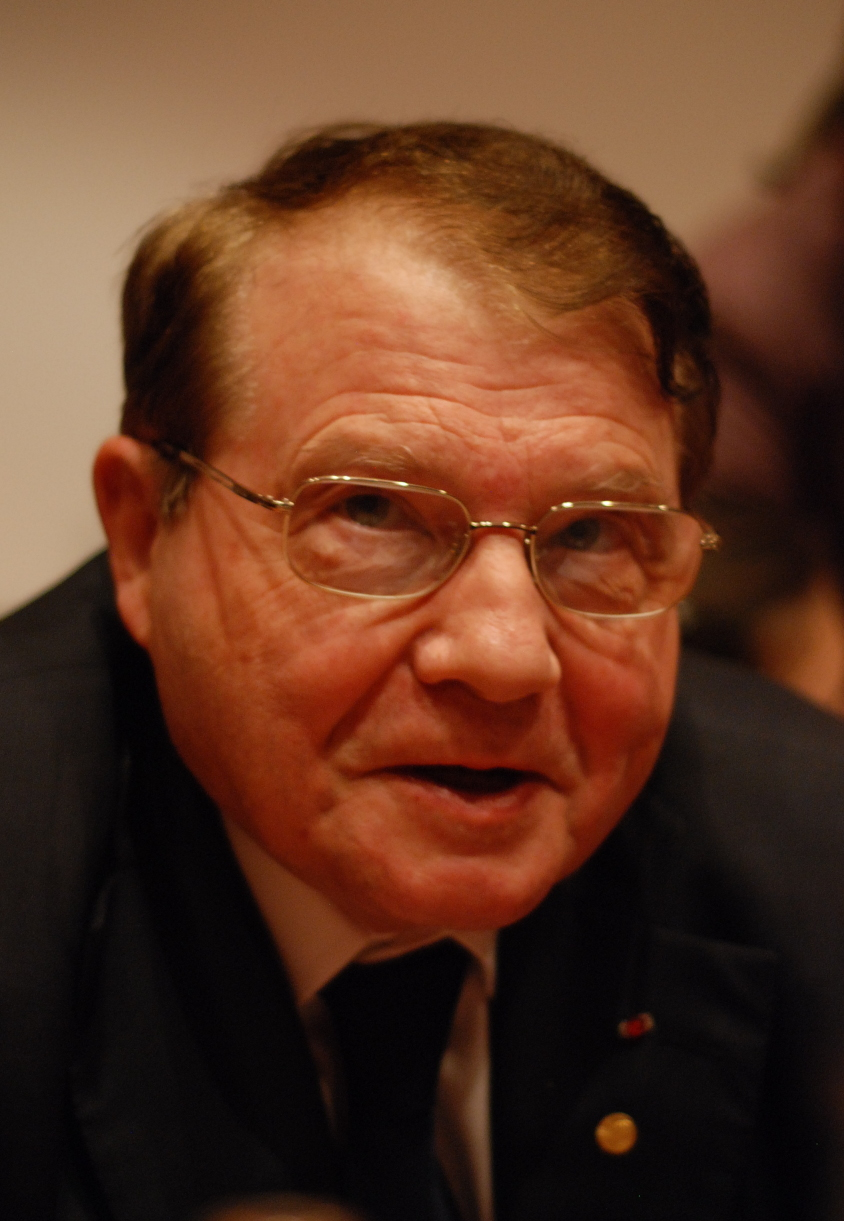
Luc Montagnier

- Salman Ahmad - musician with the band Junoon
- Ammiel Alcalay - poet, scholar, critic, translator, and prose stylist
- Benny Andrews - artist
- Paul Avrich - historian
- Rosemarie Beck - artist
- Ben-Zion Bokser - Conservative rabbi
- Donald Byrd - jazz musician
- Elliott Carter - composer
- Nancy Cohen - sculptor and papermaker
- Barry Commoner - biologist
- Costa Constantinides - political scientist and urban expert
- Luigi Dallapiccola - Italian composer
- Bogdan Denitch - sociologist
- Joshua Freeman - historian
- Azriel Genack - physicist
- Susanna Grannis - outspoken academic on helping minority students and students with disabilities gain access to education
- Andrew Hacker - political scientist
- Michael Harrington - political philosopher
- Samuel Heilman - sociologist
- Banesh Hoffmann - British mathematician, worked with Albert Einstein
- Melinda Katz (born 1965), Queens County District Attorney, 19th Borough President of Queens, Member of the New York City Council, and Member of the New York State Assembly
- Chin Kim - violinist
- John Frederick Lange, Jr. - author
- Mieczysław Maneli - Polish philosopher and diplomat
- Joseph McElroy - author
- Elliott Mendelson - mathematician
- Edwin E. Moise - mathematician
- Luc Montagnier - French virologist, winner of the 2008 Nobel Prize in Physiology or Medicine for his discovery of the human immunodeficiency virus (HIV) (endowed professorship, 1997/8–2001)
- Thea Musgrave - Scottish composer
- Marco Oppedisano - composer
- Arbie Orenstein - musicologist, author, and pianist
- George Perle - composer
- Koppel Pinson - historian
- Hortense Powdermaker - anthropologist
- Gregory Rabassa - literary translator
- Stefan Ralescu - mathematician
- Karol Rathaus - German-Austrian composer
- Charles Repole - actor, theater director
- Reynold Ruffins - visual artist and professor emeritus
- Douglas Rushkoff - media expert and futurologist
- Roger Sanjek - anthropologist
- Arthur Sard - mathematician
- Bruce Saylor - composer
- Carl Schachter - musician
- Dennis Sullivan - mathematician
- David Syrett - naval historian
- Harold Syrett (1913–1984) - president of Brooklyn College
- John Tytell - author
- James Vacca - urban expert
- Robert Ward - composer
- Yevgeny Yevtushenko - Soviet and Russian poet
- Roby Young - Israeli soccer player
- Paul Zweig - poet, memoirist, and critic known for his study on Walt Whitman
