= Rakowitz =

Rakowitz is a Germanized Slavic habitational surname. Notable people with the name include:

- Cindy Rakowitz, American executive
- Daniel Rakowitz (born 1960), American murderer and cannibal
- Michael Rakowitz (born 1973), Iraqi-American artist
- Stefan Rakowitz (born 1990), Austrian footballer

== See also ==
- Battle of Rakowitz, a name for the Battle of Warsaw (1705)
