= Walter Hoffman =

Walter Hoffman may refer to:

- Walter Edward Hoffman, U.S. federal judge
- Nino Lo Bello, writer who used the pseudonym Walter Hoffman
