= Political machine =

Type of political group

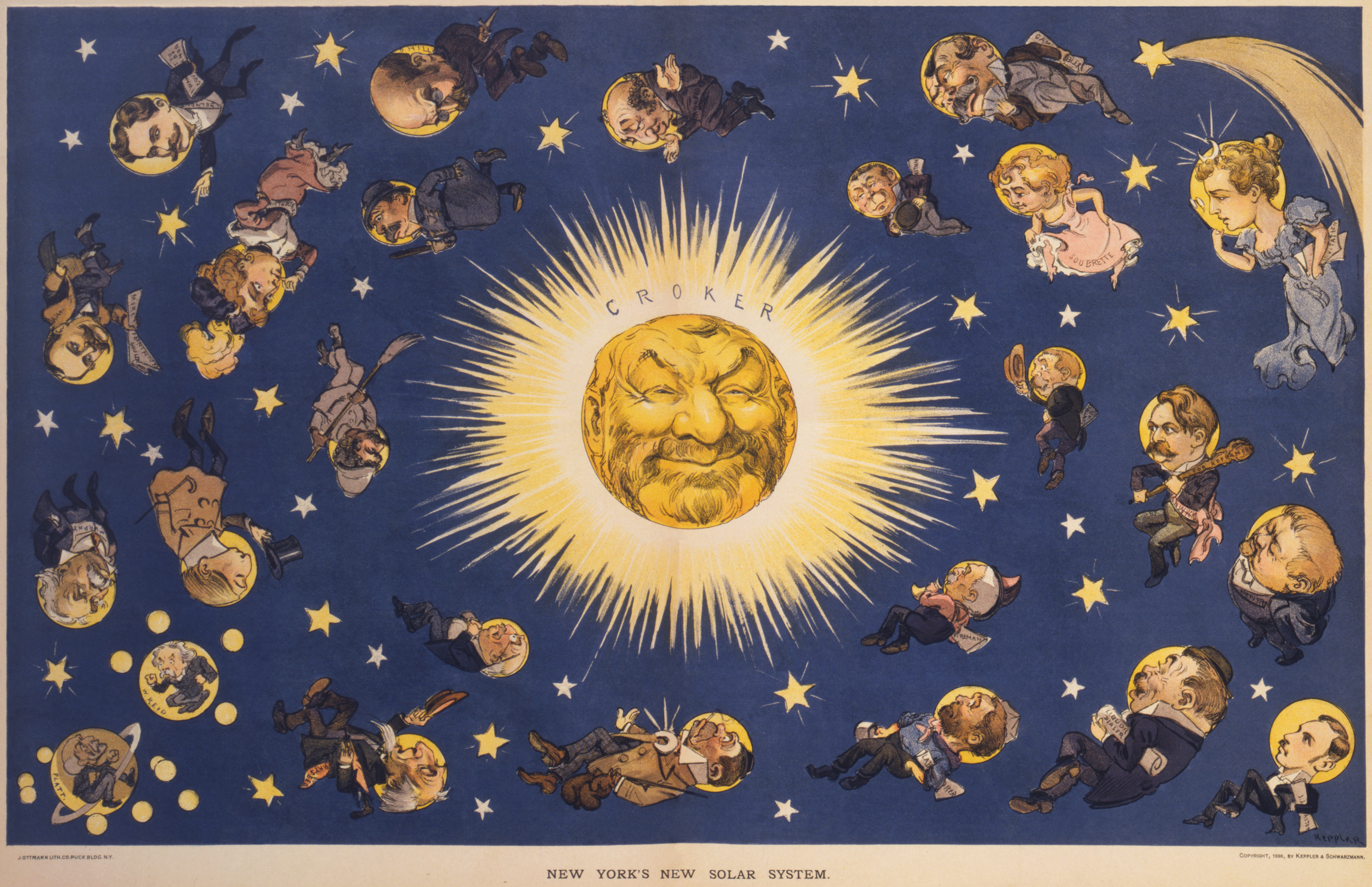
In this 1889 Udo Keppler cartoon from Puck, all of New York City politics revolves around boss Richard Croker.

In the politics of representative democracies, a political machine is a party organization that recruits its members by the use of tangible incentives (such as money or political jobs) and that is characterized by a high degree of leadership control over member activity. The machine's power is based on the ability of the boss or group to get out the vote for their candidates on election day.

While these elements are common to most political parties and organizations, they are essential to political machines, which rely on hierarchy and rewards for political power, often enforced by a strong party whip structure. Machines sometimes have a political boss, typically rely on patronage, the spoils system, "behind-the-scenes" control, and longstanding political ties within the structure of a representative democracy. Machines typically are organized on a permanent basis instead of a single election or event. The terms "machine" and "boss" are usually used by its reform-minded enemies in a pejorative sense, especially during the 19th century. However, in the 20th century these became standard terms for scholars and analysts who sometimes emphasized their positive contributions.

== Definition ==
The Encyclopædia Britannica defines "political machine" as "a party organization, headed by a single boss or small autocratic group, that commands enough votes to maintain political and administrative control of a city, county, or state". William Safire, in his Safire's Political Dictionary, defines "machine politics" as "the election of officials and the passage of legislation through the power of an organization created for political action". He notes that the term is generally considered pejorative, often implying corruption.

Hierarchy and discipline are hallmarks of political machines. "It generally means strict organization", according to Safire. Quoting Edward Flynn, a Bronx County Democratic leader who ran the borough from 1922 until his death in 1953, Safire wrote "the so-called 'independent' voter is foolish to assume that a political machine is run solely on good will, or patronage. For it is not only a machine; it is an army. And in any organization as in any army, there must be discipline."

Political patronage, while often associated with political machines, is not essential to the definition for either Safire or Britannica.

== Function ==
A political machine is a party organization that recruits its members by the use of tangible incentives—money, political jobs—and that is characterized by a high degree of leadership control over member activity.

Political machines started as grass roots organizations to gain the patronage needed to win the modern election. Having strong patronage, these "clubs" were the main driving force in gaining and getting out the "right party vote" in the election districts.

== In the history of the United States ==
The term political machine dates back to the 19th century in the United States, where such organizations have existed in some municipalities and states since the 18th century.

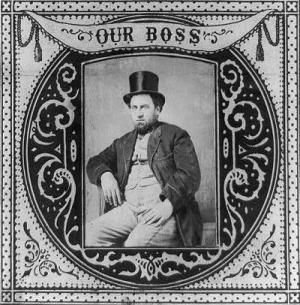
1869 tobacco label featuring William M. Tweed, 19th-century political boss of New York City

In the late 19th century, large cities in the United States—Boston, Chicago, Cleveland, Kansas City, New York City, Philadelphia, St. Louis, Memphis—were accused of using political machines. During this time "cities experienced rapid growth under inefficient government". Each city's machine lived under a hierarchical system with a "boss" who held the allegiance of local business leaders, elected officials and their appointees, and who knew the proverbial buttons to push to get things done. Benefits and problems both resulted from the rule of political machines.

This system of political control—known as "bossism"—emerged particularly in the Gilded Age. A single powerful figure (the boss) was at the center and was bound together to a complex organization of lesser figures (the political machine) by reciprocity in promoting financial and social self-interest. One of the most infamous of these political machines was Tammany Hall, the Democratic Party machine that played a major role in controlling New York City and New York politics and helping immigrants, most notably the Irish, rise up in American politics from the 1790s to the 1960s. From 1872, Tammany had an Irish "boss". However, Tammany Hall also served as an engine for graft and political corruption, perhaps most notoriously under William M. "Boss" Tweed in the mid-19th century.

Lord Bryce describes these political bosses saying:

An army led by a council seldom conquers: It must have a commander-in-chief, who settles disputes, decides in emergencies, inspires fear or attachment. The head of the Ring is such a commander. He dispenses places, rewards the loyal, punishes the mutinous, concocts schemes, negotiates treaties. He generally avoids publicity, preferring the substance to the pomp of power, and is all the more dangerous because he sits, like a spider, hidden in the midst of his web. He is a Boss.

When asked if he was a boss, James Pendergast said simply,

I've been called a boss. All there is to it is having friends, doing things for people, and then later on they'll do things for you ... You can't coerce people into doing things for you—you can't make them vote for you. I never coerced anybody in my life. Wherever you see a man bulldozing anybody he don't last long.

Theodore Roosevelt, before he became president in 1901, was deeply involved in New York City politics. He explains how the machine worked:

The organization of a party in our city is really much like that of an army. There is one great central boss, assisted by some trusted and able lieutenants; these communicate with the different district bosses, whom they alternately bully and assist. The district boss in turn has a number of half-subordinates, half-allies, under him; these latter choose the captains of the election districts, etc., and come into contact with the common heelers.

=== Voting strategy ===
Many machines formed in cities to serve immigrants to the U.S. in the late 19th century who viewed machines as a vehicle for political enfranchisement. Machine workers helped win elections by turning out large numbers of voters on election day. It was in the machine's interests to only maintain a minimally winning amount of support. Once they were in the majority and could count on a win, there was less need to recruit new members, as this only meant a thinner spread of the patronage rewards to be spread among the party members. As such, later-arriving immigrants, such as Jews, Italians, and other immigrants from Southern and Eastern Europe between the 1880s and 1910s, saw fewer rewards from the machine system than the well-established Irish. At the same time, the machines' staunchest opponents were members of the middle class, who were shocked at the malfeasance and did not need the financial help.

The corruption of urban politics in the United States was denounced by private citizens. They achieved national and state civil-service reform and worked to replace local patronage systems with civil service. By Theodore Roosevelt's time, the Progressive Era mobilized millions of private citizens to vote against the machines.

=== 1930s to 1970s ===
In the 1930s, James A. Farley was the chief dispenser of the Democratic Party's patronage system through the Post Office and the Works Progress Administration (WPA) which eventually nationalized many of the job benefits machines provided. The New Deal allowed machines to recruit for the WPA and Civilian Conservation Corps, making Farley's machine the most powerful. All patronage was screened through Farley, including presidential appointments. The New Deal machine fell apart after he left the administration over the third term issue in 1940. Those agencies were, for the most part, abolished in 1943, and the machines suddenly lost much of their patronage. The formerly poor immigrants who had benefited under Farley's national machine had become assimilated and prosperous, and no longer needed the informal or extralegal aides provided by machines. In the 1940s most of the big city machines collapsed, with the exception of Chicago.

A local political machine in Tennessee in the 1930s and 1940s was forcibly removed in what was known as the 1946 Battle of Athens.

Smaller communities such as Parma, Ohio, in the post–Cold War era under Prosecutor Bill Mason's "Good Old Boys" and especially communities in the Deep South, where small-town machine politics are relatively common, also feature what might be classified as political machines, although these organizations do not have the power and influence of the larger boss networks listed in this article. For example, the "Cracker Party" was a Democratic Party political machine that dominated city politics in Augusta, Georgia, for over half of the 20th century. Political machines also thrive on Native American reservations, where tribal sovereignty is used as a shield against federal and state laws against the practice.

In the 1960s and 1970s, Edward Costikyan, Ed Koch, Eleanor Roosevelt, and other reformers worked to do away with Tammany Hall of New York County. To a lesser degree, the Democratic Party machines in Kings, Bronx, and Queens counties continued until the end of the 1980s.

=== Historical machines ===
- New Deal coalition, United States 1930s–1960s
- The Byrd Organization, Virginia
- Tammany Hall
- Santa Fe Ring

== In Japan ==
Japan's Liberal Democratic Party is often cited as another political machine, maintaining power in suburban and rural areas through its control of farm bureaus and road construction agencies. In Japan, the word jiban (literally "base" or "foundation") is the word used for political machines. For decades, the LDP was able to dominate rural constituencies by spending heavily on rural areas, forming clientelist bonds with many groups and especially agriculture.

Japanese political factional leaders are expected to distribute mochidai (literally snack-money) funds to help subordinates win elections. For the annual end-year gift in 1989, LDP Party Headquarters gave $200,000 to every member of the Diet. Supporters collect benefits such as money payments distributed by politicians to voters in weddings, funerals, New year parties among other events, and ignore their patrons' wrongdoings in exchange. Political ties are held together by marriages between the families of elite politicians. Nisei, second generation political families, have grown increasingly numerous in Japanese politics, due to a combination of name-recognition, business contacts and financial resources, and the role of personal political machines.

== Evaluation ==
The phrase is considered derogatory "because it suggests that the interest of the organization are placed before those of the general public", according to Safire. Machines are criticized as undemocratic and inevitably encouraging corruption.

Since the 1960s, some historians have reevaluated political machines, considering them corrupt but efficient. Machines were undemocratic but responsive. They were also able to contain the spending demands of special interests. In Mayors and Money, a comparison of municipal government in Chicago and New York, Ester R. Fuchs credited the Cook County Democratic Organization with giving Mayor Richard J. Daley the political power to deny labor union contracts that the city could not afford and to make the state government assume burdensome costs like welfare and courts. Describing New York, Fuchs wrote, "New York got reform, but it never got good government." At the same time, as Dennis R. Judd and Todd Swanstrom suggest in City Politics that this view accompanied the common belief that there were no viable alternatives. They go on to point out that this is a falsehood, since there are certainly examples of reform oriented, anti-machine leaders during this time.

In his mid-2016 article "How American Politics Went Insane" in The Atlantic, Jonathan Rauch argued that the political machines of the past had flaws but provided better governance than the alternatives. He wrote that political machines created positive incentives for politicians to work together and compromise – as opposed to pursuing "naked self-interest" the whole time.

== See also ==
- Cronyism
- Clientelism
- Particracy
- Political boss
- Spoils system
