= Lamster =

Lamster is a surname. Notable people with the surname include:

- Ira B. Lamster, American periodontist
- Mark Lamster, American architecture writer and critic
