= TWRP =

TWRP may refer to:

- TWRP (band), a Canadian rock band formed in 2007, formerly known as Tupper Ware Remix Party
- TWRP (software), an open-source software custom recovery image for Android-based devices

== See also ==
- Twerp, a 2013 children's book by Mark M. Goldblatt
