= ZYX (magazine) =

American literary zine

Zyx (ISSN 1093-8621) is a literary newsletter, or zine, edited by Arnold Skemer and published regularly since 1990 by Phrygian Press in New York City. A typical issue will include an essay by the editor around the issues of literary careerism, followed by reviews of recent works of fiction and poetry, and finally several pages of excerpts from the reviewed titles and other books of (usually experimental) poetry and fiction.

Since its founding, the zine has itself been reviewed in a variety of media and has been lauded as a touchstone in criticism and dissemination of experimental literature. Some of these reviews have appeared in Taproot Reviews, Factsheet Five, New Hope International Review, and others.

Skemer is also the author of eight published novels, including an ambitious ongoing series where each title is a letter of the alphabet (C, D, H etc.).

== See also ==
- List of literary magazines
