= Stefan Ralescu =

Ştefan S. Ralescu (born March 27, 1952, in Bucharest, Romania) is a statistician who has made contributions to the theory of statistical inference, mainly through asymptotic theory. He is a professor of mathematics and statistics at Queens College of the City University of New York in New York City. He studied first at the University of Bucharest obtaining an MA in mathematics (1976). He came to Indiana University in 1977, completing his PhD in 1981 under the direction of Madan Lal Puri. Before moving to New York, Ralescu was an assistant professor in the Division of Applied Mathematics at Brown University (1981–1984).

His research themes are varied, and include the fields of asymptotic theory of perturbed empirical and quantile processes, nonparametric density estimation and Stein estimation (see James–Stein estimator), as well as work in collaboration with Dr. A. Cassvan in connection to techniques using brain auditory evoked potentials (BAEP).

He has published more than 70 research articles. He is an associate editor of Journal of Statistical Planning and Inference (JSPI) and International Journal of Statistics and Systems (IJSS). He was a former director of the mathematics section of the PSC-CUNY Research Foundation. He has an Erdős number of 2.

Ralescu is an Elected Fellow of the International Statistical Institute. He is listed in Marquis Who's Who in Science and Engineering (since 1995).

His hobbies include rare book collecting and bridge. A bridge champion in his native Romania in the early 1970s, Ştefan Ralescu has published many bridge articles that have appeared in The Bridge World, the ACBL Bulletin and Bridge Today, among other magazines.
