= Jeffrey Halperin =

Jeffrey Halperin is a psychology professor at Queens College, City University of New York (CUNY) and a neuropsychology doctoral faculty member at the CUNY Graduate Center since 1989.

== History ==
Halperin graduated with a Ph.D. in clinical psychology from the CUNY Graduate Center in 1979. In 1980, Halperin completed a postdoctoral fellowship in psychopharmacology at the Schering-Plough pharmaceutical corporation. Following graduation he worked as a research associate at the New York State Psychiatric Institute. In 1984, he pursued a job at the department of psychiatry at the Mount Sinai School of Medicine. There he served as director of child psychology from 1984 to 1989. Halperin maintains a part-time affiliation at Mount Sinai School of Medicine as the director of disruptive behavioral disorders research team, while currently working full-time as a psychology professor at Queens College and the CUNY Graduate Center. Halperin furthermore serves as the director of the development neuropsychology laboratory at Queens College.

Halperin is a member of the Child Psychopathology and Developmental Disabilities Study Section of the National Institutes of Health and serves as a frequent referee for academic and funding agencies around the world.

== Research activity ==
For the past three decades Halperin has been conducting neuroscientific research, focusing on neuropsychiatric disorders that emerge during childhood but persist throughout life. His approach to research includes integration of clinical, neuropsychological and neurobiological psychology. Halperin specifically focuses on attention deficit hyperactivity disorder (ADHD). Currently, he focuses on non-medical interventions for children that are at risk for developing ADHD. As of 2013, he has developed a project out of Queens College called TEAMS (Training Executive Attention and Motor Skills). This specific approach suggests that old fashion childhood games and playing with family can improve executive functioning, working memory, and self-control in children with ADHD. Part of his research includes applying neuroimaging procedures to observe brain functioning in children with maladaptive behaviors who do and do not persist into adulthood.

== Sources ==
- Ellison, K. (2013). Alternative Therapies: A Game-Changing Treatment for ADHD. Retrieved from http://www.nesca-news.com/2013/02/alternative-therapies-game-changing.html
- Psychology Department Queens College (n.d). Jeffrey Halperin. Retrieved from http://qcpages.qc.cuny.edu/psychology/people/faculty/halperin.html
- Queens College . (n.d.). Faculty Profile. Retrieved from http://www.qc.cuny.edu/qc_profile/faculty/Pages/default.aspx?FullName=Jeffrey%20M.%20Halperin
- Romero, M. (2011). Jeffrey Halperin, Professor of Psychology at Queens College & The Graduate Center. Retrieved from http://queenscourier.com/2011/jeffrey-halperin-professor-of-psychology-at-queens-college-the-graduate-center/
