= Arnold Skemer =

American novelist

Arnold Skemer (born 1946), is an American novelist and publisher. Skemer has operated Phrygian Press since 1985. He also publishes ZYX (begun in 1990), a small xerographic magazine that publishes poetry, short fictions, commentary on innovative fiction and small press matters, and reviews. It appears 2-3 times a year.

Skemer is also the author of eight published novels, including an ambitious ongoing series where each title is a letter of the alphabet (C, D, H etc.).

== Biography ==
He was born in the Bronx, New York, on the Grand Concourse and moved to Queens, New York, in 1957. He graduated from Queens College in 1968.
