= Mark M. Goldblatt =

American political pundit

Mark Goldblatt
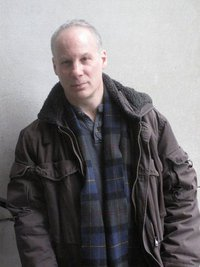
- Born: Mark Meyer Goldblatt; June 8, 1957 (age 69); Queens, New York
- Education: Queens College, CUNY
- Occupations: Writer, teacher
- Website: markgoldblatt.com

Mark Meyer Goldblatt (born June 8, 1957) is an American journalist, novelist, theologian and educator. He attended Queens College of the City University of New York from 1974 to 1979, where he earned a bachelor's degree in English. After brief stints as a proofreader and copyeditor, he enrolled in the CUNY Graduate Center in 1983 and was awarded a doctorate in English literature in 1990, writing his dissertation on the theological underpinning of the Protestant Reformation in England.

Goldblatt is perhaps best known as a political commentator. He published his first opinion piece on the op-ed page of The New York Times in 1989. Since then, he has written hundreds of columns and book reviews for periodicals and online journals such as Newsday, The New York Post, The New York Daily News, Commentary Magazine, USA Today, Reason Magazine, National Review, the American Spectator, the Claremont Review of Books, the Common Review and Intellectual Conservative.

Since 1989, Goldblatt has taught at Fashion Institute of Technology of the State University of New York.

== Political writing ==
Though often classified as a conservative or even a neocon, Goldblatt has on occasion veered from right of center positions. He has been a steadfast supporter of the war against totalitarian Islam and a fierce critic of hip hop culture. In an article published on October 17, in 2005, Goldblatt wrote, "The solution to poverty, therefore, doesn’t lie in a collective movement. It lies in the will and discipline of the individual people who dedicate themselves to living moral lives, striving to improve their circumstances, and providing greater opportunities for their children. By that measure, the great betrayer of African-Americans is not their government but their groins." This statement attracted criticism from hip-hop scholarship. Goldblatt is, additionally, a critic of postmodernism and multiculturalism, but has also argued in favor of legalizing gay marriage and upholding the Roe v. Wade decision. He has written sympathetically about Barack Obama.

Bumper Sticker Liberalism, a book of political commentary, was published by HarperCollins in 2012. In 2022 Goldblatt published I Feel, Therefore I Am: The Triumph of Woke.

== Novels ==
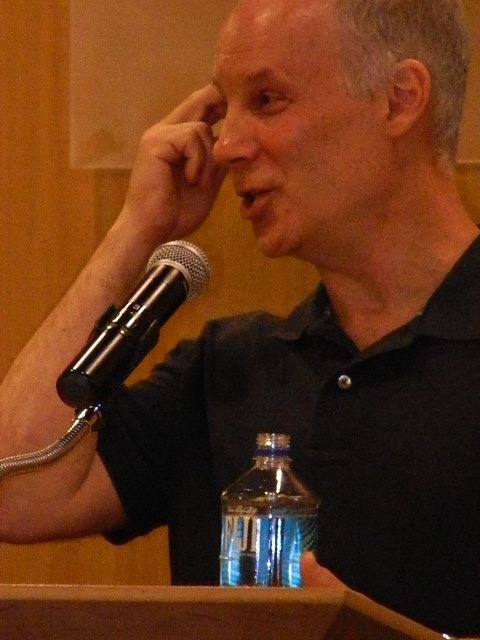
Goldblatt engaging audience at New York book signing. Friday, June 7, 2013.

Goldblatt’s first novel, Africa Speaks, was published by Permanent Press in 2002. It a satire of black urban culture told in the voice of a young black man named Africa Ali. In her blurb for Africa Speaks, far-right columnist Michelle Malkin stated, "With an uncanny knack for the hip-hop idiom, stiletto-sharp satire, unusual sensitivity, and unparalleled courage in tackling racial taboos, Mark Goldblatt has created a masterpiece. Africa Speaks sings." Conservative critic John Podhoretz declared that Goldblatt was "one of America’s most uncompromising literary iconoclasts."

His second novel, Sloth, a comedic take on the through-the-looking-glass world of postmodern thought, was published by Greenpoint Press in 2010. Two more novels followed in 2013: The Unrequited, a literary mystery published by Five Star/Cengage, and Twerp, a middle grade novel published by Random House. Finding the Worm, a sequel to Twerp, was published by Random House in 2015.

== Theology ==
In a pair of essays for the British journal Philosophy Now, Goldblatt addressed the subject of rational language and the existence of God.

In "Did the World Have a Beginning?" he argues that the temporal world cannot always have existed. An actual infinity is impossible, he reasons, because infinity is a potential value that cannot be reached. A line, for example, may be extended infinitely—that is, without a limit—but at no point will the actual measure of the line become infinite. Likewise, time itself, whether measured by minutes or millennia, cannot comprise an actual infinity. Therefore, the temporal world cannot have existed forever.

In a follow up article, "Talking About God", Goldblatt teases out the ramifications of his conclusion about the impossibility of an actual infinity with respect to the concept of an infinite God. Since we know that the temporal world cannot have existed forever, it therefore must have come into existence "in the beginning". It cannot have come into existence without an efficient cause (since that would violate the law of causality, one of the basic laws of thought). That First Cause, Goldblatt states, following the Cosmological Argument of Thomas Aquinas, is what all men call God. But this realization leads to a paradox. On the one hand, it would seem God cannot be infinite either since an actual infinity is impossible. On the other hand, God cannot have come into existence since that would require a cause prior to the First Cause and lead to an infinite regress of causes . . . which, in turn, would comprise an actual infinity (which cannot be). Therefore, we must suppose an infinite God as the First Cause of the world—even though an actual infinity violates the laws of thought. But whatever violates the laws of thought cannot be subject to rational language; it cannot be said to exist any more than a sentient stone (i.e. a sentient non-sentient being) can be said to exist. (At the moment a stone becomes sentient, in other words, it ceases to be a stone.) Goldblatt concludes that two theological statements, which seem irreconcilable, are nevertheless necessarily true: 1) God created the world; 2) God does not exist.
