= James Nyoraku Schlefer =

- Born: James Schlefer; August 31, 1956 (age 69)
- Genres: World music
- Occupations: Musician, composer
- Instruments: Shakuhachi, flute
- Website: nyoraku.com

James Nyoraku Schlefer (Japanese: ジェイムス 如楽 シュレファー), born 1956 in Brooklyn, New York, is a performer and teacher and composer of shakuhachi in New York City. He received the Dai-Shi-Han (Grand Master) certificate in 2001, one of only a handful of non-Japanese to receive this high-level award. In 2008, he received his second Shi-Han certificate from Mujuan Dojo, in Kyoto. In Japan, Schlefer has worked with Reibo Aoki, Katsuya Yokoyama, Yoshio Kurahashi, Yoshinobu Taniguchi, and Kifu Mitsuhashi. His first teacher was Ronnie Nyogetsu Seldin. He holds a master's degree in Western flute and musicology from Queens College and currently teaches shakuhachi class at Columbia University and music history courses at the City University of New York. He has performed at Carnegie Hall, Lincoln Center, the Kennedy Center, Tanglewood, BAM, the Metropolitan Museum, at colleges and universities throughout the US and has toured in Japan, Indonesia, Brazil and counties in Europe. Schlefer has four solo recordings, Wind Heart(which travelled 120,000,000 miles aboard the Space Station MIR) Solstice Spirit (1998), Flare Up (2002), and In The Moment (2008). His music has been featured on NPR's All Things Considered. Schlefer's latest recording Spring Sounds, Spring Seas was released in June 2012 and features his original music for shakuhachi and orchestra.

Schlefer first heard the shakuhachi in 1979, while working towards his master's degree in musicology. This was at a musical soiree in New York's famed Dakota building, hosted by one of the professors at the CUNY Graduate Center. There was a sankyoku ensemble of shakuhachi, koto and shamisen, and following the recital, Schlefer was offered the opportunity to play the bamboo flute. The effort was met with total failure and taking that as a mandate, he began his now three-decade long pursuit.

Schlefer performs traditional and modern music with other Japanese instruments, including the shamisen and the koto. An exceptional solo artist, his appearances include lectures about the origin, history, and development of Japanese music. Schlefer has been a soloist in several orchestral settings including the New York City Opera, Karl Jenkins’ Requiem, and others.

He has performed and lectured at Duke University (in two, week-long artist residencies), and at the Juilliard School, Manhattan and Eastman Schools of Music, Vassar, Haverford, Brown, Moravian, Colby, Colby-Sawyer, Williams and Hunter Colleges, and at music festivals in the US, South America, Asia and Europe.

Nyoraku Sensei is head of the Kyo Shin An teaching studio in New York City. He has written two etude books for shakuhachi technical development.

As a composer, Schlefer has written many pieces for Japanese instruments including a shakuhachi concerto, a quintet for shakuhachi and string quartet, and numerous pieces for traditional Japanese instruments.

== Education and lineage ==
Schlefer was introduced to the shakuhachi in 1979, while working towards his master's degree in musicology. He attended a sankyoku ensemble of shakuhachi, koto and shamisen, and following the recital he was offered the chance to play the shakuhachi, and although he was a working professional silver flute player he was unable to produce a tone on the shakuhachi, spurring his interest and eventual devotion to the instrument.

Nyoraku Sensei is a grand master of the Jin Nyodo lineage, having learned from Kurahashi Yoshio, Mitsuhashi Kifu, Ronnie Nyogetsu Seldin, and Keisuke Zenyoji, all of whose teachers learned from Jin Nyodo. Jin Sensei's honkyoku repertoire draws from several traditional lines; Kinko ryu, Kinpu ryu, and Fuke Meian. In turn, Schlefer has taught and licensed several students, including Brian Tairaku Ritchie.

== Performance career ==
Schlefer frequently performs traditional and modern music with other Japanese instruments, including the shamisen and the koto. He also performs with classical music ensembles such as string quartets, orchestras, and other chamber ensembles. An educator as well as performer, his appearances include lectures about the origin, history, and development of Japanese music. Schlefer has been a soloist in several orchestral settings including the New York City Opera, Karl Jenkins' Requiem, and others. He has performed and lectured at Duke University (in two, week-long artist residencies), and at the Juilliard School, Manhattan and Eastman Schools of Music, Vassar, Haverford, Brown, Union, Moravian, Colby, Colby-Sawyer, Williams and Hunter Colleges, and at music festivals in the U.S., South America, Asia and Europe.

== Composer ==
James Nyoraku Schlefer holds advanced degrees and has years of performing experience in two musical traditions. His original compositions bring these worlds together. Of particular interest to Schlefer is combining Japanese and Western instruments in new compositions that explore two sound worlds.

As a composer, Schlefer has received numerous commissions and grants, including from the Orchestra of the Swan (UK), Dancing in the Streets (with the support of the Mary Flagler Cary Trust Live Music for Dance Program), SONOS Chamber Orchestra, the Satori Chamber Ensemble, and PEARSONWIDRIG DANCETHEATER (with the support of the O’Donnell Green Foundation and the AMC Live Music for Dance Program).

In 2008, Schlefer founded Kyo-Shin-An Arts, a not-for-profit arts organization “dedicated to the appreciation and integration of Japanese musical instruments in Western classical music.” Kyo-Shin-An Arts commissions and produces new works and concerts that highlight the outstanding virtuosity of the koto, shakuhachi and shamisen.

== Educator ==
Schlefer is founder and head of the Kyo-Shin-An teaching studio in New York City. He has published books of traditional notation and written two etude books for shakuhachi technical development. He holds two Shi-Han (Master) certificates, and one Dai-Shi-Han (Grand Master) certificate, and is well respected as a teacher in both the U.S. and Japan. He has been passing on shakuhachi tradition for nearly twenty years and devotes many hours each week to teaching.

Nyoraku Sensei's dojo is in Park Slope, Brooklyn. Students learn in the Japanese style, facing the teacher and first singing then playing the music together. Historically, traditional music was taught entirely by rote, with the student copying everything the teacher played by ear. At Kyo-Shin-An, the spirit of this method is maintained but with contemporary modifications, such as using notation, and with comments and suggestions to improve playing.

In the course of study, students learn to play 41 pieces of honkyoku (Zen Buddhist traditional music), 45 sankyoku pieces (chamber music played with koto and shamisen), and numerous folk songs. Upon completing this curriculum, a licensing course (which involves playing the music upside down and “teaching” it to the teacher), and a public performance, students will earn a Jun-Shi-Han Associate certificate and receive a Japanese name.

== Books and Etudes ==
- The Practical Shakuhachi (2008) Exercises and Etudes for Technical Development
- Shakuhachi Workbook (2000) Exercises for Technical Development

== Discography ==
- Esquisses, with The Powell Quartet
- Voice of the Whale (1994)
- Wind Heart (1996)
- Solstice Spirit (1999)
- Buddha and Bonsai (vol.4)
- Flare Up (2002)
- In The Moment (2009)
- Spring Sounds, Spring Seas (2011)MSR Classics

== Compositions ==
• LOOK DOWN THE ROAD - Shakuhachi, piano soprano. Text by Lewis Carrol. (2025) one movement. 7 mins

• BAMBOO DANCES - Shakuhachi, two violins, viola, cello. (2025) Seven movement. 22 mins

• TOMMY - Shakuhachi, Shamisen, Koto, two violins, viola, cello, voice. (2024) One movement. 25 mins

• SHAKUHACHI FOR AIRPORTS - Four Shakuhachi (2022) One Movement, 18 Min.

• MOON THROUGH THE PINES - Shakuhachi, Shamisen, koto, voice (2022) One Movement, 17 min.

• SKYDIVE - Shakuhachi, Piano, Cello, Percussion (2022) One Movement, 18 Min.

• DREAM WAVES - Shamisen and Cello (2021) One Movement, 17 min.

• THE FULL BLOOD MOON –Shakuhachi, Koto, Shamisen and String Quartet (2019) One Movement, app. 15 min.

• FLUTE GROOVE – for Flute Choir of twelve or more players (2019) One Movement, app. 15 min.

• CURBSIDE SHUFFLE –Shakuhachi and Cello (2018) One Movement, app. 12 min. SoundCloud

• THE TROGLODYTE –Shakuhachi, Two Violins, Viola, Cello, Double Bass (2018) One Movement, app. 17 min.

• FANTAZÍA – Violin solo and chamber orchestra (2017) One movement, 14 minutes YouTube

• 2BLUE– Shakuhachi and Viola (2016) One movement, 7 minutes

• JAMU II – Shakuhachi, Koto, Flute, String Trio and Percussion (2016) One movement, app 11 min.

• JAMU! – Shakuhachi, Koto, Flute, String Trio and Percussion (2015) Two movements, app 11 min.

• FULL-OUT STILLNESS – Shakuhachi, Koto and Cello (2014) One Movement, app. 12 min.

• SIDEWALK DANCES –Shakuhachi and Cello (2014) One Movement, app. 14 min.

• DREAM CORNER –Shakuhachi, Koto, Shamisen, Voice and String Quartet (2013) 11 Movements, app. 38 minutes.

• CONCERTANTE – Solo Shakuhachi, Koto, Violin and Cello with Chamber Orchestra (2013) Three movements, app. 21 min.

• STRING JOURNEY – Shamisen, Voice and String Quartet (2012) One movement, app. 12 min.

• SMILE ON THE BUDDHA CALM – Piano Trio with Shakuhachi (2012) In one movement, app. 9 min. VIMEO

• SANKYOKU NO. 1 – Shakuhachi, Koto and Cello (2011) Three movements, app. 20 min. VIMEO

• TAKE REI – Shakuhachi and Crotales (2011) One movement, app. 8 minutes.

• HARU NO UMI REDUX Shakuhachi, Koto and String Orchestra or String Quartet. (2011) 9 minutes YOUTUBE

• OASHISU – Dance Score for Shakuhachi, Koto, Cello and Percussion (2010) Multiple movements, 20 minutes.

• CONCERTO FOR SHAKUHACHI – for Shakuhachi, Strings, Harp and Percussion (2009) Three movements, 28 minutes. YOUTUBE

• QUINTET No. 1– for Shakuhachi and String Quartet (2006) Three movements, 25 minutes.

COMPOSITIONS FOR JAPANESE INSTRUMENTS

• WE SHALL (SURELY) MEET AGAIN –Shakuhachi, Koto, Shamisen (2017) One Movement, app. 13 min. VIMEO

• TROIS BAMBOU: HOMMAGE A HOZAN YAMAMOTO – Three Shakuhachi (2014), app. 7 minutes.

• MOONWALKING – Shakuhachi and Bass Koto (2012) Three movements. app. 14 minutes. SOUNDCLOUD

• DUO No. 3 – for Shakuhachi and 20-string Koto (2007) One Movement, 15 minutes.

• DUO No. 2 – for Shakuhachi and Shamisen (2006) One movement, 10 minutes. YOUTUBE

• KUMOIJISHI – for Four Shakuhachi (2005) Arrangement of traditional honkyoku. 6 minutes.

• BIG PIECE – for Shakuhachi Orchestra in Five Parts (2004) One movement, 12 minutes.

• DUO No. I – for Shakuhachi and Koto (2004) One movement, 13 minutes. YOUTUBE

• FLARE UP – for solo Shakuhachi (2002) One Movement, 8 minutes.

• TIMELESS MOMENT – for Four Shakuhachi (2001) One Movement, 5 minutes.

• COUPLE DANCE – for Two Shakuhachi (1999) 13 minutes. Commissioned by Mary Flagler Cary Trust

• BROOKLYN SANYA – for solo Shakuhachi (1999) One movement, 9 minutes.

• DARANI REVISITED – for Shakuhachi, Violin, Viola, Cello (1998) Arrangement of traditional piece. One movement, 8 minutes.

• VARIATIONS ON "AMAZING GRACE" – for solo Shakuhachi (1997) 6 minutes.

• SOLSTICE SPIRIT – for Shakuhachi Orchestra in Four Parts (1997) 18 minutes.
