= Twerp =

2013 children's book by Mark M. Goldblatt

Twerp is a 2013 children's book by Mark M. Goldblatt about a little boy named Julian who is friends with a boy named Lonnie. Bullying is one theme of the book. This book is to help people remember "what makes a good friend".

It was published by Random House (ISBN 978-0375971426).

== Reviews ==
- Karen Coats
- Thebookbag
- Kirkus
