= Jim Osman =

American sculptor

Jim Osman (born 1956, New York) is a contemporary American sculptor. He is the recipient of a New York Foundation for the Arts Fellowship and a Brooklyn Arts Council Grant. His works have been exhibited at institutions such as The Brooklyn Museum of Art, The New York Public Library and The Queens Museum.

== Education and career ==
Osman received a MFA (1982) and a BA (1979) from Queens College, City University of New York.

Over the course of his career, Osman has been making sculptures that are formal contemplations on architecture, structure and space. Made primarily out of wood, paint and construction paper, Osman's works range from more intricate free-standing floor pieces to smaller-scale, more intimate sculptures. Working with materials commonly associated with construction, Osman presents opportunities to examine what can be embedded in homely assemblies. In re-contextualizing objects to form new shapes, Osman's gesture is often one of playful geometry. One sculpture may appear subtly constructed and at once block-like. Critic Jonathan Goodman commented on this tension, saying, "Given as they are to an agreeably rough presentation, it would be easy to see his works as entirely improvisatory; close inspection, however, reveals a sharp formal intelligence at work."

Osman's work has been exhibited at galleries and institutions including The Brooklyn Museum of Art; The New York Public Library; The Queens Museum; Long Island University's Kumbal Gallery; Dartmouth College; the University of Texas at San Antonio; White Columns; and Lesley Heller Gallery.

His public sculptures have been shown at PULSE Miami, FL; Art Hamptons, NY; Sculpture Mile in Madison, Conn; and at the East 4th Street Garden in Brooklyn, NY.

Osman has been an assistant professor at Parsons The New School of Design since 2000 and well as having taught at Queens College, City University of New York and Dartmouth College.

Jim Osman is a member and president emeritus of American Abstract Artists.

== Residencies, fellowships and awards ==
- 2017 New York Foundation for the Arts Fellowship in Crafts/Sculpture
- 2010-2017 Parsons School of Design Faculty Development Grant
- 2004-2009 Brooklyn Arts Council Grant
- 2004 Yaddo Residency
- 1998 MacDowell Colony Residency
- 1993 Artists Space Exhibition Grant
