= Stewart Liff =

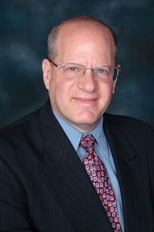
- Born: 1951; Rego Park, New York, U.S.
- Education: Queens College, Hunter College
- Occupation: Management consultant
- Website: stewartliff.com

Stewart Liff (born 1951) is an American author and management consultant known for his work in Human Resources Management, Performance Management, Visual Management and team development. Liff has served in various senior government personnel and management positions and as a consultant and teacher to government agencies and businesses. He has written seven books, is a frequent conference speaker, and is a regular contributing author to government and professional publications.

== Career ==
Stewart Liff began his government career as a personnel specialist with the Department of Defense in 1974. He later served as Chief of Employee and Labor Relations for the Veterans Health Administration James J. Peters VA Medical Center in the Bronx, NY. In 1981 Liff was appointed to the Veteran’s Administration (VA) New York Regional Office where he served first as Personnel Officer and later as Assistant Director where he received the President's Council on Management Improvement Award. During his tenure there, that office received the first Hammer Award from Vice President Al Gore for reinventing government. In 1994, Liff was named the Director of the VA's Los Angeles Regional Office, which under his leadership received the U.S. Office of Personnel Management's (OPM's) prestigious PILLAR (Performance Incentives Leadership Linked to Achieving Results) Award. During his time there he also received the Presidential Rank Award for Meritorious Service and was assigned to Washington, D.C. for almost a year as the acting Chief of the Veterans' Benefits Administration's Human Resource Division.

Liff retired from government service in 2006 and has authored five books on government performance management and human resources management. Liff’s titles are recommended books on leadership in government by various management associations. He also co-authored, Seeing is Believing: How the New Art of Visual Management can Boost Performance throughout your Organization, along with Pamela A. Posey, D.B.A. He has served as a consultant and/or teacher to businesses and more than a dozen U.S. and state government agencies including the U.S. Department of Labor, U.S. Department of Veterans Affairs, U.S. Department of Defense, OPM, The World Bank, the Ohio Department of Alcohol, Drugs and Mental Health and the State Government of Georgia.

In 2011–12 multiple consulting contracts with the Department of Labor and OPM, including several where Stewart Liff served as a subcontractor, were reviewed as part of Office of Inspector General investigations concerning allegations that Department of Labor and OPM officials violated procurement rules. Liff asserted he received no special treatment and conformed to all government contracting and work performance requirements, and the Inspector General investigations found no wrongdoing by Liff in connection with the procurement of his services as a government contractor. Liff filed a lawsuit against the Department of Labor, alleging that its investigation violated his constitutional rights and caused damage to his reputation. Liff also challenged actions by OPM in the wake of its investigation that he contended deepened the effects of the Department of Labor Investigation. In 2014, Liff co-authored the book, A Team of Leaders, with Paul Gustavson. Soundview Executive Book Summaries name it one of the 30 best business books of 2014. In 2014, Liff gave a keynote address at the 2014 GOV HR Summit in Abu Dhabi. He also taught classes in Singapore, Dubai and Qatar. In February 2015, he was named a Fellow by the Performance Institute.

== Bibliography ==
- Liff, Stewart (2011). Improving the Performance of Government Employees: A Manager's Guide. New York: AMACOM. ISBN 978-0-8144-1622-8.
- Liff, Stewart (2009). The Complete Guide to Hiring and Firing Government Employees. New York: AMACOM. ISBN 978-0-8144-1450-7.
- Liff, Stewart (2009). Managing Your Government Career: Success Strategies That Work. New York: AMACOM. ISBN 978-0-8144-1099-8.
- Liff, Stewart (2007). Managing Government Employees: How to Motivate Your People, Deal with Difficult Issues, and Achieve Tangible Results. New York: AMACOM. ISBN 978-0-8144-0887-2.
- Liff, Stewart; Pamela A. Posey (2007). Seeing is Believing: How the New Art of Visual Management Can Boost Performance Throughout Your Organization. New York: AMACOM. ISBN 978-0-8144-0035-7.
