= Shifra Bronznick =

American feminist activist

Shifra Bronznick is a feminist activist who focuses largely on Jewish women's rights and organizational life.

Bronznick is the founder of Advancing Women Professionals, a senior fellow at New York University's Wagner School of Public Service and the co-author of Leveling the Playing Field with Marty Linsky and Didi Goldenhar.
