= Ester Fuchs =

American academic (born 1951)

Ester R. Fuchs
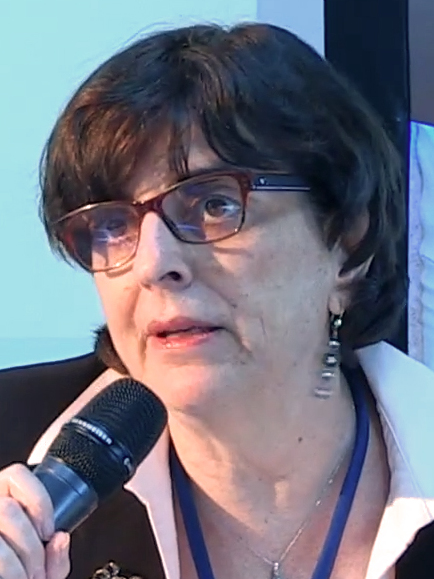

Academic background
- Education: Queens College, CUNY; Brown University; University of Chicago

Academic work
- Discipline: Urban Policy
- Institutions: Columbia University School of International and Public Affairs
- Notable students: Karine Jean-Pierre

Ester Rachel Fuchs (born August 14, 1951) is an American academic. She is Professor of Public Affairs and Political Science at Columbia University's School of International and Public Affairs. Fuchs studied at Queens College, CUNY, Brown University, and the University of Chicago.

She wrote Mayors and Money: Fiscal Policy in New York and Chicago, and describes herself as a "Pragmatic Utopian".

== Career ==
Fuchs started her career in education as a teaching assistant at Brown University's Department of Political Science in 1973, while studying for her Master's Degree. She then worked as an instructor at the University of Notre Dame in 1980. Later that same year, she joined Barnard College's Department of Political Science as a visiting assistant professor. She became the director of Barnard's Urban Studies Program in 1981, and an assistant professor the following year.

Fuchs served as Special Advisor to the Mayor for Governance and Strategic Planning under New York City Mayor Michael Bloomberg from 2002 to 2005.

From 2004 to 2005, Fuchs served as Chair of the 2005 New York City Charter Revision Commission. She currently serves as Director of WhosOnTheBallot.org, an online platform working to increase voter participation and education in New York City elections.

In January 2006, she left the Bloomberg Administration to rejoin Columbia University as the head of its Center for Urban Research and Policy.

Among her notable students is Karine Jean-Pierre, former White House Press Secretary, who credited Fuchs' mentorship for inspiring her to get involved in politics.

In 2024, Fuchs was appointed to the New York City Council's New Arrivals Strategy Team.

== Awards and honors ==
In 2017, Fuchs was awarded the Bella Abzug Leadership Award. She was the recipient of the NASPAA Public Service Matters Spotlight Award in 2014.

== Antisemitism Task Force ==
In November 2023, Fuchs was named one of three co-chairs of Columbia University's Task Force on Antisemitism, created in response to escalating tensions between pro-Israel and pro-Palestinian campus members. She has been a vocal supporter of Columbia's financial and research ties to Israel
