= Nino Lo Bello =

American journalist

Nino Lo Bello (1922–1997) was an American author and journalist who specialized in writing about the Vatican. He also wrote under the pseudonym Walter Hoffman.

He was born in Brooklyn, New York and graduated from Queens College in 1943 with a BA in political science.

He taught at the University of Kansas before moving to Rome where he reported on the Catholic Church. He worked as the Italian correspondent for the New York Herald Tribune for eight years. Lo Bello mostly wrote travel articles and about the arts.

He wrote a tell-all book about the Vatican named The Vatican Papers, published in 1982 by New English Library, Sevenoaks, UK. He also wrote The Vatican Empire, which delved into the financial side of the Catholic church. First published in 1968, the book was a best-seller that year.

He died at the age of 75 from a heart attack.

== Bibliography ==
- The Vatican Empire 1968
- European Detours: A Travel Guide to Unusual Sights 1981
- The Vatican Papers 1982
- The Incredible Book of Vatican Facts and Papal Curiosities – a treasury of trivia, Gramercy Books, New York, 1998 ISBN 0-517-22083-0
