= Cindy Rakowitz =

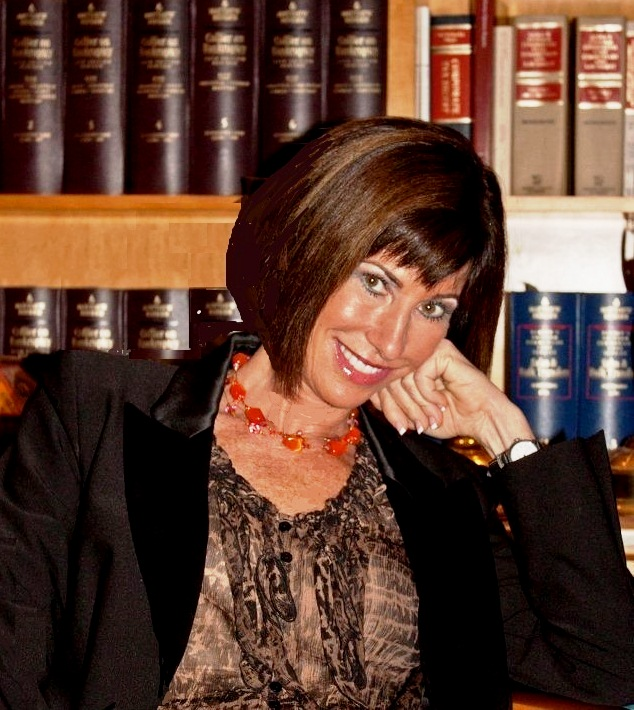
- Born: Cindy Plaut; Plattsburgh, New York
- Education: Queens College, City University of New York
- Known for: Division President for Playboy Enterprises (1986–2001)
- Board member of: United States Global Enterprise Association
- Awards: Luminaire Award - Women in Production; 3 Clio Awards on behalf of Playboy for excellence in advertising 13 Mercury Awards
- Website: www.brpublicrelations.com

Cindy Rakowitz is an American public relations executive, and a former division president for Playboy Enterprises, where she ran international public relations, marketing and advertising, as well as the modeling agency for over 15 years.

== Playboy ==
Between the years 1986 and 2001, Rakowitz managed Playboy's policies in the fields of public relations, marketing and advertising, also representing the company as spokesperson in relation to the major media outlets. She was involved in the development of Playboy brand and its related trademarks and logos, she advised the celebrities who had a relationship with Playboy, voiced Playboy's views on various issues and produced Playboy's major events. Cindy worked on a daily basis with Playboy founder Hugh M. Hefner, in the strategic planning of his Mansion parties and representing him as a spokesperson.

She was on the board of the Playboy Foundation and became involved in AIDS research and education (she helped and supported Rebekka Armstrong when she came out as HIV-positive and became one of the best-known public faces of heterosexual HIV transmission).

Considering an independent career, Rakowitz left the company in 2001, after negotiating the terms of a four-month notice. It was at that time that the internet became a popular vehicle for adult entertainment and Playboy began providing these users with harder core sexual programming.

== BR Public Relations ==
After leaving Playboy Enterprises, Rakowitz started her own media and entertainment company in Los Angeles, named RNR Entertainment, then she co-founded, together with Diane Blackman, Blackman Rakowitz Public Relations (known as BR Public Relations). She planned and executed brand strategies for major companies, establishing luxury brands, like Patrón tequila or Dermalogica skincare. In Patrón tequila's case, the media strategy changed perceptions about tequila, producing positive media coverage after securing endorsements from celebrities like Jamie Foxx and Kevin Costner or after featuring it as the choice of Tom Cruise's character in Vanilla Sky.

== Media ==
Rakowitz hosts Stars of PR on VoiceAmerica Radio, a live weekly radio program devoted to public relations and marketing. She appears in other media as a public relations consultant, with opinions about the image of various public figures. As a media trainer, she is known for her ability to advise her clients how to deal with the press during unanticipated crises. She received certification from Harvard Law's Disputes Program in 1993.

She is involved in social media advocacy, as a speaker on marketing through social media platforms and as the editor of ProVisors' newsletter Trusted Advisor.

== Writer ==
In 2012, she published Emergency Public Relations: Crisis Management In a 3.0 World (co-authored with Alan B. Bernstein), a book on crisis management issues and rapid responses to public relation emergencies.

== Fit 4 The Cause ==
Rakowitz initiated Fit 4 The Cause, a Thousand Oaks based non-profit organization raising funds for health related causes through group fitness programs performed in unexpected venues, such as malls, parks, corporate suites, hotels, rooftops and health clubs. Until 2012, she participated in group exercise programs as a hobby, then she became more interested in the fitness lifestyle and its effects on physical and mental well-being. In February 2013, she was licensed by the American Counsel on Exercise certification and began working as a Group Fitness Instructor.
