= Ira B. Lamster =

American periodontist

Ira B. Lamster, dean emeritus of Columbia University College of Dental Medicine.

Ira B. Lamster is an American board certified periodontist. He is a professor of health and policy management at Columbia University's Mailman School of Public Health. Formerly, he was the dean and professor of dentistry at the Columbia University College of Dental Medicine until stepping down the end of the 2012 school year.Lamster also received a number of donations from Jeffrey Epstein in 2017.

== Education ==
Lamster received his bachelor's degree from Queens College in 1971 and received an S.M. from University of Chicago in 1972. He received his DDS in 1977 from the State University of New York at Stony Brook School of Dental Medicine and his certificate in periodontics from Harvard School of Dental Medicine in 1980, along with a MMSc from Harvard University in the same year.

== Academic career ==
Lamster served as the director of the Division of Periodontology at Columbia University from 1988 to 1998 and as vice dean of the institution from 1998 to 2001. In December 2001, he was also named vice president of the Columbia University Medical Center.

Lamster has authored over 150 research papers and textbook chapters. He is also board certified by the American Board of Oral Medicine.

Together with Drs. Murray Schwartz and James Burke Fine, he co-authored Clinical Guide to Periodontics.

In March 2012, Lamster announced that he would be stepping down from his position as dean of Columbia University College of Dental Medicine, effective at the end of the 2012 school year. He moved to the Columbia University Mailman School of Public Health, where he serves the function of a facilitator and thinking counselor.
