= Lina Puerta =

- Born: 1969 (age 56–57)
- Education: Wells College; Queens College, City University of New York
- Known for: Mixed media
- Website: linapuerta.net

Lina Puerta (born 1969) is a Colombian-American mixed media artist based in New York City. She was born in New Jersey and grew up in Colombia.

== Education ==
Lina Puerta studied at Institute Lorenzode Medici in Florence, Italy, and earned her BA from Wells College with Honors in Studio Art in 1992. Then she earned her master's degree in Art Education from Queens College in 1998.

== Art ==
Puerta's work covers several mediums, all of which are heavily influenced by materials and their metaphorical significance to the work. She combines jewelry, fabric, paint, buttons, resin, wire, wood, etc. in her sculpture work, exploring the tension between nature and the human-made. Both her sculpture work and her work on paper focus on themes of nature, man made structures, fragility, and the environment in relation to humanity.

Puerta's Botanico Series (2011–2014) is installation based and incorporates polyurethane resin, wood, foam, paint, fiberfill, fabric, chains, rhinestones, beads, trims, and artificial plants and moss to create natural spaces emerging from a human-made object. These works explore the relationship between nature and control, as these organic, plant-based works burst through their designated locations.

The Farmworker Series (2017) is one of Puerta's more recent projects. She uses paper making techniques to create vibrant tapestries which bring attention to farm workers on crops in the American south. Puerta weaves different materials in the tapestries, including lace, trims, sequined fabrics, velvet, handmade woven textile, pom-poms, fake fur, and gouache. Each piece also includes [renderings] of the flowers and leaves from the crops represented in each image, as well as, birds and insects as pollinators to these crops.

== Selected exhibitions ==
=== Solo exhibitions ===
- Lina Puerta: Migration, Nature, and the Feminine, Hunter East Harlem, New York, NY, 2022
- Lina Puerta: Tapestries, Smack Mellon, Brooklyn, NY, 2018
- Lina Puerta: Manigua, from the Botánico Series, a site-specific installation for The Miller Theatre at Columbia University in collaboration with The UPTOWN Triennale of the Wallach Art Gallery, New York, NY, 2017–2018
- Within/Without, Geary Contemporary, New York, NY, 2017
- Traces, Geary Contemporary, New York, NY, 2015
- La Muerte de un Arbol (The Death of a Tree), Residency Exhibition, Materials for the Arts, New York, NY, 2014
- Lina Puerta: Natura, The Sage Colleges: Opalka Gallery, Albany, NY, 2009

=== Selected group exhibitions ===
- Around the Table: Stories of the Foods We Love. New York Botanical Garden. New York, NY, 2022
- Building Radical Soil. The Latinx Project, New York University, New York, NY, 2022
- Radical Love, Ford Foundation Gallery, New York, NY, 2019
- HyperAccumulators, Pelham Art Center, Pelham, NY, 2019
- Sedimentations: Assemblage as Social Repair, The 8th Floor, New York, NY, 2018
- Living/Breathing, Morgan Lehman 2, New York, NY, 2018
- Art, Artists & You, Children's Museum of Manhattan, New York, NY, 2018
- Labor&Materials, 21c Museum Hotels, Bentonville, AR, 2018
- Harlem Perspectives, Faction Art Projects, New York, NY, 2018
- Site & Survey: The Architecture of Landscape, Richmond Center for Visual Arts at Western Michigan University, Kalamazoo, MI, 2018
- Dark and Stormy Night: The Gothic in Contemporary Art, Lehman College Art Gallery, Bronx, NY, 2018
- Nature is Back!, H Gallery, Paris, France, 2017
- American Histories, PI Artworks, London, UK, 2016–2017
- The 20th Anniversary Show, Smack Mellon, Brooklyn, NY, 2016
- RE·, The Fed Galleries at KCAD, Grand Rapids, MI, 2016
- Field Studies, Tiger Strikes Asteroid, Bushwick, NY, 2016
- The (Not) So Secret Life of Plants, Paul Robeson Galleries, Rutgers, The State University of New Jersey, Newark, NJ, 2015
- Back to Eden: Contemporary Artists Wander the Garden, Museum of Biblical Art, New York, NY, 2014
- Eden, Odetta Gallery, Bushwick, NY, 2014
- Barely There, curated by Vadis Turner, Geary Contemporary, New York, NY, 2014
- Mating Season, The Lodge Gallery, New York, NY, 2014
- Prickly, Tender and Steamy: Artists in the Hothouse, Wave Hill, Bronx, NY, 2014
- SELECT 2014: WPA Art Auction Exhibition and Gala, Washington Project for the Arts, Washington, DC, 2014

== Awards ==
- 2016 ArtPrize Eight Sustainability Award, Grand Rapids, MI
- 2017 NYFA Fellowship in the Crafts/Sculpture category, New York, NY

== See also ==
- List of Queens College people

== Selected reviews, articles and publications ==
- Benetton, Luciano (2014). Caribbean: Together Apart: Contemporary Art from (parts of) the Caribbean (Catalog for Imago Mundi). Villorba, Italy: Fabrica.
- Meier, Allison (7 July 2014). "When Snakes Could Walk: Contemporary Artists Take On the Garden of Eden". Hyperallergic.
- Scher, Robin (14 April 2016). "Dallas Art Fair Announces Acquisition Program for its Fellow Museum". Artnews.
- Sutton, Benjamin (1 April 2015). "Relics of a Future Environmental Collapse". Hyperallergic.
- Sutton, Benjamin (1 July 2018). "The Allure of Excess". Artmaze Mag. No. 7.
- Sutton, Benjamin (5 August 2014). "You'll Fall for 'Back to Eden' at the Museum of Biblical Art". Artnet.
- Wheadon, Nico (1 May 2018). "Harlem Perspectives: Decolonizing the Gaze & Refiguring the Local". The Brooklyn Rail.
