= Justice for Jazz Artists =

Justice for Jazz Artists is an organization and campaign which advocates for the rights of jazz artists in New York City, recently focusing on insuring that the main jazz clubs pay into retirement pension funds. In 2014, the campaign received official backing from the New York City Council, including Laurie Cumbo, Jimmy Van Bramer and Corey Johnson.
