= Michael Blakey (anthropologist) =

American anthropologist

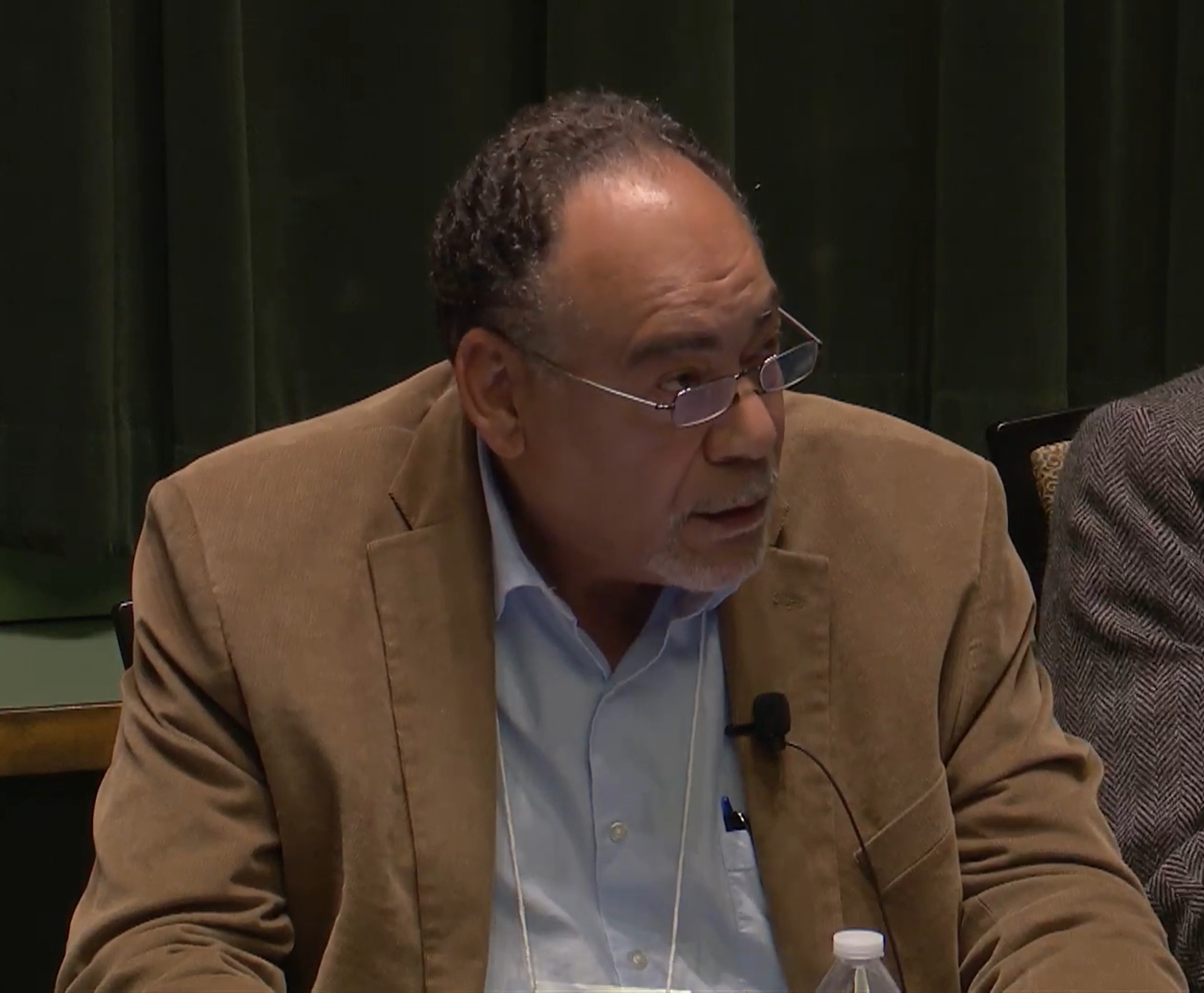
- Born: February 23, 1953 (age 73)

Academic background
- Education: Howard University (BA); University of Massachusetts Amherst (MA, PhD)
- Thesis: Stress, Social Inequality, and Culture Change: An Anthropological Approach to Human Psychophysiology (1985)
- Doctoral advisor: R. Brooke Thomas & Johnnetta Cole, Co-Chair
- Other advisors: George J. Armelagos, M.A. Advisor

Academic work
- Discipline: Anthropology
- Institutions: Howard University; College of William & Mary

Michael L. Blakey (born February 23, 1953) is an American biological anthropologist and bioarchaeologist who specializes in the biological effects of historical and structural inequity on African-descended populations. He is best known as the scientific director and principal investigator of the New York African Burial Ground Project from 1992 to 2009, a landmark bioarchaeological study of 419 colonial-era skeletons that documented the physical toll of enslavement on Africans in colonial New York.

Blakey is currently National Endowment for the Humanities professor at the College of William & Mary, where he directs the Institute for Historical Biology. Previously, he was a professor at Howard University and the founder and curator of Howard University's W. Montague Cobb Biological Anthropology Laboratory. In 2021, he received the President's Award of the American Anthropological Association, presented by AAA President Akhil Gupta in recognition of his work on the African Burial Ground and his advocacy for decolonizing the anthropological canon. That same year he received the Legacy Award of the Association of Black Anthropologists. In 2022, he received the Plumeri Award for Faculty Excellence at William & Mary.

== Early life and education ==
Michael L. Blakey was born on February 23, 1953, in Washington, D.C. As a teenager, he developed an interest in archaeology through his great-uncle and through participation in excavations with the Maryland Archaeological Society. He later described winning a science fair competition and a formative summer internship at the Smithsonian Institution in 1968 as pivotal early experiences. Blakey obtained a B.A. in Anthropology from Howard University in 1978, a M.A. in 1980, and a Ph.D. in Anthropology in 1985 from the University of Massachusetts Amherst. During his graduate studies he traveled to England to conduct research on the biology of contemporary Londoners at the University of London and Oxford University.

== Career ==
=== Howard University ===
Upon completing his doctorate, Blakey joined the faculty of Howard University, where he held appointments in the schools of Liberal Arts and Sciences and Medicine from 1985 to 2001. At Howard, he founded the W. Montague Cobb Biological Anthropology Laboratory and served as curator of its skeletal collections, which he had upgraded in state-of-the-art steel cabinetry with support from the National Science Foundation. He simultaneously held an appointment as Research Associate in Physical Anthropology at the National Museum of Natural History, Smithsonian Institution, from 1985 to 1994. During this period he also held visiting professorships at Spelman College, Columbia University, Brown University, and the Università di Roma La Sapienza.

=== New York African Burial Ground Project ===
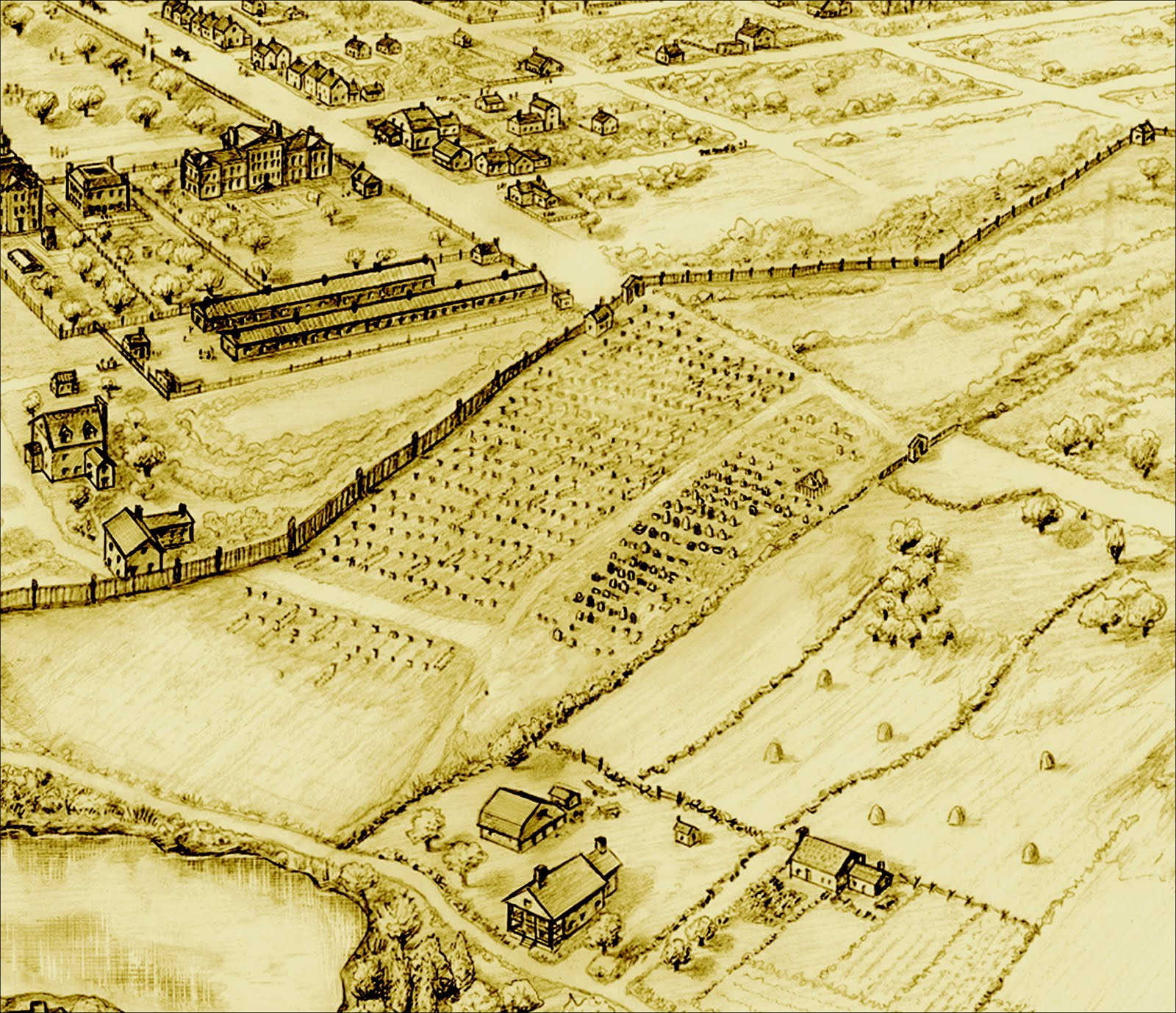
Blakey would become famous for his involvement in the New York African Burial Ground Project

In 1991, construction for a federal office building in Lower Manhattan uncovered human skeletal remains from the colonial-era New York African Burial Ground, a cemetery estimated to contain between 15,000 and 20,000 interments of free and enslaved Africans dating from approximately 1668 to 1795. Blakey, then director of the W. Montague Cobb Laboratory at Howard University, was appointed scientific director and principal investigator for the bioarchaeological analysis of the skeletal remains on September 18, 1992. His appointment followed a controversial first phase: the General Services Administration's original contractor had begun excavating the site amid protests from New York's African American community, which demanded Black scholars lead the research. After congressional hearings in 1992, the agency replaced the contractor and turned the project over to Blakey's team at Howard. He led the project through the publication of its final reports in 2009, overseeing a multidisciplinary team drawn from Howard and eight other collaborating universities, with more than 200 researchers and thirty doctoral specialists working across twelve years at a cost of approximately six million dollars. Blakey's team examined the skeletal remains of 419 individuals, determining that approximately half of those buried were children, and that the adult population showed widespread evidence of nutritional deficiency (including high rates of enamel hypoplasia and porotic hyperostosis), chronic musculoskeletal stress consistent with heavy forced labor, and trauma including healed fractures in a significant proportion of adults. The team also identified 27 individuals with filed or culturally modified teeth, a strong indicator of African birth, nearly tripling the number of such specimens previously known from the Americas.

The project's bioarchaeological findings helped to displace the long-standing perception that slavery and the Atlantic slave trade had played little role in the development of the northern colonies and New York City in particular. A methodological and ethical landmark of the project was Blakey's introduction of the concept of the descendant community and a model of publicly engaged or "clientage" archaeology, in which the living African American community had formal standing in decisions about the research, reburial, and memorialization of the remains. This approach helped shape the conceptual foundation of the National Trust for Historic Preservation's 2018 rubric on engaging descendant communities, and informed the American Anthropological Association's Commission for the Ethical Treatment of Human Remains, which Blakey co-chaired with Deborah Thomas of the University of Pennsylvania from 2022 to 2024. The commission released its final report in May 2026, setting out informed-consent standards for human remains research. After the research was completed, the skeletal remains were reinterred at the site in October 2003, in a ceremony involving 419 hand-carved mahogany coffins made in Ghana. The site was designated a National Historic Landmark in 1993. It was designated a U.S. National Monument by presidential proclamation on February 27, 2006. The memorial, designed by Rodney Léon, was dedicated on October 5, 2007, and a visitor center opened on February 27, 2010, in the Ted Weiss Federal Building. Blakey co-edited the principal research report, The New York African Burial Ground: Unearthing the African Presence in Colonial New York, Volume 1: Skeletal Biology of the New York African Burial Ground (Howard University Press, 2009). The project's final reports also included Volume 2: Archaeology (Perry, Howson and Bianco) and Volume 3: Historical Perspectives (Medford), along with a general-audience synthesis volume, all published by Howard University Press in 2009.

The project was not without controversy. In 1998 the General Services Administration rejected Blakey's $3.6 million budget for the final research phase, stalling the work and leaving DNA and chemical analyses unfunded. Historian Erik Seeman challenged the identification of a coffin-lid tack design as an Akan sankofa symbol, and the selection of the memorial design drew protests from some descendant-community advocates.

=== College of William & Mary ===
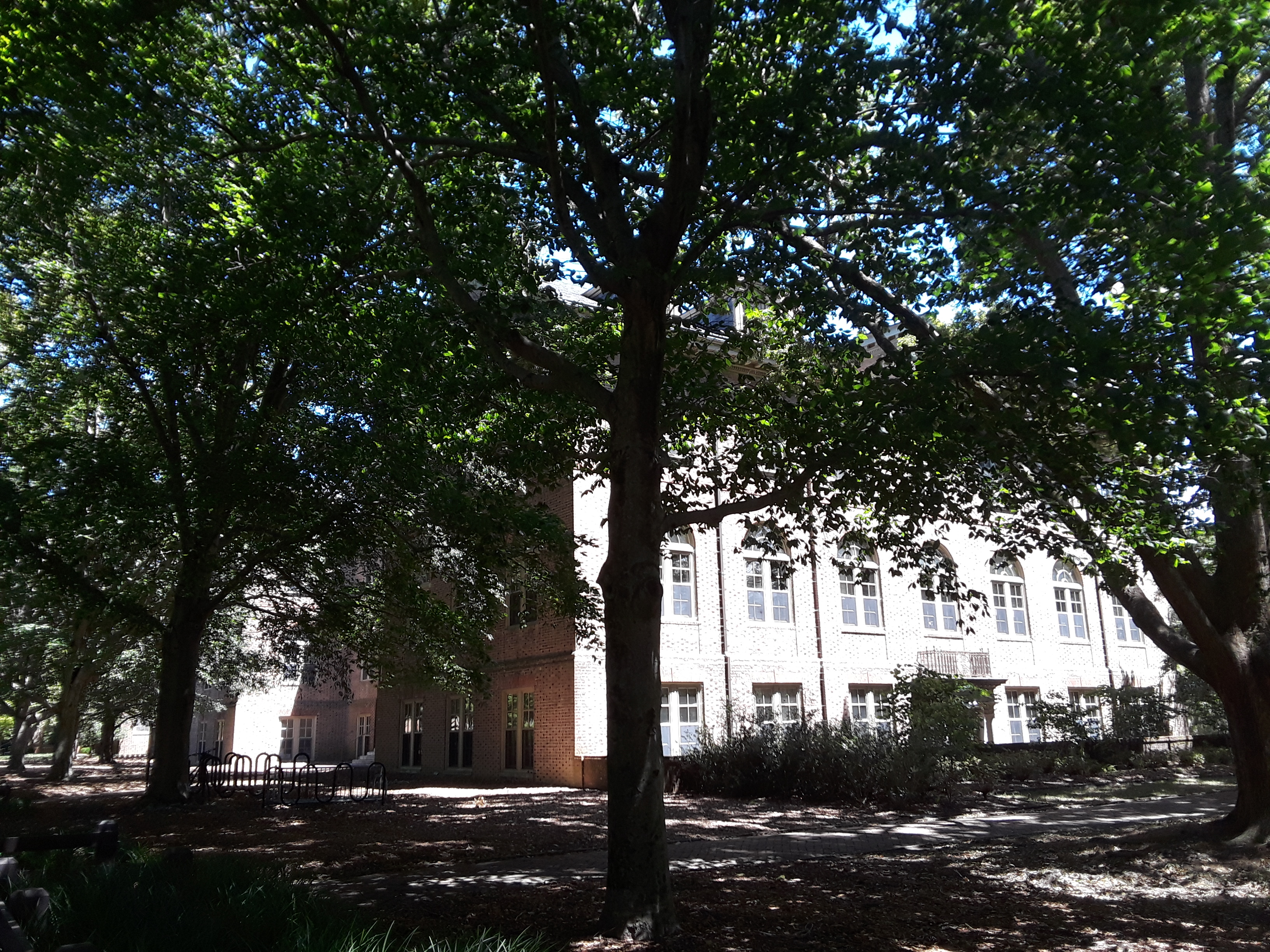
Washington Hall at William & Mary, home of the Institute for Historical Biology

In 2001, Blakey joined the faculty of the College of William & Mary as National Endowment for the Humanities Professor of Anthropology, Africana Studies, and American Studies, positions he continues to hold. He is the founding director of the university's Institute for Historical Biology (IHB), which he established to provide an institutional home for research at the intersection of human biology, history, and culture, and which maintains a comparative database of colonial-era bioarchaeological and demographic data from across the Americas. From 2010 to 2014, he directed the Remembering Slavery, Resistance, and Freedom Project, a partnership of the Virginia General Assembly, the Virginia Foundation for the Humanities, and William & Mary.

== Research and scholarship ==
Blakey describes himself as a "three-field anthropologist" working on the interface of biology, culture, and history, with a particular focus on the biological effects of social inequity past and present, and on the role of racism in science and society. His research spans paleopathology, historical demography, biocultural anthropology, museum studies, and the history and philosophy of science, and has appeared in such journals as the American Journal of Physical Anthropology, American Anthropologist, International Journal of Anthropology, and Critique of Anthropology. He has produced approximately 90 publications. His 1997 article "Seizing Intellectual Power: The Dialogue at the New York African Burial Ground," co-written with Cheryl LaRoche, became a widely cited statement of the community-engaged research model. His early and widely cited article "Skull Doctors: Intrinsic Social and Political Bias in the History of American Physical Anthropology" (1987) offers a systematic critique of the field's historical entanglement with eugenics and scientific racism, arguing that its orientation toward natural rather than social explanations for human variation has persisted in attenuated form after World War II. His 2001 review article "Bioarchaeology of the African Diaspora in the Americas: Its Origins and Scope," published in the Annual Review of Anthropology, synthesized over seventy years of skeletal evidence bearing on the health of enslaved and free African-descended populations in the Americas and established a framework for diaspora bioarchaeology as a distinct subdiscipline. Blakey's most recent major work is the three-volume series The Blinding Light of Race: Race and Racism in Western Science and Society, published by Routledge in 2025. The three volumes are Anthropology and Slavery at the Dawn of White Supremacy, The Racial Segregation and Eugenical Science Between the Wars, and Unmarking Whiteness and the New American Racism.

== Professional service and recognition ==
Blakey served as president of the Association of Black Anthropologists from 1987 to 1989. He received an honorary Doctor of Science from CUNY York College in 1995. He received a second President's Award from the American Anthropological Association in 2024, for his leadership of the Commission for the Ethical Treatment of Human Remains. His other honors include the Prize for Distinguished Achievement in the Critical Study of North America from the Society for the Anthropology of North America (2012), the Centennial Medal of the University of Massachusetts Amherst Graduate School (2008), the Distinguished Public Scholar Lifetime Achievement Award in Africana Studies from IUPUI (2009), and the Elija Muhammad Human Rights Award from the African Scientific Research Institute in Chicago (2005). He represented the United States on the Council of the World Archaeological Congress in Cape Town, South Africa (1999). He has served on the editorial boards of American Anthropologist (2012–2016) and American Antiquity (2021–), and on numerous boards and panels of the American Anthropological Association. He is a member of the Scholarly Advisory Committee of the National Museum of African American History and Culture, Smithsonian Institution (2006–), and served as a key adviser to the Race: Are We So Different? traveling exhibition of the American Anthropological Association. From 2022 to 2024, Blakey served as co-chair of the American Anthropological Association's Commission for the Ethical Treatment of Human Remains, which conducted global listening sessions with Indigenous and marginalized communities to inform future ethics in bioarchaeology and human remains collections.
