= Harriet Taub =

Harriet Taub is the Executive Director of Materials for the Arts, one of the largest reuse centers in the U.S.

In 1998 she joined MFTA, a reuse center that redirects used materials to arts organizations in New York City, and which The New York Times described as "like a Kmart reimagined as Pee-wee's Big Adventure." MFTA is a program of the New York City Department of Cultural Affairs, and Taub also co-founded and helms its affiliated nonprofit, Friends of Materials for the Arts, which provides teacher training, arts and environmental education, and arts programming like artist residencies. In an interview with the Huffington Post, Taub asserted that "without question, the thing I am most proud of and they can put it on my tombstone, is that I helped start the Education Program" at Friends of Materials for the Arts

Taub graduated from NYU's Steinhardt School of Education and spent her early career in education, then fashion (starting her own clothing line, Bumblewear). In 1979 Taub and her husband, filmmaker Harry Kafka, also produced a documentary film called Sosúa about a community of Jewish refugees who found refuge from Hitler in the Dominican Republic.
