= Abolitionist Place =

Historic site in Brooklyn, New York

Coordinates: 40°41′29″N 73°59′04″W

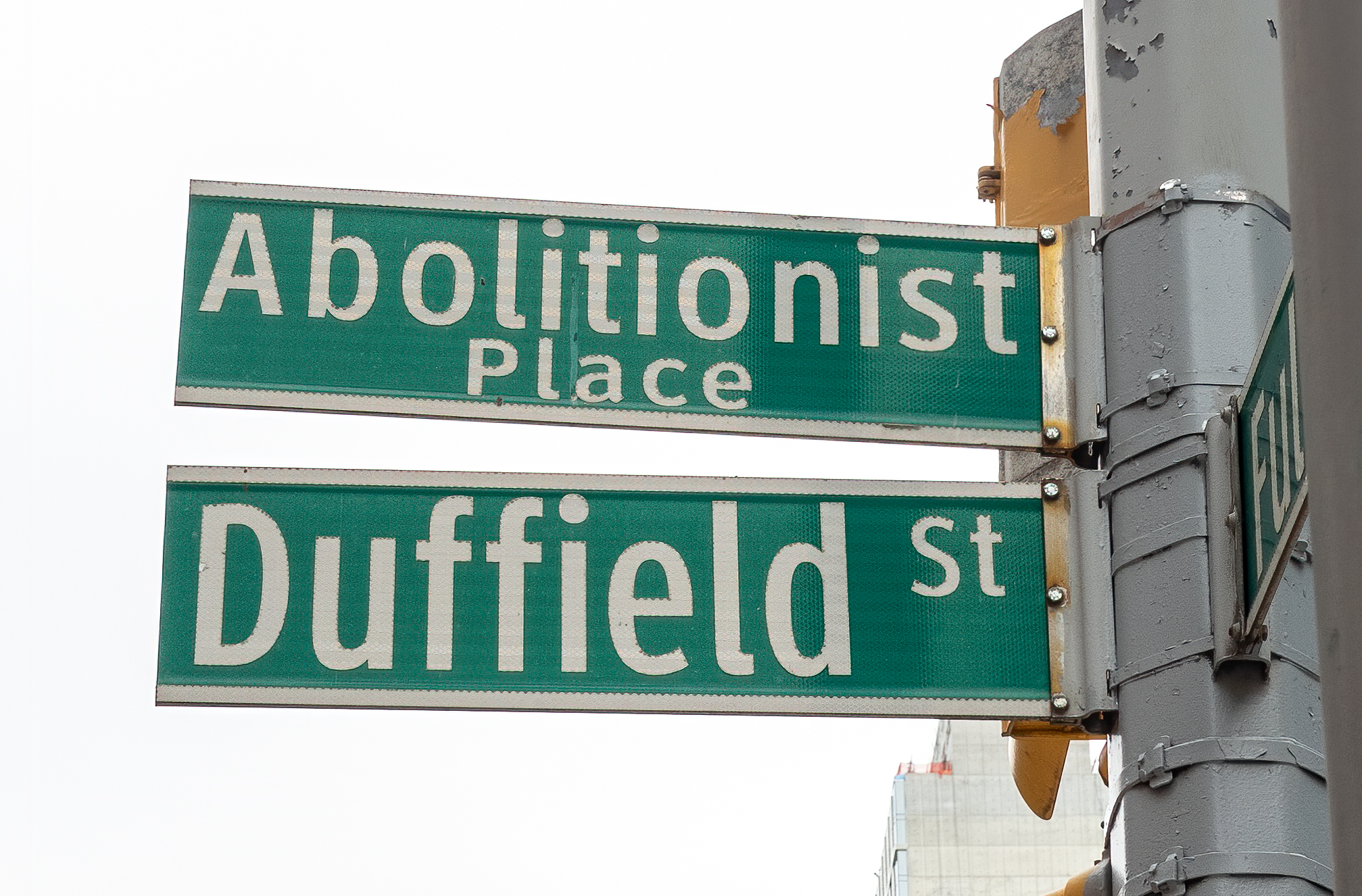
Abolitionist Place street sign above its original name, Duffield Street

Abolitionist Place is an alternative name for a section of Duffield Street in Brooklyn, New York City, United States, which was a significant site of abolitionist activity in the 19th century. Abolitionists Harriet and Thomas Truesdell lived at 227 Duffield Street, which is believed to have been a stop on the Underground Railroad. William Harned, an Underground Railroad conductor, lived at the intersection with Willoughby Street, and stories have been passed down orally of involvement of several houses on the block. Duffield Street is said to be named for John Duffield, a Brooklyn resident and surgeon during the American Revolutionary War.

In the mid-2000s the New York City Economic Development Corporation (NYCEDC) announced plans to use eminent domain to seize and demolish the sites to construct a new public square and underground parking, leading the community to organize in opposition. Amid the pushback, the city renamed the street Abolitionist Place while proceeding with development plans. By 2019, all but one of the sites with claimed abolitionist activity on the street were demolished. The last, 227 Duffield, was designated as a landmark by the New York City Landmarks Preservation Commission in 2021. A public space at the intersection with Willoughby Street, also named Abolitionist Place, is in development as of June 2021.

== Background ==
Brooklyn was an active hub of abolitionism before the Civil War. Slavery was outlawed in New York in 1827, and Brooklyn's waterfront trade with Southern states made it a convenient stop for escaped slaves traveling the Underground Railroad, a network of secret routes and safe houses established to allow enslaved African Americans to escape into free states and Canada. People would come by boat and travel through nearby Underground Railroad stops like Plymouth Church. Some would remain in Brooklyn and others continued north. Because of the Fugitive Slave Act of 1850, which criminalized helping an escaped slave, abolitionist activities at the time were still largely conducted in secret, but stories about Underground Railroad activity in houses and tunnels under Duffield Street between Fulton Street and Willoughby were passed down orally in the community.

== 227 Duffield Street ==
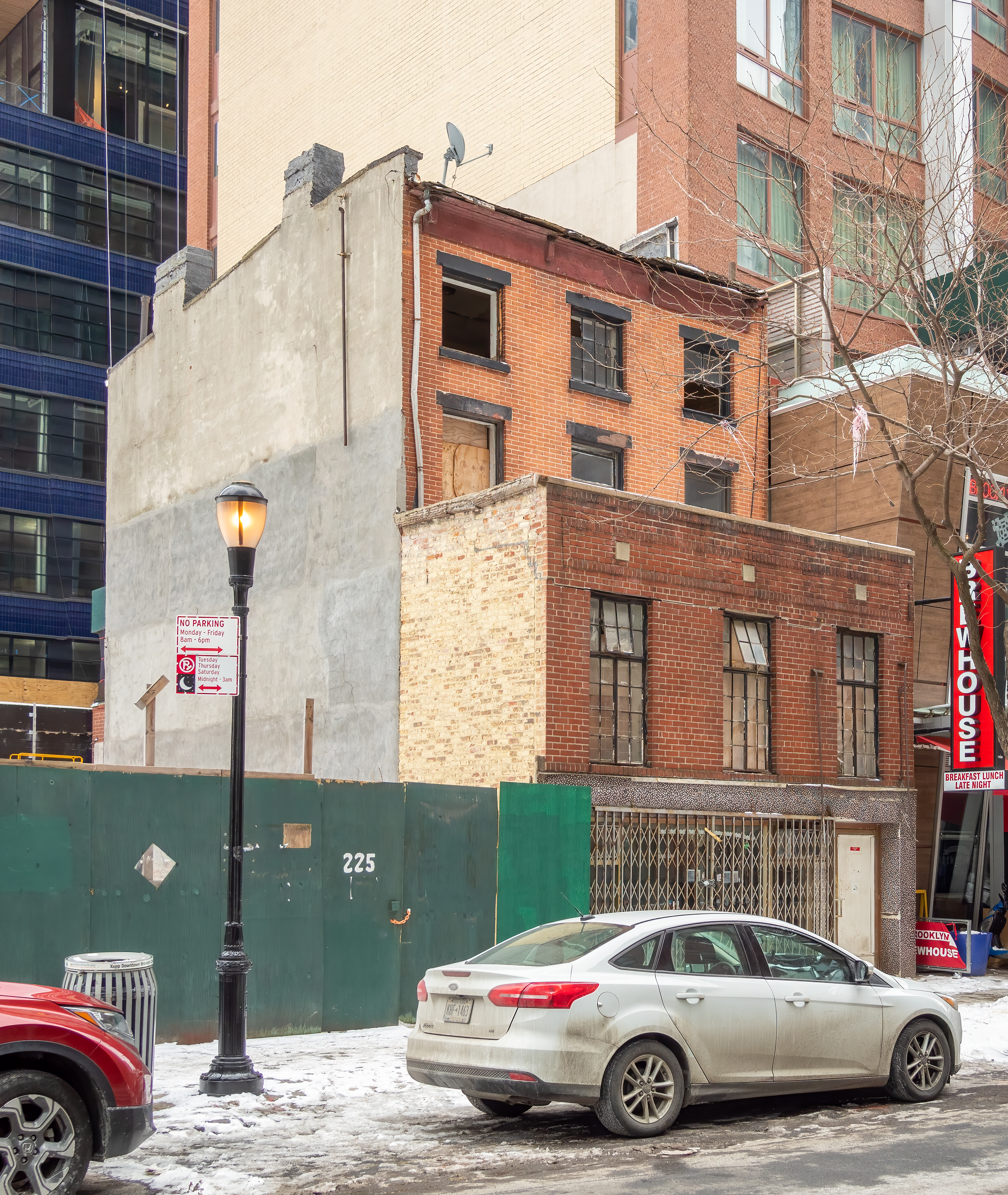
227 Duffield Street in 2021, with new construction on either side

The three-story Greek Revival rowhouse at 227 Duffield Street was built c. 1847–1850 and was home to the abolitionists Harriet and Thomas Truesdell from 1851 to 1863. During this time, it is believed to have been a stop on the Underground Railroad.

Harriet Truesdell and Thomas Truesdell were active abolitionists in New England before moving to Duffield Street. Harriet was an organizer of the Anti-Slavery Convention of American Women in Philadelphia in 1838 and the treasurer of the Providence Ladies Anti-Slavery Society. Thomas was a founding member of the Rhode Island Anti-Slavery Society. Their friend, prominent American abolitionist William Lloyd Garrison, stayed with the couple in Brooklyn before he left to attend the World Anti-Slavery Convention in London.

The belief that the house was an Underground Railroad stop is based on artifacts found in its basement, proximity to other stops like the Bridge Street African Wesleyan Methodist Episcopal Church and Plymouth Church, and a doorway and sealed arch in the basement which lead to a tunnel underneath the building. The claim has not been conclusively verified, possibly due to the secretive nature of the activity which was intentionally not well documented. The ancestors of Joy Chatel's late husband bought 227 directly from the Truesdells. In 1933, owners built an addition to the first two floors, adding a storefront, while the original façade remains visible on the third floor. Chatel owned the property, selling half before her death in 2014 after which her daughter sold the remaining half.

== Other properties ==
Lewis Greenstein, who inherited the house at 233 Duffield Street from his mother in 1992, also made claims of abolitionist activity on that site. Greenstein believes it was a "feeding station" for escaped slaves, based on stories he heard from past tenants. He observed sealed-off exits in his basement and looked into property records sufficient to argue that further study was merited. According to Greenstein in the New York Times, the hidden tunnels underneath what is now Abolitionist Place, including 233 Duffield, and their use by slaves seeking freedom, was "treated as common knowledge".

== Development plans and community activism ==
In 2004, the city announced a large urban renewal plan for Downtown Brooklyn, including redevelopment of the stretch for Duffield Street between Fulton and Willoughby Streets that included 227 and 233. The plan would demolish the existing buildings to create underground parking and a large new public square called Willoughby Park. Property owners received a notice to vacate that year and began working to fight the order, building a case for historical significance, led by the owners of 227 and 233, Joy Chatel and Lewis Greenstein. (The ancestors of the former's late husband had bought 227 directly from the Truesdells.)

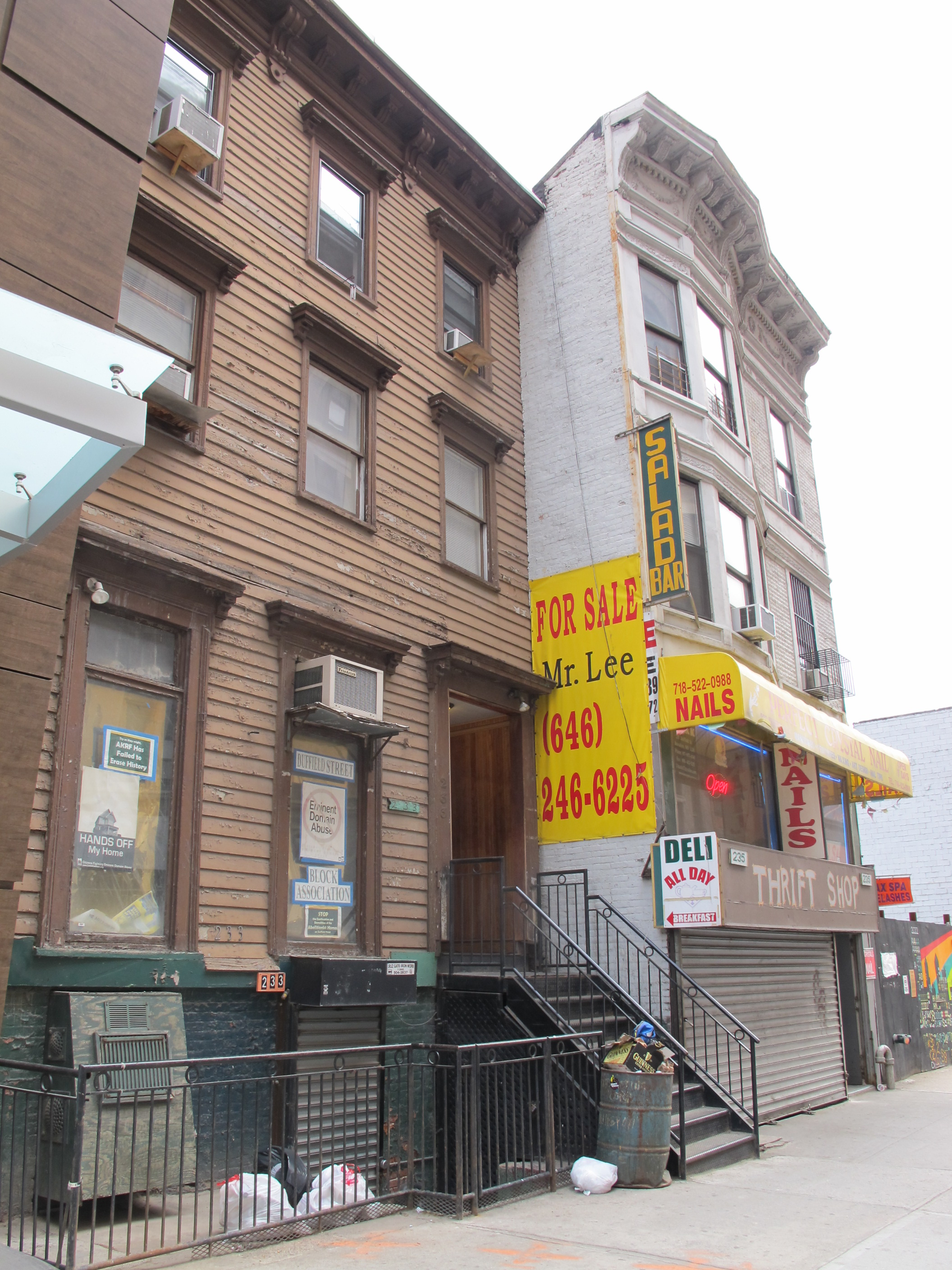
233-235 Duffield Street in 2012, protesting posters can be seen in the windows of No. 233

The city's Economic Development Corporation commissioned a report investigating Underground Railroad activity at the sites (as well as a building on neighboring Gold Street) in support of its development plans. The report, written by the engineering, environmental, and planning consultancy AKRF, presented evidence of tunnels between houses, contradicted a claim previously made by the city that the tunnels were for coal, found abolitionist activity at 227 Duffield, and identified several nearby venues connected to the Underground Railroad. It found that 227 Duffield was "quite possibly involved" with the Underground Railroad but emphasized in its conclusion that there was not sufficient evidence directly connecting the house or any of the sites in the affected area to the Underground Railroad. The conclusion, which justified demolition, was criticized for its standard of evidence regarding an activity that was necessarily clandestine. The report appendix includes a peer review by twelve scholars, eight of whom expressed reservations about the conclusion, citing insufficient archaeological investigation and lack of participation of local abolitionist historians. Archaeologists and members of the Professional Archaeologists of New York City visited the site and described the buildings as "compelling historical documents deserving of preservation."

Controversy escalated in 2007 with the publication of the report and the city's announcement that it would use eminent domain to seize and demolish the buildings. Community members and groups like Families United for Racial and Economic Equality (FUREE) joined Chatel in an effort to preserve the site. Chatel filed a lawsuit through South Brooklyn Legal Services to stop the seizure, which was ultimately successful. Amid the pushback against the use of eminent domain, the administration of Mayor Bloomberg allocated $2 million to panel for efforts honoring abolitionist history and granted Duffield Street an official alternative name of Abolitionist Place.

The renaming did not grant any protection, however, and by 2019, the house at 227 Duffield was the last still standing. As the building fell into disrepair, Chatel sold half of the property. She died in 2014, and her daughter sold the other half, which by then was heavily damaged. In June 2019 the new property owner filed an application to demolish it in order to build a new 13-story mixed-use building in its place. The organizations Circle for Justice Innovations and FUREE, along with community activists, organized in response, pressing for landmark status, and demolition was delayed. Protests continued into 2020, with activists using slogans and hashtags like "Black Landmarks Matter" and "#Save227Duffield". Borough president Eric Adams, Mayor Bill de Blasio, Letitia James, and other politicians expressed support for the landmark designation.

In February 2021, the Landmarks Preservation Commission granted 227 Duffield Street landmark status as the Harriet and Thomas Truesdell House. The following month, the city purchased the building from its owner for $3.2 million (~$3.64 million in 2024).

== Public square ==
Plans for development of a public square along the south side of Willoughby Street between Duffield and Albee Square West, initially called Willoughby Park or Willoughby Square Park, moved forward amid landmark debates. In 2019, a 15,000 square feet (1,400 m^{2}) park space opened on the lot under the name Willoughby Square Pop-Up, intended to be a temporary, simple public space which would be demolished when development of the larger project moved forward.

In January 2021, the city announced a design for Willoughby Square Park by artist Kameelah Janan Rasheed honoring Brooklyn abolitionists, including questions and ideas written in the pavement and on placards, and taking for granted the likely landmark designation of 227 Duffield. At a Public Design Commission meeting, some preservationists and activists criticized the proposal's use of abstraction rather than depicting the historical figures, and the plans were tabled.

Brooklyn Community Board 2, following an initiative led by activist Jacob Morris, called for the space to be renamed Abolitionist Place Park, though later dropped "Park" to avoid confusion with city parkland and associated management. The New York City Economic Development Corporation agreed to the name Abolitionist Place and, in June 2021, allocated $15 million (~$17.1 million in 2024) to the 1.15 acres (0.47 ha) space.

== See also ==
- List of Underground Railroad sites
