= Joy Chatel =

- Chatel in 2007
- Born: July 28, 1947
- Died: January 8, 2014 (aged 66)
- Other name: Mamma Joy Chatel
- Occupations: Activist and community organizer

Joy Chatel (June 28, 1947 – January 8, 2014), also known as Mama Joy, was a cosmetologist, community organizer and activist based in Brooklyn, New York. She fought battles against the Bloomberg administration and millionaire developers to keep the history of anti-slavery organizing from being erased from the Fulton Mall area.

Chatel was also a board member of FUREE (Families United for Racial and Economic Equality). She was able to mobilize people in the community including local politicians and organizations, helping them all recognize the importance of the abolitionist movement in the Downtown Brooklyn area. In 2007, Chatel and the community successfully fought a plan by the city to seize her home at 227 Duffield Street through eminent domain, which would have been used to build a park and underground parking garage.

Chatel died January 8, 2014, from complications with her health at the New York Methodist Hospital in Brooklyn.

== History ==
In 2004, the city of New York passed a major up zoning in the downtown Fulton Mall area of Brooklyn, NY. The plan included 1.8 acres for a new green space in the style of Bryant Park, which the city named Willoughby Square. This space was to be developed partly to attract private investors. “In order to create the park, the city said it would have to condemn Chatel's property, and up to six other homes on Duffield Street and neighboring Gold Street. Preservationists criticized the city for ignoring evidence that the houses were once a stop on the Underground Railroad, the network that helped guide slaves to freedom.”

Chatel's home once belonged to Thomas and Harriet Lee Truesdell, prominent abolitionists in the mid-19th century. Downtown Brooklyn, most notably Plymouth Church on Hicks Street, was at the center of the abolitionist movement in New York City. Chatel and many others believed that her home, as well as 231 Duffield and 436 Gold Street, were stops on the Underground Railroad because the structures were connected by tunnels.

New York City commissioned a study to determine the homes' “historic merit.” The city paid a consulting firm $500,000 for the report. The report, issued in April 2004, declared that the homes were "not part of the Underground Railroad...though the report was repudiated by two thirds of its peer reviewers.” Critics began to cite abuses of eminent domain. There was evidence of a large tunnel underneath Duffield Street. Even though the remnants of a tunnel system are the most persuasive pieces of evidence, the consultants in charge of the investigation "made no attempt to excavate that mysterious tunnel.” One archeologist, Cheryl LaRoche, said at the time that “there is overwhelming evidence…of Abolitionist activity” at Chatel's house.

== Duffield Street ==
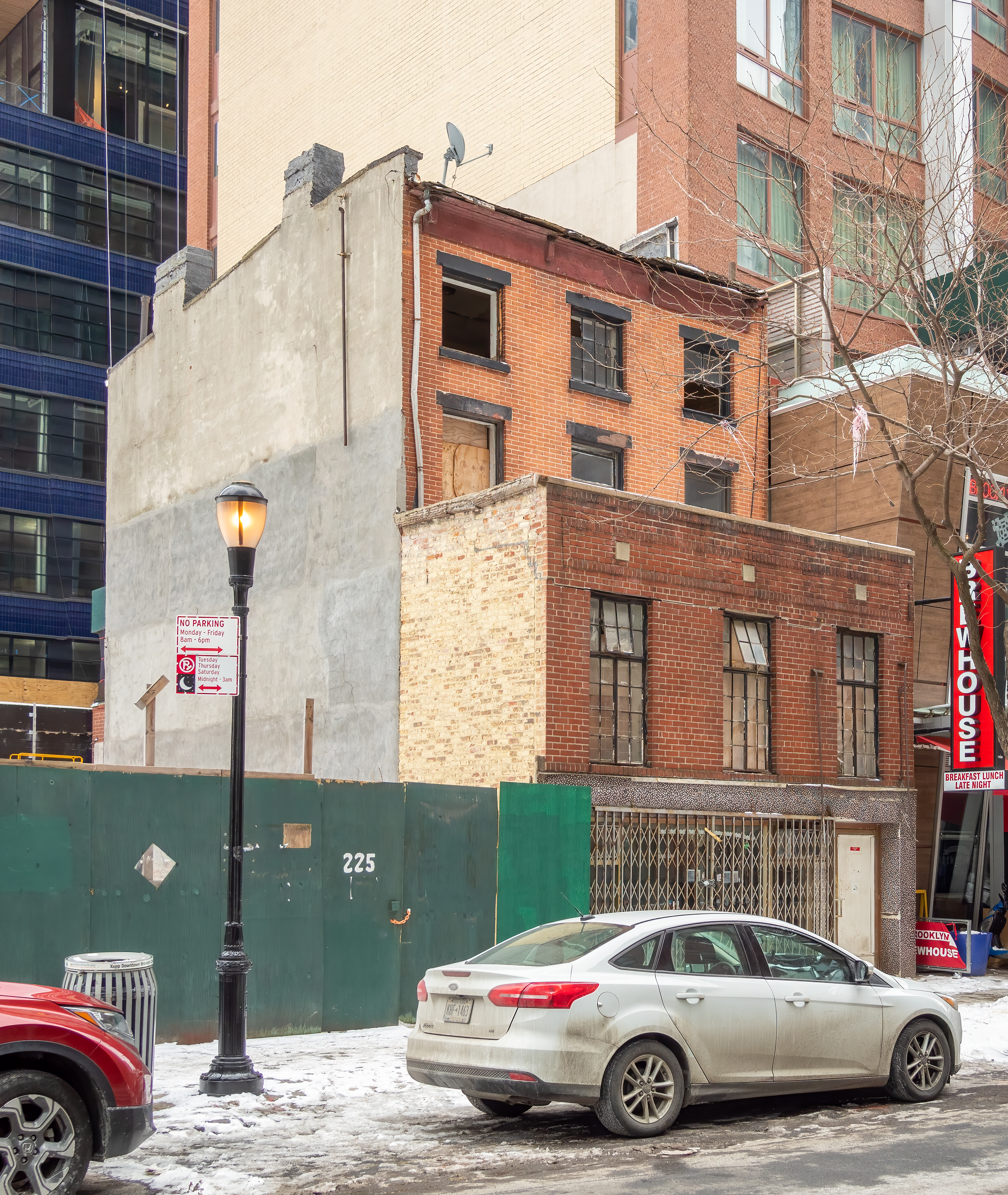
Chatel's house on 227 Duffield Street, now a New York City landmark

Chatel and her neighbor at 223 Duffield Street, Lewis Greenstein, had fought the cities park plan since its announcement in 2004. They both believed their homes were stops on the Underground Railroad. Chatel and Greenstein started organizing together in the spring of 2004 after they learned that their properties were at risk of being seized by the city under eminent domain. There was evidence of a large tunnel underneath Duffield Street. No Subway ever ran below Duffield Street despite the evidence of the large tunnel underneath the homes. The owners of the two buildings believed the tunnels may have served as a secret passage from Duffield Street to the nearby Bridge Street African Wesleyan Methodist Episcopal Church. In the sub-basement of Mr. Greenstein's home there was a capped well and an exit shaft to the surface. Various members of the community including local politicians believed that evidence of the Underground Railroad lay beneath many of the homes on Duffield Street.

In September 2007 the city co-named Duffield Street “Abolitionist Place” and promised two million dollars to commemorate Abolitionist activity on the street. This was an "acknowledgment that [Brooklyn] was a hub of the Underground Railroad: the network of sympathizers and safe house throughout the North that helped as many as 100,000 slaves flee the South before the Civil War.”

In November 2007 Chatel defeated New York State's attempt to use eminent domain to tear down her home at 227 Duffield Street in Brooklyn, NY. Chatel then formed a group called 227 Abolitionist Place. Given the historical context Chatel believed that her home would serve as an ideal location for a museum and heritage center. This group aims to have Chatels home turned into a museum. Before her death, Chatel had said she would like to see her house put to good use, stating "there’s no black museum in Brooklyn to celebrate the Underground Railroad... This is the house to do it in. It’s important that the children and all of the people can see what people had to go through to be free.”

In 2021, Chatel's home at 227 Duffield Street was given landmark status by the Landmarks Preservation Commission as the Harriet and Thomas Truesdell House.

== FUREE ==
Joy Chatel joined the Families United for Racial and Economic Equality in 2004, becoming a leader in FUREE's Accountable Development Campaign and was elected to the board in May 2009. Her special interest in unfair zoning and responsible development was not just about keeping her home but also maintaining the social and cultural fabric of Downtown Brooklyn. The 2004 Downtown Brooklyn rezoning plan resulted in a boom of luxury-dominated development and the massive displacement of low income and working-class people of color as well as small, independently owned businesses.
