= Jacob Morris (activist) =

Jacob Morris (born 1947) is a New York City activist and local historian responsible for many street renamings. He is the head of the Harlem Historical Society and the New York Freedom Trail, an organization which seeks to establish an official government tour of sites connected to the fight against slavery.

== Historical activism ==
Since 2006, Morris has worked diligently to rename and co-name streets after accomplished Black New Yorkers, including Paul Robeson, Ella Baker, Thurgood Marshall, Ida B. Wells, W.E.B. DuBois, Billie Holiday, Count Basie, Frederick Douglass, Susan Smith McKinney, Zora Neale Hurston, A'Lelia Walker, and James Brown. He told the New York Daily News, "Basically, you know, blacks have been living on streets named after famous white persons for 400 years, maybe a little more. So, you know, why not have white people live on streets named after famous black people who did so much to contribute to American history?"

The New York Times wrote that he showed "nonstop zeal" to advance these projects through the local system of community boards. Many of naming efforts have been related to Black women. He also claimed to have a sense of urgency given gentrification in black neighborhoods such as Harlem.

He also advocates on other issues related to public history in New York City. Scholar David Levering Lewis told the New York Times, “Almost every month Jacob finds a reason to be agitated, excited, outraged and militant, and usually he’s quite right in his concerns.” A primary task, given an interest in the Underground Railroad, is to establish a "Freedom Trail" that would mark key places related to the fight against slavery -- Underground Railroad sites and sites links to abolitionists. This effort would be inspired by the successful Freedom Trail in Boston that is connected to the Revolutionary War.

Many of these proposed sites, such as the home of David Ruggles at 36 Lispenard Street and the place where Elizabeth Jennings Graham was thrown off a street car, are in Lower Manhattan.

Morris said that the trail plan "tells the truth about where we come from and the path we've taken to get to where we are today. We need to know this stuff: the adversity, the things that were surmounted." Council member Ydanis Rodriguez introduced City Council legislation for a taskforce to study the matter, and the plan received support from Community Board 1 under Julie Menin.

In 2006, he worked with Roger Green, an activist from Crown Heights, to co-name a stretch of Duffield Street, near where Abolitionist Place. In 2019, while opposing the treatment by New York City Economic Development Corporation for a memorial to abolitionism, he led efforts to rename the proposed park, Willoughby Square, to Abolitionist Place Park., and the plan received support from Community Board 1 under Julie Menin.

Morris also opposed some of the projects of the administration of Mayor Bill de Blasio related to monuments. He opposed public funding for the Women's Rights Pioneers Monument in Central Park before it was changed to include Sojourner Truth. Even then, he wrote a letter to make sure the addition would be historically accurate and appropriate.

He also criticized the de Blasio administration for the placement of some its announced monuments, including for Elizabeth Jennings Graham, Billie Holiday, and the family of Albro Lyons and Mary Lyons.

Another goal of Morris is to name a street after Maya Angelou.

== Family history ==
Morris was born in 1947 in Astoria, Queens. His family was Jewish Greek. The New York Times reported that almost all of his family was killed in the Holocaust due to the Nazi occupation of Greece. In the 1970s, Morris worked in real estate and owned different properties in SoHo, including a video rental chain called "Rare Bird." His tenants implemented a rent strike, forcing him in the 1990s to declare bankruptcy.

While his son Lincoln was in school, Morris started to get involved in politics when he learned that New York City public schools did not have to include in their reports the scores of students assigned as learning disabled.
