= Gonzalo Casals =

Commissioner of the New York City Department of Cultural Affairs
- In office March 11, 2020 – March 18, 2022
- Mayor: Bill De Blasio; Eric Adams
- Preceded by: Tom Finkelpearl
- Succeeded by: Laurie Cumbo

Personal details
- Born: Gonzalo E. Casals; November 21, 1974 (age 51)

Gonzalo E. Casals (born November 21, 1974) is an Argentine-American museum director and professor based in New York City. He is the former Commissioner of the New York City Department of Cultural Affairs, and previously held the executive director position at the Leslie-Lohman Museum of Art in New York. He was the Vice President of Programs and Community Engagement at Friends of the High Line, as well as the Deputy and Interim Director of El Museo del Barrio in East Harlem. He is a resident of Jackson Heights, Queens.

== Early life and education ==
Casals was raised in Buenos Aires, Argentina. Casals studied design and architecture at the Universidad de Belgrano. In 2002, he immigrated to New York City, where he received a Masters of Art History and Museum Studies from the City College of New York City and a Masters in Urban Affairs and Neighborhood and Community Development from Hunter College.

== Career ==
Casals has been part of the CreateNYC public engagement team and the New York City Mayoral Advisory Commission on City Art, Monuments, and Markers. While leading the Leslie-Lohman Museum of Art, Casals transformed the museum, that often focussed on white cis gay men and their art, into a more diverse space for the LGBTQ+ community. Casals focused on the works of art by LGBTQ artists, people of color, women, trans people, and those with intersecting identities. Casals has supported a number of major exhibitions: including the New York edition of the exhibition, "Art After Stonewall, 1969–1989"; a retrospective of the experimental filmmaker, Barbara Hammer; and a survey show on "queer abstraction." As Director, Casals rebranded the Leslie-Lohman Museum of Art, dropping the "gay and lesbian" titled that was part of the museum name prior. He broadened education programming and opened up the museum's archives and libraries to artists and researchers. He has held teaching positions at the City University of New York, Yale University and New York University.

Civic offices
Preceded by Kathleen Hughes (acting)	Commissioner of the New York City Department of Cultural Affairs; 2020–2022	Succeeded by Laurie Cumbo
