= Museum of Contemporary African Diasporan Arts =

Museum in Brooklyn, New York

Coordinates: 40°41′7″N 73°58′27.5″W

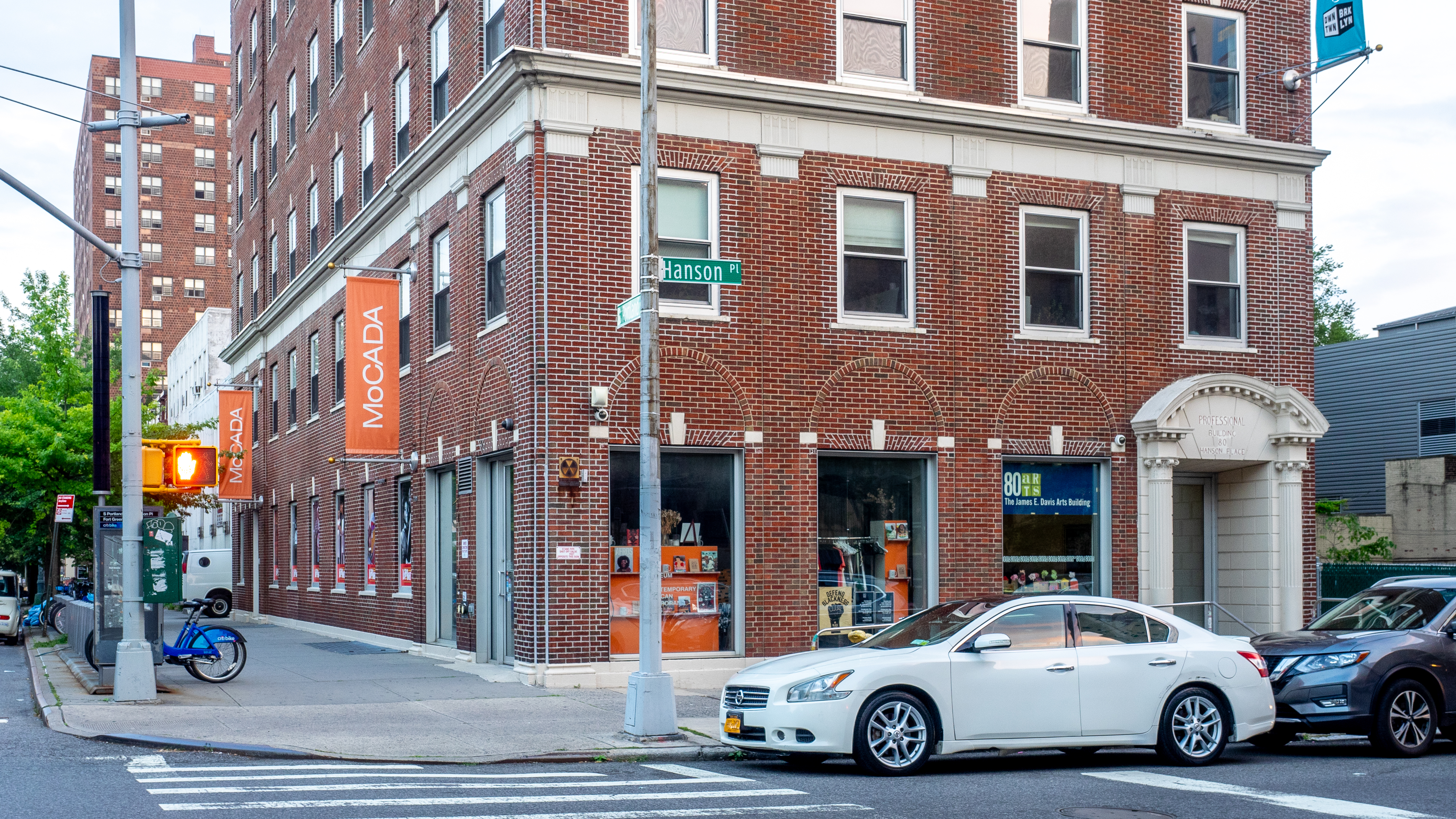
The Museum's former site ("Culture Lab") at 80 Hanson Place, shown in 2019.

The Museum of Contemporary African Diasporan Arts (MoCADA), is Brooklyn's first and only contemporary art museum dedicated to the art and culture of Africa and its diaspora. Since 2023, the museum has operated within an expanded campus which includes three venues:

- Culture Lab II, the flagship gallery, performance space, giftshop, and cafe, located at 10 Lafayette Avenue, Brooklyn, NY 11217

- Ubuntu Garden, a community garden + public art space, which is located at 48 Lafayette Avenue, Brooklyn, NY 11217

- Abolition House, a seasonal art residency on Governors Island, located at House 7A Nolan Park, Governors Island, NY 10004

== History ==
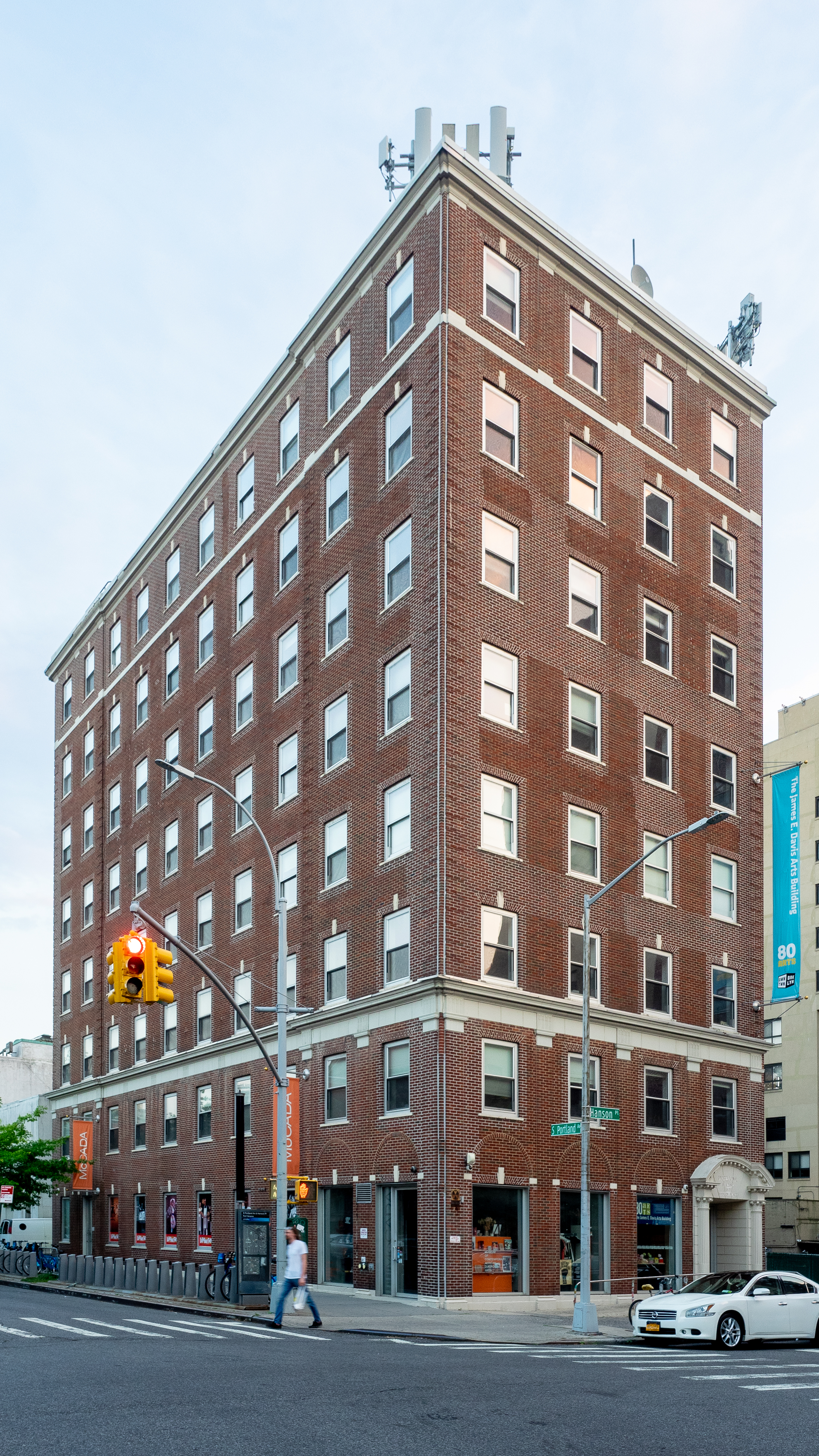

MoCADA was founded in 1999 by Laurie Cumbo in a building owned by the historical Bridge Street AWME Church in the heart of Bedford–Stuyvesant, Brooklyn.

In 2006, MoCADA moved to an expanded space called Culture Lab on the ground floor of the James E. Davis 80 Arts Building (80 Hanson Place) in Fort Greene, a historically black middle-class neighborhood in Brooklyn which is part of the Brooklyn Cultural District. On December 4, 2019, construction began on a new facility, the L10 Arts and Cultural Center, which would contain a new home for MoCADA as well as new branches of other institutions like Brooklyn Academy of Music (BAM) and the Brooklyn Public Library. The Culture Lab on Hanson Place closed on March 31, 2024, and the new location, dubbed Culture Lab II, opened in January 2025.

== Exhibitions ==
Saying No: Reconciling Spirituality and Resistance in Indigenous Australian Art is an exhibition curated by Australian artist Bindi Cole. Based on Cole's previous exhibition in Australia, Saying No combines the religious ceremonial practices highlighted by Indigenous artist with the protest for Indigenous rights and visibility in the public imagaination. The curatorial statement is as follows: "The word 'no' does not exist in the Australian Aboriginal languages. Where it does exist, this powerful word is reserved for the elders and is used with great care and ceremony. As these languages reach the brink of extinction, indigenous Australian artists are using contemporary art to assert their identity and culture and say no to racism, land theft and colonialism in an urban world. Saying No features sculpture, installation, painting, photography, video, audio and mixed media works." Some of the exhibiting artists include Tony Albert, Vicki Couzens, Fiona Foley, Daniel Boyd and Maree Clarke.

== Community outreach ==
In 2012, the museum landed a $100,000 grant from the Rockefeller Foundation to pay for a two-year program that brought monthly concerts to public spaces in NYCHA Houses like Walt Whitman, Ingersoll, and Farragut in Fort Greene, Brooklyn. The concert series, titled "Public Exchange," attracted talented musicians and drew crowds up to 500 or 600. The following year in 2013, MoCADA launched another art performance series, Soul of Brooklyn, which is "a series of block-party style arts events meant to bring the community together and promote local businesses."

From 2001 to 2011, Cumbo served as a graduate professor in the Arts and Cultural Management program at Pratt Institute's School of Art & Design.

== Controversy ==
In 2014, now-city councilmember Laurie Cumbo designated $1.4 million, her largest capital budget allocation, to MoCADA, which she founded and directed before winning a position on city council. This was matched by the same amount of money in the city's executive budget for the 2015 fiscal year. While technically not illegal, Capital New York noted, her support for the museum is "notable chiefly for the sizable, seven-figure contribution, and for her personal closeness to the recipient organization." The blog reported that for most city council members, "the allocations reported on their conflict-of-interest forms were a fraction of the one to MoCADA." The executive director of Citizens Union, a nonpartisan government watchdog group, said the action “raises questions about why she alone would fund an organization that she founded....It smacks of showing favoritism, in a way that almost crosses the line."

== See also ==
- Culture of New York City
