= Vadis Turner =

American mixed media artist

Vadis Turner (born 1977) is an American mixed media artist living in Tennessee. Her work encourages “the misbehaviors of domestic materials.” Exploring “the expressive possibilities of the grid," many works are titled after maligned female figures.

"My content often draws from tragic heroines from Greek mythology, literature and shared experiences from different generations of women. I partner these stories with domestic materials that have the potential to speak in some way…allowing them to transcend their intended functions, contradict their structural natures and betray traditional gender associations."

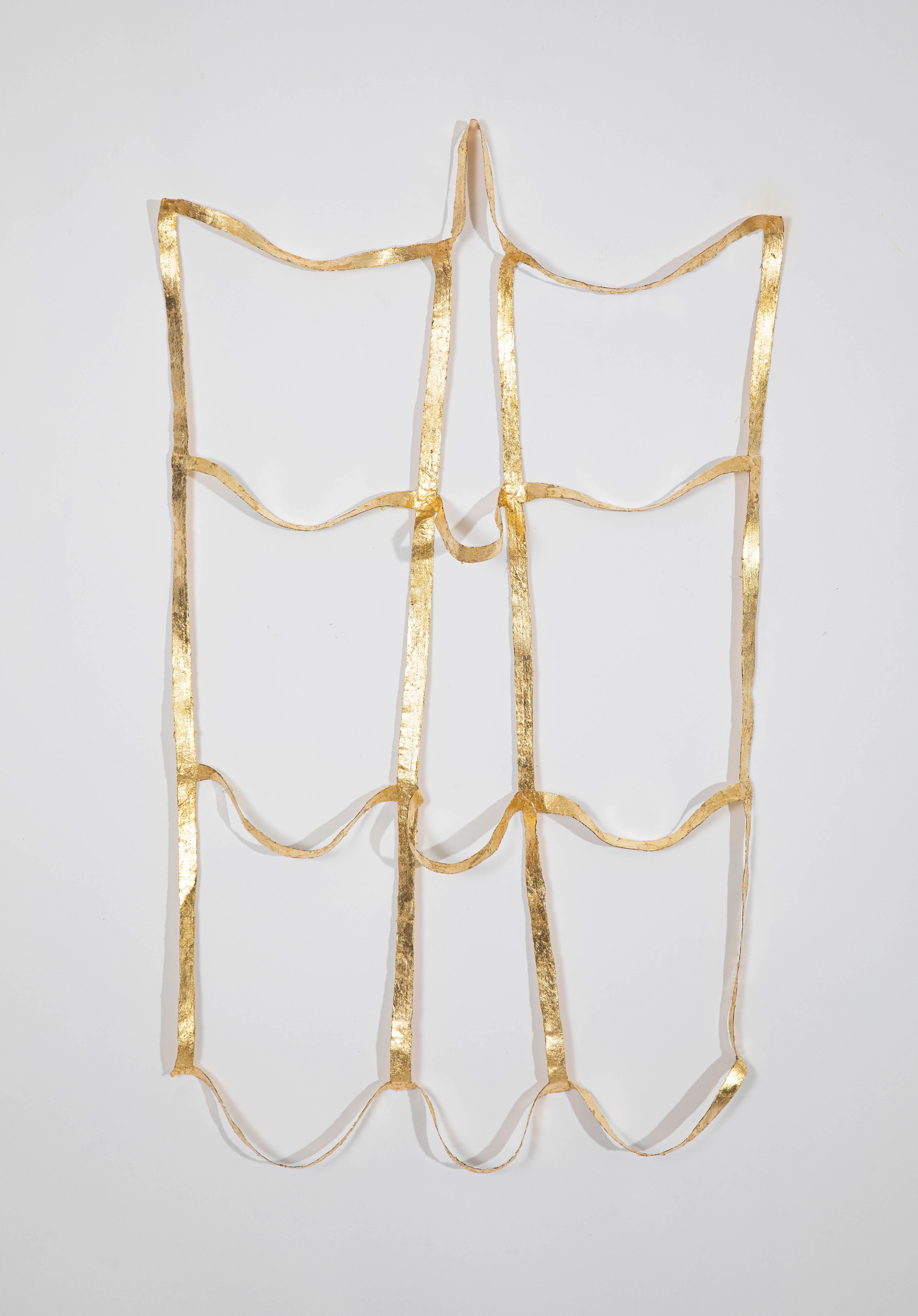
Pluck (2023)32 x 20 x 3 inches Curtains, thread, metal leaf, archival adhesive

"Mannerist distortion is the ancestor of Surrealist fantasy, and Turner’s female grids—the distortion bespeaks their tragedy--are surrealist fantasies with an expressionistic twist." - Donald Kuspit, She Drank Gold Catalogue essay

Turner has had solo shows at the Frist Art Museum, TN; Huntsville Museum of Art, AL; University of Colorado, Colorado Springs, CO; and the Abroms-Engel Institute for Visual Arts at the University of Alabama at Birmingham, AL.

Her group shows include the Museum of Arts and Design, NY; Brooklyn Museum, NY; The Andy Warhol Museum, PA; The Bunker Artspace, FL; Kentucky Museum of Arts and Crafts, KY; 21C Museum Hotels, TN; Hunter Museum of American Art, TN; Institute of Contemporary Art at Maine College of Art & Design, ME; Minnesota Museum of American Art, MN; Islip Art Museum, NY; Knoxville Art Museum, TN; Susquehanna Museum of Art, PA; and Cheekwood Museum, TN.

Her works are in the permanent collections of several museums, including the 21C Museum, KY; Brooklyn Museum, NY; Kentucky Arts and Crafts Museum, KY; Tennessee State Museum, TN; University of Alabama, AL; Huntsville Museum of Art, AL; Hunter Museum of American Art, TN; The Bunker Artspace, FL; and Egon Schiele Art Centrum, Czech Republic.

== Early life and education ==
Turner was born in Nashville, Tennessee in 1977. She enrolled in a five-year program at Boston University, receiving her BFA in Painting in 1999 and her MFA in Studio Teaching in 2000. Her mixed-media work began "with experimenting with the sculptural possibilities of with wax paper from her mother’s kitchen."

== Teaching ==
Turner taught art at Pratt Institute in Brooklyn, NY as a Visiting Instructor from 2004 – 2008, an Adjunct Instructor from 2008 – 2012, and an Adjunct Associate Professor from 2012 – 2014. She has been a Lecturer of Art at Vanderbilt University in Nashville, TN since 2022.

== Early career ==
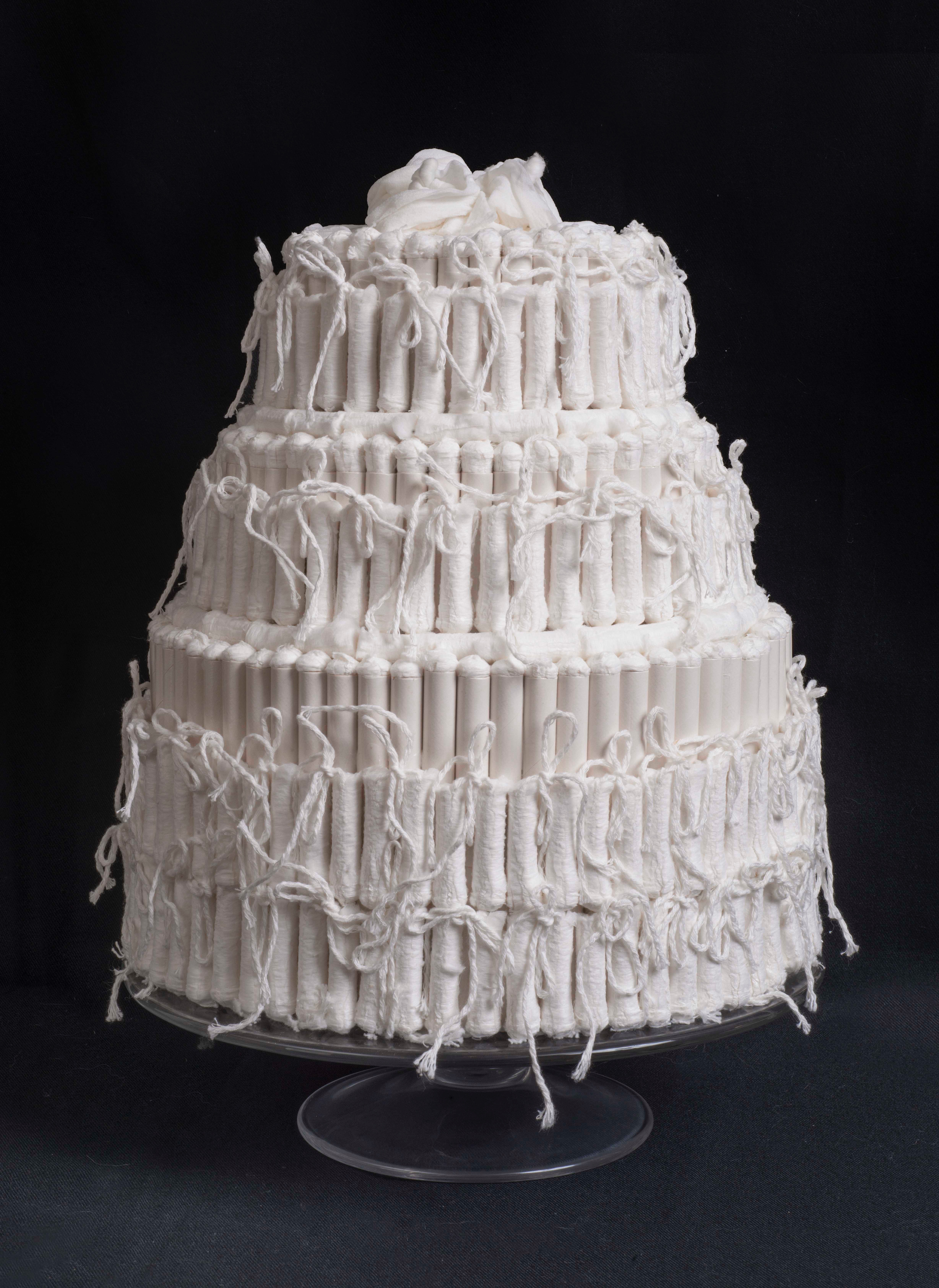
Tampon Wedding Cake (2007)

During her years in New York, Turner manipulated domestic and feminine materials so that they would defy behavioral expectations and speak in new ways. Her "early practice involved making confrontational sculptures from nontraditional items, such as wax paper lingerie and a tampon wedding cake, in a vein similar to that of feminist artists during the late 1960s and ’70s."

"Vadis Turner, Tennessee born and current New York City artist, revamps the notion of handmade objects as they are incorporated in a defining and contradiction of conventional gender roles. Her mixed media pieces achieve an intricate, colorful and at times elegant pronouncement on matters feminine and are reverentially transcendental."

"Vadis Turner’s impassioned deconstructions... This is logical development from her longstanding feminist commitments. She has long sought to acknowledge what is at stake in rites of passage. …… The work that results is vital not because it is messy or gestural or expressive (though it is all of those things) but, rather, because of its keen psychological insight – because it is embedded in shared experience." - Glenn Adamson, Crafts Magazine, UK 2017 (about tampon wedding cake)

In 2009, Turner presented a series of contemporary heirlooms, Dowry, at Lyons Weir Gallery, NYC. Instead of using Dowry as "an offering of culturally valuable goods to socially advance a woman through marriage," Turner sold and traded it for her own professional gain. The body of work culminated in an installation, Reception, which was acquired by the Brooklyn Museum.

Turner has been described as striving for the "transcendence of the commonplace from its intended function into a vehicle for social commentary."

In 2012, Turner had a collaborative residency with Saya Woolfalk at the Museum of Arts and Design. In 2013, Turner was chosen as a resident artist by Materials for the Arts, where she created mixed media pieces with fashion industry textile scraps. MFTA described Turner's work as "'paint[ing]' with ribbon and fabric"; "She uses ribbons as lines, marks, and brushstrokes, large wads of fabric as stains of color, and smaller pieces as drips of hues."

"My compositions are created from partnering female characters with their changing environments."

"I like to invent alternative endings and afterlives for tragic female characters from literature. Ophelia and Eve are two examples."

"Turner slyly translates expressive exertions associated often with macho abstract painting into the anxieties of personal adornment that the culture at large encourages us - women especially - to experience. In doing this, she achieves a sort of social satire, possibly with a vein of self-criticism entwined in it, while fully satisfying a viewer's hope of seeing something generously, attentively and unpredictably invented."

Turner was awarded a Joan Mitchell Painters and Sculptors Grant in 2016.

== Exhibitions ==
Tempest, Frist Art Museum, TN

"Her first museum show, Tempest, simultaneously celebrates and challenges traditional female roles by examining three archetypal phases of a woman's life — the young Wild Woman, the Mother, and the Elder."

"I am especially drawn to textiles that were made by previous generations of women, so I buy damaged hand-sewn quilts on eBay. I like the idea of reinventing the future of unwanted pieces that were made with time and care." – Vadis Turner

"Turner has explored the concept of the female body serving as a vessel—for a time fertile and full, then dormant and empty. She sees a correlation between a bell and a womb, which are both objects of potential even when not activated. Like the American sculptor and printmaker Kiki Smith, Turner periodically uses the body and bodily fluids to express matters related to sex, birth, and regeneration. Her artworks on motherhood include floor-based ‘puddles’ of breast milk (her own) and acrylic paint, preserved in resin."

Megaliths, Ent Center for the Arts, University of Colorado, Colorado Springs, CO

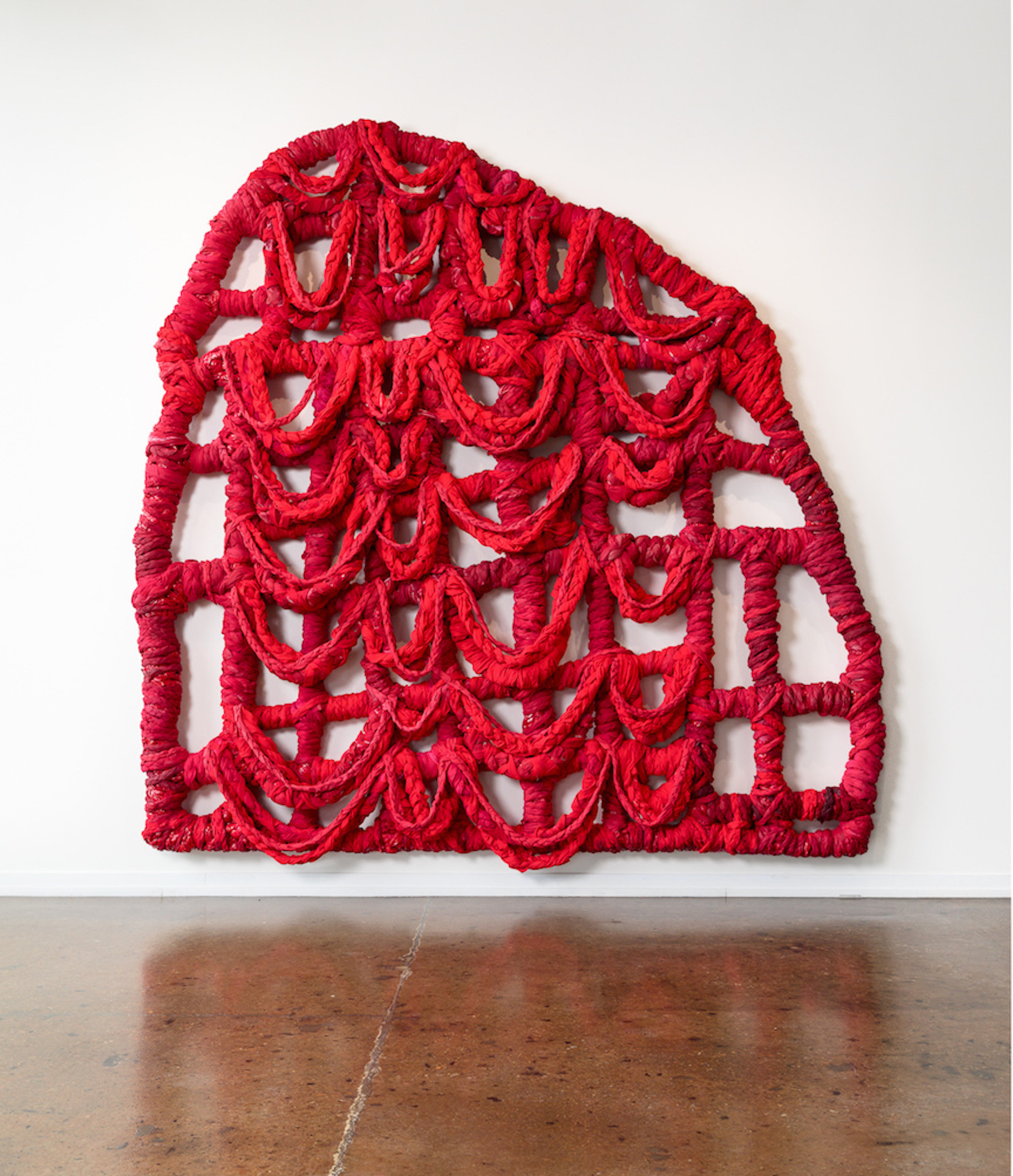
Red Gate (2018) 118 x 120 x 10 inchesBraided bedsheets, dye, acrylic, resin, wood, mixed media

"….created specifically for the UCCS Galleries of Contemporary Art solo exhibition Megaliths, Turner investigates the Neolithic era and the shift from a hunter-gatherer society to one centered around agriculture and cultivation/control of the natural world. In this most recent body of work, Turner’s works inhabit and claim both the walls and the floor of the gallery."

Megaliths is composed of four sculptures created entirely of braided bedsheets and their own mixtures of adhesives, dyes and other materials: Cumulus Megalith, Ghost Megalith, Undressed Stones Somewhere Between Unraveling and Revelation and Red Gate.

Daisy McGowan, director and chief curator for GOCA, wrote in a statement: "Through this body of work, Turner seeks to upend assumptions of masculine versus feminine materials by melding domestic materials like bedsheets with what the artist refers to as ‘macho’ forms and shapes."

Cups and Grids, Geary, NY

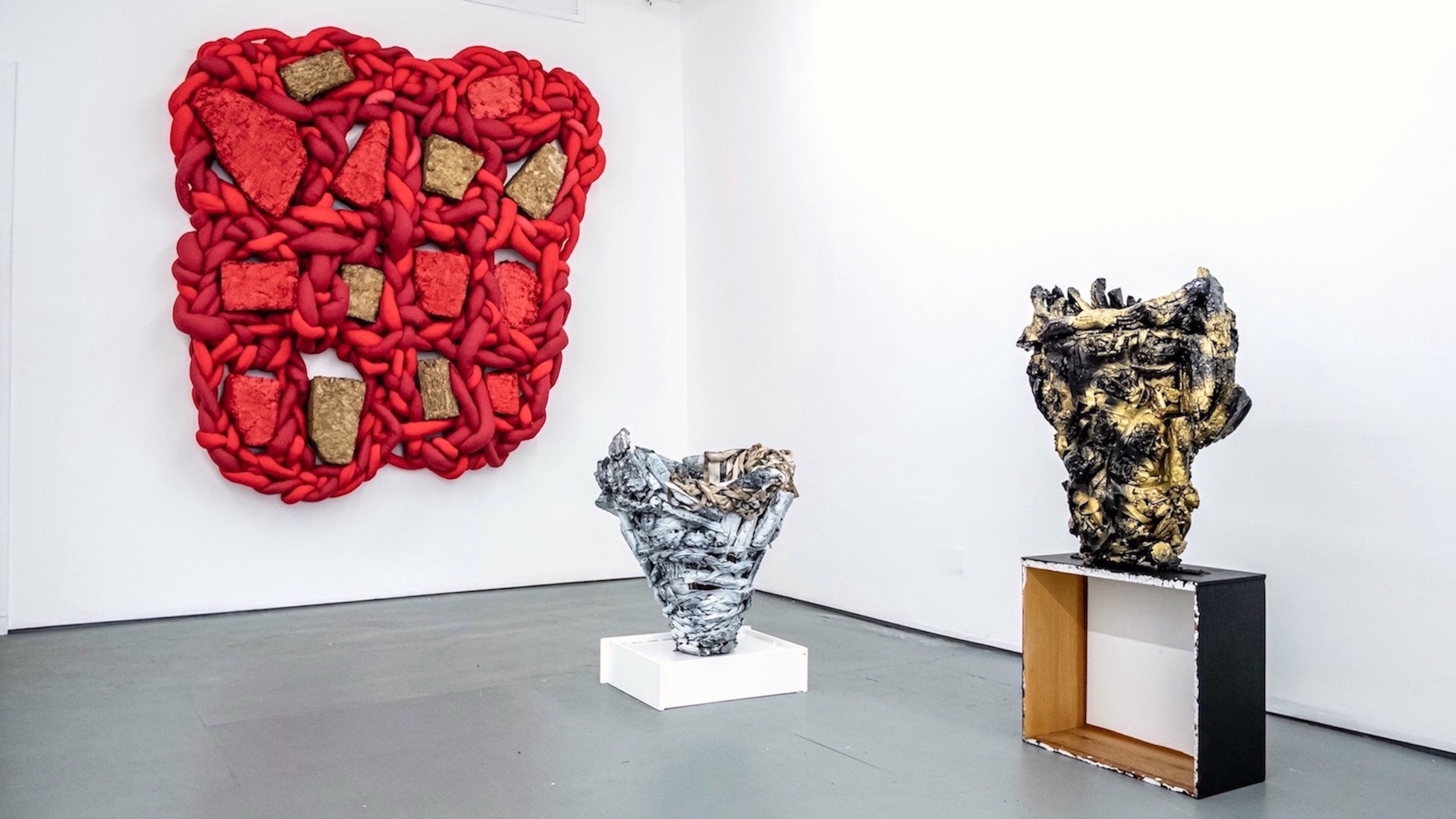
Cups and Grids, Geary, NYC (2020)

“The exhibition Cups and Grids brings the...work of Vadis Turner, a beacon in the Southern contemporary art firmament, to Geary in downtown New York. The presentation includes large-scale, mixed media wall sculptures made primarily of resin and cement, leather and cloth, and three-dimensional vessels comprised of charred wood, paint, and braided bedsheets. Turner’s pieces harken to the visceral and conceptual qualities of art made in the area in late the 1960s and early ‘70s. This was a time of deep interrogation and subversion of the anti-expressive nature of Minimalist pursuits—particularly the grid—and when materiality, as well as decorative and craft-based media, were being championed primarily by female artists.”

“Indeed, the works on view in the exhibition might not have been conceived—or at least given merit today—were it not for the consciousness-raising artistic efforts of Hammond, Eva Hesse, Joan Snyder, Howardena Pindell, and others of this earlier era. In her visceral and conceptual use of materials, and her embrace of the decorative, the romantic, and the bodily, Turner is clearly the daughter of this very rebellious revolution.”

Encounters, Huntsville Museum of Art, AL

“In Encounters, Vadis Turner converses in the language of bed sheets, charged with the memory of distilled human energy and content in the mess. The new large-scale, textile-focused works featured in the exhibition expand on the artist’s previous flirtations with the grid as a structural arrangement, method, and figure. Both on and off the wall, Turner’s pieces offer ample space for reflections on material contradictions, specifically as they relate to the expectations, functions, and limiting assumptions placed on the South’s crafts and its craft makers. Encounters vehemently embraces the maxim that constraints are points of departure, as observed in Turner’s creation of windows we cannot see through, vessels that refuse to hold, and curtains built to let the light in.

The vessel acts as another hallmark in Turner’s creative practice. In these works, the grid reaches a fever pitch, becoming hyper-materialized. The artist manipulates the grid as figure itself—it is lines and holes, horizons and axes, mesh, gauze, panels, and webbing. When one realizes the grid’s capacity as a field that one can fall through, balance on, and weave between, the ‘failure’ of the vessels—that is, their unapologetic porosity—becomes a testament to their creative possibilities.”

She Drank Gold, Abroms-Engel Institute for the Visual Arts at the University of Alabama, Birmingham

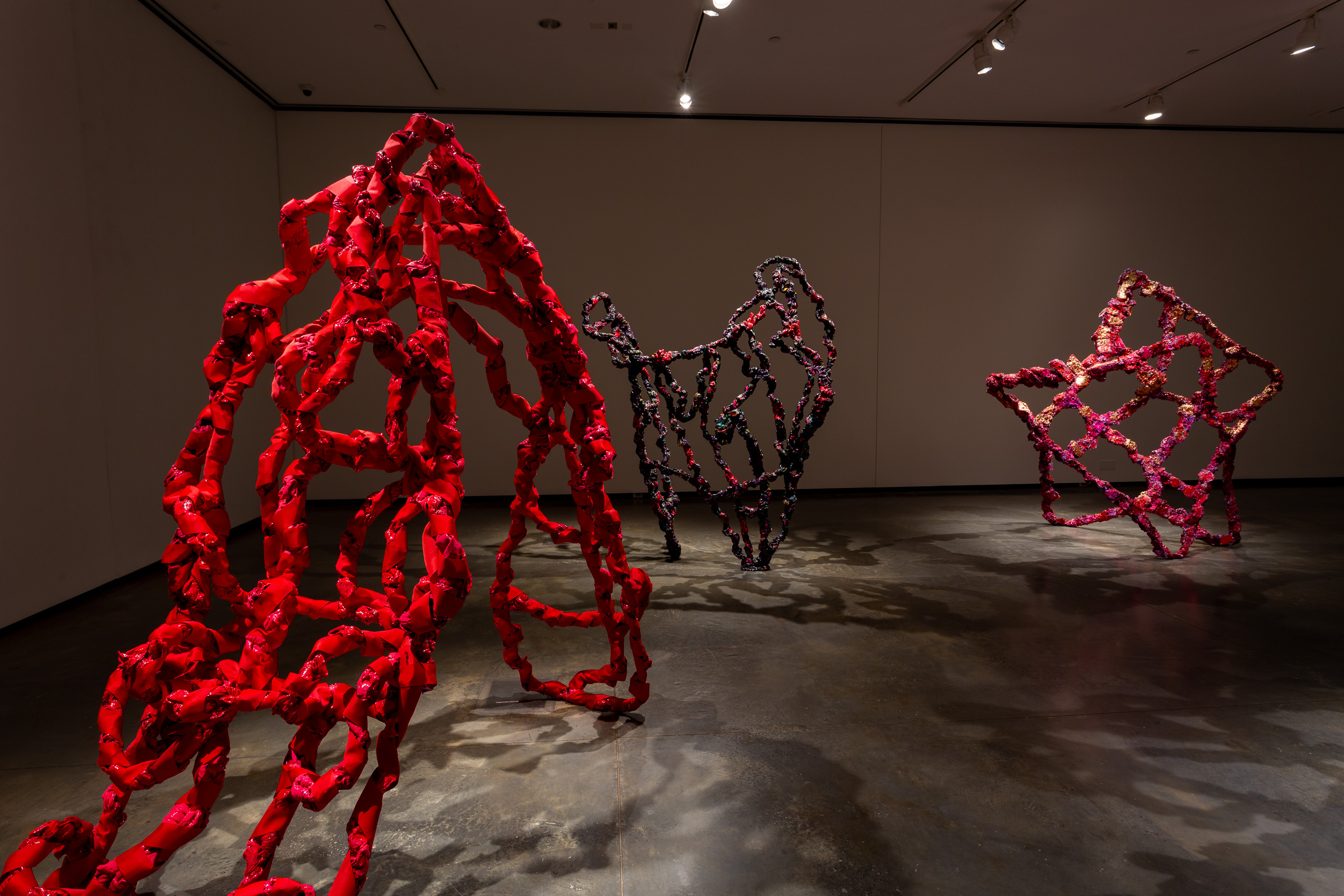
She Drank Gold marks the debut of Turner’s "hysterical grids." Though her work has historically explored "the expressive possibilities of the grid," Turner noted, "now these figures are in this hysterical dance." A small informational background on Matisse's "Dance" (1910) at the show illustrates how this work informed the exhibition, down to its arrangement.

"At various times times throughout human history, drinking gold was a relatively common practice for those seeking eternal youth. Artist Vadis Turner uses this misguided tradition and several stories of mythological, historical and literary female outcasts as a loose conceptual foundation for her AEIVA exhibition, She Drank Gold....Turner references historical notions of female hysteria and ostracism, the expressive formalism of the grid in art, and the physical properties of metal."

"Vadis Turner...known for painting with ribbon and fabric, among other materials associated with women holds her own with such innovative female weavers as Anni Albers, Gunta Stolzl, Marli Ehrman, all Bauhaus masters. They gave credibility to weaving as high art—modernist art. Their works are pure abstractions, unequivocally geometric, lack social import, and are gender neutral. They stand for nothing but their aesthetic selves. They are triumphs of classical modernism. In sharp contrast, Turner’s woven grids, however abstract, are paradoxically representational, for each and every one, whether two- or three-dimensional, symbolizes a female figure, a tragic heroine or female outcast, as Turner says, a mythical victim of patriarchal society."

"Turner’s tragic women may be blackened by male fear expressed as hatred, but inwardly they are pure gold, as the gold grid that accompanies them suggests. Turner’s gold grid is a sacred icon. Her black grid is a profaned icon. The grid is a union of opposites, a matrix of parallel horizontal and vertical lines that form a seamless whole. Turner’s undistorted golden grid is a symbol of woman in all her radiant perfection. It is worth emphasizing that the golden grid is a sublime square--a symbol of perfection, composed of small squares, all equally perfect--ideal. It is slightly tarnished, and bent, but it remains intact, immutable, what philosophers call an eternal object or transcendental form."

"Hysteria arises not only from sheer sensation itself but from the anguish of feeling unheard. By reanimating and, in some case, giving voice to these forlorn outcasts, She Drank Gold doesn’t just honor their archetypal import — the exhibition allows them a chance to heal us all by raging, dancing, and laughing, flourishing in America's greatest historical crucible for change."

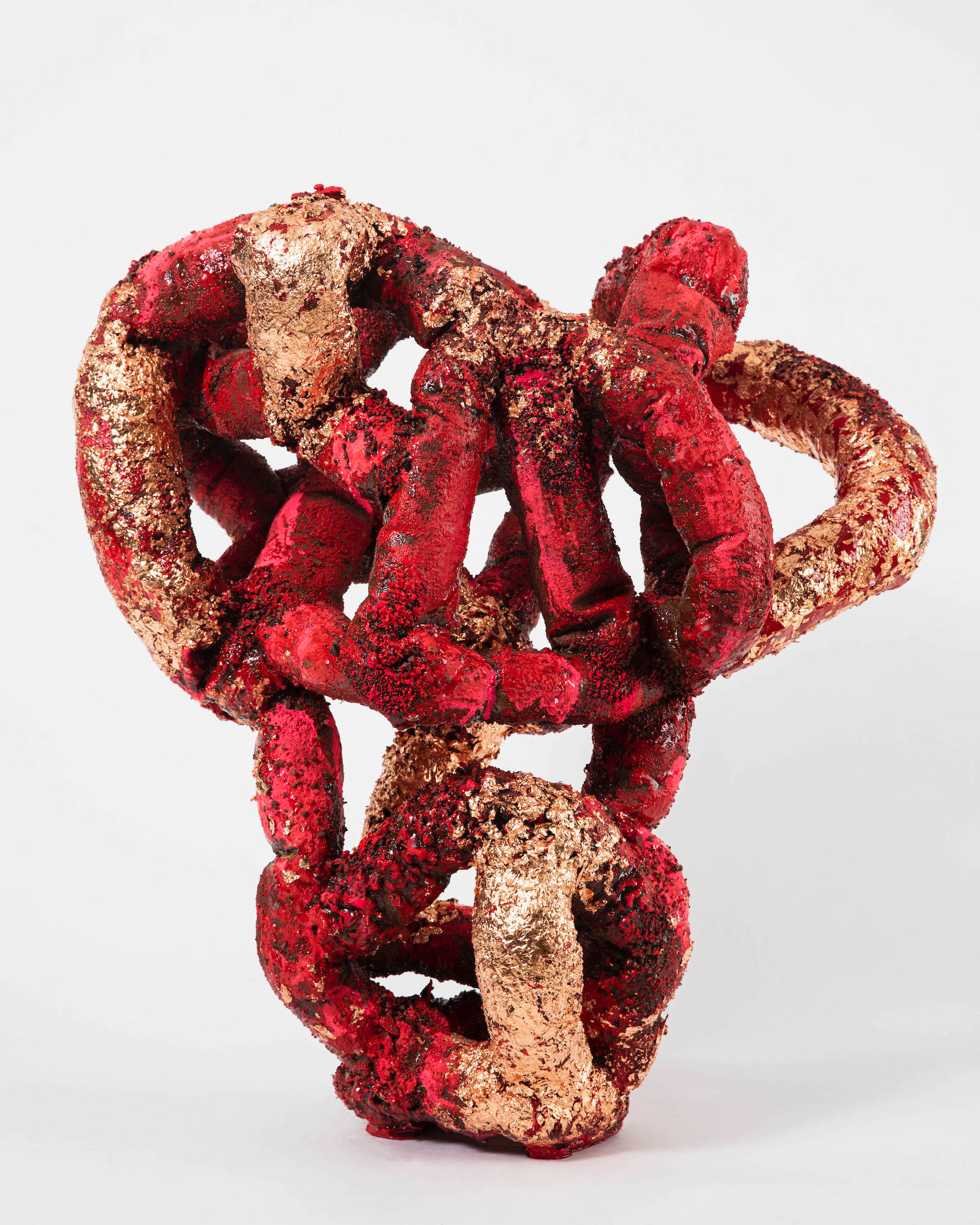
Red Relic Vessel (2022)23 x 22 x 16 inches Bedsheets, brick dust, resin, acrylic, gravel, metal leaf, Polyfil and mixed media

Craft Front and Center, Museum of Arts and Design, NY

In 2024, Turner’s works were included in Craft Front and Center at the Museum of Art and Design, NY curated by Alexandra Schwartz. "Look to the exhibition’s younger, contemporary artists as proof of craft’s continued relevance. Next to a magnificent Sheila Hicks prayer rug from 1968—on view for the first time since the 1980s after a much-needed restoration—is Vadis Turner’s Red Relic Vessel (2022), a twisted pretzel of cotton bed sheets, brick dust, and gold leaf."

"Turner sticks to traditional forms—the relief, the vessel, the grid—that prompt feelings of being tethered, whether to art history, to histories of women being yoked to the domestic, or to gender altogether. The artist’s vessels address these tethers elegantly. She became interested in vessels made from fabric, a form and a material meant to hold, but such vessels are porous, some with gaping holes—a refusal."

== Grants, awards, and residencies ==
Turner’s projects have been funded by the Joan Mitchell Foundation, Barbara Deming Memorial Fund, South Arts, Tennessee Arts Commission, and The Current Art Fund, a regranting program through the Andy Warhol Foundation.

Turner’s residencies include Corporation of Yaddo, NY (2018, 2024); Museum of Arts & Design, NY (2012); Materials for the Arts, NY (2013); Hambidge Center, GA (2020); and Vermont Studio Center, VT (2022).
