= Diya Vij =

American curator and public servant

Commissioner of the New York City Department of Cultural Affairs
- Incumbent
- Assumed office March 1, 2026
- Mayor: Zohran Mamdani
- Preceded by: Laurie Cumbo

Personal details
- Born: Trumbull, Connecticut
- Party: Democratic
- Education: Bard College (BA), Hunter College (MA)

Diya Vij is an American curator and public servant who has served as the Commissioner of the New York City Department of Cultural Affairs since 2026, when she was appointed by Zohran Mamdani. She had previously worked as a curator in various organizations, both public and private.

== Biography ==
Vij was born and raised in Trumbull, Connecticut to a family of Indian immigrants. She frequently visited New York as a child to get Indian groceries. She attended Bard College for her BA and Hunter College for her MA in Art History. After stints in Delhi and Los Angeles, she moved to New York City.

She began her career at the Queens Museum, where she worked as a curatorial fellow and then in digital communications, before following her then-boss Tom Finkelpearl to the Department of Cultural Affairs, which he headed during the mayoralty of Bill de Blasio. She worked in digital communications there, and launched and managed both the Digital Artists in Residence and the Diversity, Equity, and Inclusion programs. During this time, she was profiled by Elle for their This Is Thirty series.

She went on to serve as an associate curator at High Line and a curator at Creative Time, and became vice president of curatorial and arts programs at Powerhouse Arts on November 3, 2025. That same month, she was named to Zohran Mamdani's arts and culture transition committees.

In February 2026, she was named Commissioner of the New York City Department of Cultural Affairs, the largest municipal culture funder in the United States, by Mamdani. She is the first person of South Asian heritage to hold the role. Her selection received praise from individuals including Finkelpearl, Elizabeth Alexander, Thelma Golden, and Patrick Gaspard. One of her stated main priorities is making the city more affordable for artists, including through affordable housing. She has also discussed ending what she calls a "landscape of fear", which she believes is caused by an uneven COVID-19 recovery and political intimidation. She has stated her goal is for New Yorkers to think of arts funding as an "essential part of their infrastructure" in the same way as pothole fixing.

She has also served as a member of the board of three nonprofits, including the Poetry Project.

She was named an Observer Power Player in 2021.

== See also ==
- Indians in the New York metropolitan area
