= Laurie Cumbo =

American politician (born 1975)

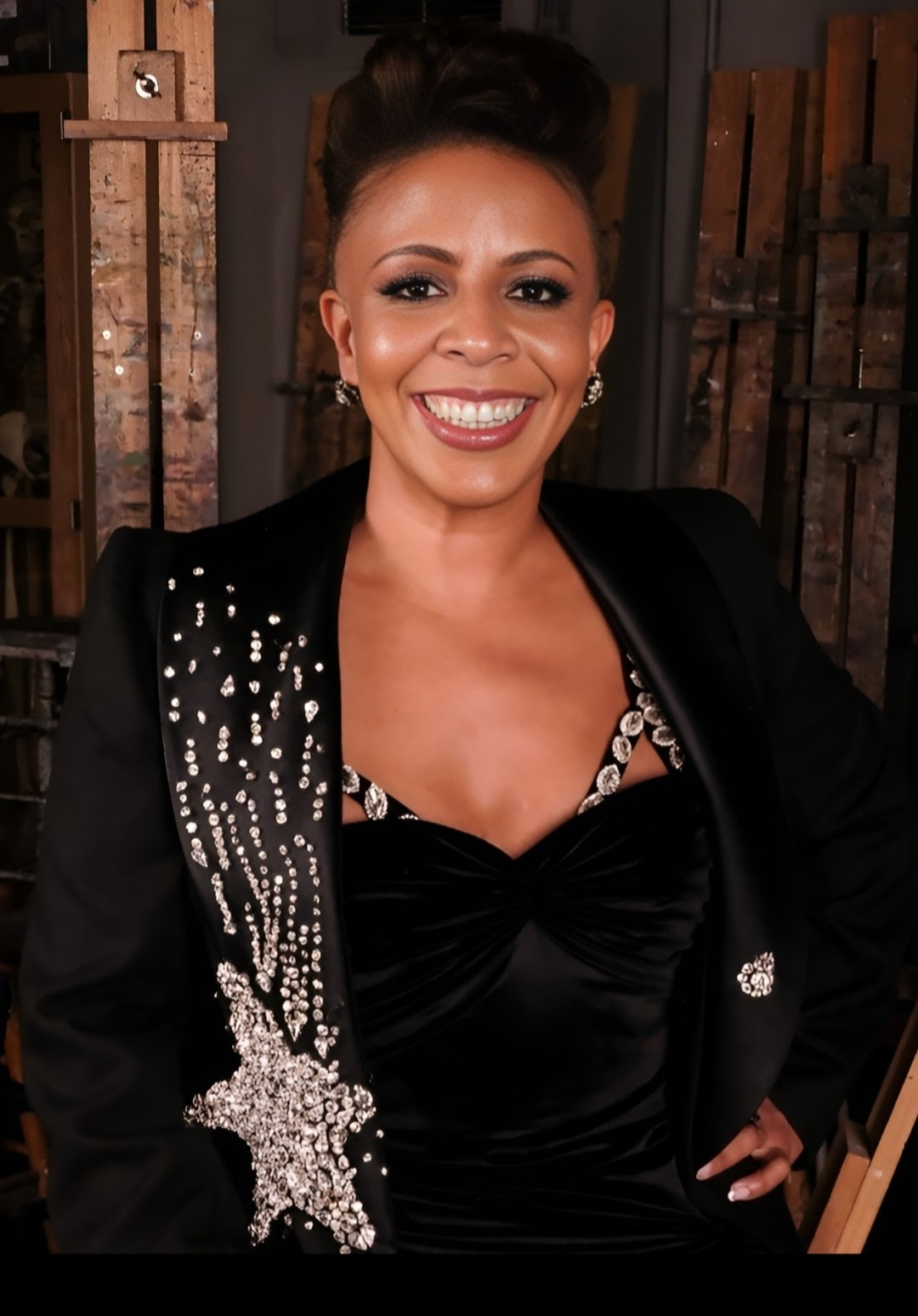

Commissioner of the New York City Department of Cultural Affairs
- In office March 18, 2022 – February 28, 2026
- Mayor: Eric Adams
- Preceded by: Gonzalo Casals
- Succeeded by: Diya Vij

Majority Leader of the New York City Council
- In office January 11, 2018 – December 31, 2021
- Speaker: Corey Johnson
- Preceded by: Jimmy Van Bramer
- Succeeded by: Keith Powers

Member of the New York City Council from the 35th District
- In office January 1, 2014 – December 31, 2021
- Preceded by: Letitia James
- Succeeded by: Crystal Hudson

Personal details
- Born: Laurie Angela Cumbo; February 21, 1975 (age 51) Brooklyn, New York, U.S.
- Party: Democratic
- Education: Spelman College (BA); New York University (MA)
- Website: Official website

Laurie A. Cumbo (born February 21, 1975) is an American politician who formerly served as Commissioner of the New York City Department of Cultural Affairs. A Democrat, she served in the New York City Council for the 35th district from 2014 to 2021, which includes the Brooklyn neighborhoods of Fort Greene, Clinton Hill, and Prospect Heights, portions of Bedford-Stuyvesant, Crown Heights, Downtown Brooklyn, the Brooklyn Navy Yard, and Vinegar Hill. She is the founder and first executive director of the Museum of Contemporary African Diaspora Arts.

Cumbo was ineligible to run in 2021 due to term limits.

== Early life and education ==
Cumbo was born in Brooklyn, New York to Wilkins and Beverly Cumbo, the latter an opera singer, and raised in East Flatbush at a time when waves of people of Jewish descent were leaving and residents of African descent were arriving. (Her father had moved to the neighborhood in the 1940s.)

Cumbo developed an interest in museums and the visual arts at an early age. At the age of fifteen, she began interning at the Metropolitan Museum of Art. She subsequently held internships at the Brooklyn Museum, the Brooklyn Children's Museum, the High Museum of Art, the Spelman College Museum of Fine Art, and the Grey Art Museum.

After graduating from Brooklyn Technical High School, she was accepted into and enrolled in Spelman College in Atlanta, Georgia in 1997, inspired by the actions of characters on The Cosby Show and A Different World. After receiving a degree in fine arts there, she received a master's degree in visual arts administration from New York University in 1999.

== Early career ==
Based on her 1999 NYU graduate work and a trip to Bilbao, Spain, Cumbo founded and served as the executive director of the Museum of Contemporary African Diaspora Arts (MoCADA). She told the New York Times's Local, "prior to [receiving her master's] I would say I was very inspired by the Guggenheim Museum in Bilbao, Spain. This museum created a whole economy for this particular city after its shipping industry died. It made Bilbao and the museum a must destination when visiting Spain. I know that MoCADA can do that for Brooklyn as well."

Originally based in a building operated by the Bridge Street AME church in the Bedford-Stuyvesant section of Brooklyn, the institution moved to its current location in the borough's gentrified Fort Greene section within the BAM Cultural District with the help of the Brooklyn Academy of Music's Local Development Corporation, which included Bruce Ratner, the Barclays Center and Atlantic Yards developer, on its board. In 2012, the museum landed a $100,000 grant from the Rockefeller Foundation to pay for a two-year program that brought monthly concerts to public spaces in nearby NYCHA Houses like Walt Whitman, Ingersoll, and Farragut in Fort Greene that drew crowds up to 500 or 600. The following year, MoCADA launched another art performance series, Soul of Brooklyn, "a borough-wide celebration of the diverse arts and cultures of Brooklyn's African Diaspora". From 2001 to 2011, Cumbo served as a graduate professor in the Arts and Cultural Management program at Pratt Institute's School of Art & Design.

== Museum of Contemporary African Diasporan Arts ==
While studying Visual Arts Administration at New York University, Cumbo developed a graduate thesis proposing a museum dedicated to contemporary art of the African diaspora. After graduating in 1999, she founded the Museum of Contemporary African Diasporan Arts (MoCADA).

Under her leadership, the institution expanded its programming and became one of the first museums in the United States devoted to contemporary art of the African diaspora. In 2025, MoCADA became an anchor institution in the L10 Arts and Cultural Center in Downtown Brooklyn, an $84 million cultural development shared with the Brooklyn Public Library, Brooklyn Academy of Music, and 651 ARTS.

== New York City Council ==
=== 2013 election ===
In 2013, she moved into the 35th Council district to run for its city council seat. By the end of August 2013, Cumbo's political campaign had received at least $80,000 from Jobs for New York PAC, a pro-development political action committee unpopular in an already rapidly gentrifying area. In an AARP-sponsored discussion a week later she claimed she received no money from the Real Estate Board of New York (backers of Jobs for New York), and that they had given no contributions to her campaign. She denied it again when confronted with the issue at a Brooklyn community board committee meeting in February 2015.

Elected in 2013 in a crowded Democratic primary race, Cumbo, unchallenged by a Republican candidate, succeeded Letitia James. She was handpicked to run by Brooklyn Congressman Hakeem Jeffries. Cumbo's political leanings are in some ways more conservative than that of her predecessor, and has been the subject of other controversies. She had previously denounced the practice and encouraged voters to blow the whistle on excessive corporate support of political campaigns during her campaign. She did not appear at the public debate before the primary election for the council district seat on August 21, 2013.

Her platform included "Investing in Economic Development, Strengthening Not-for-Profits and Service Employees, Reforming Education." She was endorsed by Jeffries, New York State Assemblyman Walter Mosley, and the Working Families Party.

Election results
Location	Year	Election	Results
NYC Council District 35	2013	Democratic Primary	√ Laurie Cumbo 36.25% Olanike T. Alabi 25.75% Ede S. Fox 25.60% Jelani Mashariki 6.43% F. Richard Hurley 5.97%
NYC Council District 35	2013	General	√ Laurie Cumbo (D) 99.71%

=== 2017 election ===
In 2017, Cumbo, now an incumbent, again defeated one of her 2013 opponents, Ede Fox, in the Democratic primary, 58% to 42%. She defeated then-Green Party candidate Jabari Brisport and Republican Christine Parker in the general election.

Election results
Location	Year	Election	Results
NYC Council District 35	2017	Democratic Primary	√ Laurie Cumbo 58% Ede S. Fox 42%
NYC Council District 35	2017	Green Primary	√ Jabari Brisport 89% Scott Hutchins 11%
NYC Council District 35	2017	General	√ Laurie Cumbo (D) Jabari Brisport (G) Christine Parker (R)

Cumbo is ineligible to run in 2021 due to term limits.

=== Tenure ===
Cumbo took office in January 2014. She was appointed chair of the Women's Issues Committee and serves on the following committees: Cultural Affairs, Libraries, and International Intergroup Relations; Finance; Higher Education; Public Housing; and Youth Services. She is a member of the Women's Caucus and the Black, Latino/a, and Asian Caucus. She is specifically passionate about women's issues such as domestic violence, workplace discrimination, girls education, and sex trafficking.

In her first six months in government, when city council members were working on the FY 2015 Budget, she and Council Member Ritchie Torres, chair of the Public Housing Committee, along with many residents advocated to stop 57 NYCHA community and senior centers from experiencing cuts in funding. As a result, the Council allocated $17 million to keep these centers open.

Early in October 2014, Cumbo, as chair of the Women's Issues Committee, and her colleague Vanessa Gibson, chair of the Public Safety Issues Committee, announced the council allocated nearly $6 million to support domestic violence programs and initiatives. On October 15, 2014, Cumbo joined by Speaker Melissa Mark-Viverito, Rosemonde Pierre-Louis, commissioner for the Mayor's Office to Combat Domestic Violence and other citywide elected officials, posted at subway stations across the city in a campaign that Cumbo organized in order to raise awareness of the problem of domestic violence in honor of "NYC Go Purple Visibility Day". She and her office partnered with the "Not on My Watch!" campaign back in June 2014.

She was also in strong support of hosting the 2016 Democratic National Convention in New York City, specifically Brooklyn, which failed. In arguing in favor of the convention coming to her borough, she argued "We have swag on lock down," continuing, "A convention anywhere else in the United States of America is just going to be 'eh.'" This earned her an ingratiating visit from Senator Chuck Schumer at her first "state of the district" address at the Brooklyn Museum.

During Jumaane Williams's campaign for New York City Public Advocate, The Daily News broke the story of his 2009 arrest in a domestic dispute, the records that had been sealed, which were used by competing candidates. Cumbo, who went to high school with Williams, wrote a letter demanding to know if the law enforcement sources of the story broke city policy in doing so.

Among the initiatives associated with her tenure were negotiations that resulted in a thirty-year agreement preserving rent stabilization for approximately 600 apartments in the former Brooklyn Jewish Hospital complex through a partnership involving the New York City Department of Housing Preservation and Development and Alma Realty. She also supported redevelopment projects including the Bedford Union Armory, improvements to entrances at Prospect Park, and investments in cultural infrastructure throughout her district.

In 2021, Cumbo voted against allowing non-citizens to vote in municipal elections because she claimed it would dilute the power of black voters at the gain of Latino voters, implying Latino residents of the city were largely non-citizens.

Cumbo made local headlines again in late March 2015 when she asked why there were "blocs" (possibly "blocks") of Asians living in two Fort Greene housing projects. Colleague and Manhattan councilwoman Margaret Chin, who is Chinese-American, said "She certainly could've chosen her words a bit more carefully. The fact is that there are many Asian-American families . . . who have applied to live in public housing." Cumbo issued an apology.

== New York City Department of Cultural Affairs ==
On March 18, 2022, Mayor Eric Adams appointed Cumbo as Commissioner of the New York City Department of Cultural Affairs.

As commissioner, she oversaw one of the largest municipal cultural agencies in the United States. During her tenure, the department expanded operating support for cultural organizations, announced the largest expansion of New York City's Cultural Institutions Group in decades, increased baseline funding for the agency, and advanced capital investments supporting museums, libraries, and performing arts organizations throughout the city. The department also continued initiatives including the City Canvas public art program and announced plans for new public monuments recognizing women in New York City's history.

She served until 2026, when her tenure concluded following the transition to the administration of Mayor Zohran Mamdani. She was succeeded by Diya Vij, who became Commissioner of the Department of Cultural Affairs in 2026.

== Legacy ==
Cumbo has been recognized for her contributions to arts administration, cultural policy, and community development in Brooklyn.

The Laurie A. Cumbo Children's Enrichment Center was named in her honor after her advocacy to preserve the educational facility during a proposed redevelopment project.

== Views and opinions ==
Throughout her career, Cumbo has argued that arts and culture are essential components of civic life rather than discretionary public expenditures. She has maintained that cultural institutions contribute to economic development, tourism, education, and community well-being, while also serving as spaces for dialogue and social engagement. As Commissioner of the New York City Department of Cultural Affairs, she advocated increased public investment in cultural organizations, particularly small and community-based institutions in underserved neighborhoods, arguing that government has a responsibility to ensure equitable access to the arts.

Cumbo has been an advocate for expanding the representation of African diaspora artists and communities within museums and cultural institutions. She founded the Museum of Contemporary African Diasporan Arts (MoCADA) in response to what she viewed as a lack of institutional support and exhibition opportunities for contemporary artists of African descent. In interviews, she has stated that the museum was intended to broaden public understanding of African diaspora cultures while fostering dialogue across racial, cultural, and socioeconomic boundaries.

Cumbo has consistently argued that cultural development should form part of broader urban policy. She has described arts programming as a means of strengthening neighborhoods, supporting education, reducing social isolation, and encouraging economic revitalization. During her tenure on the New York City Council and later as Cultural Affairs Commissioner, she supported integrating cultural investment into community development projects and promoted permanent infrastructure for nonprofit arts organizations throughout New York City.

Cumbo has advocated for a more equitable distribution of municipal resources, arguing that public funding should extend beyond major cultural institutions to include smaller organizations serving historically underrepresented communities. She has also emphasized that access to arts education and cultural programming should not depend on neighborhood wealth or private philanthropy, describing government investment as essential to sustaining New York City's cultural ecosystem.

Cumbo has defended the role of museums and artists in addressing contemporary social issues. She has argued that cultural institutions should engage with subjects such as race, inequality, policing, housing, and neighborhood change, maintaining that art can foster public discussion on issues affecting society. She has stated that museums should function as active civic institutions rather than solely as repositories for exhibitions.

Political offices
Preceded by Letitia James	New York City Council, 35th district 2014–2021	Succeeded by Crystal Hudson
Civic offices
Preceded by Gonzalo Casals	Commissioner of the New York City Department of Cultural Affairs; 2022–present	Succeeded by Incumbent
