= Tom Finkelpearl =

American curator (born 1956)

Commissioner of the New York City Department of Cultural Affairs
- In office April 7, 2014 – December 31, 2019
- Mayor: Bill De Blasio
- Preceded by: Kate Levin
- Succeeded by: Gonzalo Casals

Personal details
- Born: February 1, 1956 (age 70)
- Education: Phillips Academy; Princeton University (BA) 1979; Hunter College (MFA)

Tom Finkelpearl (born February 1, 1956) is an American arts promoter, former museum director, and former Commissioner of the New York City Department of Cultural Affairs. He was appointed in 2014 by the New York City mayor, Bill de Blasio, and served through the end of 2019.

== Early life and career ==
He graduated from Phillips Academy in Andover, Massachusetts in 1974, from Princeton University in 1979 and from Hunter College (MFA) in 1983.

Before joining city government, Finkelpearl served for 12 years as director of the Queens Museum from 2002 to 2014. While serving as director, he hired community organizers to emphasize the diversity of the immigrant population. He presided over the museum's $68 million renovation effort. He doubled the size of the Queens Museum and saw its budget grow from $2.3 million to $4.9 million. He served under mayor David Dinkins and Rudy Giuliani by running the city's Percent for Art program.

== City government ==
As commissioner, he oversaw city funding of nonprofit arts organizations, and is leading an effort to promote cultural diversity in arts programs citywide. His department is in charge of a $156 million budget. His approach to arts has been described as populist and he sees art and artists as making a valuable contribution to the overall economic health of the city. Notable employees include Diya Vij.

In July 2017, Mayor de Blasio and Commissioner Finkelpearl announced the launch of CreateNYC, a 10-year cultural plan to increase access to arts and culture programming in all five boroughs and help make New York's cultural institutions more reflective of the city’s multiethnic, multicultural population, having previously stated that "every corner of this city needs to have art." He introduced a program to offer free access to member institutions using a municipal identification card.

Finkelpearl was criticized for his disagreements with public opinion of two future public monuments in Central Park: a women's suffrage monument that will be the park's first depicting real women, as well as a statue to replace J. Marion Sims, one of the first gynecologists who also performed experimental surgeries on enslaved women.

On October 31, 2019, Finkelpearl announced his resignation as Commissioner, effective at the end of 2019.

Civic offices
| Preceded by Kate Levin | Commissioner of the New York City Department of Cultural Affairs; 2014–2019 | Succeeded by Kathleen Hughes (acting) |
