= New York City Department of Cultural Affairs =

New York City government agency

Department overview
- Formed: 1976; 50 years ago
- Preceding department: Parks, Recreation and Cultural Affairs Administration - Department of Cultural Affairs
- Jurisdiction: New York City
- Headquarters: 31 Chambers Street New York, NY 10007
- Employees: 51 (FY 2026)
- Annual budget: $300.5 million (FY 2026)
- Department executive: Diya Vij, Commissioner of Cultural Affairs
- Key document: New York City Charter
- Website: www.nyc.gov/dcla

The New York City Department of Cultural Affairs (DCLA) is the department of the government of New York City dedicated to supporting New York City's cultural life. Among its primary missions is ensuring adequate public funding for non-profit cultural organizations throughout the five boroughs. The Department represents and serves non-profit cultural organizations involved in the visual, literary and performing arts; public-oriented science and humanities institutions including zoos, botanical gardens and historic and preservation societies; and creative artists who live and work within the City's five boroughs.

The Office of Cultural Affairs (OCA), which prefigured the contemporary DCLA, was created in 1962 by Mayor Robert F. Wagner Jr. In 1976, the New York City Department of Cultural Affairs was established as a separate city agency, headed by the Commissioner of Cultural Affairs, who is appointed by the Mayor.

Its programs include Materials for the Arts, a large facility in Long Island City that distributes free reused supplies to arts organizations (in partnership with the New York City Department of Sanitation). Its regulations are compiled in Title 58 of the New York City Rules.

== Commissioners ==
	Cultural Affairs Commissioner	Years in Office	Appointed by
1	Doris Chanin Freedman	1967-1970	John Lindsay
2	H. Claude Shostal	1976–1977	Abraham Beame
3	Henry Geldzahler	1978–1982	Ed Koch
4	Randall Bourscheidt (Acting)	1982–1983	Ed Koch
5	Bess Myerson	1983–1987	Ed Koch
6	Mary Schmidt Campbell	1987–1991	Ed Koch
7	Luis R. Cancel	1991–1994	David Dinkins
8	Schuyler G. Chapin	1994–2001	Rudolph Giuliani
9	Kate Levin	2002–2013	Michael Bloomberg
10	Tom Finkelpearl	2014–2019	Bill de Blasio
11	Gonzalo Casals	2020–2022	Bill de Blasio
12	Laurie Cumbo	2022–2026	Eric Adams
13	Diya Vij	2026–present	Zohran Mamdani
