= Wunsch Building =

Academic building in Brooklyn, New York

Coordinates: 40°41′39.56″N 73°59′5.49″W

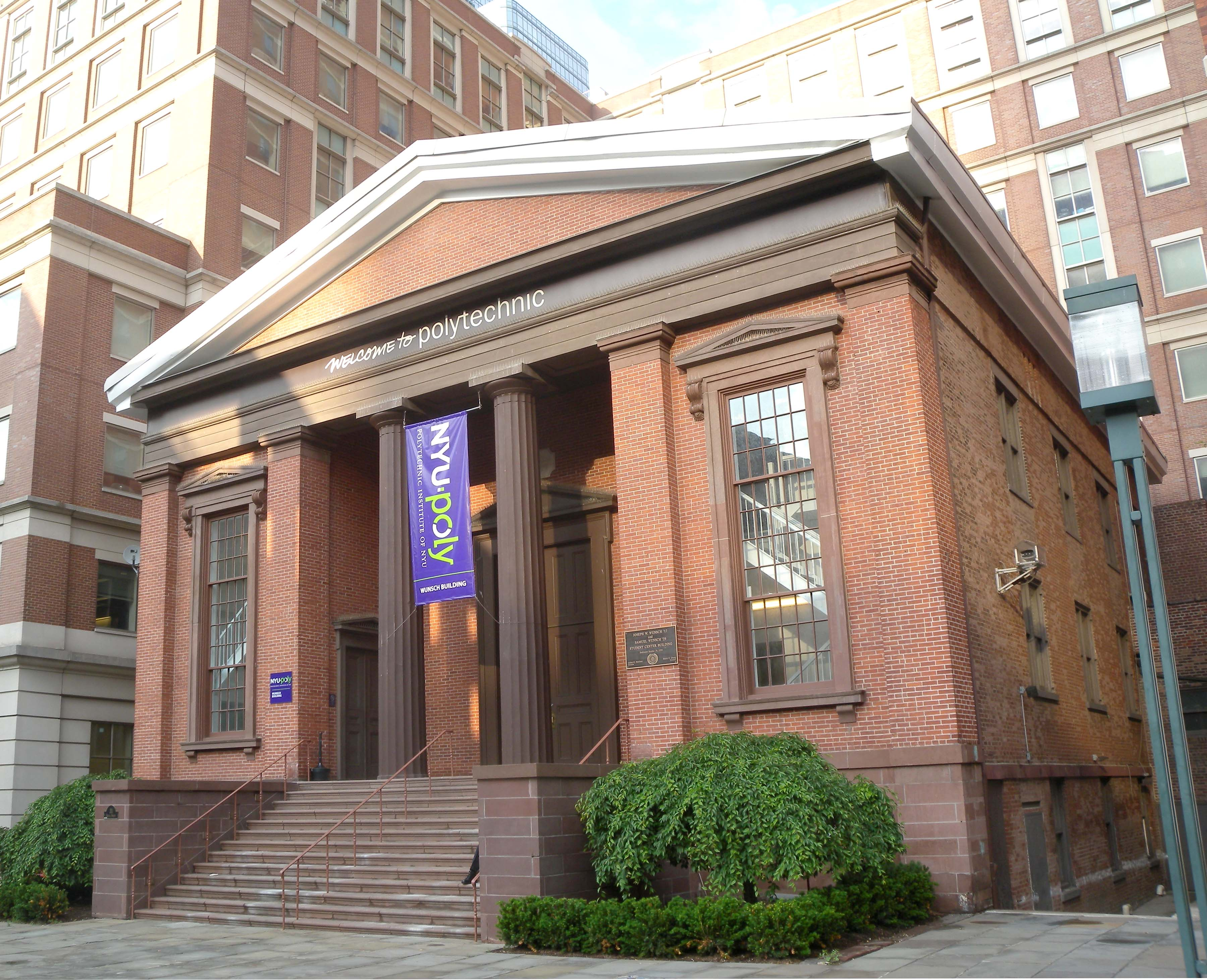
- Wunsch Building
- Interactive map of the Wunsch Building area
- Former names: Bridge Street Methodist Church; First Free Congregational Church

General information
- Architectural style: Greek Revival
- Location: Brooklyn, New York, United States
- Construction started: 1844
- Completed: 1847
- Client: Methodist Episcopal Church of the United States

Technical details
- Structural system: Masonry

The Wunsch Building of New York University Tandon School of Engineering is the present name of the former Bridge Street Methodist Church, a former Methodist church located at 311 Bridge Street, on the east side between Johnson Street and Myrtle Avenue, in Downtown Brooklyn, New York City. The Greek Revival temple was erected 1844. It is also recorded as the First Congregational Church.

The building dates to 1847 and was the first independent black church in Brooklyn. It was also a stop on the Underground Railroad and has been designated a historic landmark since November 24, 1981.

The former church was recorded in the AIA Guide to New York City (1977) as the NYU Tandon School of Engineering annex. "A Greek Revival temple in brick with wood columns and entablature: chaste, excepting the later Victorian stained glass, which is exuberant even from the outside."

The church building is now called the Wunsch Building and houses the school's Undergraduate Admissions offices. It is used to host many social, cultural, and academic events for the school and community.

== See also ==
- List of New York City Landmarks
