= Materials for the Arts =

Materials for the Arts is a program of the New York City Department of Cultural Affairs that provides free "new and gently used donated supplies to artists, nonprofit groups, and public schools". It is located in a 25,000-square-foot warehouse in Queens that has been described as "zany" and compared to Willy Wonka’s chocolate factory.

Established in 1978 by artist and New York City public school teacher Angela Fremont, Materials for the Arts repurposes leftover supplies from businesses, which receive a tax write-off for the value of items they donate to the program. Free "shopping" is open two days per week for teachers and members of registered organizations.

Considered to be one of the largest reuse centers in the country, the program processes more than 6 million pounds of donated art supplies per year, gathering "donations from fashion houses, television production companies and big-name corporations like Estée Lauder." The facility offers eclectic items including bra straps from Victoria's Secret, set pieces from The Phantom of the Opera, toaster ovens, toothbrushes, leather from airplane seats, and many other objects. It has described by The New York Times as "like a Kmart reimagined as Pee-wee's Big Adventure."

According to its website, the program also removes "hundreds of tons from the waste stream every year and [keeps it] out of landfills, which helps sustain our environment, promote reuse, and reduce waste." The executive director of Materials for the Arts is Harriet Taub.
