= Cheryl LaRoche =

American historical and archaeological consultant

Cheryl LaRoche PhD
- Occupation: Associate Research Professor
- Awards: The Society for Historical Archaeology John L. Cotter Award (2011) The Maryland Historical Trust Calvert Prize (2023)

Academic background
- Education: University of Maryland, College Park (PhD)
- Thesis: On the edge of freedom: free black communities, archaeology, and the Underground Railroad (2004)

Academic work
- Discipline: Archaeology; History
- Institutions: University of Maryland
- Website: www.drcheryllaroche.com arch.umd.edu/people/cheryl-laroche

Cheryl LaRoche is an American historical and archaeological consultant notable for her work exploring the landscapes of 18th and 19th-century free black communities and their relationships to the Underground Railroad.

== Education and career ==
Dr LaRoche holds a PhD in American Studies from the University of Maryland, College Park, with a focus in Archaeology and African American history. She is now an Associate Research Professor at the University of Maryland, College Park. In 2011 the Society for Historical Archaeology awarded LaRoche with the John L. Cotter award for her "remarkable work in expanding the interdisciplinary development of historical archaeology in examinations of African American history and culture". In 2023 was awarded the Maryland Historical Trust Calvert Prize for leadership and service in historical preservation. She has acted as a consultant for numerous institutions, including the Smithsonian's National Museum of African American History and Culture, several National Park service sites. and the African Burial Ground Project. In 2017 she gave the Wesleyan University Centre for African American Studies 21st Annual Distinguished Lecture on "The Geography of Resistance: Free black Communities and the Underground Railroad".

== Publications ==
- 2025: Apostle of Liberation: AME Bishop Paul Quinn, and the Underground Railroad, Rowman & Littlefield
- 2024: "Religion and the Underground Railroad. The Underground Railroad: Essays on the Network to Freedom" Official National Park Service Handbook. https://housedivided.dickinson.edu/sites/ugrr/
- 2022: "The Balance Principle Revisited: Slavery, Freedom and the Geography of Statehood". In Cabin, Quarter, Plantation: Architecture and Landscapes of North American Slavery. Electronic Edition, Yale University Press.
- 2021: "The Underground Railroad in Maryland's Ports Bays, and Harbors: Maritime Strategies for Freedom". In Sailing to Freedom: Maritime Dimensions of the Underground Railroad, edited by Timothy D. Walker, University of Massachusetts Press.
- 2021: "Secrets Well Kept: Colored Conventioneers and Underground Railroad Activism". In The Colored Conventions Movement: Black Organizing in the Nineteenth Century, edited by P. Gabrielle Foremen, Jim Casey and Sarah Lynn Patterson, University of North Carolina Press.
