= Irene Estrada =

American perennial candidate (born 1959)

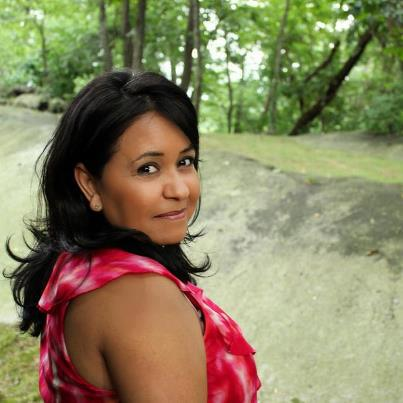
- Estrada in 2013
- Born: 1959 (age 66)
- Occupations: Activist, political candidate
- Political party: Conservative (2025–present)
- Other political affiliations: Democratic (before 2025); War Veterans (2013)

Irene Estrada (formerly Irene Estrada-Rukaj) (born 1959) is an American perennial candidate.

Although she has never been elected, Estrada has run for a number of offices, including for State Assembly and City Council multiple times as a member of the Democratic Party. Estrada ran in the 2025 New York City mayoral election as the candidate of the Conservative Party of New York State. Estrada has lived in the Bronx since 1982, and currently serves as a spiritual advisor to the New York City Police Department Policewomen's Endowment Association.

== Biography ==
From Midland, Texas, Estrada moved with her two daughters to New York City's Bronx borough in 1982. She is Mexican American. Estrada ran in the 2013 New York City Public Advocate election on the War Veterans ballot line. At the time, she sat on Bronx Community Board 11 and was a civilian advisor for the New York City Police (NYPD) Explorers. She previously ran for the State Assembly twice (including a run for the 80th district in 2012) and City Council once, and remained a member of the Democratic Party. She polled 0.5 percent of the citywide vote, losing in a landslide to Democratic candidate Letitia James. Estrada ran for City Council again in 2023, in the 13th district Democratic primary against incumbent Marjorie Velázquez.

=== 2025 New York City mayoral election ===
In 2025, she ran in the New York City mayoral election as the candidate for the Conservative Party. New York City's unique system of electoral fusion often sees the Conservative Party cross-endorse Republican Party candidates, as they did at the 2013 and 2017 mayoral elections. However, the Republican candidate in both 2021 and 2025, Curtis Sliwa, described himself as differing with the party on a number of views, including on abortion, LGBTQ rights, and gun control. Paul Briscoe, a Brooklyn resident, had been the Conservative Party's initial selection for mayor, but he rejected the nomination, giving the Conservative Party 72 hours to find a replacement. In Estrada's words, "Pat McManus, the chairman [of the Bronx County Conservative Party], called me and said, Irene, if you want this slot, it's yours. So I said, I'll pray on it. And the Lord said, Take it." Estrada was given Wilson Pakula authorization to run for the Conservative Party, as she remained a registered Democrat.

As part of her 2025 mayoral campaign, Estrada focused on issues of public safety, promising to "preserve" the NYPD and restore respect for law enforcement, stating that Democratic mayoral candidate Zohran Mamdani would "dismantle" such respect. Estrada opposed Just Housing, a planned affordable housing project for former prisoners in the Morris Park neighborhood of the Bronx. Estrada stated she would remove New York City's status as a sanctuary city for four years if elected. She has sat on the clergy council of the NYPD's 49th precinct, and currently serves as a spiritual adviser to the Policewomen's Endowment Association. Estrada is a nondenominational Christian minister. Raising $811 in her campaign, Estrada ultimately polled 0.13 percent of the vote for mayor, according to unofficial election night results.

== Personal life ==
Estrada divorced her husband in 2003. She has several children and grandchildren, 4 of whom are police officers.

== Electoral history ==
2025 New York City mayoral election
Party	Candidate	Votes	%	±%
Democratic	Zohran Mamdani	944,950	43.07%	−22.12%
Working Families	Zohran Mamdani	169,234	7.71%	N/A
Total	Zohran Mamdani	1,114,184	50.78%	N/A
Fight and Deliver	Andrew Cuomo	906,614	41.32%	N/A
Republican	Curtis Sliwa	143,305	6.53%	−20.37%
Protect Animals	Curtis Sliwa	10,444	0.48%	N/A
Total	Curtis Sliwa	153,749	7.01%	−19.89%
Safe&Affordable/EndAntiSemitism	Eric Adams (incumbent) (withdrawn)	6,897	0.31%	N/A
Conservative	Irene Estrada	2,856	0.13%	−0.99%
Integrity	Jim Walden (withdrawn)	2,319	0.11%	N/A
Quality of Life	Joseph Hernandez	1,379	0.06%	N/A
Write-in		6,206	0.28%	−0.34%
Total votes		2,194,204	100%	
Democratic hold				

2023 New York's 13th District City Council Democratic primary
Party	Candidate	Votes	%
Democratic	Marjorie Velázquez (incumbent)	2,780	65.4
Democratic	Bernadette Ferrara	820	19.3
Democratic	Irene Estrada	313	7.4
Democratic	John Perez	238	5.6
Write-in		102	2.4
Total votes		4,253	100.0

2013 New York City Public Advocate General Election
Party	Candidate	Votes	%
Democratic	Letitia James	761,058	77.87%
Working Families	Letitia James	53,821	5.51%
Total	Letitia James	814,879	83.37%
Conservative	Robert Maresca	119,768	12.25%
Green	James Lane	16,974	1.74%
Libertarian	Alex Merced	10,419	1.07%
Socialist Workers	Deborah O. Liatos	5,114	0.52%
War Veterans	Irene Estrada	4,216	0.43%
Students First	Mollina G. Fabricant	2,391	0.24%
Freedom Party of New York	Michael K. Lloyd	1,799	0.18%
Total votes		975,560	100%

2012 New York District 80 State Assembly election
Party	Candidate	Votes	%
Democratic	Mark Gjonaj	2,559	50.9
Democratic	Naomi Rivera (incumbent)	2,033	40.5
Democratic	Adam Bermudez	265	5.3
Democratic	Irene Rukaj	157	3.1
Write-in		11	0.2
Total votes		5,025	100.0
