= Kristy Marmorato =

American politician (born 1978)

Member of the New York City Council for the 13th district
- In office January 1, 2024 – December 31, 2025
- Preceded by: Marjorie Velázquez
- Succeeded by: Shirley Aldebol

Personal details
- Born: August 18, 1978 (age 47) New York City, New York, U.S.
- Party: Republican
- Spouse: Gino Marmorato
- Education: Hostos Community College (attended)
- Website: Campaign website Official website

Kristy Marmorato (née Rendino; born August 18, 1978) is an American healthcare professional and politician who served on the New York City Council representing the 13th district from 2024 to 2025. She was the first Republican elected to the city council from the Bronx in over 40 years. In 2025, Marmorato was defeated in her bid for re-election by Democratic nominee Shirley Aldebol, a local labor organizer.

== Early life ==
Marmorato was born, raised, and educated in The Bronx. She grew up in Throggs Neck and as an adult lived in both Pelham Bay and Country Club. She currently resides in Morris Park.

== Career ==
Prior to her 2023 campaign for the New York City Council, Marmorato was an x-ray technician employed by Greenwich Hospital for 24 years, 16 of which were in the East Bronx.

According to Marmorato, her political involvement began in response to community opposition to the Just Home housing project. On August 19, 2022, NYC Health + Hospitals and the Department of Housing Preservation and Development announced Just Home, a proposal to provide housing for formerly incarcerated New Yorkers with complex and critical medical conditions. The project was planned for 1900 Seminole Avenue, a vacant building on the Jacobi Medical Center campus.

Members of Community Board 11 vehemently opposed the initiative, including Marmorato. She later stated that the controversy over Just Home prompted her to become more active in the Morris Park community during the summer of 2022. That fall, she reiterated her opposition, arguing that the site should instead be used to house domestic violence survivors and military veterans.

During the winter of 2022–2023, Marmorato announced her candidacy for New York City’s 13th City Council District, seeking the Bronx Republican Party’s endorsement in a crowded primary field ahead of the June 2023 election. Her campaign emphasized quality-of-life concerns, crime, and opposition to upzoning. She specifically criticized the proposed development of 349 housing units in Throggs Neck—168 of which were designated as affordable housing—and accused Democratic incumbent Marjorie Velázquez of reversing her position on the project.

Marmorato’s candidacy also drew criticism. George Havranek, a local organizer and one of her opponents in the Republican primary, alleged that her endorsement by the Bronx Republican Party was the product of cronyism, citing her husband, who serves as Republican commissioner on the New York City Board of Elections, Gino Marmorato, and her brother, Michael Rendino, who chairs the party. Havranek further claimed that Rendino’s position on the Board created pressure on employees to contribute to her campaign.

In addition, both the Marmorato and Havranek campaigns initially retained Nancy Marks as treasurer in January 2023. Later that month, Marks was indicted by U.S. Attorney Breon Peace in the Eastern District of New York on federal campaign finance fraud charges related to her role as treasurer for Congressman George Santos. According to the New York City Campaign Finance Board, both campaigns severed ties with Marks in early February. Marks later pleaded guilty to conspiracy, was convicted, and on March 28, 2025, was sentenced to three years’ probation.

On July 5, 2023, Marmorato secured the nomination, narrowly defeating Havranek by 55 votes and would face Velázquez on the November 7 general election.

After securing the nomination, it was reported Marmorato received endorsements for her general election campaign from former Assembly candidate Gene DeFrancis and congressional candidate Tina Forte, both of whom were present at the January 6 Capitol attack, and from former Trump administration official Kash Patel, whose statement of support appeared on her campaign’s Facebook page.

In a televised debate with Velázquez on BronxNet, Marmarato was asked if she accepted the results of the 2020 presidential election, she did not answer.

On November 7, 2023, Marmorato defeated Velázquez in the general election and for the first time in 40 years, a Republican was elected in the Bronx since Joseph Savino Jr.’s term ended in 1983. Marmorato’s victory was interpreted as a bellwether for the upcoming 2024 state election.

== New York City Council ==
After campaigning against upzoning in 2023, Marmorato opposed rezoning proposals in the East Bronx for transit-oriented development associated with the MTA’s Penn Station Access project, which was scheduled to open four new Metro-North stations in 2028. The project is expected to reduce commute times between the East Bronx and Manhattan to approximately 50 minutes. One of the proposed stations, Morris Park station, would serve 16,000 people within the 13th District. The next proposed station toward Manhattan, Parkchester/Van Nest, would serve 67,000 people in both the 13th and 18th Districts. The original rezoning plan called for 7,000 housing units near the Parkchester and Morris Park neighborhoods, a quarter of which was designated as affordable housing.

Marmorato advocated for the inclusion of parking minimums in the proposal, stating that cars remain a necessity in the area and she also supported height restrictions to maintain neighborhood character. According to the NYU Furman Center Real Estate and Urban Policy, parking minimums actually contribute to the increased cost of construction and housing, which limits supply.

As a result of negotiations, two areas in eastern Morris Park were removed from rezoning, maximum building heights along Bronxdale Avenue were reduced, and East Tremont was rezoned to allow for taller development. These modifications reduced the number of planned housing units from 7,000 to 5,500. Marmorato also secured $500 million in capital funding for schools, parks, and sewage infrastructure, as well as funding for sidewalk and water line repairs and flood mitigation measures. On August 15, 2024, the City Council voted in favor to approve the rezoning plan.

On October 21, 2024, Marmorato advocated voters reject Proposition 1, which will have expanded the State Constitution's anti-discrimination protections on ethnicity, national origin, age, disability, and sex—including sexual orientation, gender identity, gender expression, pregnancy, pregnancy outcomes, and reproductive healthcare and autonomy—adding to the existing protections for race, color, creed, and religion. Proposition 1 was approved by voters on November 4, 2024 and took effect on January 1, 2025.

Concurrently, Marmorato opposed an initiative known as the "City of Yes" to address the city's housing crisis by up-zoning low density neighborhoods to promote affordable housing development. On December 5, 2024, the Council voted in favor of the City of Yes with Marmorato voting against.

On December 12, Marmorato and fellow members of the Common Sense Caucus petitioned for a judicial inquiry into New York City’s handling of COVID-19 lockdowns and mandates, alleging that former Mayor Bill de Blasio, ex-police commissioners, and others violated constitutional rights through unnecessary lockdowns, discriminatory policies, and collusion with unions. The City motioned to dismiss, arguing the claims were policy matters, already litigated, or beyond its authority. On July 2, 2025, Justice Chereé A. Buggs of Queens Supreme Court granted the motion, finding the vaccine mandate had expired and the allegations raised legal and policy questions unsuitable for inquiry, and dismissed the petition in full. The matter is currently on appeal to the Appellate Division, Second Department as of August 2025.

Marmorato and fellow Republican Vicky Paladino voted to elect their colleague Joann Ariola from Queens County as their new leader of the Republican caucus in The New York City Council in February 2025.

On March 25, 2025, Marmorato, other elected officials, and community groups litigated against Mayor Eric Adams and the City’s Planning Commission in Richmond County. In their lawsuit, the petitioners claimed the City of Yes was illegally implemented by rushing the required environmental review process from the State Environmental Quality Review Act. Additionally, the petition claimed Marmorato's low-density district would be "eviscerated" and when Marmorato's office was requested for comment by the BronxTimes, there was no response.

On January 3 2023, the New York State Gaming Facility Location Board began soliciting bids for three downstate casino licenses, scheduled for award in December 2025. The Bally’s Corporation submitted a proposal for a 500-room hotel, a 500,000-square-foot casino, and restaurants adjacent to its golf course. If given a license, the Trump Organization will stand to make $115 million after selling the operating lease for the Trump Golf Links to Bally's in 2023 for $60 million. However, under a separate and contingent deal, Bally's could pay an additional $115 million to the Trump Organization if they are awarded a casino license for the site.

Concurrently, on February 13, Marmorato and members of the Common Sense Caucus held a meeting with border czar Thomas Homan.

On March 21, 2024, Community Board 10 held a public hearing on the proposal, where residents voiced opposition, citing concerns about crime, gentrification, and quality of life in Throggs Neck. Bally’s chairman Soo Kim later announced a $625 million community benefits package, including infrastructure and park improvements, NYPD substations, and $10 million annually for schools, youth sports, and substance abuse programs. The company also pledged at least 1% of net gaming revenue or 3% of net profits to local causes, and offered Bronx residents equity stakes starting at $250, with a projected 9% community ownership share. In addition, Kim purchased Preston High School for $8.5 million to save it from closure, which garnered support from local parents, teachers, and residents.

On March 20, 2025, Community Board 10 held a hearing on Bally's bid, but was again opposed by attendees. It was later reported on April 10, that Marmorato may had a conflict of interest regarding the casino as her husband worked for Sands Casino as a community engagement consultant for 16 months. Sands Casino is one of Bally’s competitor for one of the licenses which seeks to build their casino in Long Island at the Nassau Coliseum. According to the report, it’s the responsibility of every council member to report any conflict.

On June 11, the City Council approved legislation sponsored by local State Senator Nathalia Fernandez to permit construction of the casino on state-owned parkland. Marmorato voted against the Council bill, calling the process “disgraceful.” Governor Kathy Hochul signed it into law on June 18. However, on July 16, Marmorato introduced a motion to reject Bally’s rezoning application, which the Council approved in an informal process known as “member deference” to provide a de facto veto power to Marmorato to decide the fate of the land use bill. However, the decision was vetoed by Mayor Eric Adams on July 30, the first time he used his veto power of a land use project. On August 14, 2025, City & State New York reported that Council Speaker Adrienne Adams said the Council lacked “the appetite” to override the veto. As of November 8, 2025, Bally's and two other candidates for the three licenses are awaiting approval from the State.

Concurrently, on June 24, Marmorato secured the Republican nomination following the 2025 primary election after running unopposed--if reelected, she would serve a four-year term. However, local news media commentated the election was competitive as she would face Shirley Aldebol after she secured the Democratic nomination after receiving significant endorsements by local unions.

On July 18, Marmorato and members of the Minority Delegation met and endorsed Curtis Silwa's candidacy for the mayoral election.

On September 25, the Just Home application was brought before the Council which was vehemently opposed by Marmorato and First Deputy Mayor Randy M. Mastro. Marmorato urged her colleagues to utilize the member deference power to defeat the project after Mastro claimed the project lost support from Mayor Adams. However, Speaker Adams claimed this was an attempt to usurp the Council’s legislative power and the Council approved the application.

During a televised debate with Shirley Aldebol and third-party candidate Joel Rivera on BronxNet on October 27, Marmorato advocated for a 'full investigation" into Medicaid, claiming "a lot of people are using Medicaid to go to a hospital because they have a cough or a cold" in light of the State projecting $3 billion in cuts to the Medicaid program following passage of the Big Beautiful Bill Act. Additionally, when asked if the National Guard and federal agents should be deployed to New York City and the district, Marmorato replied in the affirmative provided then Democratic nominee Zohran Mamdani won the mayoral election.

On November 4, Marmorato lost her reelection bid to Democratic nominee Shirley Aldebol during the 2025 general election, ending Marmorato’s brief two-year tenure as Council member which expired on January 1, 2026.

== Personal life ==
Kristy Marmorato is married to Gino Marmorato, the Republican Commissioner for the City's Board of Elections, they have one daughter. Marmorato is the sister of Michael Rendino, Chairman of the Bronx Republican Party as of 2025.

== Electoral history ==
2025 New York City Council election, 13th district
Party	Candidate	Votes	%
Democratic	Shirley Aldebol	16,037	46.1
Working Families	Shirley Aldebol	2,011	5.8
Total	Shirley Aldebol	18,048	51.9
Republican	Kristy Marmorato	14,242	41.0
Conservative	Kristy Marmorato	1,703	4.9
Total	Kristy Marmorato (incumbent)	15,945	45.9
The Unity	Joel Rivera	716	2.1
Write-in		41	0.1
Total votes		34,750	100.0
Democratic gain from Republican			
