= Reshma Saujani =

American politician, lawyer, and activist

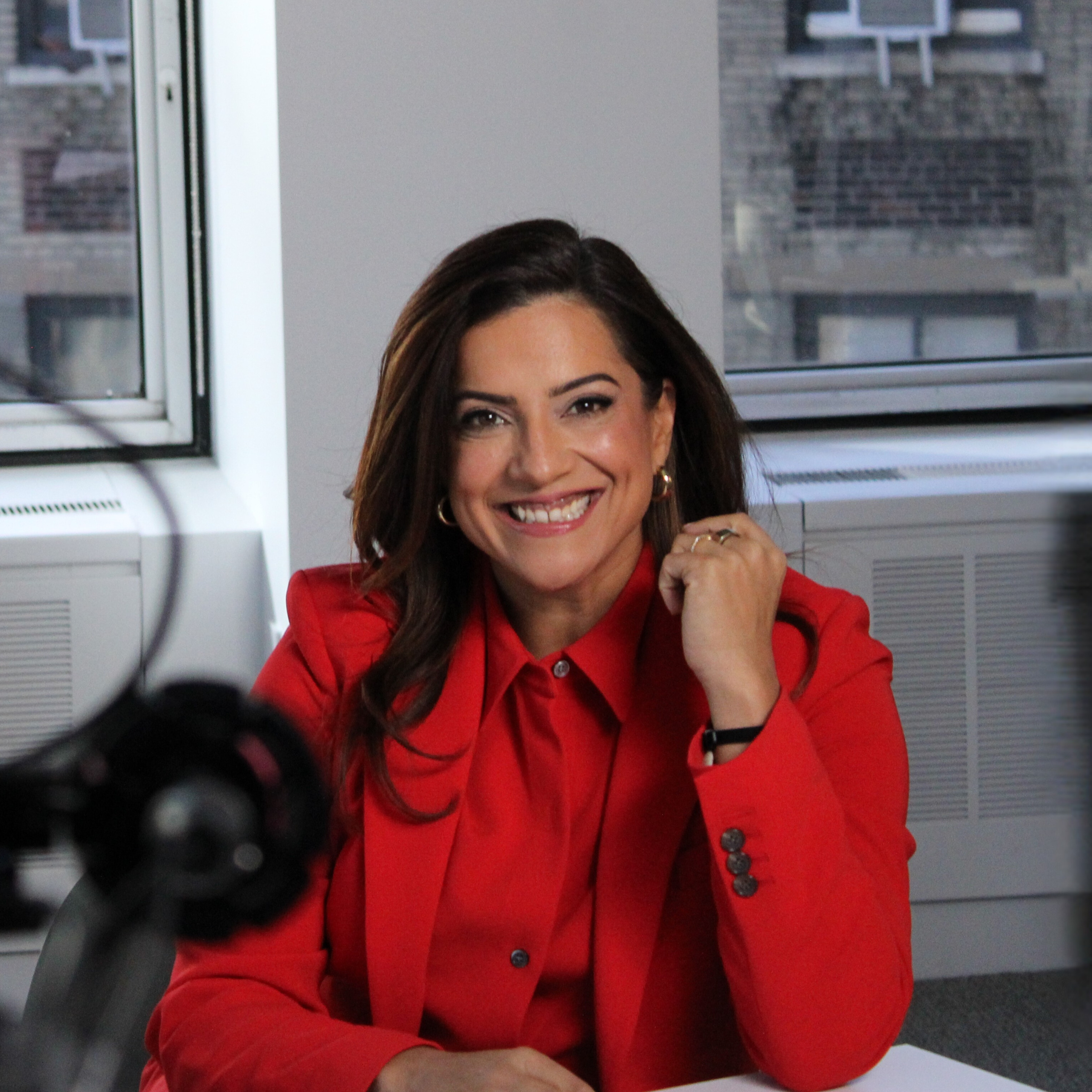
- Saujani in 2026
- Born: November 18, 1975 (age 50); Chicago, Illinois, U.S.
- Education: University of Illinois at Urbana-Champaign (BS); Harvard University (MPP); Yale University (JD)
- Occupations: lawyer, politician, nonprofit executive
- Known for: Founder of Girls Who Code and Moms First
- Spouse: Nihal Mehta
- Children: 2

Reshma Saujani is an American lawyer, activist, and entrepreneur known for founding Girls Who Code, a nonprofit organization focused on closing the gender disparity in computing, and Moms First, a nonprofit organization that advocates for policy changes to support mothers.

Saujani was born in Chicago, Illinois, to Indian immigrant parents who had left Uganda due to political unrest. She studied at the University of Illinois at Urbana-Champaign before earning a master's degree from the Harvard Kennedy School and later a Juris Doctor degree from Yale Law School. Early in her career, she worked in law, public service, and finance.

She worked in city government as a deputy public advocate at the New York City Public Advocate's office. In 2009, Saujani ran against Carolyn Maloney for the U.S. House of Representatives seat from New York's 14th congressional district, becoming the first Indian American woman to run for Congress. In 2013, she ran as a Democratic candidate for Public Advocate, coming third in the primary.

Saujani founded Girls Who Code in 2012, and was listed in Fortune’s 40 Under 40 list in 2015. She was named one of Time's 2026 Women of the Year.

== Early life and education ==
Saujani was born in Chicago. She is of Gujarati Indian descent. Saujani's parents lived in Uganda, prior to being expelled along with other persons of Indian descent in the early 1970s by Idi Amin. They settled in Chicago.

Saujani attended the University of Illinois at Urbana-Champaign, where she graduated in 1997 with majors in Political Science and Speech Communication. She attended the John F. Kennedy School of Government at Harvard University, where she received a Master of Public Policy in 1999, and Yale Law School, where she received her Juris Doctor in 2002.

== Career ==
=== Finance industry ===
Saujani worked at the law firm Davis Polk & Wardwell LLP, where she defended securities fraud cases, and on a pro bono basis handled asylum cases. In 2005, she joined the investment firm Carret Asset Management. Subsequently, she joined Blue Wave Partners Management, a subsidiary of the Carlyle Group, the global alternative asset management firm specializing in private equity. She was an associate general counsel at Blue Wave, an equity multi-strategy hedge fund; it was closed in the aftermath of the 2008 market collapse. Immediately prior to running for Congress, Saujani was a deputy general counsel at Fortress Investment Group.

=== Politics ===
Saujani was on the National Finance Board for Hillary Clinton during Clinton's campaign for president in 2008. Following the primaries, she was named vice-chair of the New York delegation at the 2008 Democratic National Convention in Denver.

In September 2011, she was named one of City & State's "40 under 40" for being a young influential member of New York City politics.

==== 2010 House election ====
Saujani in 2012

Saujani challenged incumbent Democratic Representative Carolyn Maloney for the New York's 14th congressional district in the 2010 House elections. She was the first Indian American woman to run for congress. Saujani's previous work for and link to Wall Street firms was seen as a liability to her credibility and acceptance by Democratic primary voters. Saujani won the support of Jack Dorsey, co-founder and chairman of Twitter; Randi Zuckerberg, director of market development for Facebook and sister of Facebook co-founder Mark Zuckerberg; Alexis Maybank, co-founder of Gilt Groupe; and Chris Hughes, co-founder of Facebook. Saujani outraised Maloney by almost a 2-to-1 margin in the last quarter of 2009, when Maloney had ceased fundraising following the death of her husband, Clifton Maloney, who in September had died unexpectedly on a mountain-climbing expedition in the Himalayas. Saujani's candidacy received the backing of prominent Upper East Side political fundraisers, including Cathy Lasry, Maureen White, and White's husband, financier Steven Rattner.

A poll commissioned in the spring of 2010 by the Maloney campaign showed Saujani trailing Maloney by more than 68 points. The same poll found Maloney to hold a favorable rating of 86%. Saujani's campaign mailed a flyer to voters implicating Maloney as one of eight House members investigated for taking donations from special interests. Maloney won the primary by receiving 81% of the vote to Saujani's 19%, winning the Manhattan, Queens, and Roosevelt Island portions of the district across the board by decisive margins. Saujani received 6,231 votes, despite her campaign's expenditure of $1.3 million, spending more than $213 for every vote she received.

Saujani's campaign was the first political campaign to use technology tools such as Square, Inc.

==== 2013 Public Advocate election ====
Saujani ran for the role of New York Public Advocate in 2013, coming third in the Democratic primary. Her campaign manager in 2013 was Michael Blake, who later served as a New York State Assemblyman, and then ran for the Public Advocate seat himself in 2018.

In January 2013, Saujani's Wikipedia page was heavily edited to remove traces of Saujani working for Wall Street firms such as hedge funds. Her campaign admitted to this, arguing they did it because they disagreed with the stated facts.

=== Girls Who Code ===
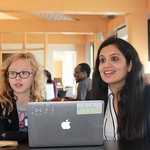
Photo from Girls Who Code Launch Day

In 2012, Saujani founded Girls Who Code, a nonprofit organization focused on reducing the gender gap in technology by promoting opportunities for women in STEM, especially by encouraging young girls to explore computer science from an early age. Saujani became aware of the extent of gender gap while visiting schools during her 2010 campaign for the U.S. Congress. While visiting schools, she noticed that computer science classrooms were overwhelmingly male. Despite the rapid growth of the technology industry, women have remained underrepresented in fields like software engineering and coding.

Saujani has advocated for a teaching approach that encourages girls to embrace risk and prioritize learning over perfection, arguing that confidence and experimentation is conducive to leadership and entrepreneurship. In her 2018 book Brave, Not Perfect, Saujani noted that girls are socialized to avoid failure, which discourages them from pursuing challenging fields like computer science.

In 2015, she collected a salary of $224,913 from the organization, according to Internal Revenue Service filings. In 2015, Reshma Saujani was named to Fortune Magazine's 40 Under 40 list. Saujani was a speaker at the 2016 TED Conference, with her talk focusing on encouraging young girls to take risks and learn to program.

As of 2026, the company has worked with over 860,000 students, providing opportunities like summer programs, clubs, and partnerships with schools and companies. During the COVID-19 pandemic, the organization maintained virtual summer programs.

=== Moms First ===
Saujani is the founder and CEO of Moms First, a non-profit organization established to address economic inequalities and social disparities that affect mothers in the United States. The initiative was founded in 2021 as the "Marshall Plan for Moms" before being renamed Moms First. In January 2021, she placed advertisements in The New York Times and The Washington Post calling on the Biden administration to support the passage of a "Marshall Plan for Moms" in the form of a resolution introduced by Representative Grace Meng and pass a series of financial relief executive actions benefiting mothers and women in the workforce.

In October 2022, the New York City Council passed a legislative package to create the Marshall Plan for Moms taskforce. The taskforce was based on Saujani's Marshall Plan for Moms initiative, and was established to direct investment in the economic empowerment of mothers.

At a campaign event at the Economic Club of New York in November 2024, Saujani asked then-presidential candidate Donald Trump if he would prioritize child care if elected. Trump’s response, that "child care is child care" and that tariff revenue would fund it, went viral.

In January 2026, Saujani stood with New York City Mayor Zohran Mamdani and Governor Kathy Hochul when they announced the launch of a free childcare program for toddlers in New York City.

She is executive producer of No Country for Mothers, a documentary about the experience of motherhood in the United States, which was released in June 2026. The film was produced by Culture House Media, Tan France's French Tuck Media, and Bobbie.

=== Podcasting ===
In 2024, Saujani became host of the podcast My So-Called Midlife. On the show, she interviewed women from various backgrounds about their experience of middle age, including astronaut Christina Koch, Supreme Court Justice Ketanji Brown Jackson, Gloria Steinem, and Margaret Cho. The show was named one of Time's Best Podcasts of the Year.

=== Other activities ===
She was elected to a six-year term on the Harvard Board of Overseers, in 2019.

== Books ==
Saujani is the author of Women Who Don't Wait in Line: Break the Mold, Lead the Way, published by Houghton Mifflin Harcourt in 2013, and Girls Who Code: Learn to Code and Change the World, published by Viking in August 2017, and Brave, Not Perfect: Fear Less, Fail More, and Live Bolder in 2018.

She is the author of the book Pay Up: The Future of Women and Work (and Why It’s Different Than You Think) published in March 2022.

== Personal life ==
Saujani is married to entrepreneur Nihal Mehta, who was a co-founder of ad tech startup LocalResponse and now is a co-founding partner of Eniac Ventures, a seed stage venture capital firm. Saujani is a practicing Hindu. They have two children.

== Electoral history ==
2010 United States House of Representatives election in New York's 14th congressional district
| Party | Candidate | Votes | % |
|---|---|---|---|
| Democratic | Carolyn Maloney | 26,303 | 80.85 |
| Democratic | Reshma Saujani | 6,231 | 19.15 |
| Total votes | | 32,534 | 100.00 |

2013 New York City Public Advocate election Democratic primary results
| Party | Candidate | Votes | % |
|---|---|---|---|
| Democratic | Letitia James | 191,347 | 36.10 |
| Democratic | Daniel Squadron | 178,151 | 33.61 |
| Democratic | Reshma Saujani | 76,983 | 14.52 |
| Democratic | Cathy Guerriero | 69,025 | 13.02 |
| Democratic | Sidique Wai | 14,409 | 2.72 |
| Democratic | Write-in | 174 | 0.03 |
| Total votes | | 530,089 | 100.00 |

== See also ==
- Gujarati Americans
- Indians in the New York City metropolitan area
