= Philip Foglia =

American lawyer (1950–2020)

Philip F. Foglia (November 27, 1950 – April 21, 2020) was an American lawyer, prosecutor, civic activist, politician, and advocate for Italian-American rights issues. Most recently, Foglia led a campaign to construct a statue honoring Frances Xavier Cabrini, an Italian-American Catholic nun more commonly known as Mother Cabrini, after the proposal was initially rejected by a New York City commission.

== Biography ==
Foglia, the son of a police detective, was raised in Belmont, a neighborhood of The Bronx with a large Italian American and Italian immigrant community. His childhood friends included actor Chazz Palminteri. He graduated from Mount Saint Michael Academy in the Bronx. Foglia received his bachelor's degree from Lehman College before completing his Juris Doctor from Pace University School of Law.

=== Prosecution career ===
Foglia was hired out of law school as a prosecutor for the office of the Bronx County District Attorney, where he prosecuted public corruption cases. In addition to his work in the Bronx, Foglia was cross-designated as an Assistant United States Attorney for the Southern District of New York during the 1980s when the office was headed by Rudy Giuliani. The Southern District office assigned Foglia to its organized crime and public corruption strike force.

In 1988, Phil Foglia was appointed as an Executive Assistant District Attorney for Investigations in Queens County, New York. He also served as a special counsel to the city of Yonkers, New York, for ten years.

In the private sector, he was a partner at the Culleton, Marinaccio and Foglia law firm in White Plains, for seventeen years.

In recent years, Foglia became a leading member of the New York State Inspector General's Office until the summer of 2019. During his tenure, Foglia uncovered a bidding scandal at the first company to run the Aqueduct Racetrack's casino, which opened in 2011. The casino's initial bids were redone following Foglia's report.

Foglia attempted to move from the prosecutor's office into elected politics. In 2005, Foglia ran as a member of the Republican, Conservative and Independence parties for the New York City Council's open 13th Council District seat, which was being vacated by outgoing councilwoman Madeline Provenzano, who was term-limited. Foglia was defeated by James Vacca, a Democrat, in the general election.

=== Italian American activism ===
Philip Foglia became a major Italian American civic and community leader in the Bronx and New York City. He established the Italian-American Legal Defense and Higher Education Fund and served as its chief legal counsel. He was also a founding member of the board of the Italian American Museum in Manhattan.

Foglia campaigned against negative Italian American stereotypes and discrimination. He also sought to elevate and protect the image of major Italian historical figures, ranging from Mother Cabrini to Christopher Columbus.

During the 1990s, Foglia filed a federal lawsuit against City University of New York (CUNY), alleging that the university routinely discriminated against Italian Americans in its hiring practices. Foglia reached a legal settlement with CUNY, which required the university to officially recognize Italian Americans as an under represented demographic group in its staff hiring decisions.

In 2017, in the aftermath of a violent march by white supremacists in Charlottesville, Virginia, New York City Mayor Bill de Blasio created a public design commission, called the Mayoral Advisory Commission on City Art, Monuments, and Markers, to review "all symbols of hate on city property.". Following Charlottesville, activist groups began calling for the removal of monuments to Christopher Columbus in New York City, including the Columbus statue at the center of Columbus Circle. Foglia and other Italian American activists defended the statues and lobbied the mayor to preserve the monuments, calling them a symbol of Italian American heritage. The commission and Mayor de Blasio ultimately decided to keep the Columbus statues.

Two years later, Foglia emerged as a leading critic over the exclusion of a proposed statue of Mother Cabrini, born Frances Xavier Cabrini, by the "She Built NYC" program, which was created to honor famous New York City women with new statues and monuments. Mother Cabrini, an Italian-born nun known for opening schools and hospitals in New York, is the patron saint of immigrants. Cabrini received the most votes for a monument in a 2018 public survey conducted by the "She Built NYC" program, out of 320 historical women who were nominated for a proposed statue. However, despite the support, the mayor's office and the "She Built NYC" commission, led by New York City First Lady Chirlane McCray, rejected the statue's inclusion in 2020 in favor of monuments to seven other women. Italian American and Catholic leaders swiftly denounced the exclusion of Cabrini's statue and criticized both McCray and Mayor de Blasio. Foglia, as head of the Italian-American Legal Defense and Higher Education Fund, called the decision an "insult" to Italian Americans and sent a letter of protest to First Lady McCray in September 2020. Foglia wrote, "Our organization is dismayed by the decision by 'She Built NYC' to preempt their own selection process and ignore Mother Cabrini, the clear choice of the public and most deserving person for such an honor." A march in support of the Mother Cabrini statue, held in Carroll Gardens, Brooklyn, on October 6, 2019, attracted more than 1,000 participants.

After months of controversy, New York Governor Andrew Cuomo stepped to override McCrae's and de Blasio's decision. On October 24, 2019, Governor Cuomo announce that a public statue honoring Mother Cabrini would indeed be constructed in New York City, writing in release, "Mother Cabrini was a great New Yorker and a great Italian American immigrant who did untold good for the people of this state, and there is no doubt she is deserving of a statue in her honor." Cuomo pledged $750 thousand to build the statue. He also appointed Philip Foglia to an 19-member commission created to oversee the Cabrini memorial. In addition to Foglia, the commission members included Brooklyn Bishop Nicholas DiMarzio and television journalist Maria Bartiromo.

In December 2019, Governor Andrew Cuomo and the 19-member commission, including Foglia, announced that the statue honoring Mother Cabrini would be constructed in Battery Park in lower Manhattan. When completed, Cabrini's monument will be located adjacent to the Museum of Jewish Heritage alongside Battery Park's South Cove, overlooking the Statue of Liberty. The panel also considered an alternative site in Brooklyn Bridge Park, but ultimately chose the location in Battery Park.

Foglia, a resident of the Pelham Gardens neighborhood of the Bronx, became ill with COVID-19 during the COVID-19 pandemic in New York City on March 22, 2020. He spent 28 days on a ventilator at Columbia Presbyterian Hospital. After five weeks, his condition eventually improved enough that he was able to be taken off the ventilator, but his health rapidly declined soon afterward and he never recovered. Foglia died from COVID-19 on April 21, 2020, at Columbia Presbyterian Hospital in Washington Heights, Manhattan, at the age of 69. He was survived by his wife of more than thirty years, Jacqueline, and their two sons, Philip Jr. and Louis.
