= Martin O'Connor =

Martin O'Connor may refer to:

- Martin O'Connor (footballer) (born 1967), English former football and manager
- Martin John O'Connor (1900–1986), American prelate of the Roman Catholic Church
- Máirtín O'Connor, Irish button accordionist

== See also ==
- Martin Connor, former member of the New York State Senate
