= James Vacca =

American politician

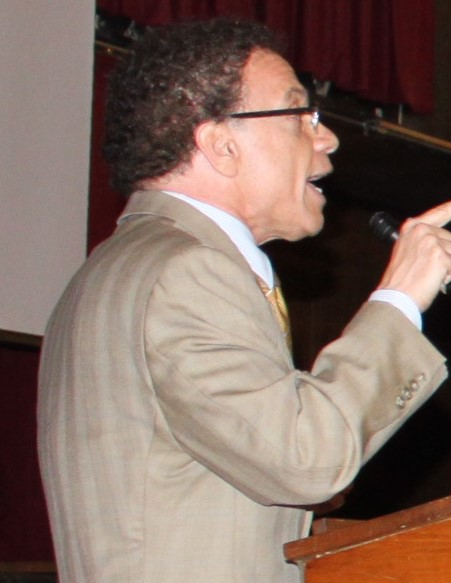

Member of the New York City Council from the 13th district
- In office January 1, 2006 – December 31, 2017
- Preceded by: Madeline Provenzano
- Succeeded by: Mark Gjonaj

Personal details
- Born: New York City, U.S.
- Party: Democratic
- Children: 1
- Education: Empire State College (BA); Queens College (MA)

James Vacca is an American politician who served in the New York City Council from the 13th district from 2006 to 2017. He is a Democrat.

The district includes Allerton, Baychester, Bronx Park, City Island, Country Club, Ferry Point Park, Hart Island, Morris Park, Pelham Bay, Pelham Bay Park, Pelham Islands, Schuylerville, Throggs Neck, part of Van Nest and Westchester Square in The Bronx.

== Early life and education ==
Vacca was born in The Bronx and raised in Pelham Bay. He attended New York City public schools, graduating from P.S. 71, J.H.S. 101, and Christopher Columbus High School in the Bronx. He holds a Bachelor of Arts degree in political science from Empire State College and a Master of Arts in Urban Studies from Queens College, City University of New York.

== Career ==
In 1980, Vacca was appointed to district manager of Bronx Community Board 10. At 25 years old, he was one of the youngest district managers in the city's history. Under his leadership, community board 10 was frequently ranked the cleanest and safest community board in the Bronx.

=== New York City Council ===
In early 2005, with Councilwoman Madeline Provenzano term-limited out of office, Vacca announced his candidacy for the 13th Council District seat. Already an established public figure in the East Bronx due to his years as district manager, he was endorsed by Congressman Joseph Crowley and Assemblyman Michael Benedetto, as well as dozens of community and civic groups, and The New York Times.

In the September 13, 2005, Democratic Party primary, he faced four opponents: former Assemblyman Stephen B. Kaufman, Joseph A. McManus, Ismael Betancourt, and Egidio Joseph Sementelli. He won with nearly 40% of the vote; Kaufman captured roughly 25%. In the general election, he defeated Philip Foglia, candidate of the Republican, Conservative and Independence Party lines, with 64% of the vote.

In 2009, facing a little-known challenger running on the Conservative Party line, Vacca was easily re-elected to a second term, winning 92.8% of the vote. He was re-elected to his final term in 2013 with over 83% of the vote.

On the Council, Vacca was an advocate for responsible zoning laws and for prevention of overdevelopment. In 2007, Vacca was also named co-chair of the council's Working Group on School Governance and Mayoral Control, established to guide the council recommendations upon the expiration of mayoral control in 2009. After months of informal meetings with educators, union leaders, Administration officials, advocates, and parents, the Working Group issued its report in June 2009. The report suggested a new system of municipal control. Later that month, the New York State legislature passed 8903-A, a bill relating to the management and operation of the New York City School District.

Vacca has also been influential in protecting funding for the Fire Department of New York. He also has been a proponent of congestion pricing.

In August 2017, as chair of the Committee on Technology, Vacca introduced an algorithmic transparency bill, Int. 1696–2017, that would require city agencies "that use algorithms or other automated processing methods that target services, impose penalties, or police persons to publish the source code used for such processing"—a nationwide first. The bill was influenced by the scholarship of Danah boyd, Kate Crawford, and Cathy O'Neil. After public hearings and negotiation with city agencies, an amended bill, Int. 1696-A, passed the City Council unanimously in December 2017. The amended bill creates a task force to consider the issue and report to the city in late 2019. Researcher Julia Powles, assessing the amended bill in The New Yorker, predicted that the task force's findings will have significant international and domestic impact, but warned that the bill's lack of reporting requirements for city agencies means the task force will need to rely on agencies' voluntary disclosures, which may be sparse.

During the 2023 New York Council elections, Vacca withdrew his support for Democratic candidate Marjorie Velazquez after she expressed support for the construction of 349 housing units (168 of which were affordable housing) in Throggs Neck.

=== Teaching ===
Since 2003, Vacca has taught New York City politics, public administration, and non-profit management at CUNY Queens College. In 2018, he was appointed as Distinguished Lecturer in the Urban Studies department. He co-founded the college's food pantry in 2023 to address food insecurity among students. Continuing his work from his days as chairperson of the New York City Council's Committee on Technology, he is a member of the Queens College Tech Incubator's Advisory Board.

== Personal life ==
Vacca came out as gay in 2016.

== Election history ==
Election history
| Location | Year | Election | Results |
|---|---|---|---|
| NYC Council District 13 | 2005 | Democratic; Primary | √ James Vacca 38.41% Stephen Kaufman 25.70% Joseph McManus 20.41% Ismael Betancourt Jr. 10.15% Egidio Sementilli 5.33% |
| NYC Council District 13 | 2005 | General | √ James Vacca (D) 64.39% Philip F. Foglia (R) 35.61% |
| NYC Council District 13 | 2009 | General | √ James Vacca (D) 94.22% Frank Dellavalle (Conservative) 5.78% |
| NYC Council District 13 | 2013 | General | √ James Vacca (D) 83.23% William Britt (R) 16.70% |

== See also ==
- LGBT culture in New York City
- List of LGBT people from New York City
- NYC Pride March

Political offices
| Preceded by Madeline Provenzano | New York City Council, 13th district 2006–2017 | Succeeded by Mark Gjonaj |
