= John Zaccaro Jr. =

American politician

John Zaccaro
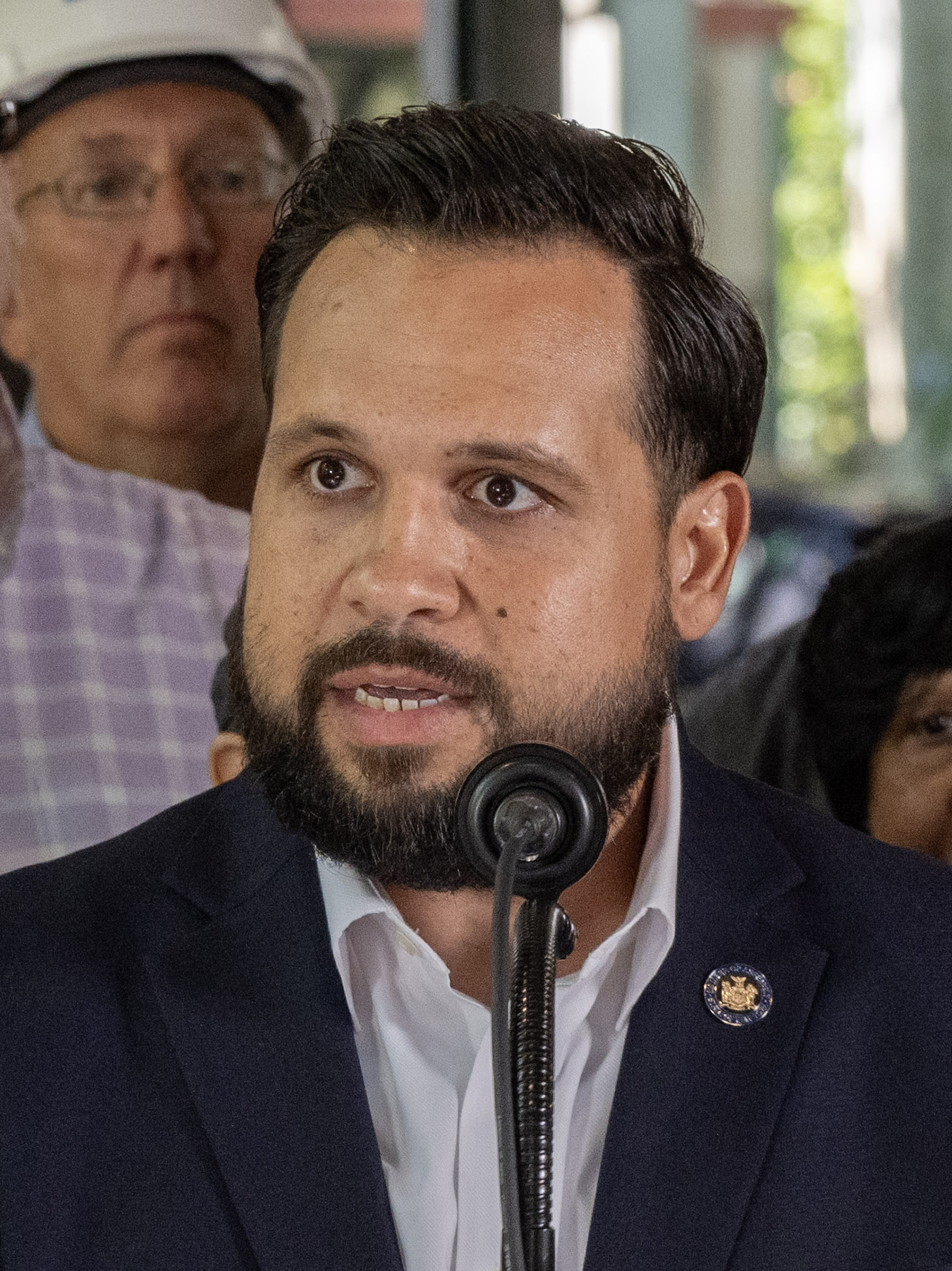
- Zaccaro in 2025

Member of the New York State Assembly from the 80th district
- Incumbent
- Assumed office January 1, 2023
- Preceded by: Nathalia Fernandez

Personal details
- Born: The Bronx, New York, U.S.
- Party: Democratic
- Children: 3
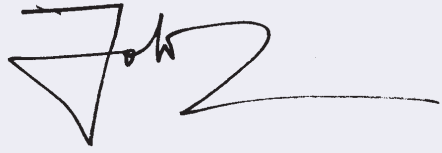
- Signature

John D. Zaccaro Jr. is an American politician serving as a member of the New York State Assembly for the 80th district. Elected in November 2022, he assumed office on January 1, 2023.

== Early life ==
Zaccaro was born and raised in the Bronx in New York City. He attended DeWitt Clinton High School and CUNY Prep, a transitional high school operated by the City University of New York.

== Career ==
Zaccaro began his career as an intern for the New York City Council and later became a housing organizer. He later served as the chief of staff for Councilman Rafael Salamanca. Zaccaro was a member of Bronx Community Board 7. He was elected to the New York State Assembly in November 2022 and assumed office on January 1, 2023.

== Personal life ==
Zaccaro is of Puerto Rican, Colombian and Italian descent. He is not related to real-estate developer John Zaccaro, the spouse of Geraldine Ferraro, though he shares a name with the couple's son.
