= Daniel Squadron =

American politician

Daniel L. Squadron
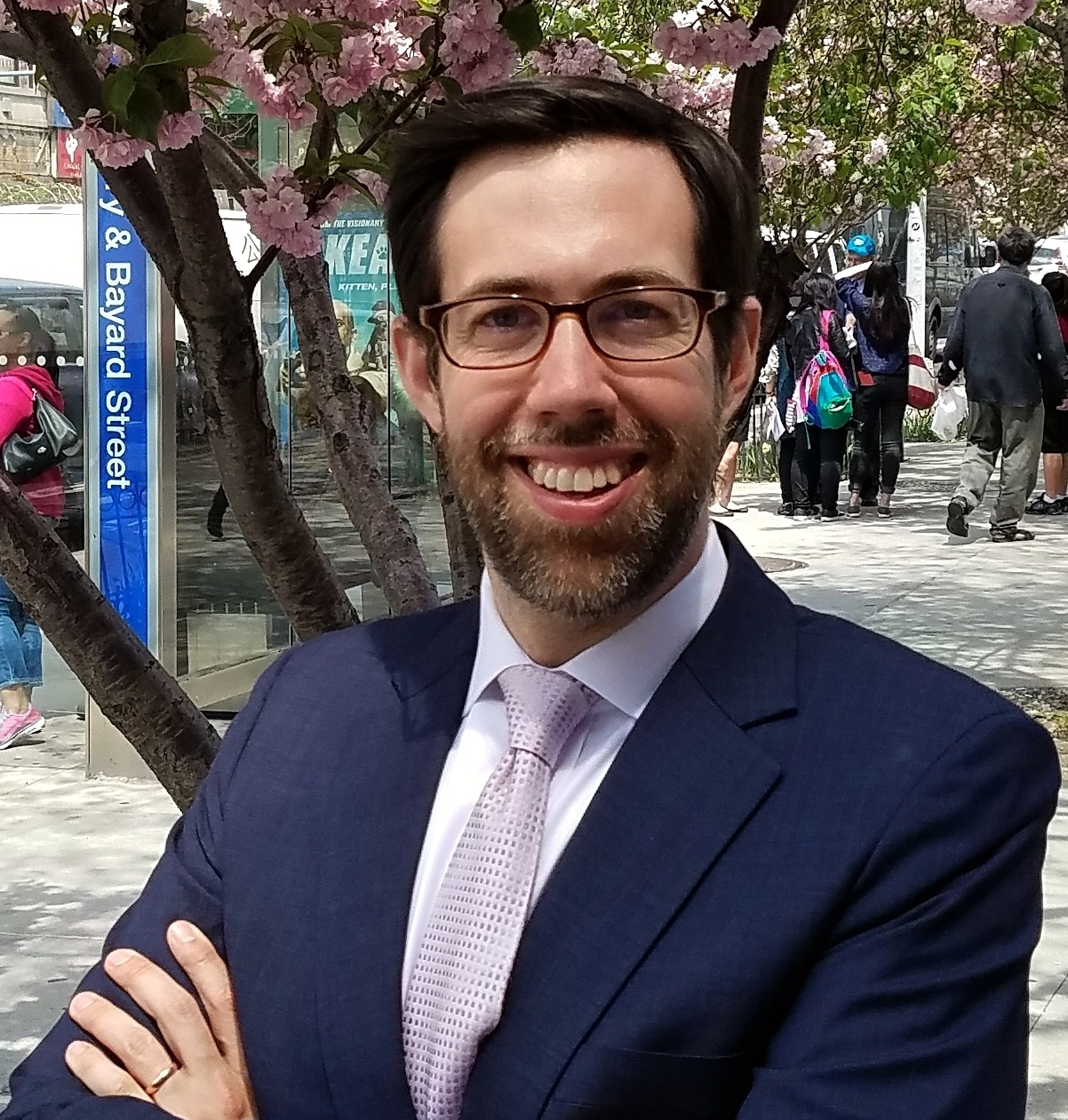
- Squadron in 2016

Member of the New York State Senate
- In office January 1, 2009 – August 11, 2017
- Preceded by: Martin Connor
- Succeeded by: Brian P. Kavanagh
- Constituency: 25th district (2009-2012); 26th district (2013-2017)

Personal details
- Born: November 9, 1979 (age 47) The Bronx, New York City, U.S.
- Party: Democratic
- Other political affiliations: Working Families Party
- Spouse: Elizabeth Weinstein
- Children: 2
- Parent: Howard Squadron (father)
- Education: Yale University (B.A.)

Daniel L. Squadron (born November 9, 1979) is an American politician and former member of the New York State Senate for the 26th district.

A Democrat, Squadron was elected a New York State Senator in 2008, and was a candidate in the 2013 race for New York Public Advocate. In August 2017, he resigned from the NY State Senate to work with entrepreneur Adam Pritzker and Jeffrey Sachs of Columbia University to launch Future Now, a national initiative to promote "policies focused on creating a better, healthier, fairer future."

== Early life and education ==
Daniel Squadron was born in 1979. His mother is Anne Strickland Squadron, and his father was Howard Squadron of the law firm Squadron, Ellenoff, Plesent & Sheinfeld and chairman of the Conference of Presidents of Major American Jewish Organizations. His brother, Bill Squadron, was the head of Bloomberg Sports.

Squadron attended the private Fieldston School and graduated from Yale University in 2003. During his junior year, he cofounded and managed What Bar, a bar near Columbia University.

== Career ==
=== Early career ===
Squadron served as a consultant to New York City's Department of Education and worked as a staffer on Congressman Anthony Weiner's 2005 mayoral campaign. He served as an aide to U.S. Senator Charles Schumer, helping the New York senator with his book Positively American: Winning Back the Middle-Class Majority One Family at a Time (2007).

=== State senate ===
Squadron ran for the 25th district of the New York State Senate in 2008. He received the endorsements of Schumer, Congressman Anthony Weiner, Manhattan Borough President Scott Stringer, and Mayor Michael Bloomberg. Assisted by family friends, Schumer supporters, and an aggressive campaign strategy, Squadron defeated incumbent state senator Martin Connor and took 54% of the vote. On November 6, 2012, Squadron was elected to the state senate again, this time to represent the 26th district. He beat his Republican opponent, J. Haro, 86% to 14%. Squadron won reelection in 2014 in a landslide over Republican candidate Wave Chan; and he ran unopposed in 2016, running on both the Democratic and Working Families Party lines.

Squadron's platform included opposition to luxury development in Brooklyn Bridge Park. He negotiated a deal that reduced and delayed housing in the park, and has been credited with returning $11 million in capital funding that had been cut from the park's budget. Squadron also secured millions for a waterfront park project on the Lower East Side at Pier 42, along with Schumer, and also helped secure the future of Governors Island. Squadron's proposal to link New York's wealthiest parks conservancies with under-resourced neighborhood parks resulted in hundreds of millions in new funding for community parks.

In 2010, Squadron sponsored the law that brought billions in federal dollars to New York City's public housing. Squadron also passed legislation expanding middle class eligibility for the Mitchell-Lama Housing Program.

Squadron's tenure included a noted focus on ethics and campaign finance reform. He passed the law prohibiting public officers from using government resources for their own for-profit business. Squadron also unsuccessfully pushed to close the "LLC Loophole," which allows nearly unlimited, often anonymous campaign contributions to flood the political process.

On August 9, 2017, Squadron announced his resignation from the Senate in an opinion piece published in the Daily News. He cited "heavily invested special interests" and "cynical political deals," adding, "And the status quo has proven extraordinarily durable: It barely shuddered when the leaders of both legislative chambers [Senate Majority Leader Dean Skelos and Assembly Speaker Sheldon Silver] were convicted of corruption."

=== Race for New York City public advocate ===
In the race for public advocate, Squadron had the endorsements of mentor Senator Chuck Schumer, and former Public Advocates Betsy Gotbaum and Mark Green. Squadron placed second in the primary and advanced to an October 2013 runoff primary, which he lost to Letitia James, by 59% to 41%.

=== Post-Senate career ===
In August 2017, Squadron announced he would be working with entrepreneur Adam Pritzker and Jeffrey Sachs of Columbia University on a national initiative focused on "stronger candidates, a sharpened approach and better policies at the state level", emphasizing "policies focused on creating a better, healthier, fairer future". In October 2017, that initiative was launched as Future Now. The initiative is now known as The States Project.

== Personal life ==
Squadron is married to Elizabeth Weinstein, a former director in Mayor Bloomberg's Office of Operations. The couple were set up by Schumer and his wife, Iris Weinshall, for whom Weinstein worked as chief of staff at the New York City Department of Transportation. Squadron lives in Carroll Gardens with his wife and two sons.

According to Squadron, a trust fund established for him and 18 other family members was lost in the Bernie Madoff ponzi scheme.
