= Howard Squadron =

American lawyer

Howard Squadron (1926–2001) was senior partner in the law firm Squadron Ellenoff Plesent & Sheinfeld with clients such as Rupert Murdoch, Playboy magazine, Helmsley-Spear management company, mortgage brokers, and developers. He also represented New York City's former chief medical examiner, Eliot M. Gross in his libel suit against the New York Times. In 1970, he was in a city race for Congress to represent the West Side of Manhattan.

He was a national spokesman for American Jews, appearing regularly in support of Israel on Barry Gray's radio show and David Susskind's TV program. He also helped found the International Center of Photography and helped save the City Center in the 1970s. He also advised David Dinkins before he was New York City mayor and Donna Shalala when she led Hunter College.

== Early life and education ==
Born in the Bronx, son of a deli counterperson, he graduated from City College and was one of the youngest students in his class at Columbia Law School.

== Family ==
His first wife, the former Lorraine Vlosky, died in 1967, and he was left a widower with three children until 1972, when he married Anne Strickland. They in turn, had two children, including Daniel Squadron, the former New York State senator for parts of Brooklyn and Manhattan. His other children are Bill, Richard, Diane, and Seth.

Squadron died from melanoma at his home in Riverdale, Bronx, on December 26, 2001, at the age of 75.
