= New York's 80th State Assembly district =

American legislative district

Assemblymember
John Zaccaro Jr. D–Pelham Parkway

New York's 80th State Assembly district is one of the 150 districts in the New York State Assembly. It has been represented by John Zaccaro Jr. since 2023, succeeding Nathalia Fernandez.

== Geography ==
District 80 is in The Bronx. It contains the neighborhoods of Norwood, Allerton, Pelham Gardens, Pelham Parkway and Morris Park.

== Recent election results ==
=== 2026 ===
2026 New York State Assembly election, District 80
Party	Candidate	Votes	%
Democratic	John Zaccaro Jr. (incumbent)		
Conservative	Denise Smith		
Write-in			
Total votes			100.0

=== 2024 ===
2024 New York State Assembly election, District 80
Party	Candidate	Votes	%
Democratic	John Zaccaro Jr. (incumbent)	20,766	67.6
Republican	Nicholas Marricco	8,243	26.8
Conservative	Grace Marrero	1,605	5.2
Write-in		123	0.4
Total votes		30,737	100.0
Democratic hold			

=== 2022 ===
2022 New York State Assembly election, District 80
Party	Candidate	Votes	%
Democratic	John Zaccaro Jr.	12,212	69.5
Republican	Phyllis Nastasio	4,948	
Conservative	Phyllis Nastasio	402	
Total	Phyllis Nastasio	5,350	30.4
Write-in		17	0.1
Total votes		17,579	100.0
Democratic hold			

=== 2020 ===
2020 New York State Assembly election, District 80
Party	Candidate	Votes	%
Democratic	Nathalia Fernandez (incumbent)	28,385	79.2
Republican	Gene DeFrancis	6,337	17.7
Conservative	Elizabeth Perri	1,084	3.0
Write-in		50	0.1
Total votes		35,856	100.0
Democratic hold			

=== 2018 ===
2018 New York State Assembly election, District 80
Party	Candidate	Votes	%
Democratic	Nathalia Fernandez (incumbent)	21,241	86.4
Republican	Louis Perri	2,939	
Conservative	Louis Perri	375	
Total	Louis Perri	3,314	13.5
Write-in		16	0.1
Total votes		24,571	100.0
Democratic hold			

=== 2018 special ===
2018 New York State Assembly special election, District 80
Party	Candidate	Votes	%
Democratic	Nathalia Fernandez	1,917	
Independence	Nathalia Fernandez	60	
Total	Nathalia Fernandez	1,977	80.8
Republican	Gene DeFrancis	335	
Conservative	Gene DeFrancis	99	
Reform	Gene DeFrancis	27	
Total	Gene DeFrancis	461	18.8
Write-in		9	0.4
Total votes		2,447	100.0
Democratic hold			

=== 2016 ===
2016 New York State Assembly election, District 80
Party	Candidate	Votes	%
Democratic	Mark Gjonaj (incumbent)	24,959	85.1
Republican	Nicholas Marricco	3,391	11.6
Conservative	Robert Goodman	953	3.2
Write-in		37	0.1
Total votes		29,340	100.0
Democratic hold			

=== 2014 ===
2014 New York State Assembly election, District 80
Party	Candidate	Votes	%
Democratic	Mark Gjonaj (incumbent)	9,816	83.7
Republican	Robert Goodman	1,496	
Conservative	Robert Goodman	396	
Total	Robert Goodman	1,892	16.1
Write-in		20	0.2
Total votes		11,728	100.0
Democratic hold			

=== 2012 ===
2012 New York State Assembly election, District 80
Primary election
Party	Candidate	Votes	%
Democratic	Mark Gjonaj	2,559	50.9
Democratic	Naomi Rivera (incumbent)	2,033	40.5
Democratic	Adam Bermudez	265	5.3
Democratic	Irene Rukaj	157	3.1
Write-in		11	0.2
Total votes		5,025	100.0
General election
Democratic	Mark Gjonaj	22,386	79.0
Republican	Nicole Torres	2,600	9.2
Working Families	Naomi Rivera (incumbent)	2,186	7.7
Conservative	Patrick McManus	861	3.0
Green	William Edstrom	274	1.0
Write-in		16	0.1
Total votes		28,323	100.0
Democratic hold			

=== 2010 ===
2010 New York State Assembly election, District 80
Primary election
Party	Candidate	Votes	%
Democratic	Naomi Rivera (incumbent)	2,689	69.5
Democratic	Robert Giuffre	1,166	30.1
Write-in		14	0.4
Total votes		3,869	100.0
General election
Democratic	Naomi Rivera	10,762	
Working Families	Naomi Rivera	825	
Total	Naomi Rivera (incumbent)	11,587	75.6
Republican	Joseph DeLuna	3,094	20.2
Conservative	Robert Goodman	617	4.0
Write-in		34	0.2
Total votes		15,332	100.0
Democratic hold			
