= Shirley Aldebol =

American politician

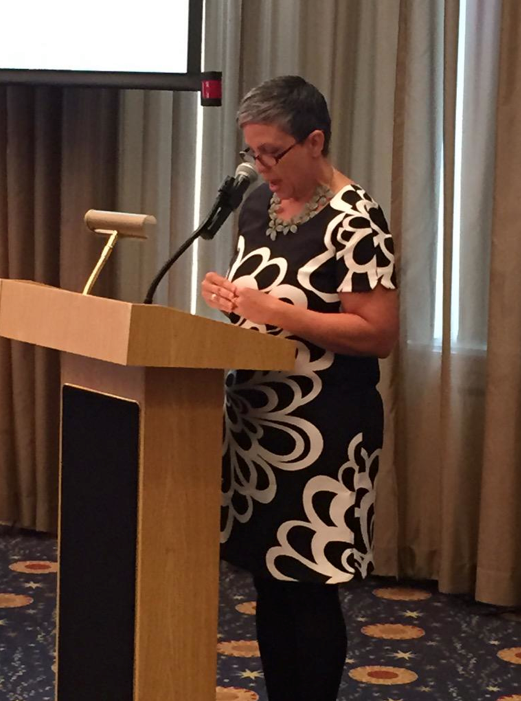
- Aldebol in 2015

Member of the New York City Council from the 13th district
- Incumbent
- Assumed office January 1, 2026
- Preceded by: Kristy Marmorato

Personal details
- Born: New York City, New York, U.S.
- Party: Democratic
- Education: Barnard College (BA)
- Website: Campaign website

Shirley Aldebol is an American union leader and politician who has been a member of the New York City Council representing the 13th district since 2026. Her district covers much of the East Bronx. Prior to holding public office, Aldebol served as executive vice president of labor union SEIU 32BJ.

== Early life ==
Shirley Aldebol was born in the South Bronx to Puerto Rican parents, and later lived in the Soundview-Clason Point area, where her parents owned a bodega. She attended Cardinal Spellman High School and later graduated from Barnard College of Columbia University with a bachelor's degree.

== Career ==
Before being elected to the New York City Council, Aldebol was the executive vice president of SEIU 32BJ, a New York City-based branch of Service Employees International Union representing building workers, overseeing the public schools division in the New York metropolitan area.

=== New York City Council ===
Aldebol ran for the New York City Council's 13th district in 2025 on the Democratic and Working Families Party ballot lines. She won the Democratic primary on June 24, and went on to defeat incumbent Republican Kristy Marmorato during the general election, making the 13th district the only seat to change hands in the election.

Aldebol's campaign focused on expanding affordable housing and increasing "good jobs." She was backed by pro-housing groups, such as Open New York, and committed to building more affordable housing in the district. She assumed office on January 1, 2026.

Aldebol serves as chair of the Civil Service and Labor Committee, and is a member of the Aging, Consumer and Worker Protection, Finance, Hospitals, Mental Health and Addiction, Women and Gender Equity Committees.

== Electoral history ==
=== 2025 ===
2025 New York City Council Democratic primary, 13th district
Party	Candidate	Maximum round	Maximum votes	Share in maximum round	Maximum votes First round votes Transfer votes
Democratic	Shirley Aldebol	6	4,688	56.0%	
Democratic	Jacqueline J. Torres	6	3,679	44.0%	
Democratic	David A. Diaz	5	2,647	27.3%	
Democratic	John Perez	4	1,711	16.4%	
Democratic	Joel Rivera	3	1,251	11.3%	
Democratic	Theona S. Reets-Dupont	2	692	6.1%	
Write-In		1	96	0.8%	

2025 New York City Council election, 13th district
Party	Candidate	Votes	%
Democratic	Shirley Aldebol	16,037	46.1
Working Families	Shirley Aldebol	2,011	5.8
Total	Shirley Aldebol	18,048	51.9
Republican	Kristy Marmorato	14,242	41.0
Conservative	Kristy Marmorato	1,703	4.9
Total	Kristy Marmorato (incumbent)	15,945	45.9
The Unity	Joel Rivera	716	2.1
Write-in		41	0.1
Total votes		34,750	100.0
Democratic gain from Republican			

== Personal life ==
Aldebol has one son, Emilio. She lives in Throggs Neck.
