= 2013 New York City Public Advocate election =

- November 5, 2013
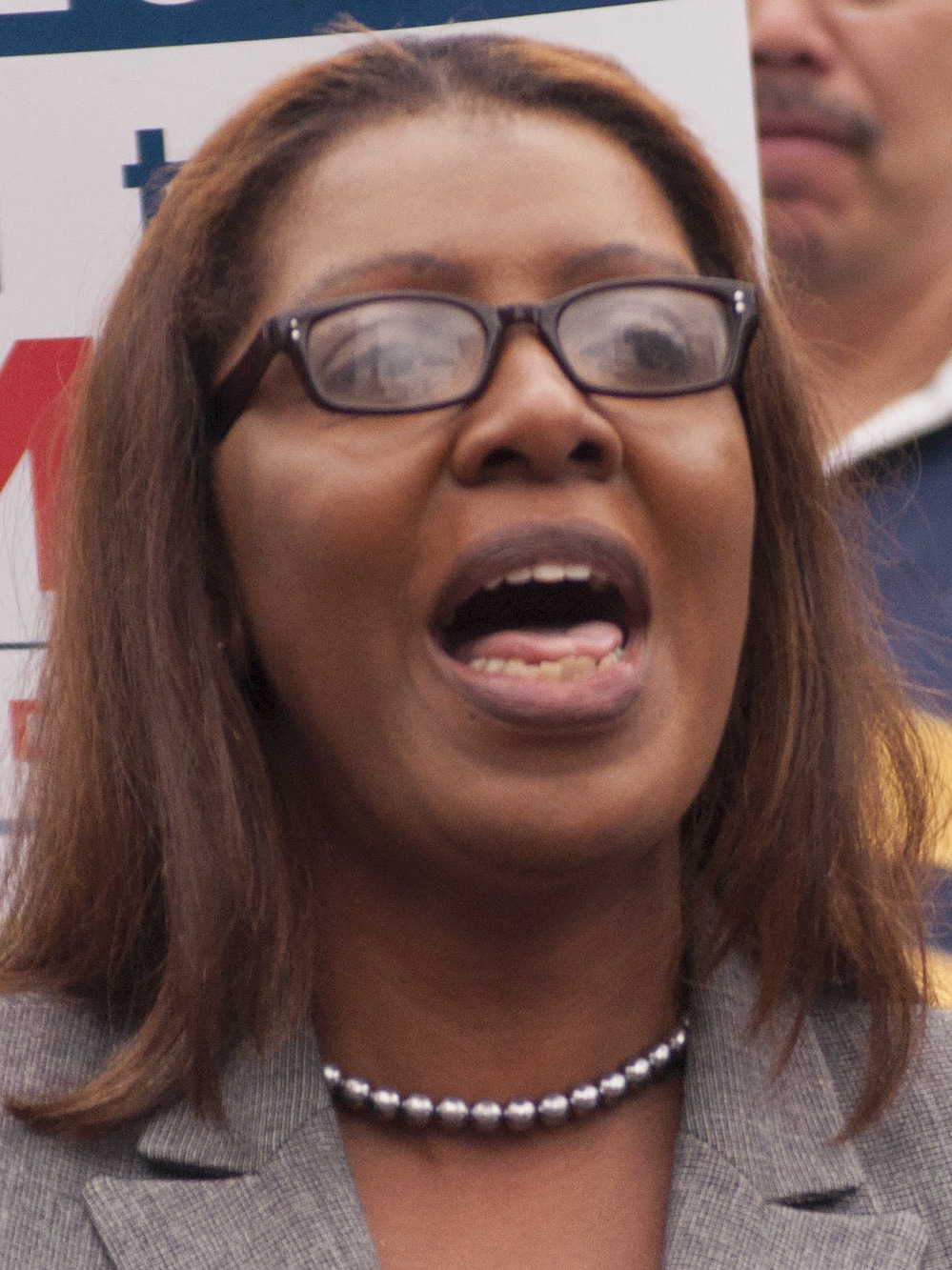

Candidate	Letitia James	Robert Maresca
Party	Democratic	Conservative
Alliance	Working Families
Popular vote	770,764	112,967
Percentage	83.6%	12.2%
- James: 50–60% 60–70% 70–80% 80–90% >90% Maresca: 50–60%
Public Advocate before election
Bill de Blasio
Democratic
Elected Public Advocate
Letitia James
Democratic

The 2013 New York City public advocate election was held on November 5, 2013, along with elections for the mayor, comptroller, borough presidents, and members of the New York City Council. Incumbent Democratic Public Advocate Bill de Blasio, serving his first term, ran for mayor of New York City rather than seek re-election.

The Democratic Party held its primary on September 10, and since no candidate reached 40%, a runoff was held on October 1 between the top two candidates, Councilwoman Letitia James and State Senator Daniel Squadron. James won the runoff to become the Democratic nominee.

The Republican Party did not nominate a candidate. In the general election, James faced Green Party nominee James Lane and Conservative nominee Robert Maresca, as well as various minor party candidates.

James won the general election in a landslide.

== Democratic primary ==
=== Candidates ===
==== Declared ====
- Cathy Guerriero, adjunct professor at Columbia University and New York University
- Letitia James, New York City councilwoman (also received the Working Families Party nomination)
- Reshma Saujani, former deputy public advocate and candidate for New York's 14th congressional district in 2010
- Daniel Squadron, state senator
- Sidique Wai, New York University professor

==== Declined ====
- Bill de Blasio, incumbent public advocate (running for mayor)

=== Tone ===
The runoff between Letitia James and Daniel Squadron was characterized as bitter by most of the media outlets that covered it.

=== Polling ===
Poll source	Date(s) administered	Sample size	Margin of error	Catherine Guerriero	Letitia James	Reshma Saujani	Daniel Squadron	Sidique Wai	Other	Undecided
Marist	August 12–14, 2013	355	± 5.2%	12%	16%	3%	12%	2%	6%	49%
Marist	June 17–21, 2013	689	± 4%	16%	17%	8%	4%	—	<1%	54%

=== Debates ===
2013 New York City public advocate election Democratic primary debates
No.	Date	Host	Moderator	Link	Democratic	Democratic	Democratic	Democratic	Democratic
Key: P Participant A Absent N Not invited I Invited W Withdrawn									
Key: P Participant A Absent N Not invited I Invited W Withdrawn					Catherine Guerriero	Letitia James	Reshma Saujani	Daniel Squadron	Sidique Wai
1	Aug. 15, 2013	Citizens Committee of New York; Citizens Union; Gothamist; Hispanic Federation; New York One; New York One Noticias; New York City Campaign Finance Board; Transportation Alternatives; WNYC-FM	Errol Louis	YouTube	P	P	P	P	P
2	Aug. 25, 2013	New York City Campaign Finance Board; Telemundo Nueva York; The Wall Street Journal; WNBC	Melissa Russo; David Ushery	YouTube	P	P	P	P	N

2013 New York City public advocate election Democratic primary run-off debate
No.	Date	Host	Moderator	Link	Democratic	Democratic
Key: P Participant A Absent N Not invited I Invited W Withdrawn						
Key: P Participant A Absent N Not invited I Invited W Withdrawn					Letitia James	Daniel Squadron
1	Sep. 24, 2013	Citizens Committee of New York; Citizens Union; Gothamist; Hispanic Federation; New York One; New York One Noticias; New York City Campaign Finance Board; Transportation Alternatives; WNYC-FM	Brian Lehrer; Errol Louis	YouTube	P	P

=== Results ===
Primary results by state assembly district James: 30%–40%; 40%–50%; 50%–60%; 60%–70%; 70%–80%; Squadron: 20%–30%; 30%–40%; 40%–50%; 50%–60%; 60%–70%

2013 New York City public advocate election Democratic primary results
Party	Candidate	Votes	%
Democratic	Letitia James	191,347	36.10
Democratic	Daniel Squadron	178,151	33.61
Democratic	Reshma Saujani	76,983	14.52
Democratic	Cathy Guerriero	69,025	13.02
Democratic	Sidique Wai	14,409	2.72
Democratic	Write-in	174	0.03
Total votes		530,089	100.00

Runoff results by state assembly district James: 50%–60%; 60%–70%; 70%–80%; 80%–90%; 90%–100%; Squadron: 50%–60%; 60%–70%; 70%–80%; 80%–90%

2013 New York City public advocate election Democratic primary runoff results
Party	Candidate	Votes	%
Democratic	Letitia James	119,604	59.02
Democratic	Daniel Squadron	83,043	40.98
Total votes		202,647	100.00

== Republican primary ==
No Republican candidate filed to run for the office.

== Major third parties ==
Besides the two main parties, the Conservative, Green, Independence and Working Families parties are qualified New York parties. These parties have automatic ballot access.

=== Conservative ===
==== Nominee ====
- Robert Maresca

=== Green ===
==== Nominee ====
- James Lane, internet media professional and Green Party activist

=== Working Families ===
==== Nominee ====
- Letitia James, New York City councilwoman from Brooklyn

== Minor third parties ==
The following parties without automatic ballot access succeeded in petitioning onto the ballot:

=== Freedom ===
==== Nominee ====
- Michael K. Lloyd

=== Libertarian ===
==== Nominee ====
- Alex Merced, author, columnist, and blogger

=== Socialist Worker ===
==== Nominee ====
- Deborah O. Liatos

=== Students First ===
==== Nominee ====
- Mollena G. Fabricant

=== War Veterans ===
==== Nominee ====
- Irene Estrada

== General election results ==
2013 New York City public advocate general election results
Party	Candidate	Votes	%
Democratic	Letitia James	761,058	77.87%
Working Families	Letitia James	53,821	5.51%
Total	Letitia James	814,879	83.37%
Conservative	Robert Maresca	119,768	12.25%
Green	James Lane	16,974	1.74%
Libertarian	Alex Merced	10,419	1.07%
Socialist Workers	Deborah O. Liatos	5,114	0.52%
War Veterans	Irene Estrada	4,216	0.43%
Students First	Mollina G. Fabricant	2,391	0.24%
Freedom Party of New York	Michael K. Lloyd	1,799	0.18%
Total votes		975,560	100%
