= New York City's 13th City Council district =

- Boundaries following the 2020 census

Government
  - Councilmember: Shirley Aldebol (D—Throggs Neck)

Population (2010)
  - Total: 168,530

Demographics
  - White: 40%
  - Hispanic: 39%
  - Black: 12%
  - Asian: 7%
  - Other: 2%

Registration
  - Democratic: 61.5%
  - Republican: 14.6%
  - No party preference: 19.7%
- Registered voters (2021) 100,602

New York City's 13th City Council district is one of 51 districts in the New York City Council. It is currently represented by Democrat Shirley Aldebol following her victory over then-incumbent Kristy Marmorato in 2025.

== Geography ==
District 13 covers a series of smaller neighborhoods in the East Bronx, including Throggs Neck, Pelham Parkway, Morris Park, Pelham Bay, Pelham Gardens, Schuylerville, Country Club, Locust Point, and Westchester Square, as well as parts of Allerton and Van Nest.

City Island, a small populated island to the east of the borough's mainland, is a part of the district. Pelham Bay Park, the city's largest park, is also located within the district, as are Ferry Point Park and Hart Island.

The district overlaps with Bronx Community Boards 9, 10, and 11, and is contained almost entirely within New York's 14th congressional district, with a small extension into the 16th district. It also overlaps with the 32nd, 33rd, 34th, and 36th districts of the New York State Senate, and with the 80th, 82nd, and 87th districts of the New York State Assembly.

== Recent election results ==
=== 2025 ===
2025 New York City Council election, District 13 Democratic primary
Party	Candidate	Maximum round	Maximum votes	Share in maximum round	Maximum votes First round votes Transfer votes
Democratic	Shirley Aldebol	6	4,688	56.0%	
Democratic	Jacqueline Torres	6	3,679	44.0%	
Democratic	David Diaz	5	2,647	27.3%	
Democratic	John Perez	4	1,711	16.4%	
Democratic	Joel Rivera	3	1,251	11.3%	
Democratic	Theona Reets-DuPont	2	692	6.1%	
Write-in		1	96	0.8%	

2025 New York City Council election, District 13 general election
Party	Candidate	Votes	%
Democratic	Shirley Aldebol	16,037	
Working Families	Shirley Aldebol	2,011	
Total	Shirley Aldebol	18,048	51.9
Republican	Kristy Marmorato	14,242	
Conservative	Kristy Marmorato	1,703	
Total	Kristy Marmorato (incumbent)	15,945	45.9
Unity	Joel Rivera	716	2.1
Write-in		41	0.1
Total votes		34,750	100.0
Democratic gain from Republican			

=== 2023 ===
Due to redistricting and the 2020 changes to the New York City Charter, councilmembers elected during the 2021 and 2023 City Council elections will serve two-year terms, with full four-year terms resuming after the 2025 New York City Council elections.

2023 New York City Council election, District 13 Republican primary
Party	Candidate	Maximum round	Maximum votes	Share in maximum round	Maximum votes First round votes Transfer votes
Republican	Kristy Marmorato	3	957	51.5%	
Republican	George Havranek	3	902	48.5%	
Republican	Samantha Zherka	2	163	8.5%	
Write-in		1	10	0.5%	

2023 New York City Council election, District 13 Democratic primary, Conservative primary and general election
Primary election
Party	Candidate	Votes	%
Democratic	Marjorie Velázquez (incumbent)	2,795	65.5
Democratic	Bernadette Ferrara	822	19.3
Democratic	Irene Estrada	313	7.3
Democratic	John Perez	238	5.6
Write-in		102	2.4
Total votes		4,270	100.0
Conservative	Kristy Marmorato	61	54.5
Conservative	George Havranek	35	31.3
Conservative	Samantha Zherka	16	14.3
Write-in		0	0.0
Total votes		112	100.0
General election
Republican	Kristy Marmorato	5,775	
Conservative	Kristy Marmorato	791	
Total	Kristy Marmorato	6,566	51.5
Democratic	Marjorie Velázquez (incumbent)	6,105	47.9
Write-in		81	0.6
Total votes		12,752	
Republican gain from Democratic			

=== 2021 ===
In 2019, voters in New York City approved Ballot Question 1, which implemented ranked-choice voting in all local elections. Under the new system, voters have the option to rank up to five candidates for every local office. Voters whose first-choice candidates fare poorly will have their votes redistributed to other candidates in their ranking until one candidate surpasses the 50 percent threshold. If one candidate surpasses 50 percent in first-choice votes, then ranked-choice tabulations will not occur.

An interactive map of District 13

2021 New York City Council election, District 13
Primary election
Party	Candidate	Votes	%
Democratic	Marjorie Velázquez	5,608	56.3
Democratic	Monique Johnson	2,575	25.9
Democratic	Irene Estrada	600	6.0
Democratic	Marilyn Soto	585	5.9
Democratic	John Perez	545	5.5
Write-in		47	0.5
Total votes		9,960	100
General election
Democratic	Marjorie Velázquez	10,201	56.3
Republican	Aleksander Mici	7,893	43.5
Write-in		41	0.2
Total votes		18,135	100
Democratic hold			

=== 2017 ===
v

2017 New York City Council election, District 13
Primary election
Party	Candidate	Votes	%
Democratic	Mark Gjonaj	3,503	38.5
Democratic	Marjorie Velázquez	3,113	34.2
Democratic	John Doyle	1,728	19.0
Democratic	Victor Ortiz	481	5.3
Democratic	Egidio Sementilli	270	3.0
Write-in		14	0.0
Total votes		9,109	100
General election
Democratic	Mark Gjonaj	10,602	48.6
Republican	John Cerini	6,313	
Conservative	John Cerini	1,297	
Reform	John Cerini	181	
Total	John Cerini	7,791	35.7
Working Families	Marjorie Velázquez	2,829	13.0
Liberal	John Doyle	442	2.0
New Bronx	Alex Gomez	121	0.6
Write-in		21	0.1
Total votes		21,806	100
Democratic hold			

=== 2013 ===
2013 New York City Council election, District 13
Party	Candidate	Votes	%
Democratic	James Vacca (incumbent)	13,793	83.2
Republican	William Britt	2,103	
Conservative	William Britt	665	
Total	William Britt	2,768	16.7
Write-in		11	0.1
Total votes		16,572	100
Democratic hold			

=== 2009 ===
2009 New York City Council election, District 13
Party	Candidate	Votes	%
Democratic	James Vacca	10,127	
Republican	James Vacca	5,800	
Total	James Vacca (incumbent)	15,927	92.9
Conservative	Frank Valle	1,222	7.1
Write-in		1	0.0
Total votes		17,150	100
Democratic hold			
