= Mark Gjonaj =

American politician

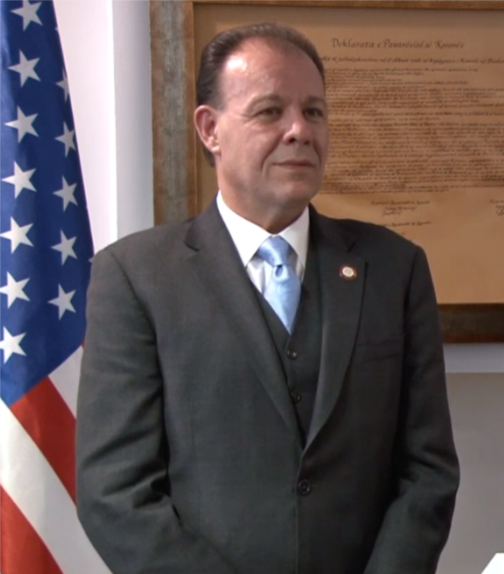

Member of the New York City Council from the 13th district
- In office January 1, 2018 – December 31, 2021
- Preceded by: James Vacca
- Succeeded by: Marjorie Velázquez

Member of the New York State Assembly from the 80th district
- In office January 1, 2013 – December 31, 2017
- Preceded by: Naomi Rivera
- Succeeded by: Nathalia Fernandez

Personal details
- Born: 1968 (age 57–58) Fordham, Bronx, New York City, U.S.
- Party: Democratic
- Children: 2
- Education: St. John's University (BA)

Mark Gjonaj (/ˈdʒoʊnaɪ/ JOH-nye; born December 1968) is an American politician who served in the New York City Council from the 13th district from 2018 to 2021. He previously represented the 80th district of the New York State Assembly from 2013 to 2017. His district encompasses Morris Park, Pelham Parkway, Pelham Gardens, and Norwood, among other communities of the Bronx.

== Early life and education ==
Gjonaj was born and raised in Fordham, Bronx to an Albanian family from Reč, Montenegro. He attended St. Raymond High School for Boys and graduated from St. John's University with a Bachelor of Arts degree.

== Career ==
Gjonaj is the president of M P Realty Group Corp., a real estate brokerage firm that he founded in 1999. His political experience prior to election was as a member of the New York City Taxi and Limousine Commission.

=== New York State Assembly ===
Gjonaj defeated incumbent assemblywoman Naomi Rivera in the 2012 Democratic primary race. On November 6, 2012, he won the general election with 79% of the vote.

=== New York City Council ===
In 2017, Gjonaj entered the race to represent the 13th District of the New York City Council, to replace Councilman James Vacca, who had to step down due to term limits. Gjonaj won the five-way primary with 39% of the vote.

On November 8, 2017, Gjonaj won his bid to replace New York City Councilman James Vacca, defeating the Republican candidate John Cerini by a margin of 49% to 36%.

In 2020, in response to the coronavirus pandemic and the ensuing recession, Gjonaj introduced a bill to cap fees charged by delivery applications (e.g. Grubhub).

== Controversies ==
In 2017, Gjonaj confirmed that he had used over $17,000 of donor funds to sue New York City for siting homeless shelters and mental health facilities in the Bronx.

In August 2018, Gjonaj was filmed chanting "shame" at Alessandra Biaggi, who was running in a primary against incumbent State Senator Jeffrey D. Klein. Gjonaj's chief of staff said that he was angry at Biaggi's support for bike infrastructure. Biaggi won the primary.

== Election history ==
Election History
Location	Year	Election Type	Results		
Location	Year	Election Type	Candidate	Votes	Percent
NYS Assembly District 80	2012	General	√ Mark Gjonaj (D)	22,386	77.76%
NYS Assembly District 80	2012	General	Nicole J. Torres (R)	2,600	7.92%
NYS Assembly District 80	2012	General	Naomi Rivera (WFP)	2,186	6.66%
NYS Assembly District 80	2012	General	Patrick A. McManus (Cons)	861	2.62%
NYS Assembly District 80	2012	General	William Edstrom (Green)	274	0.83%
NYS Assembly District 80	2014	General	√ Mark Gjonaj (D)	9,816	77.76%
NYS Assembly District 80	2014	General	Robert Goodman (R/Cons)	1,892	14.99%
NYS Assembly District 80	2016	General	√ Mark Gjonaj (D)	24,959	70.50%
NYS Assembly District 80	2016	General	Nicholas Marricco (R)	3,391	9.58%
NYS Assembly District 80	2016	General	Robert Goodman (Cons)	953	2.69%
NYC Council District 13	2017	Democratic Primary	√ Mark Gjonaj	3,503	38.46%
NYC Council District 13	2017	Democratic Primary	Marjorie Velázquez	3,113	34.14%
NYC Council District 13	2017	Democratic Primary	John C. Doyle	1,728	18.97%
NYC Council District 13	2017	General	√ Mark Gjonaj (D)	10,602	48.62%
NYC Council District 13	2017	General	John Cerini (R/Cons/Reform)	7,791	35.73%
NYC Council District 13	2017	General	Marjorie Velázquez (WFP)	2,829	12.97%

Political offices
Preceded by James Vacca	New York City Council, 13th district 2018–2021	Succeeded by Marjorie Velázquez
Preceded by Naomi Rivera	New York Assembly, 80th District; 2013-2017	Succeeded by Nathalia Fernandez
