= Madeline Provenzano =

American politician

Madeline Provenzano (1936 – 7 December 2014) was a member of the New York City Council from the Bronx. A Democrat and former chief-of-staff to her predecessor, Councilman Michael DeMarco, Provenzano was first elected in 1997, representing District 13. She was re-elected in 2001 and again in 2003 (after Council boundaries were redrawn). In 2005, Provenzano was barred from seeking another term by New York City's term limits law (which were amended in 2009).

Political offices
Preceded by Michael DeMarco	New York City Council, 13th district 1998–2005	Succeeded by James Vacca
