= Jeffrey D. Klein =

American politician

Jeff Klein
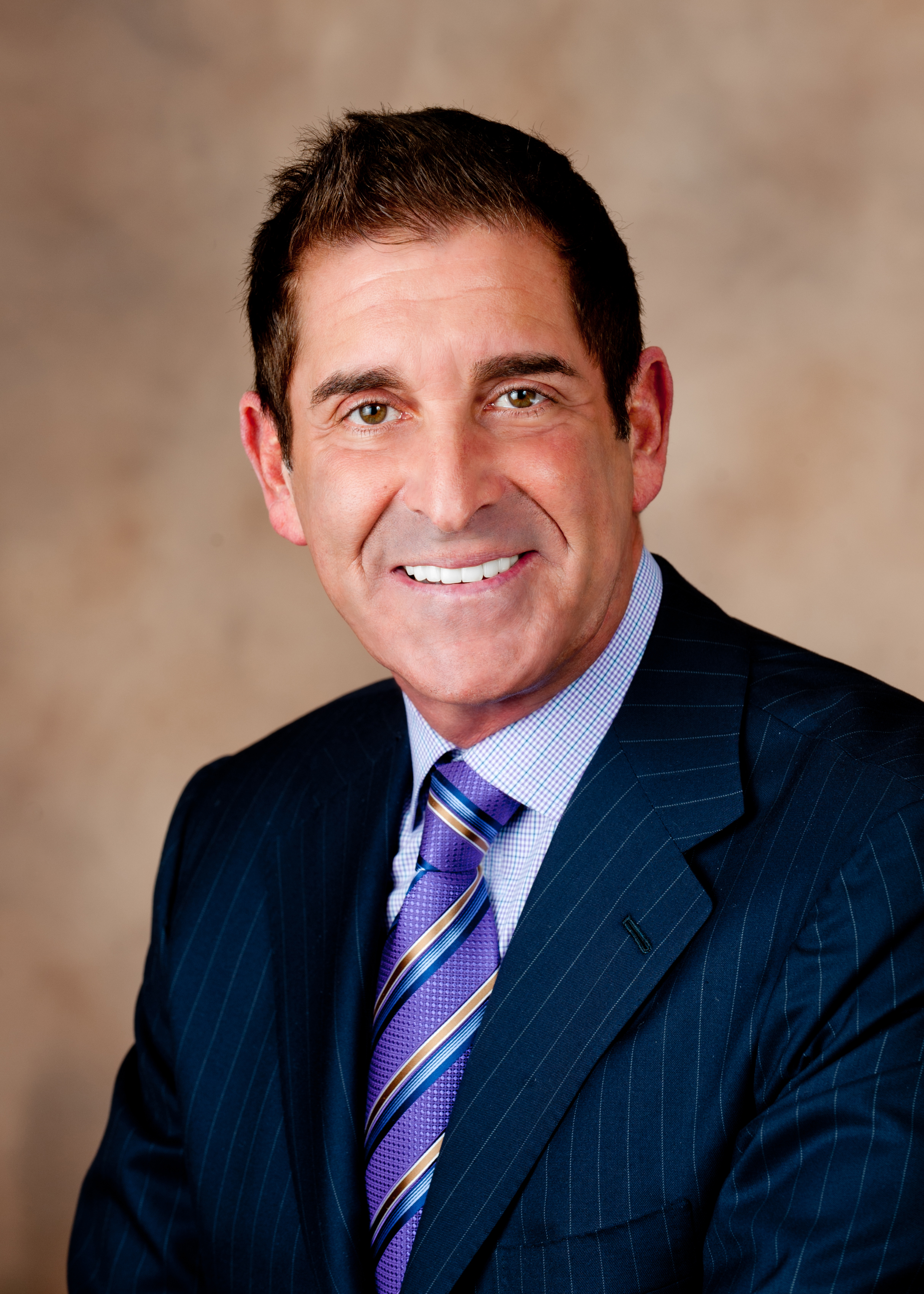

Member of the New York State Senate from the 34th district
- In office January 1, 2005 – December 31, 2018
- Preceded by: Walter J Bink III
- Succeeded by: Alessandra Biaggi

Member of the New York State Assembly from the 80th district
- In office January 1, 1995 – December 31, 2004
- Preceded by: George Friedman
- Succeeded by: Naomi Rivera

Personal details
- Born: July 10, 1960 (age 66) The Bronx, New York, U.S.
- Party: Democratic
- Other political affiliations: Independent Democratic Conference (2011–2018)
- Education: Queens College (BA); Columbia University (MPA); CUNY School of Law (JD)
- Website: Official website

Jeffrey David Klein (born July 10, 1960) is an American politician and a member of the Democratic Party. He represented the New York State Senate's 34th District, serving parts of Bronx and Westchester Counties from 2005 to 2018. Klein also served as Deputy Democratic Conference Leader.

Klein served in the New York State Assembly from 1994 until 2004, when he was elected to the New York State Senate. From January 2011 to April 2018, Klein led the Independent Democratic Conference (IDC), a group of Democratic state senators who formed a separate conference and allied themselves with Senate Republicans. Klein and his IDC colleagues rejoined the Senate Democratic Conference in April 2018.

In the September 2018 Democratic primary election, Klein was defeated by lawyer and first-time candidate Alessandra Biaggi in what amounted to a major upset for Klein and his former IDC colleagues. Klein remained on the general election ballot on a minor party line and was defeated by Biaggi again.

== Early life and education ==
A lifelong resident of the northeast Bronx, Klein is the son of Howard and Marilyn Klein. He was educated in Bronx public schools. Klein received his undergraduate degree from Queens College, an M.P.A. from Columbia University's School of International and Public Affairs, and a J.D. from the City University of New York School of Law, where he was a member of the law review.

== Career ==
A former chief of staff to Congressman James Scheuer, Klein served as a Democratic State Committeeman and District Leader before being elected to the New York State Assembly in 1994. During his ten years representing the 80th Assembly District in the state legislature, Klein served as Chairman of the Subcommittee on Crime and the Elderly, the Committee on State-Federal Relations, and the Committee on Oversight, Analysis and Investigations.

=== New York State Senate ===
In 2004, after former State Senator Guy Velella was convicted on corruption charges, Klein declined to seek reelection to the Assembly in order to run for Velella's seat in the New York Senate. In the Democratic Senate primary, Klein defeated then-Assemblyman Stephen B. Kaufman. Prior to running for the Senate, Klein was reported to be considering a race for New York Attorney General in 2006, but did not do so because Andrew Cuomo and Jeanine Pirro were competing for that position. After two years in the Senate, he abandoned plans to run for the Majority Leader position, instead opting for the Deputy Minority Leader spot.

After considering a race for New York Attorney General, Klein opted to run for re-election. In 2010, he was easily re-elected, defeating Republican Frank Vernuccio, a community activist in the Bronx.

==== Independent Democratic Conference ====
In January 2011, Klein announced that he would lead the newly formed Independent Democratic Conference (IDC), a group of breakaway New York State Senate Democrats.

Following the 2010 census, New York redistricted the Senate, expanding it from 62 to 63 seats as of January 2013. The 34th district of New York Senate where Klein was elected was gerrymandered to combine a majority white district in the Bronx with Jewish neighborhoods in Riverdale and in the East Bronx. When all election night results were tabulated on November 6, 2012, it appeared that Democrats would hold 33 seats for a three-seat majority, their third Senate majority since World War II. Yet not long after the Senate Democrats' momentous victory, on December 4, 2012, Klein and the Republican Leadership announced a power-sharing agreement between the IDC and the G.O.P. in order to govern the Senate in a bipartisan coalition. Under their power-sharing arrangement, the IDC and the Senate Republicans jointly controlled the Senate legislative calendar (determining what bills would reach the Senate floor), made assignments to Senate committees, decided appointments to government boards, and negotiated the state budget. Sens. Klein and Skelos also agreed that the title of Senate President would shift back and forth between the two of them every two weeks.

Klein was a prime sponsor of the 2013 New York Secure Ammunition and Firearms Enforcement Act (NY SAFE Act), which enacted new comprehensive gun control measures statewide in the wake of the Sandy Hook Elementary School shooting in Newtown, Connecticut, and in response to mass shootings nationwide.

Klein was the primary sponsor of the proposed "At Rest" legislation, which would require liquor sold in New York State to be stored in warehouses located in New York State. Wine retailers, New York wine producers, and smaller wine wholesalers argue that the legislation would drive up the cost of wine and spirits in New York State and significantly benefit large New York State liquor wholesalers such as Empire Merchants, which donated over $53,000 to Klein's campaign between 2009 and 2014.

Prior to the 2013 state budget negotiations, Klein publicly demanded that New York increase its minimum wage as part of a final agreement. Klein's support was seen as critical to the measure's success, which will increase New York's minimum wage to $9 per hour by the end of 2015.

Liberal activists working with the Democratic Party and the Working Families Party targeted Klein in 2014, with Oliver Koppell challenging Klein in a Democratic primary. Due to pressure from Governor Andrew Cuomo and labor unions, Klein indicated in June 2014 that the IDC would rejoin the Democratic caucus after the November 2014 elections. Klein defeated Koppell.

In the 2014 general election, Republicans won back the Senate majority. The election results meant that Klein lost his position as Senate co-leader. Though Klein had previously stated that the IDC would rejoin the Senate Democrats, the IDC decided to remain allied with the Republicans in the 2015 legislative session despite their conference's diminished role.

Klein was a partner in the law firm Klein, Calderoni & Santucci, LLP, but divested from the law practice in 2015 and continued to call for lawmakers to give up their outside income.

Klein and his IDC colleagues rejoined the Senate Democratic Conference in April 2018 at the request of Gov. Andrew Cuomo. Under the deal made between the IDC and the Senate Democratic Conference, Klein returned to his former role as Deputy Democratic Conference Leader.

==== Sexual harassment allegation ====
In January 2018, Klein was accused by a female former staffer of forcibly kissing her in 2015. Klein denied the accusation. Despite the allegations, Klein took part in high-level negotiations regarding sexual harassment legislation in 2018. The New York Joint Commission on Public Ethics (JCOPE) opened an investigation into the allegation, though by the time it went to an administrative hearing, Klein was no longer in the State Senate, having lost his campaign for reelection.

Klein later petitioned to shut down the investigation, pointing to findings by the assigned hearing officer that encouraged the commission to drop the investigation in June 2020. The findings concluded that the Public Officers Law under which Klein was charged did not apply because the alleged incident appeared to be isolated and did not affect government decision-making. In August 2020, the JCOPE voted 9–2 to proceed with the investigative hearing. Klein's lawyers attempted to have the lawsuit dismissed in January 2021. In March 2023, Klein failed to have the legislative investigation into the allegations closed by investigators. The Appellate Division Third Department in Albany ruled against dismissal on March 9, 2023. Klein did not appeal the ruling. He originally requested the investigation into the accusations against himself while he was still a New York State Senator.

In November 2025, the Commission on Ethics and Lobbying In Government (COELIG) closed its case against Klein in regard to the sexual harassment allegation.

==== 2018 loss to Biaggi ====
Lawyer and first-time candidate Alessandra Biaggi, 32 years old, challenged Klein, who had held the seat for 14 years, in the 2018 Democratic Primary election. Klein outspent Biaggi by a rate of 9-to-1, spending $2 million to her $200,000. Biaggi defeated Klein in the primary in a major upset, 54%-46%. His upset loss was attributed by some to anger with the former members of the Independent Democratic Conference.

As New York's electoral fusion laws allow candidates to appear on multiple ballot lines in an election, Klein still appeared in the November 6, 2018, general election on the third-party Independence Party of New York ballot line. Biaggi defeated Klein again in the general election.

=== Lobbyist ===
After leaving the state Senate, Klein became a lobbyist for Mercury Public Affairs, based in New York City. He created his own lobbying firm called Allied Government Affairs and is the president of the firm as of August 2026.

== Personal life ==
As of February 2018, Klein was romantically involved with Diane Savino, a fellow Democratic State Senator. Klein and Savino had been dating since 2008. Like Klein, Savino is a former member of the IDC.

== See also ==
- New York State Senate
- List of New York state senators
- 2009 New York State Senate leadership crisis

New York State Assembly
Preceded by George Friedman	New York State Assembly, 80th district 1995–2004	Succeeded by Naomi Rivera
New York State Senate
Preceded by Guy Velella	New York State Senate, 34th district 2005–2019	Succeeded by Alessandra Biaggi
Preceded by Thomas W. Libous	Deputy Majority Leader of the New York State Senate; 2009–2010	Succeeded by Thomas W. Libous
Vacant Committee dormant	Chairman of the Alcohol and Substance Abuse Committee; 2011–2012	Succeeded by Phil Boyle
