= Alessandra Biaggi =

American politician (born 1986)

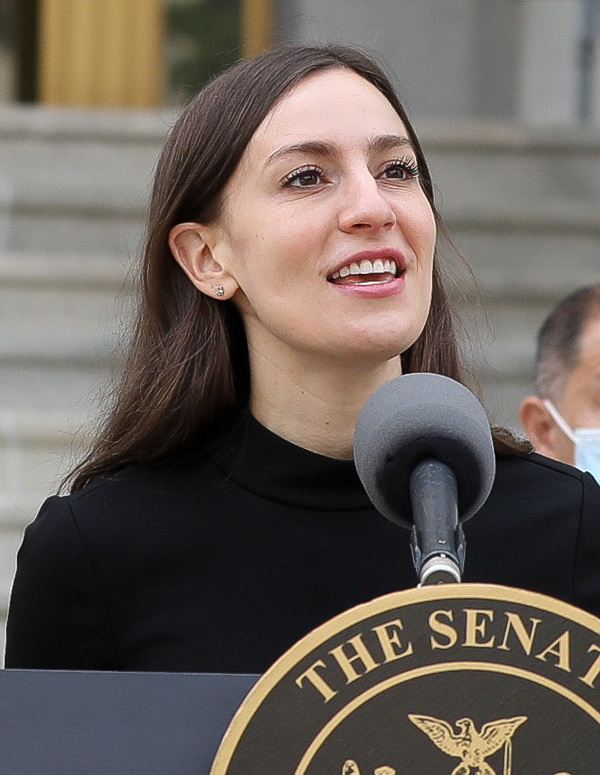

Member of the New York Senate from the 34th district
- In office January 1, 2019 – December 31, 2022
- Preceded by: Jeff Klein
- Succeeded by: Nathalia Fernandez

Personal details
- Born: Alessandra Rose Biaggi; May 20, 1986 (age 40) Mount Vernon, New York, U.S.
- Party: Democratic
- Spouse: Nathaniel Koloc (m. 2019)
- Relatives: Mario Biaggi (grandfather)
- Education: New York University (BA); Fordham University (JD); Harvard University (MRPL)
- Website: Campaign website

Alessandra Rose Biaggi (born May 20, 1986) is an American politician from the state of New York. A progressive Democrat, Biaggi served as a member of the New York State Senate from 2019 to 2022, where she represented New York's 34th State Senate district.

Biaggi was first elected to the State Senate in 2018 after she upset longtime Senator Jeffrey D. Klein in a Democratic primary. She chaired the New York State Senate Committee on Ethics and Internal Governance. Biaggi is notable for her advocacy for survivors of sexual misconduct.

In 2022, Biaggi ran for Congress in New York's 17th congressional district. She was defeated by incumbent Rep. Sean Patrick Maloney in the Democratic primary. Biaggi is the granddaughter of former U.S. Congressman Mario Biaggi.

== Early life and education ==
Biaggi was born in Mount Vernon, New York, and is Italian-American. Her great-grandparents had immigrated to the United States from Italy, and she is the fourth generation of her family to live in her district. Biaggi's grandfather, Mario Biaggi, served as a Democratic member of the U.S. House of Representatives from New York from 1969 to 1988. She grew up first in Fort Lee, New Jersey, and when she was eight years old she moved with her family to Pelham, New York. When she was a child, she was sexually abused for over a year.

Biaggi graduated from Pelham Memorial High School ('04), where she was a cheerleader. In 2008, she graduated from New York University's Steinhardt School of Culture, Education, and Human Development with a Bachelor of Arts degree in communications. Biaggi then attended St. John's University School of Law. She subsequently graduated from Fordham Law School in 2012; while there, she was a member of the Fordham Law Review. She was the first woman from her family to graduate from law school. In 2014, Biaggi attended the Women's Campaign School at Yale University.

== Career ==
=== Early years ===
Biaggi interned in the office of U.S. Congressman Joseph Crowley after college, and while in law school with the Brooklyn District Attorney Rackets Bureau and the U.S. Attorney's Office for the Southern District of New York Public Corruption and Appellate Bureaus. She then worked from 2014 to 2015 at her first job as a lawyer, as Assistant General Counsel for New York State Governor Andrew Cuomo’s Office of Storm Recovery.

From May 2015 to December 2016, during the campaign for the 2016 U.S. presidential election, Biaggi served as Deputy National Operations Director for the Hillary Clinton 2016 presidential campaign. She oversaw a staff of 200 and a budget of $500 million. She said: "Everything was urgent in the moment. It was total chaos and I loved it. We played very hard, and it was very hard to lose."

For a seven-month period in 2017, Biaggi worked in the executive chamber under Governor Andrew Cuomo.

=== New York State Senate (2019–2022) ===
==== Campaigns ====
"I'm not going to wait for somebody to anoint me or choose me. I have got to step up."

— Biaggi

A progressive Democrat, Biaggi ran in 2018 in the Democratic State Senate primary in District 34. She ran against powerful longtime incumbent Jeffrey D. Klein, the number two Democrat in the NY Senate and the leader of the Independent Democratic Conference. Klein had held the seat for 14 years. Klein outspent Biaggi by a rate of 9-to-1, spending $2.7 million to her $333,000. Biaggi said: "The more people told me I couldn’t win, the more obsessed I became."

In a major upset, Biaggi defeated Klein in the primary, 54%-46%. She remarked: "It was a tough fight. And, I should also say, we should thank [Senator Klein] for his service. But his time is up." Biaggi's victory was attributed by some to anger with the former members of the Independent Democratic Conference.

As New York's electoral fusion laws allow candidates to appear on multiple ballot lines in an election, Klein still appeared in the November 6, 2018, general election on the third-party Independence Party of New York ballot line. On November 6, 2018, Biaggi defeated Klein and Republican Richard Ribustello and was elected to the New York State Senate. At 32 years of age, she became one of the youngest women ever elected to the New York State Senate.

In 2020, Biaggi was re-elected to the Senate with 74% of the vote.

==== Tenure ====
Biaggi served as chair of the Senate Committee on Ethics and Internal Governance.

Combating sexual abuse was one of Biaggi's policy issues. She led the first public hearings in the New York State Senate on workplace sexual harassment in 27 years, and fought for tougher sexual harassment laws. Susan Kang, Associate Professor of political science at John Jay College of Criminal Justice, said: "She is definitely making a name for herself as someone who is an advocate for victims of sexual violence."

In June 2019, the New York legislature passed sweeping anti-sexual-harassment legislation that Biaggi had sponsored. Among other things, the bills reduced employers' ability to avoid liability for their employees' behavior, provided for attorney fees and punitive damages, and lengthened the time frame within which to file complaints. In her first six months in office, Biaggi introduced 80 bills, 17 of which were passed.

In February 2021, Biaggi wrote on Twitter: "@NYGovCuomo, you are a monster, and it is time for you to go. Now." At the time, her call for his resignation was what The New York Times described as: "something of an outlier in the Democrat-controlled Legislature." On August 10, 2021, Governor Andrew Cuomo announced his resignation.

In May 2021 journalist Matthew Kassel opined: "Biaggi ... has gained a reputation, on her own merits, as an upstate force — an influential lawmaker with a growing list of legislative accomplishments who has carved out a space for herself as an outspoken and independent voice in Albany’s cutthroat political sphere."

On September 24, 2021, Biaggi co-wrote a letter to US Senator Maria Cantwell with eight other New York State Senators, requesting that the US Senate Committee on Commerce, Science, and Transportation engage in oversight of the United States Center for SafeSport, and step in to ensure that SafeSport is adequately conducting investigations. They referred to what they called SafeSport's failure to carry out impartial and thorough investigations, and ensure the safety of athletes it is charged with protecting. They highlighted the fact that despite serious outstanding allegations of sexual misconduct, sexual coercion, and other violent behaviors by former friends, peers, and current teammates, and an ongoing investigation, fencer Alen Hadzic was allowed to travel to Tokyo as an alternate for the 2021 Team USA Olympic fencing team.

Biaggi was a vocal advocate for defunding the police.

In 2022, Biaggi received criticism over her treatment of her staff.

=== 2022 congressional campaign ===
In February 2022, Biaggi announced her candidacy for New York's 3rd congressional district after incumbent Democratic Rep. Thomas Suozzi announced his candidacy for governor of New York. After court-ordered redistricting removed Westchester County and the Bronx from the 3rd congressional district, Biaggi ended her candidacy there.

On June 7, 2022, Biaggi announced that she would be running for New York's 17th congressional district in a primary challenge against DCCC chair Sean Patrick Maloney. Upon her announcement, she was endorsed by Alexandria Ocasio-Cortez. On August 23, 2022, Biaggi lost to Maloney in the primary election.

== Recognition ==
In 2019, Crain's New York Business named Biaggi to its annual "40 Under 40" list.

In June 2021, she was named to the Hunter College New York City Food Policy Center annual 40 Under 40: The Rising Stars in NYC Food Policy. She was noted for working "to transform and improve the food system." In November 2021, Biaggi was named to the City & State New York "Women 100", as one of the prominent women wielding power in New York State. She was noted especially for having long pushed for legislation addressing sexual assault and sexual abuse.

== Personal life ==
On July 22, 2019, in Tarrytown, New York, Biaggi married Nathaniel Koloc. He is a management consultant whom she met in 2015, and who also worked on the Hillary Clinton 2016 presidential campaign.

In 2025, Biaggi obtained a master of religion and public life degree at Harvard Divinity School.

== See also ==
- List of New York state senators

New York State Senate
Preceded by Jeffrey D. Klein	New York State Senate, 34th District; 2019–2022	Succeeded by Nathalia Fernandez
