= 2024 New York state elections =

- November 5, 2024

Elections were held in the State of New York on November 5, 2024. On this date, the state held elections for the following offices: all 26 seats in the U.S. House of Representatives, all 63 seats in the New York State Senate and all 150 seats in the New York State Assembly. The 2024 United States presidential election and the 2024 election for U.S. Senate occurred on the same date as the general election. In addition, one ballot measure was on the ballot.

== Federal offices ==
=== President of the United States ===
Democratic incumbent vice president Kamala Harris ran against Republican former president Donald Trump. New York has 28 electoral votes in the Electoral College.

=== U.S. Senate ===
Incumbent Democratic senator Kirsten Gillibrand ran for a third term against Republican Michael D. Sapraicone and LaRouche candidate Diane Sare. She was elected with 67% of the vote in 2018.

=== U.S. House of Representatives ===
New York has twenty-six congressional districts that elect twenty-six members of the U.S. House of Representatives. Since the 2022 elections, most representatives have been Democratic.

== State offices ==
=== State Senate ===
All 63 seats of the New York State Senate were up for election. Democrats have retained a majority control of the Senate since 2018.

=== State Assembly ===
All 150 seats of the New York State Assembly were up for election. Democrats have retained a majority control of the assembly since 1975.

== Ballot measures ==
- Equal Protection of Law Amendment: amended the Equal Protection Clause of the state constitution to ensure equality under the law regardless of "ethnicity, national origin, age, disability", and "sex, including sexual orientation, gender identity, gender expression, pregnancy, pregnancy outcomes, and reproductive healthcare and autonomy". The previous text text, drafted in 1938, only protected "race, color, creed, or religion".
