= New York's 34th State Senate district =

American legislative district

Senator
Nathalia Fernandez; D–Morris Park
- Registration: 65.8% Democratic; 12.5% Republican; 17.6% No party preference
- Demographics: 35% White; 14% Black; 43% Hispanic; 7% Asian
- Population (2017): 328,268
- Registered voters: 194,537

New York's 34th State Senate district is one of 63 districts in the New York State Senate. It has been represented by Democrat Nathalia Fernandez since 2023, succeeding Alessandra Biaggi.

== Geography ==
District 34 includes parts of the Bronx and southern Westchester County.

The district overlaps with New York's 13th, 14th, 15th, and 16th congressional districts, and with the 78th, 80th, 81st, 82nd, 84th, 85th, 87th, 88th, and 89th districts of the New York State Assembly.

== Recent election results ==
=== 2026 ===
2026 New York State Senate election, District 34
Party	Candidate	Votes	%
Democratic	Nathalia Fernandez		
Working Families	Nathalia Fernandez		
Total	Nathalia Fernandez (incumbent)		
Conservative	Adrian Romero		
Write-in			
Total votes			100.0

=== 2024 ===
2024 New York State Senate election, District 34
Party	Candidate	Votes	%
Democratic	Nathalia Fernandez (incumbent)	58,327	67.5
Republican	Edwinna Herrera	25,395	
Conservative	Edwinna Herrera	2,513	
Total	Edwinna Herrera	27,908	32.3
Write-in		208	0.2
Total votes		86,443	100.0
Democratic hold			

=== 2022 ===
2022 New York State Senate election, District 34
Primary election
Party	Candidate	Votes	%
Democratic	Nathalia Fernandez	5,791	62.6
Democratic	Christian Amato	2,673	28.9
Democratic	John Perez	706	7.6
Write-in		87	0.9
Total votes		9,257	100.0
General election
Democratic	Nathalia Fernandez	34,378	65.2
Republican	Samantha Zherka	17,101	
Conservative	Samantha Zherka	1,234	
Total	Samantha Zherka	18,335	34.8
Write-in		18	0.0
Total votes		52,731	100.0
Democratic hold			

=== 2020 ===
2020 New York State Senate election, District 34
Primary election
Party	Candidate	Votes	%
Democratic	Alessandra Biaggi (incumbent)	28,665	87.6
Democratic	James Gisondi	3,941	12.1
Write-in		108	0.3
Total votes		32,714	100.0
General election
Democratic	Alessandra Biaggi	76,131	
Working Families	Alessandra Biaggi	7,600	
Total	Alessandra Biaggi (incumbent)	83,731	73.9
Republican	James Gisondi	25,634	22.6
Conservative	Antonio Vitiello	3,829	3.4
Write-in		114	0.1
Total votes		113,308	100.0
Democratic hold			

=== 2018 ===
2018 New York State Senate election, District 34
Primary election
Party	Candidate	Votes	%
Democratic	Alessandra Biaggi	19,318	54.3
Democratic	Jeffrey Klein (incumbent)	16,290	45.7
Write-in		0	0.0
Total votes		35,608	100.0
General election
Democratic	Alessandra Biaggi	58,112	
Working Families	Alessandra Biaggi	2,470	
Total	Alessandra Biaggi	60,582	76.0
Republican	Richard Ribustello	11,875	14.9
Independence	Jeffrey Klein (incumbent)	5,736	7.2
Conservative	Antonio Vitiello	1,430	1.8
Write-in		42	0.1
Total votes		79,665	100.0
Democratic hold			

=== 2016 ===
2016 New York State Senate election, District 34
Party	Candidate	Votes	%
Democratic	Jeffrey Klein	76,099	
Women's Equality	Jeffrey Klein	2,695	
Independence	Jeffrey Klein	2,204	
Total	Jeffrey Klein (incumbent)	80,998	90.1
Conservative	Aleksander Mici	6,080	6.8
Green	Carl Lundgren	2,686	3.0
Write-in		110	0.1
Total votes		89,874	100.0
Democratic hold			

=== 2014 ===
2014 New York State Senate election, District 34
Primary election
Party	Candidate	Votes	%
Democratic	Jeffrey Klein (incumbent)	9,211	64.8
Democratic	G. Oliver Koppell	5,008	35.2
Write-in		0	0.0
Total votes		14,219	100.0
General election
Democratic	Jeffrey Klein	29,344	
Women's Equality	Jeffrey Klein	1,440	
Independence	Jeffrey Klein	511	
Total	Jeffrey Klein (incumbent)	31,295	76.2
Republican	Aleksander Mici	6,103	14.9
Conservative	Frank Dellavelle	1,957	4.8
Green	Carl Lundgren	1,638	4.0
Write-in		70	0.1
Total votes		41,063	100.0
Democratic hold			

=== 2012 ===
2012 New York State Senate election, District 34
Party	Candidate	Votes	%
Democratic	Jeffrey Klein	62,168	
Republican	Jeffrey Klein	15,360	
Working Families	Jeffrey Klein	2,099	
Independence	Jeffrey Klein	795	
Total	Jeffrey Klein (incumbent)	80,422	93.8
Conservative	Elizabeth Perri	3,940	4.6
Green	Carl Lundgren	1,348	1.6
Write-in		44	0.0
Total votes		85,754	100.0
Democratic hold			

=== Federal results in District 34 ===
Year	Office	Results
2020	President	Biden 71.6 – 27.1%
2016	President	Clinton 73.5 – 23.9%
2012	President	Obama 74.3 – 24.8%
2012	Senate	Gillibrand 80.7 – 18.0%
