= Marjorie Velázquez =

American politician (born 1981)

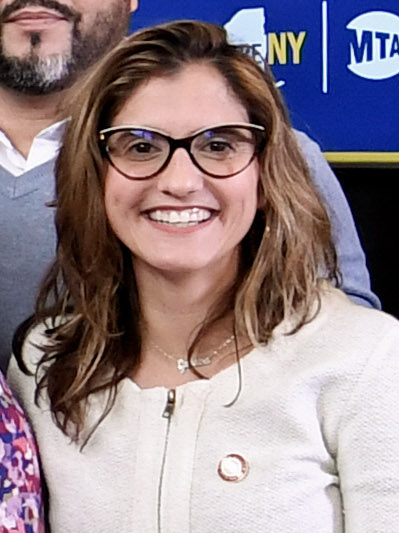

Member of the New York City Council from the 13th district
- In office January 1, 2022 – December 31, 2023
- Preceded by: Mark Gjonaj
- Succeeded by: Kristy Marmorato

Personal details
- Born: August 11, 1981 (age 45) New York City, New York, U.S.
- Party: Democratic
- Education: New York University (BA)
- Website: Campaign website

Marjorie Velázquez (born August 11, 1981) is an American politician from New York City. A Democrat, Velázquez served as a member of the New York City Council representing the 13th district, which covers parts of the eastern Bronx. Velázquez was defeated for re-election by Kristy Marmorato in the 2023 election.

== Early life ==
Velázquez was born in the Bronx to Puerto Rican parents who had moved to New York City in the 1970s. She graduated from St. Catharine Academy and received her B.A. in finance and accounting from the New York University Stern School of Business.

== Political career ==
=== Pre-Council career ===
After working for several years in accounting and corporate finance, Velázquez suffered serious injuries after multiple accidents in 2012. She joined Bronx Community Board 10 and was elected as a Democratic District Leader for the 82nd Assembly district, a position she still holds.

=== 2017 City Council campaign ===
In 2017, Velázquez ran to succeed term-limited Democrat James Vacca in the 13th district of the New York City Council. With support from Vacca and The New York Times, among others, Velázquez was seen as one of the race's frontrunners.

Velázquez's main opponent in the Democratic primary was Assemblyman Mark Gjonaj, who ran to Velázquez's right and spent over $700,000, a record for a City Council campaign. Velázquez lost the primary by a 38-34% margin, with three other candidates taking the remainder. Soon after, Velázquez indicated she would be back, saying, "Would I ever run again? Most definitely."

=== 2021 City Council campaign ===
Velázquez announced in 2020 that she would seek a 2021 rematch with Gjonaj, citing the repeated scandals Gjonaj found himself combating during his first term. In February 2021, however, Gjonaj announced he would not seek re-election, saying that the political climate was "not favorable to a centrist ideology that my constituency, community and I embrace."

Now running for an open seat, Velázquez would go on to win the five-way Democratic primary in June 2021. She won the subsequent November 2021 general election with a near-identical 56.3% of the vote and took office in January 2022.

=== City Council ===
In 2022, Velázquez protested against turning an unused building on Jacobi Medical Center’s campus into housing for ex-convicts with complex medical needs (such as Stage 4 cancer or congestive heart failure). That same year, she also opposed the construction of 349 housing units (168 of which were affordable housing) in Throggs Neck. She later changed her view, supporting the Throggs Neck development.

Velasquez supported the development of a casino at Ferry Point Park. The State of New York needs to approve the application for construction of the casino before further action is taken. Bally's Corporation will take over the Trump Golf Links property through 2035, having acquired the Trump Organization’s 20-year lease from the New York City Parks Department that began in 2015. Many residents of the council district are against having a casino exist in the Bronx.

== Personal life ==
Velázquez lives in the Bronx, and currently in the middle of divorce proceedings with her estranged husband, Jeff Lynch.
