= Nathalia Fernandez =

American politician (born 1988)

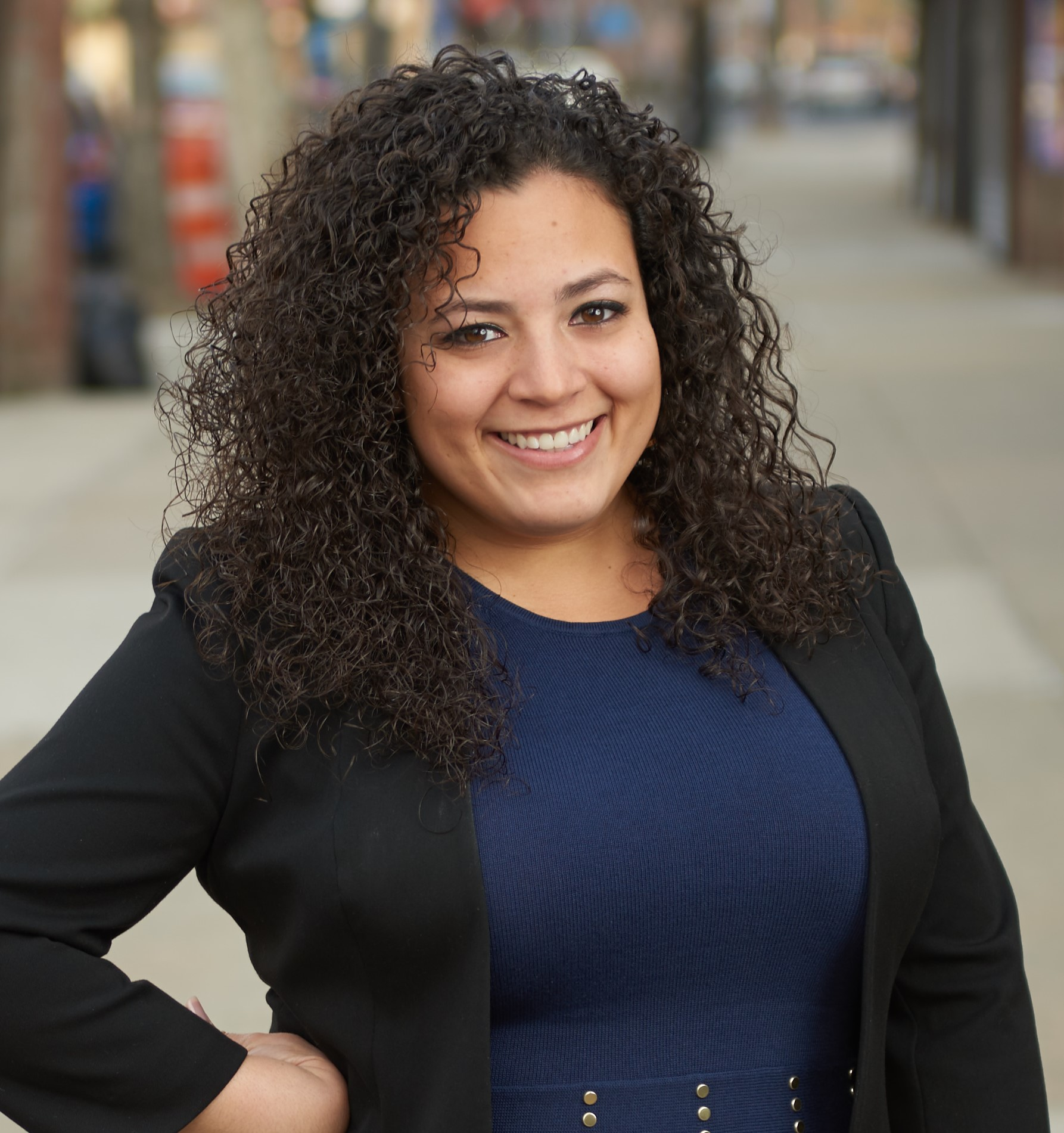

Member of the New York State Senate from the 34th district
- Incumbent
- Assumed office January 1, 2023
- Preceded by: Alessandra Biaggi

Member of the New York State Assembly from the 80th district
- In office January 3, 2019 – December 31, 2022
- Preceded by: Mark Gjonaj
- Succeeded by: John Zaccaro Jr.

Personal details
- Born: May 6, 1988 (age 38)
- Party: Democratic
- Education: Hofstra University (BA)
- Website: Campaign website State Senate website

Nathalia Fernandez (born May 6, 1988) is an American politician serving as a Democratic member of the New York State Senate representing the 34th Senate district.

== Early life ==
Fernandez was born to parents William and Sonia. Her father immigrated to the United States from Cuba and her mother immigrated from Colombia. She grew up in Rockland County and later Westchester County, where she graduated from North Salem High School. Fernandez attended Hofstra University.

== Political career ==
In 2012, Fernandez volunteered for Mark Gjonaj's campaign for New York State Assembly. After Gjonaj won, Fernandez joined his staff as executive coordinator. She later rose to be Gjonaj's Chief of Staff.

In 2017, Fernandez joined the staff of New York Governor Andrew Cuomo as the representative of his office to the Bronx.

Following the election of Mark Gjonaj to the New York City Council, the 80th New York State Assembly district was left vacant and a special election was held on April 24, 2018. Fernandez ran on the Democratic and Independence party lines against Gene DeFrancis, who ran on the Republican, Conservative, and Reform party lines.

In late 2018, Fernandez ran for a full term in the Assembly. She was unopposed for the democratic nomination. Fernandez ran on the Democratic party line against Louis Perri, who ran on the Republican and Conservative lines. Fernandez won over 81% of the vote.

In August 2022, Fernandez won the primary for New York's 34th State Senate district. She went on to win the district in the general election and began serving in January 2023. She is the sponsor of Senate Bill S6142 (the OMNY Privacy Act), which, if passed, would prohibit "the disclosure of individualized fare payment data by the metropolitan commuter transportation authority and the New York city transit authority."
