= Martin Connor =

American politician

Member of the New York State Senate from the 25th district
- In office February 14, 1978 – December 31, 2008
- Preceded by: Carol Bellamy
- Succeeded by: Dan Squadron

Minority Leader of the New York State Senate
- In office January 1, 1995 – December 31, 2002
- Preceded by: Manfred Ohrenstein
- Succeeded by: David Paterson

Personal details
- Born: Martin Edward Connor; March 3, 1945 (age 81) Trenton, New Jersey, U.S.
- Party: Democratic
- Spouse: Christine Silber
- Education: Catholic University of America

Martin Edward Connor (born March 3, 1945) is a former member of the New York State Senate from Brooklyn, New York. He was first elected to the State Senate in a special election in 1978. He is a Democrat. The 25th Senate District that he represented covers lower Manhattan and an area of Brooklyn down the East River from part of Greenpoint to Carroll Gardens, and eastward to part of Downtown Brooklyn. He lost the 2008 Democratic primary to challenger Dan Squadron.

== Education and early career ==
Born in Trenton, New Jersey, Connor attended parochial schools as a child, graduating first in his class from Notre Dame High School in Lawrenceville. He earned a B.A. in politics from the Catholic University of America and a law degree from the Catholic University of America School of Law, where he served as an editor of the Catholic University Law Review.

While still a student, Connor worked part-time for the general Counsel of the National Labor Relations Board. Later, he served as a clerk to the in-house counsel of the International Brotherhood of Teamsters. As a lawyer, Connor practiced corporate and anti-trust law for White & Case, a large Wall Street law firm, as well as the Xerox Corporation. He briefly maintained a private law practice in Brooklyn, but was appointed Assistant Counsel to New York State Comptroller Arthur Leavitt. He resigned that position upon his election to the Senate.

== Senate career ==
He was a member of the New York State Senate from 1978 to 2008, sitting in the 182nd, 183rd, 184th, 185th, 186th, 187th, 188th, 189th, 190th, 191st, 192nd, 193rd, 194th, 195th, 196th and 197th New York State Legislatures. After 30 years in office, Connor was the New York State Senate's longest-serving Democrat. In his time in Albany, he accumulated an extensive legislative track record on a wide range of issues. He sponsored more than 100 laws.

=== Government Reform ===
In his time in office, Connor advocated for progressive causes such as reform of the legislative process to open Albany to public scrutiny . He claimed to have observed a voluntary ban on accepting gifts and meals from lobbyists and to have supported a recent law making such a ban mandatory for all legislators . He also supported limiting PAC and corporate campaign contributions to reduce the influence of special interest money in campaigns, as well as spending caps on state level campaigns to provide a level political playing field.

=== Education ===
Connor supported the creation of a state college tuition savings program and tuition tax credit . He was also an advocate of changing the state public school aid formula , as well as better pay for teachers and smaller class sizes . In 2007, he participated in negotiating an agreement to build the City's first ever green school in Battery Park City .

=== Environment ===
In addition to his contribution to the construction of New York's first green school (cited above), Mr. Connor supported increased use of alternative fuel technology, cleanup of contaminated industrial sites, and funding for open space preservation . According to EPL Environmental Advocates, Mr. Connor had the highest environmental rating in the Senate in 2007 .

=== Civil and Human Rights ===
Connor supports the right of women to choice in reproductive matters . He s supported non-discrimination on account of sexual orientation as well as equal legal rights for the LGBT community . He is an opponent of the death penalty but supported proposals to toughen gun laws and increase penalties for hate crimes .

== Senate Leadership ==
Connor served for eight years as minority leader of the Senate until he was defeated for the position in 2002 by Sen. David Paterson, who went on to become Governor of New York.

== 2006 Campaign ==
In 2006, Senator Connor was opposed in the Democratic primary by Ken Diamondstone, a developer of affordable housing ; it was the most serious race the 25th District had seen in years. A key issue in the campaign was Diamondstone's opposition to Brooklyn Bridge Park, a project that Senator Connor supported . Senator Connor won the race with more than 55% of the vote .

== Comptroller Candidacy ==
In early 2007 he was among at least 18 candidates for New York State Comptroller, in a special contest decided by the State Legislature . Assemblyman Thomas DiNapoli won the race.

== 2008 Campaign ==
In 2008, Senator Connor was opposed in the Democratic primary by Dan Squadron, a former aide to US Senator Chuck Schumer. Connor had been endorsed by Brooklyn Borough President Marty Markowitz, and a number of his fellow state senators and members of Congress . Squadron had been endorsed by Schumer, Mayor Michael Bloomberg, Congressman Anthony Weiner, Manhattan Borough President Scott Stringer, the New York Times and the Working Families Party.

A debate, sponsored by the Citizens Union, occurred on Sept. 3. Following the debate, the Citizens Union announced that it had decided to prefer the incumbent, Connor, over his challenger, stating that Connor "would undeniably be in a stronger and more experienced position to effectively advance critical reforms."

Connor lost the 2008 primary to challenger Dan Squadron, who received approximately 54% of the vote.

== Post-senatorial career ==
A longtime election lawyer by trade, Connor began to practice election law full time after leaving the senate. He is considered one of the "top" attorneys in this field, and has represented candidates at every level of government, from local, state, and congressional races, to presidential campaigns.

== See also ==
- Jeffrey Pearlman

New York State Senate
Preceded by Carol Bellamy	New York State Senate; 25th District; 1978–2008	Succeeded by Daniel Squadron
Preceded by Manfred Ohrenstein	Minority Leader in the New York State Senate; 1995–2002	Succeeded by David Paterson
