= Squadron, Ellenoff, Plesent & Sheinfeld =

Squadron, Ellenoff, Plesent & Sheinfeld was a New York City–based law firm that practiced from 1970 to 2002 when it merged with Washington, D.C.–based Hogan & Hartson, when the Squadron Ellenoff name was discontinued.

It was a prominent mid-sized firm in New York City founded by well-known Jewish lawyers and civic leaders, Howard Squadron, a litigator, Stanley Plesent, and Theodore Ellenoff, a corporate attorney and alumnus of Shea & Gould. At its height, Squadron Ellenoff employed nearly 200 attorneys with offices on New York City's Fifth Avenue and in Los Angeles. The firm was particularly known for its First Amendment practice and its work for media clients in its Los Angeles office.

In 2002, several lawyers joined White & Case, a majority of whose partners were recruited into Linklaters in 2004.

== Partners ==
Howard Squadron, a Columbia Law School graduate, was president of the American Jewish Congress from 1978 to 1984 and from 1980 to 1982, president of the Conference of Presidents of Major American Jewish Organizations. Ellenoff was an active member of the American Jewish Committee and served as its president in 1984. He graduated from Harvard Law School. Stanley Plesent, a graduate of Columbia Law school, served as General Counsel to the United States Information Agency during the Kennedy Administration

== In the media ==
Squadron Ellenoff achieved national notoriety in late 1980s with the Wedtech scandal in which a firm client, defense contractor the Wedtech Corporation and many of its officers, were indicted for securities fraud, racketeering and influence peddling when it was discovered that the company was not in fact minority-owned as it had consistently claimed in order to qualify for no-bid contracts with the Department of Defense under a Small Business Administration program. Squadron Ellenoff attorneys were called as witnesses and named partner Howard Squadron claimed to have only "vague" knowledge of the scheme to conceal Wedtech's true (non-minority) owners. Another attorney admitted being aware of the plan in which the Puerto Rican executive would purchase the shares of the company to then default on the payments, leaving control in the hands of non-minority executives, though senior partners at Squadron Ellenoff claimed to have no knowledge of this plan.

The firm is also known to have advised Rupert Murdoch on his many media acquisitions that would form the empire known as News Corp, including the New York Post.

== Merger ==
Upon merging with Hogan & Hartson in 2001, several lawyers of Squadron Ellenoff's litigation department were faced with a conflict of interest that would have precluded them from representing their clients from within the Hogan & Hartson partnership. They left and joined White & Case.
