= List of Kamala Harris 2024 presidential campaign sub-national officials endorsements =

This is a list of notable sub-national officials who endorsed the Kamala Harris 2024 presidential campaign.

== Statewide officials ==
=== Governors ===
==== Current ====
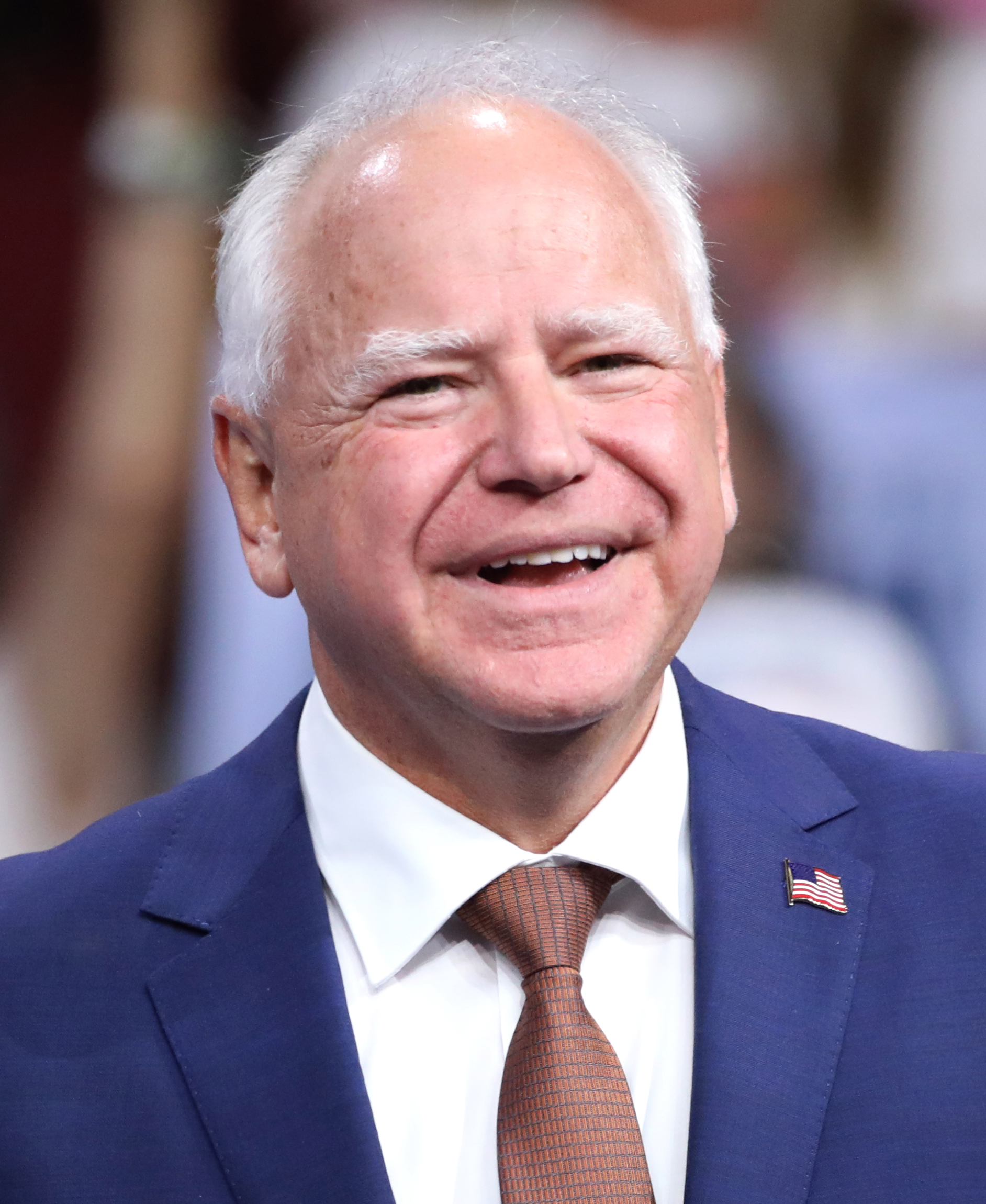
Tim Walz

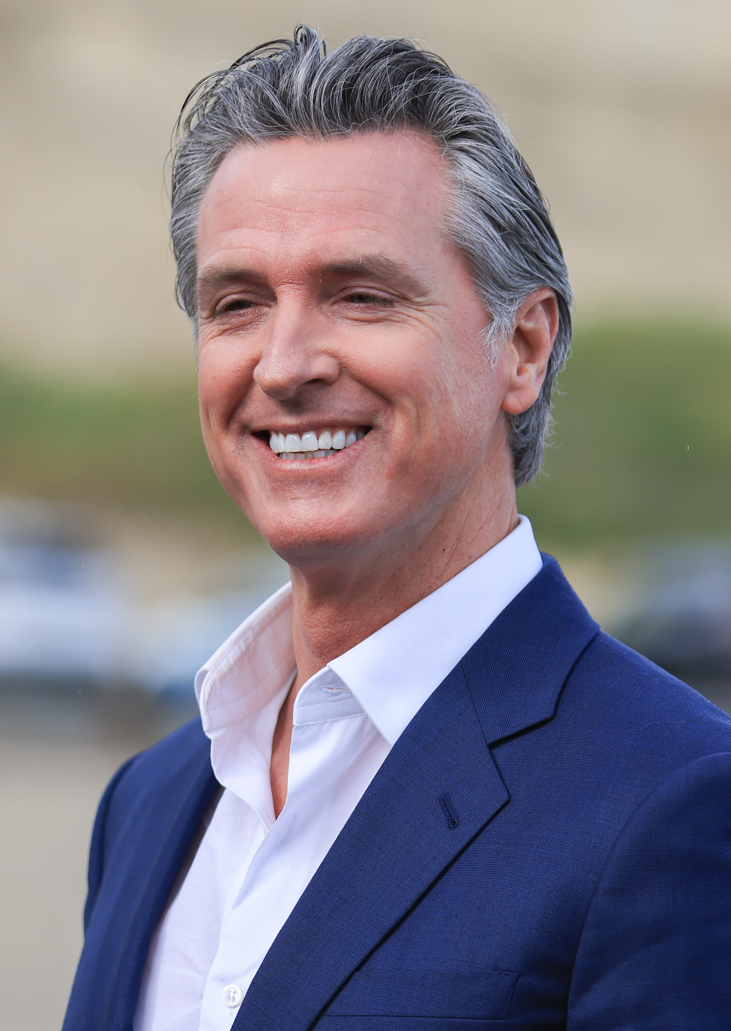
Gavin Newsom

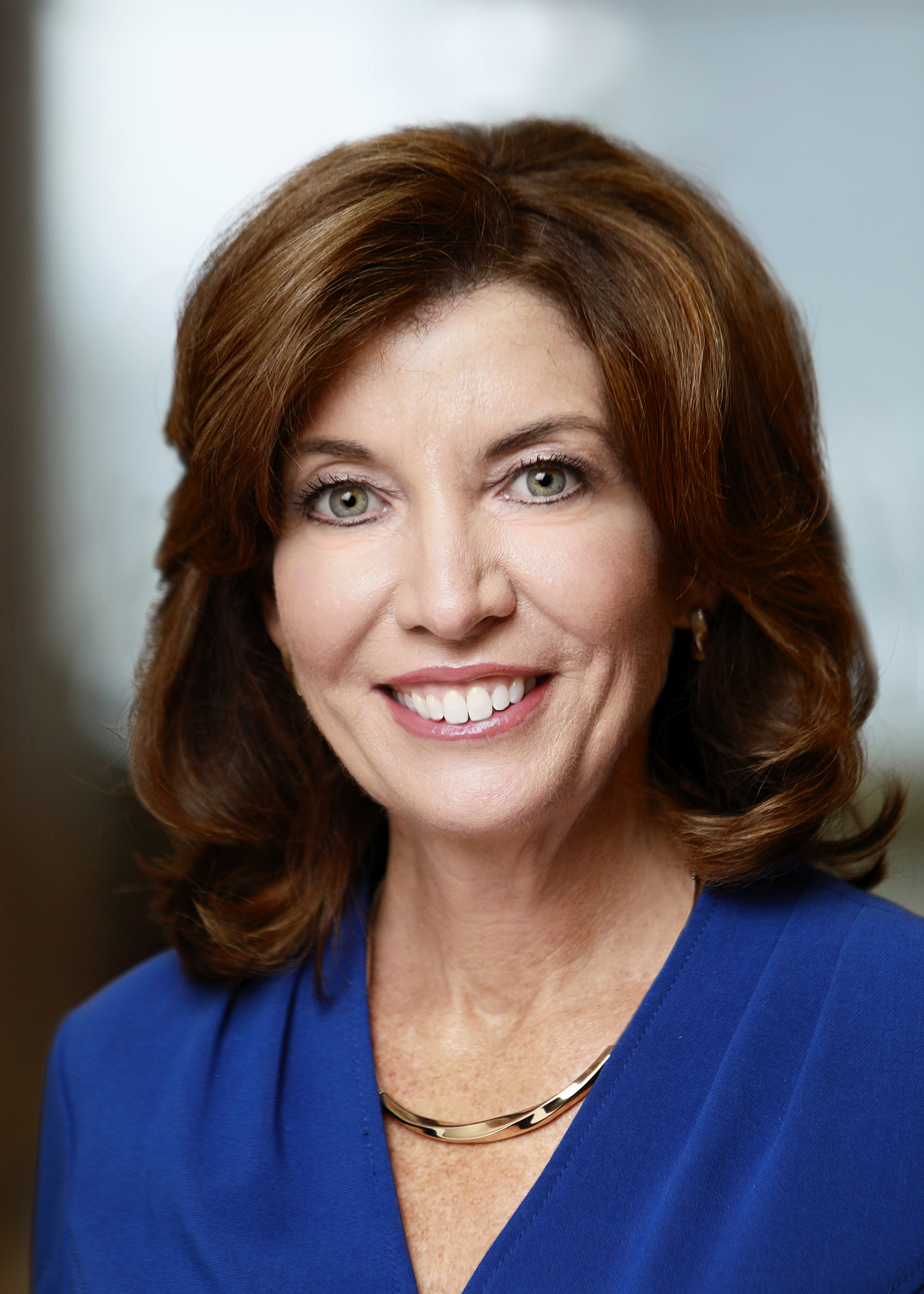
Kathy Hochul

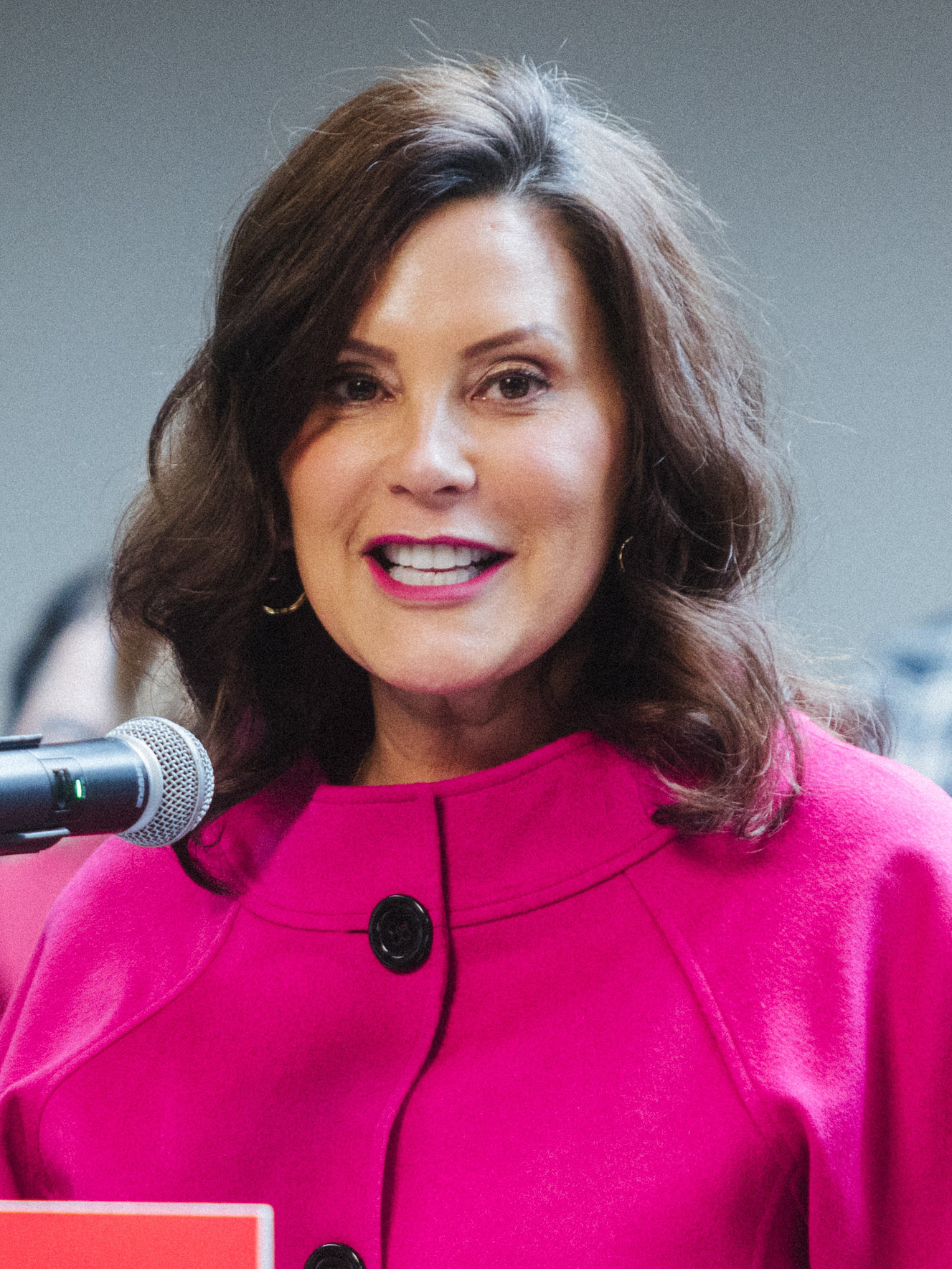
Gretchen Whitmer

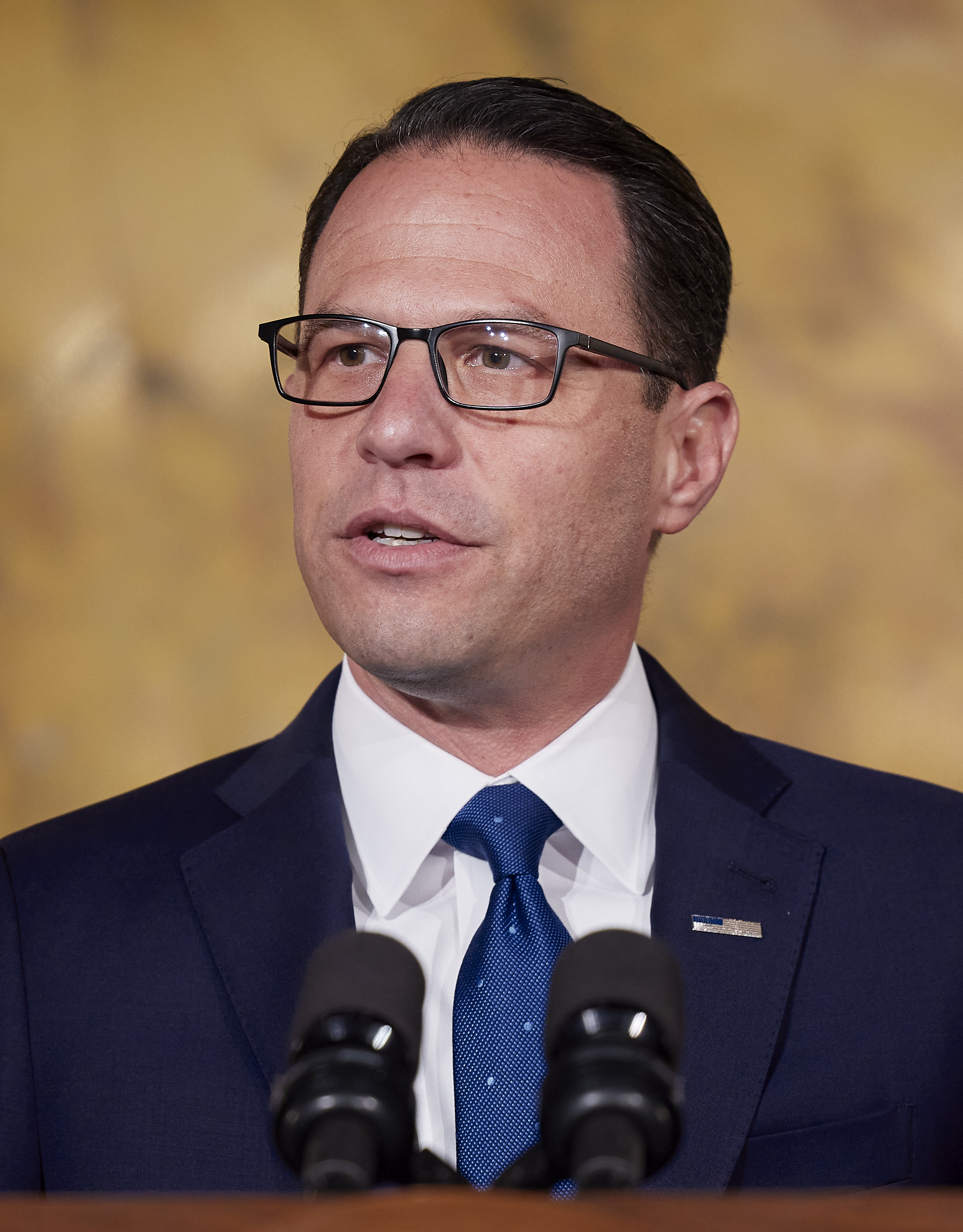
Josh Shapiro

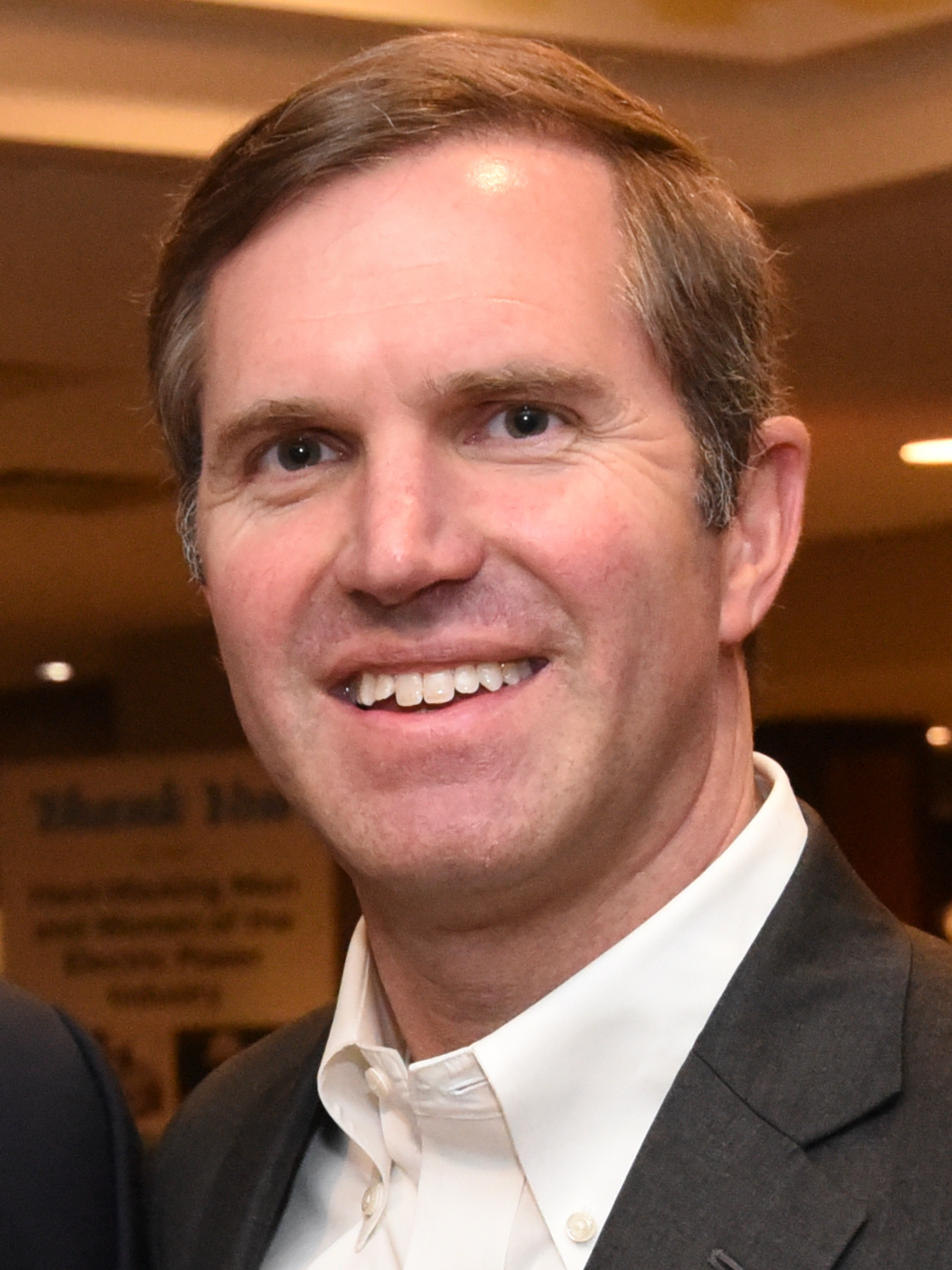
Andy Beshear

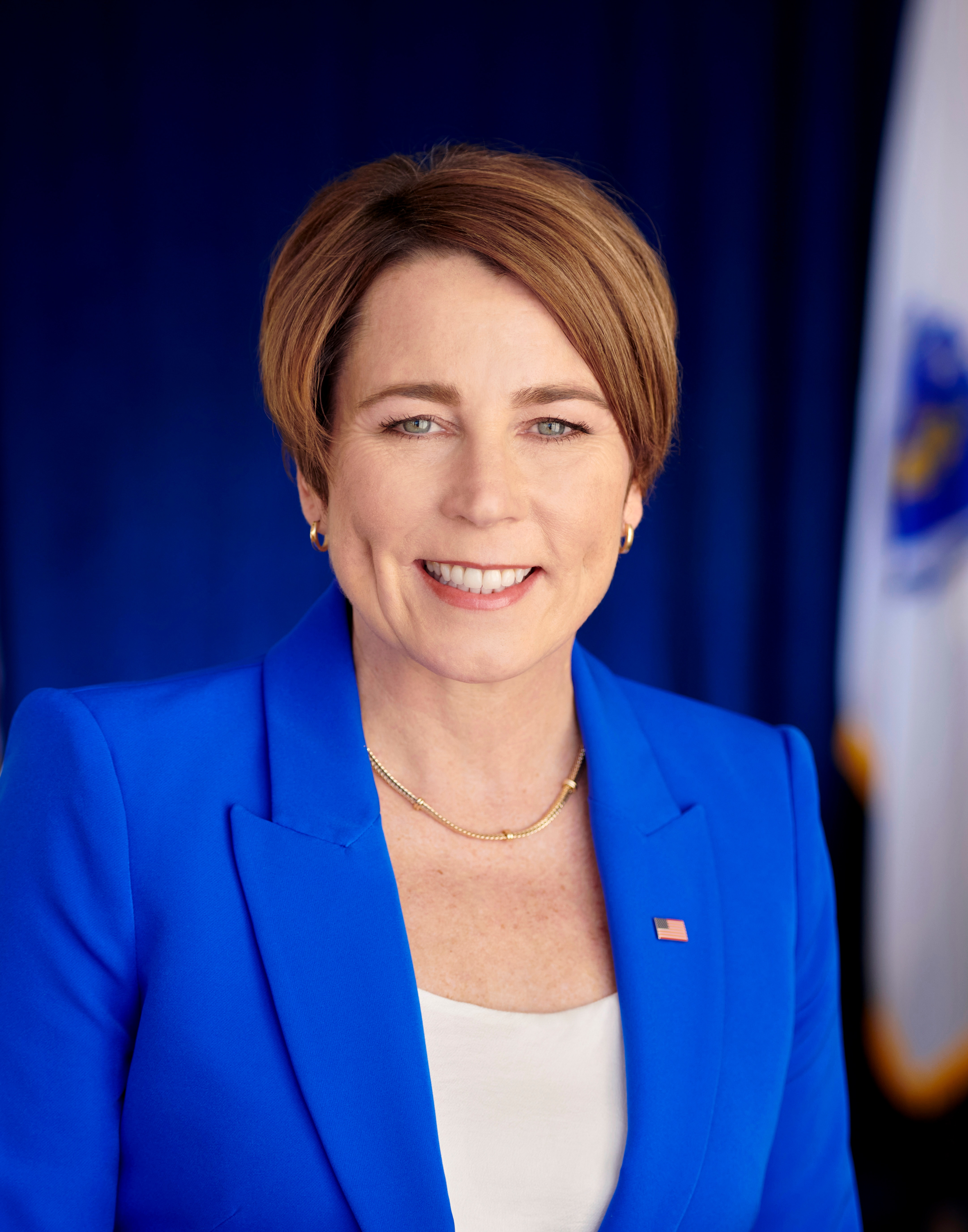
Maura Healey

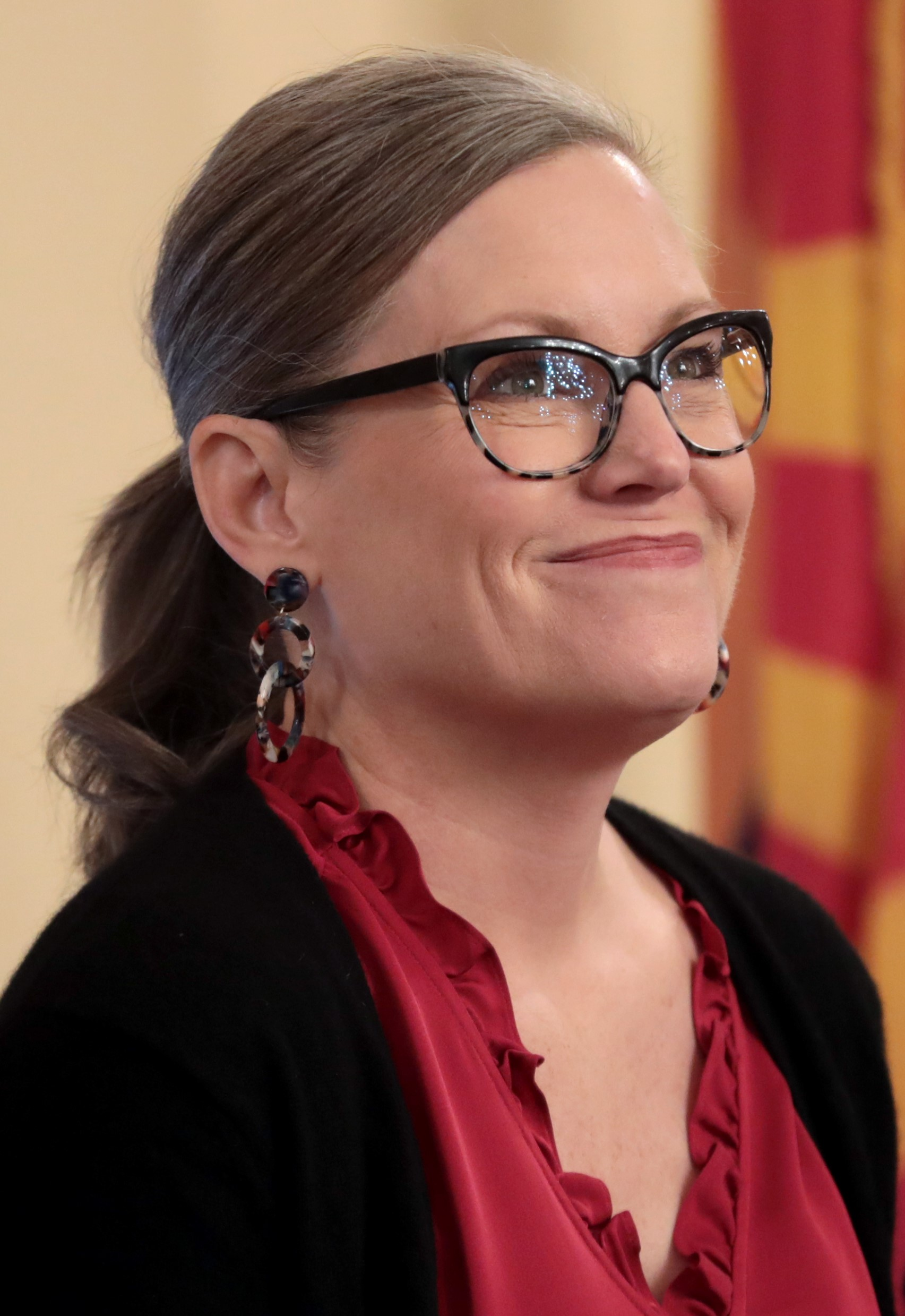
Katie Hobbs

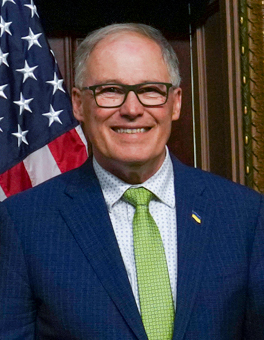
Jay Inslee

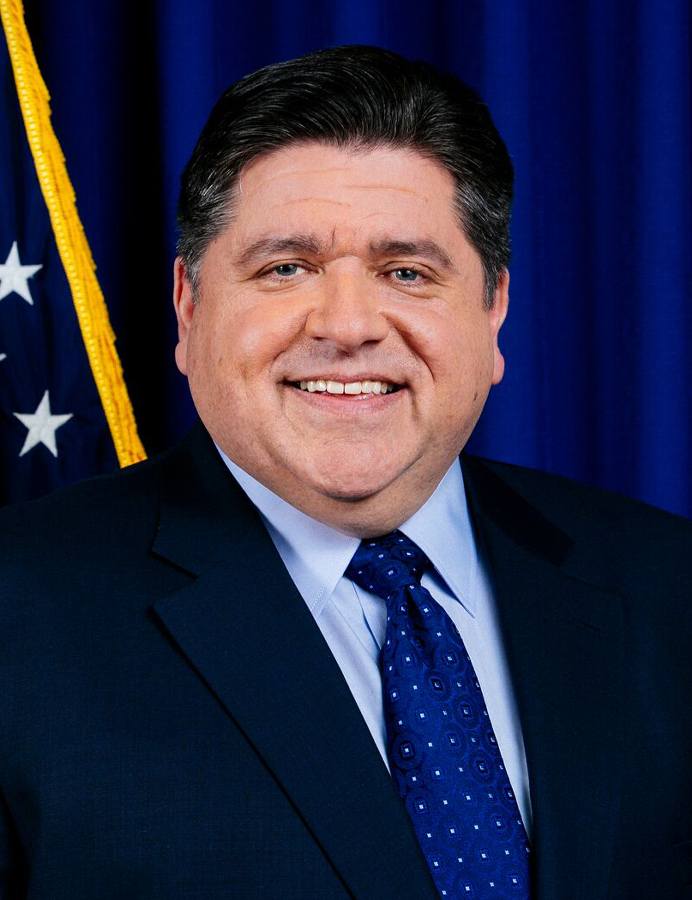
J. B. Pritzker

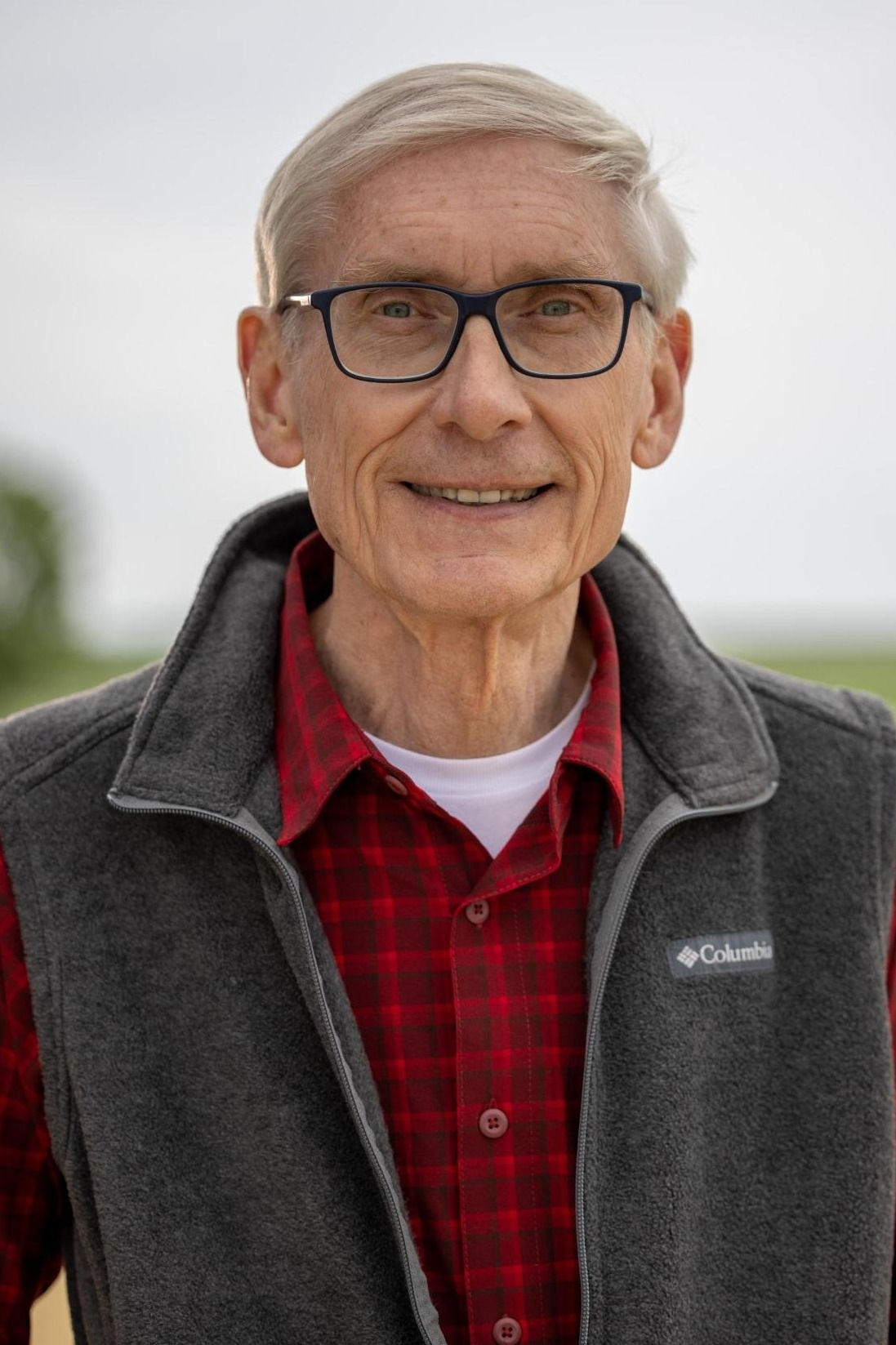
Tony Evers

All 23 incumbent Democratic state governors — including the vice presidential nominee Tim Walz of Minnesota — endorsed Harris, as well as three of the four Democratic territorial governors and one Republican governor.

- Andy Beshear, Kentucky (2019–present)
- Albert Bryan Jr., U.S. Virgin Islands (2019–present)
- John Carney, Delaware (2017–2025)
- Roy Cooper, North Carolina (2017–2025)
- Tony Evers, Wisconsin (2019–present)
- Josh Green, Hawaii (2022–present)
- Michelle Lujan Grisham, New Mexico (2019–present)
- Lou Leon Guerrero, Guam (2019–present)
- Maura Healey, Massachusetts (2023–present)
- Katie Hobbs, Arizona (2023–present)
- Kathy Hochul, New York (2021–present)
- Jay Inslee, Washington (2013–2025), 2020 candidate for the Democratic nomination for president
- Laura Kelly, Kansas (2019–present)
- Tina Kotek, Oregon (2023–present)
- Ned Lamont, Connecticut (2019–present)
- Dan McKee, Rhode Island (2021–present)
- Janet Mills, Maine (2019–present)
- Wes Moore, Maryland (2023–present)
- Phil Murphy, New Jersey (2018–2026)
- Gavin Newsom, California (2019–present)
- Pedro Pierluisi, Puerto Rico (2019–2025) (Note: Pierluisi is a member of the New Progressive Party for territorial politics, and a member of the Democratic Party for federal politics.)
- Jared Polis, Colorado (2019–present)
- J. B. Pritzker, Illinois (2019–present)
- Phil Scott, Vermont (2017–present) (Republican)
- Josh Shapiro, Pennsylvania (2023–present)
- Tim Walz, Minnesota (2019–present) (Harris's running mate)
- Gretchen Whitmer, Michigan (2019–present)

==== Former ====
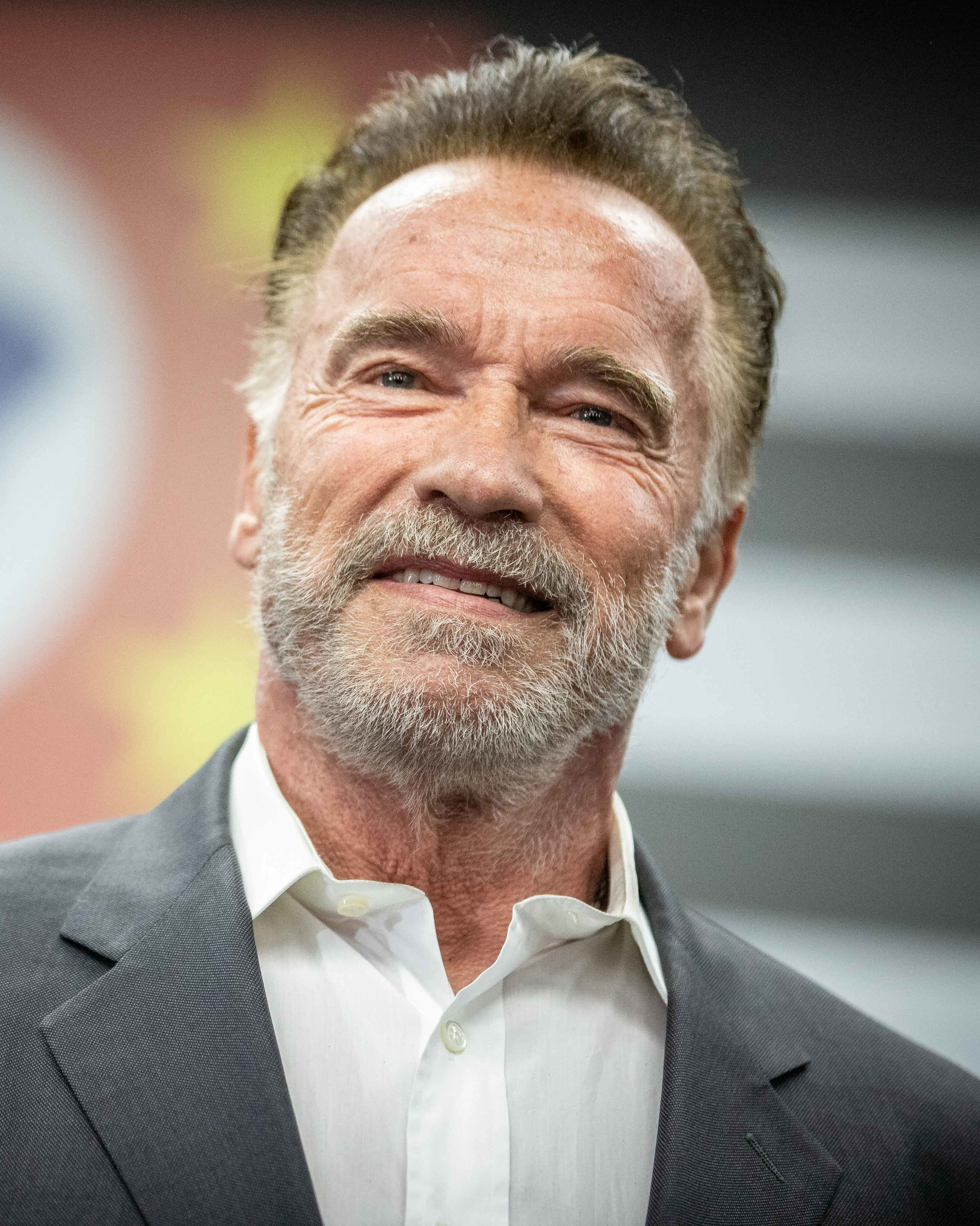
Arnold Schwarzenegger

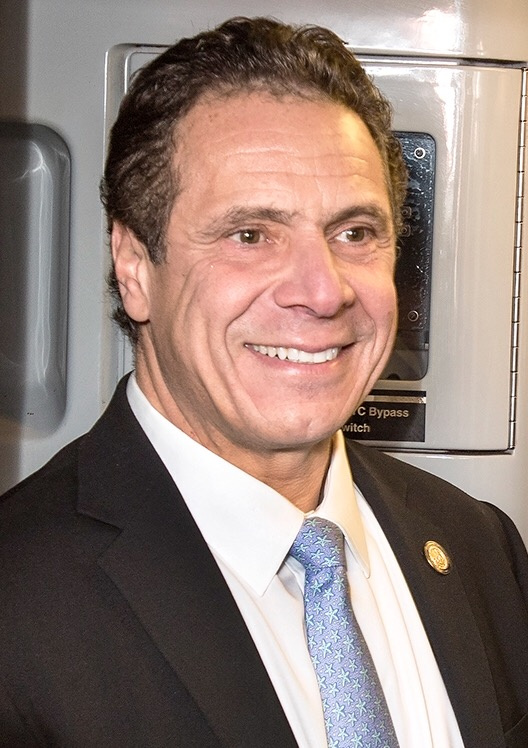
Andrew Cuomo

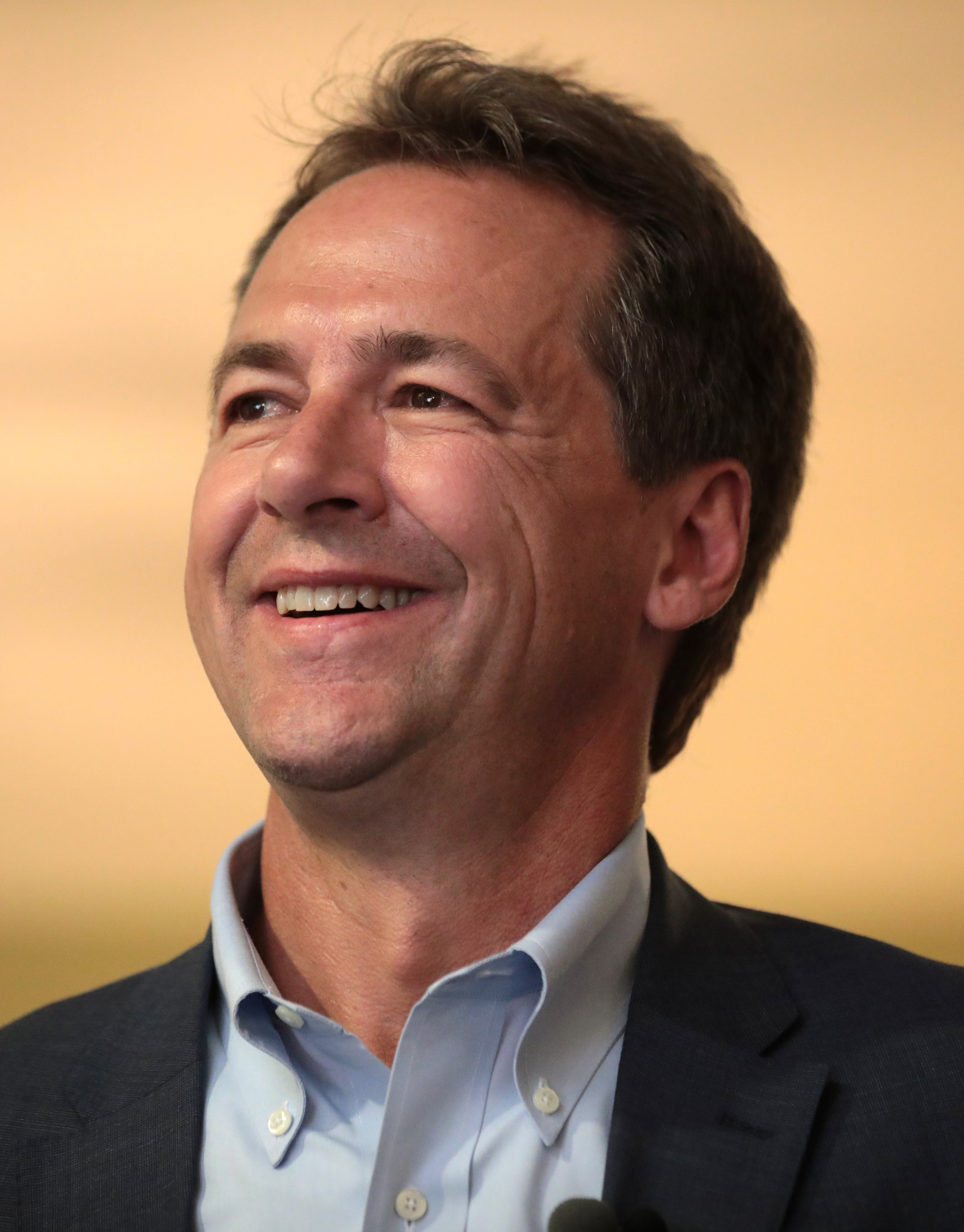
Steve Bullock

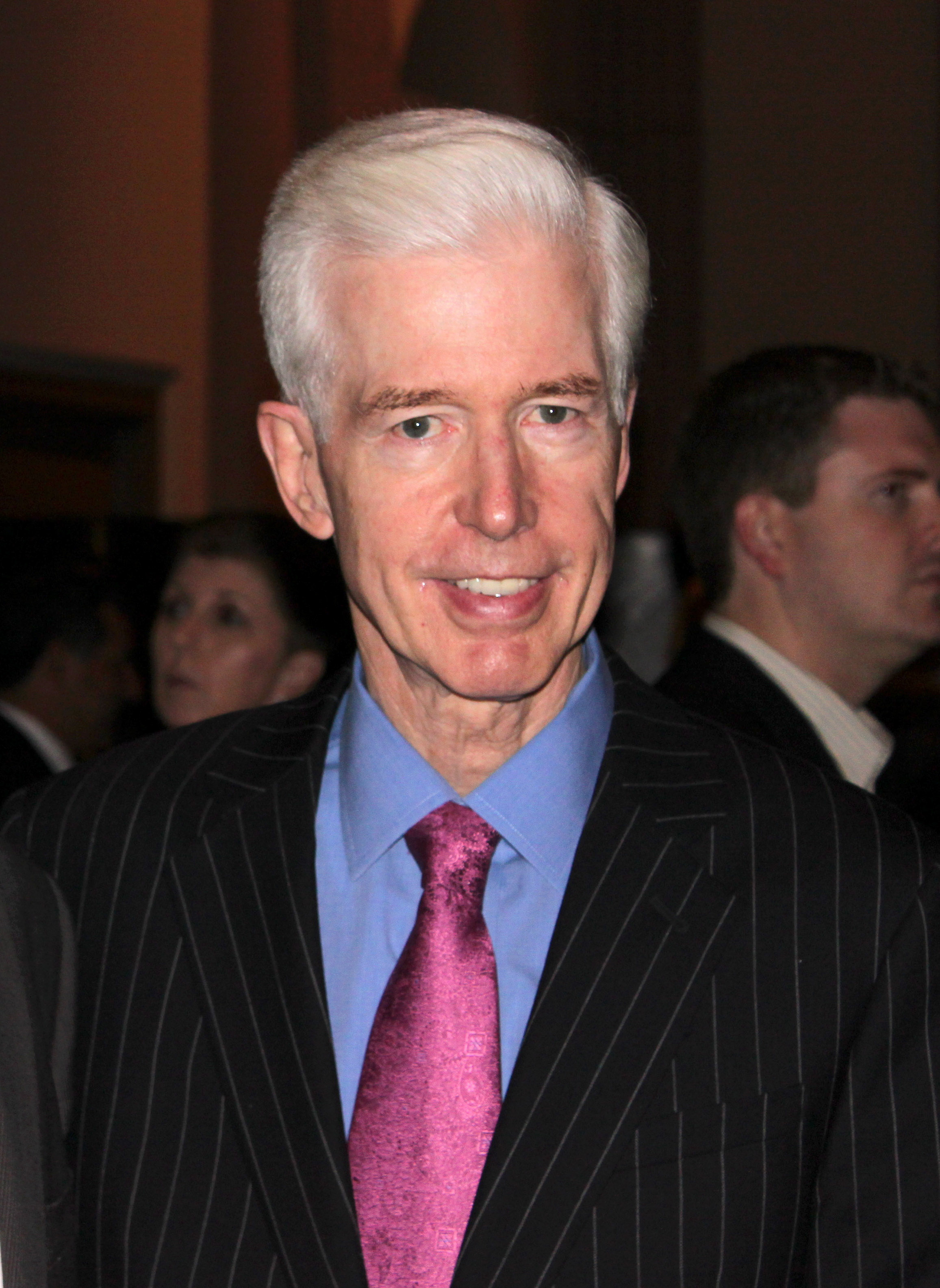
Gray Davis

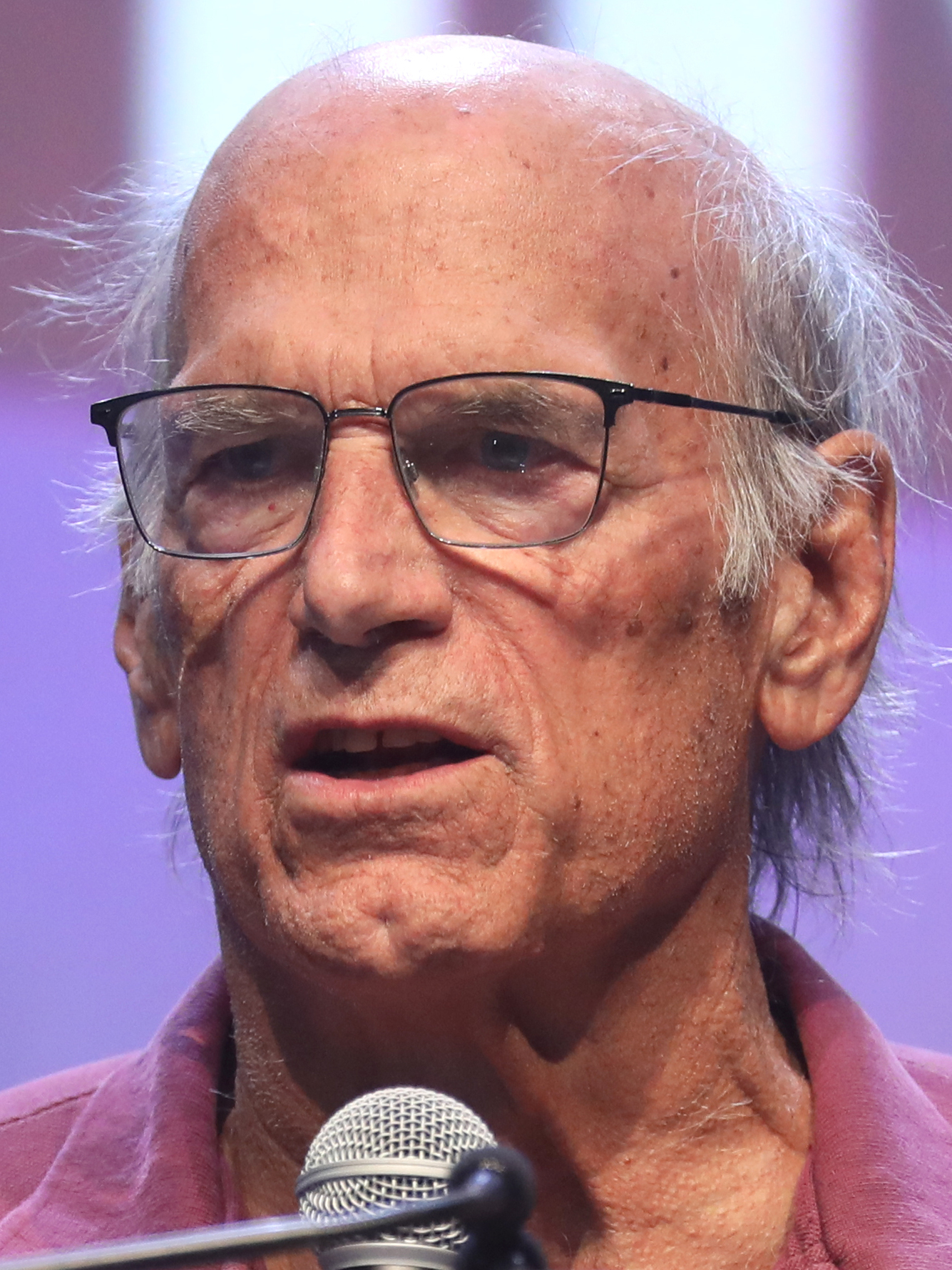
Jesse Ventura

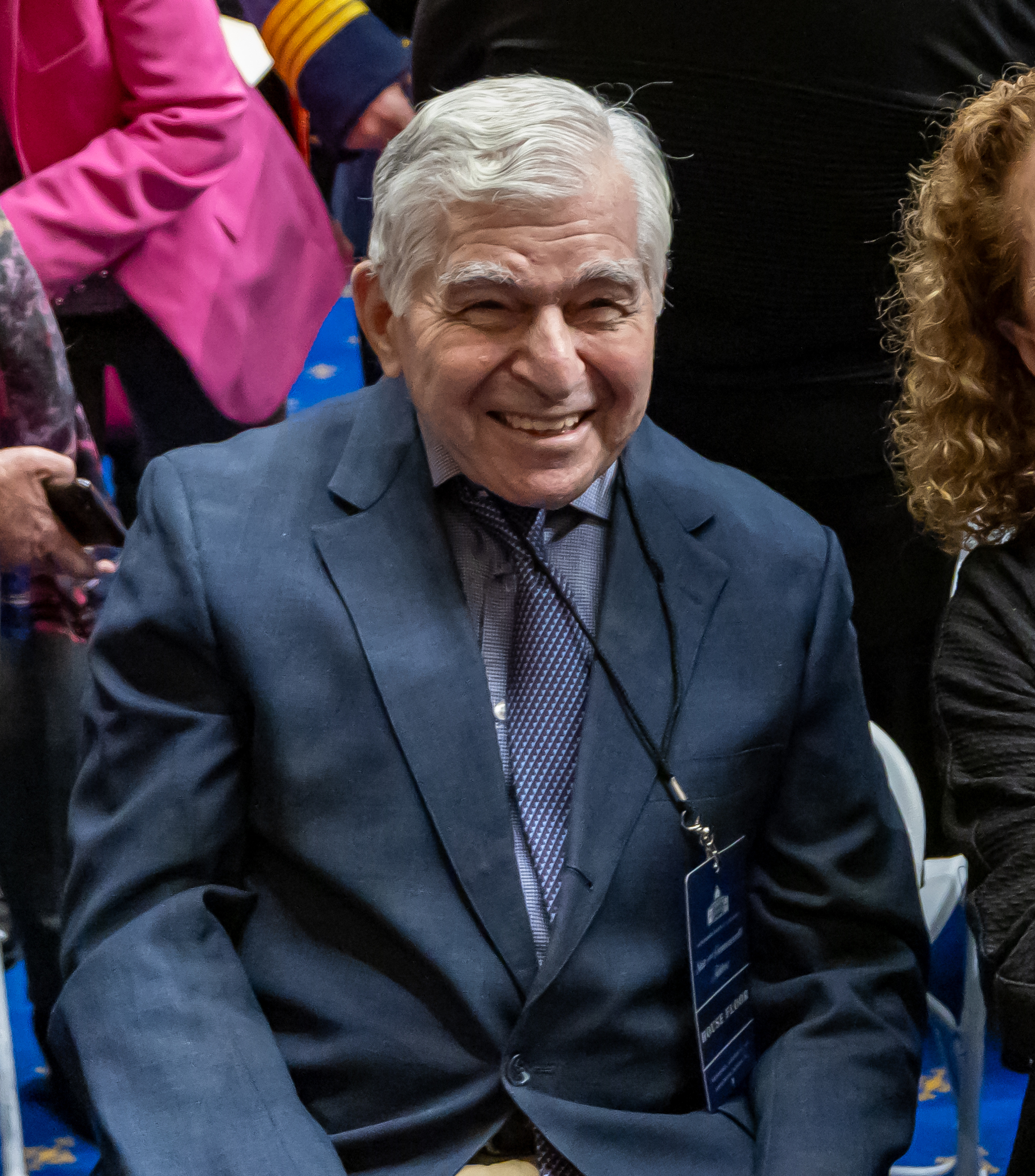
Michael Dukakis

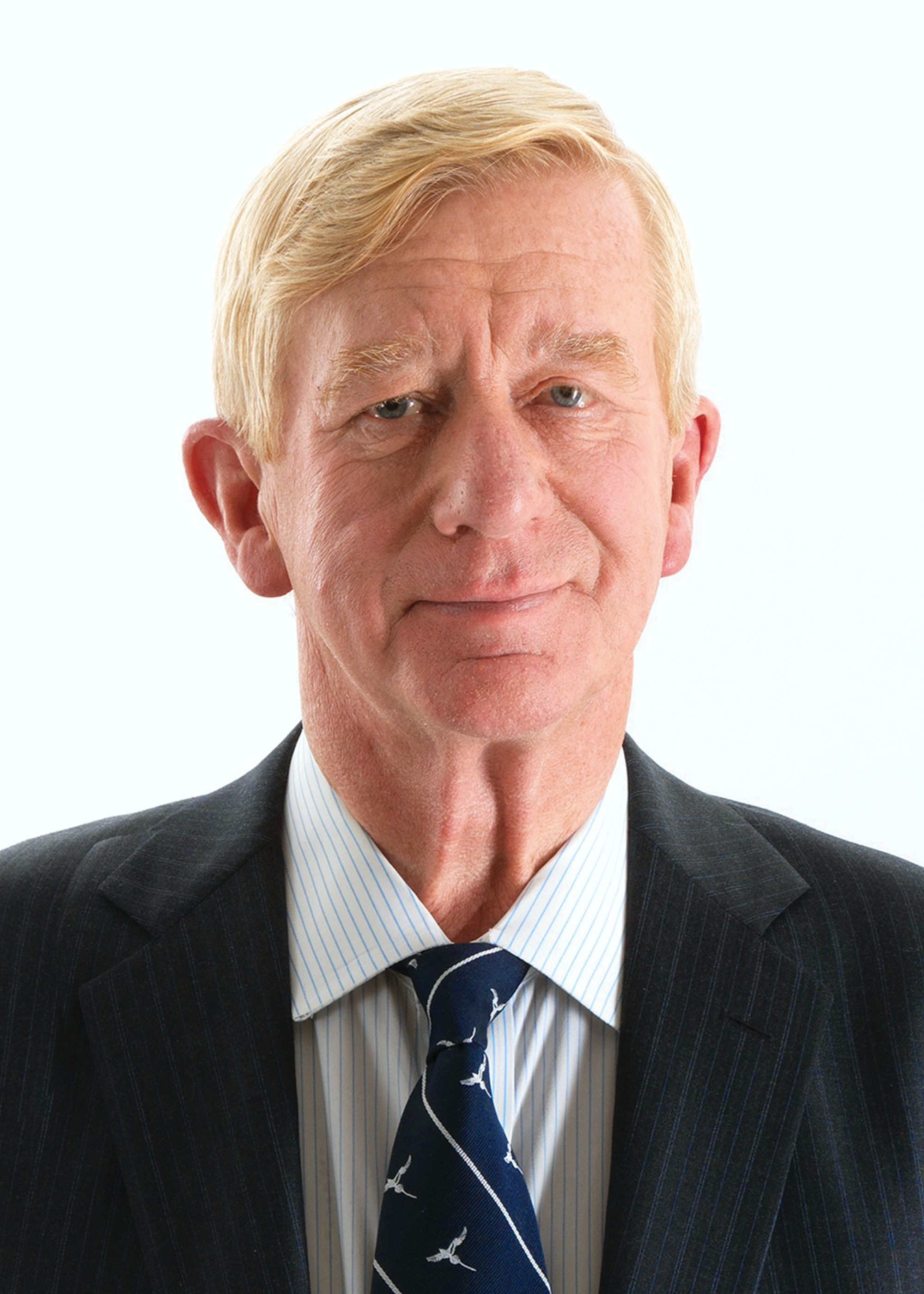
Bill Weld

- Steve Bullock, Montana (2013–2021), 2020 candidate for the Democratic nomination for president
- Arne Carlson, Minnesota (1991–1999) (Republican)
- Andrew Cuomo, New York (2011–2021)
- Gray Davis, California (1999–2003)
- Howard Dean, Vermont (1991–2003), chair of the DNC (2005–2009)
- Michael Dukakis, Massachusetts (1975–1979, 1983–1991), 1988 Democratic nominee for president
- Jim Edgar, Illinois (1991–1999) (Republican)
- John Bel Edwards, Louisiana (2016–2024)
- Tony Knowles, Alaska (1994–2002)
- Terry McAuliffe, Virginia (2014–2018), chair of the DNC (2001–2005)
- Deval Patrick, Massachusetts (2007–2015), 2020 candidate for the Democratic nomination for president
- Pat Quinn, Illinois (2009–2015)
- Ed Rendell, Pennsylvania (2003–2011), general chair of the DNC (1999–2001), mayor of Philadelphia (1992–2000)
- Roy Romer, Colorado (1987–1999), general chair of the DNC (1997–1999)
- Arnold Schwarzenegger, California (2003–2011) (Republican)
- Don Siegelman, Alabama (1999–2003)
- Steve Sisolak, Nevada (2019–2023)
- Ted Strickland, Ohio (2007–2011)
- Jesse Ventura, Minnesota (1999–2003), mayor of Brooklyn Park (1991–1995), professional wrestler (Independent, served as governor under the Reform Party)
- John D. Waiheʻe III, Hawaii (1986–1994)
- David Walters, Oklahoma (1991–1995)
- Bill Weld, Massachusetts (1991–1997), Libertarian vice presidential nominee in 2016, Republican candidate for president in 2020 (Republican)

=== Lieutenant governors ===
==== Current ====
19 of the 23 incumbent state and territorial Democratic lieutenant governors endorsed Harris.

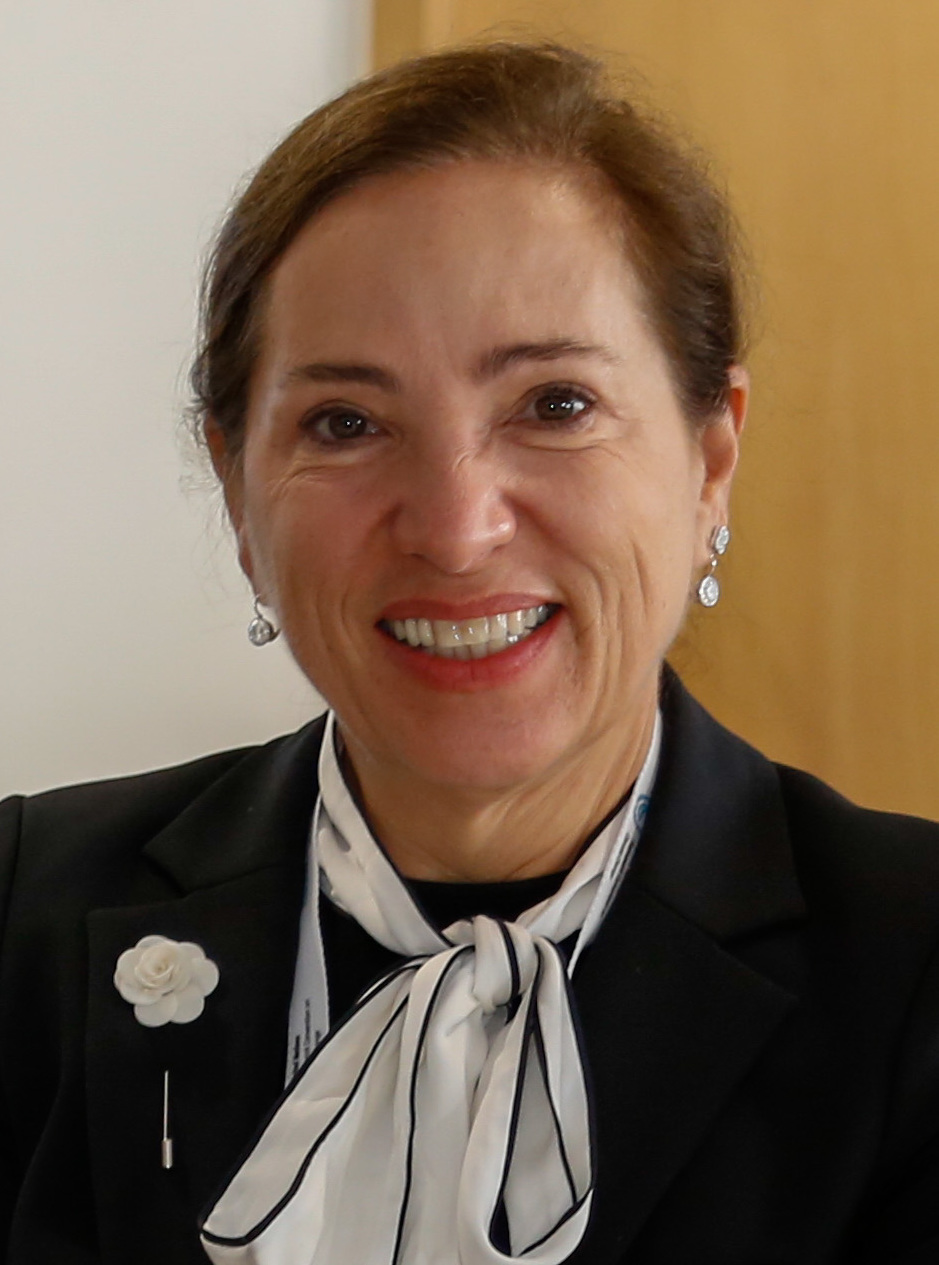
Eleni Kounalakis

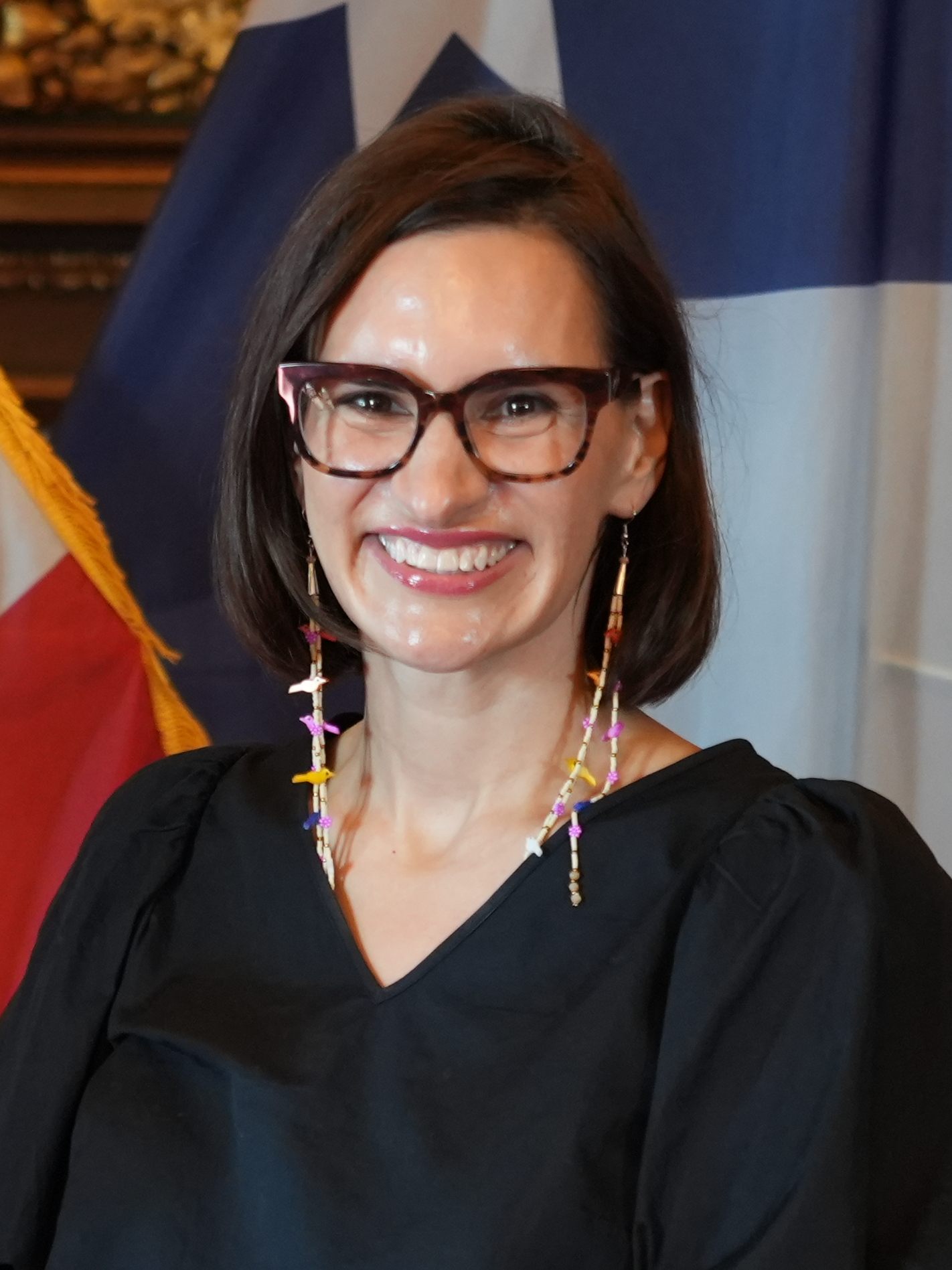
Peggy Flanagan

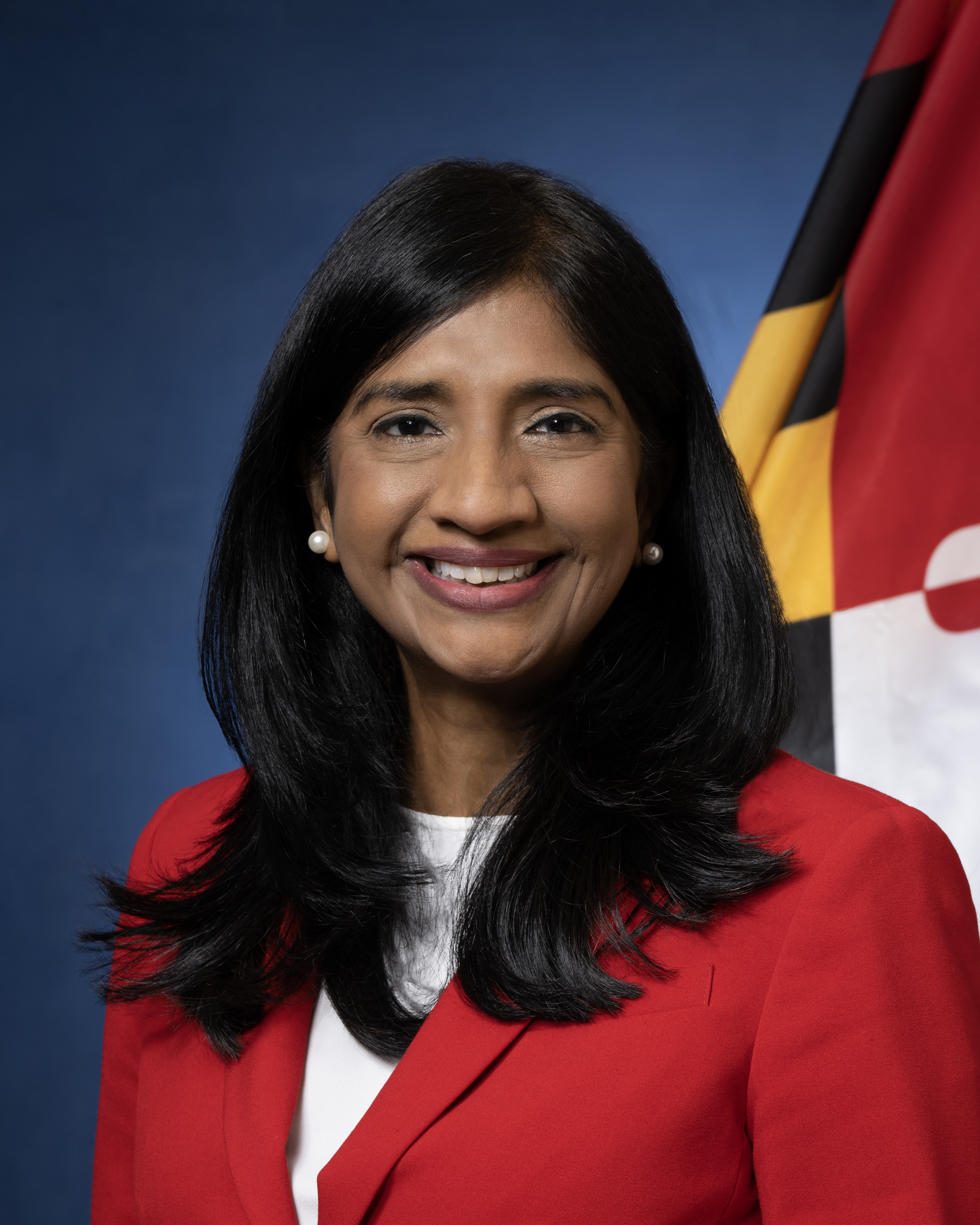
Aruna Miller

- Susan Bysiewicz, Connecticut (2019–present)
- Jacqueline Coleman, Kentucky (2019–present)
- Austin Davis, Pennsylvania (2023–present)
- Antonio Delgado, New York (2022–present)
- Kim Driscoll, Massachusetts (2023–present)
- Peggy Flanagan, Minnesota (2019–present)
- Garlin Gilchrist, Michigan (2019–present)
- Bethany Hall-Long, Delaware (2019–2025), 2024 candidate for governor
- Denny Heck, Washington (2021–present)
- Eleni Kounalakis, California (2019–present)
- Sylvia Luke, Hawaii (2022–present)
- Sabina Matos, Rhode Island (2021–present)
- Aruna Miller, Maryland (2023–present)
- Howie Morales, New Mexico (2019–present)
- Sara Rodriguez, Wisconsin (2023–present)
- Juliana Stratton, Illinois (2019–present)
- Josh Tenorio, Guam (2019–present)
- Tahesha Way, New Jersey (2023–2026), secretary of state (2018–2026)
- David Zuckerman, Vermont (2017–2021, 2023–2025) (Progressive)

==== Former ====
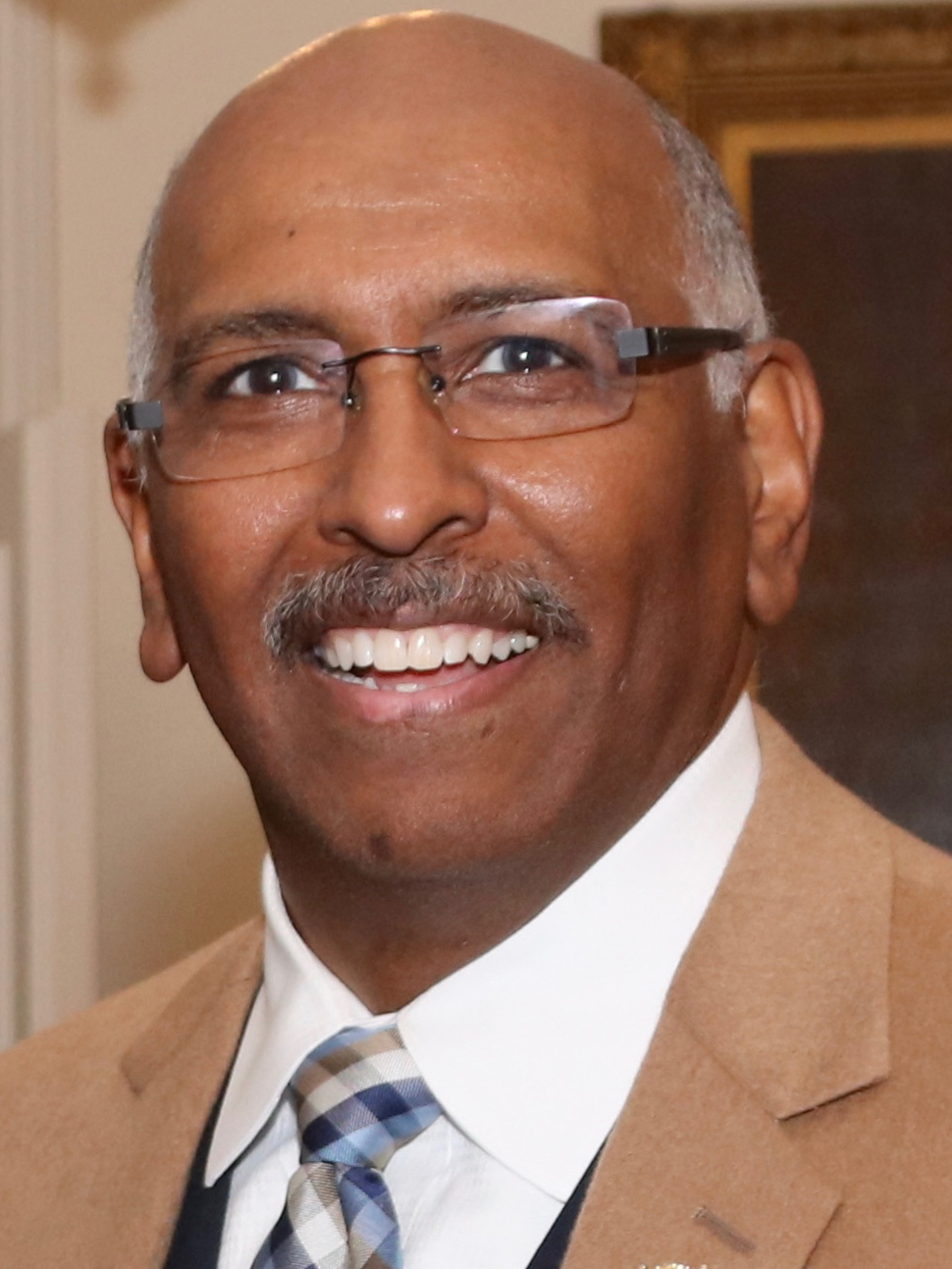
Michael Steele

- Mandela Barnes, Wisconsin (2019–2023)
- Geoff Duncan, Georgia (2019–2023) (Republican)
- Michael Steele, Maryland (2003–2007), chair of the RNC (2009–2011) (Republican)
- Mark Taylor, Georgia (1999–2007)
- Kathleen Kennedy Townsend, Maryland (1995–2003)
- Fran Ulmer, Alaska (1994–2002)

=== Attorneys general ===
==== Current ====
22 of the 25 incumbent state and territorial Democratic attorney generals endorsed Harris.

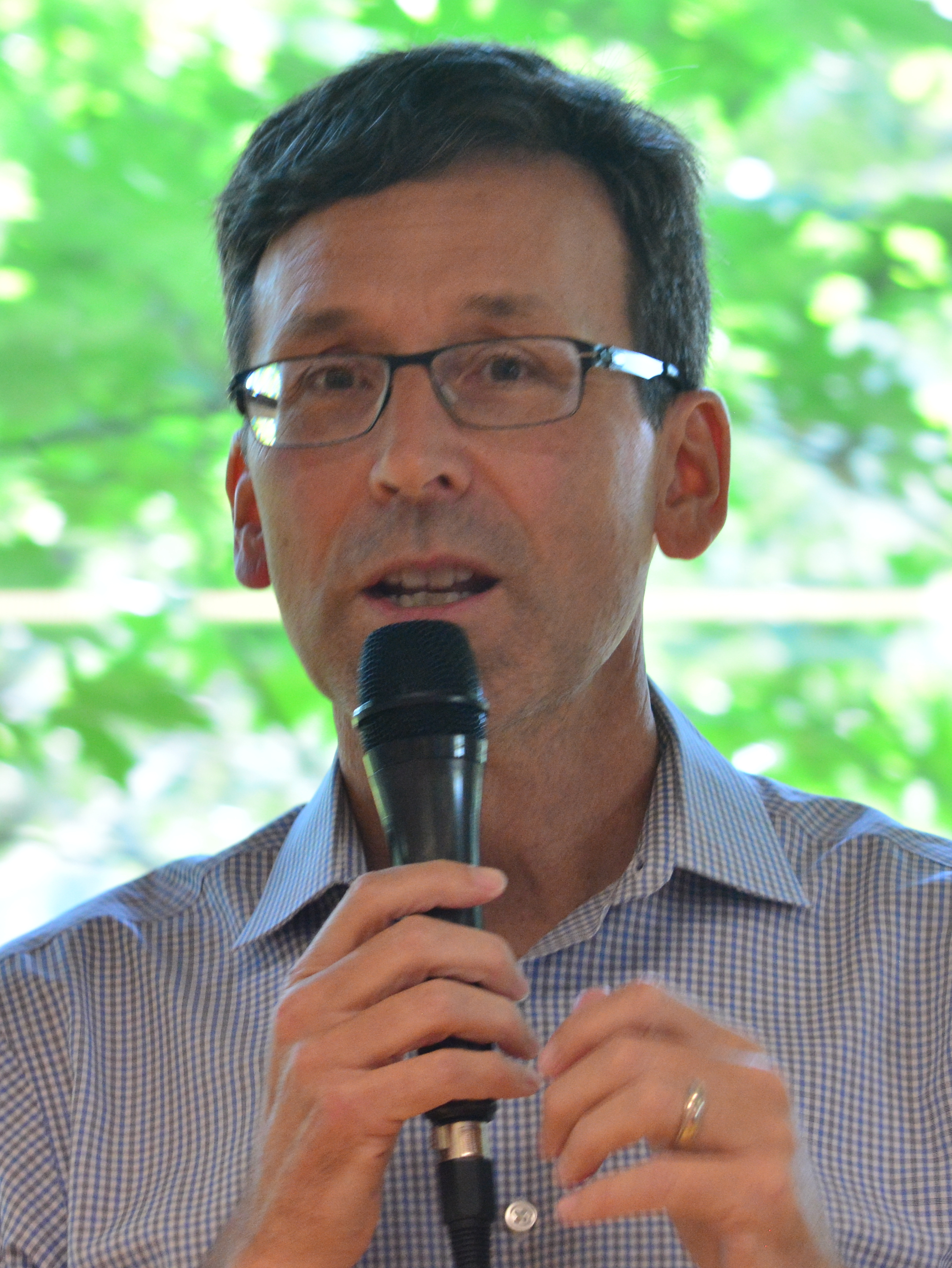
Bob Ferguson

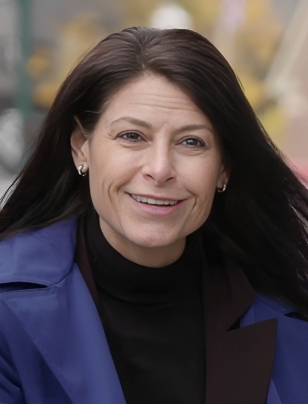
Dana Nessel

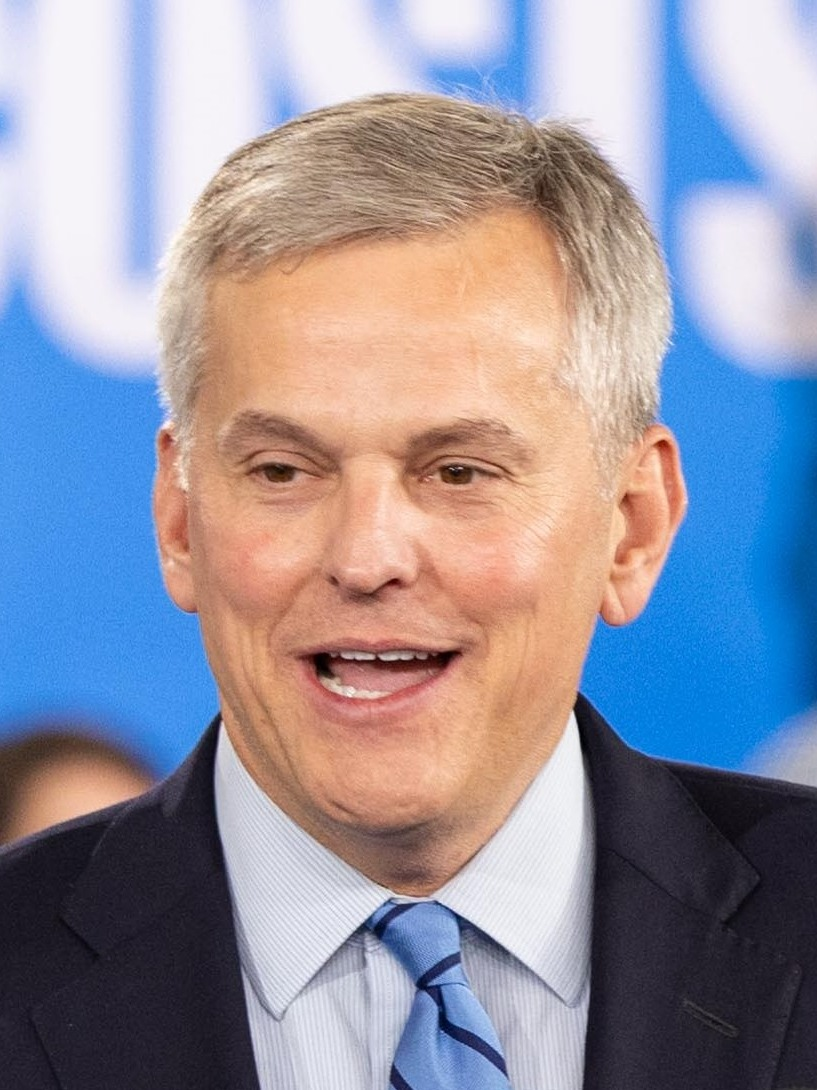
Josh Stein

- Rob Bonta, California (2021–present)
- Anthony Brown, Maryland (2023–present)
- Andrea Campbell, Massachusetts (2023–present)
- Charity Clark, Vermont (2023–present)
- Keith Ellison, Minnesota (2019–present)
- Bob Ferguson, Washington (2013–2025), 2024 Democratic nominee for governor
- Aaron D. Ford, Nevada (2019–present)
- Aaron Frey, Maine (2019–present)
- Michelle Henry, Pennsylvania (2023–2025)
- Letitia James, New York (2019–present)
- Kathy Jennings, Delaware (2019–present)
- Josh Kaul, Wisconsin (2019–present)
- Kris Mayes, Arizona (2023–present)
- Peter Neronha, Rhode Island (2019–present)
- Dana Nessel, Michigan (2019–present)
- Kwame Raoul, Illinois (2019–present)
- Ellen Rosenblum, Oregon (2012–2024)
- Brian Schwalb, District of Columbia (2023–present)
- Josh Stein, North Carolina (2017–2025), 2024 Democratic nominee for governor
- William Tong, Connecticut (2019–present)
- Raúl Torrez, New Mexico (2023–present)
- Phil Weiser, Colorado (2019–present)

==== Former ====
- Bruce Botelho, Alaska (1994–2002), mayor of Juneau, Alaska (1988–1991, 2003–2012)
- Karen Freeman-Wilson, Indiana (2000–2001), mayor of Gary, Indiana (2012–2019)
- Terry Goddard, Arizona (2003–2011), mayor of Phoenix, Arizona (1984–1990)
- Lisa Madigan, Illinois (2003–2019)
- Thomas D. Rath, New Hampshire (1978–1980) (Republican)
- James C. Smith, Florida (1979–1987), secretary of state of Florida (1987–1995, 2002–2003) (Republican)

=== Auditors, controllers, and comptrollers ===
==== Current ====
10 of the 19 incumbent state and territorial Democratic auditors endorsed Harris.

- Julie Blaha, Minnesota (2019–present)
- Malia Cohen, California (2023–present)
- Thomas DiNapoli, New York (2007–present)
- Diana DiZoglio, Massachusetts (2023–present)
- Matthew Dunlap, Maine (2021, 2022–present)
- Jessica Holmes, North Carolina (2023–2024)
- Brooke Lierman, Maryland (2023–present)
- Susana Mendoza, Illinois (2016–present)
- Sean Scanlon, Connecticut (2023–present)
- Lydia York, Delaware (2023–present)

==== Former ====
- Eugene DePasquale, Pennsylvania (2013–2021), nominee for Pennsylvania attorney general in 2024
- Bob Milligan, Florida (1995–2003) (Republican)
- Steve Westly, California (2003–2007)
- Betty Yee, California (2015–2023)

=== Secretaries of state ===
==== Current ====
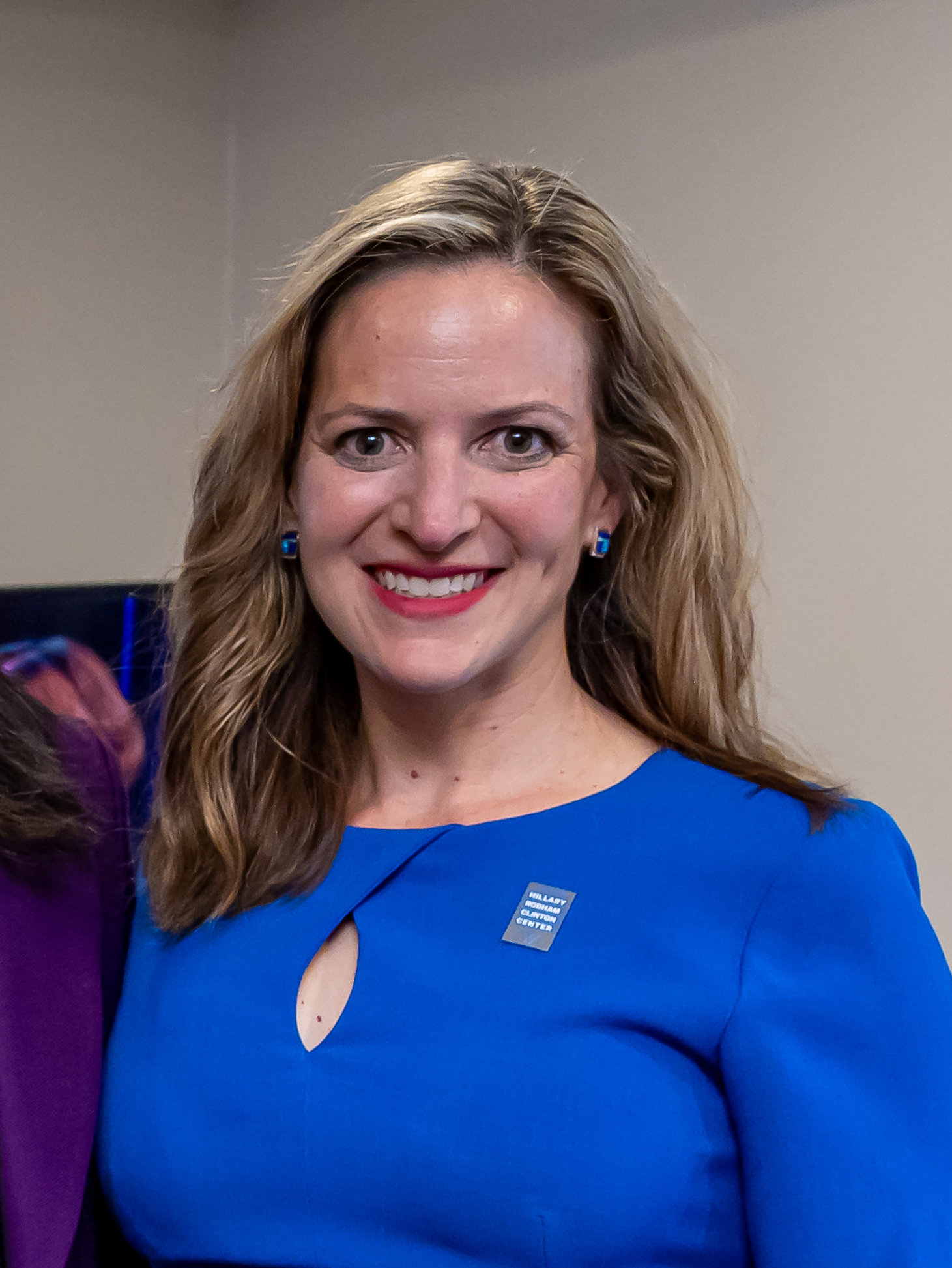
Jocelyn Benson

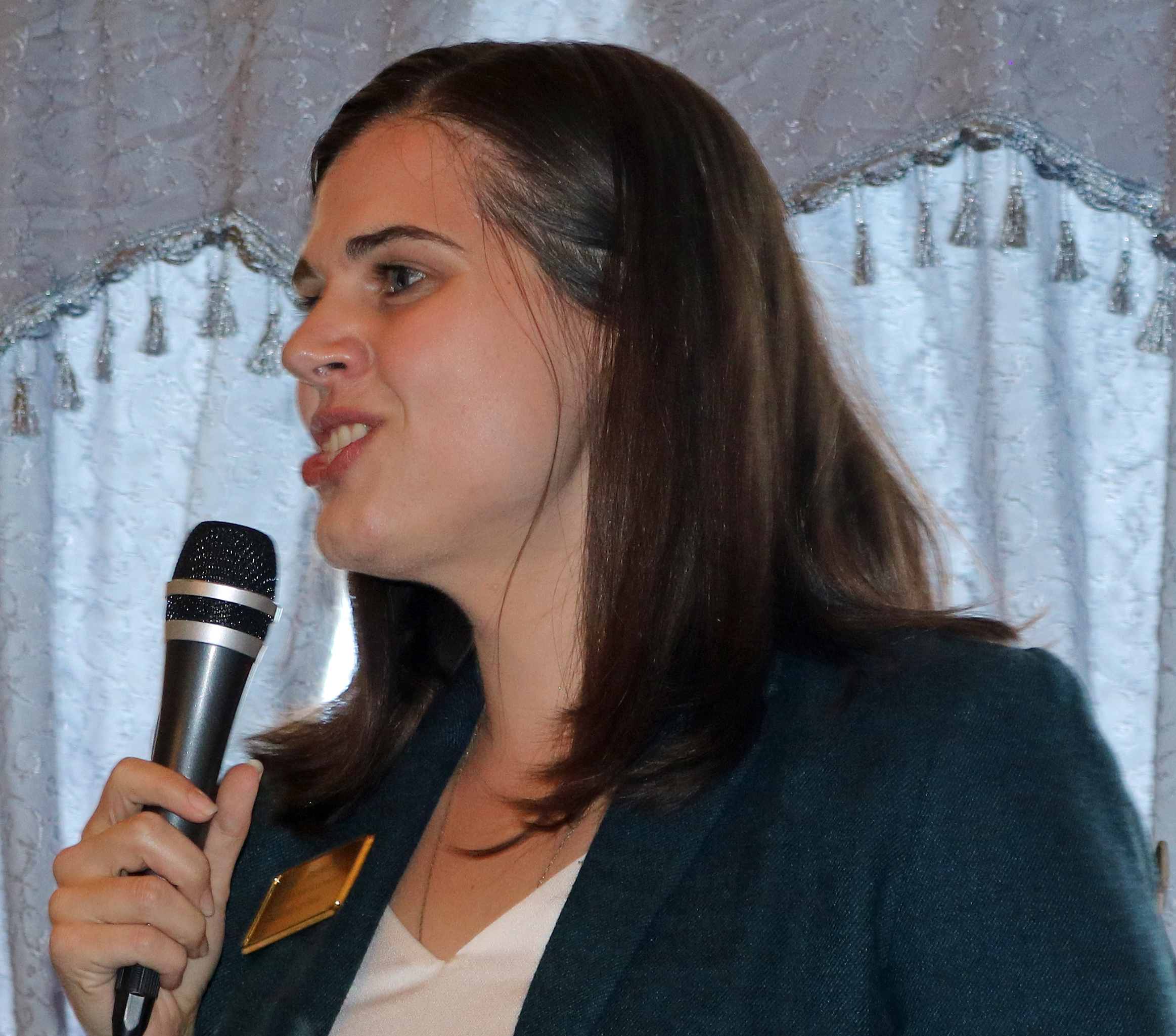
Jena Griswold

15 of the 22 incumbent state and territorial Democratic secretaries of state endorsed Harris. (Note: Tahesha Way, New Jersey lieutenant governor, also serves as New Jersey secretary of state.)

- Gregg Amore, Rhode Island (2023–present)
- Shenna Bellows, Maine (2021–present)
- Jocelyn Benson, Michigan (2019–present)
- Adrian Fontes, Arizona (2023–present)
- William F. Galvin, Massachusetts (1995–present)
- Alexi Giannoulias, Illinois (2023–present), Illinois state treasurer (2007–2011)
- Sarah Godlewski, Wisconsin (2023–present), Wisconsin state treasurer (2019–2023)
- Jena Griswold, Colorado (2019–present)
- Steve Hobbs, Washington (2021–present)
- Susan C. Lee, Maryland (2023–present)
- Elaine Marshall, North Carolina (1997–present)
- Maggie Toulouse Oliver, New Mexico (2016–present)
- Stephanie Thomas, Connecticut (2023–present)
- Shirley Weber, California (2021–present)

==== Former ====
- John Young Brown III, Kentucky (1996–2004)
- Donald M. Hooper, Vermont (1993–1995)
- Kenneth McClintock, Puerto Rico (2009–2013)
- John T. Willis, Maryland (1995–2003)

=== Treasurers ===
==== Current ====
13 of the 15 incumbent state Democratic treasurers endorsed Harris.

- Henry Beck, Maine (2019–2025)
- Zach Conine, Nevada (2019–present)
- Colleen Davis, Delaware (2019–present)
- Dereck E. Davis, Maryland (2021–present)
- James Diossa, Rhode Island (2023–present)
- Mike Frerichs, Illinois (2015–present)
- Deb Goldberg, Massachusetts (2015–present)
- Fiona Ma, California (2019–present)
- Laura Montoya, New Mexico (2023–present)
- Mike Pellicciotti, Washington (2021–present)
- Mike Pieciak, Vermont (2023–present)
- Erick Russell, Connecticut (2023–present)
- Dave Young, Colorado (2019–present)

==== Former ====
- Phil Angelides, California state treasurer (1999–2007)

=== Judicial officials ===
==== Current ====
- Anita Earls, associate justice of the North Carolina Supreme Court (2019–present)
- Allison Riggs, associate justice of the North Carolina Supreme Court (2023–present)

==== Former ====
- David G. Deininger, judge of the Wisconsin Court of Appeals from District IV (1996–2007) (Republican)
- Robert F. Orr, associate justice of the North Carolina Supreme Court (1995–2004) (Independent) (Note: Served office as a Republican.)
- Alan Page, associate justice of the Minnesota Supreme Court (1993–2015)

=== Other state officials ===
==== Current ====
- Edward Augustus, Massachusetts secretary of housing and livable communities (2023–present)
- Foster Campbell, Louisiana public service commissioner from district 5 (2003–present)
- Jacob R. Day, Maryland secretary of housing and community development (2023–present)
- Brickwood Galuteria, member of the Office of Hawaiian Affairs Board of Trustees (2022–present)
- Wanda James, regent of the University of Colorado (2023–present)
- Sandra King-Young, American Samoa director of Medicaid (2013–present)
- Ricardo Lara, California insurance commissioner (2019–present)
- Davante Lewis, Louisiana public service commissioner from district 3 (2022–present)
- Luella Marciano, resident executive of the Northern Mariana Islands Indigenous Affairs Office (2024–present), interim vice chair of the Democratic Party of the Northern Mariana Islands (2022–2025)
- Brian O'Dwyer, chair of the New York State Gaming Commission (2022–present)
- Pamela Pugh, president of the Michigan State Board of Education (2023–present)
- Liane Randolph, chair of the California Air Resources Board (2020–2025)
- Willie Lee Simmons, Mississippi transportation commissioner from Central District (2020–present)
- Leila Staffler, secretary of labor of the Northern Mariana Islands (2023–present)
- Tony Thurmond, California state superintendent of public instruction (2019–present)
- Anna Tovar, Arizona corporation commissioner (2021–2025)
- Jill Underly, superintendent of public instruction of Wisconsin (2021–present)
- Cinde Warmington, New Hampshire executive councilor (2021–2025), candidate in the 2024 New Hampshire gubernatorial election

==== Former ====
- Amy Acton, director of the Ohio Department of Health (2019–2020)
- Jane Angvik, commissioner of the Alaska Department of Commerce, Community and Economic Development (1986–1990)
- Bradley M. Campbell, commissioner of the New Jersey Department of Environmental Protection (2004–2006), president of the Conservation Law Foundation (2015–present)
- Rich Crandall, director of the Wyoming Department of Education (2013–2014), Colorado Commissioner of Education (2016) (Republican)
- Nikki Fried, Florida commissioner of agriculture (2019–2023), chair of the Florida Democratic Party (2023–present)
- Anne Holton, Virginia secretary of education (2014–2016)
- Kim Coco Iwamoto, member of the Hawaii Board of Education from Oahu at-large district (2006–2011)
- Jennifer McCormick, Indiana superintendent of public instruction (2017–2021), 2024 candidate for governor
- Colin Van Ostern, New Hampshire executive councilor (2013–2017)
- Sandy Praeger, Kansas insurance commissioner (2003–2015) (Republican)
- Brandon Presley, member of the Mississippi Public Service Commission from the Northern district (2008–2024), Democratic nominee for the 2023 Mississippi gubernatorial election
- Eric E. Whitaker, director of the Illinois Department of Public Health (2003–2007)

== Tribes/tribal leaders ==
=== Leaders ===
==== Current ====
- Darryl Brady, chairman of the Yomba Shoshone Tribe
- Maulian Bryant, executive director of the Wabanaki Alliance (2024–present)
- Robert Burkybile III, chief of the Modoc Nation (2022–present)
- Rodney Butler, chairman of the Mashantucket Pequot Tribe (2010–present)
- Elwood L. Emm, chairman of the Yerington Paiute Tribe
- Leonard Forsman, chairman of the Suquamish Tribal Nation (2005–present)
- Kirk Francis, chief of the Penobscot Nation (2006–present)
- Shannon Holsey, president of the Stockbridge–Munsee Band of Mohicans (2015–present)
- John D. Johnson Sr., president of the Lac du Flambeau Band of Lake Superior Chippewa Indians (2013–present)
- Verlon Jose, chairman of the Tohono Oʼodham Nation (2023–present)
- Robert Larsen, president of the Lower Sioux Indian Reservation (2013–present)
- Stephen Roe Lewis, governor of the Gila River Indian Community (2014–present)
- Mark Macarro, tribal chairman of the Pechanga Band of Indians (1992–present)
- Roland Maldonado, chairman of the Kaibab Band of Paiute Indians
- Robert Miguel, chairman of the Ak-Chin Indian Community (2016–present)
- Buu Nygren, president of the Navajo Nation (2023–present)
- Jack Eldon Potter Jr., chairman of the Redding Rancheria
- Terry Rambler, chairman of the San Carlos Apache Tribal Council (2010–present)
- Darrell G. Seki Sr., chairman of the Red Lake Band of Chippewa Indians (2014–present)
- Cathi Tuni, chairwoman of the Fallon Paiute Shoshone Tribe
- Steven Wadsworth, chairman of the Pyramid Lake Paiute Tribe (2024–present)
- Dackota York, chairwoman of the Fort McDermitt Paiute and Shoshone Tribe (2024–present)

==== Former ====
- Jon Greendeer, president of the Ho-Chunk Nation of Wisconsin (2011–2015)
- Jonathan Nez, president of the Navajo Nation (2019–2023), 2024 Democratic nominee for AZ-02

=== Other officials ===
==== Current ====
- Dino Beltran, vice chairman of the Koi Nation of Northern California (2018–present)
- Carlton H. Hendricks, vice chair of the Mashpee Wampanoag Tribe
- Carla L. Johnson, vice chair of the Tohono Oʼodham Nation (2023–present)
- Dwight Lomayesva, vice chairman of the Colorado River Indian Tribes (2021–present)
- Richelle Montoya, vice president of the Navajo Nation (2023–present)
- Justina Paradise, vice chairwoman of the Fort McDermitt Paiute and Shoshone Tribe
- George Thompson, vice president of the Lac du Flambeau Band of Lake Superior Chippewa
- Brandon Yellowbird-Stevens, vice-chairman of Oneida Nation of Wisconsin (2018–present)

=== Tribes ===
- Confederated Tribes of the Colville Reservation
- Mashantucket Pequot Tribe
- Paiute-Shoshone Tribe of the Fallon Reservation and Colony
- Pechanga Band of Indians
- Pyramid Lake Paiute Tribe
- San Carlos Apache Tribal Council
- Stockbridge–Munsee Band of Mohican Indians
- Suquamish Tribal Nation
- United Tribes of Bristol Bay

== State legislators ==
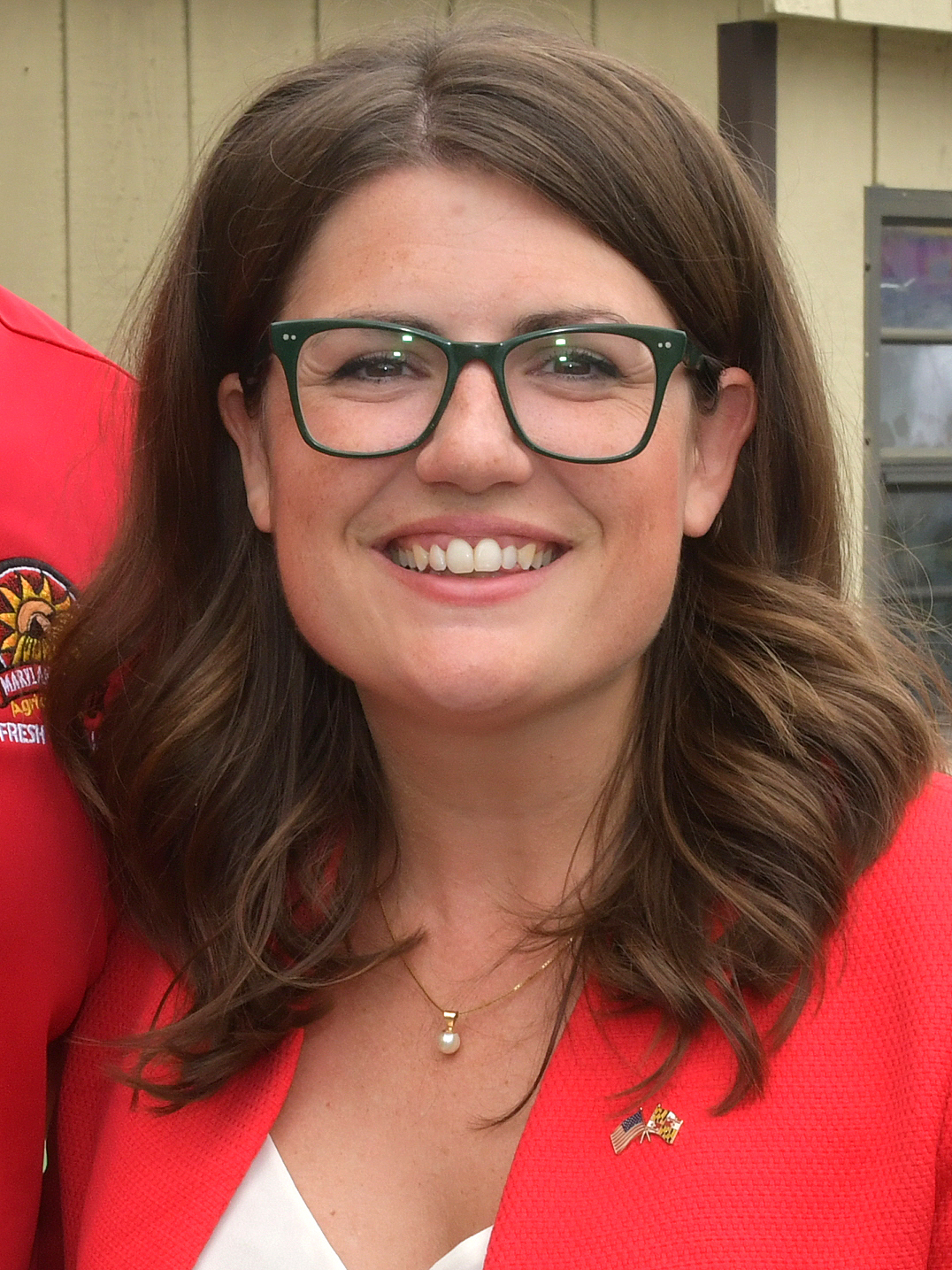
Sarah Elfreth

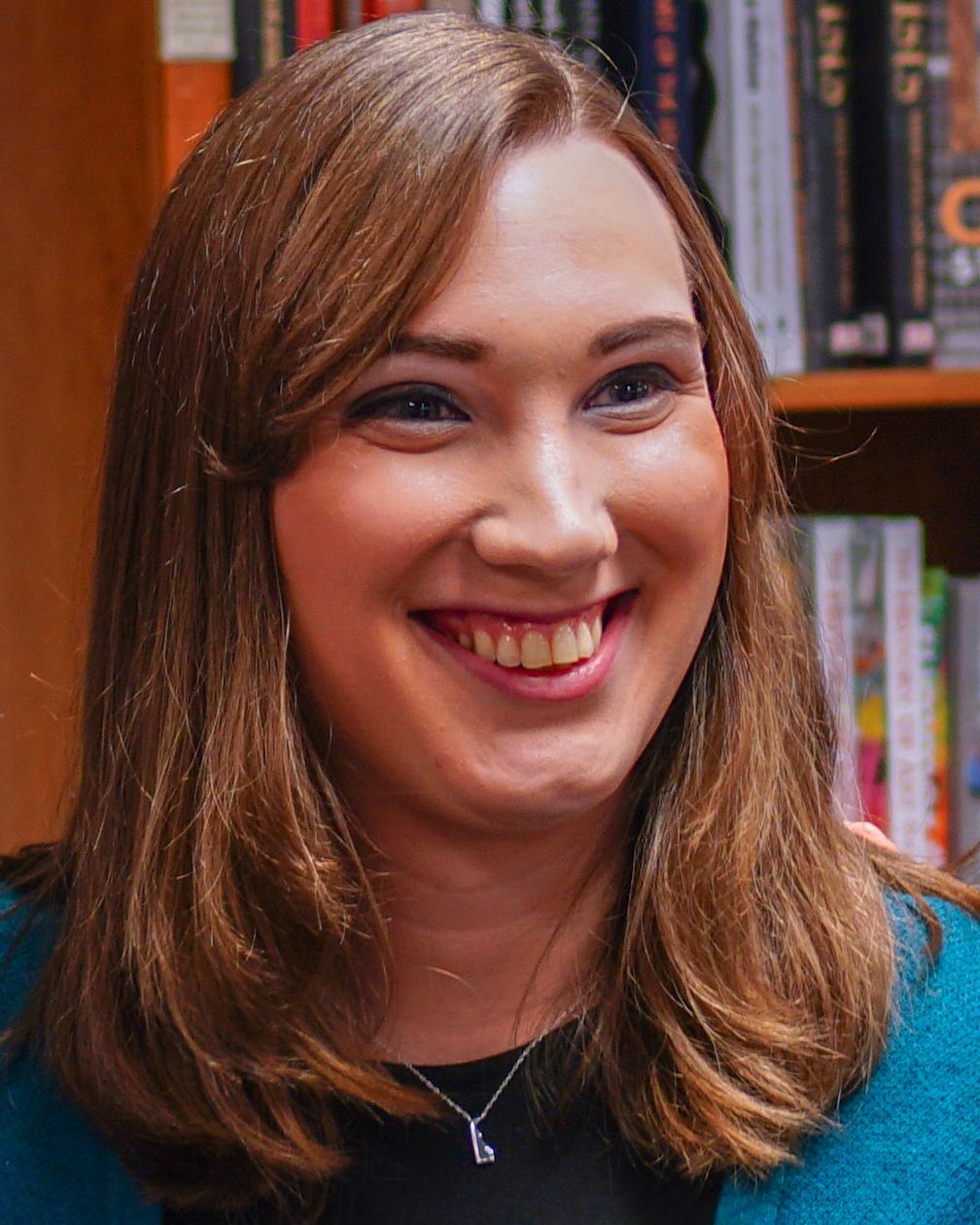
Sarah McBride

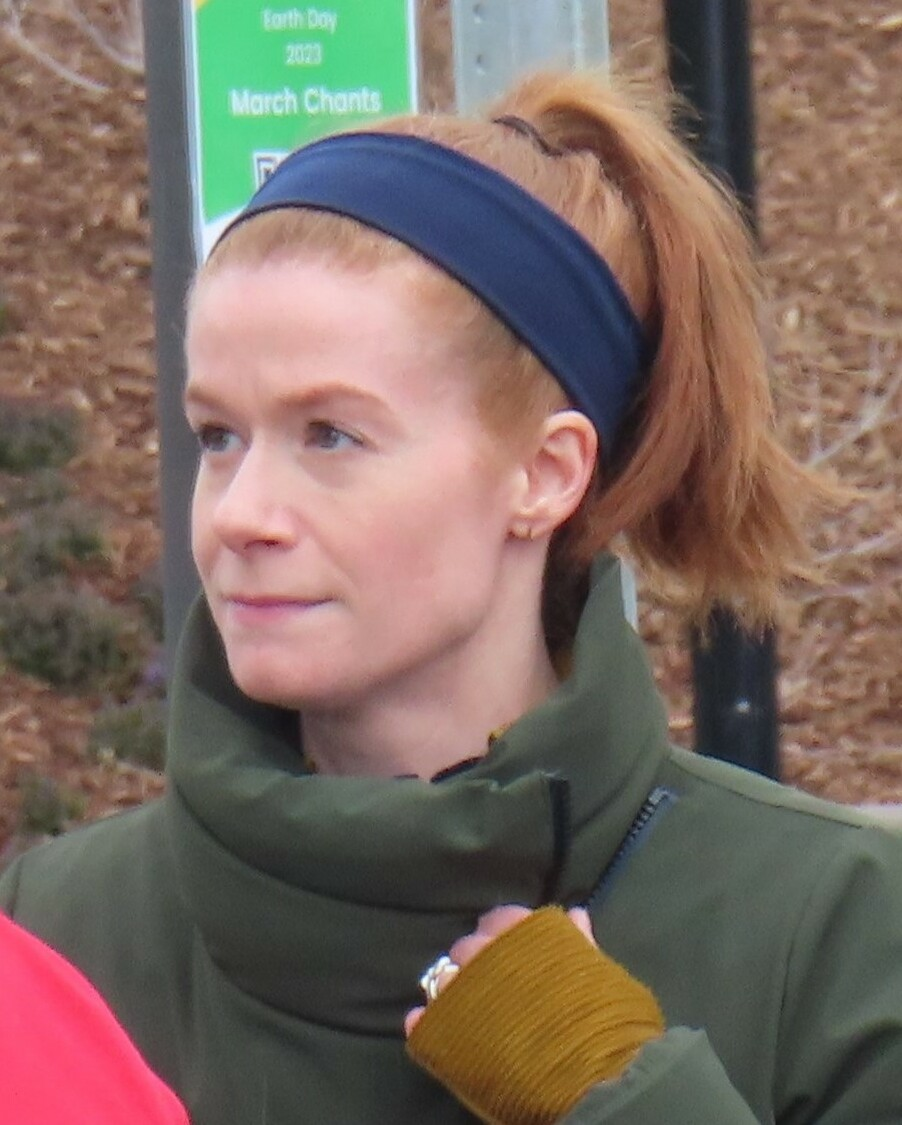
Mallory McMorrow

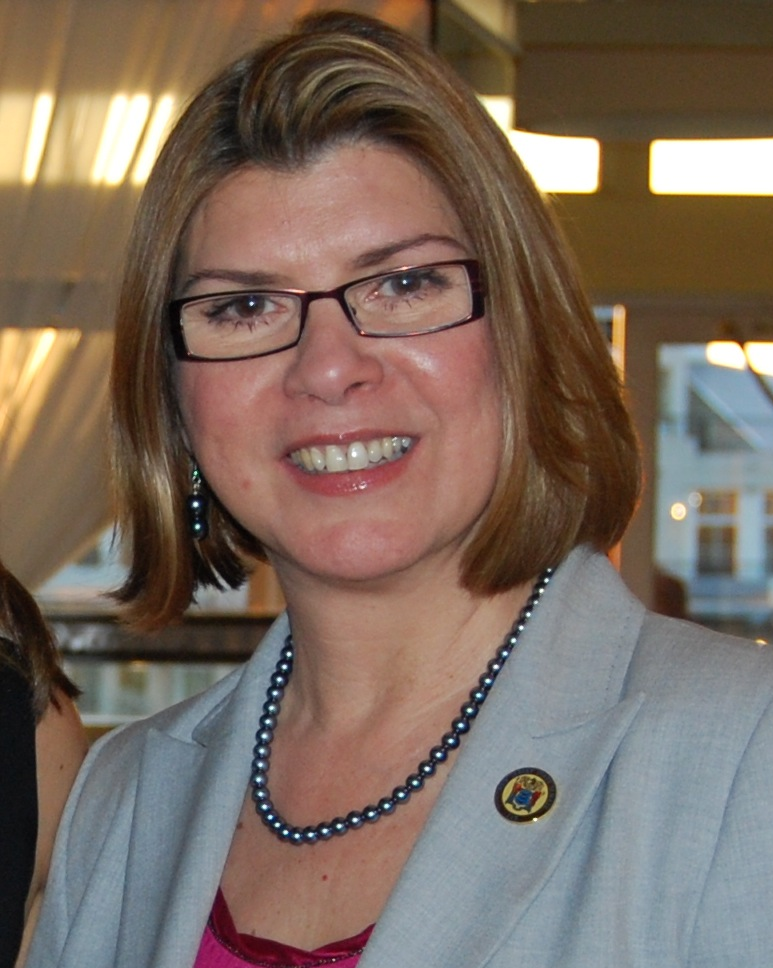
Nellie Pou

=== Upper houses ===
==== Current ====
===== Alabama Senate =====
- Merika Coleman, SD-19 (2022–present)
- Vivian Davis Figures, SD-33 (1997–present)
- Kirk Hatcher, SD-26 (2021–present)
- Robert Stewart, SD-23 (2022–present)
- Bobby Singleton, SD-24 (2005–present), minority leader

===== Alaska Senate =====
- Elvi Gray-Jackson, district G (2023–present), district I (2019–2023)
- Löki Tobin, district J (2023–present)
- Bill Wielechowski, district K (2023–present), district H (2013–2023), district J (2007–2013)

===== Arizona Senate =====
- Lela Alston, LD-5 (2023–present)
- Flavio Bravo, LD-26 (2023–present)
- Eva Burch, LD-9 (2023–2025)
- Eva Diaz, LD-22 (2023–present)
- Mitzi Epstein, LD-12 (2023–present), minority leader
- Brian Fernandez, LD-23 (2023–present)
- Rosanna Gabaldón, LD-21 (2023–present)
- Sally Ann Gonzales, LD-20 (2023–present)
- Theresa Hatathlie, LD-6 (2023–present)
- Anna Hernandez, LD-24 (2023–2025)
- Christine Marsh, LD-4 (2021–2025)
- Catherine Miranda, LD-11 (2023–present), LD-27 (2015–2019)
- Priya Sundareshan, LD-18 (2023–present)

===== Arkansas Senate =====
- Linda Chesterfield, SD-12 (2013–present), SD-34 (2011–2013)
- Stephanie Flowers, SD-8 (2023–present), SD-25 (2013–2023), SD-5 (2011–2013)
- Greg Leding, SD-30 (2019–present), minority leader
- Fredrick Love, SD-29 (2023–present), SD-35 (2011–2023)
- Reginald Murdock, SD-9 (2023–present)
- Clarke Tucker, SD-14 (2023–present), SD-32 (2021–2023)

===== California Senate =====
- Angelique Ashby, SD-8 (2022–present)
- Toni Atkins, SD-39 (2016–2024)
- Josh Becker, SD-13 (2020–present)
- Catherine Blakespear, SD-38 (2022–present)
- Steven Bradford, SD-35 (2016–2024)
- Dave Cortese, SD-15 (2020–present)
- Lena Gonzalez, SD-33 (2019–present), majority leader
- Monique Limón, SD-19 (2020–present)
- Mike McGuire, SD-2 (2014–present), president pro tempore
- Dave Min, SD-37 (2020–2024), 2024 Democratic candidate for CA-47
- Nancy Skinner, SD-9 (2016–2024)
- Tom Umberg, SD-34 (2018–present)
- Scott Wiener, SD-11 (2016–present)

===== Connecticut Senate =====
- Christine Cohen, SD-12 (2019–present)
- Herron Gaston, SD-23 (2023–present)
- Martin Looney, SD-11 (1993–present), president pro tempore
- Gary Winfield, SD-10 (2014–present)

===== Delaware Senate =====
- Sarah McBride, SD-1 (2020–2025), 2024 Democratic nominee for DE-AL

===== Florida Senate =====
- Lori Berman, SD-31 (2018–present)
- Lauren Book, SD-35 (2016–2024), minority leader
- Tracie Davis, SD-5 (2022–present)
- Shevrin Jones, SD-34 (2020–present)
- Rosalind Osgood, SD-32 (2022–present)
- Tina Polsky, SD-30 (2022–present), SD-29 (2020–2022)
- Bobby Powell, SD-24 (2022–2024), SD-30 (2016–2022)
- Geraldine Thompson, SD-15 (2022–2025), SD-12 (2012–2016)

===== Georgia Senate =====
- Tonya Anderson, SD-43 (2017–present)
- Gloria Butler, SD-55 (1999–2025), minority leader
- Gail Davenport, SD-44 (2011–present, 2007–2009)
- Jason Esteves, SD-6 (2023–2025)
- Sonya Halpern, SD-39 (2021–present)
- Ed Harbison, SD-15 (1993–present)
- Sally Harrell, SD-40 (2019–present)
- Nabilah Islam, SD-7 (2023–2026)
- Kim Jackson, SD-41 (2021–present)
- Donzella James, SD-35 (2009–present, 1994–2002)
- Emanuel Jones, SD-10 (2005–present)
- Harold V. Jones II, SD-22 (2015–present)
- David Lucas, SD-26 (2013–present)
- Derek Mallow, SD-2 (2023–present)
- Josh McLaurin, SD-14 (2023–present)
- Nikki Merritt, SD-9 (2021–present)
- Nan Orrock, SD-36 (2007–present)
- Elena Parent, SD-42 (2015–present)
- Sheikh Rahman, SD-5 (2019–present)
- Michael Rhett, SD-33 (2015–present)
- Valencia Seay, SD-34 (2003–2025)
- Freddie Sims, SD-12 (2009–present)
- Horacena Tate, SD-38 (1999–2025)

===== Hawaii Senate =====
- Joy San Buenaventura, SD-2 (2020–present)
- Stanley Chang, SD-9 (2016–present)
- Dru Kanuha, SD-3 (2018–present)
- Jarrett Keohokalole, SD-24 (2018–present)
- Michelle Kidani, SD-18 (2012–present), SD-17 (2008–2012)
- Ron Kouchi, SD-8 (2010–present), president

===== Idaho Senate =====
- Melissa Wintrow, LD-19 (2020–present), minority leader

===== Illinois Senate =====
- Laura Fine, SD-9 (2019–present)
- Michael Halpin, SD-36 (2023–present)
- Don Harmon, SD-39 (2003–present), president
- Mattie Hunter, SD-3 (2003–present)
- Adriane Johnson, SD-30 (2020–present)
- Dave Koehler, SD-46 (2006–present)
- Julie Morrison, SD-29 (2013–present)
- Steve Stadelman, SD-34 (2013–present)
- Natalie Toro, SD-20 (2023–2025)
- Rachel Ventura, SD-43 (2023–present)

===== Indiana Senate =====
- Andrea Hunley, SD-46 (2022–present)
- La Keisha Jackson, SD-34 (2024–present)
- Lonnie Randolph, SD-2 (2008–present, 1992–1998)
- Greg Taylor, SD-33 (2020–present)

===== Iowa Senate =====
- Pam Jochum, SD-36 (2023–2025), SD-50 (2013–2023), SD-14 (2009–2013), minority leader (2023–present)
- Zach Wahls, SD-43 (2023–present), SD-37 (2019–2023), minority leader (2020–2023)
- Janice Weiner, SD-45 (2023–present)

===== Kansas Senate =====
- Ethan Corson, SD-7 (2021–present)
- Pat Pettey, SD-6 (2013–present)
- Usha Reddi, SD-22 (2023–2025)
- Dinah Sykes, SD-21 (2017–present), minority leader

===== Kentucky Senate =====
- Reggie Thomas, SD-13 (2014–present)

===== Louisiana Senate =====
- Regina Barrow, SD-15 (2016–present), president pro tempore (2024–present)
- Gary Carter Jr., SD-7 (2021–present)
- Royce Duplessis, SD-5 (2022–present)

===== Maine Senate =====
- Mattie Daughtry, SD-23 (2020–present), assistant majority leader
- Jill Duson, SD-28 (2022–present)
- Troy Jackson, SD-1 (2008–2014, 2016–2024), president (2018–2024)
- Eloise Vitelli, SD-24 (2013–2024), majority leader

===== Maryland Senate =====
- Pamela Beidle, LD-32 (2019–present)
- Sarah Elfreth, LD-30 (2019–2025), 2024 Democratic nominee for MD-03
- Bill Ferguson, LD-46 (2011–present), president
- Guy Guzzone, LD-13 (2015–present)
- Antonio Hayes, LD-40 (2019–present)
- Shelly L. Hettleman, LD-11 (2020–present)
- Clarence Lam, LD-12 (2019–present)
- James Rosapepe, LD-21 (2007–present), U.S. ambassador to Romania (1998–2001)
- Jeff Waldstreicher, LD-18 (2019–present)
- Alonzo T. Washington, LD-22 (2023–present)
- Mary L. Washington, LD-43 (2019–present)
- Karen Lewis Young, LD-3 (2023–present)

===== Massachusetts Senate =====
- Julian Cyr, Cape and Islands district (2017–present)
- Lydia Edwards, Suffolk and Middlesex district 1 (2022–present)
- Adam Gomez, Hampden district (2021–present)
- Jason Lewis, Middlesex district 5 (2014–present)
- Karen Spilka, Middlesex and Norfolk district 2 (2005–present), president

===== Michigan Senate =====
- Sarah Anthony, SD-21 (2023–present)
- Winnie Brinks, SD-29 (2019–present), majority leader (2023–present)
- Darrin Camilleri, SD-4 (2023–present)
- Stephanie Chang, SD-3 (2023–present), SD-1 (2019–2023)
- Mallory McMorrow, SD-8 (2023–present), SD-13 (2019–2023), Senate majority whip
- Jeremy Moss, SD-7 (2019–present), president pro tempore
- Dayna Polehanki, SD-5 (2023–present), SD-7 (2019–2022)
- Sam Singh, SD-28 (2023–present)

===== Minnesota Senate =====
- Liz Boldon, SD-25 (2023–present)
- Scott Dibble, SD-61 (2013–present), SD-60 (2003–2013)
- Nick Frentz, SD-18 (2023–present), SD-19 (2017–2023)
- Erin Maye Quade, SD-56 (2023–present)
- Clare Oumou Verbeten, SD-66 (2023–present)

===== Mississippi Senate =====
- David Blount, SD-29 (2008–present)
- Rod Hickman, SD-32 (2021–present)
- Derrick Simmons, SD-12 (2011–present), minority leader
- Sarita Simmons, SD-13 (2020–present)

===== Missouri Senate =====
- Doug Beck, SD-1 (2021–present), minority leader (2024–present)
- Karla May, SD-4 (2019–present)

===== Montana Senate =====
- Ellie Boldman, SD-45 (2021–present)

===== Nevada Senate =====
- Nicole Cannizzaro, SD-6 (2016–present), majority leader (2019–present)
- Fabian Doñate, SD-10 (2021–present)
- Edgar Flores, SD-2 (2022–present)
- Pat Spearman, SD-1 (2012–2025), president pro tempore (2023–2025)

===== New Hampshire Senate =====
- Lou D'Allesandro, SD-20 (1998–2024)
- Becky Whitley, SD-15 (2020–2024)

===== New Jersey Senate =====
- Joseph Cryan, LD-20 (2018–present)
- Vin Gopal, LD-11 (2018–present)
- Linda R. Greenstein, LD-14 (2010–present)
- Angela V. McKnight, LD-31 (2024–present)
- Nellie Pou, LD-35 (2012–2025)
- Teresa Ruiz, LD-29 (2008–present), majority leader (2022–present)
- Nicholas Scutari, LD-22 (2004–present), president (2022–present)
- Brian P. Stack, LD-33 (2008–present), mayor of Union City (2000–present)
- Britnee Timberlake, LD-34 (2024–present)
- Andrew Zwicker, LD-16 (2022–present)

===== New Mexico Senate =====
- Linda M. Lopez, SD-11 (1997–present)
- Shannon Pinto, SD-3 (2019–present)
- Peter Wirth, SD-25 (2009–present), majority leader

===== New York Senate =====
- Jabari Brisport, SD-25 (2021–present)
- Samra Brouk, SD-55 (2021–present)
- Cordell Cleare, SD-30 (2021–present)
- Jeremy Cooney, SD-56 (2021–present)
- Michael Gianaris, SD-12 (2011–present)
- Andrew Gounardes, SD-26 (2023–present), SD-22 (2019–2022)
- Brad Hoylman-Sigal, SD-47 (2023–2025), SD-27 (2013–2022)
- John Liu, SD-16 (2019–present)
- John Mannion, SD-50 (2020–2024), 2024 Democratic nominee for NY-22
- Rachel May, SD-48 (2023–present), SD-53 (2019–2022)
- Shelley Mayer, SD-37 (2018–present)
- Zellnor Myrie, SD-20 (2019–present)
- Kevin Parker, SD-21 (2003–present)
- Roxanne Persaud, SD-19 (2015–present)
- Jessica Ramos, SD-13 (2019–present)
- Andrea Stewart-Cousins, SD-35, president pro tempore
- Kevin Thomas, SD-6 (2019–2024)
- Lea Webb, SD-52 (2023–present)

===== North Carolina Senate =====
- Gale Adcock, SD-16 (2023–present)
- Val Applewhite, SD-19 (2023–present)
- Sydney Batch, SD-17 (2021–present)
- Dan Blue, SD-14 (2009–present), minority leader (2014–2025)
- Mary Wills Bode, SD-18 (2023–2024)
- Jay Chaudhuri, SD-15 (2019–present) and SD-16 (2016–2019)
- Michael Garrett, SD-27 (2019–present)
- Lisa Grafstein, SD-13 (2023–present)
- Rachel Hunt, SD-42 (2023–2025), 2024 nominee for lieutenant governor
- Paul A. Lowe Jr., SD-32 (2015–present)
- Natasha Marcus, SD-41 (2019–2025), 2024 Democratic nominee for Commissioner of Insurance
- Julie Mayfield, SD-49 (2021–present)
- Graig Meyer, SD-23 (2023–2026)
- Mujtaba A. Mohammed, SD-38 (2019–present)
- Natalie Murdock, SD-20 (2020–present)
- Gladys A. Robinson, SD-28 (2011–present)
- DeAndrea Salvador, SD-39 (2021–present)
- Kandie Smith, SD-5 (2023–present)
- Joyce Waddell, SD-40 (2015–present)
- Mike Woodard, SD-22 (2013–2025)

===== Northern Mariana Islands Senate =====
- Celina Babauta, SD-3 (2023–present)

===== Ohio Senate =====
- Nickie Antonio, SD-23 (2019–present), minority leader (2023–present)

===== Oklahoma Senate =====
- Kay Floyd, SD-48 (2014–2024), minority leader (2018–2024)
- Julia Kirt, SD-30 (2018–present)
- George E. Young, SD-48 (2019–2024)

===== Oregon Senate =====
- Sara Gelser Blouin, SD-8 (2015–present)
- Wlnsvey Campos, SD-18 (2023–present)
- Michael Dembrow, SD-23 (2013–2025)
- Lew Frederick, SD-22 (2017–present)
- Jeff Golden, SD-3 (2019–present)
- Chris Gorsek, SD-25 (2021–present)
- Kayse Jama, SD-24 (2021–present)
- Kate Lieber, SD-14 (2021–present)
- James Manning Jr., SD-7 (2016–present), president pro tempore (2021–present)
- Mark Meek, SD-20 (2023–present)
- Deb Patterson, SD-10 (2021–present)
- Floyd Prozanski, SD-4 (2004–present)
- Janeen Sollman, SD-15 (2022–present)
- Elizabeth Steiner, SD-17 (2012–2024)
- Kathleen Taylor, SD-21 (2017–present), majority leader (2024)
- Rob Wagner, SD-19 (2018–present), Senate president (2023–present)
- Aaron Woods, SD-13 (2023–2025)

===== Pennsylvania Senate =====
- Amanda Cappelletti, SD-17 (2021–present)
- Maria Collett, SD-12 (2019–present)
- Jay Costa, SD-43 (1996–present), minority leader (2011–present)
- Jimmy Dillon, SD-5 (2022–2024)
- Marty Flynn, SD-22 (2021–present)
- Vincent Hughes, SD-7 (1994–present)
- John I. Kane, SD-9 (2021–present)
- Nick Miller, SD-14 (2023–present)
- Steve Santarsiero, SD-10 (2019–present)
- Nikil Saval, SD-1 (2021–present)
- Sharif Street, SD-3 (2017–present), chair of the Pennsylvania Democratic Party (2022–2025)

===== Rhode Island Senate =====
- Pamela J. Lauria, SD-32 (2023–present)
- Valarie Lawson, SD-14 (2019–present)
- Mark McKenney, SD-30 (2023–present, 2019–2021)
- Leonidas Raptakis, SD-33 (2003–2011, 2013–present), SD-20 (1997–2003)
- Dominick J. Ruggerio, SD-4 (1985–2003, 2005–2025), SD-6 (2003–2005), president

===== South Carolina Senate =====
- Margie Bright Matthews, SD-45 (2015–present)
- Mia McLeod, SD-22 (2017–2024) (Independent)
- Deon Tedder, SD-42 (2024–present)

===== Tennessee Senate =====
- Raumesh Akbari, SD-29 (2019–present), minority leader
- London Lamar, SD-33 (2022–present)
- Charlane Oliver, SD-19 (2023–present)

===== Texas Senate =====
- Cesar Blanco, SD-29 (2021–present)
- Sarah Eckhardt, SD-14 (2020–present)
- Nathan M. Johnson, SD-16 (2019–present)
- Jose Menendez, SD-26 (2015–present)
- Royce West, SD-23 (1993–present)

===== Utah Senate =====
- Nate Blouin, SD-13 (2023–present)
- Luz Escamilla, SD-10 (2023–present), SD-1 (2009–2023), minority leader

===== Vermont Senate =====
- Kesha Ram Hinsdale, Chittenden Southeast district (2023–present), Chittenden district (2021–2023)

===== Virginia Senate =====
- Lashrecse Aird, SD-13 (2024–present)
- Lamont Bagby, SD-14 (2024–present), SD-9 (2023–2024)
- Jennifer Boysko, SD-38 (2024–present), SD-33 (2019–2024)
- Creigh Deeds, SD-11 (2024–present), SD-25 (2001–2024)
- Adam Ebbin, SD-39 (2024–2026), SD-30 (2004–2024)
- Barbara Favola, SD-40 (2024–present), SD-31 (2012–2024)
- Jennifer Carroll Foy, SD-33 (2024–present)
- Angelia Williams Graves, SD-21 (2024–present)
- Ghazala Hashmi, SD-15 (2024–2026), SD-10 (2012–2024)
- Mamie Locke, SD-23 (2024–present), SD-2 (2004–2024)
- Louise Lucas, SD-18 (1992–present), president pro tempore
- Dave Marsden, SD-35 (2024–present), SD-37 (2010–2024)
- Jeremy McPike, SD-29 (2016–present)
- Stella Pekarsky, SD-36 (2024–present)
- Russet Perry, SD-31 (2024–present)
- Danica Roem, SD-30 (2024–present)
- Aaron Rouse, SD-22 (2024–present), SD-7 (2023–2024)
- Saddam Azlan Salim, SD-37 (2024–present)
- Suhas Subramanyam, SD-32 (2024), 2024 Democratic nominee for VA-10
- Scott Surovell, SD-34 (2016–present), majority leader
- Schuyler VanValkenburg, SD-16 (2024–present)

===== Washington Senate =====
- Manka Dhingra, LD-45 (2017–present)
- John Lovick, LD-44 (2021–present)
- Mark Mullet, LD-5 (2012–2025)
- Joe Nguyen, LD-34 (2019–2025)
- T'wina Nobles, LD-28 (2021–present)
- Emily Randall, LD-26 (2019–2024)
- Claire Wilson, LD-30 (2019–present)

===== Wisconsin Senate =====
- Robert Cowles, SD-2 (1987–2025) (Republican)
- Dianne Hesselbein, SD-27 (2023–present), minority leader
- Kelda Roys, SD-26 (2021–present)

==== Former ====
===== Alaska Senate =====
- Tom Begich, district J (2017–2023), minority leader (2019–2023)
- Hollis French, district M (2003–2013), district J (2013–2015)
- Suzanne Little, district D (1993–1994)
- Judith E. Salo, district E (1993–1996)

===== Arizona Senate =====
- Kirsten Engel, LD-10 (2021), 2024 Democratic nominee for AZ-06
- Susan Gerard, LD-18 (2001–2003) (Republican)
- Bob Worsley, LD-25 (2013–2019) (Republican)

===== California Senate =====
- Dede Alpert, SD-39 (1996–2004)
- Christine Kehoe, SD-39 (2004–2012)

===== Colorado Senate =====
- Polly Baca, SD-25 (1979–1987)

===== Connecticut Senate =====
- Mark Nielsen, SD-24 (1995–1999) (Republican)

===== Florida Senate =====
- Janet Cruz, SD-18 (2018–2022)
- Paula Dockery, SD-17 (2002–2012)
- Audrey Gibson, SD-6 (2016–2022), SD-9 (2012–2016), SD-1 (2011–2012), minority leader (2018–2020)
- Arthenia Joyner, SD-19 (2012–2016), SD-18 (2006–2012), minority leader (2014–2016)

===== Georgia Senate =====
- Jason Carter, SD-42 (2010–2015), grandson of President Jimmy Carter
- Jen Jordan, SD-6 (2017–2023)

===== Idaho Senate =====
- Cherie Buckner-Webb, LD-19 (2012–2020)

===== Illinois Senate =====
- Jacqueline Collins, SD-16 (2003–2023)

===== Indiana Senate =====
- Karen Tallian, SD-4 (2005–2021)

===== Iowa Senate =====
- Rita Hart, SD-49 (2013–2019), chair of the Iowa Democratic Party (2023–present)
- Rob Hogg, SD-33 (2007–2023)
- Steve Warnstadt, SD-1 (2003–2011)

===== Maine Senate =====
- Emily Cain, SD-30 (2012–2014)
- Susan Deschambault, SD-32 (2016–2022)
- Roger Katz, SD-15 (2014–2018), SD-24 (2010–2014) (Republican)
- Peter Mills, SD-26 (1996–2010) (Republican)
- Kevin Raye, SD-29 (2004–2012), president (2010–2012) (Republican)

===== Maryland Senate =====
- Melony G. Griffith, LD-25 (2019–2023), president pro tempore (2020–2023)

===== Michigan Senate =====
- Curtis Hertel Jr., SD-23 (2015–2023), 2024 Democratic nominee for MI-7
- Gilda Jacobs, SD-14 (2003–2010)

===== Missouri Senate =====
- Steve Danner, SD-28 (1991–1995)
- Marvin Singleton, SD-32 (1990–2003) (Republican)

===== Montana Senate =====
- Robyn Driscoll, SD-26 (2013–2017), chair of the Montana Democratic Party (2019–present)
- Jon Sesso, SD-37 (2013–2021)

===== New Hampshire Senate =====
- Melanie Levesque, SD-12 (2018–2020)

===== New York Senate =====
- Alessandra Biaggi, SD-34 (2019–2022)
- Raymond A. Meier, SD-47 (1997–2007) (Republican)

===== Northern Mariana Islands Senate =====
- David M. Cing, SD-2 (1992–2004)

===== Ohio Senate =====
- Mark Mallory, SD-9 (1999–2005)

===== Rhode Island Senate =====
- Sandra Cano, SD-8 (2018–2024)

===== South Carolina Senate =====
- Marlon Kimpson, SD-42 (2013–2023)

===== Utah Senate =====
- Patrice Arent, SD-4 (2002–2006)
- Scott Howell, SD-8 (1989–2000), minority leader (1992–2000)

===== Wisconsin Senate =====
- Barbara Lorman, SD-13 (1980–1994) (Republican)
- Dale Schultz, SD-17 (1991–2015), majority leader (2005–2007) (Republican)

=== Unicameral legislatures ===
==== Current ====
===== Guam Legislature =====
- Tina Rose Muña Barnes, at-large (2019–present, 2007–2017, 2003–2005)

===== Nebraska Legislature =====
- Carol Blood, LD-3 (2017–2025)
- Jen Day, LD-49 (2021–2025)
- Terrell McKinney, LD-11 (2021–present)
- Tony Vargas, LD-7 (2017–2025), 2024 Democratic nominee for NE-2

==== Former ====
===== Guam Legislature =====
- Regine Biscoe Lee, at-large (2017–2021)
- Judith Won Pat, at-large (1994–2017), speaker (2008–2017)

===== Nebraska Legislature =====
- Al Davis, LD-43 (2013–2017)
- Matt Hansen, LD-26 (2015–2023)
- John S. McCollister, LD-20 (2015–2023) (Republican)

=== Lower houses ===
==== Current ====
===== Alabama House of Representatives =====
- Adline Clarke, HD-97 (2013–present)
- Anthony Daniels, HD-53 (2014–present), minority leader (2017–present)
- Barbara Drummond, HD-103 (2014–present)
- Phillip Ensler, HD-74 (2022–present)
- Juandalynn Givan, HD-60 (2010–present)
- Marilyn Lands, HD-10 (2024–present)

===== Alaska House of Representatives =====
- Andy Josephson, HD-13 (2023–present), HD-15 (2013–2023)
- Genevieve Mina, HD-19 (2023–present)

===== American Samoa House of Representatives =====
- Malaeoletalu Melesio Gurr, HD-8 (2023–present)

===== Arizona House of Representatives =====
- Cesar Aguilar, LD-26 (2023–present)
- Lorena Austin, LD-9 (2023–present)
- Seth Blattman, LD-9 (2023–present)
- Junelle Cavero, LD-11 (2024–present)
- Lupe Contreras, LD-22 (2023–present), minority leader (2023–present)
- Patty Contreras, LD-12 (2023–present)
- Quantá Crews, LD-26 (2023–present)
- Nancy Gutierrez, LD-18 (2023–present)
- Stephanie Stahl Hamilton, LD-21 (2023–present), LD-10 (2021)
- Alma Hernandez, LD-20 (2023–present), LD-3 (2019–2023)
- Consuelo Hernandez, LD-21 (2023–present)
- Lydia Hernandez, LD-24 (2023–present), LD-29 (2013–2015)
- Melody Hernandez, LD-8 (2023–2025), LD-26 (2021–2023)
- Sarah Liguori, LD-5 (2024–present), LD-28 (2021–2023)
- Charles Lucking, LD-5 (2024–2025)
- Elda Luna-Nájera, LD-22 (2024–present)
- Christopher Mathis, LD-18 (2023–present)
- Deborah Nardozzi, LD-8 (2024–2025)
- Analise Ortiz, LD-24 (2023–2025)
- Jennifer Pawlik, LD-13 (2023–2025), LD-17 (2019–2023)
- Mae Peshlakai, LD-6 (2023–present)
- Mariana Sandoval, LD-23 (2023–present)
- Oscar De Los Santos, district 11 (2023–present)
- Keith Seaman, LD-16 (2023–2025)
- Judy Schwiebert, LD-2 (2023–2025), LD-20 (2021–2023)
- Stacey Travers, LD-12 (2023–present)
- Myron Tsosie, LD-6 (2023–present), LD-7 (2019–2023)
- Betty Villegas, LD-20 (2023–present)

===== Arkansas House of Representatives =====
- Fred Allen, HD-77 (2006–present)
- Nicole Clowney, HD-86 (2019–present)
- Andrew Collins, HD-35 (2019–present)
- Denise Jones Ennett, HD-36 (2019–present)
- Deborah Ferguson, HD-63 (2023–2025), HD-51 (2013–2023)
- Ken Ferguson, HD-16 (2015–present)
- Vivian Flowers, HD-65 (2014–2025)
- Denise Garner, HD-20 (2019–present)
- Ashley Hudson, HD-75 (2021–present)
- Steve Magie, HD-56 (2013–present)
- Tippi McCullough, HD-33 (2019–present), minority leader (2021–present)
- Milton Nicks Jr., HD-35 (2015–2025)
- Mark Perry, HD-66 (2023–present)
- Jay Richardson, HD-49 (2019–present)
- Jamie Aleshia Scott, HD-72 (2023–2025)
- Tara Shephard, HD-79 (2023–present)
- Joy Springer, HD-34 (2020–present)
- David Whitaker, HD-22 (2013–present)

===== California Assembly =====
- Dawn Addis, AD-30 (2022–present)
- Jasmeet Bains, AD-35 (2022–present)
- Marc Berman, AD-23 (2022–present), AD-24 (2016–2022)
- Tasha Boerner, AD-77 (2022–present), AD-76 (2018–2022)
- Mia Bonta, AD-18 (2021–present)
- Wendy Carrillo, AD-52 (2022–2024), AD-51 (2017–2022)
- Sabrina Cervantes, AD-58 (2022–2024)
- Mike Fong, AD-49 (2022–present)
- Laura Friedman, AD-43 (2016–2024)
- Mike Gipson, AD-65 (2014–present)
- Tim Grayson, AD-15 (2022–2024), AD-14 (2016–2022)
- Ash Kalra, AD-25 (2022–present), AD-27 (2016–2022)
- Alex Lee, AD-24 (2022–present), AD-25 (2020–2022)
- Evan Low, AD-26 (2014–2024), 2024 Democratic candidate for CA-16
- Robert A. Rivas, AD-29 (2022–present), AD-30 (2018–2022), speaker (2023–present)
- Phil Ting, AD-19 (2012–2024)
- Chris Ward, AD-78 (2020–present)
- Buffy Wicks, AD-14 (2022–present), AD-15 district (2018–2022)
- Lori Wilson, AD-11 (2022–present)
- Rick Zbur, AD-51 (2022–present)

===== Colorado House of Representatives =====
- Jennifer Bacon, HD-7 (2021–present)
- Meg Froelich, HD-3 (2019–present)
- Leslie Herod, HD-8 (2017–2025)
- Junie Joseph, HD-10 (2023–present)
- Naquetta Ricks, HD-40 (2021–present)
- Manny Rutinel, HD-32 (2023–present)

===== Connecticut House of Representatives =====
- Eleni Kavros DeGraw, HD-17 (2021–present)
- Josh Elliott, HD-88 (2017–present)
- Tammy Exum, HD-19 (2020–present)
- Kate Farrar, HD-20 (2021–present)
- Corey Paris, HD-145 (2021–present)
- Matthew Ritter, HD-1 (2011–present), speaker (2021–present)

===== Florida House of Representatives =====
- Daryl Campbell, HD-94 (2022–present)
- Kevin Chambliss, HD-117 (2020–present)
- Lindsay Cross, HD-60 (2022–present)
- Dan Daley, HD-96 (2019–present)
- LaVon Bracy Davis, HD-40 (2022–2025)
- Fentrice Driskell, HD-67 (2018–present), minority leader (2022–present)
- Anna V. Eskamani, HD-42 (2018–present)
- Ashley Gantt, HD-109 (2022–present)
- Dianne Hart, HD-61 (2018–present)
- Christine Hunschofsky, HD-96 (2020–present)
- Johanna López, HD-43 (2022–present)
- Michele Rayner, HD-62 (2020–present)
- Marie Woodson, HD-105 (2022–present), district 101 (2020–2022)

===== Georgia House of Representatives =====
- Solomon Adesanya, HD-43 (2023–present)
- Segun Adeyina, HD-110 (2023–present)
- Kimberly Alexander, HD-66 (2013–present)
- Teri Anulewicz, HD-42 (2017–2025)
- Michelle Au, HD-50 (2023–present), HD-48 (2021–2023)
- Imani Barnes, HD-86 (2023–present)
- Debra Bazemore, HD-69 (2023–present), HD-63 (2017–2023)
- Eric Bell II, HD-75 (2023–present)
- Karen Bennett, HD-94 (2013–2025)
- James Beverly, HD-143 (2013–2025), HD-139 (2011–2013), minority leader (2021–2025)
- Roger Bruce, HD-61 (2013–2025), HD-64 (2005–2013), HD-45 (2003–2005)
- Debbie Buckner, HD-137 (2013–present), HD-130 (2005–2013), HD-109 (2003–2005)
- Rhonda Burnough, HD-77 (2017–present)
- Lisa Campbell, HD-35 (2023–present)
- Park Cannon, HD-58 (2016–present)
- Doreen Carter, HD-93 (2023–present), HD-92 (2015–2023)
- Jasmine Clark, HD-108 (2019–present)
- Omari Crawford, HD-84 (2023–2025)
- Terry Cummings, HD-39 (2023–present)
- Viola Davis, HD-87 (2019–present)
- Demetrius Douglas, HD-78 (2013–present)
- Saira Draper, HD-90 (2023–present)
- Karla Drenner, HD-85 (2013–present), HD-86 (2005–2013), HD-57 (2003–2005), HD-66 (2001–2003)
- Becky Evans, HD-89 (2023–2025), HD-83 (2019–2023)
- Stacey Evans, HD-57 (2021–present), HD-52 (2011–2017)
- Gloria Frazier, HD-126 (2013–2025), HD-123 (2007–2013)
- Spencer Frye, HD-122 (2023–present), HD-118 (2013–2023)
- Carl Gilliard, HD-162 (2016–present)
- Lynn Gladney, HD-130 (2023–2026)
- Lydia Glaize, HD-67 (2023–present)
- Sharon Henderson, HD-113 (2021–present)
- Scott Holcomb, HD-81 (2011–2025)
- Betsy Holland, HD-54 (2019–present)
- El-Mahdi Holly, HD-116 (2022–present), HD-111 (2019–2022)
- Karlton Howard, HD-129 (2023–present)
- Carolyn Hugley, HD-141 (2023–present), HD-136 (2013–2023), HD-133 (2005–2013), HD-113 (2003–2005), HD-133 (1993–2003)
- Shelly Hutchinson, HD-106 (2023–2025), HD-107 (2019–2023)
- Derrick Jackson, HD-68 (2023–present), HD-64 (2017–2023)
- Edna Jackson, HD-165 (2021–present)
- Mack Jackson, HD-128 (2013–present), HD-142 (2009–2013)
- Sheila Jones, HD-60 (2023–present), HD-53 (2013–2023), HD-44 (2005–2013)
- Dar'shun Kendrick, HD-95 (2023–present), HD-93 (2013–2023), HD-94 (2011–2013)
- Gregg Kennard, HD-101 (2023–2025), HD-102 (2019–2023)
- Regina Lewis-Ward, HD-115 (2023–present), HD-109 (2021–2023)
- Marvin Lim, HD-98 (2023–present), HD-99 (2021–2023)
- Karen Lupton, HD-83 (2023–present)
- Pedro Marin, HD-96 (2005–2025), HD-66 (2003–2005)
- Dewey McClain, HD-109 (2023–present)
- Tanya F. Miller, HD-62 (2023–present)
- Billy Mitchell, HD-88 (2003–present)
- Angela Moore, HD-91 (2021–present)
- Farooq Mughal, HD-105 (2023–2025)
- Yasmin Neal, HD-79 (2011–present)
- Gabe Okoye, HD-102 (2017–present)
- Phil Olaleye, HD-59 (2023–present)
- Mary Margaret Oliver, HD-82 (2003–2025)
- Esther Panitch, HD-51 (2023–present)
- Miriam Paris, HD-142 (2017–present)
- Sam Park, HD-107 (2017–present)
- Brian Prince, HD-132 (2023–present)
- Tremaine Teddy Reese, HD-140 (2023–present)
- Shea Roberts, HD-52 (2021–present)
- Ruwa Romman, HD-97 (2023–present)
- David Sampson, HD-153 (2023–present)
- Kim Schofield, HD-63 (2017–present)
- Sandra Scott, HD-76 (2011–present)
- Dexter Sharper, HD-177 (2013–2026)
- Michael Smith, HD-41 (2013–present)
- Patty Marie Stinson, HD-150 (2013–present)
- Doug Stoner, HD-40 (2023–2025)
- Rhonda Taylor, HD-92 (2021–present)
- Mandisha Thomas, HD-65 (2021–2025)
- Long Tran, HD-80 (2023–present)
- Anne Allen Westbrook, HD-163 (2023–present)
- David Wilkerson, HD-38 (2011–present)
- Al Williams, HD-168 (2003–present)
- Mary Frances Williams, HD-37 (2019–present)
- Inga Willis, HD-55 (2023–present)

===== Hawaii House of Representatives =====
- Trish La Chica, HD-37 (2023–present)
- Daniel Holt, HD-28 (2022–2026), HD-29 (2016–2022)
- Kirstin Kahaloa, HD-6 (2022–present)
- Jeanné Kapela, HD-5 (2020–present)
- Darius Kila, HD-44 (2022–present)
- Mahina Poepoe, HD-13 (2022–present)
- Adrian Tam, HD-22 (2020–present)

===== Idaho House of Representatives =====
- Chris Mathias, LD-19 seat B (2020–present)
- Lauren Necochea, LD-19 seat A (2019–2024), chair of the Idaho Democratic Party (2022–present)
- Ilana Rubel, LD-18 seat A (2014–present), minority leader (2019–present)

===== Illinois House of Representatives =====
- Kam Buckner, HD-26 (2019–present)
- Sharon Chung, HD-91 (2023–present)
- Kimberly du Buclet, HD-5 (2023–present)
- La Shawn Ford, HD-8 (2007–present)
- Jehan Gordon-Booth, HD-92 (2009–present), speaker pro tempore (2021–2025)
- Elizabeth Hernandez, HD-2 (2023–present), HD-24 (2007–2023), chair of the Illinois Democratic Party (2022–present)
- Hoan Huynh, HD-13 (2023–present)
- Theresa Mah, HD-24 (2023–present)
- Bob Morgan, HD-58 (2019–present)
- Chris Welch, HD-7 (2013–present), speaker (2021–present)
- Maurice West, HD-67 (2019–present)

===== Indiana House of Representatives =====
- John L. Bartlett, HD-95 (2007–present)
- Earl Harris Jr., HD-2 (2016–present)
- Ragen Hatcher, HD-3 (2018–present)
- Carolyn Jackson, HD-1 (2018–present)
- Renee Pack, HD-92 (2020–present)
- Tonya Pfaff, HD-43 (2018–present)
- Greg Porter, HD-96 (1992–present)
- Cherrish Pryor, HD-94 (2008–present)
- Robin Shackleford, HD-98 (2012–present)
- Vernon Smith, HD-14 (1990–present)
- Vanessa Summers, HD-99 (1991–present)

===== Iowa House of Representatives =====
- Ako Abdul-Samad, HD-34 (2007–2025)
- Jennifer Konfrst, HD-32 (2019–present), minority leader (2021–2025)
- Megan Srinivas, HD-30 (2023–present)
- Adam Zabner, HD-90 (2023–present)

===== Kansas House of Representatives =====
- Barbara Ballard, HD-44 (1993–present)
- Christina Haswood, HD-10 (2021–2025)
- Vic Miller, HD-58 (1979–2025)
- Mari-Lynn Poskin, HD-20 (2021–present)
- Brandon Woodard, HD-108 (2019–present)

===== Kentucky House of Representatives =====
- Nima Kulkarni, HD-40 (2019–present)

===== Louisiana House of Representatives =====
- Delisha Boyd, HD-102 (2021–present)
- Kyle Green, HD-83 (2020–present)
- Mandie Landry, HD-91 (2020–present)
- Ed Larvadain, HD-26 (2019–present)

===== Maine House of Representatives =====
- Michael F. Brennan, HD-115 (2022–present), HD-36 (2018–2022), HD-37 (1992–2000)
- Kristen Cloutier, HD-94 (2018–2025)
- Deqa Dhalac, HD-120 (2022–present)
- Laurie Osher, HD-25 (2022–present), HD-123 (2020–2022)
- Rachel Talbot Ross, HD-118 (2016–2024), speaker (2022–2024)
- Maureen Terry, HD-108 (2016–2024), majority leader (2022–2024)

===== Maryland House of Delegates =====
- Adrian Boafo, LD-23 (2023–present)
- Adrienne A. Jones, LD-10 (1997–present), speaker (2019–2025)
- Dana Jones, HD-30A (2020–present)
- Jazz Lewis, LD-24 (2017–2026)
- Robbyn Lewis, LD-46 (2017–present)
- Jeffrie Long Jr., HD-27B (2023–present)
- Joseline Peña-Melnyk, LD-21 (2007–present)
- Andrew Pruski, HD-33A (2023–present)
- Malcolm Ruff, LD-41 (2023–present)
- Lily Qi, LD-15 (2019–present)
- Sheree Sample-Hughes, HD-37A (2015–present)
- Stephanie M. Smith, LD-45 (2019–present)
- Kris Valderrama, LD-26 (2007–present)
- Nicole A. Williams, LD-22 (2019–present)
- Jheanelle Wilkins, LD-20 (2017–present)
- Teresa Saavedra Woorman, LD-16 (2024–present)

===== Massachusetts House of Representatives =====
- John Barrett, Berkshire district 1 (2017–present)
- Kate Donaghue, Worcester district 19 (2023–present)
- Tricia Farley-Bouvier, Berkshire district 2 (2011–present)
- Dylan Fernandes, Barnstable, Dukes and Nantucket district (2017–2025)
- Ron Mariano, Norfolk district 3 (1991–present), speaker (2020–present)
- Aaron Michlewitz, Suffolk district 3 (2009–present)
- William "Smitty" Pignatelli, Berkshire district 4 (2003–2025)
- Andy Vargas, Essex district 3 (2017–present)
- Tommy Vitolo, Norfolk district 15 (2019–present)
- Christopher Worrell, Suffolk district 5 (2023–present)

===== Michigan House of Representatives =====
- Noah Arbit, HD-20 (2023–present)
- Julie Brixie, HD-73 (2023–present), HD-69 (2019–2023)
- Betsy Coffia, HD-103 (2023–present)
- Carol Glanville, HD-84 (2023–present), HD-74 (2021–2022)
- Rachel Hood, HD-81 (2023–2024), HD-76 (2019–2022)
- Kara Hope, HD-74 (2023–present), HD-67 (2019–2023)
- Jasper Martus, HD-69 (2023–present)
- Denise Mentzer, HD-61 (2023–present)
- Jason Morgan, HD-23 (2023–present)
- Ranjeev Puri, HD-24 (2023–present), HD-21 (2021–2022)
- Carrie Rheingans, HD-47 (2023–present)
- Phil Skaggs, HD-80 (2023–present)
- Joe Tate, HD-10 (2019–present), speaker
- Jimmie Wilson Jr., HD-32 (2023–present)

===== Minnesota House of Representatives =====
- Brion Curran, HD-36B (2023–present)
- Leigh Finke, HD-66A (2023–present)
- Mike Freiberg, HD-45B (2013–present)
- Kim Hicks, HD-25A (2023–present)
- Melissa Hortman, HD-34B (2005–2025), speaker
- Michael Howard, HD-51A (2019–present)
- Liish Kozlowski, HD-8B (2023–present)
- Fue Lee, HD-59A (2017–present)
- Jamie Long, HD-61B (2019–present), majority leader
- María Isa Pérez-Vega, HD-65B (2023–present)
- Zack Stephenson, HD-35A (2019–present)
- Dan Wolgamott, HD-14B (2019–present), speaker pro tempore (2023–2025)
- Jay Xiong, HD-67B (2019–present)

===== Mississippi House of Representatives =====
- Earle S. Banks, HD-67 (1993–present)
- Chris Bell, HD-65 (2016–present)
- Lawrence Blackmon, HD-57 (2024–present)
- Tamarra Butler-Washington, HD-69 (2024–present)
- Justis Gibbs, HD-72 (2024–present)
- Robert Johnson III, HD-94 (2004–present), minority leader
- Kabir Karriem, HD-41 (2016–present)
- Zakiya Summers, HD-68 (2020–present)
- Cheikh Taylor, HD-38 (2017–present), chair of the Mississippi Democratic Party (2023–present)

===== Missouri House of Representatives =====
- Ashley Aune, HD-14 (2021–present)
- Betsy Fogle, HD-135 (2021–present)
- Keri Ingle, HD-35 (2019–present)
- Crystal Quade, HD-132 (2017–2025), minority leader

===== Montana House of Representatives =====
- Zooey Zephyr, HD-100 (2023–2025)

===== Nevada Assembly =====
- Reuben D'Silva, AD-28 (2022–present)
- Daniele Monroe-Moreno, AD-1 (2016–present), chair of the Nevada Democratic Party (2023–present)
- Erica Mosca, AD-14 (2022–present)
- Duy Nguyen, AD-8 (2022–present)
- Steve Yeager, AD-9 (2013–present), speaker

===== New Hampshire House of Representatives =====
- Luz Bay, Strafford 21 (2022–present)
- Latha Mangipudi, Hillsborough 35 (2013–2024)
- David Paige, Carroll 1 (2022–present)
- Linda Tanner, Sullivan 5 (2022–present), Sullivan 9 (2012–2014, 2016–2022)
- Matthew Wilhelm, Hillsborough 42 (2018–present), minority leader
- Dan Wolf, Merrimack 5 (2016–2024) (Republican)

===== New Jersey Assembly =====
- Rosy Bagolie, LD-27 (2024–present)
- Alixon Collazos-Gill, LD-27 (2024–present)
- Herb Conaway, LD-7 (1998–2025)
- Craig Coughlin, LD-19 (2010–present), speaker
- Joseph Danielsen, LD-17 (2014–present)
- Wayne DeAngelo, LD-14 (2008–present)
- Tennille McCoy, LD-14 (2024–present)
- Luanne Peterpaul, LD-11 (2024–present)
- Verlina Reynolds-Jackson, LD-15 (2018–present)
- Shavonda E. Sumter, LD-35 (2012–2026)
- Anthony Verrelli, LD-15 (2018–present)

===== New Mexico House of Representatives =====
- Javier Martínez, HD-11 (2015–present), speaker
- Reena Szczepanski, HD-47 (2023–present)

===== New York Assembly =====
- George Alvarez, AD-78 (2023–present)
- Harry Bronson, AD-138 (2011–present)
- Sarah Clark, AD-136 (2020–present)
- Jeffrey Dinowitz, AD-81 (1994–present)
- Deborah J. Glick, AD-66 (1991–present)
- Carl Heastie, AD-83 (2001–present), speaker
- Rodneyse Bichotte Hermelyn, AD-42 (2015–present)
- Chantel Jackson, AD-79 (2021–present)
- Ron Kim, AD-40 (2013–present)
- Donna Lupardo, AD-123 (2005–present)
- Crystal Peoples-Stokes, AD-141 (2003–present), majority leader (2018–present)
- Steven Raga, AD-30 (2023–present)
- Jenifer Rajkumar, AD-38 (2021–present)
- Tony Simone, AD-75 (2023–present)
- Michaelle C. Solages, AD-22 (2013–present), deputy majority leader (2021–present)
- Yudelka Tapia, AD-86 (2021–present)
- David Weprin, AD-24 (2010–present)
- Stefani Zinerman, AD-56 (2021–present)

===== North Carolina House of Representatives =====
- Eric Ager, HD-114 (2023–present)
- Vernetta Alston, HD-29 (2021–present)
- John Autry, HD-100 (2017–2025)
- Amber Baker, HD-72 (2021–present)
- Cynthia Ball, HD-49 (2017–present)
- Mary Gardner Belk, HD-88 (2017–present)
- Cecil Brockman, HD-60 (2015–2025)
- Gloristine Brown, HD-8 (2023–present)
- Kanika Brown, HD-71 (2023–present)
- Terry Brown, HD-92 (2021–present)
- Allen Buansi, HD-56 (2022–present)
- Laura Budd, HD-103 (2023–present)
- Deb Butler, HD-18 (2017–present)
- Becky Carney, HD-102 (2003–present)
- Maria Cervania, HD-41 (2023–present)
- Sarah Crawford, HD-66 (2023–present)
- Allison Dahle, HD-11 (2019–present)
- Terence Everitt, HD-35 (2021–2025)
- Rosa Gill, HD-33 (2009–2025)
- Julie von Haefen, HD-36 (2019–present)
- Wesley Harris, HD-105 (2019–2025), 2024 Democratic nominee for North Carolina state treasurer
- Pricey Harrison, HD-61 (2019–present), HD-57 (2005–2019)
- Frances Jackson, HD-45 (2023–present)
- Ray Jeffers, HD-2 (2023–present)
- Joe John, HD-40 (2017–2025)
- Abe Jones, HD-38 (2021–present)
- Ya Liu, HD-21 (2023–present)
- Brandon Lofton, HD-104 (2019–present)
- Carolyn Logan, HD-101 (2019–present)
- Tim Longest, HD-34 (2023–present)
- Marvin W. Lucas, HD-42 (2001–2025)
- Nasif Majeed, HD-99 (2021–present)
- Marcia Morey, HD-30 (2017–present)
- Garland E. Pierce, HD-48 (2005–present)
- Lindsey Prather, HD-115 (2023–present)
- Renee Price, HD-50 (2023–present)
- Amos Quick, HD-58 (2017–present)
- Robert T. Reives II, HD-54 (2014–present), minority leader (2021–present)
- James Roberson, HD-39 (2021–present)
- Caleb Rudow, HD-116 (2023–2025), HD-114 (2022–2023)
- Charles Smith, HD-44 (2023–present)
- Diamond Staton-Williams, HD-73 (2023–2025)
- Shelly Willingham, HD-23 (2015–present)
- Michael H. Wray, HD-27 (2005–2025)

===== North Dakota House of Representatives =====
- Joshua Boschee, HD-44 (2012–2024)
- Jayme Davis, HD-9A (2022–2024)
- Lisa Finley-DeVille, HD-4A (2022–present)
- Zac Ista, HD-43 (2020–present), minority leader (2023–present)

===== Northern Mariana Islands House of Representatives =====
- Diego Camacho, HD-1 (2023–present)
- Vicente Camacho, HD-3 (2021–2025)
- Manny Castro, HD-2 (2023–2025) (Independent)
- Ed Propst, HD-1 (2015–2025), majority leader
- Denita Yangetmai, HD-3 (2021–present)

===== Ohio House of Representatives =====
- Dani Isaacsohn, HD-24 (2023–present)
- Dontavius Jarrells, HD-1 (2023–present), HD-25 (2021–2022)
- Allison Russo, HD-7 (2019–present), minority leader
- Anita Somani, HD-11 (2023–2025)
- Cecil Thomas, HD-25 (2023–present)

===== Oklahoma House of Representatives =====
- Arturo Alonso, HD-89 (2022–present)
- Regina Goodwin, HD-73 (2015–2024), member-elect of the Oklahoma Senate
- Cyndi Munson, HD-85 (2015–present), minority leader (2022–present)
- Amanda Swope, HD-71 (2022–2025)

===== Oregon House of Representatives =====
- Janelle Bynum, HD-39 (2017–2025), 2024 Democratic nominee for OR-05
- Travis Nelson, HD-44 (2022–present)
- Lisa Reynolds, HD-34 (2023–2024)
- Thuy Tran, HD-45 (2023–present)

===== Pennsylvania House of Representatives =====
- Anthony A. Bellmon, HD-203 (2023–present)
- Jessica Benham, HD-36 (2021–present)
- Matthew Bradford, HD-70 (2009–present), majority leader (2023–present)
- Amen Brown, HD-10 (2023–present), HD-190 (2021–2022)
- Danilo Burgos, HD-197 (2019–present)
- Andre Carroll, HD-201 (2024–present)
- Morgan Cephas, HD-192 (2017–present)
- Melissa Cerrato, HD-151 (2023–present)
- Gina Curry, HD-164 (2021–present)
- Justin C. Fleming, HD-105 (2023–present)
- Dan Frankel, HD-23 (1999–present)
- Robert L. Freeman, HD-136 (1983–1994, 1999–present)
- Pat Gallagher, HD-173 (2023–present)
- Nancy Guenst, HD-152 (2021–present)
- Jordan A. Harris, HD-186 (2013–present)
- Joe Hohenstein, HD-177 (2019–present)
- Malcolm Kenyatta, HD-181 (2019–present)
- Tarik Khan, HD-194 (2023–present)
- Patty Kim, HD-103 (2013–2025)
- Emily Kinkead, HD-20 (2021–present)
- Rick Krajewski, HD-188 (2021–present)
- Dave Madsen, HD-104 (2023–present)
- Steve Malagari, HD-53 (2019–present)
- Joanna McClinton, HD-191 (2015–present), speaker
- Ed Neilson, HD-174 (2015–present)
- Jennifer O'Mara, HD-165 (2019–present)
- Danielle Friel Otten, HD-155 (2019–present)
- Darisha Parker, HD-198 (2020–present)
- Eddie Day Pashinski, HD-121 (2007–present)
- Lindsay Powell, HD-21 (2023–present)
- Abigail Salisbury, HD-34 (2023–present)
- Michael Schlossberg, HD-132 (2013–present)
- Peter Schweyer, HD-134 (2015–present)
- Joshua Siegel, HD-22 (2023–2025)
- Ismail Smith-Wade-El, HD-49 (2022–present)
- Jared Solomon, HD-202 (2017–present)
- Paul Takac, HD-82 (2023–present)
- Arvind Venkat, HD-30 (2023–present)
- Ben Waxman, HD-182 (2023–present)
- Joe Webster, HD-150 (2019–present)

===== Puerto Rico House of Representatives =====
- Jesús Manuel Ortiz, at-large (2017–2025) (Popular Democratic Party)

===== Rhode Island House of Representatives =====
- Christopher Blazejewski, HD-2 (2011–present), majority leader (2021–2026)
- Joe Shekarchi, HD-23 (2013–present), speaker (2021–2026)
- June Speakman, HD-68 (2019–present)

===== South Carolina House of Representatives =====
- Heather Bauer, HD-75 (2022–present)
- Bill Clyburn, HD-82 (1995–present)
- Gilda Cobb-Hunter, HD-95 (1992–present)
- Wendell Gilliard, HD-111 (2009–present)
- Jermaine Johnson, HD-70 (2022–2024), HD-80 (2020–2022)
- John Richard C. King, HD-49 (2009–present)
- Annie McDaniel, HD-41 (2018–present)
- JA Moore, HD-15 (2018–present)
- Rosalyn Henderson Myers, HD-31 (2017–present)
- Tiffany Spann-Wilder, HD-109 (2024–present)
- Ivory Torrey Thigpen, HD-79 (2016–2024)

===== South Dakota House of Representatives =====
- Kameron Nelson, HD-10 (2023–2025)

===== Tennessee House of Representatives =====
- Karen Camper, HD-87 (2008–present), minority leader
- Gloria Johnson, HD-13 (2019–2023), HD-90 (2023–present), 2024 Democratic nominee for U.S. Senate
- Justin Jones, HD-52 (2023–present)
- Harold M. Love Jr., HD-58 (2013–present), assistant minority leader
- Sam McKenzie, HD-15 (2021–present)
- Antonio Parkinson, HD-89 (2011–present)
- Justin J. Pearson, HD-86 (2023–present)

===== Texas House of Representatives =====
- Alma Allen, HD-131 (2005–present)
- Rafael Anchía, HD-103 (2005–present)
- Diego Bernal, HD-123 (2015–present)
- Salman Bhojani, HD-92 (2023–present)
- Rhetta Bowers, HD-113 (2019–present)
- John Bryant, HD-114 (2023–present), U.S. representative from TX-05 (1983–1997)
- John Bucy III, HD-136 (2019–present)
- Elizabeth Campos, HD-119 (2021–present)
- Nicole Collier, HD-95 (2013–present)
- Philip Cortez, HD-117 (2013–2015, 2017–present)
- Sheryl Cole, HD-46 (2019–present)
- Yvonne Davis, HD-111 (1993–present)
- Harold Dutton Jr., HD-142 (1985–present)
- Trey Martinez Fischer, HD-116 (2001–2017, 2019–present), minority leader (2023–2025)
- Lulu Flores, HD-51 (2023–present)
- Erin Gamez, HD-38 (2022–present)
- Josey Garcia, HD-124 (2023–present)
- Barbara Gervin-Hawkins, HD-120 (2017–present)
- Jessica González, HD-104 (2019–present)
- Mary González, HD-75 (2013–present)
- Vikki Goodwin, HD-47 (2019–present)
- Ana Hernandez, HD-143 (2005–present)
- Gina Hinojosa, HD-49 (2017–present)
- Donna Howard, HD-48 (2006–present)
- Ann Johnson, HD-134 (2021–present)
- Jarvis Johnson, HD-139 (2016–2025)
- Julie Johnson, HD-115 (2019–2025), 2024 Democratic nominee for TX-32
- Jolanda Jones, HD-147 (2022–present)
- Venton Jones, HD-100 (2023–present)
- Suleman Lalani, HD-76 (2023–present)
- Ray Lopez, HD-125 (2019–present)
- Christian Manuel, HD-22 (2023–present)
- Armando Martinez, HD-39 (2005–present)
- Terry Meza, HD-105 (2019–present)
- Joe Moody, HD-117 (2009–2011, 2013–present)
- Christina Morales, HD-145 (2019–present)
- Eddie Morales, HD-74 (2021–present)
- Sergio Muñoz, HD-36 (2011–present)
- Victoria Neave, HD-107 (2017–2025)
- Claudia Ordaz, HD-79 (2023–present), HD-76 (2021–2023)
- Evelina Ortega, HD-77 (2017–2025)
- Mary Ann Perez, HD-144 (2017–present, 2013–2015)
- Mihaela Plesa, HD-70 (2023–present)
- Ana-Maria Ramos, HD-102 (2019–present)
- Richard Raymond, HD-42 (2001–present), HD-44 (1993–1999)
- Ron Reynolds, HD-27 (2011–present)
- Ramon Romero Jr., HD-90 (2015–present)
- Toni Rose, HD-110 (2013–present)
- Jon Rosenthal, HD-135 (2019–present)
- Carl O. Sherman, HD-109 (2019–2025)
- James Talarico, HD-50 (2023–present)
- Senfronia Thompson, HD-89 (1983–present), HD-141 (1973–1983)
- Chris Turner, HD-101 (2013–present), minority leader (2017–2023), HD-96 (2009–2011)
- Hubert Vo, HD-149 (2005–present)
- Armando Walle, HD-140 (2009–present)
- Gene Wu, HD-137 (2013–present)
- Erin Zwiener, HD-45 (2019–present)

===== Utah House of Representatives =====
- Brian King, HD-23 (2023–2024), HD-28 (2009–2023), 2024 candidate for governor
- Carol Spackman Moss, HD-34 (2023–present), HD-37 (2001–2023)
- Angela Romero, HD-25 (2023–present), HD-26 (2013–2023), minority leader

===== Vermont House of Representatives =====
- Mike Mrowicki, Windham District 4 (2009–present)

===== Virginia House of Delegates =====
- Bonita Anthony, HD-92 (2024–present)
- Alex Askew, HD-95 (2024–present), HD-85 (2020–2022)
- Katrina Callsen, HD-54 (2024–present)
- Joshua G. Cole, HD-65 (2024–present), HD-28 (2020–2022)
- Michael Feggans, HD-97 (2024–present)
- Rozia Henson, HD-19 (2024–present)
- Charniele Herring, HD-4 (2024–present), HD-46 (2009–2024), Majority Leader
- Candi King, HD-23 (2024–2026), HD-2 (2021–2024)
- Amy Laufer, HD-55 (2024–present)
- Alfonso H. Lopez, HD-3 (2024–present), HD-49 (2012–2024)
- Michelle Maldonado, HD-20 (2024–2026), HD-50 (2022–2024)
- Adele McClure, HD-2 (2024–present)
- Marcia Price, HD-85 (2024–present), HD-95 (2016–2024)
- Don Scott, HD-88 (2020–present), speaker
- Briana Sewell, HD-25 (2024–present), HD-51 (2022–2024)
- Shelly Simonds, HD-70 (2024–present), HD-94 (2020–2024)
- Kannan Srinivasan, HD-26 (2024–2025)
- Kathy Tran, HD-18 (2024–present), HD-42 (2018–2024)
- Jeion Ward, HD-87 (2024–present), HD-92 (2004–2024)

===== Washington House of Representatives =====
- April Berg, LD-44 position 2 (2021–present)
- Brandy Donaghy, LD-44 position 1 (2021–present)
- Debra Entenman, LD-47 position 1 (2019–present)
- David Hackney, LD-11 position 1 (2021–present)
- Laurie Jinkins, LD-27 position 1 (2011–present), speaker (2020–present)
- Melanie Morgan, LD-29 position 1 (2019–present)
- Julia Reed, LD-36 position 1 (2023–present)
- Kristine Reeves, LD-30 position 2 (2017–2019, 2023–present)
- Vandana Slatter, LD-48 position 1 (2017–2025)
- Chipalo Street, LD-37 position 2 (2023–present)
- Jamila Taylor, LD-30 position 1 (2021–present)

===== West Virginia House of Delegates =====
- Joey Garcia, HD-76 (2022–2024), HD-50 (2020–2022)
- Mike Pushkin, HD-54 (2014–present), chair of the West Virginia Democratic Party (2022–present)

===== Wisconsin State Assembly =====
- Greta Neubauer, AD-66 (2018–present), minority leader
- Lisa Subeck, AD-78 (2015–2025)

===== Wyoming House of Representatives =====
- Liz Storer, HD-23 (2023–present)
- Mike Yin, HD-16 (2019–present), minority leader

==== Former ====
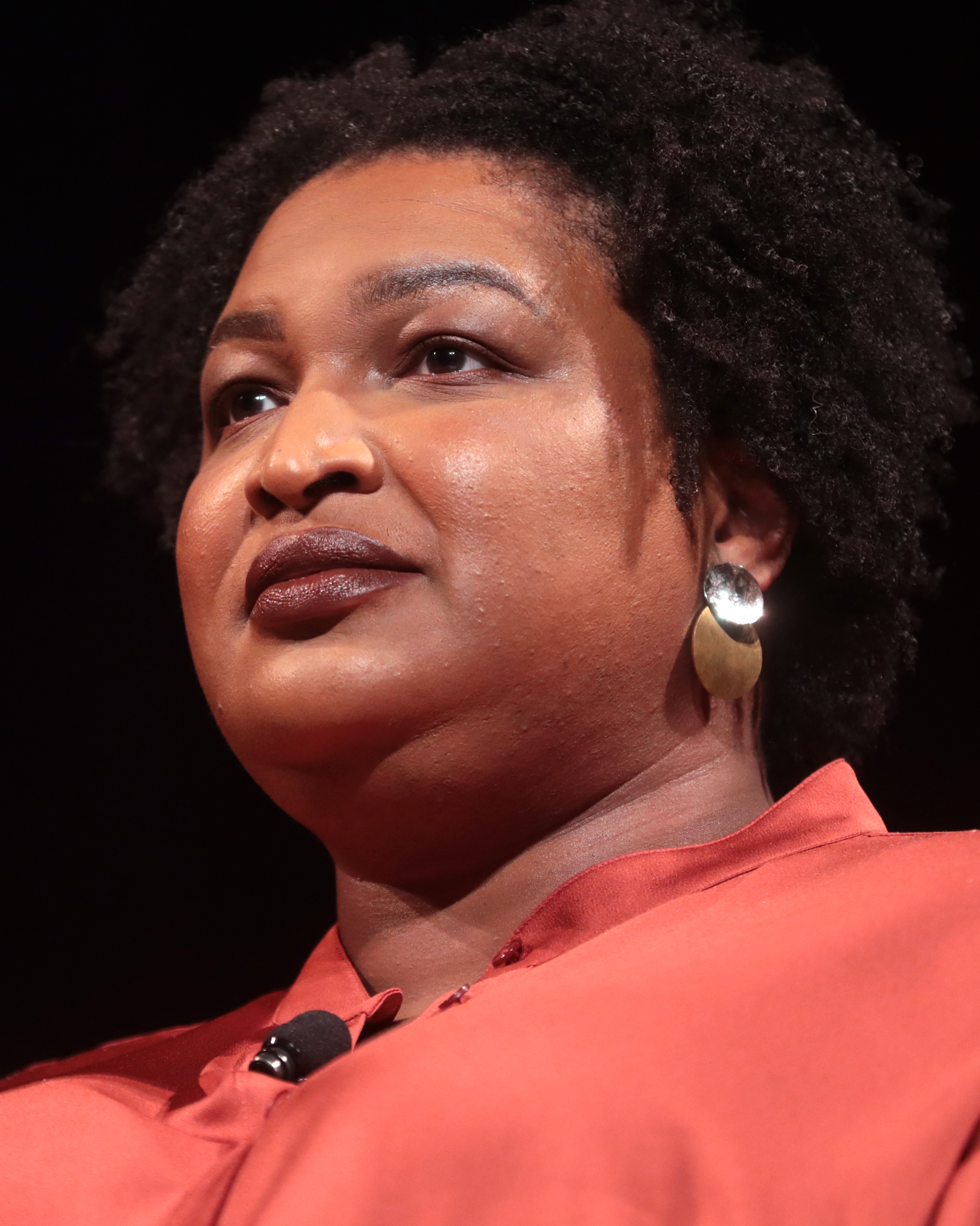
Stacey Abrams

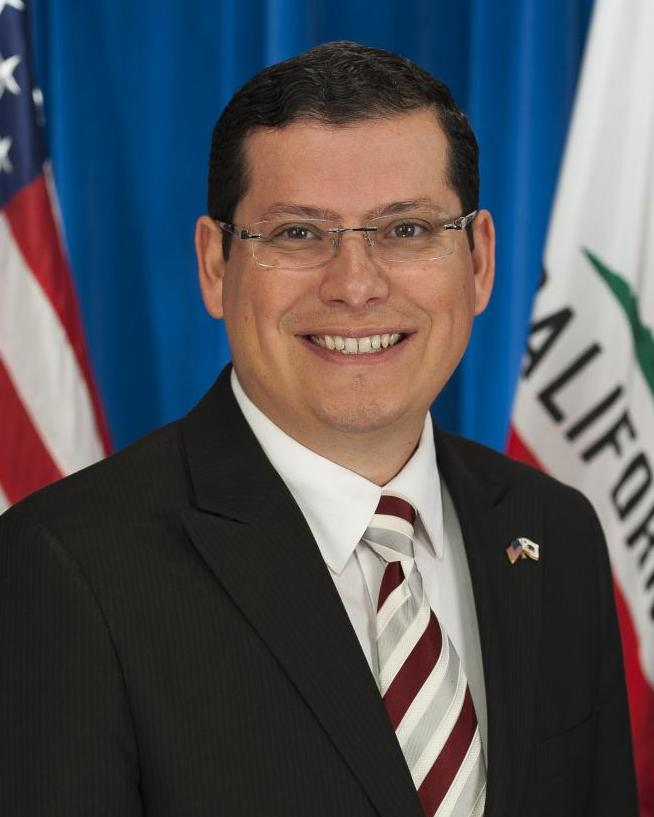
Rudy Salas

===== Alabama House of Representatives =====
- Earl Hilliard Jr., HD-60 (2006–2010)

===== Alaska House of Representatives =====
- Ethan Berkowitz, HD-13 (1997–2003), HD-26 (2003–2007), minority leader (1999–2006), mayor of Anchorage, Alaska (2015–2020)
- Kay Brown, HD-15 (1987–1996)
- Mike Davis, HD-19 (1982–1990)
- Charles Degnan, HD-20 (1971–1975)
- Les Gara, HD-23 (2003–2019)
- David Guttenberg, HD-8 (2003–2013), HD-38 (2013–2015), HD-4 (2015–2019)
- Mike Navarre, HD-9 (1985–1996)
- Jim Nordlund, HD-11 (1993–1994)
- Sally Smith, HD-20 (1977–1983)

===== American Samoa House of Representatives =====
- Andra Samoa, HD-13 (2019–2023)

===== Arizona House of Representatives =====
- Doug Coleman, LD-16 (2013–2019) (Republican)
- Deb Gullett, LD-11 (2003–2005), LD-18 (2001–2003) (Republican)
- Pete Hershberger, LD-26 (2001–2008) (Republican)
- Joel John, LD-4 (2021–2023) (Republican)
- Steve May, LD-26 (1999–2003) (Republican)
- Athena Salman, LD-8 (2023–2024), LD-26 (2017–2023)
- Robin Shaw, LD-26 (1994–1998) (Republican)
- Roberta Voss, LD-19 (1997–2003) (Republican)

===== California Assembly =====
- Art Agnos, AD-16 (1976–1988), mayor of San Francisco (1988–1992)
- Lorena Gonzalez, AD-80 (2013–2022)
- Rudy Salas, AD-32 (2012–2022), 2024 Democratic candidate for CA-22
- Antonio Villaraigosa, AD-45 (1994–2000), speaker (1998–2000), mayor of Los Angeles, California (2005–2013)

===== Colorado House of Representatives =====
- Paul Rosenthal, HD-9 (2013–2019)
- Joe Salazar, HD-31 (2013–2019)

===== Florida House of Representatives =====
- Robert Asencio, HD-118 (2016–2018)
- Dorothy Bendross-Mindingall, HD-109 (2000–2009)
- John Cortes, HD-43 (2014–2020)
- Joe Geller, HD-100 (2014–2022)
- Omari Hardy, HD-88 (2020–2022)
- Sean Shaw, HD-61 (2016–2018)
- Carlos Guillermo Smith, HD-49 (2016–2020)
- Jennifer Webb, HD-69 (2018–2020)

===== Georgia House of Representatives =====
- Stacey Abrams, founder of Fair Fight Action, HD-89 (2007–2017), minority leader (2011–2017)

===== Hawaii House of Representatives =====
- Peter Apo, HD-20 (1982–1996)
- Stacelynn Kehaulani Eli, HD-43 (2018–2022)
- Heather Giugni, HD-33 (2012–2013)
- Kaniela Ing, HD-11 (2012–2018)
- Hermina Morita, HD-14 (1997–2011)

===== Illinois House of Representatives =====
- Yoni Pizer, HD-12 (2020)
- Litesa Wallace, HD-67 (2014–2019)

===== Maine House of Representatives =====
- Timothy Marks, HD-53 (2012–2014)

===== Maryland House of Delegates =====
- Eric Luedtke, LD-14 (2011–2023), majority leader (2019–2023)
- Heather Mizeur, LD-20 (2007–2015)

===== Massachusetts House of Representatives =====
- Paul A. Brodeur, Middlesex district 32 (2011–2019)
- Sherwood Guernsey, Berkshire district 2 (1983–1990)
- Nicholas Paleologos, Middlesex district 33 (1977–1991)

===== Michigan House of Representatives =====
- David Maturen, HD-63 (2015–2018) (Republican)
- Dave Pagel, HD-78 (2013–2019) (Republican)

===== Mississippi House of Representatives =====
- John Grisham, HD-7 (1983–1990)
- Kathy L. Sykes, HD-70 (2016–2020)

===== Missouri House of Representatives =====
- Maria Chappelle-Nadal, HD-86 (2019–2021)

===== Nevada Assembly =====
- Richard Perkins, AD-23 (1992–2006), speaker (2001–2006)

===== New Hampshire House of Representatives =====
- Raymond Buckley, Hillsborough 44 (1986–2004), chair of the New Hampshire Democratic Party (2007–present)
- William Marsh, Carroll 8 (2016–2022)

===== New Jersey Assembly =====
- Sadaf Jaffer, LD-16 (2022–2024)

===== New York Assembly =====
- Michael Blake, AD-79 (2015–2021), vice chair of the DNC (2017–2021)
- Roger L. Green, AD-57 (1981–2004, 2005–2006)
- Jerry Kremer, AD-20 (1966–1988)

===== North Carolina House of Representatives =====
- Kelly Alexander, HD-107 (2009–2024) (deceased)
- Ashton Clemmons, HD-57 (2019–2024)
- Raymond Smith Jr., HD-21 (2019–2023)
- Brian Turner, HD-116 (2015–2023)

===== North Dakota House of Representatives =====
- Ruth Buffalo, HD-27 (2018–2022)

===== Northern Mariana Islands House of Representatives =====
- Tina Sablan, HD-2 (2019–2023), HD-1 (2008–2010)

===== Oklahoma House of Representatives =====
- Cory T. Williams, HD-34 (2009–2019)

===== Pennsylvania House of Representatives =====
- Brian Sims, HD-182 (2013–2022)

===== South Carolina House of Representatives =====
- Jerry Govan Jr., HD-95 (1992–2002)
- Harold Mitchell Jr., HD-31 (2005–2017)
- Bakari Sellers, HD-90 (2006–2014)

===== Texas House of Representatives =====
- Glen Maxey, HD-51 (1991–2003)

===== Virginia House of Delegates =====
- Bobby Mathieson, HD-21 (2008–2010)
- David Ramadan, HD-87 (2012–2016) (Republican)
- David Toscano, HD-57 (2006–2020), minority leader (2011–2018)

===== Wisconsin State Assembly =====
- Sheehan Donoghue, AD-61 (1983–1985), AD-35 (1973–1983) (Republican)
- Stan Gruszynski, AD-71 (1985–1995)
- Margaret S. Lewis, AD-38 (1985–1991) (Republican)
- Susan Bowers Vergeront, AD-60 (1985–1995) (Republican)

===== Wyoming House of Representatives =====
- Joseph M. Barbuto, HD-48 (2009–2013), chair of the Wyoming Democratic Party (2017–present)

== Municipal, sub-state, and local officials ==
=== District attorneys ===
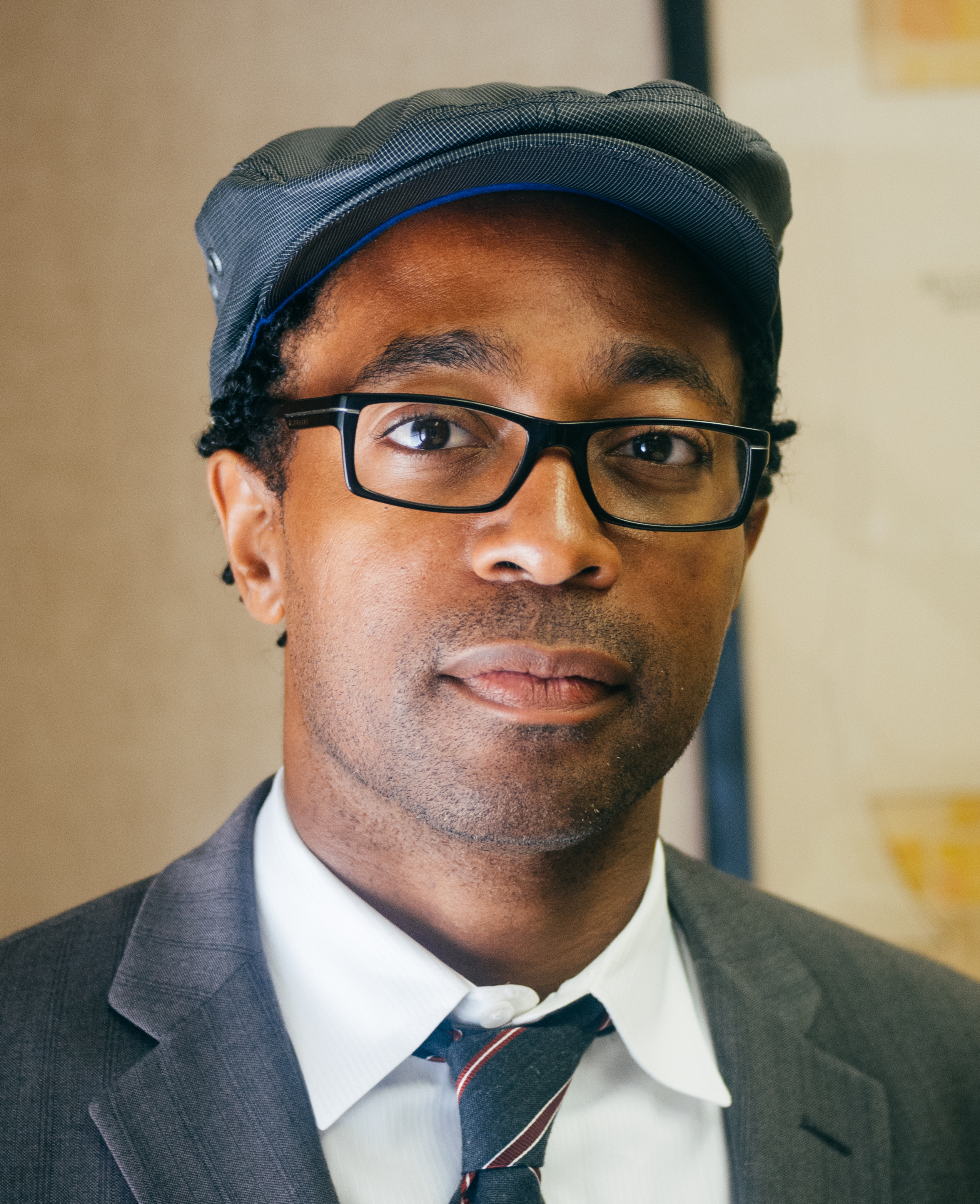
Wesley Bell

- Wesley Bell, prosecuting attorney of St. Louis County, Missouri (2019–2025), 2024 Democratic nominee for MO-01
- Aisha Braveboy, state's attorney of Prince George's County, Maryland (2018–2025)
- John Creuzot, district attorney of Dallas County, Texas (2018–present)
- Kim Foxx, Cook County state's attorney (2016–2024)
- George Gascón, Los Angeles County district attorney (2020–2024), San Francisco district attorney (2011–2019)
- Eric Gonzalez, Brooklyn district attorney (2016–present)
- Larry Krasner, district attorney of Philadelphia (2018–present)
- Christian Menefee, county attorney of Harris County, Texas (2021–2026)
- Rick Romley, county attorney of Maricopa County, Arizona (1989–2005, 2010) (Republican)
- Andrew H. Warren, state attorney for the 13th Judicial Circuit of Florida (2017–2022)

=== County officials ===
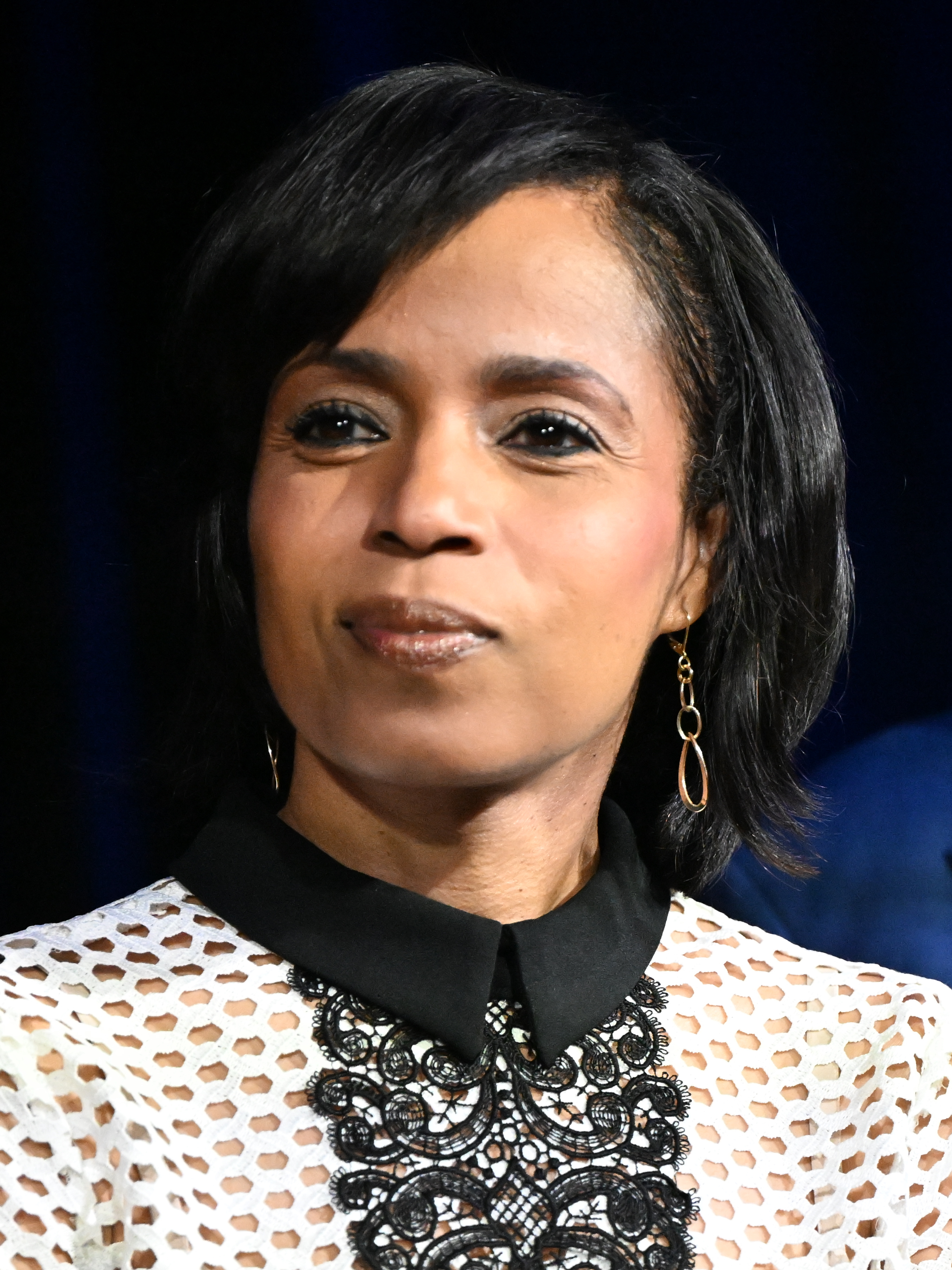
Angela Alsobrooks

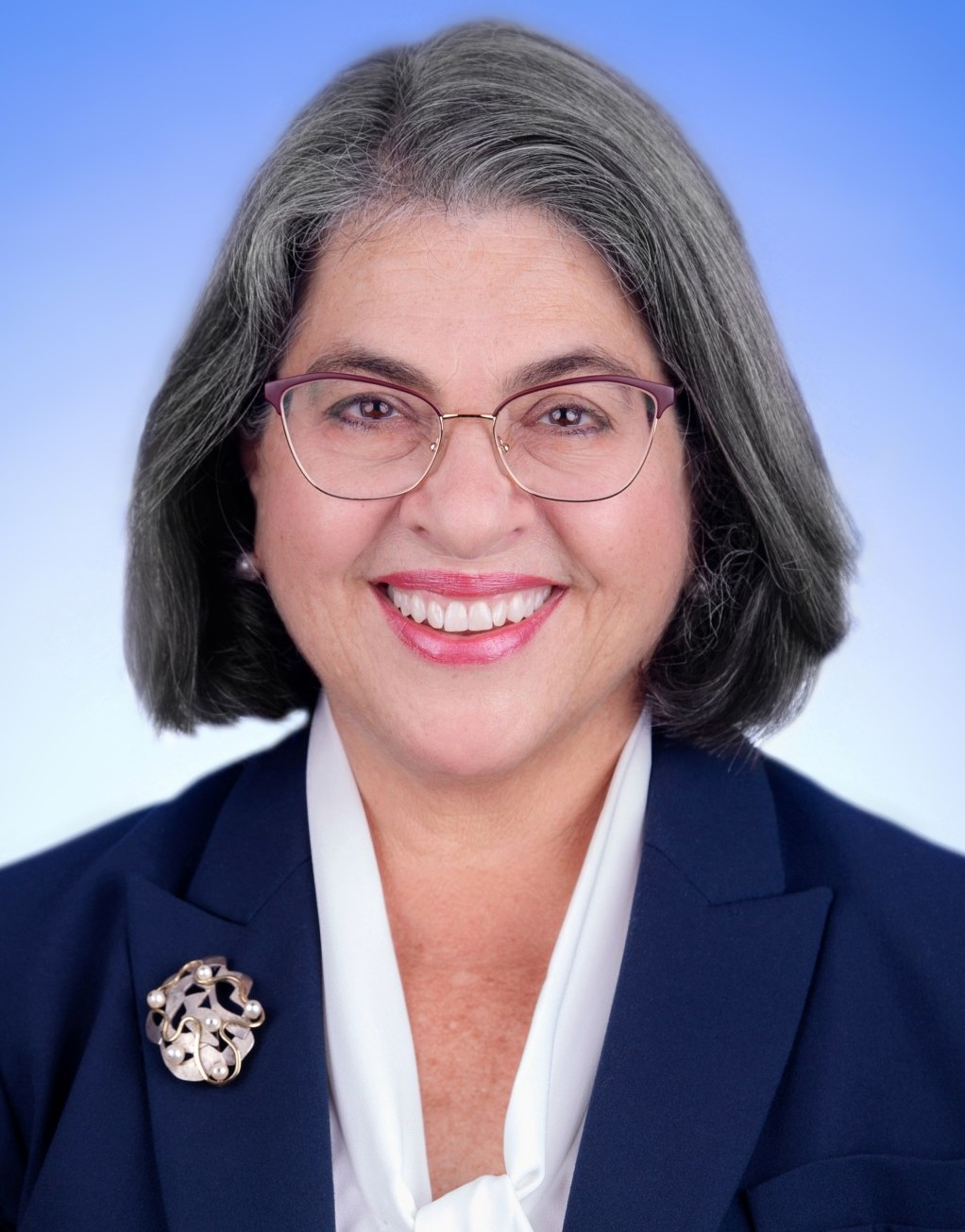
Daniella Levine Cava

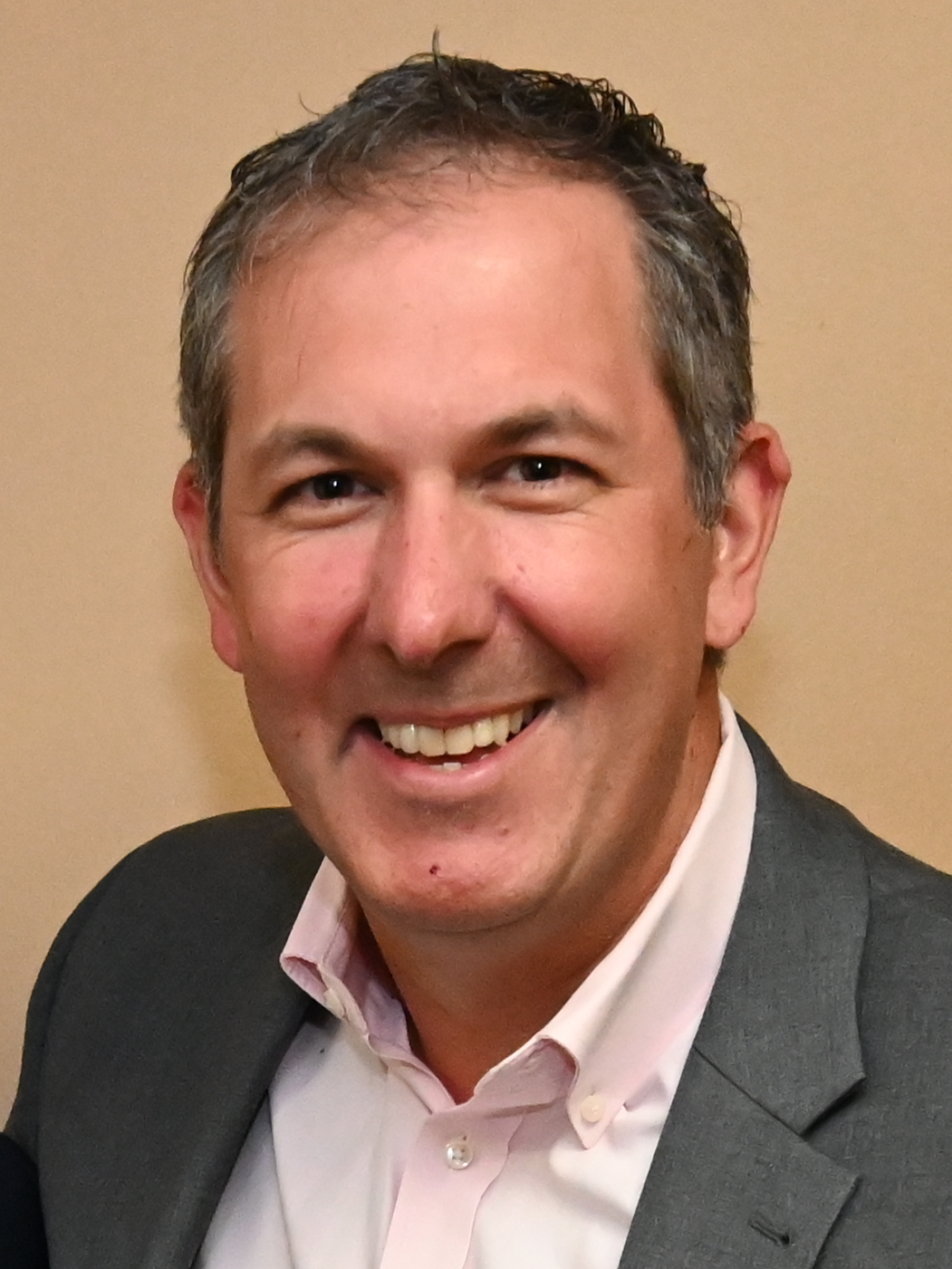
Johnny Olszewski

==== County-level executive officials ====
- Angela Alsobrooks, county executive of Prince George's County, Maryland (2018–2024), nominee for U.S. senator from Maryland in 2024
- Calvin Ball III, county executive of Howard County, Maryland (2018–present)
- Daniel R. Benson, Mercer County executive (2024–present)
- Jerry Cannon, sheriff of Kalkaska County, Michigan (1987–2004)
- Daniella Levine Cava, mayor of Miami-Dade County, Florida (2020–present)
- Gabriella Cázares-Kelly, recorder of Pima County, Arizona (2021–present)
- David Coulter, county executive of Oakland County, Michigan (2019–present)
- David Crowley, county executive of Milwaukee County, Wisconsin (2020–present)
- Joseph N. DiVincenzo Jr., Essex County executive (2003–present)
- Warren Evans, executive of Wayne County, Michigan (2015–present)
- Marc Elrich, county executive of Montgomery County, Maryland (2018–present)
- Abdul El-Sayed, director of the Department of Health, Human, and Veteran Services for Wayne County, Michigan (2023–2025)
- Anne Gannon, tax collector of Palm Beach County, Florida (2006–present)
- Lee Harris, mayor of Shelby County, Tennessee (2018–present)
- Sara Innamorato, county executive of Allegheny County, Pennsylvania (2024–present)
- George Latimer, county executive of Westchester County, New York (2018–2025) and 2024 Democratic nominee for NY-16
- Valerie McDonald-Roberts, Allegheny County recorder of deeds (2001–2008)
- Amy Mercado, property appraiser of Orange County, Florida (2021–present)
- Tom Nelson, county executive of Outagamie County, Wisconsin (2011–present)
- Corey O'Connor, Allegheny County controller (2022–2026)
- Johnny Olszewski, county executive of Baltimore County, Maryland (2018–2025) and 2024 Democratic nominee for MD-02
- Sam Page, county executive of St. Louis County, Missouri (2019–present)
- Barbara Sharief, mayor of Broward County, Florida (2016–2017, 2013–2014)
- Gregory Tony, sheriff of Broward County, Florida (2019–present)
- Jenny Wilson, mayor of Salt Lake County, Utah (2019–present)

==== County-level judicial officials ====
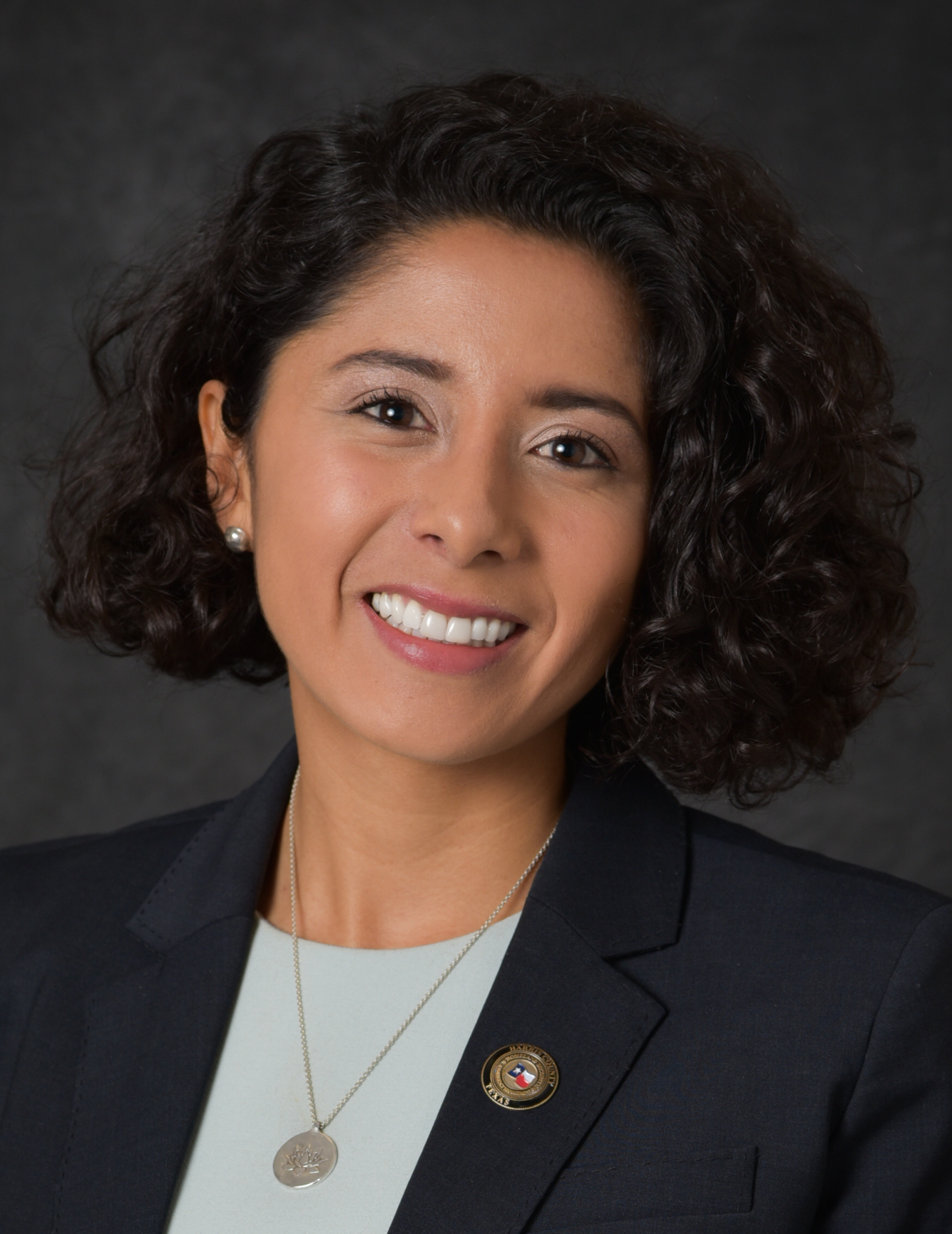
Lina Hidalgo

- Lina Hidalgo, county judge of Harris County, Texas (2019–present)
- Clay Jenkins, county judge of Dallas County, Texas (2011–present)
- Glen Whitley, county judge of Tarrant County, Texas (2007–2022) (Republican)

==== County-level legislators ====
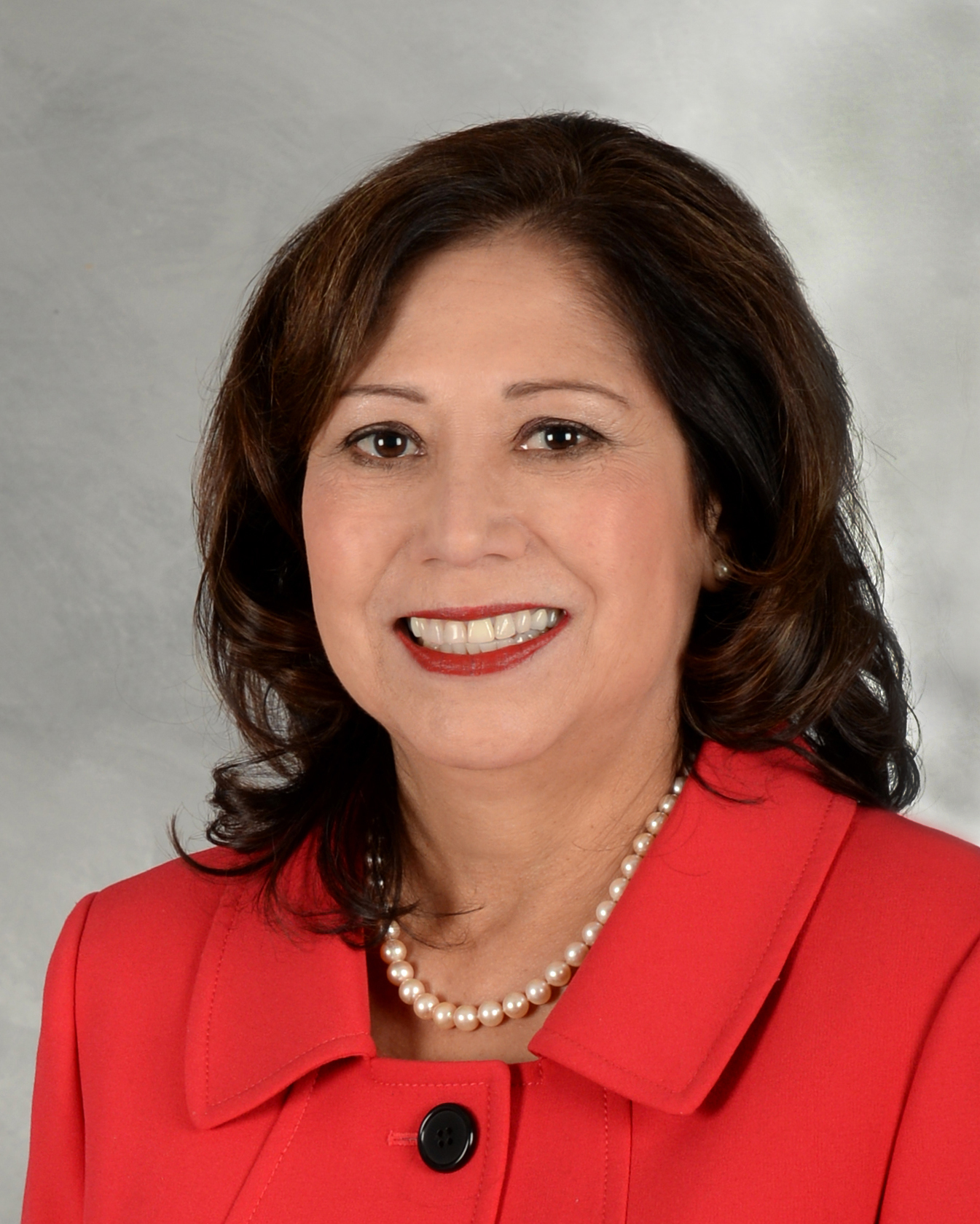
Hilda Solis

===== Burlington County, New Jersey Board of County Commissioners =====
- Balvir Singh (2018–2025)

===== Clark County Commission =====
- William McCurdy II, district D (2021–present), vice chair (2024–present)
- Tick Segerblom, district E (2019–present)

===== Cook County Board of Commissioners =====
- Donna Miller, district 6 (2018–present)
- Toni Preckwinkle, president (2010–present)

===== Franklin County, Ohio Board of Commissioners =====
- Kevin Boyce (2017–present)
- Erica Crawley (2021–present)

===== Hamilton County, Ohio Board of Commissioners =====
- Denise Driehaus (2017–present)
- Alicia Reece (2021–present)

===== Los Angeles County Board of Supervisors =====
- Janice Hahn, district 4 (2016–present), U.S. representative from CA-44 (2013–2016), and CA-36 (2011–2013)
- Lindsey Horvath, district 3 (2022–present), chair (2023–2024)
- Holly Mitchell, district 2 (2020–present)
- Hilda Solis, district 1 (2014–present), U.S. secretary of labor (2009–2013), U.S. representative from CA-32 (2001–2009)

===== Lucas County, Ohio Board of Commissioners =====
- Lisa Sobecki (2023–present)

===== Maricopa County Board of Supervisors =====
- Steve Gallardo, district 5 (2015–present)

===== Miami-Dade County Board of Commissioners =====
- Oliver Gilbert, district 1 (2020–present)

===== Montgomery County Council =====
- Will Jawando, at-large district (2018–present)

===== Prince George's County, Maryland County Council =====
- Wanika B. Fisher, district 2 (2022–present)
- Jolene Ivey, district 5 (2018–2024), president (2023–present)

===== San Diego County Board of Supervisors =====
- Monica Montgomery Steppe, district 4 (2023–present)
- Nora Vargas, district 1 (2021–2025), chair (2023–2025)

===== San Miguel County Board of Commissioners =====
- Art Goodtimes, district 3 (1996–2016) (Green)

=== Municipal officials ===
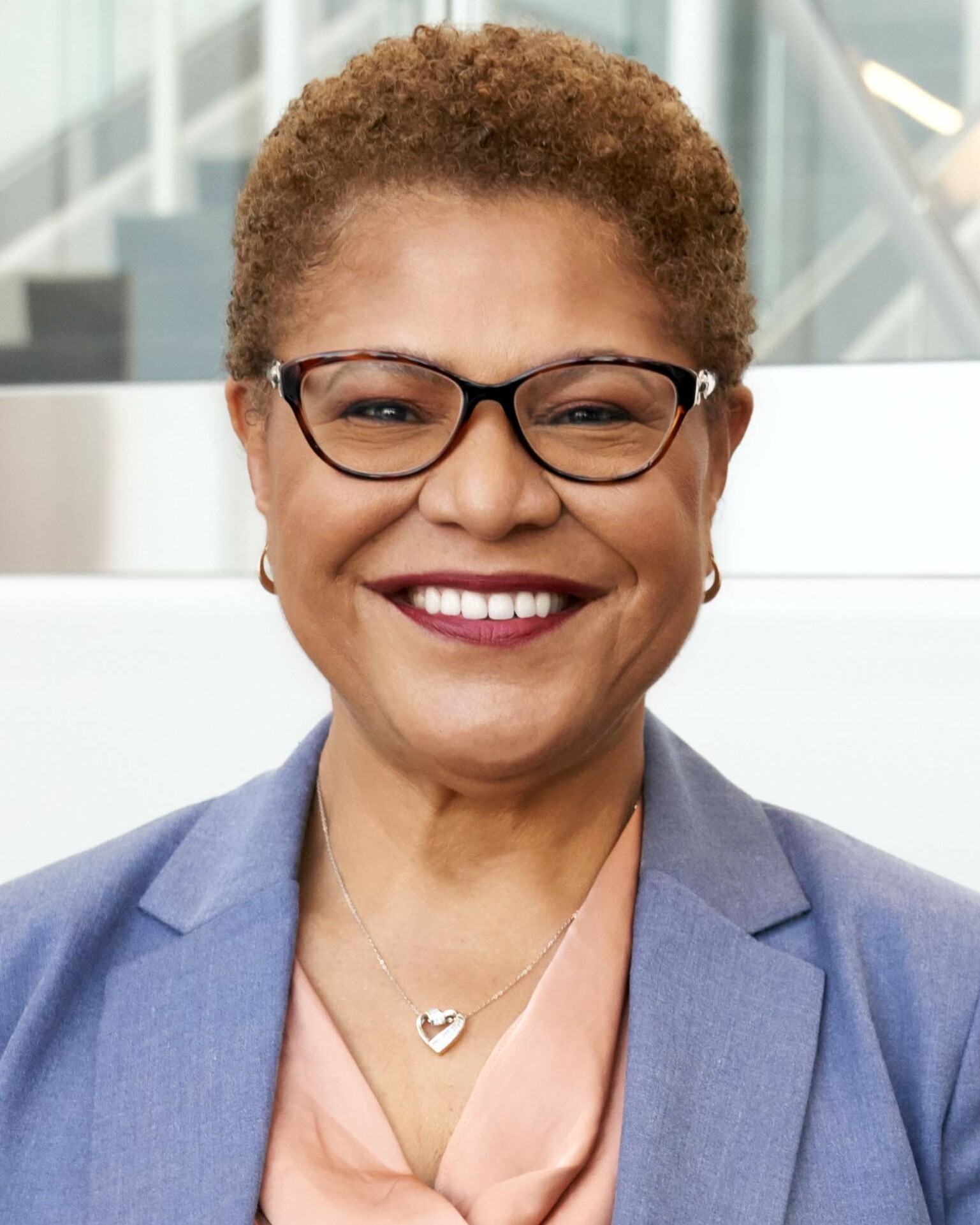
Karen Bass

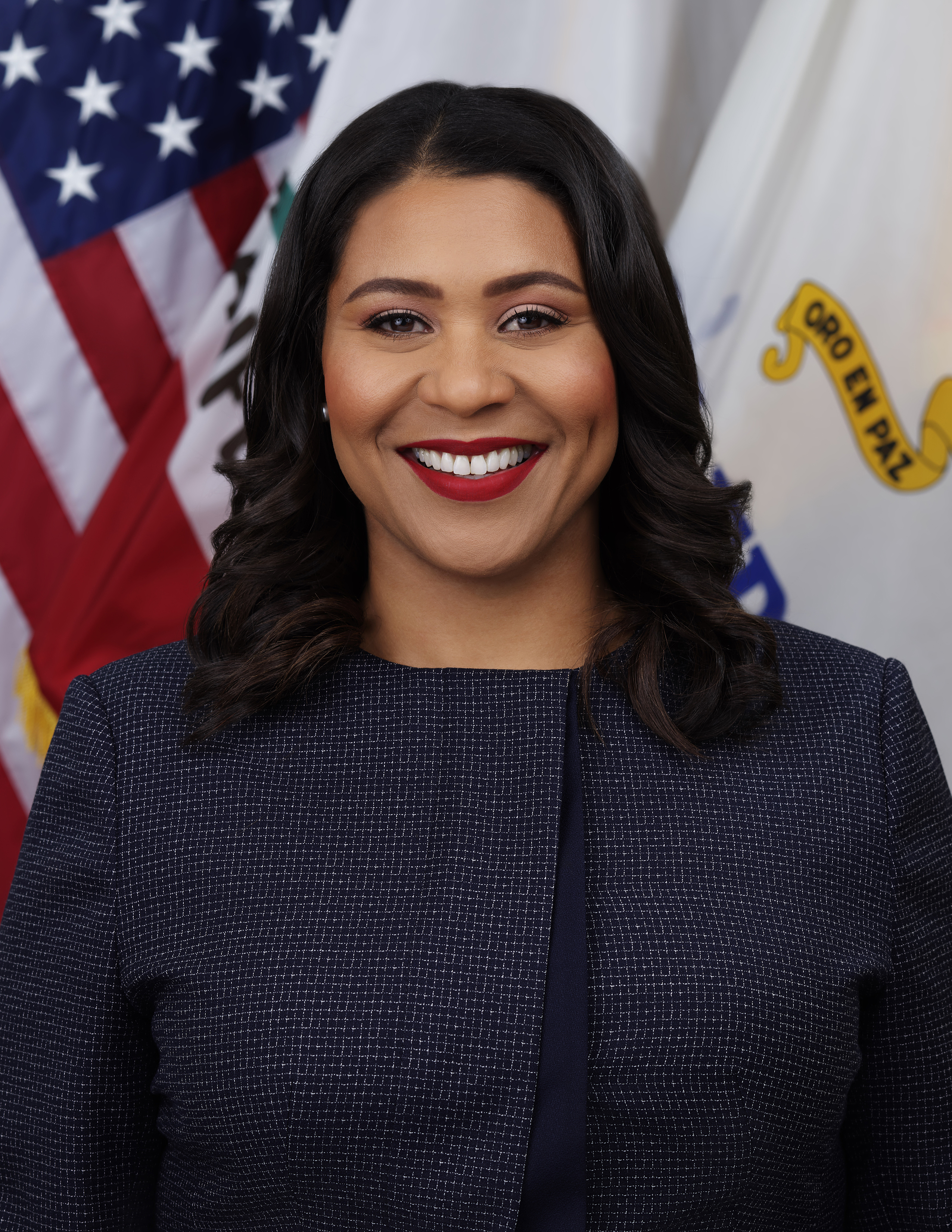
London Breed

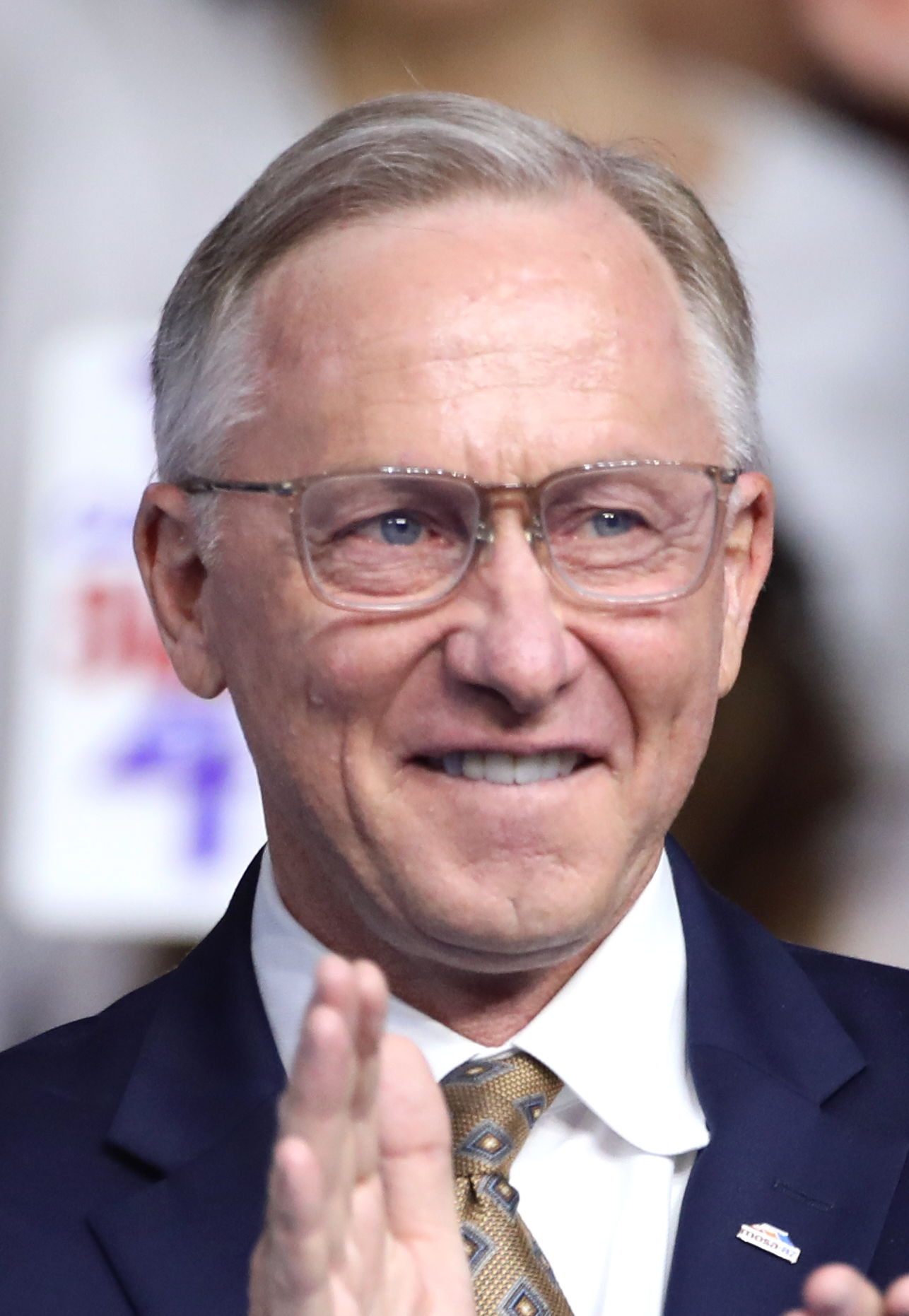
John Giles

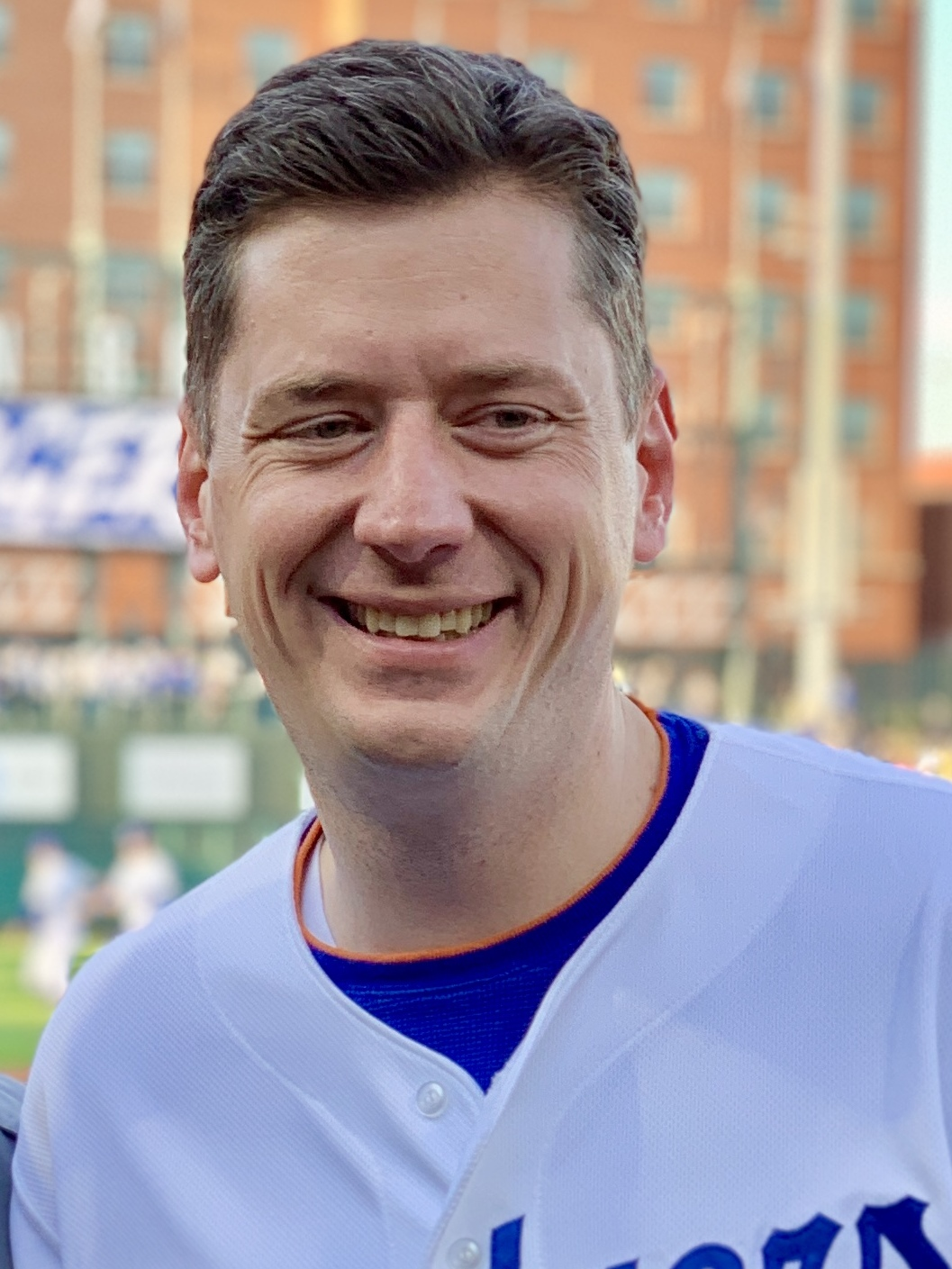
David Holt

==== Mayors ====
===== Current =====
- Eric Adams, mayor of New York, New York (2022–2025)
- Ashleigh Aitken, mayor of Anaheim, California (2022–present)
- Kenny Alexander, mayor of Norfolk, Virginia (2016–present)
- Jessica Anderson, mayor of Chapel Hill, North Carolina (2023–present)
- Arunan Arulampalam, mayor of Hartford, Connecticut (2024–present)
- Leirion Gaylor Baird, mayor of Lincoln, Nebraska (2019–present)
- Mary-Ann Baldwin, mayor of Raleigh, North Carolina (2019–2024)
- Ras Baraka, mayor of Newark, New Jersey (2014–present)
- Karen Bass, mayor of Los Angeles, California (2022–present)
- Lacey Beaty, mayor of Beaverton, Oregon (2021–present)
- Ravinder Bhalla, mayor of Hoboken, New Jersey (2018–2026)
- Justin Bibb, mayor of Cleveland, Ohio (2022–present)
- Daniel Biss, mayor of Evanston, Illinois (2021–present)
- Rosalynn Bliss, mayor of Grand Rapids, Michigan (2016–2025)
- J. Christian Bollwage, mayor of Elizabeth, New Jersey (1993–present)
- Muriel Bowser, mayor of Washington, D. C. (2015–present)
- London Breed, mayor of San Francisco, California (2018–2025)
- Errick D Simmons, mayor of Greenville, Mississippi (2015–present)
- Sharon Weston Broome, mayor-president of Baton Rouge, Louisiana and East Baton Rouge Parish (2017–2025)
- Lisa Brown, mayor of Spokane, Washington (2024–present)
- Michael P. Cahill, mayor of Beverly, Massachusetts (2014–present)
- Shari Cantor, mayor of West Hartford, Connecticut (2016–present)
- LaToya Cantrell, mayor of New Orleans, Louisiana (2018–2026)
- Melvin Carter, mayor of St. Paul, Minnesota (2018–2026)
- Jane Castor, mayor of Tampa, Florida (2019–present)
- Christy Underwood Clark, mayor of Huntersville, North Carolina (2023–present)
- Paige Cognetti, mayor of Scranton, Pennsylvania (2020–present)
- Mitch Colvin, mayor of Fayetteville, North Carolina (2017–present)
- John E. Dailey, mayor of Tallahassee, Florida (2018–present)
- Donna Deegan, mayor of Jacksonville, Florida (2023–present)
- Andre Dickens, mayor of Atlanta, Georgia (2022–present)
- Mark Dion, mayor of Portland, Maine (2023–present)
- Mike Duggan, mayor of Detroit, Michigan (2014–2026)
- Buddy Dyer, mayor of Orlando, Florida (2003–present)
- Justin Elicker, mayor of New Haven, Connecticut (2020–present)
- Malik Evans, mayor of Rochester, New York (2022–present)
- Jacob Frey, mayor of Minneapolis, Minnesota (2018–present)
- Steven Fulop, mayor of Jersey City, New Jersey (2013–2026)
- Ed Gainey, mayor of Pittsburgh, Pennsylvania (2022–2026)
- Kate Gallego, mayor of Phoenix, Arizona (2019–present)
- Joe Ganim, mayor of Bridgeport, Connecticut (1991–2003, 2015–present)
- Eric Genrich, mayor of Green Bay, Wisconsin (2019–present)
- John Giles, mayor of Mesa, Arizona (2014–2025) (Republican)
- Andrew Ginther, mayor of Columbus, Ohio (2016–present)
- Kelly Girtz, mayor of Athens, Georgia and Clarke County, Georgia (2019–present)
- Todd Gloria, mayor of San Diego, California (2020–present)
- Craig Greenberg, mayor of Louisville, Kentucky (2023–present)
- Reed Gusciora, mayor of Trenton, New Jersey (2018–present)
- Bruce Harrell, mayor of Seattle, Washington (2022–2026)
- Joe Hogsett, mayor of Indianapolis, Indiana (2016–present)
- David Holt, mayor of Oklahoma City, Oklahoma (2018–present) (Republican)
- Chris Hoy, mayor of Salem, Oregon (2022–2025)
- Brandon Johnson, mayor of Chicago, Illinois (2023–present)
- Cavalier Johnson, mayor of Milwaukee, Wisconsin (2021–present)
- Van R. Johnson, mayor of Savannah, Georgia (2020–present)
- Mike Johnston, mayor of Denver, Colorado (2023–present)
- Ella Jones, mayor of Ferguson, Missouri (2020–present)
- Phillip Jones, mayor of Newport News, Virginia (2023–present)
- Tishaura Jones, mayor of St. Louis, Missouri (2021–2025)
- Wade Kapszukiewicz, mayor of Toledo, Ohio (2018–present)
- Tim Keller, mayor of Albuquerque, New Mexico (2017–present)
- Tim Kelly, mayor of Chattanooga (2021–present) (Independent)
- Indya Kincannon, mayor of Knoxville, Tennessee (2019–present)
- Quinton Lucas, mayor of Kansas City, Missouri (2019–present)
- Chokwe Antar Lumumba, mayor of Jackson, Mississippi (2017–2025)
- Vi Lyles, mayor of Charlotte, North Carolina (2017–2026)
- Matt Mahan, mayor of San Jose, California (2023–present)
- Shammas Malik, mayor of Akron, Ohio (2024–present)
- Esther Manheimer, mayor of Asheville, North Carolina (2013–present)
- Cory Mason, mayor of Racine, Wisconsin (2017–present)
- Thomas McDermott Jr., mayor of Hammond, Indiana (2004–present)
- Lauren McLean, mayor of Boise, Idaho (2020–present)
- Eddie Melton, mayor of Gary, Indiana (2024–present)
- Erin Mendenhall, mayor of Salt Lake City, Utah (2020–present)
- Wayne Messam, mayor of Miramar, Florida (2015–present), 2020 candidate for the Democratic nomination for president
- Jon Mitchell, mayor of New Bedford, Massachusetts (2012–present)
- Nadia Mohamed, mayor of St. Louis Park, Minnesota (2022–present)
- James Mueller, mayor of South Bend, Indiana (2020–present)
- Chardale Murray, mayor of Hollywood, South Carolina (2023–present)
- Sheldon Neeley, mayor of Flint, Michigan (2019–present)
- Ron Nirenberg, mayor of San Antonio, Texas (2017–2025) (Independent)
- Freddie O'Connell, mayor of Nashville, Tennessee (2023–present)
- Michael Owens, mayor of Mableton, Georgia (2023–present)
- Cherelle Parker, mayor of Philadelphia (2024–present)
- Joseph Petty, mayor of Worcester, Massachusetts (2012–present)
- Aftab Pureval, mayor of Cincinnati, Ohio (2022–present)
- Mike Purzycki, mayor of Wilmington, Delaware (2017–2025)
- Steven Reed, mayor of Montgomery, Alabama (2019–present)
- Shawn Reilly, mayor of Waukesha, Wisconsin (2014–2026) (Independent)
- J. William Reynolds, mayor of Bethlehem, Pennsylvania (2022–present)
- Satya Rhodes-Conway, mayor of Madison, Wisconsin (2019–present)
- Rex Richardson, mayor of Long Beach, California (2022–present)
- Thomas Roach, mayor of White Plains, New York (2011–2026)
- Regina Romero, mayor of Tucson, Arizona (2019–present)
- Bill Saffo, mayor of Wilmington, North Carolina (2006–present)
- Andre Sayegh, mayor of Paterson, New Jersey (2018–present)
- Hillary Schieve, mayor of Reno, Nevada (2014–present) (Independent)
- Andy Schor, mayor of Lansing, Michigan (2018–present)
- Brandon Scott, mayor of Baltimore, Maryland (2020–present)
- Frank Scott Jr., mayor of Little Rock, Arkansas (2019–present)
- Brad Sellers, mayor of Warrensville Heights, Ohio (2012–present)
- Kahlil Seren, mayor of Cleveland Heights, Ohio (2022–2025)
- Kathy Sheehan, mayor of Albany, New York (2014–2025)
- Caroline Simmons, mayor of Stamford, Connecticut (2021–present)
- Derek Slaughter, mayor of Williamsport, Pennsylvania (2020–present)
- Marty Small Sr., mayor of Atlantic City, New Jersey (2019–present)
- Brett Smiley, mayor of Providence, Rhode Island (2023–present)
- Jaylen Smith, mayor of Earle, Arkansas (2023–present)
- Danene Sorace, mayor of Lancaster, Pennsylvania (2018–2026)
- Mike Spano, mayor of Yonkers, New York (2012–present)
- Darrell Steinberg, mayor of Sacramento, California (2016–2024)
- Lori Stone, mayor of Warren, Michigan (2023–present)
- Levar Stoney, mayor of Richmond, Virginia (2017–2025)
- Christopher Taylor, mayor of Ann Arbor, Michigan (2014–present)
- Bruce Teague, mayor of Iowa City, Iowa (2018–present)
- Sheng Thao, mayor of Oakland, California (2023–2024)
- Helen Tran, mayor of San Bernardino, California (2022–present)
- Dean Trantalis, mayor of Fort Lauderdale, Florida (2018–present)
- Tyrin Truong, mayor of Bogalusa, Louisiana (2023–present)
- Sharon Tucker, mayor of Fort Wayne, Indiana (2024–present)
- Matthew Tuerk, mayor of Allentown, Pennsylvania (2022–present)
- Nancy Vaughan, mayor of Greensboro, North Carolina (2013–2025)
- Ben Walsh, mayor of Syracuse, New York (2018–2025) (Reform/Independence)
- Harvey Ward, mayor of Gainesville, Florida (2023–present)
- Kirk Watson, mayor of Austin, Texas (2023–present)
- Ken Welch, mayor of St. Petersburg, Florida (2022–present)
- Ted Wheeler, mayor of Portland, Oregon (2017–2025)
- John Whitmire, mayor of Houston, Texas (2024–present)
- Leonardo Williams, mayor of Durham, North Carolina (2023–present)
- Wanda Williams, mayor of Harrisburg, Pennsylvania (2022–present)
- Justin Wilson, mayor of Alexandria, Virginia (2019–2025)
- Victoria Woodards, mayor of Tacoma, Washington (2018–2026)
- Randall Woodfin, mayor of Birmingham, Alabama (2017–present)
- Corey Woods, mayor of Tempe, Arizona (2020–present)
- Michelle Wu, mayor of Boston, Massachusetts (2021–present)
- Paul Young, mayor of Memphis, Tennessee (2023–present)

===== Former =====
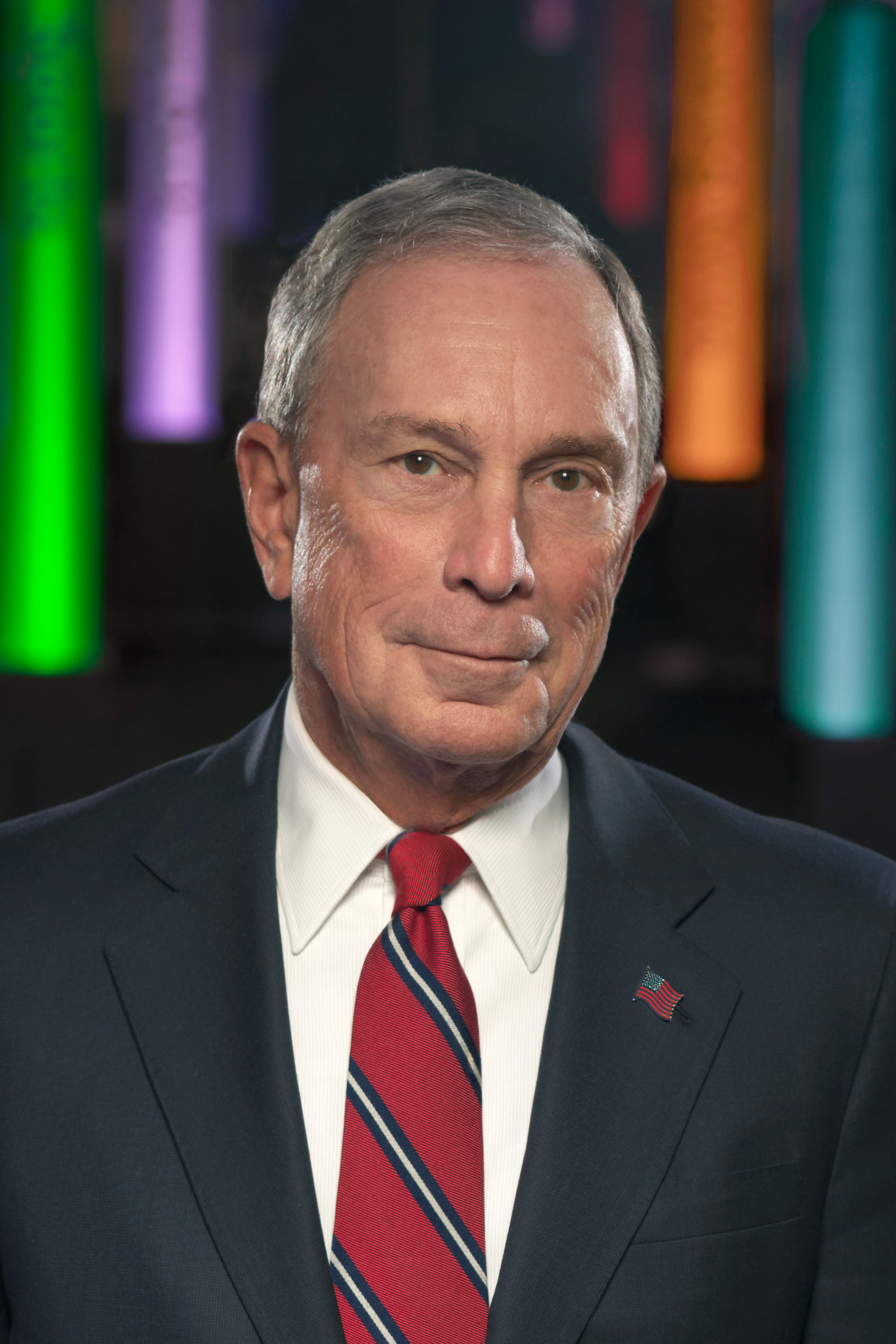
Michael Bloomberg

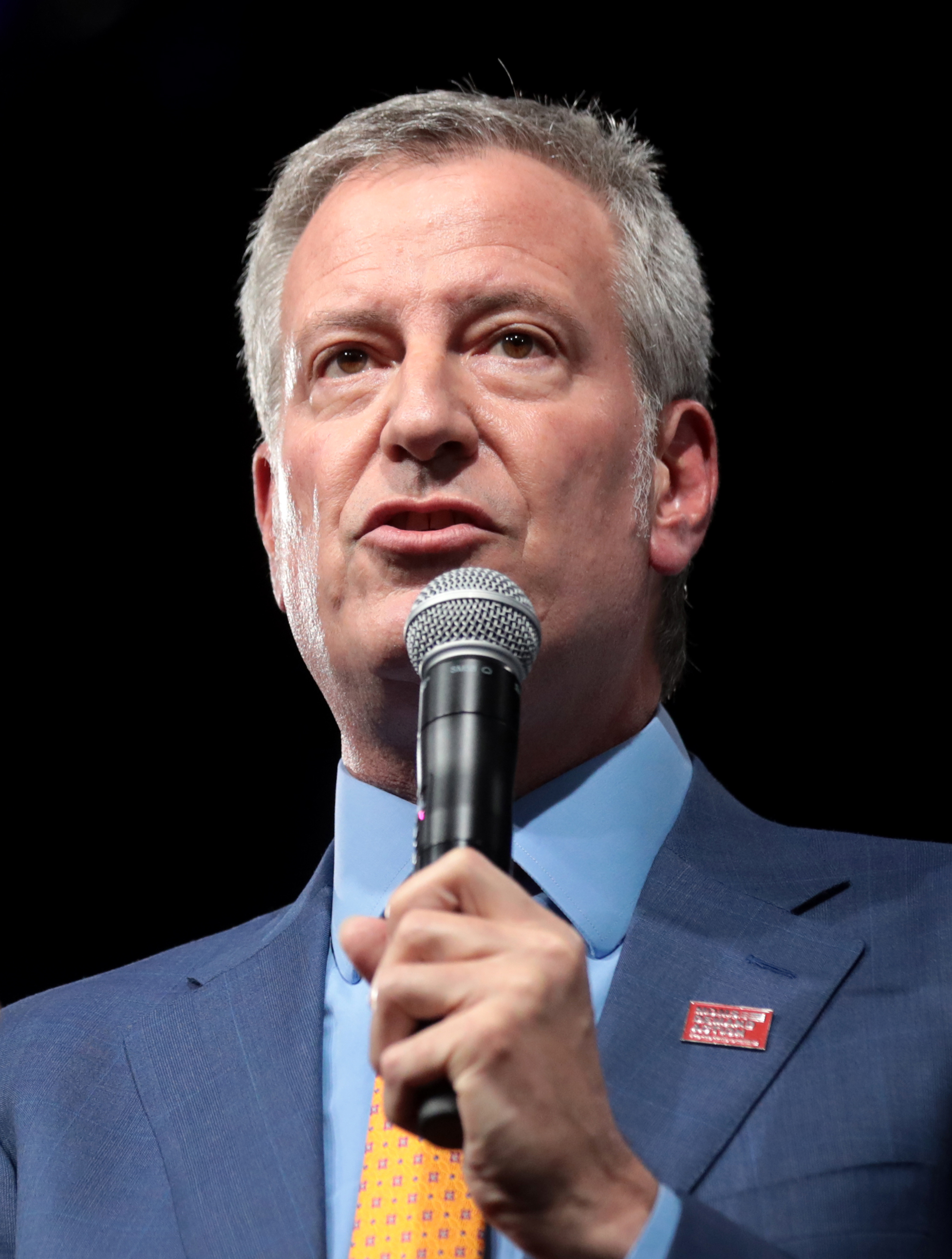
Bill de Blasio

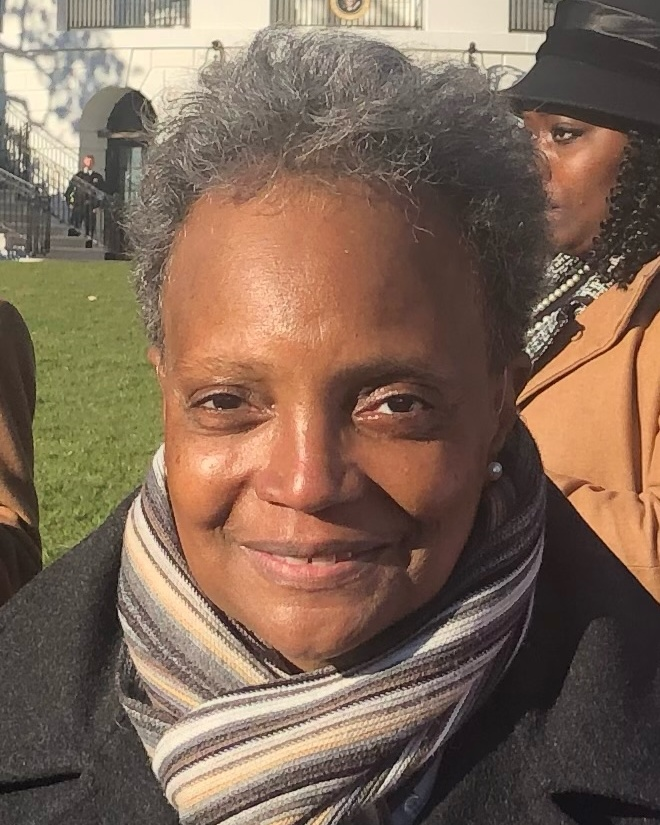
Lori Lightfoot

- Steve Adler, mayor of Austin, Texas (2015–2023)
- Megan Barry, mayor of Nashville, Tennessee (2015–2018)
- Bill de Blasio, mayor of New York City, New York (2014–2021), 2020 candidate for the Democratic nomination for president, New York City public advocate (2010–2013)
- Michael Bloomberg, mayor of New York City, New York (2002–2013), 2020 candidate for the Democratic nomination for president
- Luke Bronin, mayor of Hartford, Connecticut (2016–2024)
- Byron Brown, mayor of Buffalo, New York (2006–2024)
- Willie Brown, mayor of San Francisco, California (1996–2004)
- Bob Buckhorn, mayor of Tampa, Florida (2011–2019)
- Christopher Cabaldon, mayor of West Sacramento, California (1998–2020), 2024 Democratic nominee for the 3rd district of the California State Senate
- Joshua J. Cohen, mayor of Annapolis, Maryland (2009–2013)
- Chris Coleman, mayor of Saint Paul, Minnesota (2006–2018)
- Michael B. Coleman, mayor of Columbus, Ohio (2000–2016)
- Joyce Craig, mayor of Manchester, New Hampshire (2018–2024), 2024 Democratic nominee for governor
- Hardie Davis, mayor of Augusta, Georgia, & Richmond County, Georgia (2015–2022)
- Jorge Elorza, mayor of Providence, Rhode Island (2015–2023)
- Greg Fischer, mayor of Louisville, Kentucky (2011–2023)
- Shirley Franklin, mayor of Atlanta, Georgia (2002–2010)
- Dan Gelber, mayor of Miami Beach, Florida (2017–2023)
- Neil Giuliano, mayor of Tempe, Arizona (1994–2004)
- Phil Gordon, mayor of Phoenix, Arizona (2004–2012)
- Michael Hancock, mayor of Denver, Colorado (2011–2023)
- Betsy Hodges, mayor of Minneapolis, Minnesota (2014–2018)
- Sly James, mayor of Kansas City, Missouri (2011–2019)
- Jim Kenney, mayor of Philadelphia, Pennsylvania (2016–2023)
- Rick Kriseman, mayor of St. Petersburg, Florida (2014–2022)
- Emily Larson, mayor of Duluth, Minnesota (2016–2024)
- Sam Liccardo, mayor of San Jose, California (2015–2023), 2024 Democratic candidate for CA-16
- Lori Lightfoot, mayor of Chicago, Illinois (2019–2023)
- Raúl L. Martínez, mayor of Hialeah, Florida (1981–2005)
- Thomas M. McGee, mayor of Lynn, Massachusetts (2018–2022), former member of the Massachusetts Senate (2002–2018), former member of the Massachusetts House of Representatives, former chair of the Massachusetts Democratic Party (2013–2016)
- Marc Morial, mayor of New Orleans, Louisiana (1992–2002)
- Svante Myrick, mayor of Ithaca, New York (2012–2022)
- Michael Nutter, mayor of Philadelphia, Pennsylvania (2008–2016)
- Douglas Palmer, mayor of Trenton, New Jersey (1990–2010)
- Annise Parker, mayor of Houston, Texas (2010–2016)
- Bill Peduto, mayor of Pittsburgh, Pennsylvania (2014–2022)
- Stephanie Rawlings-Blake, mayor of Baltimore, Maryland (2010–2016)
- Jonathan Rothschild, mayor of Tucson, Arizona (2011–2019)
- Libby Schaaf, mayor of Oakland, California (2015–2023)
- Lottie Shackelford, mayor of Little Rock, Arkansas (1987–1988)
- John Tecklenburg, mayor of Charleston, South Carolina (2016–2024)
- Heather McTeer Toney, mayor of Greenville, Mississippi (2004–2011)
- Michael Tubbs, mayor of Stockton, California (2017–2021)
- Sylvester Turner, mayor of Houston, Texas (2016–2024), 2024 Democratic nominee for TX-18
- Thomas Volgy, mayor of Tucson, Arizona (1987–1991)
- Wellington Webb, mayor of Denver, Colorado (1991–2003)
- Miro Weinberger, mayor of Burlington, Vermont (2012–2024)
- Nan Whaley, mayor of Dayton, Ohio (2014–2022)

==== City councilors and municipal legislators ====
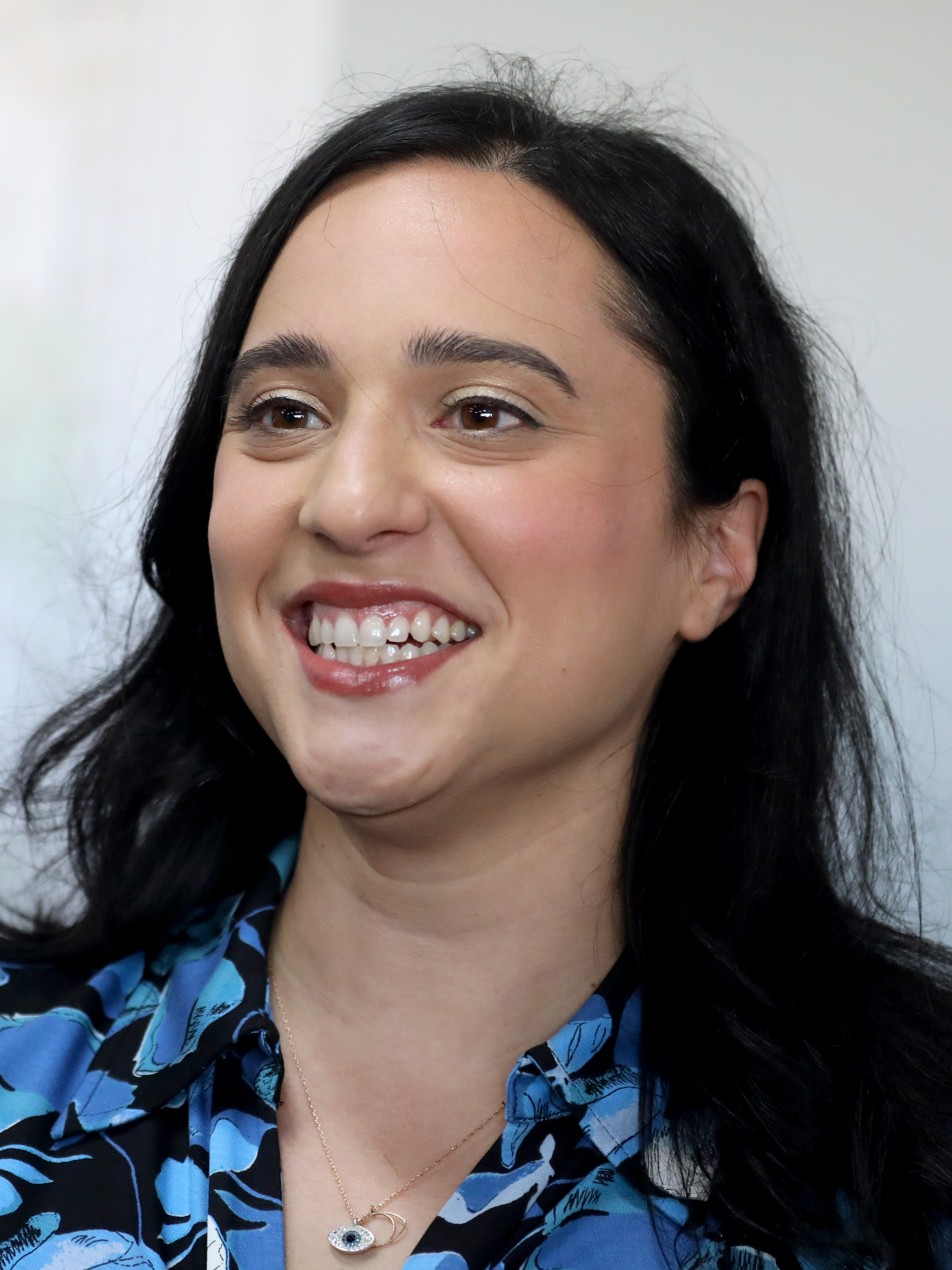
Yassamin Ansari

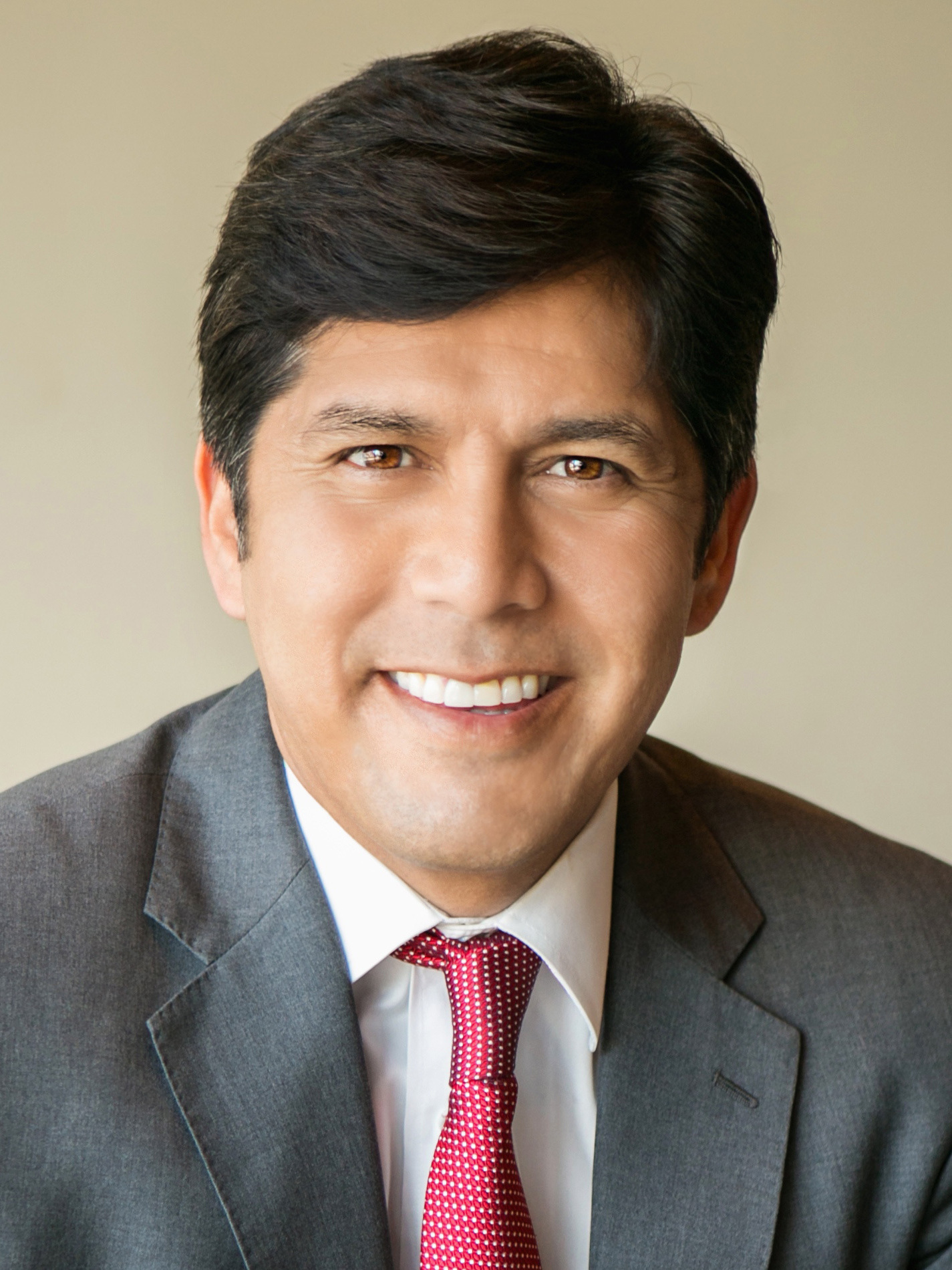
Kevin de León

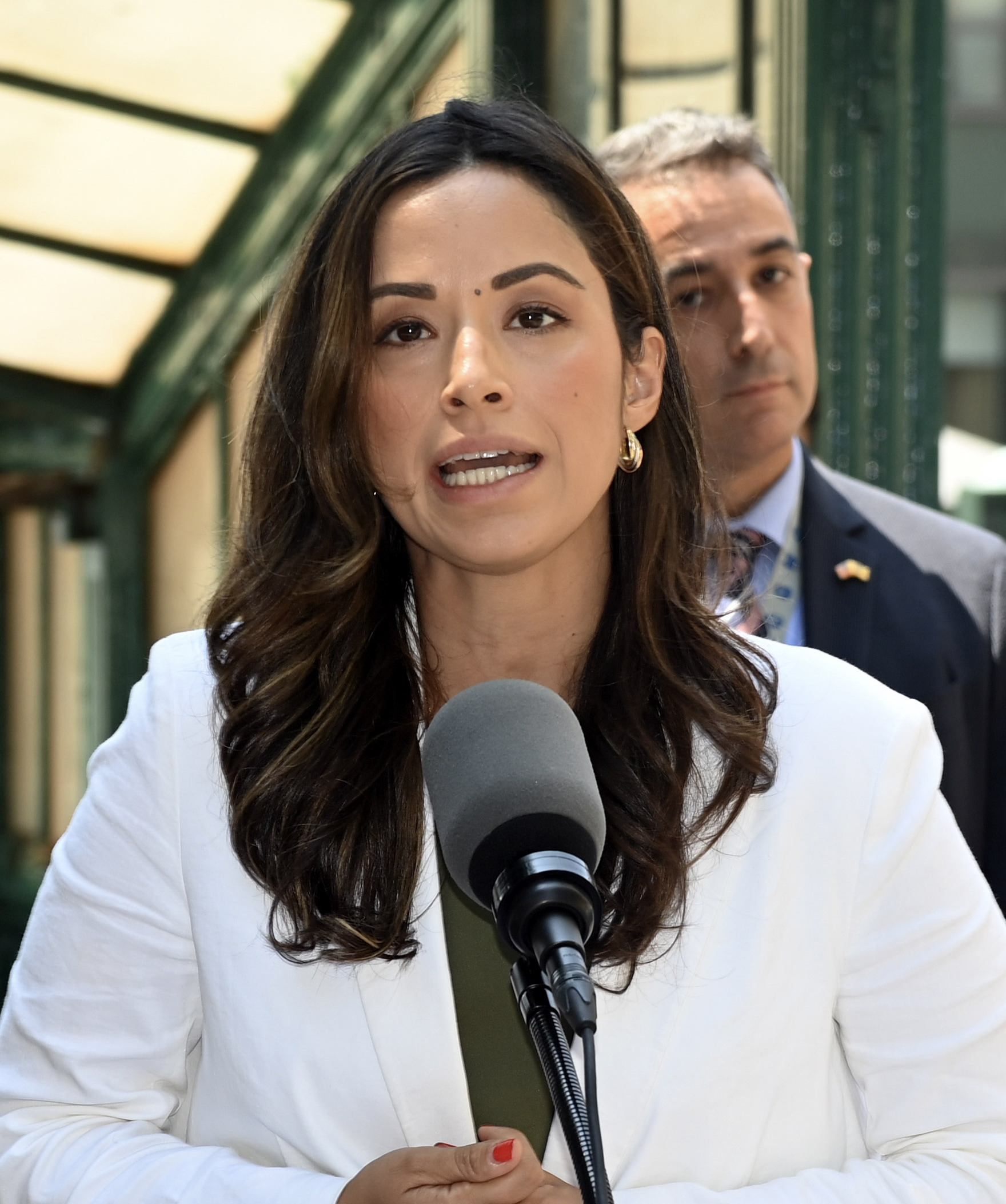
Carlina Rivera

===== Arcadia, California City Council =====
- Eileen Wang, district 3 (2022–2026)

===== Boston City Council =====
- Ruthzee Louijeune, at-large district (2022–present), president (2024–present)
- Brian Worrell, district 4 (2022–present)

===== Charlotte City Council =====
- Dimple Ajmera, at large district (2018–present)

===== Chicago City Council =====
- Timmy Knudsen, ward 43 (2022–present)
- Rue Simmons, ward 5 (2017–2021)
- William Singer, ward 44 (1969–1971), ward 43 (1971–1975)
- Tom Tunney, ward 44 (2003–2023), vice mayor (2019–2023)

===== Columbus City Council =====
- Shannon Hardin, district 9 (2014–present), president (2018–present)

===== Denver City Council =====
- Serena Gonzales-Gutierrez, at-large district (2023–present)

===== Durham City Council =====
- Javiera Caballero, at-large district (2018–present)

===== Honolulu City Council =====
- Ikaika Anderson, district 3 (2009–2021), chair (2019–2020)
- Esther Kiaʻāina, district 3 (2021–present)

===== Jacksonville City Council =====
- Rahman Johnson, district 14 (2023–present)

===== Las Vegas City Council =====
- Olivia Diaz, ward 3 (2019–present)

===== Los Angeles City Council =====
- Kevin de León, district 14 (2020–2024)
- Nithya Raman, district 4 (2020–present)

===== Minneapolis City Council =====
- Andrea Jenkins, ward 8 (2018–present)

===== New Orleans City Council =====
- Helena Moreno, at-large district (2018–present)

===== New York City Council =====
- Shaun Abreu, district 7 (2022–present)
- Adrienne Adams, speaker (2022–present), district 28 (2017–present)
- Diana Ayala, district 8 (2018–present)
- Erik Bottcher, district 3 (2022–present)
- Justin Brannan, district 47 (2018–present)
- Gale Brewer, district 6 (2002–2013, 2022–present)
- Selvena Brooks-Powers, district 31 (2021–present)
- Una S. T. Clarke, district 40 (1992–2001)
- Eric Dinowitz, district 11 (2021–present)
- Amanda Farías, district 18 (2022–present), majority leader (2024–present)
- Oswald Feliz, district 15 (2021–present)
- Crystal Hudson, district 35 (2022–present)
- Shekar Krishnan, district 25 (2022–present)
- Farah Louis, district 45 (2019–present)
- Melissa Mark-Viverito, district 8 (2006–2017), speaker (2014–2017)
- Julie Menin, district 5 (2022–present)
- Sandy Nurse, district 37 (2022–present)
- Chi Ossé, district 36 (2022–present)
- Keith Powers, district 4 (2018–present)
- Lincoln Restler, district 33 (2022–present)
- Carlina Rivera, district 2 (2018–present)
- Yusef Salaam, district 9 (2024–present), one of the Exonerated Five
- Pierina Sanchez, district 14 (2022–present)
- Lynn Schulman, district 29 (2022–present)
- Nantasha Williams, district 27 (2022–present)
- Susan Zhuang, district 43 (2024–present)

===== Philadelphia City Council =====
- Nina Ahmad, at-large district (2024–present)
- Cindy Bass, district 8 (2012–present)
- Kendra Brooks, at-large district (2020–present), minority leader (2024–present) (Working Families)
- Michael Driscoll, district 6 (2022–present)
- Jamie Gauthier, district 3 (2020–present)
- Jim Harrity, at-large district (2022–present)
- Kenyatta Johnson, district 2 (2012–present), president (2024–present)
- Curtis J. Jones Jr., district 4 (2008–present)
- Rue Landau, at-large district (2024–present)
- Quetcy Lozada, district 7 (2022–present)
- Nicolas O'Rourke, at-large district (2024–present) (Working Families)
- Anthony Phillips, district 9 (2022–present)
- Katherine Gilmore Richardson, at-large district (2020–present), majority leader (2024–present)
- Isaiah Thomas, at-large district (2020–present)

===== Phoenix City Council =====
- Yassamin Ansari, district 7 (2021–2024), 2024 Democratic nominee for AZ-02

===== Portland City Council =====
- Rene Gonzalez, position 3 (2022–2024), 2024 candidate for mayor of Portland

===== Salem City Council =====
- William Smaldone, ward 2 (1998–2002) (Socialist Party of Oregon)

===== Seattle City Council =====
- Tina Podlodowski, position 7 (1995–1999)

==== Executive officials ====
===== Current =====
- Art Acevedo, assistant city manager of Austin, Texas (2024–present)
- David Chiu, city attorney of San Francisco (2021–present)
- Mara Elliott, San Diego city attorney (2016–2024)
- Melissa Conyears Ervin, city treasurer of Chicago (2019–present)
- Vanessa Gibson, borough president of the Bronx (2022–present)
- Brad Lander, New York City comptroller (2022–present)
- Mark Levine, borough president of Manhattan (2022–present)
- Antonio Reynoso, borough president of Brooklyn (2022–present)
- Donovan Richards, borough president of Queens (2020–present)
- Curtis Richardson, member of the Tallahassee City Commission from seat 2 (2014–present)
- Minita Sanghvi, Saratoga Springs commissioner of finance (2021–present)
- Jumaane Williams, New York City public advocate (2019–present)

===== Former =====
- Ed Davis, commissioner of the Boston Police Department (2006–2013)
- Howard Jordan, chief of the Oakland Police Department (2011–2013)
- Charles H. Ramsey, commissioner of the Philadelphia Police Department (2008–2016)

==== Other municipal officials ====
- Sam Cho, Seattle Port Commission Position 2 (2020–present)
- Matt Kopec, member of the Amphitheater Public Schools Governing Board (2018–present)
- Lateefah Simon, president of the BART Board of Directors (2020–2025) and board member from District 7 (2016–2025), 2024 Democratic candidate for CA-12

== Party organizations and officials ==
=== State and territorial party chairs ===
- Alicia Andrews, chair of the Oklahoma Democratic Party (2019–present)
- Lavora Barnes, chair of the Michigan Democratic Party (2019–present)
- Yolanda Bejarano, chair of the Arizona Democratic Party (2023–present)
- Liz Beretta-Perik, chair of the Rhode Island Democratic Party (2023–present)
- Anderson Clayton, chair of the North Carolina Democratic Party (2023–present)
- Rosa Colquitt, chair of the Oregon Democratic Party (2023–present)
- Shasti Conrad, chair of the Washington State Democratic Party
- Nancy DiNardo, chair of the Connecticut Democratic Party (2020–2025, 2005–2015)
- Colmon Elridge, chair of the Kentucky Democratic Party
- Randal Gaines, chair of the Louisiana Democratic Party (2024–present)
- David Glidden, chair of the Vermont Democratic Party (2023–present)
- Rusty Hicks, chair of the California Democratic Party (2019–present)
- Gilberto Hinojosa, chair of the Texas Democratic Party (2012–present)
- LeRoy J. Jones Jr., chair of the New Jersey Democratic Party (2021–present)
- Randy Kelly, chair of the Alabama Democratic Party
- Steve Kerrigan, chair of the Massachusetts Democratic Party (2023–present)
- Jane Kleeb, chair of the Nebraska Democratic Party (2016–present)
- Diane Lewis, chair of the Utah Democratic Party (2021–present)
- Betsy Maron, chair of the Delaware Democratic Party
- Shad Murib, chair of the Colorado Democratic Party (2023–present)
- Hendrell Remus, chair of the Tennessee Democratic Party (2021–2025)
- Mike Schmuhl, chair of the Indiana Democratic Party (2021–present)
- Christale Spain, chair of the South Carolina Democratic Party (2023–present)
- Susan Swecker, chair of the Democratic Party of Virginia (2015–present)
- Grant Tennille, chair of the Arkansas Democratic Party (2021–present)
- Derek Turbin, chair of the Hawaii Democratic Party (2024–present)
- Bev Uhlenhake, chair of the Maine Democratic Party
- Ken Ulman, chair of the Maryland Democratic Party (2023–present), county executive of Howard County, Maryland (2006–2014)
- Jessica Velasquez, chair of the New Mexico Democratic Party (2021–present)
- Elizabeth Walters, chair of the Ohio Democratic Party (2021–present)
- Mike Wenstrup, chair of the Alaska Democratic Party (2013–2016; 2022–present)
- Ben Wikler, chair of the Wisconsin Democratic Party (2019–present)

=== Former state party officials ===
- Michael Brodkorb, deputy chair of the Republican Party of Minnesota (2009–2011) (Republican)
- Al Cárdenas, chair of the Republican Party of Florida (1999–2003), chairman of the American Conservative Union (2011–2014) (Republican)
- Ken Cole, chair of the Maine Republican Party (??–??) (Republican)
- Jennifer Horn, chair of the New Hampshire Republican Party (2013–2017), co-founder of The Lincoln Project (Republican until 2020, Independent)
- Yvette Lewis, chair of the Maryland Democratic Party (2011–2015, 2019–2023)
- Robert A. G. Monks, chair of the Maine Republican Party (1980–1984) (Republican)
- Ted O'Meara, chair of the Maine Republican Party (1990–1992) (Republican)
- David Pepper, chair of the Ohio Democratic Party (2015–2020)
- Bill Press, chair of the California Democratic Party (1993–1996)
- Gary Reed, executive director of the Michigan Republican Party (1992–1995) (Republican)
- Chris Vance, chair of the Washington State Republican Party (2001–2006), chair of the Washington State Forward Party (2022–2023) (Republican until 2020, Independent)
- Judith Whitmer, chair of the Nevada Democratic Party (2021–2023)

=== Local and municipal party chairs ===
- Bob Brady, chair of the Philadelphia Democratic Party (1986–present), U.S. representative from PA-1 (1998–2019)

=== State and territorial political parties ===
Harris was endorsed by all 56 state and territorial Democratic parties, as well as three state and territorial third parties.

- Alabama Democratic Party
- Alaska Democratic Party
- American Samoa Democratic Party
- Arizona Democratic Party
- Arkansas Democratic Party
- California Democratic Party
- Colorado Democratic Party
- Connecticut Democratic Party
- Connecticut Working Families Party
- Delaware Democratic Party
- District of Columbia Democratic State Committee
- Florida Democratic Party
- Democratic Party of Georgia
- Democratic Party of Guam
- Hawaii Democratic Party
- Idaho Democratic Party
- Illinois Democratic Party
- Indiana Democratic Party
- Iowa Democratic Party
- Kansas Democratic Party
- Kentucky Democratic Party
- Louisiana Democratic Party
- Maine Democratic Party
- Maryland Democratic Party
- Maryland Forward Party
- Massachusetts Democratic Party
- Michigan Democratic Party
- Minnesota Democratic–Farmer–Labor Party
- Mississippi Democratic Party
- Missouri Democratic Party
- Montana Democratic Party
- Nebraska Democratic Party
- Nevada Democratic Party
- New Hampshire Democratic Party
- New Jersey Democratic State Committee
- New Mexico Democratic Party
- New York State Democratic Committee
- North Carolina Democratic Party
- North Dakota Democratic–Nonpartisan League Party
- Democratic Party of the Northern Mariana Islands
- Ohio Democratic Party
- Oklahoma Democratic Party
- Oregon Democratic Party
- Pennsylvania Democratic Party
- Popular Democratic Party
- Democratic Party of Puerto Rico
- Rhode Island Democratic Party
- South Carolina Democratic Party
- South Dakota Democratic Party
- Tennessee Democratic Party
- Texas Democratic Party
- Utah Democratic Party
- Vermont Democratic Party
- Democratic Party of the Virgin Islands
- Democratic Party of Virginia
- Washington State Democratic Party
- West Virginia Democratic Party
- Wisconsin Democratic Party
- Wyoming Democratic Party

=== Local Democratic parties ===
- Brooklyn Democratic Party
- Carter County Democratic Party
- Clarion County Democratic Party
- Clark County (OH) Democratic Party
- Clark County (WA) Democrats
- Cleveland County Democratic Party
- Dallas County Democratic Party
- Fayette County Democratic Party
- Franklin County (OH) Democratic Party
- Franklin County (PA) Democratic Committee
- Jeff Davis County Democratic Party
- Los Angeles County Democratic Party
- Loudoun County Democratic Committee
- Louisville Democratic Party
- Madison County Democratic Party
- Miami-Dade Democratic Party
- Monroe County Democratic Party
- Orange County Democratic Party
- Philadelphia Democratic Party
- San Diego County Democratic Party
- San Francisco Democratic Party
- Wayne County OH Democratic Party
- Wayne County PA Democratic Party

== See also ==
- List of Barack Obama 2008 presidential campaign endorsements from state, local and territory officials
- List of Donald Trump 2024 presidential campaign state, municipal, sub-state, and local officials endorsements
- List of Kamala Harris 2024 presidential campaign political endorsements
