= Frank O'Brien =

Frank O'Brien may refer to:

- Frank O'Brien (politician), Pennsylvania politician
- Frank O'Brien (footballer) (1900–1986), Australian rules footballer
- Frank O'Brien (rugby union) (1910–1984), Australian rugby union player
- Frank P. O'Brien, mayor of Birmingham, Alabama
- Dink O'Brien (Frank Aloysius O'Brien, 1894–1971), baseball player

== See also ==
- Francis O'Brien (disambiguation)
