= Erin Molchany =

American politician (born 1977)

Erin C. Molchany

Member of the Pennsylvania House of Representatives from the 22nd district
- In office 2013–2014
- Preceded by: Martin Schmotzer
- Succeeded by: Peter Schweyer (22nd District moved to Allentown, Pennsylvania)

Personal details
- Born: June 13, 1977 (age 49) Allentown, Pennsylvania
- Party: Democratic
- Education: Duquesne University
- Profession: Non-profit executive
- Website: ErinMolchany.com

Erin C. Molchany (born June 13, 1977) is an American politician and a former member of the Pennsylvania House of Representatives. She also previously served as the Southwest Director for Pennsylvania Governor Tom Wolf. She is member of the Democratic Party.

== Personal life and education ==
Molchany is a native of Allentown, Pennsylvania. Molchany graduated from Parkland High School in 1995 and Duquesne University in 1999.

== Career ==
While at Duquesne University, Molchany worked at the Emergency Services Department of the American Red Cross's Southwest PA chapter in Pittsburgh. Molchany served as the head of the Pittsburgh Urban Magnet Project. She has been affiliated with the Coro Center, and served on the Allegheny County Democratic Committee. Molchany has also been affiliated with the Mount Washington Community Development Corporation, the Greater Pittsburgh Nonprofit Partnership, the League of Women Voters, and the Mentoring Partnership of Southwestern Pennsylvania. Molchany was named by Pittsburgh Magazine as one of the "40 Under 40" in 2013 for her legislative and non-profit career work.

=== 2005 City Council Race ===
Molchany first ran for public office in 2005 for the District 2 seat in Pittsburgh City Council against endorsed candidate Dan Deasy, Paul Mastreanda, Paul Renne, and Melissa Rossiter. Molchany placed fourth in the primary election held on May 17 with 615 votes.

=== 2012 Election ===
After 22nd district incumbent Chelsa Wagner was elected to the office of Allegheny County Controller in 2011, Erin announced her candidacy for the seat in February. Running against Martin Schmotzer and Shawn Lunney, Schmotzer won the special election on April 24 to finish Wagner's term, but lost the primary election for the new term to Molchany. Molchany subsequently won her general election race to the Pennsylvania House in November, 2012.

== Pennsylvania State House Career ==
Molchany served on the Consumer Affairs, Education, and Human Services committees. Molchany prioritized mass-transit funding, protecting clean air and clean water, public education, and supporting local businesses. She saw the Pennsylvania voter ID bill as a distraction from more important priorities. Molchany was one of a number of Democratic legislators who supported Gov. Tom Corbett's 2013 transportation bill. In addition, Molchany supported legislation supporting equal pay for equal work alongside Rep. Brian Sims of Philadelphia.

=== Redistricting and 2014 Primary Election ===
Due to mandated redistricting every ten years, the 22nd legislative district was moved across the state to Allentown while the former footprint was split between the surrounding existing legislative districts. Molchany's own residence was redistricted into the 36th district, represented by Harry Readshaw since 1995. Receiving the endorsements of newly elected Mayor of Pittsburgh Bill Peduto, Allegheny County Executive Rich Fitzgerald, as well as a number of Pittsburgh City Council members, Molchany declared her re-election bid for the new 36th district on February 18 to a crowd of supporters at the City Theatre on the South Side. Molchany later received endorsements from the Pittsburgh Post-Gazette, SEIU 32BJ and SEIU Healthcare PA, Planned Parenthood PAC, the Pittsburgh Federation of Teachers, among others. Molchany lost the primary election to Rep. Readshaw on May 20, 2014 by a margin of 60.02% to 39.80%.

=== Post-House Career ===
On January 20, 2015, Molchany was sworn in as the Southwest Director for Gov. Tom Wolf. She worked in that capacity until early 2019, when she briefly served as a Special Advisor to the Governor. She subsequently took another Commonwealth position as a Legislative Liaison in the Department of Health.
