= Pennsylvania House of Representatives, District 22 =

American legislative district

Pennsylvania's 22nd State House of Representatives district
Representative
Ana Tiburcio; D–Allentown
- Population (2022): 62,468

The 22nd Pennsylvania House of Representatives District is in southeastern Pennsylvania. The seat is currently represented by Ana Tiburcio, a Democrat.

== District profile ==
The 22nd District is located within Lehigh County and includes following areas:

- Allentown (part)
  - Ward 01
  - Ward 04
  - Ward 05
  - Ward 06
  - Ward 07
  - Ward 08 (part)
    - Division 01
    - Division 02
    - Division 03
    - Division 05
    - Division 06
  - Ward 09
  - Ward 10
  - Ward 11 (part)
    - Division 02
  - Ward 14
  - Ward 15
- Salisbury Township (part)
  - Ward 01
  - Ward 02
  - Ward 03 (part)
    - Division 02

== Representatives ==
Representative	Party	Years	District home	Note
Before 1969, seats were apportioned by county.
Frank W. O'Brien	Democrat	1969 – 1970		
William J. Coyne	Democrat	1971 – 1972	Pittsburgh	
James A. Romanelli	Democrat	1973 – 1975		Resigned November 17, 1975.
Charles Logue	Democrat	1976 – 1978		Elected to fill Romanelli's unexpired term in April 1976
Steve Seventy	Democrat	1979 – 1988		Died in office 1988
Frank Gigliotti	Democrat	1989 – 2000		Resigned on June 15, 2000
Michael Diven	Democratic	2001 – 2005		Switched party in 2005
Michael Diven	Republican	2005 – 2006		
Chelsa Wagner	Democrat	2007 – 2012	Pittsburgh	Resigned to take office as Allegheny County Controller
Martin Schmotzer	Democrat	2012 – 2013	Pittsburgh	Elected in special election on April 24, 2012; lost concurrent primary to serve a full term to Erin Molchany.
Erin Molchany	Democrat	2013 – 2014		Redistricting moved this seat; Molchany lost a primary election against fellow incumbent Harry Readshaw
District moved from Allegheny County to Lehigh County after 2014
Peter Schweyer	Democrat	2015 – 2023	Allentown	Redistricted to the 134th district in 2022.
Joshua Siegel	Democrat	2023 – 2025	Allentown	Resigned after being elected Lehigh County Executive.
Ana Tiburcio	Democrat	2026 – present	Allentown	Won special election in February 2026; Lost renomination in 2026 primary election.

== Recent election results ==
PA House special election, 2026: Pennsylvania House, District 22
Party	Candidate	Votes	%
Democratic	Ana Tiburcio	1,474	67.3
Republican	Robert E. Smith Jr.	717	32.7
Total votes		2,191	100.0

PA House election, 2024: Pennsylvania House, District 22
Party	Candidate	Votes	%
Democratic	Josh Siegel (incumbent)	Unopposed	
Total votes		13,248	100.00
Democratic hold			

PA House election, 2022: Pennsylvania House, District 22
Party	Candidate	Votes	%
Democratic	Josh Siegel	6,442	63.76
Republican	Robert Smith, Jr.	3,662	36.24
Total votes		10,104	100.00
Democratic hold			

PA House election, 2020: Pennsylvania House, District 22
Party	Candidate	Votes	%
Democratic	Peter Schweyer (incumbent)	Unopposed	
Total votes		13,969	100.00
Democratic hold			

PA House election, 2018: Pennsylvania House, District 22
Party	Candidate	Votes	%
Democratic	Peter Schweyer (incumbent)	Unopposed	
Total votes		9,911	100.00
Democratic hold			

PA House election, 2016: Pennsylvania House, District 22
Party	Candidate	Votes	%
Democratic	Peter Schweyer (incumbent)	Unopposed	
Total votes		15,222	100.00
Democratic hold			

PA House election, 2014: Pennsylvania House, District 22
Party	Candidate	Votes	%
Democratic	Peter Schweyer	4,538	70.18
Republican	Robert Smith, Jr.	1,928	29.82
Total votes		6,466	100.00
Democratic hold			

PA House election, 2012: Pennsylvania House, District 22
Party	Candidate	Votes	%
Democratic	Erin Molchany	17,512	65.33
Republican	Chris Cratsley	9,292	34.67
Total votes		26,804	100.00
Democratic hold			

PA House special election, 2012: Pennsylvania House, District 22
Party	Candidate	Votes	%
Democratic	Martin Schmotzer	4,230	58.82
Republican	Chris Cratsley	2,961	41.18
Total votes		7,191	100.00
Democratic hold			

PA House election, 2010: Pennsylvania House, District 22
Party	Candidate	Votes	%
Democratic	Chelsa Wagner (incumbent)	Unopposed	
Total votes		14,744	100.00
Democratic hold			
