= Schmotzer =

Schmotzer is a German surname. Notable people with the surname include:

- Chris Schmotzer, German physician
- Martin Schmotzer, entrepreneur and United States politician
