= Bloody Wednesday (film) =

- Directed by: Mark G. Gilhuis
- Written by: Philip Yordan
- Produced by: Mark G. Gilhuis; Philip Yordan
- Starring: Raymond Elmendorf; Pamela Baker; Jeff O'Haco
- Cinematography: Robert Ryan
- Edited by: Gene Ruggiero
- Music by: Albert Sendrey
- Production companies: Gilmark Pictures; Visto International Inc.
- Distributed by: Prism Entertainment
- Release date: September 8, 1988
- Running time: 96 minutes
- Language: English

Bloody Wednesday is a 1988 thriller film directed by Mark G. Gilhuis and starring Raymond Elmendorf, Pamela Baker, and Jeff O'Haco. It is based on the events of the San Ysidro McDonald's massacre.

== Premise ==
Harry is an auto mechanic going through a nasty divorce. When he gets fired from his job, he begins to lose his mind and walks into a church nude. Harry is subsequently committed to a mental hospital. After his release, he decides to stay in an abandoned hotel, where he begins having hallucinations. As his life degenerates, Harry begins to plan a shooting massacre at a local fast food restaurant.

== Cast ==
- Raymond Elmendorf as Harry
- Pamela Baker as Dr. Johnson
- Navarre Perry as Ben Curtis
- Teresa Mae Allen as Elaine Curtis
- Jeff O'Haco as Animal
- Linda Dona as Pretty Lady
- Herb Kronsberg as Walter Burns
- Murray Cruchley as Lou Cramer

== Release ==
Bloody Wednesday was shot in 1985 and released on September 8, 1988, on VHS. On April 19, 2016, the film was released on DVD in the United States by Film Chest. A Blu-ray release has yet to be announced.

Variety said it was like "a silent era morality play."

== Differences between the real massacre and the movie ==
The name of the killer is Harry instead of the real James Huberty and Harry uses a revolver instead of a Browning HP used by Huberty. The Uzi used in the film was fully automatic while Huberty's Uzi was semi-automatic.

James Huberty was taken down and killed by a police SWAT sniper, while Harry is fatally shot down by a restaurant customer.

The real-life massacre took place at a McDonald's restaurant, while the massacre in the movie takes place at a nameless cafe.

The actual massacre lasted for 77 minutes, while the massacre in the movie lasts for the final five minutes.

Five children (under age 18) were killed in the actual massacre, while no children are seen in the movie.
