= Frank Gigliotti =

Pennsylvanian politician convicted of extortion and bribery (1942–2011)

Frank J. Gigliotti
- Born: October 30, 1942; Pittsburgh, PA, US
- Died: August 7, 2011 (aged 68); Florida, US
- Occupations: Construction, politician
- Years active: 1969–1975, 1983–2000
- Criminal charges: Bribery and extortion
- Criminal penalty: 25 months imprisonment; Six months work release
- Criminal status: Released
- Children: Three

Member of the Pennsylvania House of Representatives from the 22nd district
- In office January 3, 1989 – June 15, 2000
- Preceded by: Steve Seventy

Personal details
- Party: Democratic

Frank J. Gigliotti (October 30, 1942 – August 7, 2011) was an American construction worker-turned-politician in Pennsylvania. He was convicted of bribery and extortion in 2000, and was released from prison in 2003.

== Personal life ==
Frank J. Gigliotti was born on October 30, 1942, in Pittsburgh, Pennsylvania. His siblings were Theresa, Anthony, and Michael. He graduated South Hills Catholic High School in 1969, and attended Carnegie Mellon Managerial School. In 1997, Gigliotti separated from his wife and mother of his three children (Christina, Regina, and Frank Jr.); as of January 25, 2000, he was not married. Gigliotti moved to West Melbourne, Florida, in 2003, and died in that state from complications of diabetes on August 7, 2011.

== Career ==
Before even graduating high school, Gigliotti operated a backhoe in the construction industry from 1969 to 1975.

=== Civil service ===
In 1975, Gigliotti was hired by the Pittsburgh Public Works Department. In 1977, when he helped elect Richard Caliguiri as mayor of Pittsburgh, he collected significant political cachet that propelled him into intradepartmental promotions and eventually the chairmanship of the city's 19th Ward (South Hills) from 1983 to 1989.

Succeeding Steve Seventy on January 3, 1989, Gigliotti was first seated as a representative for the Pennsylvania House of Representatives, District 22. Nominated by Representative Anthony Colaizzo, Gigliotti was appointed as the house teller on the same day. During his tenure in the Pennsylvania House, Gigliotti was a powerful politician who failed to legalize riverboat gambling. In 1997, he was a straw donor for Bob O'Connor's mayoral campaign before "realizing that was illegal." A Democrat, he was still representing District 22 upon his resignation of June 15, 2000.

==== Extortion ====
From 1996–1998, Schneider Engineering Technologies was contracted with the Allegheny County Sanitary Authority (Alcosan). During those years, Gigliotti extorted Disney World tickets and airfare from Frank Schneider, saying that otherwise he would influence the Alcosan board against Schneider's interests.

In 1998, Gigliotti was bribed by Ernest Smalis, a Shadyside bridge painter under government contract. In exchange for cash and a paid trip to Disney World, Gigliotti applied his influence to the Alcosan board and other state government agencies. When Smalis became an informant for the state's investigation, he was recorded suggesting to Gigliotti that government's purpose is to "give back" value to the people; the lawmaker replied, "[Expletive] the people." [sic] In 1999, Gigliotti sold confidential Alcosan bidding information to Smalis for US$1,000 (equivalent to $1,933 in 2025). He failed to reach an identical agreement with Mascaro Inc. the very next day.

In 1998 and 1999, Gigliotti accepted $17,100 in bribes from Alcosan contractor PF Environmental in exchange for securing a recycling contract; he then demanded 10% of the contract's profits and additional monthly payments of $2,000 (equivalent to $3,865 in 2025).

==== Prosecution ====
In December 1999, a federal grand jury handed down a 27-count indictment for soliciting and accepting bribes from government contractors. Gigliotti paid for his legal defense with $3,000 (equivalent to $5,609 in 2025) from his campaign finance; as of April 2001, the Pennsylvania Department of State was investigating these payments to Manifesto & Donahoe for legal propriety.

As part of a plea bargain, Gigliotti pled guilty to extortion, mail fraud and filing a false income tax return in April 2000. Prosecutors recommended 30–37 months imprisonment. At Gigliotti's request, Representatives W. Curtis Thomas and Edward P. Wojnaroski Sr. wrote to Judge Gustave Diamond to speak of Gigliotti's "honesty and integrity" and to call him a "fine character", respectively; they were joined in this effort by former Pennsylvania representatives Christopher K. McNally and Greg Fajt. On June 21, 2000, Gigliotti was instead sentenced by Judge Diamond to 46 months in US federal prison and a fine of $6,000 (equivalent to $11,217 in 2025); Diamond explained the longer sentence, saying that "Gigliotti treated his political power and influence as a commodity to be sold for personal profit, which he did without restraint or regret".

=== Post-incarceration ===
Released from a West Virginia prison in mid-July 2002 as part of a work release program, Gigliotti was hired by Alco Parking Co.—Pittsburgh's "largest operator of [parking] lots and garages"—through his family connections. He earned $8 per hour (equivalent to $14.32/hr in 2025). He was expected to complete the program in January 2003.
