= Jack Devlin =

Jack Devlin may refer to:

- Jack Devlin (Australian politician)
- Jack Devlin (American politician)
- Jack Devlin, in Ex on the Beach (series 6)
- Jack Devlin, character in The Net, 1995 film
- Jack Devlin, character in Blackjack, 1998 film
- Jack Devlin, character in Tin Star, 2017 TV series
