= Charles Logue =

Charles Logue may refer to:

- Charles Logue (politician) (1922–2000), Democratic member of the Pennsylvania House of Representatives
- Charles Logue (builder) (1858–1919), Irish immigrant to the U.S. who founded the Charles Logue Building Company
- Charles A. Logue (1889–1938), American screenwriter
