= Chris McNally =

Chris McNally may refer to:

- Christopher McNally (born 1960), member of the Pennsylvania House of Representatives
- Chris McNally (actor) (born 1988), Canadian-born actor
