= Senator Devlin =

Senator Devlin may refer to:

- John H. Devlin (1891–1967), Pennsylvania State Senate
- Richard Devlin (born 1952), Oregon State Senate
