= McDonald's attack =

McDonald's attack may refer to:

- San Ysidro McDonald's massacre (1984), a mass shooting at a McDonald's restaurant in San Diego, California
- Taiwan McDonald's bombings (1992), a series of bombings at various McDonald's restaurants in Taiwan
- Sydney River McDonald's murders (1992), a robbery and mass attack at a McDonald's restaurant in Sydney River, Nova Scotia
- Kenosha shooting (1993), a mass shooting at a McDonald's restaurant in Kenosha, Wisconsin
- Makassar bombing (2002), a bombing at a McDonald's restaurant in Makassar, Indonesia
- Murder of Anna Svidersky (2006), the stabbing death of a teenager working at a McDonald's restaurant in Vancouver, Washington
- Beating of Chrissy Lee Polis (2011), the beating of a transgender woman at a McDonald's restaurant in Rosedale, Maryland
- Murder of Wu Shuoyan (2014), a beating death by members of a religious group at a McDonald's restaurant in Zhaoyuan, China
- Munich shooting (2016), a mass shooting at and near a McDonald's restaurant in Munich, Germany
- Cologne attack (2018), an arson attack and hostage-taking at and near a McDonald‘s restaurant in Cologne, Germany
- Magnificent Mile shooting (2022), a mass shooting at and near a McDonald's restaurant in Chicago, Illinois
