= Rawalpindi Leprosy Hospital =

Geography
- Location: Rawalpindi, Pakistan
- Coordinates: 33°37′07″N 73°04′21″E

Organisation
- Care system: Public
- Religious affiliation: British Leprosy Mission

History
- Opened: 1904

Links
- Lists: Hospitals in Pakistan

The Rawalpindi Leprosy Hospital (Urdu: راولپنڈی لیپروسی ہسپتال) is a non-profit leprosy hospital in Pakistan. It is among the oldest leprosy hospitals in the region.

Chris Schmotzer is the current medical director of the hospital.

== History ==
It was established in 1904 by the British Leprosy Mission. Originally situated in a remote area outside Rawalpindi, the hospital now located in a densely populated part of the city. The hospital's creation was proposed by an American professor, R. R. Stewart, teaching at the nearby Gordon College, after encountering a group of lepers living on the city's outskirts, in a leper colony, as mandated by the Lepers Act, 1827.

The hospital provided treatment for leprosy patients from across British India. In the late 1930s, a home for healthy children of patients was established, though it was closed in the early 1960s due to changes in treatment methods. The American Mission also built asylums for leprosy patients, but these were eventually closed or converted into hospitals following the discovery of a cure in 1948.

In 1968, the German Leprosy Relief Association-backed organization Aid to Leprosy Patients assumed control of the hospital, and by 1965, it began serving as a referral center. Since 1970, the hospital has operated a 40-bed short-term admission unit and a six-day-a-week outpatient clinic.

The General Skin Clinic, introduced in 1972, treats leprosy alongside other skin diseases and assists with early detection. Subsequent additions to the hospital include the general physiotherapy department in 1981, an eye clinic in 1995, and a surgical unit in 1986. In 1999, a small-scale tuberculosis control program was initiated.

Aid to Leprosy Patients created a social department in 1992 to rehabilitate cured patients by assessing individual needs and implementing rehabilitation steps. The Leprosy Control Programme in Pakistan is a collaboration between the provincial health department and Aid to Leprosy Patients.
