= William J. Coyne =

American politician (1936–2013)

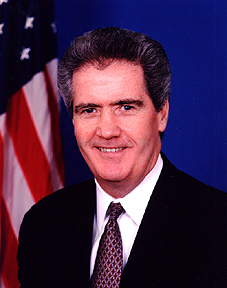

Member of the U.S. House of Representatives from Pennsylvania's 14th district
- In office January 3, 1981 – January 3, 2003
- Preceded by: William S. Moorhead
- Succeeded by: Mike Doyle

Member of the Pennsylvania House of Representatives from the 22nd district
- In office January 5, 1971 – November 30, 1972
- Preceded by: Frank W. O'Brien
- Succeeded by: James A. Romanelli

Personal details
- Born: William Joseph Coyne; August 24, 1936 Pittsburgh, Pennsylvania, U.S.
- Died: November 3, 2013 (aged 77) Pittsburgh, Pennsylvania, U.S.
- Party: Democratic
- Education: Robert Morris College

William Joseph Coyne (August 24, 1936 – November 3, 2013) was a Democratic member of the United States House of Representatives from Pennsylvania from 1981 to 2003.

== Early life and education ==
Coyne was born in Pittsburgh, Pennsylvania. He graduated from Central Catholic High School in 1954, and received a B.S. in accounting from Robert Morris College.

He served two years in the United States Army from 1955 to 1957. He served as a supply sergeant in Korea. After completing his military service, he set up a private accounting firm.

== Political career ==
From 1970 to 1972 he was member of the Pennsylvania House of Representatives, and a member of the Pittsburgh City Council from 1974 to 1980.

=== Congress ===
Coyne was elected to Congress in 1980, succeeding 24-year incumbent William S. Moorhead in a district taking in most of Pittsburgh. He was reelected ten times, never facing serious opposition. He was a longtime member of the House Ways and Means Committee.

=== Retirement and death ===
In 2002, Coyne's district was combined with the district of Mike Doyle, a somewhat more moderate Democrat. Although the new district contained more of Coyne's territory than Doyle's, Coyne retired to avoid the possibility of two Democratic incumbents facing each other in the primary elections.

Coyne died at the age of 77 on November 3, 2013, two months after falling and sustaining head injuries.

== Sources ==
- "William J. Coyne Biography". www.house.gov/coyne. United States House of Representatives. Archived from the original on May 24, 1998.
- "Pennsylvania's 14th Congressional District". www.house.gov/coyne. United States House of Representatives. Archived from the original on January 16, 2001.
- United States Congress. "William J. Coyne (id: C000846)". Biographical Directory of the United States Congress.

U.S. House of Representatives
Preceded by William S. Moorhead	Member of the U.S. House of Representatives from Pennsylvania's 14th congressional district 1981–2003	Succeeded by Michael F. Doyle
