= The Demon of Brownsville Road =

2014 book by Bob Cranmer and Erica Manfred

- The first edition of the book
- Author: Bob Cranmer & Erica Manfred
- Language: English
- Genre: Horror/Non-fiction memoir
- Publisher: Berkley Books of Penguin Random House
- Publication date: August 5, 2014
- Publication place: United States
- Media type: Print, electronic, audio

The Demon of Brownsville Road is a book by Bob Cranmer and Erica Manfred, published in August 2014. The story is also the basis of a series of television documentaries and dramatizations released between 2011 and 2016. The book is claimed to be based on the paranormal experiences of the Cranmer family, with Bob Cranmer telling the first-person account.

Top reviews from the United States; Amazon.com.

"Reviewed in the United States on August 27, 2014 Can't get this fascinating book off my mind. I read it a second time to let everything sink in. First reading I stayed up late to find out what happened next. It is an entertaining page turner. I found it a well written and interesting read. I read mainly non-fiction and enjoy the personal background stories. Cranmer's life story is rather remarkable. This book was obviously not written to be sensational . If you want more cheap spooky thrills you've missed the significance of this book. It forces one to consider the reality of the spiritual realm and all the implications it has for your faith in God or lack thereof. It's straightforward prose and lack of hype add to the story's believability. If the story is true, and I believe it is, it can change your whole view of life. That is why this story is important. It's good the author had the courage to tell it all."

== Historical basis ==
In March 1792 a mother and her three young children were killed by marauding Native Americans in the vicinity of Fort Pitt during the Northwest Indian War. This was done to discourage continued pioneer settlement in Western Pennsylvania and Ohio. The book maintains that this massacre occurred on the ground where the house is built and that the four individuals are buried in the front yard. The premise for the demonic infestation is that the evil spirit that precipitated the vicious killing of these innocents remained on the grounds and eventually inhabited the house that would be built there. An immigrant laborer would also put a curse on the house while it was under construction out of jealousy for its wealthy owner and his beautiful wife. The book additionally states that a local doctor would later perform many illegal abortions in the house when its owners were in need of money to maintain their servants and upper-class lifestyle. There are no records or firsthand accounts of this illegal activity but an investigative newspaper article did identify that such a doctor did exist and that local lore supported the claim that he performed many abortions. It is presented that the demonic spirit was primarily focused upon hurting and killing children.

In December 1988, Bob and Lesa Cranmer and their four children moved into the house. This began the long string of events that eventually led to a “demonic entity” being expelled from their home in 2006 by priests of the Catholic Church.

== The book ==
The house at 3406 Brownsville Road was built in 1909-10 and had three previous owners prior to the Cranmers. In December 1988 Bob and Lesa Cranmer bought the house upon being transferred to Pittsburgh by his employer. Bob states that the house was his “dream” to own, and that it mysteriously went up for sale the same week that they began looking for a house to buy. As a young child he would often stand and stare at the house hoping that someday he could see the inside. The three-story house was built in the Craftsman style and would later be designated as a historical landmark (by Pittsburgh History & Landmarks) because of its unique design. Bob and Lesa married in 1980 while Bob was an officer in the U.S. Army. He left the service in 1986 and went to work for AT&T in Whippany, New Jersey. Their objective was to eventually relocate to Pittsburgh, where Bob had grown up. This was realized more quickly than they had expected, as they had just built a new house in 1987. They had four children: Jessica (4), Bobby (3), David (2), and Charles (2 months) when they moved to Pittsburgh.

Bob Cranmer states that the sellers seemed very anxious to move out and surprisingly accepted his first (low-ball) offer without any negotiations. During a walk-through of the house young Bobby Jr. wandered off by himself as the group went to the basement. He would soon be found on the front staircase crying and hyperventilating as if “he’d seen a ghost”. Lesa later expressed to Bob her misgivings about the house, that it was much too large, and furthermore “gave her the creeps.” Bob discounted this and was determined to make this house a home for his young family. He did however ask the seller if there “was anything wrong with the house.” Understanding exactly what he was referring to the seller assured him that the house was fine and that Catholic Mass was conducted several times in the living room of the house. Bob thought this was an odd response but took it with the reassurance that had been implied. The following spring, Bob discovered a small metal box buried in the front yard containing Catholic religious items. He called the previous owner who had assured him that “the house was fine” only then to hear him say “just put it back where you found it.”

Within weeks of moving in Bob and Lesa began to experience paranormal activity in the house. The first phenomenon they experienced was a pull-chain on a light in a coat closet that continuously wrapped itself around the light and would never remain in the hanging position. Soon other nuisance activities would begin and continued for years. The family chose to ignore them, accepting that they shared their home with a “spirit”. Bob would go on to hold political office in the 1990s, first as a councilman and then county commissioner, gaining significant notoriety and celebrity in the western Pennsylvania (Pittsburgh) area.

Over the years the Cranmer family became increasingly dysfunctional and eventually Lesa and two of the children would experience serious mental issues which would require hospitalization. Bob had no idea that the spirit in the house had anything to do with the relational and psychological issues within his family and he attempted to manage his way through it. However, one night in 2003 his oldest son attacked him and Bob would be arrested. The next morning his elderly aunt who was living with the family was also found dead in her bed from natural causes.

All charges associated with the incident would eventually be dropped but the paranormal activity in the house increased like a dam had been broken. Within a month Bob was at his wit's end and decided to contact the Catholic Church for help (the Cranmers were not Catholics at the time). The mayor of Pittsburgh, Tom Murphy, who was a personal friend of Cranmer, went to see the then Bishop of Pittsburgh, Donald Wuerl, to request the assistance of the Diocese. Wuerl would assign management of the case to Father Ron Lengwin who would eventually be assisted by several other priests and one lay person, Connie Valenti. Thus would begin a battle to cleanse the house from a demonic spirit that would take two years. Paranormal researchers from Penn State University would eventually become associated with the situation and would later move on to celebrity with a hit television show called Paranormal State. The group's leader (Ryan Buell) would later discuss the Cranmer house in an article for People Magazine. The Mel Gibson movie The Passion of the Christ is also presented in the book as playing a significant role in cleansing the house from the evil entity.

The infestation of the house would come to an end in February 2006 and Cranmer would begin to write the story from notes that he had kept the next year. The book was released in 2014 with great media acclaim and Cranmer would be interviewed across the country. His reputation as a public official, combined with the involvement of other notable individuals; i.e. Mayor Thomas J. Murphy, Jr., Bishop Donald Wuerl, and Fr. Ronald Lengwin, added a foundation of credibility to the story while also attracting the attention of the Pittsburgh media. Cranmer had little to gain and his reputation to lose, yet he states that the story had to be told to verify that “Evil” does exist in the world.

The manuscript was written by Cranmer and eventually reduced in size and rearranged by the professional author and editor Erica Manfred. She was the third of three writers employed by Cranmer as issues and conflicts kept arising which seemed intent on preventing the book from being published.

== Criticism ==
With the notoriety of the book in the metropolitan Pittsburgh area, one of the two major newspapers (The Post-Gazette) decided to do an investigative article about the story. Many of the individuals in the book were interviewed and some of the historical accounts were checked. The doctor cited was verified to have been a local resident, as was his nefarious abortionist reputation, obviously with no official records existing for the decades-old illegal activities. Monsignor Ron Lengwin, spokesman for the Catholic Diocese of Pittsburgh, affirmed every aspect of the book along with the official involvement of the Catholic Church.

However, the primary source of criticism came from several children or grandchildren of the two families who preceded the Cranmers' living in the house (a period of 47 years, all previous owners being deceased). They all claimed to have no recollection of any paranormal activity in the house and said that the story was fabricated by Cranmer for his own waning notoriety. Cranmer retorted that the Joyce children (of the prior owners) were upset that the reputation of their deceased parents was possibly being besmirched by the book. (Even though a fictitious name was used to identify them.) Coincidentally, the couple died of natural causes in the months just prior to the book's publication.

Cranmer stated that Mrs. Joyce made it clear to both him and his wife that she "detested" the Wagners, who had sold the house to them. He stated: "People are always concerned that they can be held legally liable if they do not reveal to buyers problems of a spiritual nature with a house, - which I discovered is not the case in Pennsylvania. Their reactions are obviously intended to cover up the deception used in selling the house, both in 1979 and 1988. The house was not officially sold in 1941 by the original owners, but was purchased via a Sheriff's sale. The house sat empty then for an extended period and became known as the haunted house by the local children who ventured into it."

Cranmer also states in the book that one daughter (Barbara Wagner) who grew up in the house did (reluctantly) detail significant paranormal activity to him while he was writing the book (she died before publication). He also stated that the son of a man who had grown up in the neighborhood during the 1930s affirmed that the house was widely known to be haunted. In addition he claims that one of the sons of the previous owners (the Joyces) verified strange activity to him before that son understood that a book would cast an unfavorable light upon his deceased father. Cranmer has offered to pay for and take a lie-detector test concerning any of the claims presented in his book as long as the three adult children of the previous owners join him. Subsequent to publication (July 2016) a granddaughter of the doctor (presented in the book) contacted Cranmer to tell him that even though she was too young at the time to know of her grandfather's illegal practice, she could confirm that his personality and "evil demeanor" fit what her early memories could recall. The story didn't surprise her as she described him "throwing shoes at her" when she was a toddler.

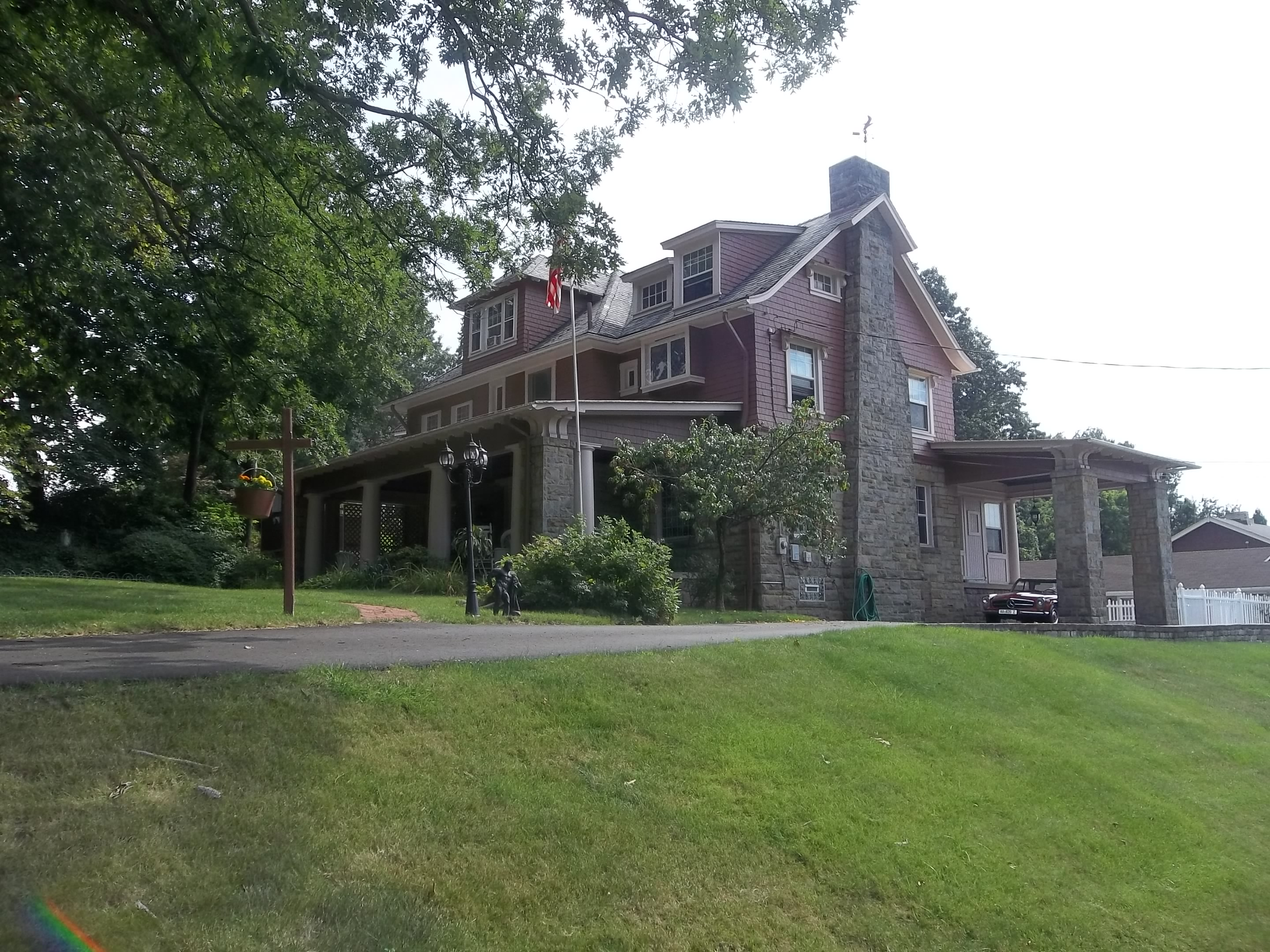
The house in 2013

Cranmer's response to the article, which was printed by the Post-Gazette three days later, is as follows:

October 29, 2014 12:00 AM

Any author should relish an article about their book by a major newspaper, positive or negative. However, the recent PG coverage of my book was over the top (“Former Residents of Brentwood ‘Demon’ House Dispute Book,” Oct. 26). The front-page Sunday article clearly sought to discredit the story, its basis in Christian faith and its controversial topics.

I’ve dealt with the press enough to know that when an article is to have a slant nothing one says can change it. I spent almost two hours on the phone with the reporter, successfully addressing every objection, yet only a few brief comments from me were published. Once I determined that the reporter’s intent was negative, I simply braced myself. But if it prompts more reading of the book so much the better.

In a special report in Skeptical Inquirer, - "The Satanic Skeptic Investigates the Demon of Brownsville Road"; contributor JD Sword (a self-avowed member of the Church of Satan) questions other claims made by Cranmer in his book. Sword begins by explaining how since a demonic exorcism performed by the Catholic Diocese of Pittsburgh in 2006, the Brownsville house was converted into a bed and breakfast in 2019, so any attempt to truly investigate the house would be difficult, if not just written off as Cranmer claims it has been "free and clear" of issues since the exorcism. The B&B page states that Cranmer is open to discussing his book but "ghost hunters and paranormal investigators" are not permitted as such activity could possibly reignite the paranormal issues. However, Sword did manage to do some digging into the history and methods used by Cranmer in the book. For example, in the book, Cranmer claims to have spoken to the daughter of the couple who owned the house from 1941 to 1979, Barbara Paisley, stating Paisley and her family had encountered spiritual events in the house "many times", even going so far as saying that her husband added that once a visiting dog in the house seemed to sense these spirits and went room to room in search of them. However, according to Paisley's daughter, Karen Dwyer, her mother, grandmother and grandfather had never mentioned anything about the house being haunted nor was there even a dog as a parents did not like to have pets.

Sword also did research into "Dr. M" from the book. Connie Valenti, a psychic, claimed to have visions revealing the house was once used by a “Dr. M,” rumored to have performed illegal abortions in the 1920s and 1930s. Through searching records from the time, it was accepted that "Dr. M's" real name was Dr. James Merton “Clay” Mahan, a wealthy pediatrician who owned the Mahan Hospital in the Arlington neighborhood of Pittsburgh - which overlooks the South-Side, a former industrial district of Pittsburgh. Monsignor Ron Lengwin, a senior Catholic priest of the diocese and the psychic Valenti claimed while being built on a site of a violent 1792 Native American attack on a family, the four victims being buried in the front yard, also alleged Mahan fueled the demonic possession at 3406 Brownsville Road. However, when asked in an interview about evidence supporting Mahan was in fact responsible for the demon at Brownsville Road, Lengwin, Valenti and Cranmer either claimed they did not need the supporting evidence because Mahan was not actually named in the book and could tell the story however they saw it, or in the case of Cranmer blatantly saying he is not going to discuss him. However the grandson of Dr. James Mahan, Dean Mahan, claimed his grandfather could not have performed abortions at 3406 Brownsville Road in the 1920s and 1930s as the book claims because his grandfather had not lived on Brownsville Road at that time, which is supported by census records 1920 and 1940 both showing Dr. Mahan was living at 2400 Berg Street; the book does maintain that he rented rooms from the owners and did not reside there. According to Dean Mahan, his grandfather moved into a house on Brownsville Road in the 40s, his death certificate putting him 3233 Brownsville Road, not at 3406 Brownsville Road. Furthermore, there is no record of malpractice or illegal abortions even tied to Dr. Mahan because there is no official record of his being accused, arrested, tried, or convicted. [3] Cranmer claims in the book that Dr. M's nefarious practice was common knowledge in the community of Brentwood, (where his house is located), and that it was also the home of those who ran the notorious "South-Side numbers racket", along with numerous nightclubs, bars, and brothels.

== Aftermath ==
Since telling the story Cranmer's life has seen its share of tragedy. In March 2015 his son David died unexpectedly and his wife went into depression. They subsequently ended their marriage of 37 years in 2018. He is quoted as saying during an interview "writing the book was like outing the mob, there's obviously going to be consequences." He continues to do interviews about the book and his experience.

After over a decade of the house being cleared of evil, Bob opened it as a Bed & Breakfast in November 2019; "The Brownsville Road House".

== Adaptations ==
=== Television ===
The Demon of Brownsville Road has been the subject of a series of programs which are dramatizations:

- The Exorcist Files, The Discovery Channel (2011)
- Paranormal Witness, True Terror - The Molech, SyFy (2014)
- A Haunting, Demon's Lair, TLC (2016)

It was announced in 2015 that the Fox Network bought the rights to the story for one year and that a new series based on the book was to be aired in 2016. However, after the pilot episode was written Fox decided to cancel the project and move forward with another program.

=== Film ===
It was reported in the media (9/2019) that an option to produce a movie based on the book was sold to New Line Cinema, a division of Warner Brothers Entertainment.
