= Charles Caputo =

American politician

Charles N. Caputo

Member of the Pennsylvania House of Representatives from the 26th district
- In office January 7, 1969 – November 30, 1978
- Preceded by: District created
- Succeeded by: Michael Dawida

Member of the Pennsylvania House of Representatives from the Allegheny County district
- In office January 2, 1967 – November 30, 1968

Personal details
- Born: March 21, 1912 Pittsburgh, Pennsylvania
- Died: September 14, 1986 (aged 74) Harrisburg, Pennsylvania
- Party: Democratic

Charles Nicolo Caputo (March 21, 1912 – September 14, 1986) is a former Democratic member of the Pennsylvania House of Representatives.
