= Jessica Benham =

American politician and disability rights activist (born 1990)

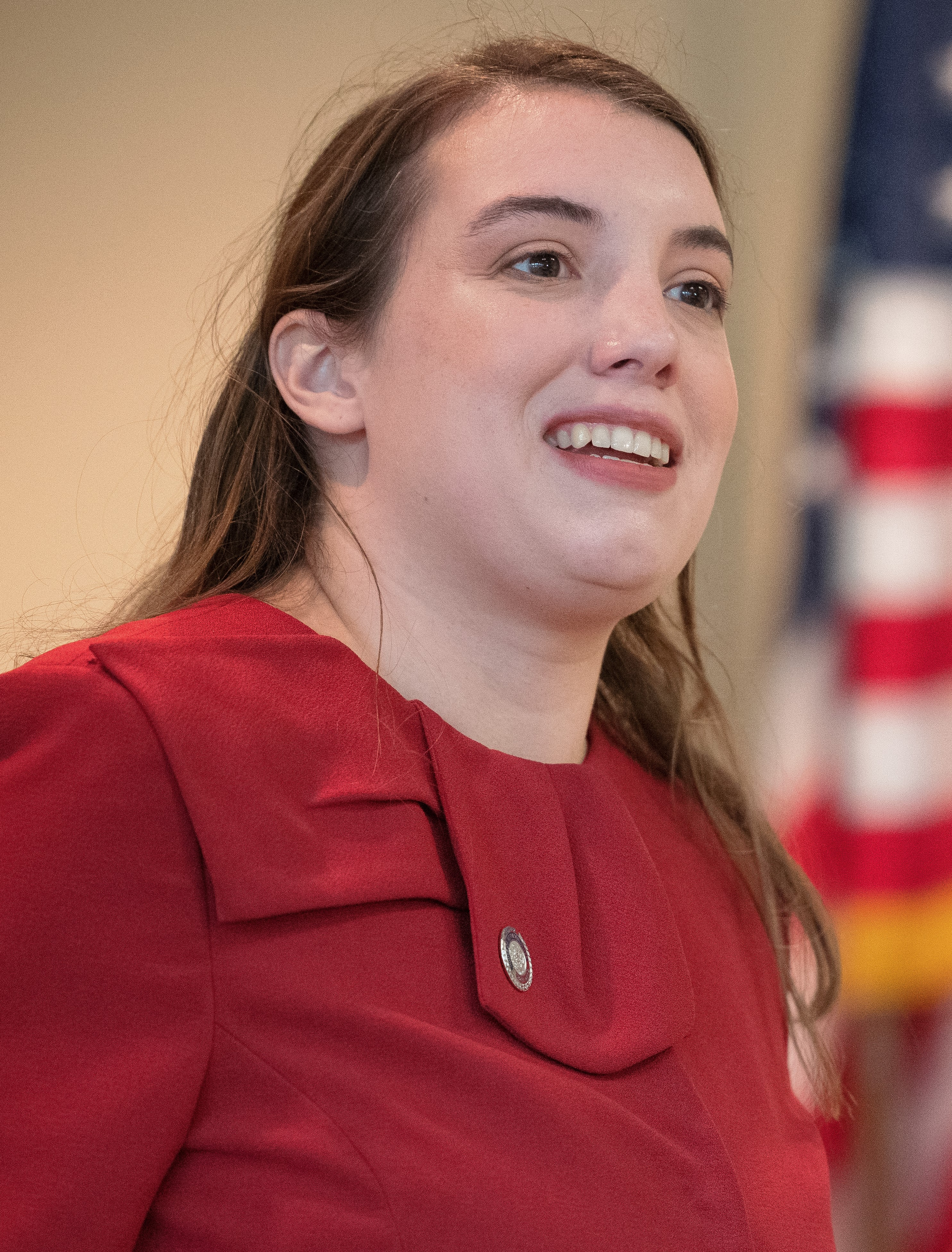
- Benham in 2021

Member of the Pennsylvania House of Representatives from the 36th district
- Incumbent
- Assumed office January 5, 2021
- Preceded by: Harry Readshaw

Personal details
- Born: December 13, 1990 (age 35)
- Party: Democratic
- Education: Bethel University (BA); Minnesota State University, Mankato (MA); University of Pittsburgh (MA, Ph.D)

Jessica L. Benham (born December 13, 1990) is an American politician and disability rights activist serving as a member of the Pennsylvania House of Representatives for the 36th District. She is the first openly LGBTQ+ woman and first openly autistic person elected to the Pennsylvania General Assembly. She co-founded the Pittsburgh Center for Autistic Advocacy in 2014.

== Education ==
Benham was homeschooled through highschool and competed for many years at the National Christian Forensics and Communications Association, advancing to the national level multiple years in a row.

Benham earned a bachelor's degree in political science and communication at Bethel University. She earned a master's degree in communication at Minnesota State University, Mankato and a master's degree in bioethics at University of Pittsburgh (Pitt). While at Pitt, she was a member of the organizing committee to start a union for graduate students. Benham holds a doctorate in communication from the University of Pittsburgh.

== Career ==
In 2014, Benham cofounded the Pittsburgh Center for Autistic Advocacy, where she served as the director of development. It is an LGBTQ+ autistic-led advocacy group, and the only LGBTQ+, autistic-led advocacy program in the greater Pittsburgh region. The group successfully advocates for state legislation, including Paul's Law which prohibits those with disabilities from being denied organ transplants.

Benham advocates for autistic rights, creates sensory friendly spaces, and increases access to individual education and 504 plans for autistic children in the public schooling system. She helps educators, parents, and healthcare workers to better understand those with autism, and reduces roadblocks to employment for autistic adults.

Through the PCAA and other mediums, Benham has worked to ensure the fair treatment of individuals with disabilities in the legislative system. She has consulted and provided feedback for the Pittsburgh City Council's gun legislation, state level healthcare efforts, and the endeavor to create autism designations on driver's licenses and license plates.

As a graduate from the University of Pittsburgh, Benham is involved in the organization of a graduate student union. She facilitates meetings and phone banking, and serves as the editor-in-chief of the committee newsletter.

In 2020, Benham defeated opponent AJ Doyle and was elected to the Pennsylvania House of Representatives for the 36th District, where she succeeded Harry Readshaw. She is bisexual, and is the first LGBTQ+ woman, and the first autistic person, elected to the Pennsylvania General Assembly. Her campaign focused on healthcare, workers' rights, and a clean environment. Benham received endorsements from local trades labor unions, including in the natural-gas industry. She brings her Devon Rex cat, Ravi, to work at the Capitol daily.

She has served as the Judge of Elections since 2018.

== Committee assignments ==
For the 2025-2026 Session, Benham sits on the following committees:

- Aging & Older Adult Services
  - Subcommittee on Programs & Benefits Chair
- Consumer Protection, Technology & Utilities
- Health
- Human Services
  - Subcommittee on Mental Health Chair
- Liquor Control
