= William W. Knight (politician) =

American politician

Member of the Pennsylvania House of Representatives from the 36th district
- In office 1979–1980
- Preceded by: Donald Abraham
- Succeeded by: Robert Horgos

Personal details
- Born: June 11, 1913 Homestead, Pennsylvania, United States
- Died: February 1, 1987 (aged 73) Munhall, Pennsylvania, United States
- Party: Democratic

William W. Knight (June 11, 1913 – February 1, 1987) was a Democratic member of the Pennsylvania House of Representatives.
