= William S. Moorhead =

American politician

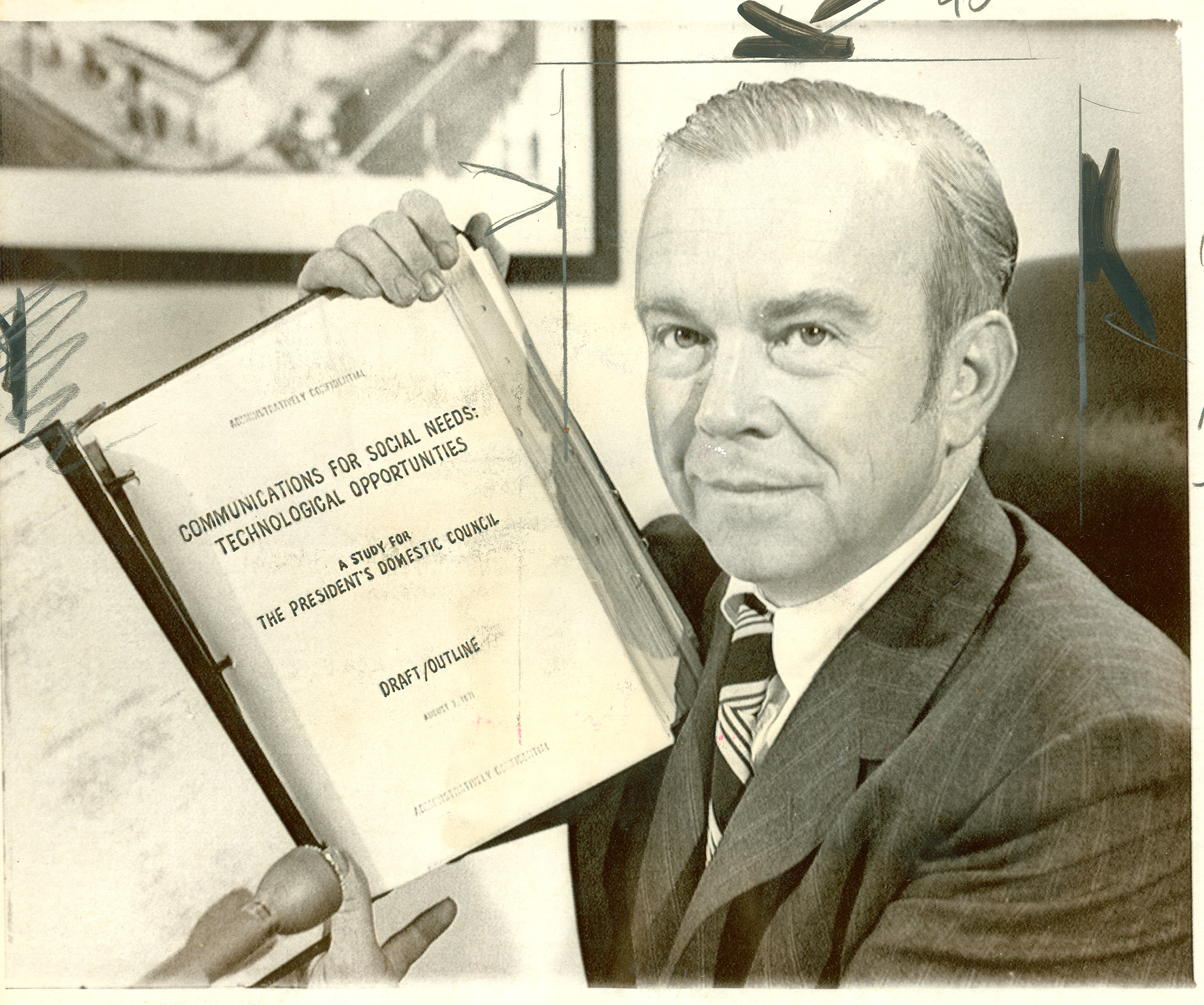

Member of the U.S. House of Representatives from Pennsylvania
- In office January 3, 1959 – January 3, 1981
- Preceded by: Herman P. Eberharter
- Succeeded by: William J. Coyne
- Constituency: 28th district (1959-1963); 14th district (1963-1981)

Personal details
- Born: William Singer Moorhead; April 8, 1923 Pittsburgh, Pennsylvania, U.S.
- Died: August 3, 1987 (aged 64) Baltimore, Maryland, U.S.
- Party: Democratic
- Spouse: Lucy Galpin
- Education: Yale University

William Singer Moorhead (April 8, 1923 – August 3, 1987) was an American politician serving as a Democratic member of the U.S. House of Representatives from the Commonwealth of Pennsylvania.

Moorhead was born in Pittsburgh, Pennsylvania, the son of prominent attorney William Singer Moorhead, Sr (1883–1952). He attended Shady Side Academy, graduated from Phillips Andover Academy in 1941 and from Yale University in 1944, where he was a member of Skull and Bones.

He served in the United States Navy from 1943 until he was discharged as a lieutenant (jg.) in 1946 with service in the Pacific Theater. Moorhead married the former Lucy Galpin, and they had four children. He graduated from Harvard Law School in 1949. He served as Assistant City Solicitor of Pittsburgh from 1954 to 1957, as a member of Allegheny County Housing Authority from 1956 to 1958, and the Pittsburgh Art Commission in 1958.

He was elected in 1958 as a Democrat to the 86th Congress and to the ten succeeding Congresses. Moorhead was a prominent critic of Pentagon cost overruns, a leader in establishing the National Endowments for the Arts and the Humanities, floor manager of freedom of information legislation that opened government documents to the public, and chief sponsor of the bill that established a synthetic fuels corporation. He also sponsored legislation to rescue New York City from its 1975 fiscal crisis.

He was not a candidate for reelection in 1980, and instead practiced law in the Washington firm of Coan, Couture, Lyons & Moorhead.

Moorhead died of lung cancer at Johns Hopkins Hospital in Baltimore in 1987; he was 64.

== Sources ==
- United States Congress. "William S. Moorhead (id: M000930)". Biographical Directory of the United States Congress.

U.S. House of Representatives
Preceded by Herman P. Eberharter	Member of the U.S. House of Representatives from Pennsylvania's 28th congressional district 1959–1963	Succeeded by District eliminated
Preceded by George M. Rhodes	Member of the U.S. House of Representatives from Pennsylvania's 14th congressional district 1963–1981	Succeeded by William J. Coyne
