= John I. McMonagle =

American politician

Member of the Pennsylvania House of Representatives from the 36th district
- In office 1969–1976
- Preceded by: District created
- Succeeded by: Donald Abraham

Member of the Pennsylvania House of Representatives from the Allegheny County district
- In office 1967–1968

Personal details
- Born: January 9, 1913 West Homestead, Pennsylvania
- Died: May 20, 1992 (aged 79)
- Party: Democratic

John I. McMonagle (January 9, 1913 – May 20, 1992) was a former Democratic member of the Pennsylvania House of Representatives.
