= James Romanelli =

American politician

James A. Romanelli

Member of the Pennsylvania Senate from the 43rd district
- In office November 17, 1975 – October 16, 1988
- Preceded by: Frank Mazzei
- Succeeded by: Michael M. Dawida
- Constituency: Parts of Allegheny County

Member of the Pennsylvania House of Representatives from the 22nd district
- In office 1973 – November 17, 1975
- Preceded by: William J. Coyne
- Succeeded by: Charles Logue

Personal details
- Born: July 8, 1929 Pittsburgh, Pennsylvania
- Died: October 16, 1988 (aged 59)
- Party: Democratic

James A. Romanelli (July 8, 1929 – October 16, 1988) is a former Democratic member of the Pennsylvania House of Representatives and the Pennsylvania State Senate.

A native of the South Side, Romanelli worked as a Pittsburgh city building inspector prior to elective office. He represented the 22nd legislative district in the Pennsylvania House of Representatives from 1973 through 1975. He was elected to represent the 43rd senatorial district in the Pennsylvania Senate in a 1975 special election. In 1982, he moved to Squirrel Hill in order to accommodate his mother and mother in law, who had moved in with him and his wife. In 1983, he suffered a mild stroke. He apologized after telling steelworkers at a Labor Day parade in Homestead that they should slash the tires on foreign cars.
