= Pennsylvania's 43rd Senate district =

American legislative district

Pennsylvania's 43rd State Senate district
Senator
Jay Costa; D–Forest Hills
- Population (2021): 251,870

Pennsylvania State Senate District 43 includes part of Allegheny County. It is currently represented by Democrat Jay Costa.

== District profile ==
The district includes the following areas:

Allegheny County:

- Braddock Hills
- Chalfont
- Churchill
- Edgewood
- Forest Hills
- Mount Oliver
- Oakmont
- Penn Hills Township
- Pittsburgh [PART, Wards 04, 05, 07, 08, 13, 14, 15, 16, 17, 18, 29, 30 and 31]
- Rankin
- Swissvale
- Verona
- Wilkins Township
- Wilkinsburg

== Senators ==
Representative	Party	Years	District home	Note	Counties
Joseph M. Barr	Democratic	1941–1960			Allegheny (part)
John H. Devlin	Democratic	1961–1967		Died on July 20, 1967	Allegheny (part)
Frank Mazzei	Democratic	1967–1975		Seated November 29, 1967 "Service terminated" on June 2, 1975.	Allegheny (part)
James A. Romanelli	Democratic	1975–1988		Seated November 17, 1975. Died October 16, 1988.	Allegheny (part)
Michael M. Dawida	Democratic	1989–1996		Resigned February 5, 1996	Allegheny (part)
Jay Costa, Jr.	Democratic	1996–present		Seated May 13, 1996	Allegheny (part)
