= Michael Dawida =

American politician

Michael M. Dawida

Member of the Allegheny County Board of Commissioners
- In office January 1, 1996 – December 31, 1999
- Preceded by: Pete Flaherty
- Succeeded by: Board Dissolved

Member of the Pennsylvania Senate from the 43rd district
- In office January 3, 1989 – February 5, 1996
- Preceded by: James Romanelli
- Succeeded by: Jay Costa
- Constituency: Part of Allegheny County

Member of the Pennsylvania House of Representatives from the 36th district
- In office January 4, 1983 – November 30, 1988
- Preceded by: Robert Horgos
- Succeeded by: Christopher McNally

Member of the Pennsylvania House of Representatives from the 26th district
- In office January 2, 1979 – November 30, 1982
- Preceded by: Charles Caputo
- Succeeded by: Eugene Saloom

Personal details
- Born: September 4, 1949 (age 77) UPMC Mercy; Pittsburgh, Pennsylvania
- Party: Democratic
- Spouse: Audrey M.
- Children: Three
- Education: University of Pittsburgh; Hamline University School of Law

Michael M. Dawida (born September 4, 1949) is a former Allegheny County Commissioner, member of the Pennsylvania House of Representatives, and the Pennsylvania State Senate.

== Education ==
A native of Carrick and a graduate of Carrick High School, he earned a history degree from University of Pittsburgh in 1971. From 1969 until 1977, Dawida was a childcare worker, working especially with delinquent teens and drug addicts. In 1977, he earned a Juris Doctor degree from Hamline University School of Law.

== Pennsylvania House of Representatives and Senate ==
He represented the 26th and 36th legislative districts in the Pennsylvania House of Representatives from 1979 to 1988. He represented the 43rd senatorial district in the Pennsylvania State Senate from 1989 to 1996.

== Allegheny County Commissioner ==
He was an Allegheny County Commissioner, alongside Bob Cranmer and Larry Dunn from 1996, until December 1999, when the Board of Commissioners was replaced with a County Executive as part of Allegheny County's Home Rule Charter. Cranmer split with his Republican running mate Larry Dunn over major differences concerning the managing of the county government, and formed a close governing alliance with Democrat commissioner Dawida. During their administration Mike Dawida and Bob Cranmer oversaw the rehabilitation and restoration of the famed Henry Hobson Richardson Allegheny County Jail designed in the late 1800s. The vacant and deteriorating structure was converted to house the new combined home of the juvenile and adult family sections of Allegheny County Common Pleas Court. The $46 million spent on the renovation project was nearly 23 times the original cost of both of the Richardsonian Romanesque masterpieces, the jail and county courthouse.

Cranmer and Mike Dawida worked cooperatively to achieve their city-county goals, and as the Pittsburgh Post-Gazette put it: "The partnership held strong through decisions that got county government back on track."

The combined leadership of Cranmer, Dawida, and Mayor Tom Murphy (Thomas J. Murphy, Jr.) led to a building boom in Pittsburgh dubbed "Renaissance III" that was a catalyst for how the city would be viewed a decade later when it was selected to host the 2009 G-20 summit, led by President Barack Obama. The Post-Gazette commented in 1998 that, "Allegheny County Commissioners Bob Cranmer and Mike Dawida understand the importance of a strong urban core and, through their partnership, have helped the mayor find ways to do what lesser leadership would considerable unthinkable...It is a meeting of such focused minds and willing spirits that stands to take Pittsburgh into a new era. Call it Renaissance III or call it just a better place to live, this is the blueprint of a renewable city that more people will be proud to call home."

In 1999 he ran unsuccessfully for the Democratic nomination for County Executive, losing to Cyril Wecht, who subsequently lost to Republican Jim Roddey in the general election. He is a professor at California University of Pennsylvania.
