= Donald Abraham =

American politician

Donald A. Abraham

Member of the Pennsylvania House of Representatives from the 36th district
- In office 1977–1978
- Preceded by: John I. McMonagle
- Succeeded by: William W. Knight

Personal details
- Born: September 26, 1930 Munhall, Pennsylvania, U.S.
- Died: July 24, 1978 (aged 47) Allegheny County, Pennsylvania, U.S.
- Party: Democratic

Donald A. Abraham (September 26, 1930 – July 24, 1978) was a Democratic member of the Pennsylvania House of Representatives.
