= Steve Seventy =

American politician

Member of the Pennsylvania House of Representatives from the 22nd district
- In office 1979–1988
- Preceded by: Charles Logue
- Succeeded by: Frank Gigliotti

Personal details
- Born: June 12, 1927 Pittsburgh, Pennsylvania
- Died: July 6, 1988 (aged 61) Pittsburgh, Pennsylvania
- Party: Democratic

Steve Seventy (June 12, 1927 – July 6, 1988) was a Democratic member of the Pennsylvania House of Representatives.

He died in office of pancreatic cancer in 1988.
