= Frank Mazzei =

American politician

- Mazzei in 1977

Member of the Pennsylvania Senate from the 43rd district
- In office November 29, 1967 – June 2, 1975
- Preceded by: John Devlin
- Succeeded by: James Romanelli
- Constituency: Parts of Allegheny County

Personal details
- Born: November 22, 1912 Greensburg, Pennsylvania
- Died: September 27, 1977 (aged 64) Magee-Womens Hospital
- Resting place: Queen of Heaven Cemetery; Peters Township
- Party: Democratic
- Spouse: Grace
- Children: Dominic

Frank Mazzei (November 22, 1912 – September 27, 1977) is a former Democratic member of the Pennsylvania State Senate. One of his big accomplishments during his political career was creation of the Pennsylvania Lottery. In 1975 he was arrested for taking kickbacks and was jailed until 1977.

== Biography ==
He began his career as a ward captain in the 17th ward in the South Side in Pittsburgh and later worked as a clerk and paymaster for the "Allegheny County Workhouse." He served as an alternate delegate to the Democratic National Convention in 1956 and 1964. He was a member of the Knights of Columbus.

He was elected to represent the 43rd senatorial district in the Pennsylvania State Senate in a special election in 1967. He was known as a "dapper dresser" and for his monogrammed shirts. He was powerful politician who rarely needed to campaign. His legislative career is best known for being the main force behind the creation of the Pennsylvania Lottery.

== Arrest and conviction ==
He was convicted on federal extortion charges for taking $20,000 in kickbacks on state office in the South Side space leased to BMI Corporation. He was acquitted of perjury charges in that same trial, but was sentenced to 1 to 5 years in prison on others. He was unanimously expelled from the Pennsylvania State Senate on June 2, 1975, making him the first person expelled from that chamber. He entered federal prison in December 1975.

== Release ==
He was paroled from a federal prison facility in Missouri in Spring 1977 because he was severely stricken with cancer. At the time of his death on September 27, 1977, he was awaiting a separate federal trial, with 69 co-defendants, in connection to a bail bond scheme.
