= James Huberty =

American mass murderer (1942-1984)

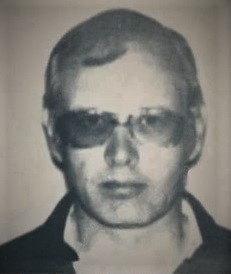
- Huberty, 1979
- Born: James Oliver Huberty; October 11, 1942; Canton, Ohio, U.S.
- Died: July 18, 1984 (aged 41); San Ysidro, San Diego, California, U.S.
- Cause of death: Killed by police gunfire
- Education: Waynedale High School; Pittsburgh Institute of Mortuary Science; Malone College
- Occupation: Welder
- Known for: Perpetrator of the San Ysidro McDonald's massacre
- Motive: Inconclusive (possibly rage, suicidal ideation, and/or revenge)

Details
- Date: July 18, 1984; Approximately 4:00 p.m. – 5:17 p.m. PDT
- Targets: Customers and employees at a McDonald's restaurant
- Killed: 21 (excluding the perpetrator)
- Injured: 19
- Weapons: 9mm Browning HP semi-automatic pistol; 9mm Uzi carbine; 12-gauge Winchester 1200 pump-action shotgun

James Oliver Huberty (October 11, 1942 – July 18, 1984) was an American mass murderer who perpetrated the San Ysidro McDonald's massacre, in which he killed 21 people and injured 19 others before being fatally shot by a police sniper. The massacre took place on July 18, 1984, at a McDonald's restaurant in the San Ysidro neighborhood of San Diego, California.

Born in Canton, Ohio, Huberty grew up in a family of farmers. He attended college and later worked in the funeral service industry before becoming a welder. He married Etna Markland in 1965, and the pair had two daughters. The family subsequently relocated several times, living in Ohio and later California.

On the afternoon of July 18, 1984, Huberty entered a McDonald's restaurant in San Ysidro armed with multiple firearms and began shooting customers and employees. The attack lasted approximately 77 minutes and resulted in 21 fatalities, making it one of the deadliest mass shootings in United States history at the time. Huberty was subsequently killed by a police sniper who had positioned himself outside the restaurant.

== Early life ==
James Oliver Huberty was born on October 11, 1942, in Canton, Ohio, to Earl Vincent Huberty and Icle Huberty. He was the youngest of two children and had an older sister named Ruth. His father worked at a steel mill while also attempting to maintain a farm in Mount Eaton, Ohio. Huberty contracted polio at the age of 3, which left him with a chronic limp. In 1950, when Huberty was seven years old, his mother left the family to become a Lutheran missionary in the western United States. In the wake of her departure, Huberty and his sister were raised by their father.

Huberty attended Mount Eaton Elementary School and later Waynedale High School, graduating in 1960. According to accounts, he was a reserved student who rarely participated in school activities and generally kept to himself. He subsequently enrolled at the Pittsburgh Institute of Mortuary Science in Pennsylvania, graduating with honors in 1964. He obtained a funeral director's license in 1964 and an embalmer's license the following year.

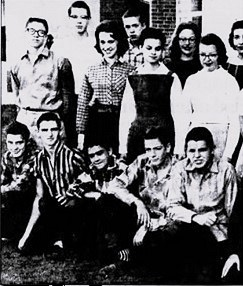
Huberty (upper left), photographed in a Waynedale High School photo, as a sophomore in 1958

Huberty initially worked in several funeral homes in Canton, Ohio, but eventually left the profession. He subsequently trained as a welder at Lincoln Electric Welding School in Cleveland and began working in manufacturing in 1966. In 1965, he married Etna Markland, whom he had met while attending Malone College. The couple had two daughters, Zelia and Cassandra. Thereafter, Huberty completed a sociology degree at Malone College in 1976, following approximately 16 years of part-time higher education.

== Adult life ==
While living in Massillon, Ohio, Huberty worked as a welder at the Babcock & Wilcox manufacturing company. He and his wife owned a house and a six unit apartment block. Huberty also tried to set up other businesses such as an apartment block. He was doing well financially for a number of years, however, there were economic problems affecting the manufacturing industry in the area and Huberty lost his welding job in late 1982 when the plant closed down.

Huberty and his family were left struggling financially. He had wanted to move to Baja California in Mexico to start a more affordable lifestyle, however, he struggled to get used to the area and couldn't speak Spanish. In late 1983, the family moved to San Ysidro, California. They lived in an apartment block close to the United States-Mexico border. After relocating to California, Huberty went on a security course and got a job as a security guard at a condominium in San Diego. He was fired on July 10, 1984, just a week before the San Ysidro McDonald's massacre. His wife stated that he started saying he was hearing voices.

=== Family life and behaviour ===
People who knew Huberty often described him as a withdrawn and short-tempered man. Former neighbours and coworkers recalled that he had few close friends and could become angry over relatively minor disagreements. Some also remembered his strong interest in firearms. Terry Kelly, a former coworker at Babcock & Wilcox, recalled that Huberty had pondered about shooting people and had made threatening remarks about his family if he could no longer support them.

His temper also affected life at home. Neighbours recalled hearing arguments between Huberty and his wife, Etna, and described their daughters as appearing uncomfortable around him. One neighbour told The Washington Post that the younger daughter had come to their home after an argument because she was afraid to return to the apartment. Etna later spoke about the abuse she experienced during their marriage. She spoke of an incident in which Huberty hurt her jaw and said that she had sometimes feared for her safety. She also described an incident in February 1984 involving their elder daughter, Zelia, which further heightened her concerns about the family's safety. In spite of their harsh relationship, Etna said that the girls still had love for their father.

For several years, Etna had attempted to persuade her husband to seek counselling. She began doing so in 1976, hoping that it might help with his temper and personal difficulties, but he denied doing so. In a statement after the massacre, she described him as a nervous man who struggled to deal with pressure. She also spoke about the difficulties he had experienced during the family's final months in California. Neighbours in San Ysidro also recollected several confrontations involving Huberty. Some described him as unfriendly and difficult to approach, while others reported arguments with his wife and disruptive behaviour around the apartment complex. These accounts painted a picture of a man whose increasingly strained relationships had affected both his family and those living nearby.

== San Ysidro McDonald's massacre ==
On July 18, 1984, Huberty perpetrated the San Ysidro McDonald's massacre at a McDonald's restaurant on San Ysidro Boulevard in San Ysidro, California. The attack lasted approximately 77 minutes, during which Huberty killed 21 people, including children, and injured 19 others. The victims included restaurant employees and customers.

The attack ended when Huberty was fatally shot by a San Diego Police Department sniper. He was 41 years old. The massacre became one of the deadliest mass shootings in United States history and received extensive national and international media coverage. The full circumstances of the attack are covered in the main article, San Ysidro McDonald's massacre.

== Death ==
Huberty was killed on July 18, 1984, by a San Diego Police Department sniper during the San Ysidro McDonald's massacre. He was 41 years old. His body was transported to a funeral home in San Diego, where his family privately arranged for him to be cremated. No formal funeral service was held. Huberty was cremated on July 23, 1984. His widow, Etna, subsequently obtained permission to transport his ashes to Ohio. However, in August 1984, she stated that she had not buried or scattered them and was still keeping them in her possession.

== Aftermath ==
After the massacre, Huberty's wife and daughters were subjected to public scrutiny and abuse. Etna Huberty received death threats and it was hard for the family to settle into life after the event. Eventually, his widow returned to Ohio with her daughters and his ashes but later moved back to the San Diego area. The family subsequently relocated within San Diego County. Their daughters experienced harassment at school and attended under a different surname. By 1994, Etna Huberty was living with her two adult daughters in Spring Valley, California.

== See also ==
- Mass shootings in the United States
- List of rampage killers in the United States
