= Francis O'Brien =

Francis or Fran O'Brien may refer to:

== Politics ==
- Francis O'Brien (Canadian politician) (born 1927), Canadian politician and farmer
- Francis O'Brien (Irish politician) (born 1943), Irish Fianna Fáil politician

== Sport ==
- Francis O'Brien (cricketer) (1911–1991), New Zealand cricketer
- Fran O'Brien (American football) (1936–1999), American National Football League player
- Fran O'Brien (footballer) (born 1955), Irish footballer

== Other ==
- Francis O'Brien, executive producer of Gallipoli (1981 film)

== See also ==
- Frank O'Brien (disambiguation)
