= Bob Cranmer =

American businessman and politician

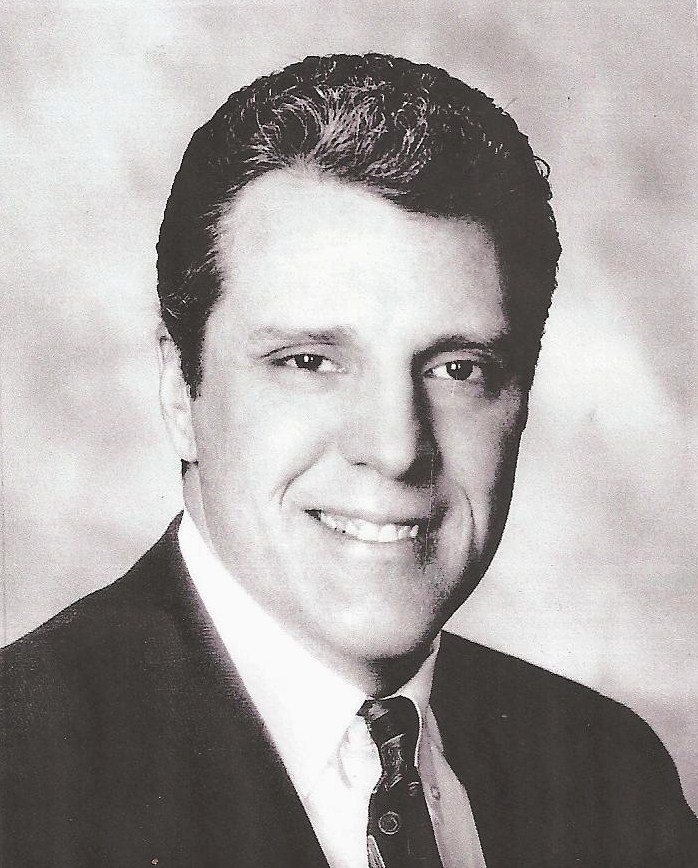
- Cranmer in 1996

Member of the Allegheny County Board of Commissioners
- In office January 1, 1996 – December 31, 1999
- Preceded by: Tom Foerster
- Succeeded by: Board dissolved

Chair of the Allegheny County Republican Party
- In office 1994–1996
- Preceded by: Henry Sneath
- Succeeded by: David Hamstead^{[a]}

Personal details
- Born: Robert Wesley Cranmer; July 24, 1956 (age 70) Pittsburgh, Pennsylvania, U.S.
- Party: Republican
- Spouse: Lesa Cranmer (1980–2018)
- Education: Duquesne University
- Profession: U.S. Army officer, AT&T Corporation sales and marketing, government consultant
- Awards: (3) Meritorious Service Medal; Army Commendation Medal; Army Achievement Medal; Parachutist Badge; Air Assault Badge

Military service
- Allegiance: United States of America
- Branch/service: United States Army; Military Intelligence Corps (United States Army)
- Years of service: 1978–1986 (Active) 1987–1991 (Reserve) 1992–1998 (IRR)
- Rank: MAJor
- Commands: B Company, 311th MI BN (CEWI), 101st Airborne Division (Air Assault), Ft. Campbell, KY; Special Security Detachment, Ft. Belvoir, VA; 3rd PSYOPS Company, 97th ARCOM, Pittsburgh, PA
- a.Jane McMullen took over as Acting Chairperson following Cranmer's resignation, and served until Hamstead was elected as Cranmer's permanent successor in April 1996.

Robert Wesley "Bob" Cranmer (born 1956, in Pittsburgh, Pennsylvania) is a veteran, businessman, author, and politician, best known as a former Republican County Commissioner of Allegheny County, Pennsylvania, from 1996 to 2000. He is the author of the horror novel The Demon of Brownsville Road.

== Career ==
The son of a retired military officer, Cranmer graduated from Brentwood High School in 1974 and received a Bachelor of Science degree in secondary education and history from Duquesne University in 1978. After service as a United States Army officer where one of his assignments was as a company commander with the 101st Airborne Division, he returned home and was elected to Brentwood Council in 1991.

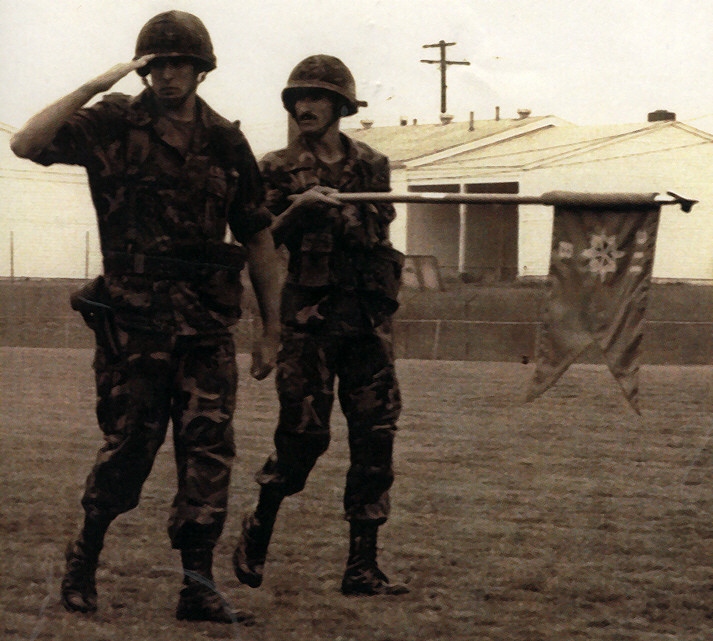
Bob Cranmer, Commanding Officer, Company B, 311th M.I. Battalion (CEWI), 101st Airborne Division (Air Assault), 1982.

== Brentwood Towne Square ==
In 1991 Cranmer ran for a seat on Brentwood council stating that he would bring a new grocery store to the community. But after his election Cranmer found his campaign promise was easier said than done when grocery chains he contacted disparaged the condition of the current shopping center and the topography of the land where it sat. Understanding that the Brentwood-Whitehall Shopping Center was in an advanced state of deterioration (and had fallen into bankruptcy), he initiated a plan to create an economic development corporation (Brentwood Economic Development Corporation, later expanded and renamed Economic Development South) to work with developers in addressing the commercial needs of Brentwood (specifically) and later expanded to serve other communities in the South Hills of Allegheny County.

Working with Allegheny County (Cranmer, later as a county commissioner), Kappa Properties, and Giant Eagle this corporation undertook a development plan to demolish and rebuild this primary business district, eventually creating a $32 million development which became known as "Brentwood Towne Square or Center".

== Brentwood vs. TCI Cable ==
He gained the attention of the national media in 1993 when he challenged the operating practices of the media giant TCI Cable. The firm, which had contracted with Brentwood to provide cable television services, added without notice or approval two explicitly adult (pay-per-view) channels, Playboy TV and Spice Networks, and was done to test market the service. When a subscriber television was turned on it would automatically "default" to one of the adult channels, each being lightly scrambled but still providing full uncensored audio. These "mechanical" features made contact with the channels unavoidable, making children vulnerable to programming designed explicitly for adult viewers.

Cranmer claimed that this was done as a ploy to entice viewers to subscribe while subjecting all viewers to the adult content, including children. He also based his objections on an existing borough ordnance that prohibited the sale of sexually explicit magazines, videos, or performances. In signing a contract with the borough, TCI had agreed to abide by all borough laws and regulations and that they were now violating the ordnance by providing "home delivery service" of pornographic material. Brentwood borough and TCI eventually came to an out-of-court agreement in which the channels would be further scrambled and blocked entirely upon request of the subscriber.

== Teresa Heinz – Rick Santorum controversy ==
In 1994, he was elected chairman of the Republican Party of Allegheny County. In October of that year Cranmer again gained the national spotlight when Teresa Heinz, the wife of the late Senator John Heinz, a Republican, and later wife of presidential candidate John Kerry, publicly endorsed Democratic incumbent Senator Harris Wofford, who had been appointed to the seat by Governor Bob Casey following her husband's death. She called the Republican candidate, Congressman Rick Santorum, "Forrest Gump with an attitude" and labeled him much too conservative for Pennsylvania.

The same day that her endorsement made the Pennsylvania newspapers Cranmer issued a press release which included a letter from him to Mrs. Heinz (who was, at that time, a registered Republican), asking her to change her voter registration to the Democratic Party; he also included a voter registration form. Cranmer's letter helped him gain notoriety, as it was seen as emblematic of the betrayal felt by State Republicans.

== Jonny Gammage incident ==
In 1995 during his campaign for county commissioner, two Brentwood Police officers were involved in an incident during which a young black man named Jonny Gammage of Syracuse, New York, was killed during a routine traffic stop. Gammage was the cousin of Ray Seals, a player for the Pittsburgh Steelers football team. The controversy surrounding the death made the national news and racial tension rose to a fever pitch in Pittsburgh.

Cranmer, who had been at odds with the Brentwood police as a councilman, denounced the police conduct and when pressured leveled accusations that Brentwood had a history racist incidents. He and his family were castigated by members of the community and contemplated moving but eventually did not. After several trials and mistrials, all of the police officers were eventually acquitted in the case. Many in the community never forgave Cranmer for his statements.

== Allegheny County Commissioner ==
Cranmer went on to be elected County Commissioner in November 1995 in a landmark election and was thought to be a firebrand conservative. Being a member of the first Republican majority in Allegheny County government since the Great Depression, Cranmer subsequently split with his Republican running mate Larry Dunn over major differences concerning the managing of the county government, and formed a close governing alliance with Democrat commissioner Mike Dawida.

He was heralded as a "traitor" to Republicans by commissioner Dunn, who subsequently (unlike Cranmer), switched parties and became a registered Democrat to run for county controller in 2003. In summary, the Post-Gazette stated "that despite the political suicide he brought upon himself, this was the turning point that helped the county recover from earlier mistakes".

As a commissioner he made significant changes to county government, reducing county taxes by 20 percent, reducing county personnel by 18%, merging twenty-eight county departments into six, creating the position of County Manager, an integrated county 9-1-1 system, and forming a joint city/county economic development organization. The economic development organization is most notable for the coordination and construction of The Waterfront business/commercial/residential development with Continental Real Estate-Development, on the former site of the United States Steel Homestead Works.

== New county government and legacy ==
He led an effort to establish home rule in Allegheny County, which created the position of county executive and county council after coming to the conclusion that a new structure of government was needed. This initiative was based upon a study set into motion by former county commissioners Tom Foerster and Pete Flaherty in 1995. They had established a committee chaired by the then chancellor of Duquesne University, John E. Murray Jr. called "ComPAC 21", (The Committee to Prepare Allegheny County for the 21st Century). Their report laid the plan for a completely new organizational structure of county government. He also initiated the creation of the Allegheny County Airport Authority to manage the Pittsburgh International Airport in a more effective, professional manner.

During their administration Mike Dawida and Bob Cranmer also oversaw the rehabilitation and restoration of the famed Henry Hobson Richardson Allegheny County Jail designed in the late 1800s. The vacant and deteriorating structure was converted to house the new combined home of the juvenile and adult family sections of Allegheny County Common Pleas Court. The $46 million spent on the renovation project was nearly 23 times the original cost of both of the Richardsonian Romanesque masterpieces, the jail and county courthouse.

Cranmer and Mike Dawida worked cooperatively to achieve their city-county goals, and as the Pittsburgh Post-Gazette put it: "The partnership held strong through decisions that got county government back on track."

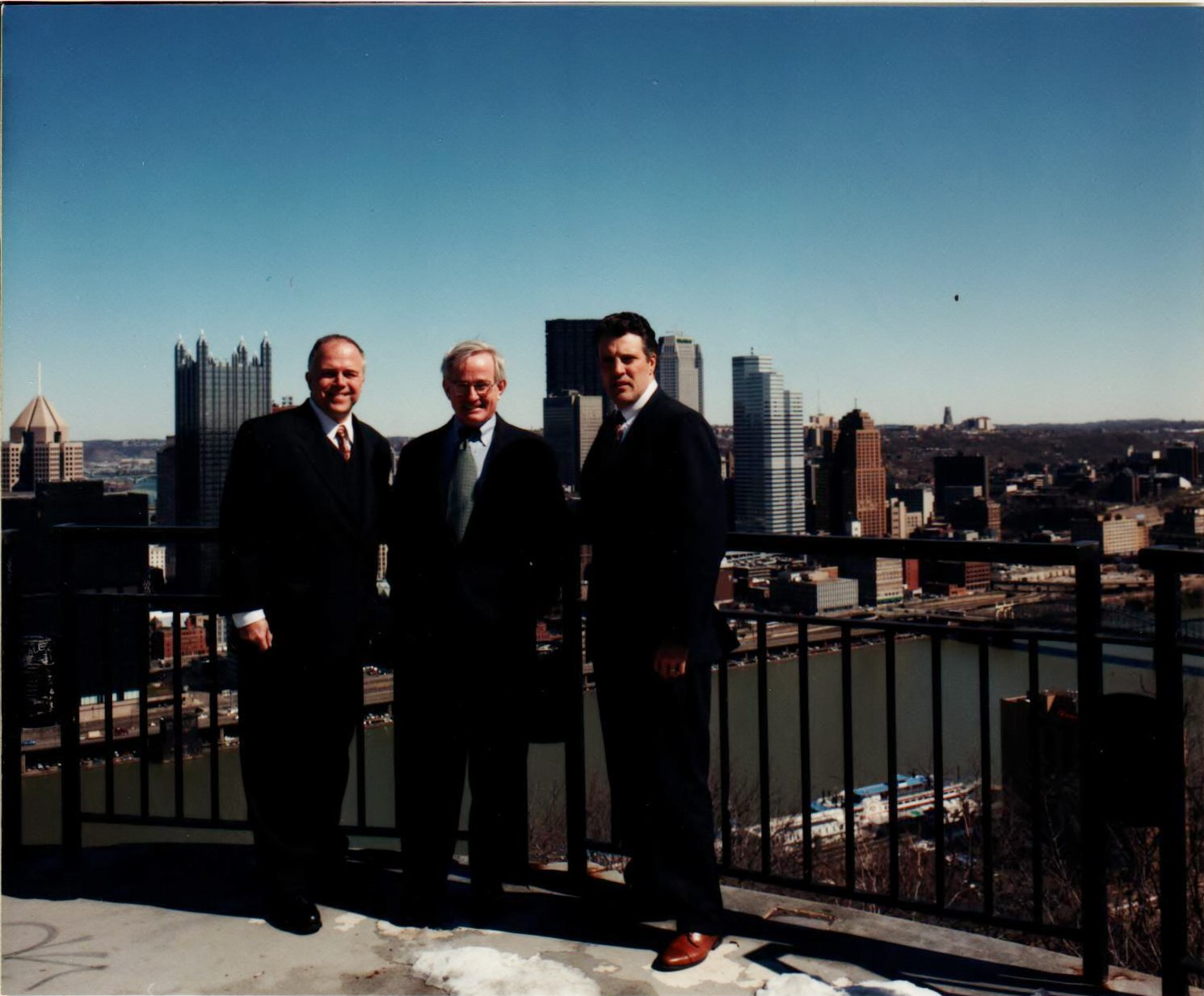
L-R, Mike Dawida – Tom Murphy – Bob Cranmer, 1999.

The combined leadership of Cranmer, Dawida, and Mayor Tom Murphy (Thomas J. Murphy Jr.) led to a building boom in Pittsburgh dubbed "Renaissance III" that was a catalyst for how the city would be viewed a decade later when it was selected to host the 2009 G-20 summit, led by President Barack Obama. The Post-Gazette commented in 1998 that Allegheny County Commissioners Bob Cranmer and Mike Dawida understand the importance of a strong urban core and, through their partnership, have helped the mayor find ways to do what lesser leadership would considerable unthinkable. It is a meeting of such focused minds and willing spirits that stands to take Pittsburgh into a new era. Call it Renaissance III or call it just a better place to live, this is the blueprint of a renewable city that more people will be proud to call home."

Cranmer's tenure in office had an impact upon the size, structure, and cost of county government. The Post-Gazette would later sum up his time in office with the following when he announced that he would not seek reelection: "By thinning the field and working toward the day when Republicans have a single alternative to the policies of ill-conceived tax cuts, reactionary thinking and government-as-usual, Commissioner Cranmer has made the ultimate political sacrifice. If that is the mark of a citizen-lawmaker – to be honest, to spurn patronage, to reform the public sector and then get out – this commissioner has been one such leader. Allegheny County could use a few more Bob Cranmers." He was followed in office by Jim Roddey, the first Allegheny County Executive. Papers and associated historical records concerning Cranmer's term in office are filed at the Heinz History Center, (archival storage) in Pittsburgh.

The following comments were made upon his departure from office: (I) found Cranmer to be "very forthright." "I was impressed with his integrity. I just saw him develop his knowledge. You always felt that you get an honest answer from him." Moe Coleman, Retired director of the Institute for Politics at the University of Pittsburgh "A fascinating political figure who contravened earlier predictions. When he was first elected, people thought he would be a rabble-rousing, right-wing Christian Coalition partisan and he turned out to be anything but. He proved to be a very complicated – almost enigmatic – political figure. He's clearly someone who listened to his own drummer." Jon Delano, Democrat political analyst Though Cranmer's decision to split from Dunn probably cost him his political future, Green said he should get credit for it. "It was a very difficult personal decision but he did it because it was right for the county." Bill Green, Republican political consultant

He worked for several firms after leaving office (in government relations) and in July 2009 he established "Cranmer Consultants", a government and legislative affairs company. In 2000, Cranmer was inducted into the Sons of the American Revolution after he traced his lineage back to Noadiah Cranmer who fought in the American Revolutionary War, and served as president of the Pittsburgh chapter for two years.

== Plan B ==
The Pittsburgh Steelers and the Pittsburgh Pirates sports teams shared Three Rivers Stadium from 1970 to 2000. After discussions over the Pittsburgh Pirates building a full-time baseball park, a proposal was made to renovate Three Rivers Stadium into a full-time football facility. Though this met with negative reaction from Steelers ownership, the proposal was used as a "fallback position" that would be used if discussions for a new stadium failed.

Steelers ownership stated that failing to build a new stadium would hurt the franchise's chances of signing players who might opt to sign with other teams, such as the other four teams in the Steelers division who had all recently built new football-only stadiums.

Originally, a ten-county half percent sales tax increase was proposed by the Allegheny Conference on Community Development to fund three projects: Heinz Field, PNC Park, and a major expansion of the David L. Lawrence Convention Center, along with other regional public works infrastructure improvements in all ten counties. After the rejection of this proposal in a referendum, Cranmer, Mike Dawida and Pittsburgh Mayor Tom Murphy developed Plan B which involved no "new" taxation. The source of the funding would be the Allegheny County Regional Asset District which already collected a one percent sales tax in Allegheny County. The county commissioners were required to be involved if this revenue was to be used for the projects.

Thus Cranmer became a central figure to the plan's formulation and success. Similarly controversial, the alternative proposal was labeled Scam B by opponents. The Steelers' pledge toward the new stadium was criticized for being too little, even after it was raised from $50 million to $76.5 million. Other local government members criticized the $281 million of public money allocated for Plan B.

The lone Republican, Cranmer's support was seen as key for the plan to succeed. He had initially stated that he would not use tax money to build stadiums but later clarified his position to mean revenue collected from "property taxes". This was due to his discovery that a portion of the Regional Asset District Tax was specifically designated for the "construction and maintenance" of sports facilities. However, he was determined to put together the best deal possible and led the final negotiations with the Steelers personally."It was time to make a deal. If it wasn't made then, it probably wouldn't have gotten done. When you make a compromise, there are things you want and things you don't get," Art Rooney (Art Rooney II) of the Steelers said. Governor Tom Ridge then went to work in Harrisburg personally lobbying the legislature to approve the last remaining critical component. The agreement involved one third funding by the state and required an increase in the state's debt ceiling to fund its portion of the deal. After great controversy and raucous debate he succeeded. The plan never would have been completed without the personal efforts and involvement of the governor.

The plan met with criticism and opposition from Fred Baker, a member of the Regional Asset District Board. When Baker made clear his opposition to the plan, Cranmer asked for his resignation. After resigning, Baker ran for a seat on the new County Council to continue opposing Cranmer's plans. One member of the Allegheny Regional Asset District board called the use of tax dollars "corporate welfare".

The plan, totaling $809 million, was approved by the Allegheny Regional Asset District board on July 9, 1998, with $233 million allotted for Heinz Field. Shortly after Plan B was approved, the Steelers and the Pirates signed leases to stay in the city until at least 2031. The total cost of Heinz Field was $281 million, with the Pittsburgh Steelers paying for all costs over the original budgeted amount.

Due to his support for Plan B his popularity with Republican voters dropped significantly and he announced in early 1999 that he would not run for the newly created position of county executive. He was both praised and reviled for his role in Plan B with much of his other work going unnoticed by the general electorate. Many Republicans also would not forgive him for working cooperatively with the Democrats.

In 1999 Cranmer did not agree to a similar deal with the Pittsburgh Penguins hockey team which guaranteed that a funding plan would be in place by 2002 to build a new hockey arena. He maintained that there would be no money to support such a financial plan without a tax increase and was against committing the future government to such a financial responsibility.

== 2003 arrest ==
On September 14, 2003, police were called to Cranmer's home in Brentwood at 11:30 pm by Cranmer's 14-year-old son Charles, where Cranmer was arrested after a dispute with his 19-year-old son Robert Cranmer Jr.

In an affidavit one arresting officer alleged that his son was "in a state of semiconsciousness to the degree that he could not reply to my questioning", and Cranmer admitted at the time to having punched his son in the face. His son was examined by paramedics and taken to Jefferson Memorial Hospital, and Cranmer was charged with simple assault, arraigned in Night Court by Senior District Justice Leonard Boehm and released on his own recognizance the following morning from the Allegheny County Jail.

Cranmer's wife Lesa and son Charles gave statements to police alleging that Cranmer had assaulted his son, following a dispute over the use of Cranmer's bathroom by his son Robert. Cranmer asserted that his actions were in self-defense, and that his son suffered from bipolar disorder which caused him to become violent.

In November 2003 Cranmer's court hearing on the assault charges were postponed for thirty days by the District Justice hearing the case, after the court was told that Cranmer and his family were undergoing counselling. The charges were later dropped.

== Lawsuits ==
In 1998 former investigator in the county public defender's office Geary M. Conley sued Cranmer, his colleague Larry Dunn, the Allegheny County Solicitor and the Acting Public Defender, alleging that he was fired in 1996 for political reasons. The Solicitor and the Acting Public Defender were replaced later (in 1996) as well.

In 2009, it was reported that Cranmer was expected to testify in a lawsuit against the county by former county recreation manager Mike Diehl. The lawsuit claimed that Cranmer fired Diehl for political reasons.

In February 2009 Cranmer testified at great length that Diehl was dismissed specifically for his mismanagement, in that county employees were living in county-owned homes at reduced rent rates or without paying any rent at all (as officially reported by the office of the Allegheny County Controller). An audit by the county controller found that the county was owed at least $39,000 in rental payments and late-payment penalties. Cranmer ordered that Diehl (a 25-year county employee) and the three employees who were living in the houses be dismissed as a result.

Despite Cranmer's testimony that his action was in no way related to Diehl's political affiliation the jury awarded Diehl $144,000 in compensatory damages for emotional distress, embarrassment, harm to his reputation and humiliation.

== Photographer ==
After leaving office Cranmer set out to record in pictures what he called "the amazingly unique scenery and architecture of Allegheny County." He compiled these photos into a book which he titled "The World through a Pittsburgh lens" in 2009.

== Author ==
After leaving political office Cranmer wrote numerous op-ed articles and one historical research piece about George Washington in Western Pennsylvania. In 2014 he published a horror novel titled The Demon of Brownsville Road.

Political offices
Preceded by Tom Foerster	Member of the Allegheny County Board of Commissioners; 1996–1999	Succeeded by Board Dissolved
Party political offices
Preceded by Henry Sneath	Chairperson of the Allegheny County Republican Party; 1994–1996	Succeeded by David Hamstead^{1}
Notes and references
1. Immediately succeeded as Acting Chairperson by Jane McMullen, who served until Hamstead was formally elected.
