= Robert Horgos =

American politician

Robert P. Horgos

Member of the Pennsylvania House of Representatives from the 36th district
- In office 1981–1982
- Preceded by: William W. Knight
- Succeeded by: Michael Dawida

Personal details
- Born: May 17, 1948 (age 78) Pittsburgh, Pennsylvania, United States
- Party: Democratic

Robert P. Horgos (born May 17, 1948) is a former Democratic member of the Pennsylvania House of Representatives.
