= 1993 Kenosha McDonald's shooting =

Shooting in Wisconsin, US

- Location: 42.566°N 87.888°W; 7530 Pershing Road; Kenosha, Wisconsin, US
- Date: August 10, 1993; 1:30 am CDT (UTC-06:00)
- Attack type: Murder-suicide; shooting
- Weapons: 8-3/8” stainless-steel .44 Magnum Smith & Wesson Model 629 revolver; .223-caliber Colt AR-15 semi-automatic rifle (unused; found discarded)
- Deaths: 3 (including the perpetrator)
- Injuries: 1
- Perpetrator: Dion Terres

On August 10, 1993, a shooting occurred at a McDonald’s restaurant in Kenosha, Wisconsin, United States. At 1:30 am CDT, 25-year-old Dion Terres walked into the McDonald's restaurant with a .44 Magnum revolver and killed two people and injured a third before committing suicide.

== Background ==
The attack occurred a month after the ninth anniversary of the 1984 San Ysidro McDonald's massacre and 15 months after the 1992 Sydney River McDonald's murders.

There were 20-30 employees and customers in the restaurant at the time the attack took place.

== Shooting ==
On August 10, 1993, Dion Terres, dressed in military fatigues, drove his 1989 Chevrolet Cavalier from his home to the McDonald's restaurant at 7530 Pershing Rd., arriving at around 1:30 p.m. While getting out his car with his Colt AR-15 rifle in hand, Terres accidentally locked himself out of his car, leaving a loaded 30-round magazine for the rifle on the passenger seat; police later discovered another 30-round magazine in his breast pocket. According to the Kenosha County deputy chief medical examiner, Terres had marijuana in his system at the time of the shooting, but it was not possible to tell if Terres had smoked marijuana shortly before the attack or had ingested it as long as a month earlier.

Believing his rifle was now unusable without a magazine (forgetting the other magazine in his pocket), he discarded the rifle next to his car at the parking lot before heading into the restaurant from a side door while brandishing a long-barreled stainless-steel .44 Magnum Smith & Wesson Model 629 revolver. Terres yelled at everyone to leave the restaurant before he first shot Bruce Bojesen in the head, killing him instantly, then shot and wounded both Sandra Kenaga in the abdomen and Kirk Hauptmann in the wrist. After shooting the victims, Terres shot fatally himself through the mouth.

== Victims ==
=== Killed ===
- Bruce Kell Bojesan (50): A self-employed carpenter who lived in Silver Lake; fatally shot and died instantly.
- Sandra Mardoian Kenaga (42): A local hair salon owner in Kenosha and a cousin of Kenosha Mayor John Antaramian; succumbed to her injuries the following day.

=== Injured ===
- Kirk Hauptmann (18): Survived with a minor gunshot wound to his hand.

== Perpetrator ==
Dion Terres (October 2, 1967 – August 10, 1993) was a 25-year-old male from Arlington Heights, Illinois. After he graduated from John Hersey High School in Arlington Heights in 1986, he reportedly bragged to former classmates about joining the military, though investigations later revealed he never actually served. Terres moved to Kenosha from Arlington Heights in September 1992, about 11 months prior to the shooting.

He was previously a cellular phone assembler at a Motorola manufacturing plant in Libertyville, Illinois, but in March 1993, he was terminated from his job after failing to show up to work for three consecutive days without explanation. Shortly after in March 1993, he bought the Colt AR-15 rifle at Eagle Training Gun Shop in Kenosha. Terres previously bought the Smith & Wesson Model 629 .44 Magnum revolver in 1989 at Maxon Shooters Supply in Mount Prospect, Illinois.

According to his ex-girlfriend, 16-year-old Kimberly Sinkler, A few days before the shooting, Terres had become enraged when a Jehovah's Witness missionary came to his door. He threatened to shoot the man, then ran upstairs, jumped into his fatigues and dashed back downstairs brandishing his rifle. By the time he reached the door, the missionary had left.

After the shooting, Terres was looked into as a possible suspect in the Brown's Chicken massacre that happened on January 8, 1993 in Palatine, Illinois. Police conclude that no link had been made to connect Terres to the shooting.
