= Charles Logue (politician) =

American politician

Member of the Pennsylvania House of Representatives from the 22nd district
- In office 1976–1978
- Preceded by: James Romanelli
- Succeeded by: Steve Seventy

Personal details
- Born: June 22, 1922 Pittsburgh, Pennsylvania
- Died: July 6, 2000 (aged 78) Allegheny County, Pennsylvania
- Party: Democratic

Charles T. Logue (1922-2000) was a Democratic member of the Pennsylvania House of Representatives. He was born in Pittsburgh in 1922.

He was first elected in April 1976
