= Pennsylvania House of Representatives, District 36 =

American legislative district

Pennsylvania's 36th State House of Representatives district
Representative
| Jessica Benham; D–Pittsburgh |
- Population (2022): 61,727

The 36th Pennsylvania House of Representatives District is located in southwestern Pennsylvania and has been represented since 2021 by Jessica Benham.

== District profile ==
The 36th Pennsylvania House of Representatives District is located in Allegheny County and includes the following areas:

- Brentwood
- Mount Oliver
- Pittsburgh (part)
  - Ward 16
  - Ward 17 (part)
    - Division 04
    - Division 05
    - Division 06
    - Division 07
    - Division 08
  - Ward 18 (part)
    - Division 01
  - Ward 19 (part)
    - Division 11
    - Division 12
    - Division 14
    - Division 15
    - Division 16
    - Division 17
    - Division 18
    - Division 19
    - Division 20
    - Division 21
    - Division 22
    - Division 23
    - Division 24
    - Division 25
    - Division 26
    - Division 27
    - Division 29
    - Division 30
    - Division 31
    - Division 32
    - Division 33
    - Division 34
    - Division 35
    - Division 36
    - Division 37
    - Division 38
  - Ward 29
  - Ward 32

== Representatives ==
| Representative | Party | Years | District home | Note |
Prior to 1969, seats were apportioned by county.
| John I. McMonagle | Democrat | 1969 – 1976 | | |
| Donald A. Abraham | Democrat | 1977 – 1978 | | |
| William W. Knight | Democrat | 1979 – 1980 | | |
| Robert P. Horgos | Democrat | 1981 – 1982 | | |
| Michael M. Dawida | Democrat | 1983 – 1988 | | |
| Christopher K. McNally | Democrat | 1989 – 1994 | | |
| Harry Readshaw | Democrat | 1995 – 2020 | Pittsburgh | |
| Jessica Benham | Democrat | 2021 – Present | Pittsburgh | Incumbent |

== Recent election results ==
PA House election, 2024: Pennsylvania House, District 36
| Party | Candidate | Votes | % |
|---|---|---|---|
| Democratic | Jessica Benham (incumbent) | 22,253 | 78.82 |
| Libertarian | Ross Sylvester | 5,981 | 21.18 |
| Total votes | | 28,234 | 100.00 |
| Democratic hold | | | |

PA House election, 2022: Pennsylvania House, District 36
| Party | Candidate | Votes | % |
|---|---|---|---|
| Democratic | Jessica Benham (incumbent) | 17,385 | 78.79 |
| Libertarian | Ross Sylvester | 4,681 | 21.21 |
| Total votes | | 22,066 | 100.00 |
| Democratic hold | | | |

PA House election, 2020: Pennsylvania House, District 36
| Party | Candidate | Votes | % |
|---|---|---|---|
| Democratic | Jessica Benham | 20,076 | 62.61 |
| Republican | AJ Doyle | 11,988 | 37.39 |
| Total votes | | 32,064 | 100.00 |
| Democratic hold | | | |

PA House election, 2018: Pennsylvania House, District 36
| Party | Candidate | Votes | % |
|---|---|---|---|
| Democratic | Harry Readshaw (incumbent) | Unopposed | |
| Total votes | | 19,173 | 100.00 |
| Democratic hold | | | |

PA House election, 2016: Pennsylvania House, District 36
| Party | Candidate | Votes | % |
|---|---|---|---|
| Democratic | Harry Readshaw (incumbent) | Unopposed | |
| Total votes | | 24,680 | 100.00 |
| Democratic hold | | | |

PA House election, 2014: Pennsylvania House, District 36
| Party | Candidate | Votes | % |
|---|---|---|---|
| Democratic | Harry Readshaw (incumbent) | Unopposed | |
| Total votes | | 12,205 | 100.00 |
| Democratic hold | | | |

PA House election, 2012: Pennsylvania House, District 36
| Party | Candidate | Votes | % |
|---|---|---|---|
| Democratic | Harry Readshaw (incumbent) | Unopposed | |
| Total votes | | 21,798 | 100.00 |
| Democratic hold | | | |

PA House election, 2010: Pennsylvania House, District 36
| Party | Candidate | Votes | % |
|---|---|---|---|
| Democratic | Harry Readshaw (incumbent) | Unopposed | |
| Total votes | | 14,115 | 100.00 |
| Democratic hold | | | |
