= San Ysidro McDonald's massacre =

1984 mass shooting in California, U.S.

- Location: 32°33′21.2″N 117°03′15.0″W; San Ysidro, San Diego, California, U.S.
- Date: July 18, 1984; 42 years ago c. 4:00 – 5:17 p.m. (PDT; UTC−07:00)
- Target: Staff and customers at McDonald's
- Attack type: Mass shooting; mass murder; shootout; pedicide; feticide
- Weapons: 9mm Browning HP semi-automatic pistol; 9mm Uzi carbine; 12-gauge Winchester 1200 pump-action shotgun
- Deaths: 22 (including the perpetrator)
- Injuries: 19
- Perpetrator: James Oliver Huberty
- Motive: Inconclusive (possibly rage, suicidal ideation, and/or revenge)

The San Ysidro McDonald's massacre was a mass shooting which occurred at a McDonald's restaurant in the San Ysidro neighborhood of San Diego, California, on July 18, 1984. The perpetrator, 41-year-old James Huberty, fatally shot 21 people, including a pregnant woman, and wounded 19 others before being killed by a police sniper approximately 77 minutes after he had first opened fire.

At the time, the massacre was the deadliest mass shooting by a lone gunman in U.S. history, being surpassed seven years later by the Luby's shooting. It remains the deadliest mass shooting in California history.

== Chain of events ==
=== Prior to incident ===
On July 15, 1984, James Huberty commented to his wife, Etna, that he suspected he had a mental health problem. Two days later, on the morning of July 17, he called a San Diego mental health clinic, requesting an appointment. Leaving his contact details with the receptionist, Huberty was assured the clinic would return his call within hours. According to his wife, Huberty sat quietly beside the telephone for several hours, awaiting the return call, before abruptly walking out of the family home and riding to an unknown destination on his motorcycle. Unbeknownst to Huberty, the receptionist had misspelled his name as "Shouberty". His polite demeanor conveyed no sense of urgency to the operator, and he had elaborated in the phone call that he had never been hospitalized for mental health issues; therefore, the call had been logged as a "non-crisis" inquiry, to be handled within 48 hours. (Note: Shortly after Huberty abruptly walked out of the family apartment, his wife attempted to contact the clinic he had phoned by calling each mental health clinic in the yellow pages with intentions to relay her fears her husband may be homicidal. As the operative at the clinic he had actually contacted had listed his name as "Shouberty", when Etna contacted this clinic, she was informed nobody with her husband's surname had attempted to contact the clinic that day.)

Approximately one hour later, Huberty returned home in a contented mood. After eating dinner, Huberty, his wife, and their two daughters (Zelia, 12, and Cassandra, 10) cycled to a nearby park. Later that evening, he and Etna watched a movie together on their television.

=== July 18, 1984 ===
The following morning—Wednesday, July 18—Huberty, his wife and children visited the San Diego Zoo. In the course of their walk through the zoo, Huberty told his wife of his belief that his life was effectively over. Referring to the mental health clinic's failure to return his phone call the previous day, he said, "Well, society had their chance." After eating lunch at a McDonald's restaurant in the Clairemont neighborhood of San Diego, the Huberty family returned home.

Shortly thereafter, Huberty walked into his bedroom wearing a maroon T-shirt and green camouflage slacks as his wife lay relaxing upon their bed. He leaned toward Etna and said, "I want to kiss you goodbye." Etna kissed her husband, then asked him where he was going, stating her intention to soon prepare the family dinner. Huberty calmly replied he was "going hunting... hunting for humans." (Note: Etna Huberty did not take this statement from her husband seriously, as he had often made remarks of this nature throughout the course of their marriage.)

Holding a gun across his shoulder and carrying a box of ammunition and a bundle wrapped in a checkered blanket, Huberty glanced toward his 12-year-old daughter as he walked toward the front door of their apartment and said "Goodbye. I won't be back." (Note: In October 1984, Zelia would recollect her assumption as her father had walked past her carrying this armoury that he intended to perform target practice in a rural location, as he had often performed this activity to alleviate anger.)

Huberty then drove down San Ysidro Boulevard. According to eyewitnesses, he drove first toward a Big Bear supermarket and then toward a post office, before entering the parking lot of a McDonald's restaurant approximately 200 yards (180 m) from his Averil Road apartment.

== Shooting ==
At approximately 3:56 p.m. on July 18, Huberty drove his black Mercury Marquis sedan into the parking lot of the McDonald's restaurant on San Ysidro Boulevard. In his possession were a 9mm Browning HP semi-automatic pistol, (Note: Some sources describe this pistol as being an automatic firearm.) a 9mm Uzi carbine, a Winchester 1200 12-gauge pump-action shotgun, and a box and a cloth bag filled with hundreds of rounds of ammunition for each weapon. A total of 45 customers were present inside the restaurant.

Entering the restaurant minutes later, Huberty first aimed his shotgun at a 16-year-old employee named John Arnold from a distance of approximately fifteen feet. As he did so, the assistant manager, Guillermo Flores, shouted: "Hey, John, that guy's going to shoot you!" According to Arnold, when Huberty pulled the trigger, "nothing happened." As Huberty inspected his shotgun, which was jammed, the manager of the restaurant, 22-year-old Neva Caine, walked toward the service counter of the restaurant in the direction of Arnold, as Arnold—believing the incident to be a distasteful joke—began to walk away from the gunman. Huberty fired his shotgun toward the ceiling before aiming the Uzi at Caine, shooting her once beneath her left eye. Caine died minutes later.

Immediately after shooting Caine, Huberty fired his shotgun at Arnold, wounding the teenager in the chest and arm, before shouting a comment to the effect of, "Everybody on the ground." Huberty then referred to all present in the restaurant as "dirty swine, Vietnam assholes," before claiming that he had "killed a thousand" and that he intended to "kill a thousand more." Upon hearing Huberty's profane rant and seeing Caine and Arnold shot, one customer, 25-year-old Victor Rivera, tried to persuade Huberty not to shoot anyone else. In response, Huberty fatally shot Rivera fourteen times, repeatedly shouting "shut up" as Rivera screamed in pain.

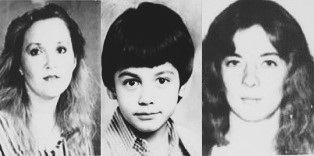
(Left to right): Jackie Lynn Wright Reyes, David Flores Delgado, Blythe Regan Herrera

As staff and customers tried to hide beneath tables and service booths, Huberty turned his attention toward six women and children huddled together. He first killed 19-year-old María Colmenero-Silva with a single gunshot to the chest, then fatally shot nine-year-old Claudia Pérez in the stomach, cheek, thigh, hip, leg, chest, back, armpit, and head with his Uzi. He then wounded Pérez's 15-year-old sister Imelda once in the hand with the same weapon, and fired upon 11-year-old Aurora Peña with his shotgun. Peña—initially wounded in the leg—had been shielded by her pregnant aunt, 18-year-old Jackie Reyes. In a later account of the incident, Peña recollected feeling her aunt's body "bucking and jerking" as Reyes was shot 48 times with the Uzi. Beside his mother's body, eight-month-old Carlos Reyes sat up and wailed, whereupon Huberty shouted at the baby, then killed him with a single pistol shot to the center of the back.

Huberty then shot and killed a 62-year-old trucker named Laurence Versluis, before targeting a family seated near the play area of the restaurant who had tried to shield their son and his friend beneath the tables with their bodies. Thirty-one-year-old Blythe Regan Herrera had shielded her 11-year-old son, Matao, beneath one booth, as her husband, Ronald, protected Matao's friend, 12-year-old Keith Thomas, beneath a booth directly across from them. Ronald Herrera urged Thomas not to move, shielding the boy with his body. Thomas was shot in the shoulder, arm, wrist, and left elbow, but was not seriously wounded; Ronald Herrera was shot six times in the stomach, chest, arm, hip, shoulder, and—via a ricochet—head, but survived his injuries; his wife, Blythe, and son, Matao, were both killed by numerous gunshots to the head.

Casualties

Killed inside restaurant:

- Elsa Herlinda Borboa-Fierro* (19)
- Neva Denise Caine* (22)
- Michelle Deanne Carncross (18)
- María Elena Colmenero-Silva (19)
- Gloria López González (22)
- Blythe Regan Herrera (31)
- Matao Herrera (11)
- Paulina Aquino López* (21)
- Margarita Padilla* (18)
- Claudia Pérez (9)
- Jose Rubén Lozano-Pérez (19)
- Carlos Reyes (8 months)
- Jackie Lynn Wright Reyes (18)
- Victor Maxmillian Rivera (25)
- Arisdelsi Vuelvas-Vargas (31)
- Hugo Luis Velázquez Vasquez (45)
- Laurence Herman Versluis (62)

Killed outside restaurant:

- David Flores Delgado (11)
- Omarr Alonso Hernandez (11)
- Miguel Victoria-Ulloa (74)
- Aída Velázquez Victoria (69)

Injured:

- Juan Acosta (33)
- John Arnold* (16)
- Anthony Atkins (35)
- Astolfo Cejundo (26)
- Joshua Coleman (11)
- Guadalupe del Río (24)
- Astolfo Félix (31)
- Karlita Félix (4 months)
- Maricela Félix (23)
- Ronald Herrera (33)
- Albert Leos* (17)
- Francisco López* (22)
- Aurora Peña (11)
- Imelda Pérez (15)
- Maria Rivera (25)
- Mireya Rivera (4)
- Keith Thomas (12)
- Juan Tokano (33)
- Kenneth Villegas* (22)

Note: * = McDonald's employee

Nearby, three women had also attempted to hide beneath a booth. Twenty-four-year-old Guadalupe del Río lay against a wall; she was shielded by her friends, 25-year-old Gloria Ramírez, and 31-year-old Arisdelsi Vuelvas Vargas. Del Rio was hit several times but was not seriously wounded, Ramírez was unhurt, whereas Vargas received a single gunshot wound to the back of the head. She died of her wound the next day, the only person fatally wounded who lived long enough to reach a hospital. At another booth, Huberty killed 45-year-old banker Hugo Velázquez Vasquez with a single shot to the chest.

The first of many calls to emergency services was made shortly after 4:00 p.m., notifying police of the shooting of a child who had been taken to a post office on San Ysidro Boulevard. The dispatcher mistakenly directed responding officers to another McDonald's two miles (three kilometers) from the San Ysidro Boulevard restaurant. This error delayed the imposition of a lockdown by several minutes, and the only warnings to civilians near the restaurant were given by passers-by. Shortly after 4:00 p.m., a young woman named Lydia Flores drove into the parking lot. Stopping at the food-pickup window, Flores noticed shattered windows and the sound of gunfire, before "looking up and there he was, just shooting." Flores reversed her car until she crashed into a fence; she hid in some bushes with her two-year-old daughter Melissa until the shooting ended.

At approximately 4:05 p.m., a Mexican couple, Astolfo and Maricela Félix, drove toward one of the service areas of the restaurant. Noting the shattered glass, Astolfo initially assumed renovation work was in progress and that Huberty—striding toward the car—was a repairman. Huberty fired his shotgun and Uzi at the couple and their four-month-old daughter, Karlita, striking Maricela in the face, arms and chest, blinding her in one eye and permanently rendering one hand unusable. Karlita was critically wounded in the neck, chest and abdomen. Astolfo was wounded in the chest and head. As Astolfo and Maricela staggered away from Huberty's line of fire, Maricela gave their baby to her husband. Astolfo handed the shrieking child to a young woman named Lucía Velasco as his wife collapsed against a car. Velasco rushed the baby to a nearby hospital as her husband assisted Astolfo and Maricela into a nearby building. All three members of the Félix family survived.

Three 11-year-old boys then rode their BMX bikes into the west parking lot. Hearing a member of the public yell something unintelligible from across the street as they began to dismount their bicycles, all three hesitated, before Huberty shot the three boys with his shotgun and Uzi. Joshua Coleman fell to the ground critically wounded in the back, arm, and leg; he later recalled looking toward his two friends, Omarr Alonso Hernandez and David Flores Delgado, noting that Hernandez was on the ground with multiple gunshot wounds to his back and had started vomiting; Delgado had received several gunshot wounds to his head. Coleman survived; Hernandez and Delgado both died at the scene.

Huberty then noticed an elderly couple, 74-year-old Miguel Victoria Ulloa, and 69-year-old Aída Velázquez Victoria, walking toward the entrance. As Miguel reached to open the door for his wife, Huberty fired his shotgun, killing Aída with a gunshot to the face and wounding Miguel. Two uninjured survivors, Oscar Mondragón and María Sevilla, later reported observing Miguel cradling his wife in his arms and wiping blood from her face, shouting curses at Huberty, who then approached the doorway, swore at Miguel, then killed him with a shot to the head.

=== Police intervention ===
Approximately ten minutes after the first call had been placed to emergency services, police arrived at the correct McDonald's restaurant. The first officer on the scene, Miguel Rosario, rapidly determined the location and cause of the actual disturbance and relayed this information to the San Diego Police Department as Huberty fired at Rosario's patrol car. Officers deployed immediately imposed a lockdown on an area spanning six blocks from the site of the shootings. The police established a command post two blocks from the restaurant and deployed 175 officers in numerous strategic locations. These officers were joined within the hour by several SWAT team members, who also took positions around the restaurant.

As Huberty was firing rapidly and alternating between firearms, police initially were unaware how many individuals were inside the restaurant. Furthermore, because most of the restaurant's windows had been shattered by gunfire, reflections from shards of glass provided an additional difficulty for police focusing inside the restaurant. Initially, police were concerned the gunman or gunmen might be holding hostages, although one individual who had escaped from the restaurant informed police there was a single gunman present in the premises, holding no hostages and shooting any individual he encountered. At 5:05 p.m., all responding law enforcement personnel were authorized to kill the perpetrator(s) should they obtain a clear shot.

Several survivors later reported observing Huberty walk toward the service counter and adjust a portable radio, possibly to search for news reports of his shooting spree, before selecting a music station and further shooting individuals as he danced to the music. Shortly thereafter, Huberty searched the kitchen area, discovering six employees and shouting: "Oh, there's more. You're trying to hide from me, you bastards!" In response, one of the female employees screamed in Spanish, "Don't kill me! Don't kill me!" before Huberty opened fire, killing 21-year-old Paulina López, 19-year-old Elsa Borboa-Fierro, and 18-year-old Margarita Padilla, and critically wounding 17-year-old Albert Leos. Immediately before Huberty had begun shooting, Padilla grabbed the hand of her friend and colleague, 17-year-old Wendy Flanagan, before the two began to run. Padilla was then fatally shot; Flanagan, four other employees, and a female customer and her infant hid inside a basement utility room. They were later joined by Leos, who had crawled to the utility room after being shot five times. (Note: Leos was given impromptu medical attention by the adults within the utility room. He later recalled biting onto a cloth rag to stifle his screams of pain so as not to attract Huberty's attention.)

When a fire truck drove within range, Huberty opened fire and repeatedly pierced the vehicle with bullets, slightly wounding one occupant. Hearing a wounded teenager, 19-year-old Jose Pérez, moaning, Huberty shot him in the head; the youth slumped dead beside the booth he had been seated at. Pérez died alongside his friend and neighbor, 22-year-old Gloria González, and a young woman named Michelle Carncross. At one point, Aurora Peña, who had lain wounded beside her dead aunt, baby cousin and two friends, noted a lull in the firing. Opening her eyes, she saw Huberty nearby, staring in her direction. He swore and threw a bag of french fries at Peña, then retrieved his shotgun and shot the child in the arm, neck, and jaw. Peña survived, although she was hospitalized longer than any other survivor.

I never did see his face. The first time I was actually able to see [Huberty], he was sitting on a counter in about the middle of the building. Then he got up and started walking toward the door, where we had a better view of him from the neck down ... he stopped about six feet from the door, so I took the shot. He dropped the Uzi and was thrown back a few feet.

— SWAT sniper Charles Foster, recollecting his shooting of James Huberty. July 1985.

=== End of incident ===
At 5:17 p.m., Huberty walked from the service counter toward the doorway close to the drive-in window of the restaurant, affording a 27-year-old police SWAT sniper named Charles Foster—deployed to a strategic position on the roof of a post office directly opposite the restaurant—an unobstructed view of his body from the neck down through the telescopic sight of his .308-caliber rifle. Foster fired a single round from a range of approximately 35 yards (32 meters). The bullet entered Huberty's chest, severed his aorta just beneath his heart, and exited through his spine, leaving a one-square-inch (6 cm^{2}) exit wound and sending Huberty sprawling backwards onto the floor directly in front of the service counter, killing him almost instantly. (Note: The fatal bullet fired by Charles Foster was one of only five fired by the police at Huberty throughout the duration of his massacre.)

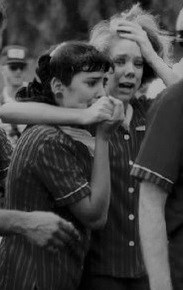
Wendy Flanagan (right) and fellow McDonald's employee Alicia Garcia, pictured in the parking lot of the restaurant shortly after Huberty's death

Immediately after shooting Huberty, Foster relayed to other responding officers he had killed the perpetrator and that his focus remained on the motionless suspect. Nonetheless, as so many rounds had been expended from different firearms within the restaurant, police were not completely certain the sole perpetrator was deceased. Entering the restaurant approximately one minute later, a police sergeant focused his gun upon Huberty as he noted the movements of a wounded girl. When asked if the deceased male was the suspect, the girl nodded her head. Although Huberty was evidently deceased, as a precaution, an officer turned his body face-down and handcuffed his wrists behind his back.

The entire incident had lasted for 77 minutes, during which time Huberty fired a minimum of 257 rounds of ammunition, killing 20 people and wounding as many others, one of whom was pronounced brain dead upon arrival at hospital and died the following day. Seventeen of the victims were killed inside the restaurant and four in the immediate vicinity. Only ten individuals inside the restaurant were uninjured—six of whom had hidden inside the basement utility room.

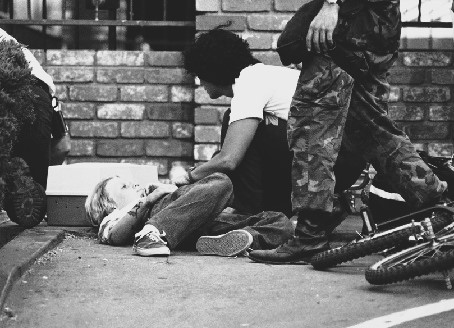
Joshua Coleman receives medical assistance, c. 5:20 p.m.

Several victims had tried to stanch their own wounds and/or the wounds of their companions with napkins—often in vain. Of the fatalities, thirteen died from gunshot wounds to the head, seven from gunshots to the chest, and one victim, eight-month-old Carlos Reyes, from a single 9mm gunshot to the back. The victims, whose ages ranged from four months to 74 years, were predominantly, though not exclusively, of Mexican or Mexican-American ancestry, reflecting local demographics.

Prior to shooting several of his victims, Huberty had shouted accusations or insults. On one occasion, he had also shouted that he himself did not deserve to live, but that he was taking care of this matter. Although Huberty had repeatedly shouted throughout his shooting spree that he had been a veteran of the Vietnam War, he had never actually served in any military branch.

Initial reports issued by the San Diego Police Department following the massacre indicated that everyone injured or killed within the restaurant had been shot by Huberty in the initial minutes after he had first entered the restaurant. This claim was hotly disputed by survivors, who stated Huberty had shot both wounded and unwounded people more than 40 minutes after he had first opened fire.

== Perpetrator ==
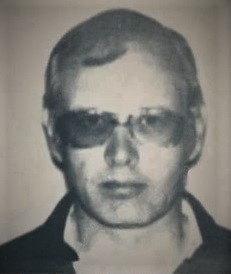
Huberty, c. 1979

James Oliver Huberty (October 11, 1942 – July 18, 1984) was born in Canton, Ohio, the second of two children born to Earl Vincent, a quality inspector, and Icle Evalone Huberty, a homemaker. Both parents were devoutly religious, and the family were regular attendees at local United Methodist Churches.

When Huberty was three years old, he contracted polio. To minimize the debility of this ailment, he was required to wear steel-and-leather braces upon both legs. Although Huberty made a progressive recovery from this ailment, he would be afflicted with a mild limp for the remainder of his life.

In 1950, Earl Huberty purchased a 155-acre (63-hectare) farm in Mount Eaton. Icle refused to live in a rural location, and refused to even view the property. Shortly thereafter, Icle abandoned her family to perform sidewalk preaching as a Pentecostal missionary in Tucson, Arizona. Huberty found his mother's abandonment emotionally devastating; his father would later recollect finding his son slumped against the family chicken coop, sobbing.

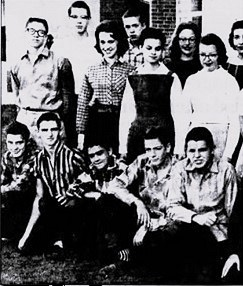
Huberty (upper left), pictured as a Waynedale High School sophomore in 1958

Huberty was a sullen child with few friends, whose primary interest was target practice. A family acquaintance would later describe him as a "queer little boy who practiced incessantly with a target pistol." By his teens, Huberty was something of an amateur gunsmith. (Note: Huberty's father had also been a firearms enthusiast. He had taught his son how to shoot, clean, and maintain weapons from an early age.) Due to his limp, his family's extreme religious beliefs, and his reluctance to socialize with his peers, Huberty was frequently targeted by bullies at Waynedale High School. An average scholar, he graduated 51st out of a class of 77 students in 1960.

In 1962, Huberty enrolled at Malone College, where he initially studied sociology, before opting to study at the Pittsburgh Institute of Mortuary Science. He graduated with honors from this institute in 1964, being issued with a funeral director's license and, the following year, an embalmer's license.

=== Marriage and employment ===
In early 1965, Huberty married Etna Markland, whom he had met while attending Malone College. Shortly after his marriage, Huberty obtained employment at a funeral home in Canton. Although proficient at embalming, Huberty's introverted personality made him ill-suited to dealing with members of the public, causing minor conflicts with his superiors. Nonetheless, Huberty worked in this profession for two years before opting to become a welder for a firm in Louisville. He worked for this firm for two years before securing a better-paid position at Babcock & Wilcox in June 1969. Although reclusive and taciturn, Huberty's employers considered him a reliable worker. He willingly took overtime, earned promotions and by the mid-1970s, regularly earned between $25,000 and $30,000 per year ($150,000 and $179,000, adjusted for inflation). Shortly after Huberty was hired by this firm, he and his wife moved into a three-story home in an affluent section of Massillon, Ohio. In the winter of 1971, this home was destroyed in a fire. Shortly thereafter, James and Etna bought another house on the same street. They later built a six-unit apartment building on the grounds of their first home, which they managed. Daughters Zelia Ellen and Cassandra Catherine were born in February 1972 and February 1974, respectively.

=== Domestic violence and temperament ===
Huberty had a history of domestic violence, frequently slapping or punching his daughters, holding knives to their throats, or beating his wife. On one occasion, Etna filed a report with the Canton Department of Children and Family Services stating that her husband had "messed up" her jaw, although she later insisted on the majority of occasions he had assaulted her, he struck her only once. Beginning in 1976, Etna repeatedly attempted to persuade her husband to seek counseling to alleviate his sources of stress, although he refused to seek any form of therapy. In personal efforts to pacify her husband's temper, anxiety, and general paranoia and to both influence and control his behavior, Etna took great efforts to minimize any possibility of agitating her husband. She also gradually developed a mechanism whereby she claimed to be able to read his future by reading playing or tarot cards. Huberty believed her. Etna's readings would produce a temporary calming effect, and Huberty would typically follow the recommendations his wife made in these readings.

To his neighbors and co-workers, Huberty was perceived as a sullen, ill-tempered and somewhat paranoid individual, obsessed with firearms and who harbored a mental tally of every setback, insult, or general source of frustration—real or perceived—against himself or his family within his mind. Occasionally, Huberty would retaliate in response to any real or perceived injustice in an effort to settle what he termed "my debts", and conflicts with his neighbors would once lead to his detainment on charges of disorderly conduct. On one occasion, he is known to have informed the father of two girls whom he had encouraged his daughters to fight in response to a conflict between the children: "I believe in paying my debts. Both good and bad."

A conspiracy theorist and self-proclaimed survivalist, Huberty believed an escalation of the Cold War was inevitable and that president Jimmy Carter and, later, Ronald Reagan and the United States government were conspiring against him. Convinced of an imminent increase in Soviet aggression, Huberty believed that a breakdown of society was fast approaching, perhaps through economic collapse or nuclear war. He committed himself to prepare to survive this perceived collapse and provisioned his house with ample reserve supplies of non-perishable food and numerous guns—some purchased from co-workers—that he intended to use to defend his home during what he believed was the coming apocalypse. According to one family acquaintance named Jim Aslanes, Huberty's home was bedecked with loaded firearms to such a degree that wherever Huberty was sitting or standing within his home, he "could just reach over and get a gun." Each firearm was loaded, with the safety catch disabled.

=== Unemployment and relocation to Tijuana ===
In November 1982, Huberty was laid off from his welding job at Babcock & Wilcox, causing him to become despondent over his dire financial situation and general inability to provide for his family. (Note: Huberty perceived the closure of Babcock & Wilcox as evidence of government mistreatment against working people.) One co-worker would later recollect that, upon being notified of the impending closure of this engineering firm, Huberty had made a comment indicating that if he was unable to provide for his family, he intended to commit suicide and "take everyone with him." According to Etna, shortly after her husband became unemployed, Huberty began hearing voices. In early 1983, he placed a loaded pistol against his temple, threatening to commit suicide. Etna successfully dissuaded her husband from shooting himself, although he later remarked to her: "You should have let me shoot myself." (Note: Within a year of this incident, Etna would remark to both police and the media her regrets in not letting her husband commit suicide on this occasion.)

Unable to find lasting employment in Ohio, James and Etna Huberty sold their six-unit apartment building for $115,000 in the spring of 1983. Shortly thereafter, Huberty obtained alternate welding employment with Union Metal Manufacturing Company. This employment lasted five weeks before the closure of the plant. Weeks after he became unemployed, Huberty and one of his daughters were injured in a traffic accident. In the weeks following this accident, Huberty noted an aggravation in neck pains he had endured since childhood. He also noted an occasional, increasing nerve tremor in his hands and arms.

In the summer of 1983, the Hubertys applied for residency in Mexico, believing the money obtained from the sale of their apartment building would financially sustain the family longer in Mexico than in America. Having also sold their home for just $12,000 in cash in September (with the buyer assuming their $48,000 mortgage), Huberty informed family acquaintances of his intentions to relocate his family to Tijuana in search of employment opportunities, confidently stating, "We're going to show them who's boss."

When Huberty and his family moved from Ohio to Tijuana, in October 1983, he left all but the most essential of his family's possessions in storage in Ohio, but ensured he brought his huge collection of guns, ammunition and survival supplies with him. According to published reports, Huberty's wife and daughters embraced their new environs and became friendly with their neighbors, although Huberty—who spoke little Spanish—was sullen and taciturn. Unable to find employment in Tijuana, Huberty quickly regretted his decision to relocate to Mexico. Within three months, the family relocated to San Ysidro: a largely poor district of San Diego just north of the Mexico–United States border which in 1984 had a population of 13,000.

=== San Ysidro ===
In San Ysidro, the Hubertys rented a two-bedroom apartment within the Cottonwood Apartments as Huberty sought employment. The fact his family were the only Anglo-Americans within this apartment complex irritated Huberty, who was notably rude to his neighbors. Shortly thereafter, Huberty applied to a newspaper advertisement offering security guard training in a federally funded program. He completed this course on April 12 and soon obtained employment with a security firm in Chula Vista, assigned with guarding a condominium complex. The money earned enabled the family to have their furniture shipped from Ohio, and the family relocated to a two-bedroom apartment on Averil Road the same month. The monthly rent for this apartment was $450.

On July 10, Huberty was summarily dismissed from this job; his employers informed Huberty the reasons for his dismissal were his poor work performance and a noted general physical instability.

== Aftermath ==
The day after the massacre, reporters visited James Huberty's father in Mount Eaton, Ohio, to garner further information about his son. Having discussed his son's childhood and the family's religious background, Earl Huberty pointed to a painting of a lost sheep by the Jordan River before beginning to weep, informing reporters: "Yesterday was the worst day of my life. I feel so sorry for those people."

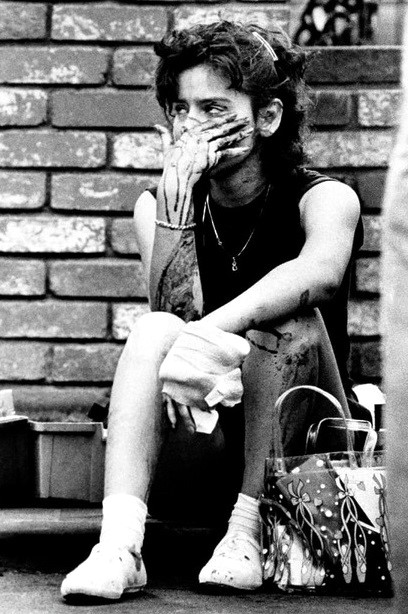
A wounded survivor, pictured on the grounds of the restaurant shortly after the incident

McDonald's temporarily suspended all television and radio advertisements in the days following the massacre. In an act of solidarity, arch-rival fast food chain Burger King also temporarily suspended all forms of advertising.

Huberty's body was cremated on July 23, 1984. No official religious service was observed throughout this act. His ashes were returned to his widow, and later interred in his home state of Ohio.

In the weeks following the massacre, Huberty's wife and daughters received numerous death threats, forcing them to temporarily reside with a family friend. All three would attend counseling sessions for more than nine months. Etna Huberty and her daughters initially relocated from San Ysidro to Chula Vista, where Zelia and Cassandra enrolled in school under assumed names. One year later, the family moved to the community of Spring Valley in San Diego County.

Because of the sheer number of victims, local funeral homes had to use the San Ysidro Civic Center to hold wakes for each victim. The local parish, Mount Carmel Church, was forced to hold back-to-back funeral masses in order that each of the dead could be buried in a timely manner.

Several police officers who responded to the scene of the massacre suffered symptoms including sleep withdrawal, loss of memory and guilt in the months following the incident. A study commissioned by the National Institute of Mental Health and conducted by the chief psychologist of the San Diego Police Department in 1985 concluded several officers suffered post-traumatic stress disorder as a result of the incident.

The massacre prompted the city of San Diego to assess the tactical methods by which they responded to incidents of this nature and the firearms in the possession of responding officers. The police department increased training for special units and purchased more powerful firearms in order to better equip law enforcement to respond to scenarios of this magnitude. According to one officer, who confessed to having felt "inadequate" because he had been equipped with a .38-caliber revolver on the day of the massacre: "The time had come where you had to have a full-time, committed and dedicated, highly trained, well-equipped team [...] able to respond rapidly, anywhere in the city."

On August 2, San Diego Police Chief William Kolendar held a press conference to disclose the results of the San Diego Police Department's inquiry into their response to the massacre, and the fact an estimated 73 minutes had elapsed between the time the first police officer had arrived at the restaurant and Huberty's death. The results of this internal inquiry found that although the arrival of SWAT team members was delayed by rush-hour traffic, the police acted appropriately in their method of response. Kolendar stated any suggestion police should have stormed the restaurant was "ludicrous", adding that officers had been unable to obtain a clear view of the gunman because windows had been "spider-webbed" by bullet holes, making visibility in direct sunlight difficult. He also emphasized the eight-minute delay between the passing of the instruction authorizing all law enforcement personnel to kill Huberty and his death made no difference to the final death toll. Kolendar finished his report by stating: "I believe the operation was handled the way it should have been handled." When questioned in regards to the actual motive behind Huberty's murder spree, Kolendar dismissed any notion of a racial motive behind the massacre, informing reporters: "He didn't like anybody." (Note: The day after the San Ysidro McDonald's massacre, Etna Huberty speculated to reporters her husband's motive for the shootings had been an attempt to "get back at society ... he was trying to make [society] hurt the way he was hurting.")

Within two days of the massacre, the restaurant had been refurbished and renovated. The restaurant planned to again open for business in the hope that—as one employee commented—the building would become "just another McDonald's." Following discussions between community leaders and McDonald's executives, a decision was reached on July 24 that the restaurant would not reopen. The renovated restaurant was demolished at midnight on September 26. Following the closure and demolition of the restaurant, McDonald's donated the ground to the city, with the stipulation that no restaurant be constructed upon the site. For more than four years, plans to convert the site into either a memorial park or a shrine to the dead were considered. The land was sold in February 1988 to Southwestern College for $136,000, with the agreement that a 300-square-foot (28 m^{2}) area in front of the campus extension the college intended to construct be set aside as a permanent memorial to the 21 victims. McDonald's later constructed another restaurant two blocks from the site of the massacre upon West San Ysidro Boulevard. The restaurant chain also announced a commitment to donate $1 million to a survivors' fund, with Joan Kroc, the widow of McDonald's founder Ray Kroc, also adding a personal contribution of $100,000 to assist with burial costs, financial aid for relatives of the deceased, and counseling for survivors. The sum total of donations received by this fund exceeded $1.4 million. Amidst impromptu protests from some San Ysidro residents and donors, Etna Huberty received the first pay-out from this fund. (Note: The San Ysidro Family Survivors fund defended their decision to provide a donation to the Etna Huberty and her children, stating author and donor Norman Cousins had stipulated a percentage of his donation be given to Huberty's wife and daughters as they too were victims of the tragedy.)

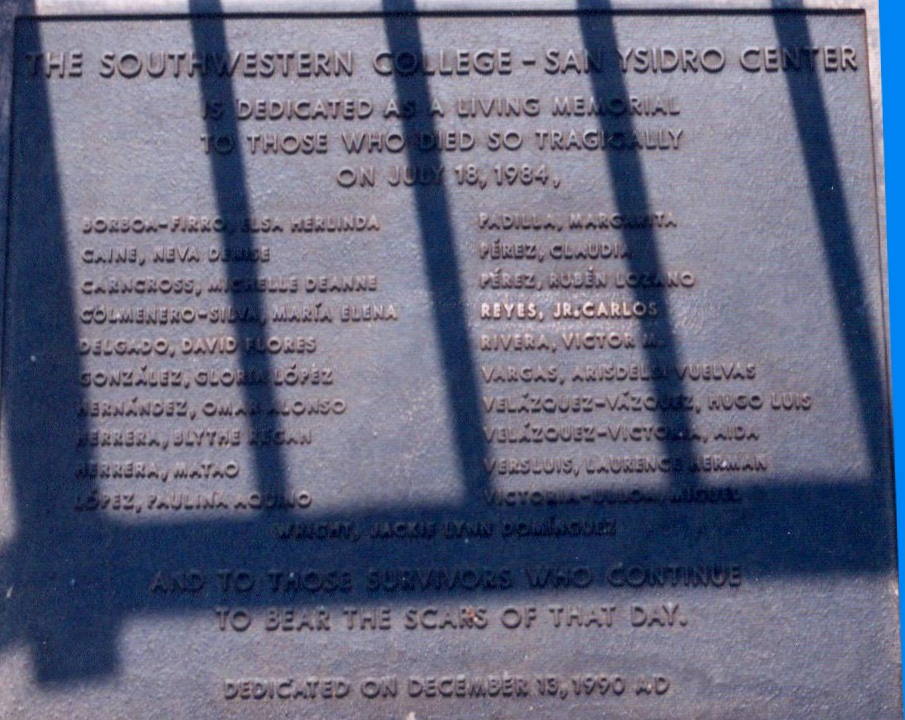
Plaque at the victims' memorial, inscribed with the names of the 21 dead

A permanent memorial to those killed in the massacre was formally unveiled in 1990. This memorial consists of 21 hexagonal white marble pillars 1–6 feet (0.30–1.83 m), each bearing the name of a victim. The sculpture was designed by a former Southwestern College student named Roberto Valdes, who said of his inspiration for the design: "The 21 hexagons represent each person that died, and they are different heights, representing the variety of ages and races of the people involved in the massacre. They are bonded together in the hopes that the community, in a tragedy like this, will stick together, like they did." The monument is located at 460 West San Ysidro Boulevard. Each anniversary of the San Ysidro McDonald's massacre sees this monument decorated with flowers. On the three days people of Mexican heritage observe the Day of the Dead, candles and offerings are brought on behalf of the victims.

Several family members of those killed, along with survivors of the massacre, filed lawsuits against McDonald's and the San Diego Police Department. These suits were heard in the San Diego County Superior Court. All lawsuits were consolidated and later dismissed before trial on a defense motion for summary judgment. The plaintiffs appealed this ruling. On July 25, 1987, the California Court of Appeal affirmed summary judgment for the defendants, ruling McDonald's or any other business has no duty of care to protect patrons from an unforeseeable assault by a murderous madman, and the implemented security measures typically used by restaurants to deter criminals, such as guards and closed-circuit television cameras, could not possibly have deterred the perpetrator, as he did not care about his own survival. Furthermore, the San Diego Police Department were also exonerated of any culpability or negligence, with the appellate panel ruling: "In view of the sheer horror of the ordeal, it is difficult to imagine anything the police could have done or failed to do which would have made the risk any greater than that to which (the victims) were exposed before the police arrived." The final lawsuits were dismissed in August 1991.

In July 1986, Etna Huberty filed a lawsuit against both McDonald's and her husband's longtime former employer, Babcock & Wilcox. This civil suit—seeking $5 million in damages—asserted her husband's murder spree had been triggered by a combination of a poor diet and her husband working around highly poisonous metals without adequate protection over the course of many years. (Note: James and Etna Huberty had regularly eaten McDonald's fast food throughout the course of their marriage.) The suit specifically cited that no traces of either drugs or alcohol had been discovered in Huberty's body at his autopsy—negating any possibility of his actions being influenced by either factor—and that the alleged accrual of the high levels of lead and cadmium discovered in Huberty's body at his autopsy had most likely accumulated via an ongoing exposure to the fumes inhaled during the 13 years he had been employed as a welder (without sufficient respiratory protection) by Babcock & Wilcox, and that a combination of Huberty's exposure to these chemicals with his ingesting high levels of monosodium glutamate in the staple McDonald's food he had regularly consumed had induced delusions and an uncontrollable rage. This lawsuit was dismissed in 1987. Etna Huberty died of breast cancer in 2003.

Survivor Albert Leos later became a police officer. He served in several police departments in the South Bay region of San Diego County. Leos later joined the San Diego Police Department.

== Media ==
=== Film ===
- The 1988 film Bloody Wednesday is loosely inspired by the massacre. Directed by Mark Gilhuis, the film casts Raymond Elmendorf as the protagonist.

=== Literature ===
- Cawthorne, Nigel; Tibballs, Geoff (1993). Killers. London: Boxtree. pp. 316-322. ISBN 0-7522-0850-0.
- Foreman, Laura (1992). Mass Murderers: True Crime. New York: Time-Life Books. pp. 112-139. ISBN 0-7835-0004-1.
- Franscell, Ron (2011). Delivered from Evil: True Stories of Ordinary People Who Faced Monstrous Mass Killers and Survived. Massacheusetts: Fair Winds Press. ISBN 978-1-592-33440-7.

=== Television ===
- The 2016 documentary film 77 Minutes: The 1984 San Diego McDonald's Massacre focuses upon the murders committed by James Huberty. Directed by Charlie Minn, this documentary features interviews with many individuals present in the restaurant at the time of the murders and the SWAT sniper who ended the massacre.

== See also ==
- Gun violence in the United States
- List of homicides in California
- List of massacres in California
- List of murdered American children
- List of rampage killers in the United States
- List of attacks committed at McDonald's restaurants
- Mass murder – Act of murdering many people in a short span
- Mass shootings in the United States – Incidents involving multiple victims of firearm violence
- Spree shooting – Person killing in multiple locations in a short time
- Suicidal ideation – Thoughts, ideas, or ruminations about attempting suicide
