= Frank O'Brien (politician) =

American politician

Member of the Pennsylvania House of Representatives from the 22nd district
- In office 1969–1970
- Preceded by: District created
- Succeeded by: William J. Coyne

Personal details
- Born: January 25, 1918 Pittsburgh, Pennsylvania
- Died: May 18, 2006 (aged 88) Westlake, Ohio
- Party: Democratic

Frank W. O'Brien (January 25, 1918 – May 18, 2006) was a Democratic member of the Pennsylvania House of Representatives. He was the son of James and Ella (née Cawley) O'Brien.
