= Chris Schmotzer =

German physician

Chris Schmotzer is a German physician who is known for her work with leprosy patients in Pakistan. She is the medical director of the Rawalpindi Leprosy Hospital.

== Biography ==
Chris Schmotzer was born in Germany.

Schmotzer moved to Pakistan in 1988, following a brief stint in Ethiopia where she trained in treating leprosy patients. She was inspired to work in regions lacking the healthcare facilities prevalent in the developing countries, joining a team of German medical volunteers in Pakistan. She assumed the role of medical director at the Rawalpindi Leprosy Hospital after completing her postgraduate medical education.

Schmotzer is a member of the German Protestant Sisterhood of Christ-Bearers.

In 2020, Schmotzer was honored with the Order of Merit of the Federal Republic of Germany.
