= Frank O'Brien (rugby union) =

Rugby player (1910–1984)

- Full name: Frank William Hall O'Brien
- Born: 19 July 1910 Lindfield, Sydney, Australia
- Died: 23 December 1984 (aged 74)

Rugby union career
- Position: Wing
International career
Years	Team	Apps	(Points)
1937–38	Australia	2	(3)

Frank William Hall O'Brien (19 July 1910 — 23 December 1984) was an Australian rugby union international.

Born in Sydney, O'Brien was gifted in several sports in his youth. While attending North Sydney Boys High School, he had three years in the 1st XV rugby and 1st XI cricket teams, before transferring to Sydney Grammar School for his final year.

O'Brien was a five-time New South Wales state pentathlon champion and in 1932 won a national title for the 440 yard sprint, beating 1930 British Empire Games bronze medallist George Golding.

A winger, O'Brien won a first-grade rugby premiership with Northern Suburbs in 1935 and the following year joined Gordon for the club's debut Shute Shield season. After scoring two tries for New South Wales against the touring Springboks in 1937, he earned a Wallabies call up for the 2nd Test and scored a try on debut, becoming Gordon's first international representative. He was capped a second time in a Test against the All Blacks at the Sydney Cricket Ground in 1938.

== See also ==
- List of Australia national rugby union players
