= Harry Readshaw =

American politician

Harry A. Readshaw III

Member of the Pennsylvania House of Representatives from the 36th district
- In office January 3, 1995 – November 30, 2020
- Preceded by: Christopher K. McNally
- Succeeded by: Jessica Benham

Personal details
- Born: August 7, 1941 (age 85) Pittsburgh, Pennsylvania
- Party: Democratic
- Spouse: Carol
- Education: Pittsburgh Institute of Mortuary Science
- Website: www.pahouse.com/readshaw/

Harry A. Readshaw III (born August 17, 1941) is a retired American politician. He was a Democratic member of the Pennsylvania House of Representatives for the 36th District from 1994 until 2020.

== Education and career ==
Readshaw graduated from Carrick High School in 1959 and attended Duquesne University from 1959 to 1962. He graduated from the Pittsburgh Institute of Mortuary Science in 1962.

Prior to elective office, he served in the United States Marine Corps Reserve and in the Carrick Community Council. He has been a funeral director since 1970.

== Personal life ==
Readshaw and his wife live in Pittsburgh, Pennsylvania, and have three children.
