= Martin Schmotzer =

American politician

Member of the Pennsylvania House of Representatives from the 22 district
- In office May 2012 – January 2013
- Preceded by: Chelsa Wagner
- Succeeded by: Erin Molchany

Personal details
- Party: Democratic
- Spouse: Amy

Martin L. Schmotzer is an entrepreneur and United States politician. He is a former member of the Pennsylvania House of Representatives for the 22nd District and is a member of the United States Democratic Party.

Schmotzer grew up in Dormont, a borough in Pittsburgh, Pennsylvania. He received a bachelor's degree in English from St. Fidelis College Seminary in Butler, Pennsylvania. After studying, he married his high-school sweetheart and chose to raise a family in Pittsburgh, close to his family and friends. .

He is a former Teamsters Laborer and now runs BABS Associates, a consulting firm that designs political flyers and mailings. Schmotzer served as deputy clerk of courts for Allegheny County. In 1997, while holding this position, he was fired in April 1997 for stealing $50,000 from the Allegheny County Clerk of Courts office. He pleaded guilty and returned the money, though the charges where eventually dropped due to a legal technicality.

He moved on to work for a window company and eventually started his own handy-man service called AAA One Call Handyman.

In addition to running a business, Schmotzer served on his local school board. He began serving the Baldwin-Whitehall School Board in 1987 and left his position when his first daughter was born in 1993. In 2007 he ran and was elected to the school board and remained on it until 2011. He decided to run for Pennsylvania State Representative for the 22nd District in a special election to fill the remainder of Chelsa Wagner's term. Wagner had been elected to the position of Allegheny County Controller. Schmotzer served as State Representative until 2012 and then returned to his position in local politics.

Martin become the center of controversy on the Baldwin-Whitehall School board when he resigned and within minutes was appointed to a newly created job for $120,000. After public outcry, petition and ethics complaints he resigned two weeks later. He was later fined by PA State Ethics Commission.

"A Baldwin-Whitehall school director orchestrated his appointment to a $120,000-a-year administrative job in the district, violating ethics laws and lobbying other board members to support creating the position, said a 32 page report issued Friday by the state Ethics Commission."
