= Pittsburgh Institute of Mortuary Science =

American professional school

Pennsylvania Institute of Mortuary Science
- Motto: "Scientia, Sollertia, Servitium"
- Type: Private, not-for-profit
- Undergraduates: 209
- Location: Pittsburgh, Pennsylvania, United States
- Website: pims.edu

Pittsburgh Institute of Mortuary Science is a funeral service program based in the Shadyside neighborhood of Pittsburgh, Pennsylvania, United States.

== Notable alumni ==
- James Huberty – Perpetrator of the San Ysidro McDonald's massacre.
- John J. Hafer – Maryland state senator
