= John H. Devlin =

American politician

Democratic Leader of the Pennsylvania Senate
- In office January 1, 1963 – July 20, 1967
- Preceded by: Charles Weiner
- Succeeded by: Ernest Kline

Member of the Pennsylvania Senate from the 43rd district
- In office January 3, 1961 – July 20, 1967
- Preceded by: Joseph Barr
- Succeeded by: Frank Mazzei

Member of the Pennsylvania House of Representatives from the Allegheny County district
- In office January 1, 1957 – November 30, 1960

Personal details
- Born: May 27, 1891
- Died: July 20, 1967 (aged 76)
- Party: Democratic

John H. Devlin (May 27, 1891 – July 20, 1967) is a former Democratic member of the Pennsylvania State Senate who served from 1961 until his death in 1967. He also served in the Pennsylvania House of Representatives.

Before serving in the Pennsylvania House of Representatives, Devlin served as a special agent of the FBI (1940–1947), was a real estate deputy for the Allegheny County Sheriff (1947–1951), had a legal practice in 1951, and was Assistant D.A. of Allegheny County (1956–1964).
