= Christopher McNally =

American politician

Christopher K. McNally

Member of the Pennsylvania House of Representatives from the 36th district
- In office 1989–1994
- Preceded by: Michael Dawida
- Succeeded by: Harry Readshaw

Personal details
- Born: August 25, 1960 (age 65) Pittsburgh, Pennsylvania, United States
- Party: Democratic

Christopher K. McNally (born August 25, 1960) is a former Democratic member of the Pennsylvania House of Representatives.
