= List of people from Memphis, Tennessee =

This is a list of notable people who were born in, residents of, or otherwise closely associated with Memphis, Tennessee.

This list is in alphabetical order by last name.

== A ==
- Johnny Ace (1929–1954) — rhythm and blues singer
- Mo Alexander (born 1970) — comedian
- Heather Armstrong (1975–2023) — author and blogger, Dooce.com
- Kristin Armstrong (born 1973) — professional road bicycle racer and three-time Olympic gold medalist
- George Awsumb (1880–1959) — Norwegian-American architect
- Gwen Robinson Awsumb (1915–2003) — first woman elected to Memphis City Council
- Estelle Axton (1918–2004) — co-founder of Stax Records

== B ==
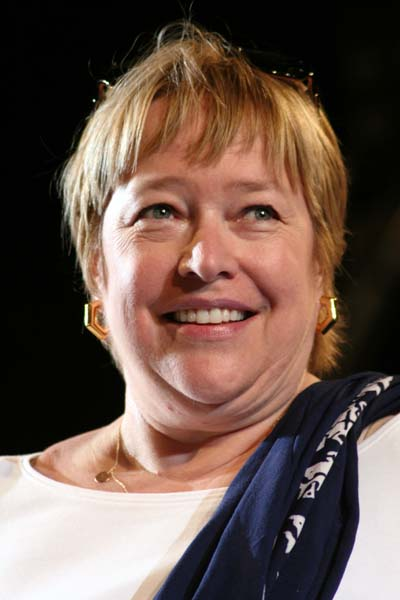
Kathy Bates

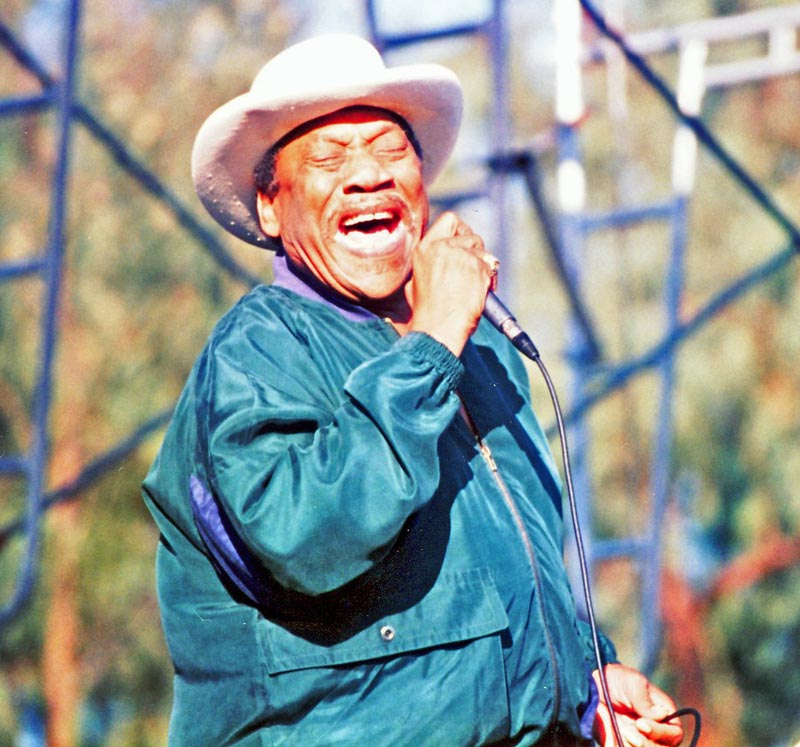
Bobby "Blue" Bland

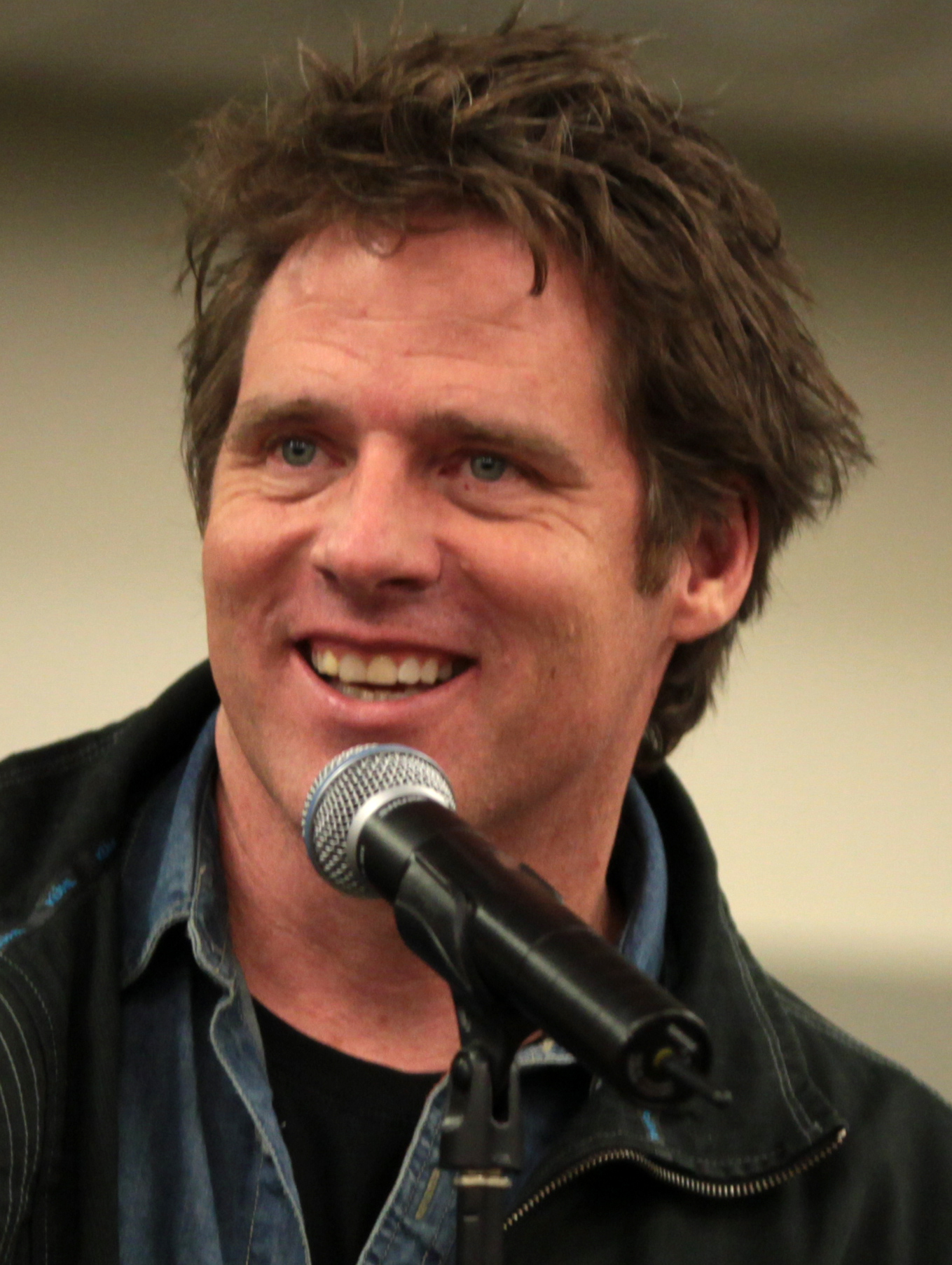
Ben Browder

- Julien Baker (born 1995) — singer, songwriter, and guitarist
- Michael A. Baker (born 1953) — astronaut
- Adrian Banks (born 1986) — American-Israeli basketball player
- The Bar-Kays (formed in 1966) — musicians
- Lloyd Barbee (1925–2002) — Wisconsin legislator and civil rights activist
- Charles Barr (1903–1926) — serial killer known as “The Petting Party Bandit”
- Marion Barry (1936–2014) — mayor of Washington, D.C.
- Charles Bartliff (1886–1962) — soccer player and 1904 Olympian
- Daren Bates (born 1990) — NFL player
- Kathy Bates (born 1948) — actress
- Kenneth Lawrence Beaudoin (1913–1995) — poet
- Michael Beck (born 1949) — actor, best known for The Warriors and Xanadu
- Reginald Becton (born 1991) — basketball player who currently plays for Yokohama B-Corsairs of the B. League
- William Bedford (born 1963) — basketball player
- Diane Meredith Belcher (born 1960) — concert organist, teacher, and church musician
- Chris Bell (1951–1978) — musician
- William Bell (born 1939) — singer
- Charles T. Bernard (1927–2015) — businessman and Arkansas politician, died in Memphis in 2015
- Big Scarr (2000–2022) — rapper
- Big Star (formed in 1971) — rock band
- Big30 — rapper
- Greg Bird — Major League Baseball first baseman
- Blac Youngsta (born 1990) — rapper; born Samuel Marquez Benson
- Tarik Black (born 1991) — basketball player
- James Blackwood (1919–2002) — gospel singer, founding member of quartet the Blackwood Brothers
- Bobby "Blue" Bland (1930–2013) — musician
- BlocBoy JB — rapper
- Elizabeth Bolden (1890–2006) — oldest person in the world during most of 2006
- Charles Boyce (born 1949) — syndicated cartoonist, author, illustrator
- Mary Forrest Bradley (1869–1965) — historian
- Cory Branan (born 1974) — singer/songwriter
- Craig Brewer (born 1971) — film director
- Ben Browder (born 1962) — actor, best known for Farscape and Stargate SG-1
- Dave Brown (born 1946) — TV meteorologist, professional wrestling announcer
- Joe Brown (born 1947) — politician
- Isaac Bruce (born 1972) — former NFL player
- Kimberly Bryant (born 1967) — engineer and founder of Black Girls Code
- Antonio Burks (born 1980) — former basketball player
- Dorsey Burnette (1932–1979) — rockabilly pioneer, singer-songwriter
- Johnny Burnette (1934–1964) — rockabilly pioneer, singer-songwriter
- Leonard Burton (born 1964) — NFL player
- Mike Butler (1946–2018) — basketball player
- Derrick Byars (born 1984) — basketball player
- Latasha Byears (born 1973) — basketball player

== C ==
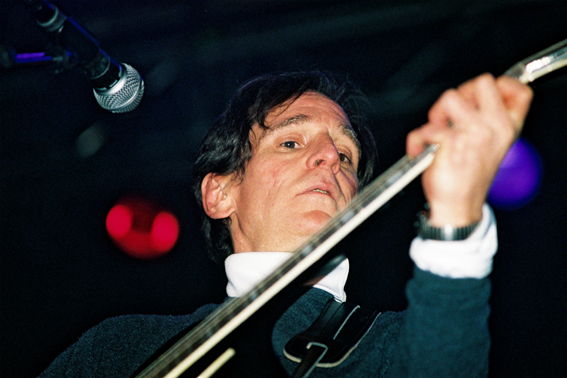
Alex Chilton

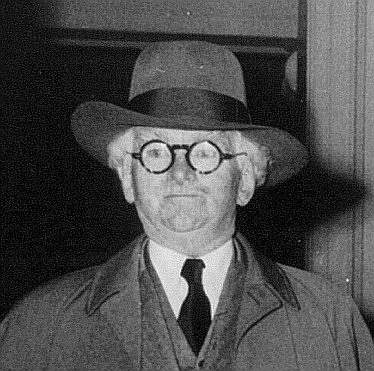
Edward H. Crump

- Thomas Cease (1942–2026) – electrical engineer
- Herman Cain (1945–2020) — businessman, talk show host, and candidate for the 2012 Republican presidential nomination
- Tyrone Calico (born 1980) — NFL player for the Tennessee Titans
- Dixie Carter (1939–2010) — actress known for Designing Women and Desperate Housewives
- Lorenzo Carter (born 1995) — linebacker for the Atlanta Falcons
- Bob Caruthers (1864–1911) — Major League Baseball player
- Kellye Cash (born 1965) — Miss America 1987
- Rosanne Cash (born 1955) — singer-songwriter
- Cy Casper (1912–1968) — NFL player for the Green Bay Packers, St. Louis Gunners, and Pittsburgh Pirates
- Dave Catching (born 1961) — musician
- Alex Chilton (1950–2010) — musician
- NLE Choppa — rapper
- Robert Reed Church Sr. (1839–1912) — entrepreneur and philanthropist
- Mary Church Terrell — civil and women's rights activist
- Ian Clark (born 1991) — basketball player
- Philip Claypool — musician
- Jack Clement — singer-songwriter, and record and film producer
- Antonius Cleveland (born 1994) — basketball player in the Israeli Basketball Premier League
- Lashundra Trenyce Cobbin (born 1980) — American Idol contestant
- Steve Cohen (born 1949) — U.S. representative for Tennessee
- Olivia Cole (1942–2018) — actress
- George Coleman (born 1935) — musician
- Barron Collier (1873–1939) — businessman
- Jazzie Collins (1958–2013) — African American trans woman activist and community organizer
- John Cooper (born 1975) — musician, Skillet
- Zack Cozart — baseball shortstop and third baseman for the Cincinnati Reds and Los Angeles Angels
- Hank Crawford (1934–2009) — musician
- Steve Cropper (born 1941) — musician, Booker T. and the M.G.'s and The Blues Brothers
- Edward H. Crump (1874–1954) — political boss and U.S. Representative
- Randy Culpepper (born 1989) — basketball player

== D ==
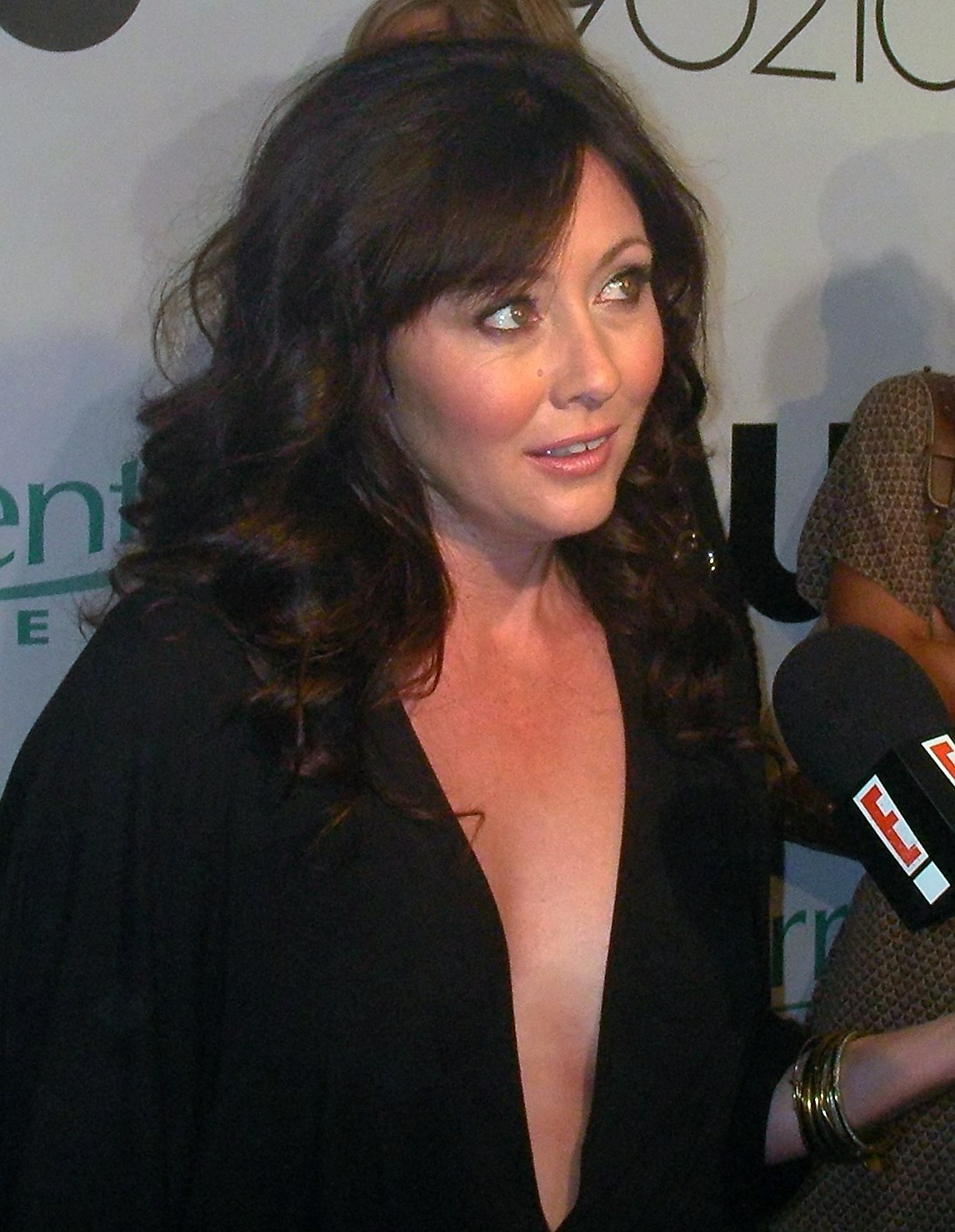
Shannen Doherty

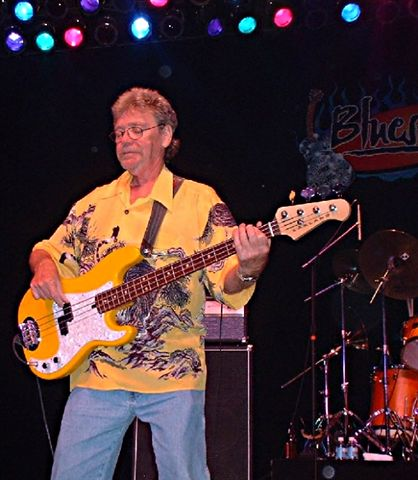
Donald "Duck" Dunn

- Chastity Daniels (born 1978) — musician
- Janette Davis (1916–2005) — singer
- Rick Dees (born 1950) — radio personality
- Nancy Denson — mayor of Athens, Georgia
- Duke Deuce (born 1992) — rapper
- Eric Jerome Dickey (1961–2021) — author
- Jim Dickinson (1941–2009) — musician; producer
- Peter C. Doherty (born 1940) — scientist at St. Jude Children's Research Hospital
- Shannen Doherty (1971–2024) — actress known for Beverly Hills, 90210
- Young Dolph (1985–2021) — rapper (grew up in Memphis)
- Johnny Dowd (born 1948) — musician
- Drumma Boy (born 1983) — hip hop music producer
- William B. Dunavant (1932–2021) — businessman, CEO of Dunavant Enterprises
- Donald "Duck" Dunn (1941–2012) — musician

== E ==
- Johanna Edwards (born 1978) — author
- William Eggleston (born 1939) — photographer
- Egypt Central (2002–2014) — band
- Eightball & MJG (established in 1991) — musicians
- Clara Ester (1948–2026) – civil rights activist

== F ==
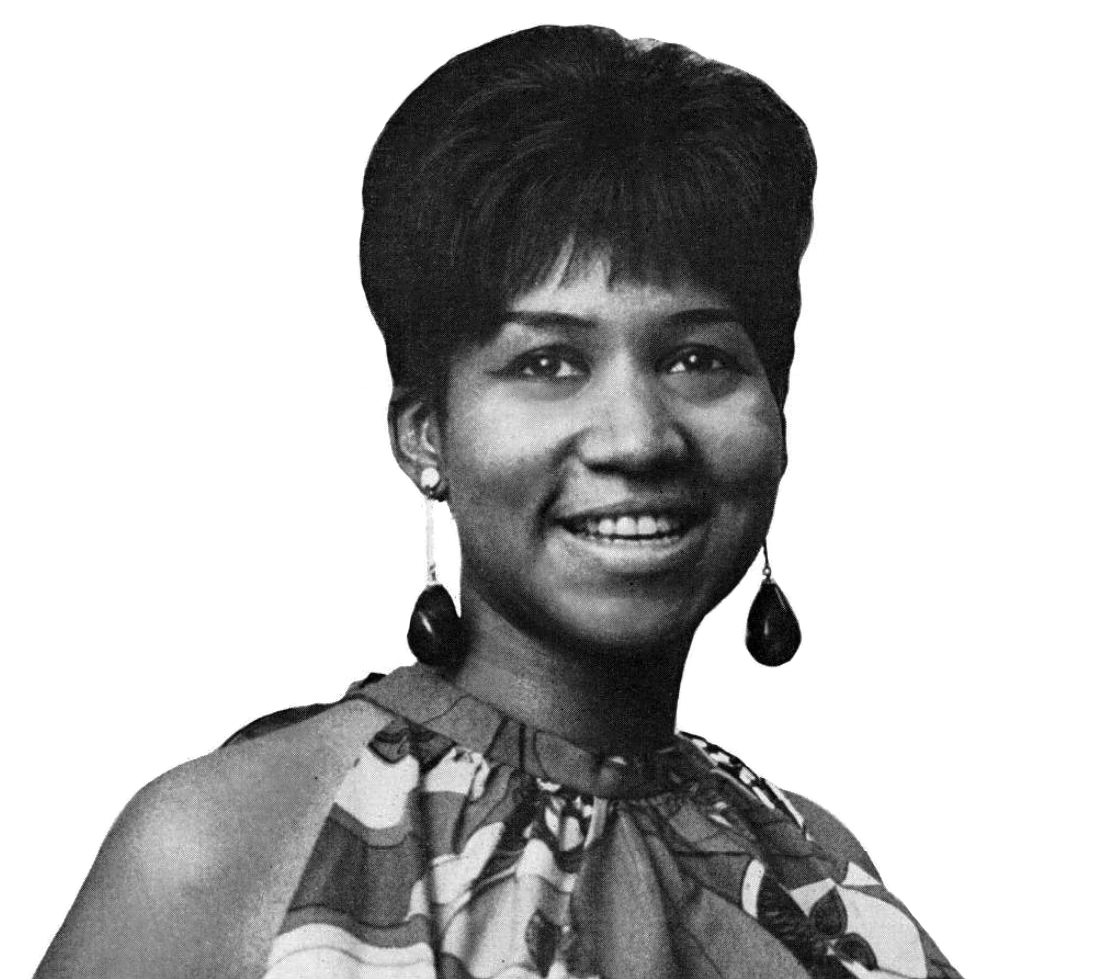
Aretha Franklin

- Charlie Feathers — rockabilly musician, died here in 1998
- Ben Ferguson — nationally syndicated talk radio host
- Paul Finebaum — television and radio sports-talk host
- Finesse2tymes — rapper
- Marjorie Finlay — opera singer and television personality
- Veronica Finn — pop singer of now-disbanded group Innosense
- Ric Flair — professional wrestler (adopted at six weeks; raised in Minnesota)
- Rey Flemings — music commissioner
- Avron Fogelman — former owner of Kansas City Royals and various Memphis-based sports teams; namesake of southeastern leg of Interstate 240
- Shelby Foote — author
- George L. Forbes — Cleveland City Council President, President of the Cleveland NAACP
- Clementine Ford — actress
- Harold Ford Jr. — politician
- Jacob Ford — NFL player, Tennessee Titans
- Abe Fortas — politician and U.S. Supreme Court justice
- Cary Fowler — agriculturalist, established the Svalbard Global Seed Vault
- Morgan Jon Fox — film director
- Aretha Franklin (1942–2018) — singer
- Frayser Boy — Academy Award-winning rapper
- Nelson Frazier Jr. — wrestler
- Morgan Freeman — actor
- Judy Freudberg — writer
- John Fry — music producer, engineer, founder of Ardent Studios

== G ==
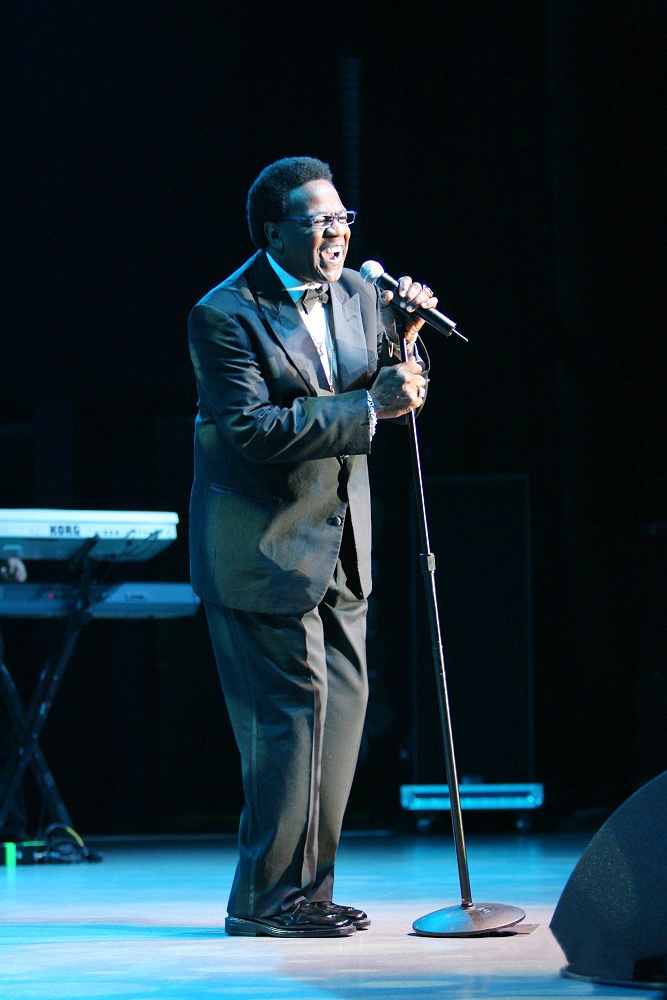
Al Green

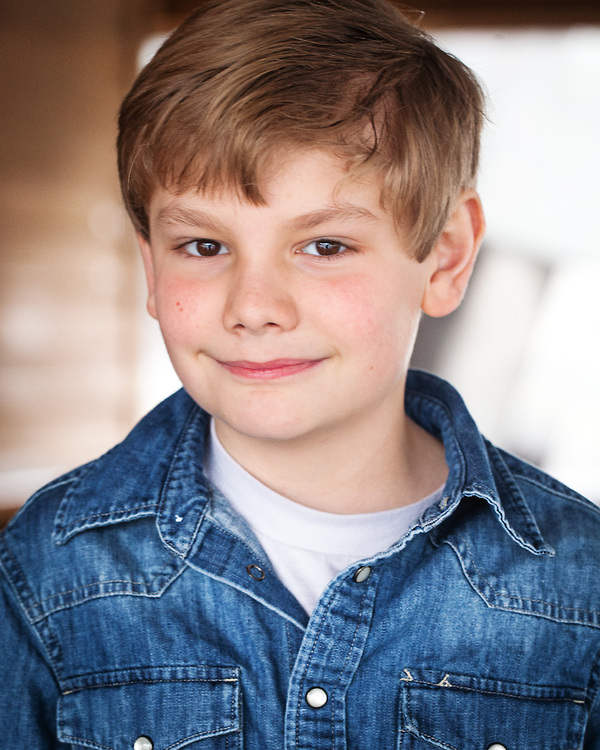
Logan Guleff

- David Galloway — novelist, international art curator, journalist and academic
- Gangsta Boo (1979–2023) — rapper
- TM Garret — author, producer, filmmaker, radio personality, activist
- The Gentrys — 1960s rock band with Larry Raspberry and Larry Wall
- Cassietta George — gospel singer and composer
- David Gest — event and concert producer
- Lee Giles — academic and computer scientist
- Key Glock — rapper
- GloRilla — rapper
- Ginnifer Goodwin — actress
- Robert Gordon — filmmaker and writer
- Clare Grant — actress
- Leonard Graves — actor
- Al Green — singer, musician
- Larkin Grimm — folk singer
- Logan Guleff — MasterChef Junior Season 2 winner
- Gyft — rapper signed to E1 Music, known for his single "They Just Don't Know"

== H ==
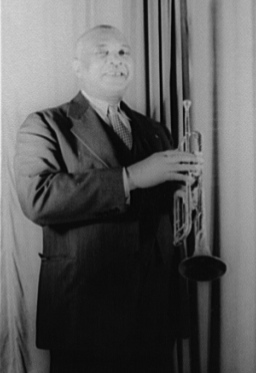
W.C. Handy

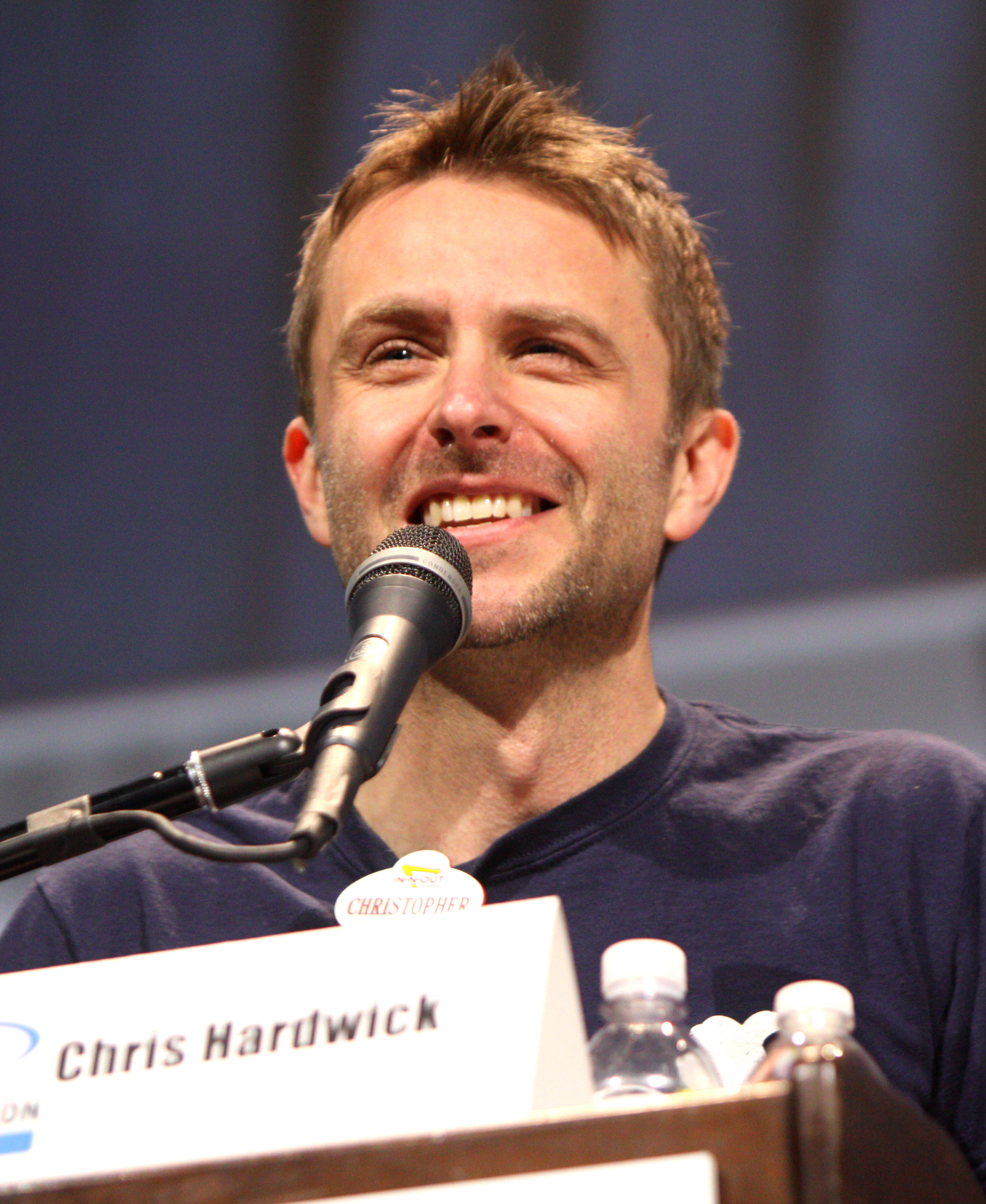
Chris Hardwick

- Lucy Hale — singer and actress
- Richard Halliburton — explorer and author
- George Hamilton — actor
- W.C. Handy — musician
- Anne Haney — actress
- Rebecca Hanover — (B.A. English/creative writing 2001), television writer
- Anfernee "Penny" Hardaway — former NBA player, NCAA Basketball coach
- Lee Harris — mayor of Shelby County and member of the Tennessee General Assembly
- E. Hunter Harrison — CEO of Canadian Pacific Railway
- Jimmy Hart — singer, pro wrestling personality
- Lori Harvey — model
- Jon Hassell — musician
- Isaac Hayes — actor and musician
- Samuel Henderson — former slave and Catholic convert
- Austin Hollins (born 1991) — basketball player for Maccabi Tel Aviv of the Israeli Basketball Premier League
- Olivia Holt — singer and actress
- John Lee Hooker — blues musician
- Benjamin L. Hooks — civil rights activist and executive director of the NAACP
- Julia Britton Hooks — musician and civil rights activist
- Howlin' Wolf — blues musician in the Rock and Roll Hall of Fame
- Lewis C. Hudson — brigadier general in the Marine Corps
- John Hulse — college professor
- Andy Hummel — musician
- Alberta Hunter — singer

== I ==
- iLoveMemphis (real name Richard Colbert) — rapper
- Ingram Hill — band

== J ==
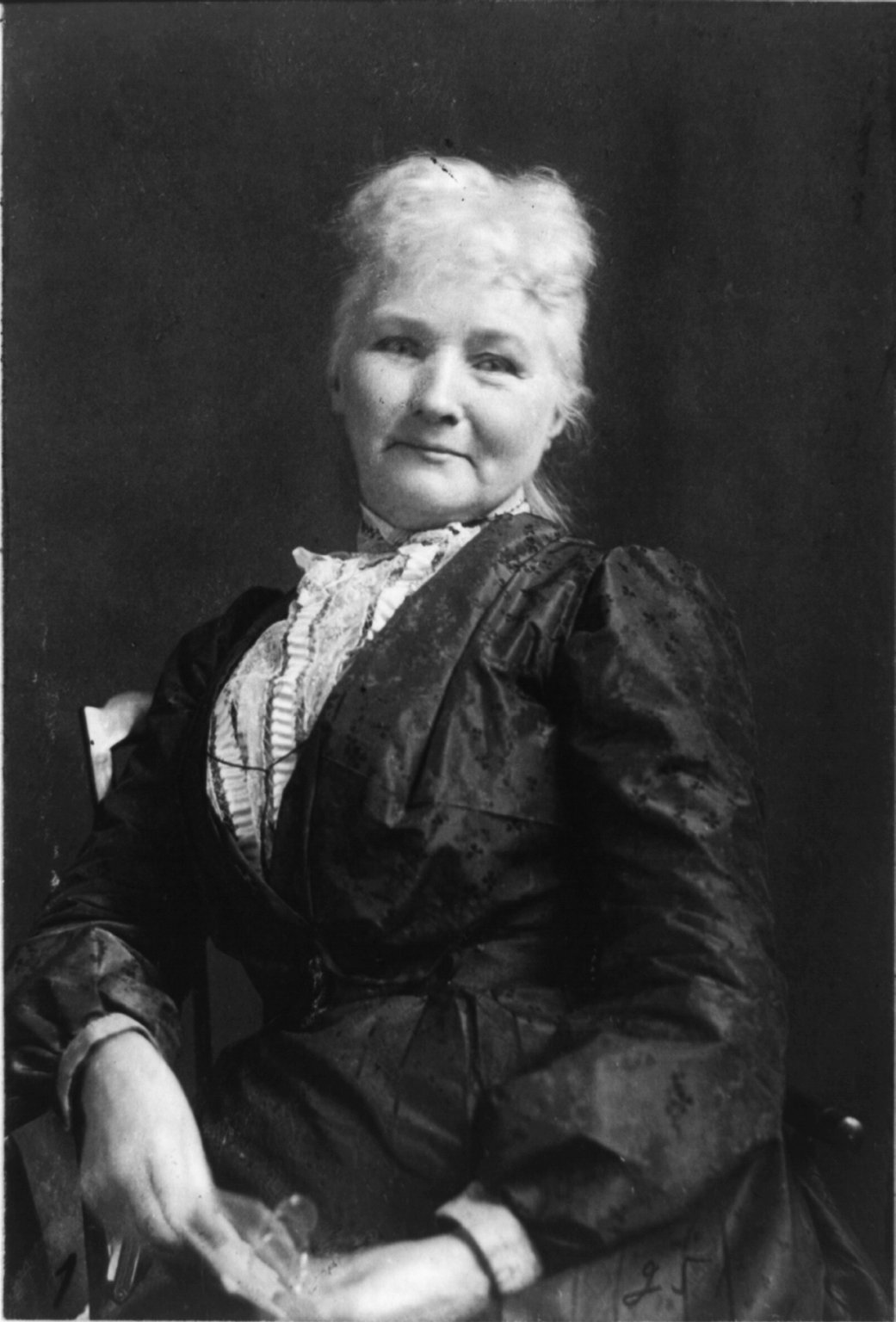
Mother Jones

- Al Jackson Jr. — musician
- Quinton "Rampage" Jackson — mixed martial arts fighter
- Raji Jallepalli — Indian-born chef and restaurateur
- Jimi Jamison — singer, songwriter
- Roland Janes — musician; producer
- Josh Jasper — All-American college football placekicker
- John Wayles Jefferson — mixed-race grandson of Thomas Jefferson and Sally Hemings, colonel in the Union Army, cotton broker in Memphis after the Civil War
- Michael Jeter — actor
- Ashley Jones — actress
- Booker T. Jones — musician
- Leslie Jones — actress known for Saturday Night Live and Ghostbusters
- Mary Harris "Mother" Jones — prominent labor and community organizer
- Mary Jane Richardson Jones — abolitionist and activist
- Rich Jones (born 1946) — basketball player
- Shaw Jones (born 1969) — actor
- Juicy J — rapper
- Rob Jungklas — musician

== K ==
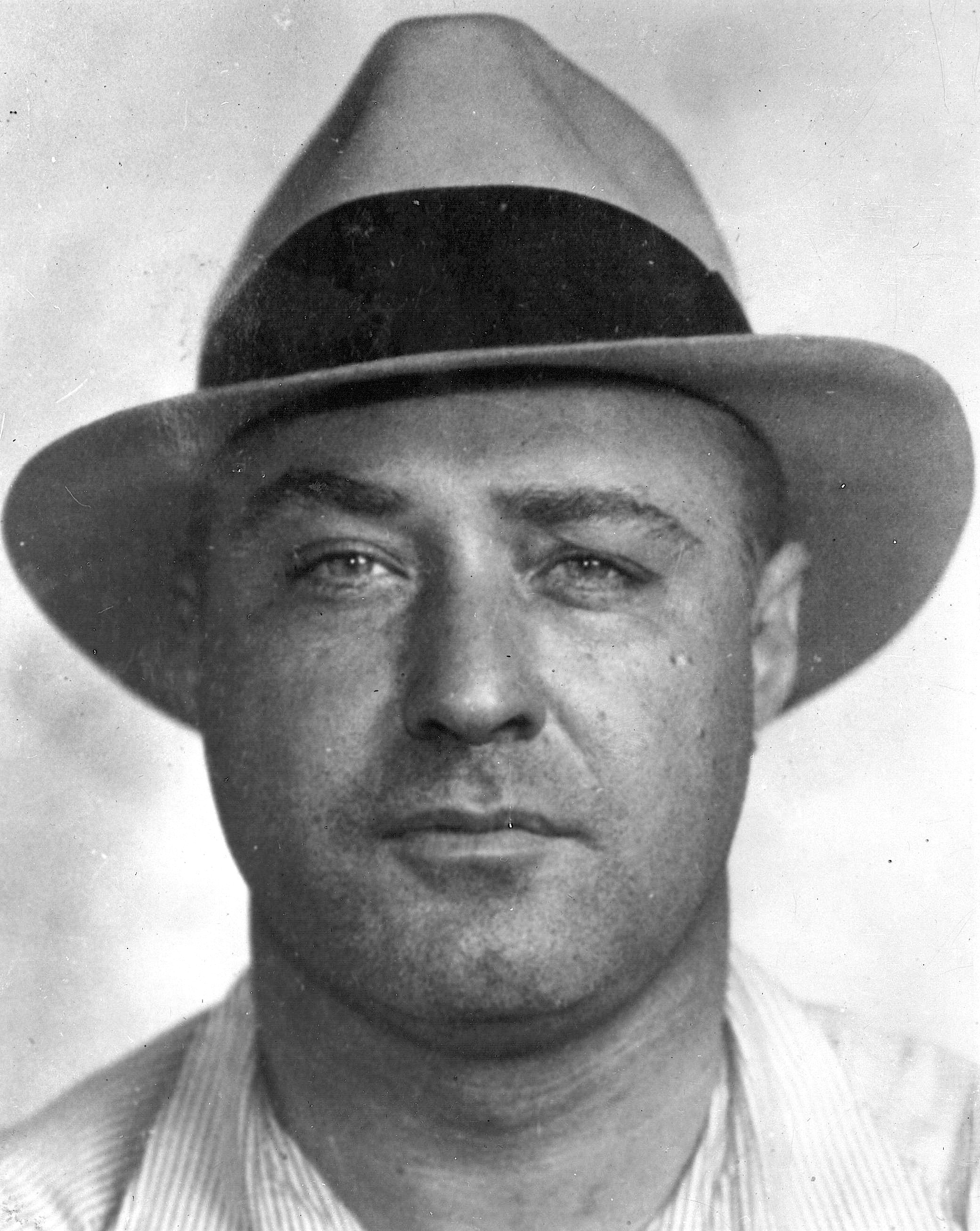
Machine Gun Kelly

- K. Michelle — musician
- Florence Kahn — early Ibsen actress and wife of Max Beerbohm
- The Kat — professional wrestler
- Makky Kaylor — professional songwriter, recording artist, entertainer, and radio personality
- Tay Keith — record producer
- George "Machine Gun" Kelly — Great Depression-era bank robber and kidnapper
- Larry Kenon — basketball player, led Memphis State to 1973 NCAA title game
- Carlton W. Kent — Sergeant Major of the Marine Corps
- Key Glock — rapper, cousin to Young Dolph
- Albert King — blues musician
- B.B. King — blues musician
- Betty Klepper — scientist
- Francis M. Kneeland — early African American physician who located her practice on Beale Street
- David Kustoff — U.S. representative for Tennessee

== L ==
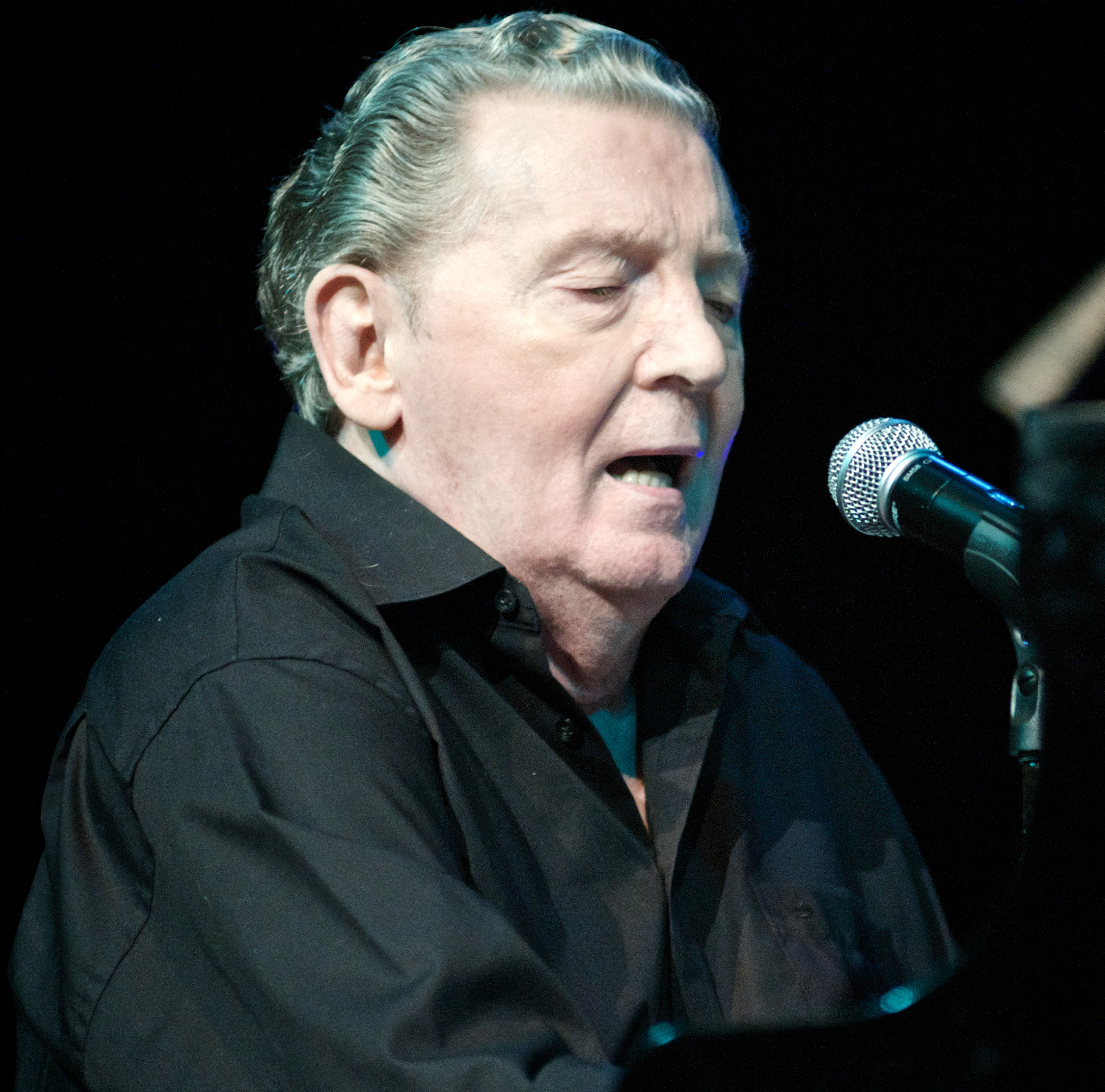
Jerry Lee Lewis

- Snooky Lanson — singer and television personality
- Chuck Lanza — NFL player
- Brian Lawler — professional wrestler
- Jerry Lawler — professional wrestler
- Arthur Lee (1945–2006) — singer-songwriter
- Fannie Lewis — Cleveland Ohio's longest serving councilwoman
- Furry Lewis — blues musician
- Jerry Lee Lewis — musician
- Eddie Lightfoot — minstrel dancer
- Alan Lightman — novelist and physicist
- Lil Wyte — rapper
- Booker Little — musician
- Charles Lloyd — musician
- London on da Track — record producer
- Lord T & Eloise — musicians
- Andre Lott — football player
- Matt Lucas — singer-songwriter, drummer
- Jimmie Lunceford — musician
- Herb Lusk — NFL player and clergyman

== M ==
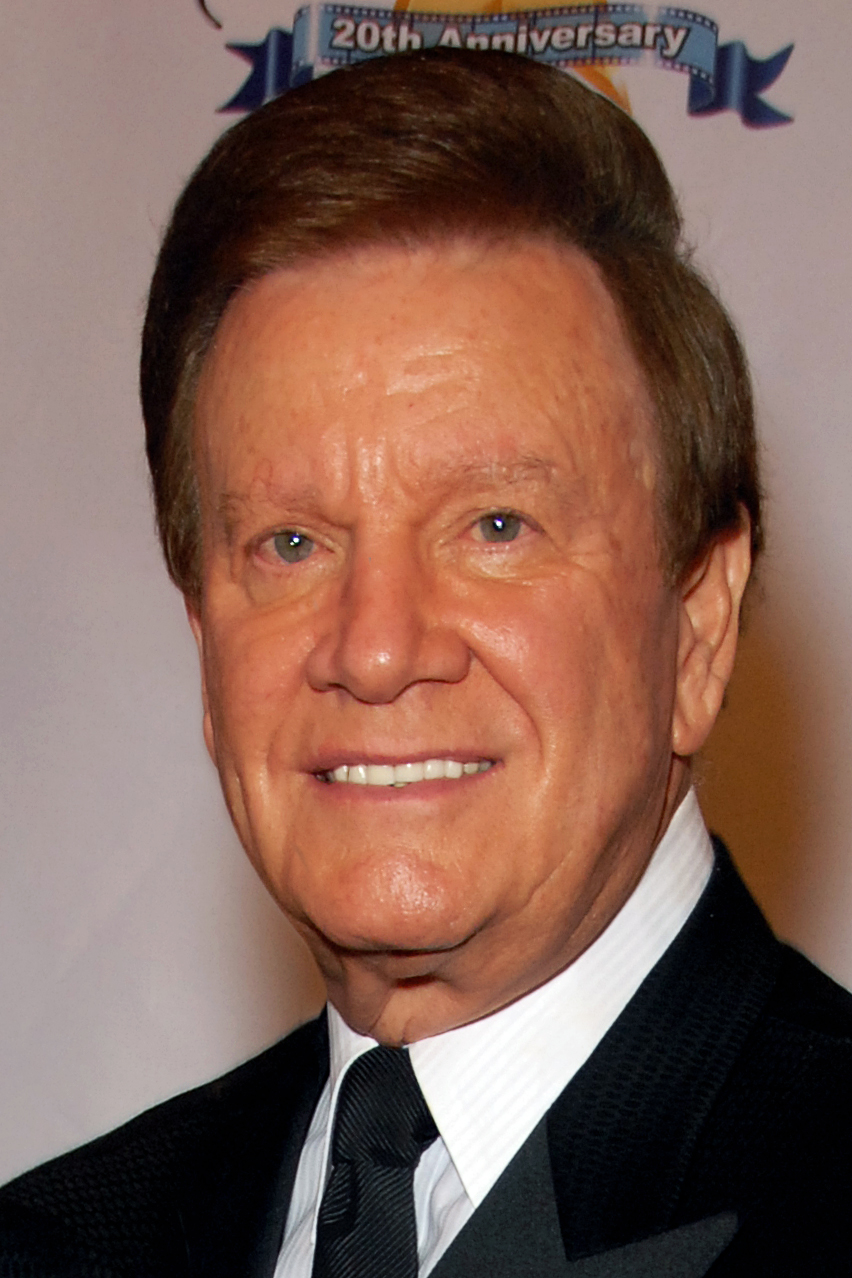
Wink Martindale

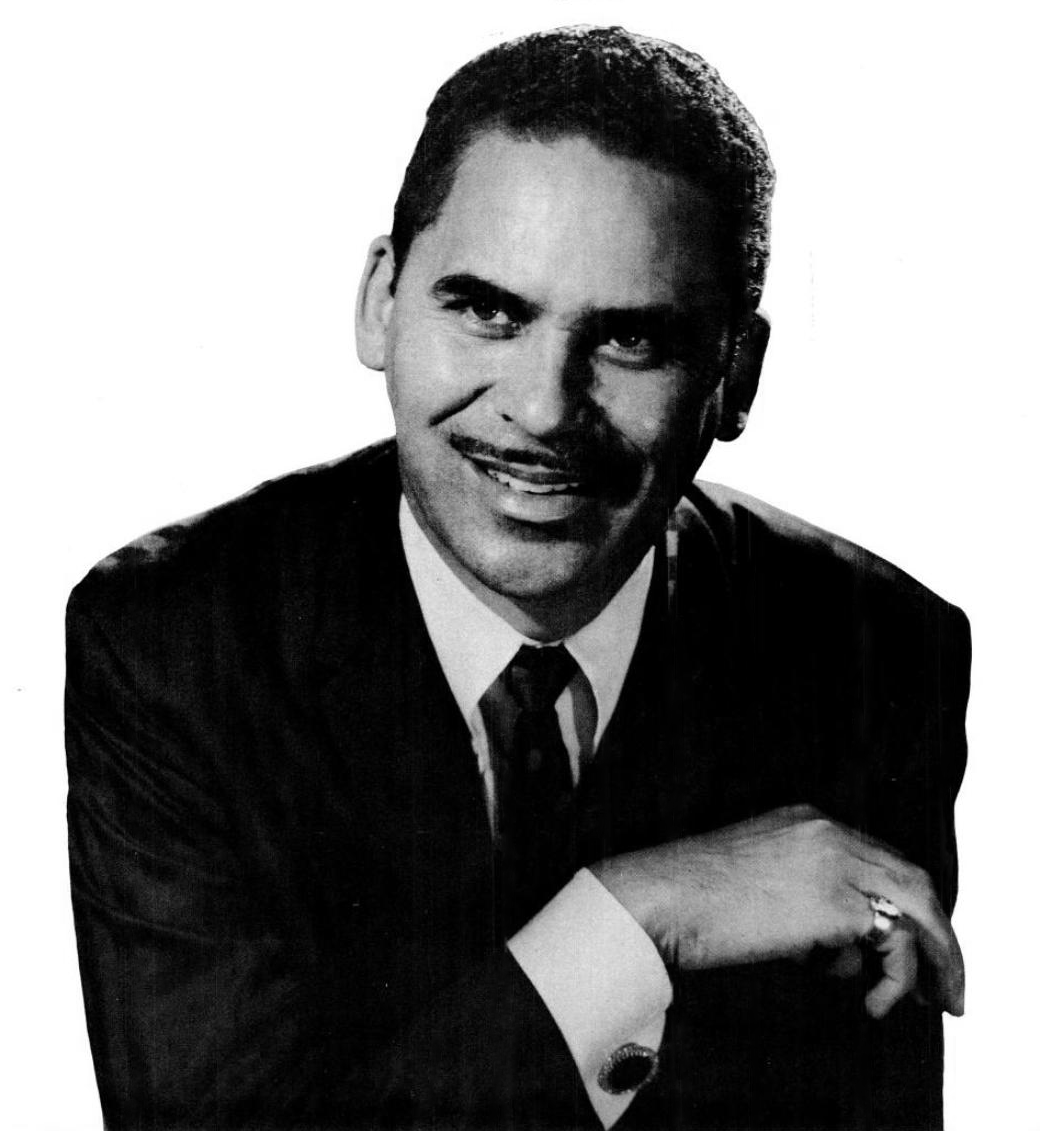
Willie Mitchell

- Jim Mabry — Arkansas Razorbacks football All-American
- Bill Madlock (born 1951) — Major League Baseball player
- Terry Manning — music producer, photographer
- The Mar-Keys — musicians
- Nick Marable — freestyle wrestler who competed for USA's national team
- Wink Martindale — radio and television personality
- Ryan Masson — actor
- Tim McCarver — professional baseball player and broadcaster
- Hilton McConnico — designer and artist
- Kenneth D. McKellar — long-serving U.S. senator
- The Memphis Horns — musicians
- Matthew Melton — musician
- Memphis Minnie — blues singer
- Memphis Slim — musician
- Shaun Micheel — professional golfer
- Cary Middlecoff — professional golfer, Masters and U.S. Open champion
- Ryan Miller — professional hockey player
- Lola Mitchell — musician
- Willie Mitchell — musician and music producer
- Chips Moman — music producer
- Moneybagg Yo (born 1991) — rapper
- Sputnik Monroe — professional wrestler
- Lecrae Moore — musician and music executive
- Scotty Moore — guitarist
- Allen B. Morgan Jr. — businessman, founded Morgan Keegan
- Haley Morris-Cafiero — photographer
- Wendy Moten — singer
- Steven J. Mulroy — district attorney general, law professor
- David W. Mullins Jr. — former vice chairman of the Federal Reserve
- Charlie Musselwhite — blues musician
- Zach Myers — lead guitarist for rock band Shinedown

== N ==
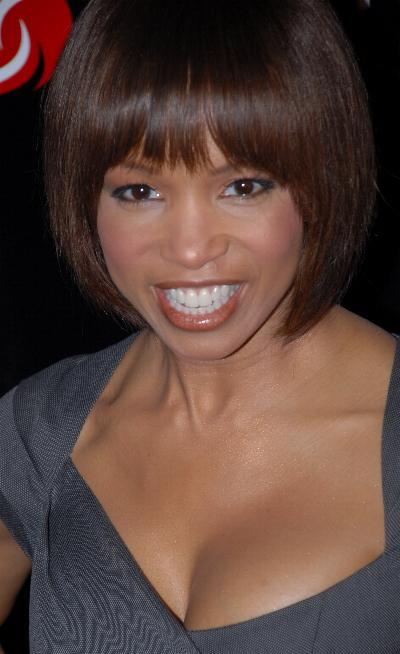
Elise Neal

- Elise Neal (born 1966) — actress
- Hal Needham (1931–2013) — stuntman, film director, actor and writer
- Pat and Gina Neely — celebrity chefs on Food Network
- Johnny Neumann (1950–2019) — basketball player and coach
- Phineas Newborn Jr. (1931–1989) — jazz musician
- Nights Like These — Victory Records metalcore band

== O ==
- Michael Oher — NFL player, subject of The Blind Side
- Roy Orbison — singer

== P ==
- Woody Paige (born 1946) — sportswriter, panelist on ESPN's Around the Horn
- Hermes Pan (1909–1990) — dancer and choreographer
- Cindy Parlow Cone (born 1978) — athlete
- Chris Parnell (born 1967) — actor, known for Saturday Night Live
- Gilbert E. Patterson (1939–2007) — bishop of Church of God in Christ
- DJ Paul — rapper
- Ann Peebles (born 1947) — singer
- Paul Penczner (1916–2010) — Hungarian-born artist
- Art Pennington (1923–2017) — all-star negro league baseball player
- Carl Perkins (1932–1998) — musician
- Luther Perkins (1928–1968) — musician
- Elliot Perry (born 1969) — professional basketball player
- Dewey Phillips (1926–1968) — early rock 'n' roll disc jockey
- Sam Phillips (1923–2003) — founder of Sun Records
- Marguerite Piazza (1920–2012) — opera singer
- Danny Pittman (born 1958) — athlete
- David Porter (born 1941) — musician
- Elvis Presley (1935–1977) — singer and actor
- Lisa Marie Presley (1968–2023) — singer-songwriter; child of singer and actor Elvis Presley
- Project Pat (born 1973) — rapper
- Tommy Prothro (1920–1995) — football coach, UCLA and Los Angeles Rams
- Missi Pyle (born 1972) — actress and singer

== Q ==
- Lisa Quinn (born 1967) — actress, author, designer

== R ==
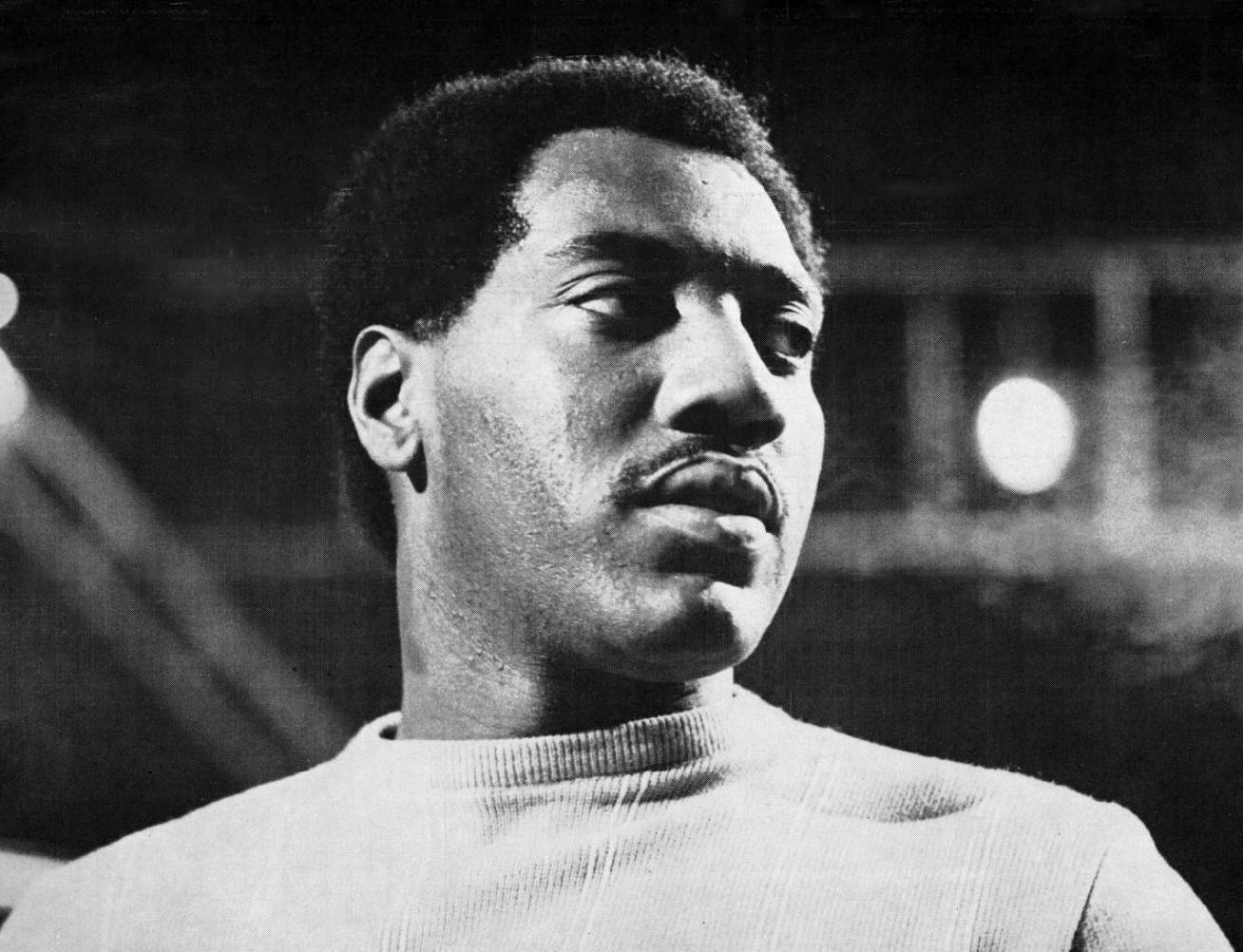
Otis Redding

- Michael Ramirez (born 1961) — editorial cartoonist
- Jay Reatard (1980–2010) — musician
- Otis Redding — musician
- Kennedy J. Reed (1944–2023) — theoretical atomic physicist
- Brent Renaud (1971–2011) — journalist and writer
- Charlie Rich — Grammy Award-winning musician
- Austin Riley — MLB player
- Loren Roberts — professional golfer
- Russell Roberts — economist
- Claire Robinson — television host, author and cook
- Kali Rocha (born 1971) — actress
- Arabella Page Rodman — civic leader
- Adrian Rogers — former pastor of Bellevue Baptist Church and president of the Southern Baptist Convention
- Dalton Rushing (born 2001) — MLB player
- Joe Russell — former world backgammon champion
- Lance Russell — pro wrestling announcer

== S ==
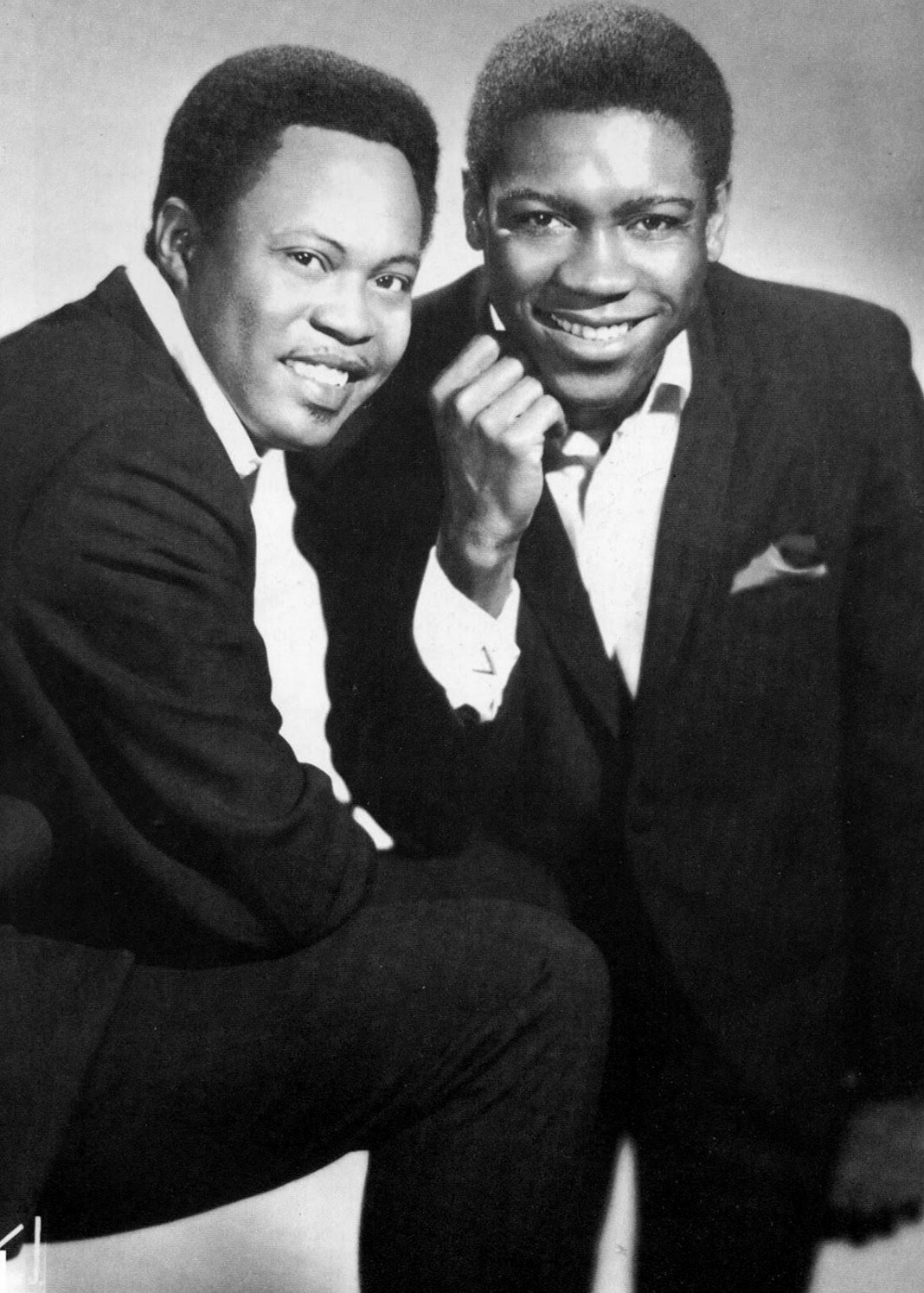
Sam and Dave

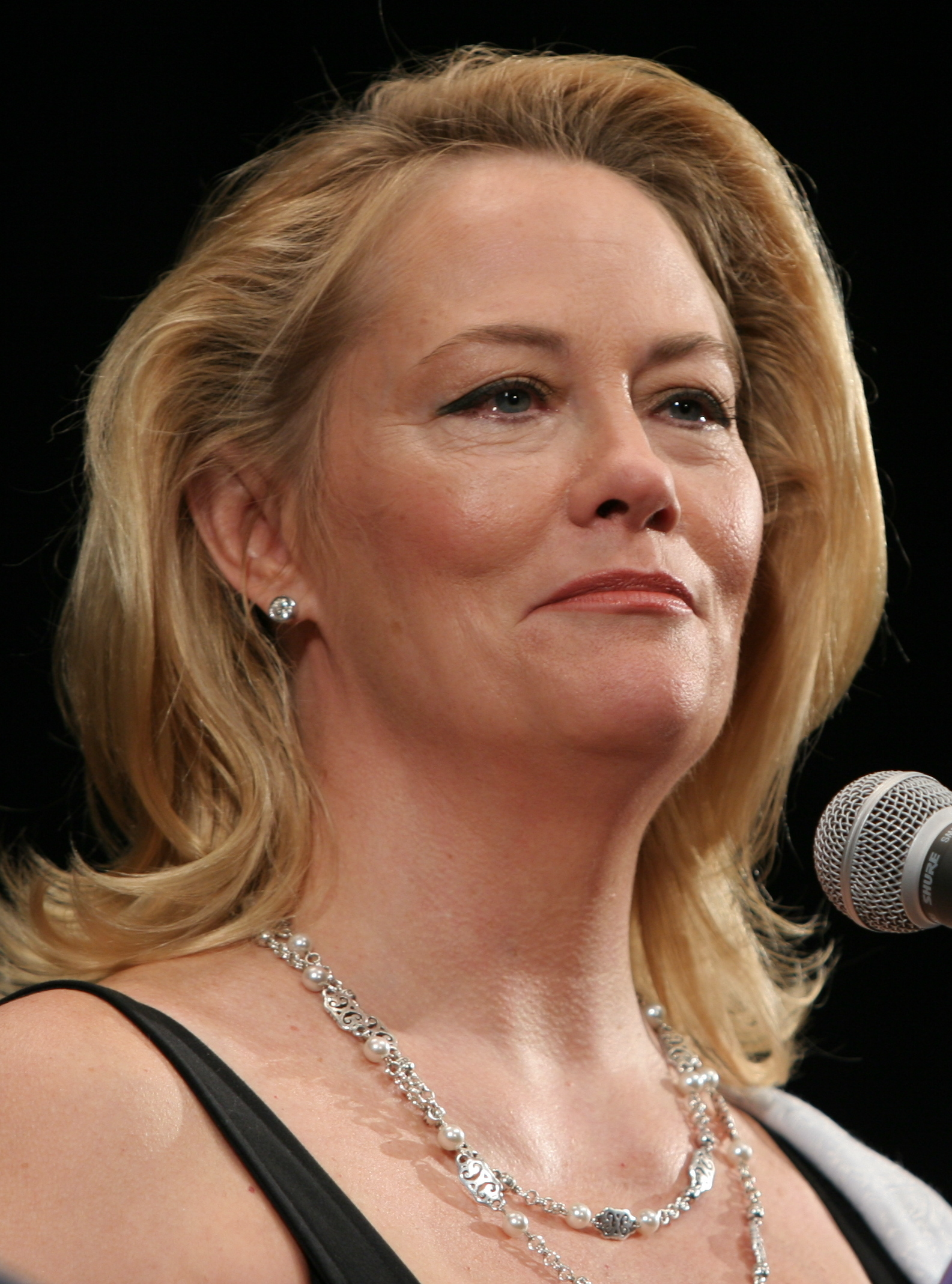
Cybill Shepherd

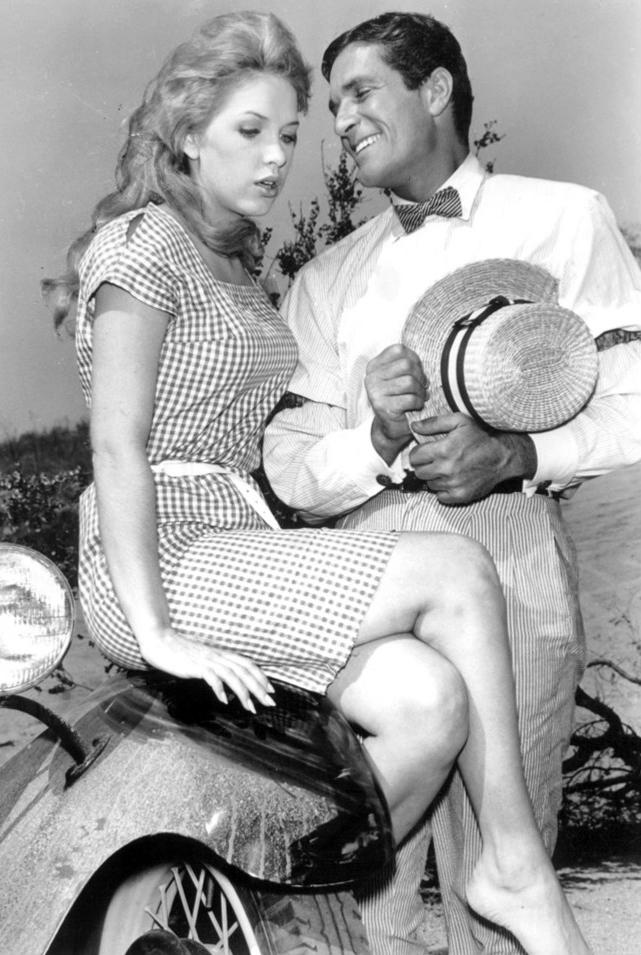
Stella Stevens

- Saliva — musical group
- Sam and Dave (Sam Moore and David Prater) — musicians in the Rock and Roll Hall of Fame
- Sam the Sham — musician, leader of Sam the Sham and the Pharaohs
- William Sanderson — actor known for Newhart and Blade Runner
- J. Peter Sartain — archbishop of Seattle
- Clarence Saunders — founder of the world's first self-service supermarket, Piggly Wiggly
- Jerry Schilling — associate of Elvis Presley, The Beach Boys
- Dan Schneider — actor
- Josey Scott — musician
- Will Shade — musician
- Gwen Shamblin — author and founder of the Weigh Down Workshop and Remnant Fellowship Church
- Paul Shanklin — personality on Rush Limbaugh's radio program
- Patricia Walton Shelby (1928–2002) — 32nd president general of the Daughters of the American Revolution
- Cybill Shepherd — actress known for Moonlighting and Cybill
- Pooh Shiesty (born 1999) — rapper
- George Sherrill — MLB player
- Lee Shippey — journalist
- Hampton Sides — author
- McKinley Singleton — NBA player, New York Knicks
- Arthur Smith — head coach of the Atlanta Falcons
- Bingo Smith (born 1946) — basketball player
- Fred Smith — founder and chairman of FedEx
- Lane Smith — actor known for My Cousin Vinny and The Final Days
- George W. Snedecor (1881–1974) — mathematician and statistician
- Bobby Sowell — musician
- Speech (born 1968) — rapper
- Ben Spies (born 1984) — motorcycle road racer
- Marvin Stamm — musician
- Kay Starr — singer
- Ricky Stenhouse Jr. — NASCAR driver
- Jody Stephens — musician
- Andrew Stevens — actor and producer
- Stella Stevens — actress
- Jim Stewart — record producer and co-founder of Stax Records
- Frank Stokes — blues musician
- Jarnell Stokes (born 1994) — basketball player
- Tyler Stone (born 1991) — basketball player in the Israeli Basketball Premier League
- Lewis Ossie Swingler — editor of Memphis World, editor and publisher of Tri-State Defender

== T ==
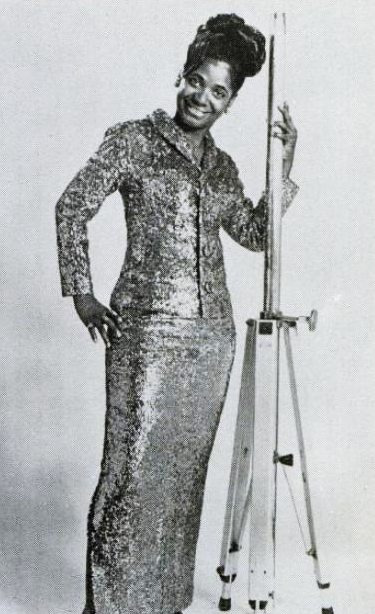
Carla Thomas

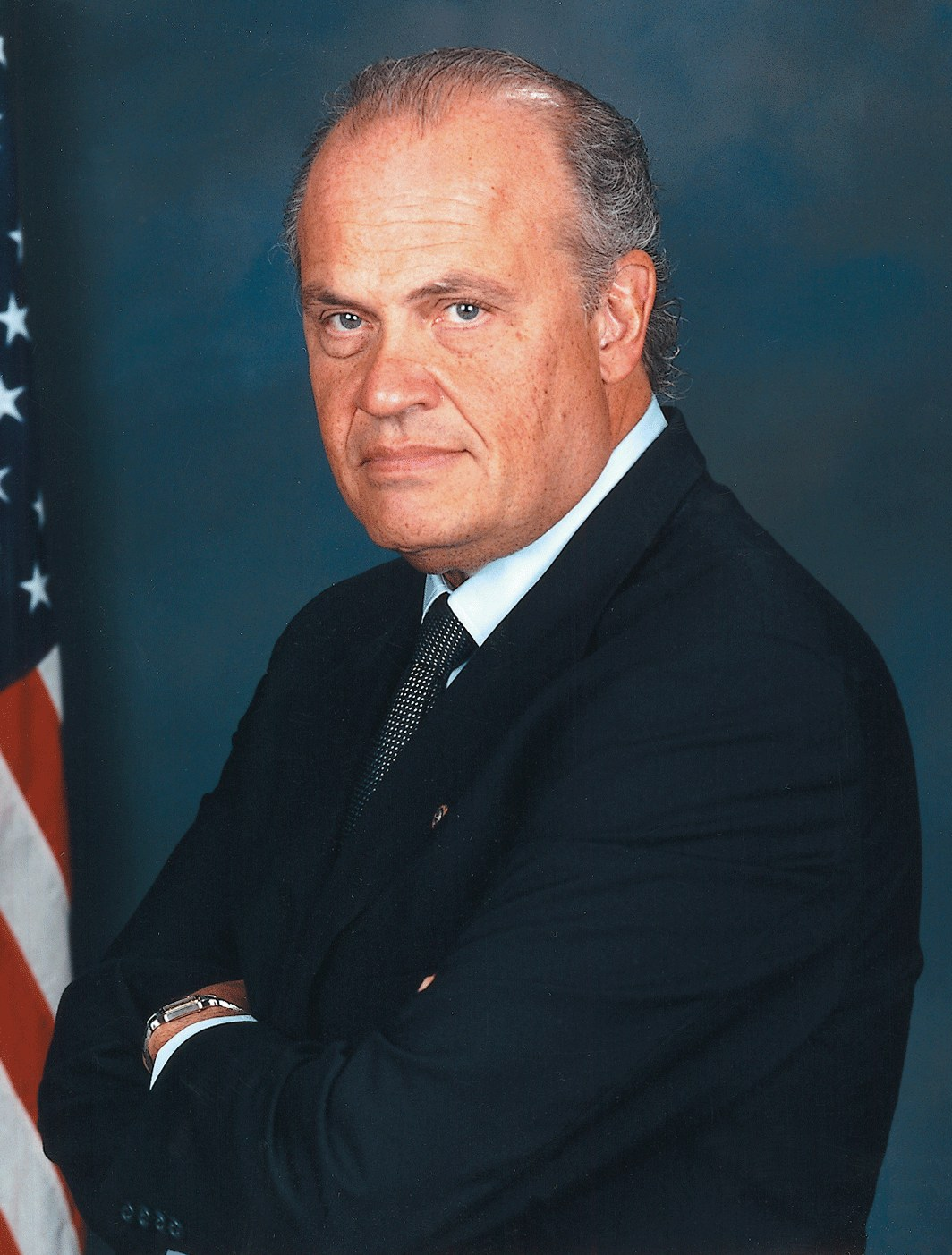
Fred Thompson

- Gary Talley — musician and singer of The Box Tops
- Cliff Taylor — football player
- Raymond Taylor — catcher in Negro league baseball
- Lloyd Thaxton — television personality
- Adonis Thomas (born 1993) — basketball player in the Israeli Basketball Premier League
- Carla Thomas — musician and daughter of Rufus Thomas
- Danny Thomas — entertainer, actor and founder of St. Jude Children's Research Hospital
- Marvell Thomas — keyboardist
- Rufus Thomas — musician
- Vaneese Thomas — musician
- Fred Thompson — actor and U.S. senator (alumnus of the University of Memphis)
- Harry Thompson — football player
- Linda Thompson — songwriter and actress
- Three 6 Mafia — rap musicians
- Justin Timberlake — musician, actor and record producer
- Chris Travis — rapper
- Don Trip — rapper
- Leigh Anne Tuohy — businesswoman and interior designer
- Ike Turner — musician

== V ==
- Guillaume de Van (1906–1949) — Franco–American musicologist
- Marcia Van Dresser (1877–1937) — operatic soprano, recitalist and actress
- Andrew VanWyngarden — musician of psychedelic rock group MGMT
- Alexey Vermeulen (born 1994) — cyclist

== W ==
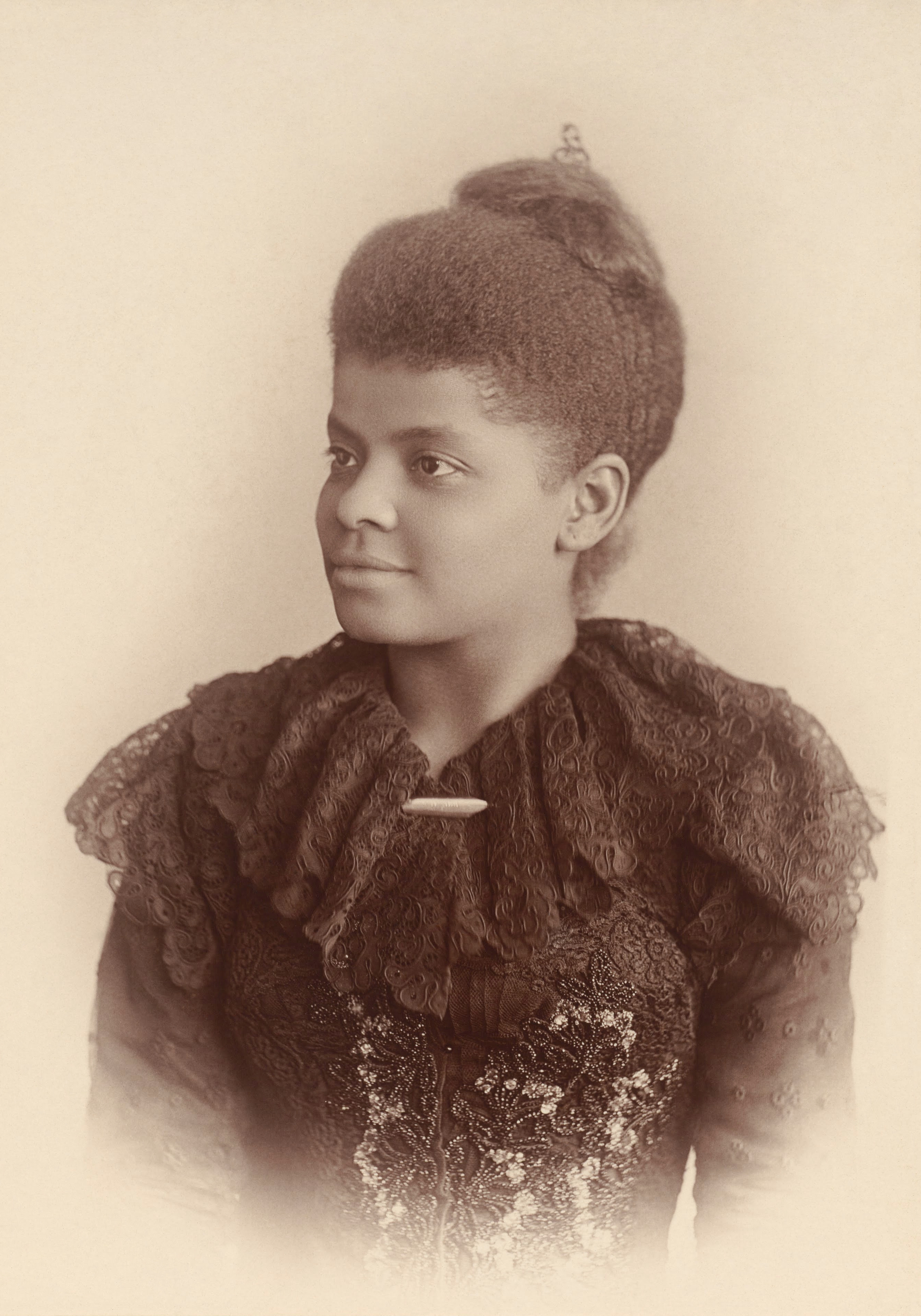
Ida B. Wells

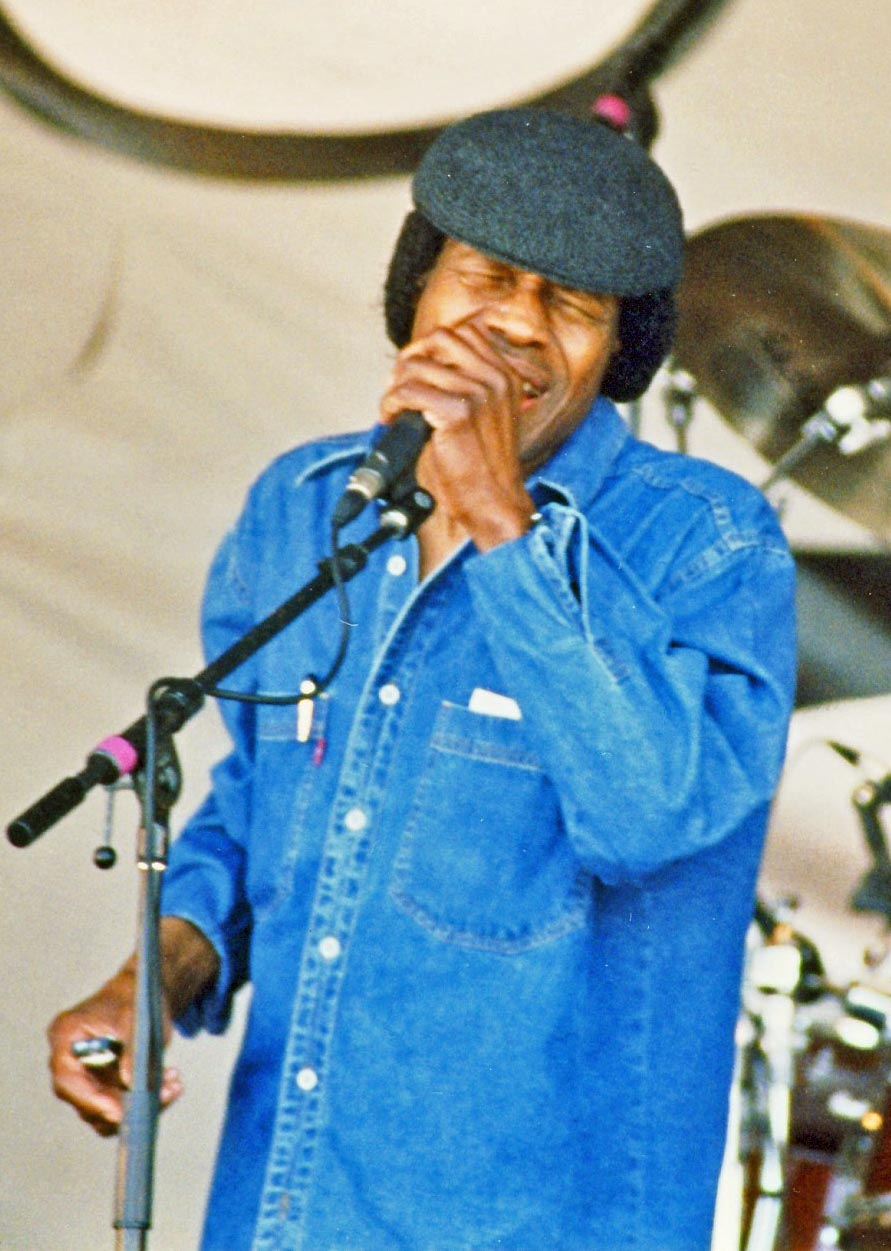
Junior Wells

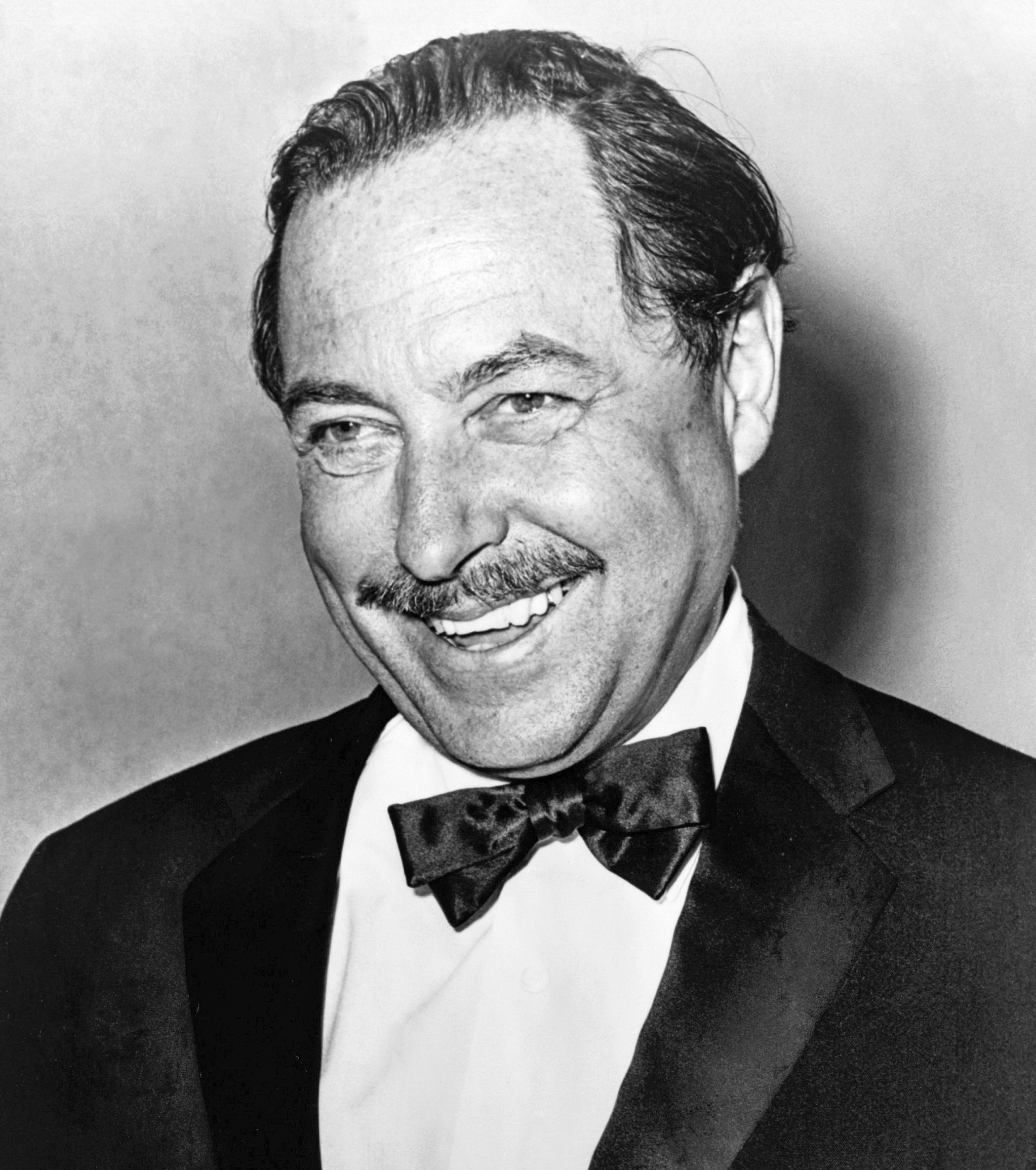
Tennessee Williams

- Barbara Jo Walker (1926–2000) — Miss America 1947
- Sam Walton — football player
- Teddy Walton — composer, producer, writer and DJ
- Garrett Wang — actor
- Anita Ward — singer and schoolteacher; 1979 number one Billboard Hot 100 single "Ring My Bell"
- Luke J. Weathers (1920–2011) — former U.S. Army Air Force officer and member of Tuskegee Airmen
- Ida B. Wells — civil rights advocate and women's rights advocate
- Junior Wells — musician
- David West — baseball player
- Red West — actor
- Kirk Whalum — musician
- Maurice White — musician, lead singer of Earth, Wind & Fire
- Reggie White — NFL player; began his career with the Memphis Showboats of the USFL
- Bobby Whitlock — musician, keyboardist in Derek and the Dominos
- Snootie Wild — rapper
- John Shelton Wilder — politician
- Elliot Williams — NBA player
- LaNell Williams — physicist and virologist
- Louis Williams — NBA player
- Steven Williams — actor
- Tennessee Williams — playwright
- Kemmons Wilson — businessman, founder of Holiday Inn
- Mike Wilson — NBA player
- Jesse Winchester — singer-songwriter
- Francis Winkler — NFL player
- Ernest Withers — photojournalist
- Lorenzen Wright — NBA player

== Y ==
- Roy Yeager — musician
- Yo Gotti (born 1981) — rapper; born Mario Mims
- Paul Young — mayor
- Thaddeus Young — NBA player (grew up in Memphis)
