= List of mayors of Athens, Georgia =

City of Athens, Georgia mayors

The following is a list of mayors of the city of Athens, Georgia, United States.

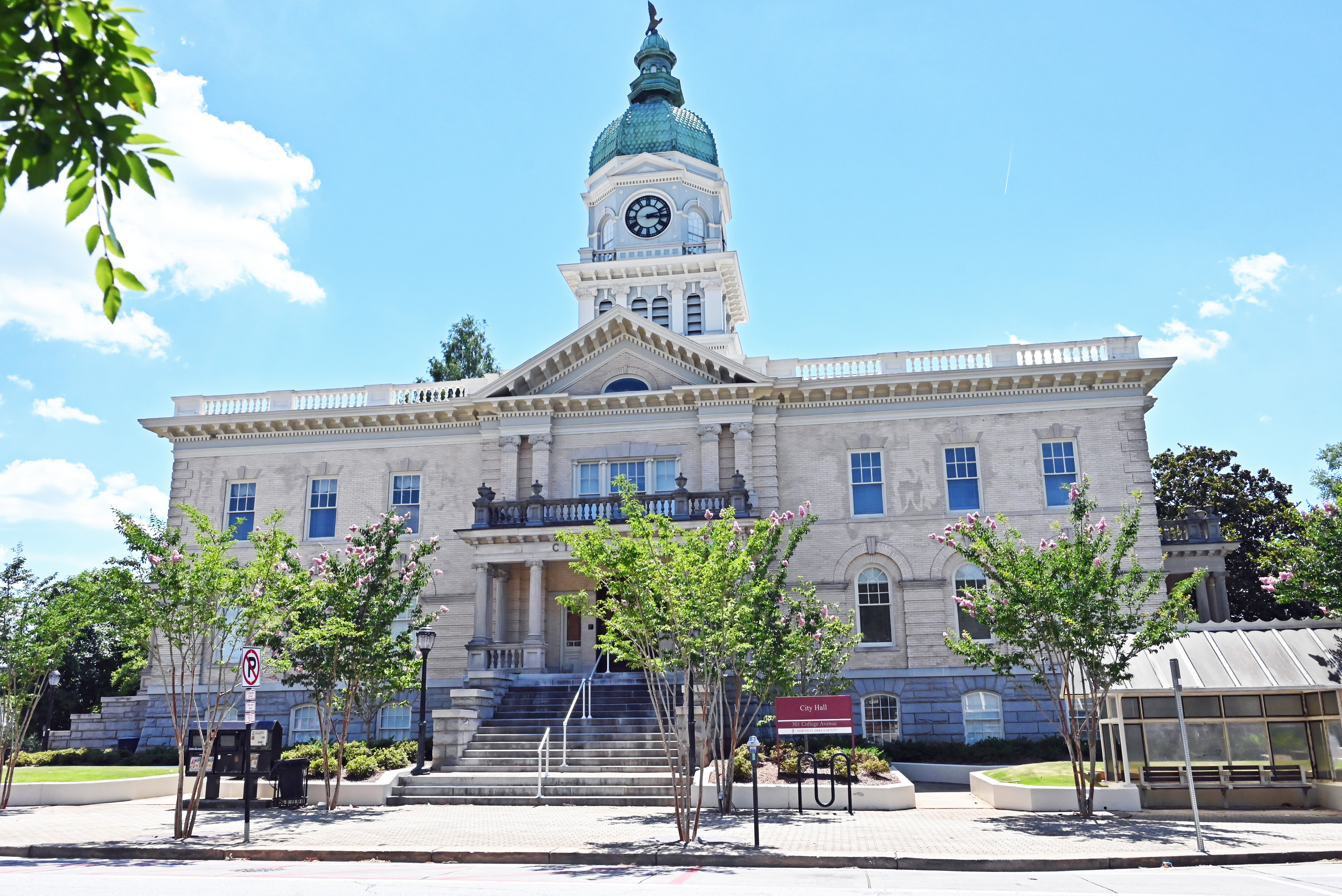
City Hall in Athens in 2022

== Prior to 1991 ==
- Henry Carlton Tuck, 1892–1893
- J.J. Crittenden McMahan, ca.1897
- Edward Thomas Brown
- Edward I. Smith, ca.1900
- William F. Dorsey, ca.1906–1909
- Hugh Jackson Rowe, ca.1912
- Robert O. Arnold, ca.1916
- Andrew Cobb Erwin, 1918–1922
- Alonzo Gordon Dudley, 1926–1935, 1938–1939
- T. S. Mell, ca.1937
- Bob McWhorter, 1940–1947
- Jack R. Wells, ca.1951–1956
- Ralph M. Snow, ca.1958–1959
- Upshaw Bentley, 1977–1980

== Since 1991 ==
In 1990, the governments of Clarke County and the city of Athens merged to form the Athens-Clarke County unified government.

- Gwen O'Looney, 1991–1998
- Doc Eldridge, 1999–2003
- Heidi Davison, 2003–2011
- Nancy Denson, 2011–2019
- Kelly Girtz, 2019–2027
- Dexter Fisher, 2027–

== See also ==
- Timeline of Athens, Georgia
