= Girtz =

Girtz is a surname. Notable people with the surname include:

- Brandon Girtz (born 1985), American mixed martial artist
- Kelly Girtz (born 1971), American politician
