= Lanell =

Lanell or LaNell is a given name. Notable people with the name include:

- Lanell Cofer (1948–2018), American politician and lawyer
- Lanell Tyrone Culver (born 1983), American football player
- LaNell Williams (born 1993), American physicist and virologist

== See also ==
- Lanelle Tanangada (born 1979), Solomon Islands teacher and politician
