= Georgia's 59th House of Representatives district =

State district in Georgia, USA

Georgia's 59th State House of Representatives district
Representative
| Phil Olaleye; D–Atlanta |
- Demographics: 35.7% White; 53.3% Black; 8.3% Hispanic; 1.1% Asian
- Population: 56,763

District 59 elects one member of the Georgia House of Representatives. It contains parts of Fulton County.

== Members ==
- Margaret Kaiser (2007–2017)
- David Dreyer (2017–2023)
- Phil Olaleye (since 2023)
