= Margaret Kaiser =

American politician

Margaret D. Kaiser

Member of the Georgia House of Representatives from the 59th district
- In office 2007–2017
- Succeeded by: David Dreyer

Personal details
- Born: August 2nd
- Party: Democratic
- Parent: Nancy Denson (mother)

Margaret Kaiser is a former state representative from Georgia. She is a member of the Democratic Party.

== Personal life and education ==
Kaiser graduated from Emory University. She is married to Eric Kaiser, who owns Grant Central and Grant Central East Pizza. The couple also founded Cabbagetown Grill, although Margaret Kaiser sold her half. Currently, Kaiser serves as President of her family’s small business, Kaiser Dough and Pizza Concepts.

Kaiser's mother, Nancy Denson, served as the Mayor of Athens, Georgia, approximately hour and a half east of Atlanta.

Kaiser’s oldest son Willem is a member of the SCAD Atlanta cycling team.

== Political career ==
Kaiser worked for the Carter Center after graduation. She was sworn into the Georgia House of Representatives in 2007 for District 59. Kaiser served on the Agriculture & Consumer Affairs, Appropriations, Education, and Health & Human Services committees.

Kaiser supported a failed constitutional amendment that would have allowed the state to create charter schools.

Kaiser announced that she was one of the first people to register for the 2017 Atlanta mayoral election on March 12, 2015. However, she announced that she was dropping out of the crowded field on October 25, 2016.
