= Phil Olaleye =

American politician

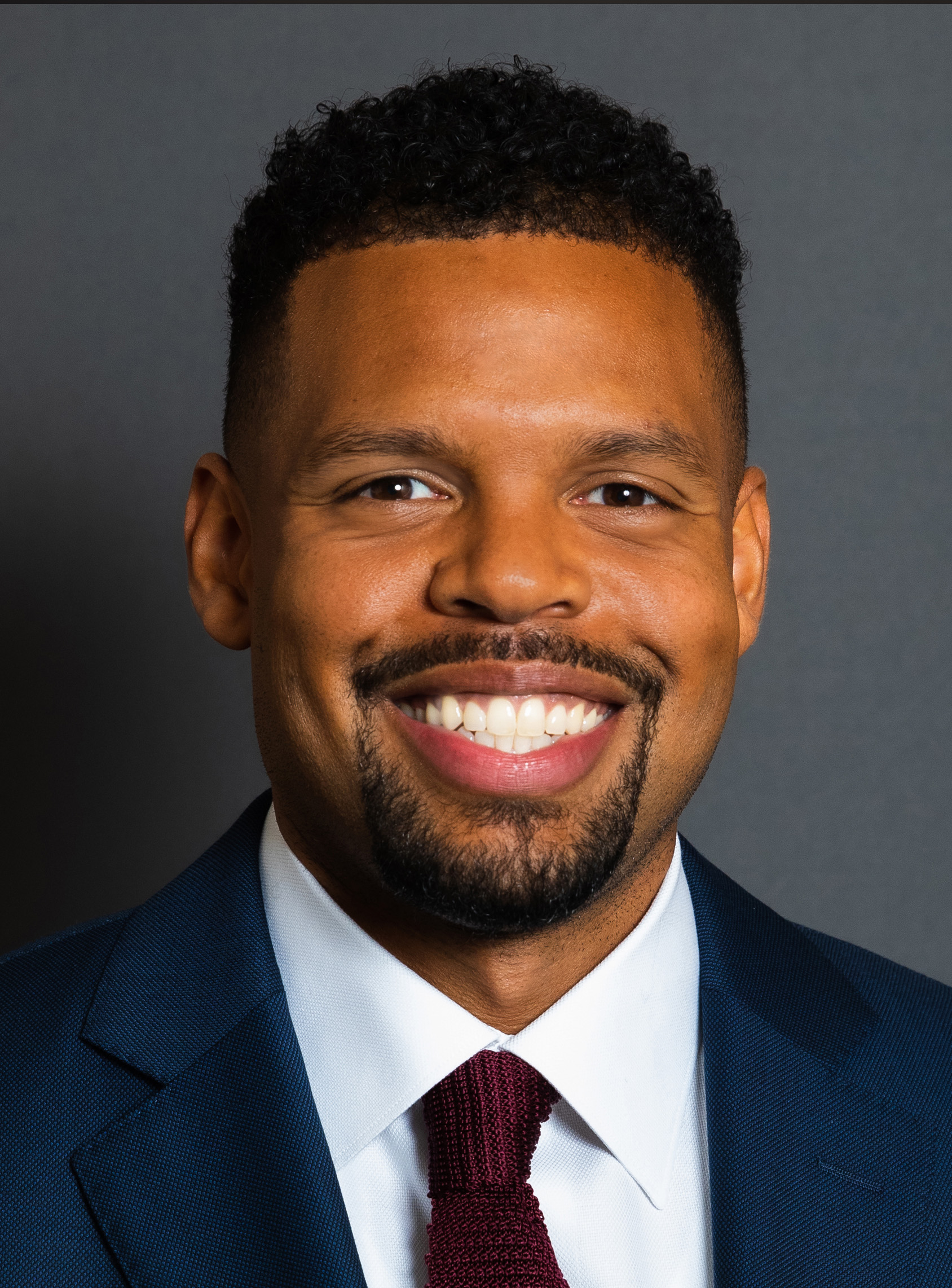

Member of the Georgia House of Representatives from the 59th district
- Incumbent
- Assumed office January 9, 2023
- Preceded by: David Dreyer

Personal details
- Party: Democratic
- Spouse: Sabrina
- Education: Duke University; Harvard Kennedy School

Phillip Olaleye is an American politician and the former executive director of a non-profit educational foundation.

== Early life and education ==
Phil grew up in Stone Mountain, Georgia. In 2007, he received his first degree from Duke University and in 2014 he earned his master's degree in public policy from the Harvard Kennedy School of Government. He also served as a United States Peace Corps volunteer in the Philippines.

== Political career ==
He was elected on November 8, 2022, as a legislator at the 2022 US midterm elections representing Georgia House of Representatives District 59 under the Democratic Party, and he took office on January 9, 2023.
