= David Dreyer =

American politician

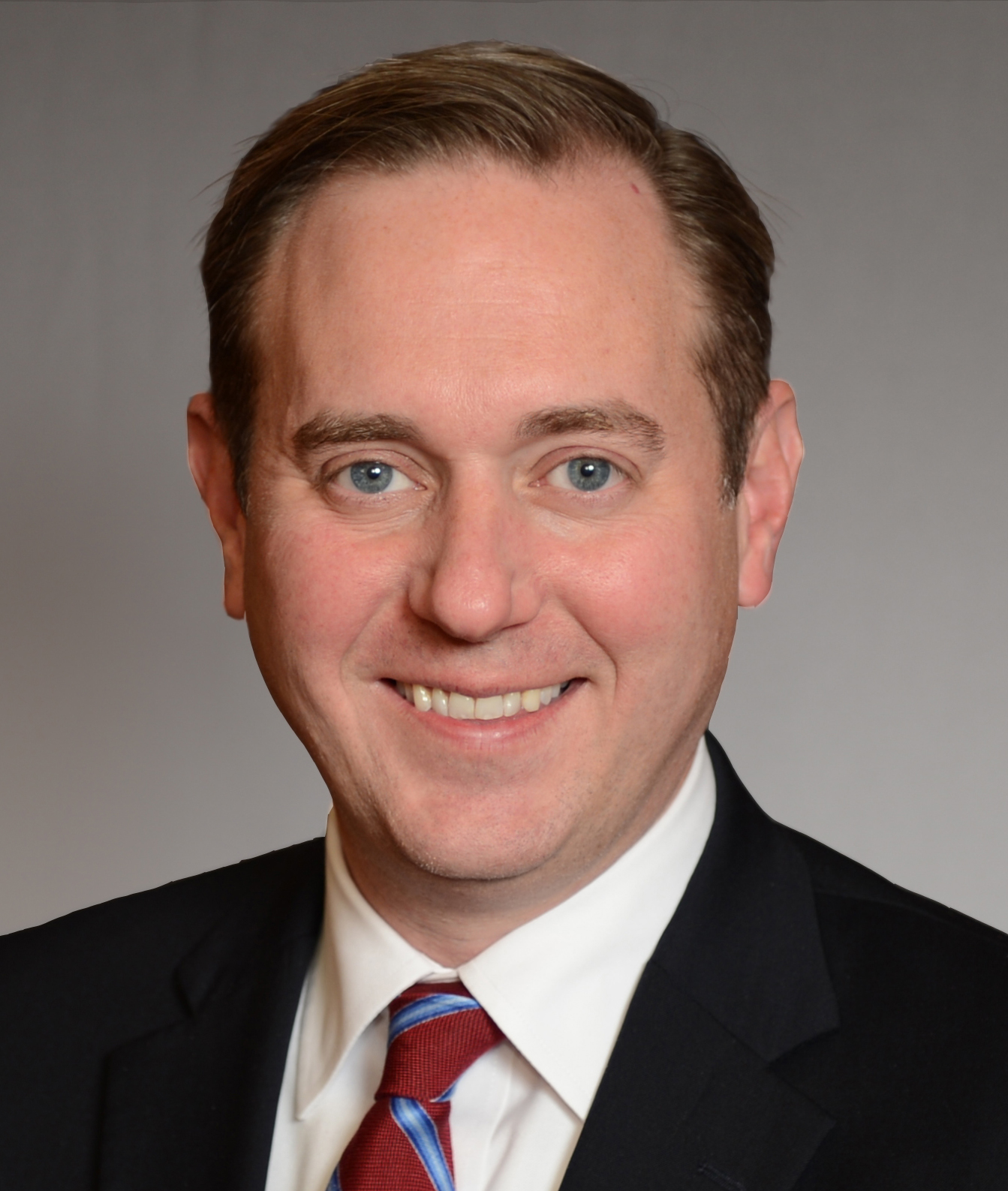

Member of the Georgia House of Representatives from the 59th district
- In office January 9, 2017 – January 9, 2023
- Preceded by: Margaret Kaiser
- Succeeded by: Tanya Miller (Redistricting)

Personal details
- Born: May 14, 1974 (age 52) Ringgold, Georgia
- Party: Democratic
- Profession: Attorney

David Norman Dreyer (born May 14, 1974) is a former member of the Georgia House of Representatives and a member of the Democratic Party representing District 59.

== Personal life and education ==
Dreyer was born in Ringgold, Georgia and attended middle school in Roswell. He received a degree in Political Science and Religious Studies at Georgia State University in 2001. Later, Dreyer graduated from Emory University School of Law in 2004 after focusing on constitutional law and voter protection.

== Career ==
Dreyer is a partner at Dreyer Sterling LLC, a law firm practicing in the areas of trial and litigation.

Dreyer was first elected to the Georgia House of Representatives in 2016. He currently serves on the Higher Education, Judiciary, and Science and Technology committees in the Georgia House.

In 2019, Dreyer represented State Senator Nikema Williams after she had been arrested during a protest over counting votes for the 2018 Georgia gubernatorial election.

Georgia House of Representatives
Preceded by Margaret Kaiser	Member of the Georgia House of Representatives from the 59th district 2017–2023	Succeeded by Phil Olaleye
