= Rebecca Hanover =

- Born: January 26, 1979 (age 46); Memphis, Tennessee, United States
- Occupation: Television writer
- Spouse: Ethan Kurzweil

Rebecca Hanover (born January 26, 1979) is an American television writer and young adult author. She was born in Memphis, Tennessee and attended Stanford University, where she graduated in 2001 with a degree in English/creative writing and drama. In 2007, she won a Daytime Emmy Award for her work on the soap opera, Guiding Light. Her first young adult novel, The Similars, will be published on January 1, 2019.

== Positions held ==
Guiding Light

- Writer (May 24, 2005 - September 18, 2009)
- Assistant to the Writers (2003 - 2006)

== Awards and nominations ==
Daytime Emmy Award

- Win, 2007, Best Writing, Guiding Light
- Nomination, 2008, Best Writing, Guiding Light

Writers Guild of America Award

- Nomination, 2006, Best Writing, Guiding Light

== Bibliography ==
The Similars (January, 2019) - Sometime in the not too distant future, 6 clones begin attending a prestigious boarding school attended by prodigies, the children of the ultra-powerful and minor celebrities. The problem is, all 6 clones (who call themselves The Similars,) are cloned from students already enrolled in the school, except for Levi, who is the clone of Oliver, a former student who recently died by suicide. Emma, Oliver's grieving best friend is determined to avoid Levi at all costs, until several violent incidents and a secret society bring them together in unexpected ways.

The Pretenders (December, 2019) - Sequel to The Similars.
