= Stipple (company) =

- Type: Private
- Founded: 2010
- Founder: Rey Flemings
- Headquarters: San Francisco
- Website: stippleit.com (defunct)

Stipple is a defunct company founded in 2010 that provided a platform for the tagging of people, places, and objects inside of images.

== History ==
Co-founder and CEO Rey Flemings launched Stipple in August 2010, when the company released its first public offering. Seed funding amounting to $2 million was secured from people and companies including Kleiner Perkins Caufield & Byers, Floodgate Ventures, Justin Timberlake, Eghosa Omoigui, Quest Ventures, Naval Ravikant, Matt Mullenweg, and Rick Marini.

In 2011, Stipple launched Stipple Lens, which allowed photo agencies to earn money from images they upload to Stipple. Stipple Pipeline allowed brands to tag their products in photos uploaded to Stipple. Through Stipple Network, the photos were open to use by website publishers, who were paid by companies with products in the photos. Consumers could then click on the products tagged and buy them. As of May 2011, Stipple had contracts with nine photo agencies, 50 brands, and 1,300 publishers.

On September 20, 2011, Stipple launched Stipple Marketplace, a product that allows advertising to be delivered via images. Gigaom said Marketplace is an alternative to the expensive practice of obtaining images from stock photo agencies.

Stipple was acquired by an undisclosed firm in a private transaction and the product was eventually shuttered.

== Stipple ==
The Stipple platform facilitated the tagging of products and people in images. Stipple tags appeared when a user's cursor entered the frame of the image. Publishers enabled Stipple by adding JavaScript code to their websites. Tagged items from one image automatically propagated to other images in Stipple's network with the same item.

TechCrunch called Stipple "AdWords For Images".
