= Paul Penczner =

American artist (1916–2010)

Paul Joseph Penczner (September 17, 1916 – June 27, 2010) was a Hungarian-American artist.

Portrait of Carol Gage

== Early life ==
The artist was born in Jászfényszaru, a small town near Budapest, Hungary. As a child, he showed talent in art. One of his greatest accomplishments in life, per Penczner, was “when Pope Pius XII accepted a series of my works, which I created to commemorate the founding of a Hungarian religious order. I was so very young, but honored by his acceptance.” During World War II, he was a second lieutenant in the Hungarian army, then serving in alliance with the Wehrmacht under the direction of Germany's Nazi regime. Near the city of Cegled, he was wounded by a Soviet T34 tank and suffered damage to his eyesight. He was later transferred to the western front. At the end of the war, he was held for a number of months by Allied forces. After being released, he applied for immigration to the United States. While awaiting permission to immigrate, he spent several years painting portraits and landscapes in Europe.

== Career ==
In 1951, Penczner came to the United States with his German born wife, Jolanda. They settled in Memphis, Tennessee. Commissions for portraits began almost immediately. He spent the next fifty five years in Memphis, where he established the Penczner Fine Art Studio. During this time, he painted the portraits of many well known southerners, including Governor Winfield Dunn. For many years, he taught drawing, painting, and portraiture. Penczner was a member of the Pi Kappa Alpha fraternity.

The artists' styles have included realism, impressionism, surrealism, and what Penczner terms as "Time Expressionism". Media has included oil, watercolor, pen and ink, pencil, acrylic, and most recently an innovative style which he calls "oil graphics" - a technique employing wax pencils and similar instruments pressed into wet oil paint.

=== Falling Stars ===
His major artwork is "Falling Stars". The theme of this painting is the history of Twentieth Century Europe from a Hungarian point of view. Images include the Treaty of Trianon, representing the dissolution of the Austro-Hungarian Empire at the end of World War I. Also depicted are scenes of the Holocaust, the rise of Nazi Germany, and the rape of Hungarian women by invading Soviet soldiers during World War II. There is a biographical reference, picturing the Soviet T34 tank which wounded Penczner in a battle near Cegled.The figure of a one-legged man symbolizes all soldiers who fought in wars. Included are flags of Allied and Axis powers who participated in the war. A self-portrait image is seen in the center, representing a signature to the work. A prominent theme is the Hungarian Revolution of 1956. In the lower right, we see a commemoration of Pesti Srac (Hungarian colloquialism meaning "Boys of Budapest"). This represents the young men who fought against the Soviet invasion of Hungary. Also represented is one of the Soviet tanks.

=== Jesus and the Twelve Apostles ===
Penczner created a series of drawings depicting Jesus and the twelve Apostles. This work was accepted by Pope John Paul II for the Vatican in Rome.

=== Portraiture ===
Over his career, Penczner has been commissioned to paint portraits of Virginia Churchill (niece of Winston Churchill), Mayor Wyeth Chandler, Jack Howard, President of United Press International, and a number of mid-south dignitaries. Pictured on the right is a portrait of the late Carol Gage, long-time friend and native Memphian.
