= Nancy Denson =

American politician

Mayor of Athens-Clarke County, Georgia
- In office January 4, 2011 – January 8, 2019
- Preceded by: Heidi Davison
- Succeeded by: Kelly Girtz

Tax Commissioner of Clarke County
- In office 1985–2010

Athens City Council Member
- In office 1980–1985

Personal details
- Born: Memphis, Tennessee, U.S.
- Party: Democratic
- Spouse: Bob Denson
- Children: 1 son, 3 daughters (including Margaret Kaiser)
- Education: University of Georgia (BBA)
- Occupation: Politician
- Website: Official website

Nancy Denson is an American politician who served as mayor of U.S. city of Athens, Georgia, from 2011 to 2019. First elected mayor in 2010 and re-elected in 2014, Denson has been in public service since 1980 starting as an Athens City Council member.

== Background ==
Nancy Denson was born in Memphis, Tennessee. She was the third of seven children. She married Bob Denson and moved to Athens in 1966. She attended the University of Georgia where she obtained a BBA degree. She also earned a certificate in public management from the Carl Vinson Institute of Government, also part of UGA.

== Political career ==
=== Athens City Council member ===
Denson was elected as a council member for the Athens City Council in 1980, becoming the first woman to hold this position. She served as the president of the 10th District and was a member of all council committees.

=== Mayor ===
The nonpartisan 2010 General Election was held on November 2, 2010, and Nancy Denson beat both 20-year-old UGA student Glenn Stegall and former mayor of Athens Gwen O'Looney to be elected mayor of Athens-Clarke County. On May 22, 2018, county commissioner Kelly Girtz was elected to replace Denson as mayor of Athens-Clarke County. Denson was ineligible to seek a third term due to term limits.

Athens-Clarke County mayoral election, 2010
Candidate	Votes	%
Nancy Denson	8,929	34.0
Gwen O'Looney	6,091	23.2
Spencer Frye	5,498	21.0
Charlie M. Maddox	4,741	18.1
Glenn Stegall	967	3.7
Source: Athens-Clarke County Board of Elections

== Personal life ==
Her daughter Margaret Kaiser was a member of the Georgia House of Representatives.

== See also ==
- List of people from Memphis, Tennessee
- List of University of Georgia people
- Timeline of Athens, Georgia

Political offices
Preceded by Heidi Davison	Mayor of Athens-Clarke County; 2011–2019	Succeeded by Kelly Girtz
