= Heidi Davison =

American mayor

Honorable Heidi Davison

Mayor of Athens, Georgia
- In office January 7, 2003 – January 4, 2011
- Preceded by: Doc Eldridge
- Succeeded by: Nancy Denson

Personal details
- Party: Democratic
- Spouse: Al Davison
- Education: University of Georgia
- Profession: Educator
- Website: www.athensclarkecounty.com/commission/

Heidi Davison is an American politician from Georgia, U.S., and is the former mayor of Athens, Georgia. She is a member of the Democratic Party.

== Background ==
Davison attended the University of Georgia and received a B.S.Ed in Elementary Education and M.Ed in Middle School Education. Before becoming mayor, Mrs. Davison worked as an Elementary and Middle School Language Arts teacher from 1975 till 1989. She then worked as manager of Alan Campbell Studios, an art studio and gallery in Athens, Georgia, from 1992 until 1998. From 1999 until 2001, she was the Project Direct of the Senior Leadership Academy, and Athens Area Council on Aging. Davison served as the Director of Leadership Athens from 1996 until 2001, and a Leadership Development Associate for the J.W. Fanning Institute for Leadership from 1999 till 2002.

== Political career ==
Davison served as the Unification Commission Executive Secretary, in the Solid Waste Advisory Committee, on the SPLOST '94 Citizen's Panel, the SPLOST Advisory Committee, as well as managing and volunteering for several local, state and national political campaigns. Additionally, she was a School Board candidate in 1993.

== Mayor ==
In 2002, Davison was elected to a 4-year term as Mayor of Athens, Georgia. As mayor, Davison pushed for stronger natural resource protection, more public safety officers, stronger neighborhood protection, and citizen participation.

Davison was elected to a second term in 2006. On January 2, 2007, Mayor Davison was sworn in for her second term as the Mayor or Athens.

As mayor, Davison presided over the largest increase in overall poverty rates in Athens history.

Mayor Davison was term-limited under the Unified Government's charter, and therefore prohibited from running for reelection in 2010. When her term expired on January 4, 2011, she was succeeded by Nancy Denson, the former Clarke County Tax Commissioner.

== Personal life ==
Heidi Davison is married to Al Davison.

== Electoral history ==
Mayor of Athens Democratic Primary, 2002 Threshold > 50%

First Ballot, August 20, 2002

Candidate	Affiliation	Support	Outcome
Heidi Davison	Democrat	≈45%	Runoff
Doc Eldridge	Democrat	≈41%	Runoff
Richard DeRose	Democrat	≈10%	Defeated
Eric Krasle	Democrat	≈4%	Defeated
Others	n/a	1%	Defeated

Second Ballot, September 10, 2002

Candidate	Affiliation	Support	Outcome
Heidi Davison	Democrat	57%	Elected
Doc Eldridge	Democrat	43%	Defeated

Mayor of Athens, 2002

Threshold > 50%

First Ballot, November 5, 2002

Candidate	Affiliation	Support	Outcome
Heidi Davison	Democrat	100%	Elected

Mayor of Athens, 2006

Threshold > 50%

First Ballot, November 8, 2006

Candidate	Affiliation	Support	Outcome
Heidi Davison	Democrat	≈48%	Runoff
Charlie M. Maddox	Unavailable	≈30%	Runoff
Tom Chasteen	Unavailable	≈24%	Defeated
Richard DeRose	Democrat	≈1%	Defeated
Others	n/a	1%	Defeated

Second Ballot, December 5, 2006

Candidate	Affiliation	Support	Outcome
Heidi Davison	Democrat	55%	Elected
Charlie M. Maddox	Unavailable	45%	Defeated
