= Kelly Girtz =

American politician

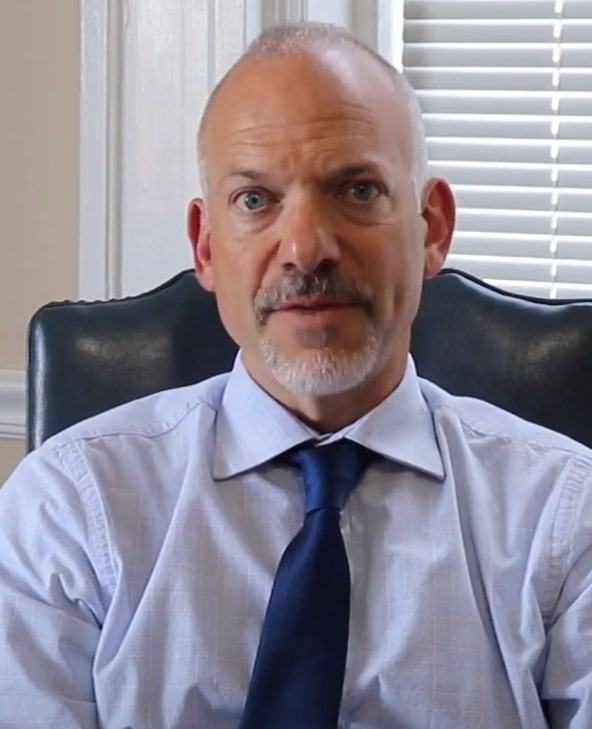

Mayor of Athens-Clarke County, Georgia
- Incumbent
- Assumed office January 8, 2019
- Preceded by: Nancy Denson

District 9 Commissioner for Athens-Clarke County
- In office 2007–2019

Personal details
- Born: Kelly Darryl Girtz; November 12, 1971 (age 54) Bath, Maine, U.S.
- Party: Democratic
- Spouse: Andrea Griffith-Girtz
- Children: 1
- Education: Old Dominion University (BS); Piedmont College (MAT)
- Occupation: Politician, educator

Kelly Darryl Girtz (born November 12, 1971) is an American educator and politician currently serving as mayor of the unified government of Athens-Clarke County, Georgia, having succeeded Nancy Denson in January 2019. Before he was sworn in as mayor, Girtz maintained a long career as a teacher and school administrator in Northeast Georgia.

== Early life ==
Girtz was born on November 12, 1971, in Bath, Maine to Darryl Sylvester and Joanne (née Kirsch) Girtz (now Claridge), while his father was stationed aboard the USS Dale. The Dale was homeported in Newport, Rhode Island, where Girtz and his family then lived for a year before moving to Oakland, California for a year. From 1974 to 1994, he was raised and resided in Norfolk, Virginia, where he graduated from Lake Taylor High School in 1989. He earned a Bachelor of Science degree from Old Dominion University in 1993.

== Educator ==
Girtz earned his Master of Arts in Teaching from Piedmont College. From 1998 to 2014, he was a teacher and administrator in the Clarke County School District in Athens. He then served as Regional Director for Student Services and Special Education for Foothills Charter High School, a public charter high school.

== Political career ==
=== County commissioner ===
In November 2006, Girtz was elected to serve as a member of the Athens-Clarke County commission, representing District 9. He was re-elected unopposed in both 2010 and 2014.

=== Mayoral candidate ===
In May 2017, Girtz announced that he would run for mayor of Athens-Clarke County. On May 22, 2018, he defeated fellow commissioner Harry Sims and local businessman Richie Knight, earning over 60 percent of the vote, to become mayor-elect.

=== Mayor ===
Girtz was sworn in as Mayor on January 8, 2019. Former Clarke County School District Board of Education member Ovita Thornton was sworn in as Girtz's replacement for the District 9 commissioner seat. During the 2020 COVID-19 pandemic in the United States, Girtz urged Athens residents to continue sheltering in place, opposing Governor Brian Kemp's April 20 announcement that non-essential Georgia businesses, like gyms and hair salons, could re-open that week.

During the Black Lives Matter protests of late May/early June 2020, Mayor Girtz joined protesters in calling for the removal of a Confederate monument on Broad Street. The demand came after local law enforcement teargassed protesters at a March for a World Without Cops demonstration in front of the University of Georgia Arch on the night of May 31.

Girtz was re-elected in May 2022 with around 60 percent of the vote.

== Electoral history ==
=== 2006 ===
Athens-Clarke County Commission, District 9 general election results, 2006
| Candidate | Votes | % |
|---|---|---|
| Kelly Girtz | 3,185 | 42.02% |
| Chuck Jones | 784 | 10.34% |
| Alvin Sheats | 2,736 | 36.10% |
| Ed Vaughan | 874 | 11.53% |

Athens-Clarke County Commissioner, District 9 runoff election results, 2006
| Candidate | Votes | % |
|---|---|---|
| Kelly Girtz | 2,636 | 58.89% |
| Alvin Sheats | 1,840 | 41.11% |

=== 2018 ===
Athens-Clarke County Mayor, election results, 2018
| Candidate | Votes | % |
|---|---|---|
| Kelly Girtz | 10,924 | 60.20% |
| Richie Knight | 1,664 | 9.17% |
| Harry L. Sims | 5,499 | 30.31% |
| Write-In | 58 | 0.32% |

=== 2022 ===
Athens-Clarke County Mayor, election results, 2022
| Candidate | Votes | % |
|---|---|---|
| Kelly Girtz | 12,969 | 59.54% |
| Mara Zuniga | 5,422 | 24.84% |
| Pearl Hall | 1,092 | 5.01% |
| Mykeisha Ross | 1,034 | 4.75% |
| Fred Moorman | 659 | 3.03% |
| Bennie Coleman III | 607 | 2.79% |

Political offices
| Preceded by Nancy Denson | Mayor of Athens-Clarke County; 2019–present | Incumbent |
