= LaNell Williams =

American physicist and virologist

- Born: January 1, 1993 (age 33); Memphis, Tennessee
- Other name: LaNell Alexandria Williams LaNell Threatt-Williams
- Education: Fisk University; Wesleyan University; Harvard University
- Known for: Founder of Women+ of Color Project; LaNell Williams Day
- Awards: National Science Foundation Graduate Research Fellow Program (2016)
- Scientific career
- Doctoral advisor: Vinothan N. Manoharan

LaNell Williams (born January 1, 1993) is an American physicist and virologist. She is the third African American woman to receive a PhD in physics from Harvard University. She founded the Women+ of Color Project, which helps women of color gain the resources to apply to graduate programs as well as giving advice about life as a graduate student. Her research focuses on the self assembly of the virus, bacteriophage MS2.

== Early life and education ==
Williams was born in Memphis, Tennessee. She attended high school at City University School of Liberal Arts, graduating in 2011. She completed a bachelor's degree in physics at Wesleyan University in 2015. Williams was awarded a NSF-GRFP in 2016 to fund her graduate research at an accredited U.S. institution. She joined the Fisk-Vanderbilt Master's to PhD Bridge Program where she was a dual student at Fisk University and Vanderbilt University. She earned a Master's degree at Fisk University in 2017. Williams continued on to become the third African American woman to graduate with a Physics PhD in 2023 from Harvard University where she studied under Professor Vinothan N. Manoharan.

== Career ==
She currently works on understanding the life cycle of viruses from the physics perspective in the Manoharan Lab at Harvard University. Her research is on the self assembly of the bacteriophage MS2 virus where she focuses on why these systems are able to survive without external interactions by looking at multiple ways a virus can assemble itself; her research falls under soft condensed matter physics.

=== Science advocacy ===
Williams founded the Women+ of Color Project (W+OCP) in 2019 to improve diversity in the graduate application process for under-represented racial minority women and nonbinary individuals. This project was created to help women of color learn and share experiences about applying and surviving in graduate school. In the first year, the program had 20 participants and in 2020 there were 50 active participants who met virtually due to the COVID-19 pandemic. This program allowed African American, Latinx, and Native American individuals to learn about the graduate school application and admission process to improve the applicant pool for under-represented racial minority women and nonbinary groups. She continued her activism work by being a co-organizer in #BlackinPhysics week in 2020, which highlighted and celebrated Black physicists. Starting January 2021, Williams serves on the American Physical Society's Board of Directors.

== Honors ==
In 2011, to recognize her academic excellence and achievements within the community, she was presented with a Resolution that dubbed August 16 'LaNell Williams Day' in Memphis. This day acknowledged her work within the Memphis community as a volunteer for multiple organizations from Children's Museum of Memphis to Books to Birth; it also recognized her academic awards and honors which included the Academic All-Star Award from Cellular South to receiving the Sam Walton Scholarship, and being a member of the National Honors Society.
