= 2025 New York City Democratic mayoral primary =

- June 24, 2025
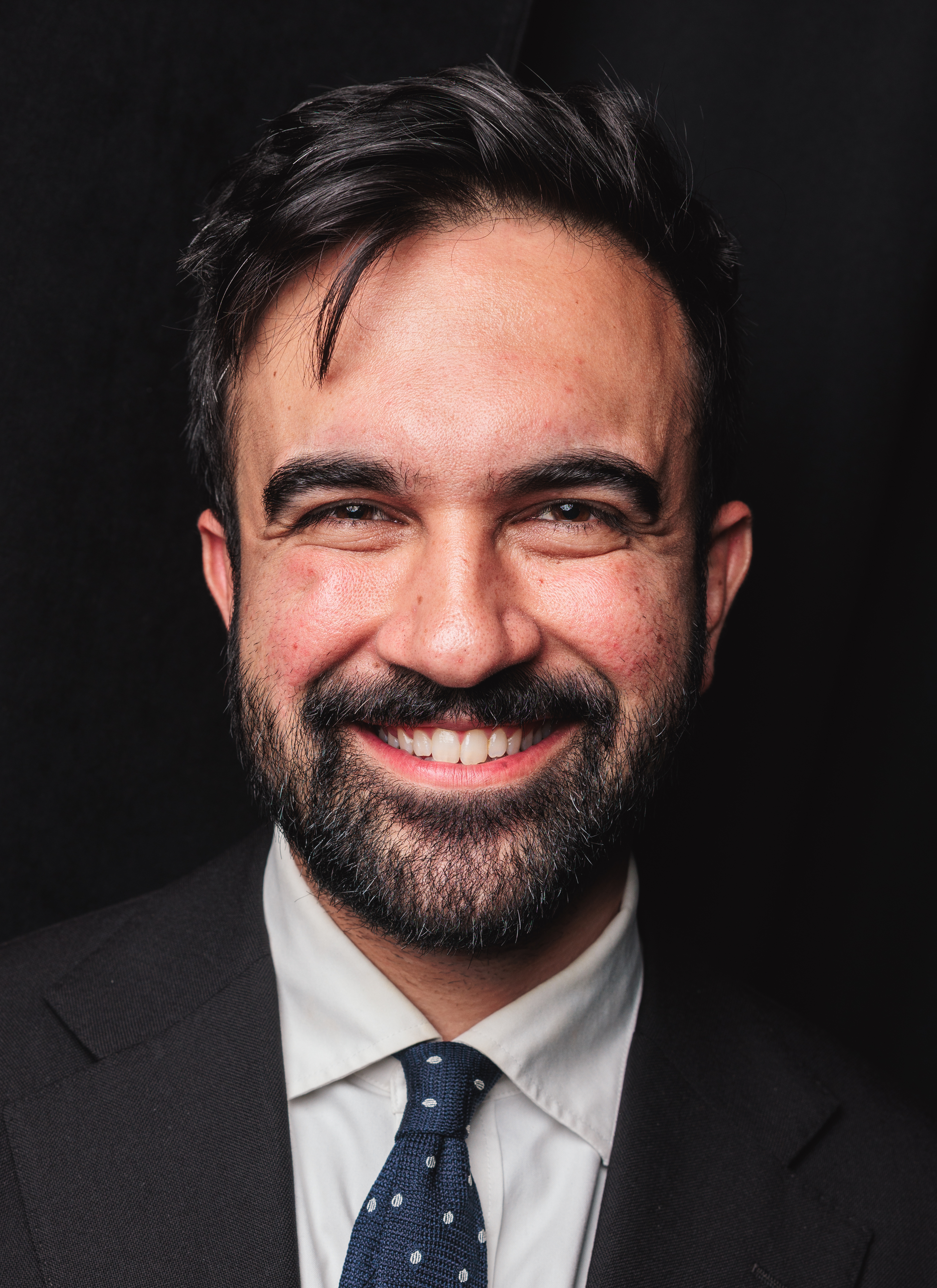

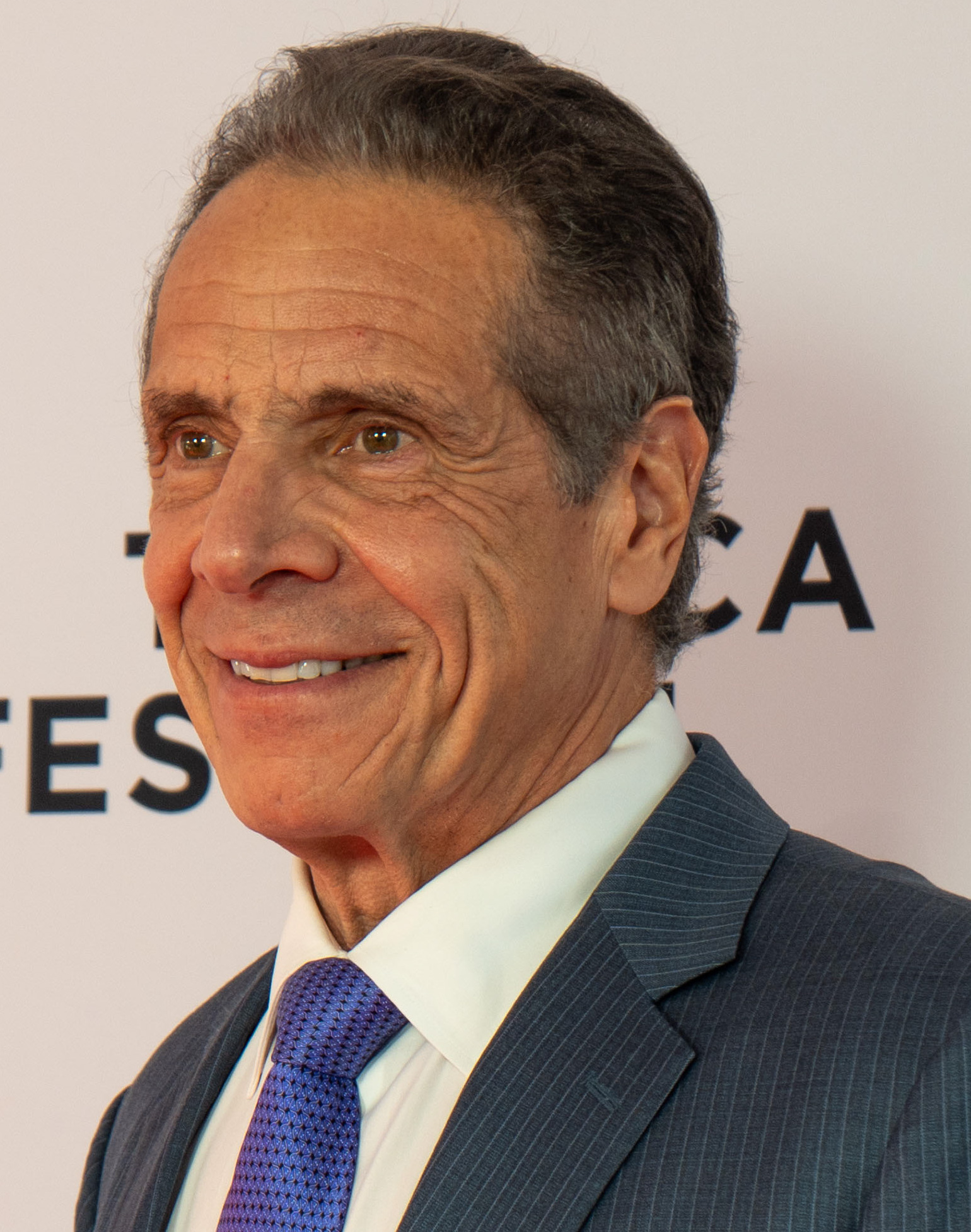

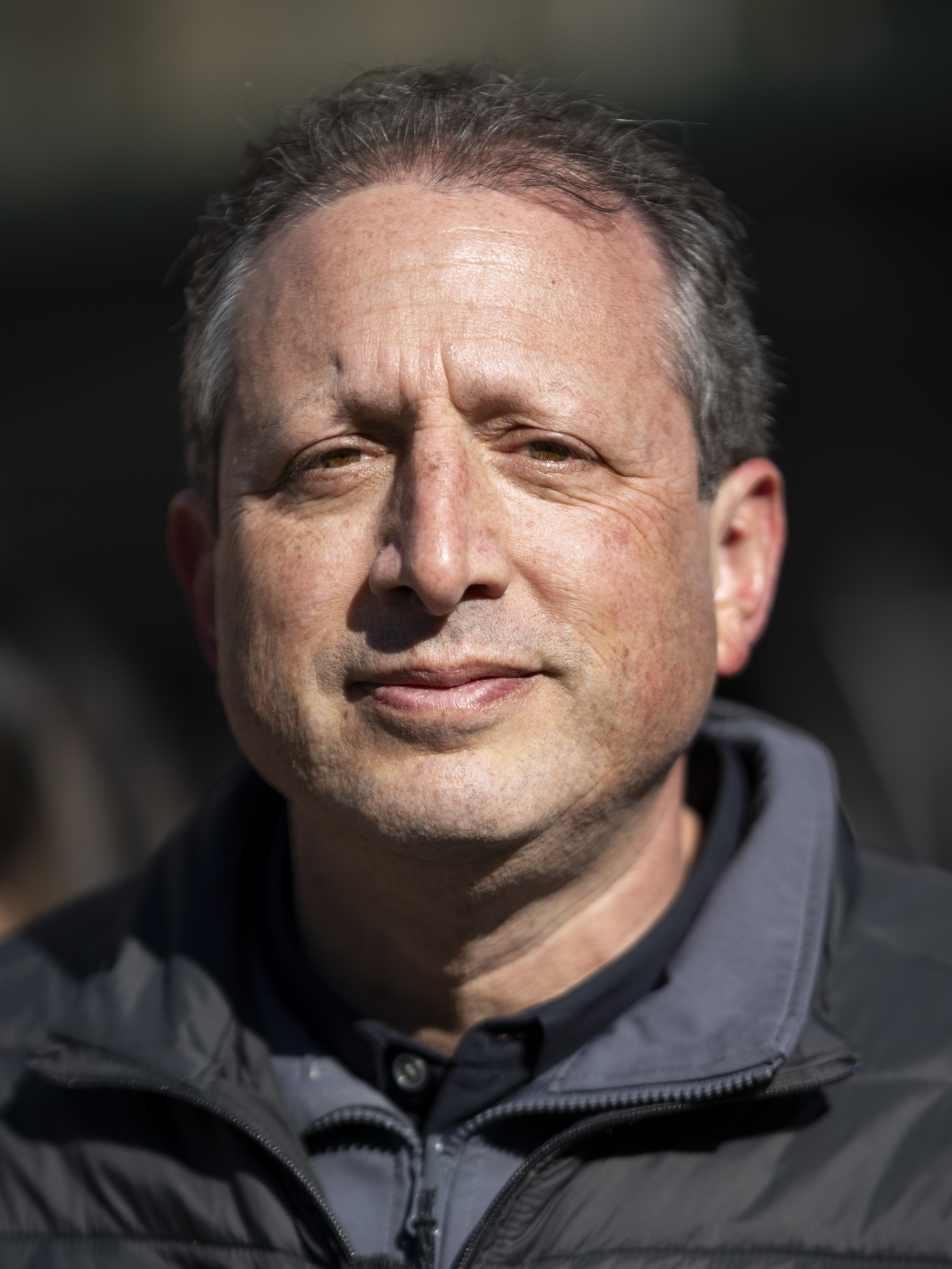
Candidate	Zohran Mamdani	Andrew Cuomo	Brad Lander
First round	469,642; 43.82%	387,137; 36.12%	120,627; 11.26%
Final round	573,169; 56.39%	443,229; 43.61%	Eliminated
Mamdani
30–40%
40–50%
50–60%
60–70%
70–80%
Cuomo
30–40%
40–50%
50–60%
60–70%
70–80%
Mamdani
30–40%
40–50%
50–60%
60–70%
70–80%
Cuomo
30–40%
40–50%
50–60%
60–70%
70–80%
Mamdani
20–30%
30–40%
40–50%
50–60%
60–70%
70–80%
80–90%
>90%
Cuomo
20–30%
30–40%
40–50%
50–60%
60–70%
70–80%
80–90%
>90%
Lander
30–40%
40–50%
60–70%
>90%
Tie
20-30%
30–40%
40–50%
50%
Mamdani
50–60%
60–70%
70–80%
80–90%
>90%
Cuomo
50–60%
60–70%
70–80%
80–90%
>90%
Tie
30–40%
40–50%
50%
Previous Democratic nominee
Eric Adams
Democratic nominee
Zohran Mamdani

The Democratic Party primary for the 2025 New York City mayoral election took place on June 24, 2025. Voters ranked up to five candidates using ranked-choice voting. The early voting period began on June 14. Incumbent mayor Eric Adams did not run in the primary, instead choosing to compete for re-election as an independent in the general contest, though he later dropped out.

First-choice results on election night showed assemblymember Zohran Mamdani had a large lead ahead of former governor Andrew Cuomo. Cuomo conceded the race to Mamdani in what was considered to be a major upset victory. In July, ranked-choice results showed Mamdani to be the clear winner with 56.4% of the vote, making him the official Democratic nominee in the November 4, 2025, general election, with Cuomo securing the remaining 43.6% of the vote. The primary was the largest in New York City's history, almost reaching the same turnout as the 2021 mayoral general election.

== Background ==
In 2019, New York City voters passed Ballot Question #1 to amend the City Charter to allow for voters the choice of ranking up to five candidates in primary and special elections for mayor, public advocate, comptroller, borough president, and city council, starting in January 2021. This primary was the second time ranked-choice voting was used in the New York City mayoral primary, following its use during the 2021 New York City Democratic mayoral primary.

In the previous primary on June 22, 2021, then-Brooklyn borough president Eric Adams was narrowly selected as the nominee with 50.4% of the runoff vote, appealing to the political center, over second-placed former New York City Department of Sanitation Commissioner Kathryn Garcia, campaigning as a technocratic problem-solver, who won 49.6%. Adams won the general election for the mayoralty on November 2, 2021 with 66.9% of the vote versus Curtis Sliwa, the Republican challenger. City-wide elections in New York City are solidly Democratic, meaning the Democratic nominee chosen in the primary is likely to win the general election.

== Candidates ==
=== Major candidates ===
The candidates in this section have held elected office or have received substantial media coverage.

Democratic primary candidates
Candidate	Experience	Announced	Ref
Adrienne Adams	Speaker of the New York City Council (2022–2025); City councilmember from the 28th district (2017–2025)	March 5, 2025; Website	
Michael Blake	NY assemblymember from the 79th district (2015–2021); Vice Chair of the Democratic National Committee (2017–2021); Candidate for Public Advocate in 2019; Candidate for NY-15 in 2020	November 24, 2024; Website	
Andrew Cuomo	Governor of New York (2011–2021); Attorney General of New York (2007–2010); U.S. Secretary of Housing and Urban Development (1997–2001)	March 1, 2025; Website	
Brad Lander	New York City Comptroller (2022–2025); City councilmember from the 39th district (2010–2021)	July 30, 2024; Website	
Zohran Mamdani	NY assemblymember from the 36th district (2021–2025)	October 22, 2024; Website	
Zellnor Myrie	NY State Senator from the 20th district (2019–present)	May 8, 2024; Website	
Jessica Ramos	NY State Senator from the 13th district (2019–present)	September 13, 2024; Website	
Scott Stringer	New York City Comptroller (2014–2021); Manhattan Borough President (2006–2013); NY assemblymember from the 67th district (1993–2005); Candidate for mayor in 2021	January 18, 2024; Website	
Whitney Tilson	Investor; Hedge fund manager	November 26, 2024; Website	

=== Other declared candidates ===
- Selma Bartholomew, educator
- Paperboy Prince, artist and perennial candidate

=== Withdrawn ===
- Eric Adams, incumbent mayor (ran as an independent)

=== Declined ===
- Jennifer Jones Austin, lawyer and nonprofit CEO
- Jamaal Bowman, former U.S. Representative from New York's 16th congressional district (2021–2025) (endorsed Mamdani)
- Justin Brannan, city councilmember from the 47th district (2018–2025) (running for comptroller)
- Kathryn Garcia, New York State Director of Operations (2021–2026), former Commissioner of the New York City Department of Sanitation (2014–2020), and candidate for mayor in 2021
- Dan Goldman, U.S. Representative from New York's 10th congressional district (2023–present) (endorsed Myrie)
- Letitia James, Attorney General of New York (2019–present) and former New York City Public Advocate (2014–2018) (running for re-election, co-endorsed Adrienne Adams, Lander, Mamdani, and Myrie)
- Mark Levine, Manhattan Borough President (2022–2025) (running for comptroller) (endorsed Mamdani post-primary)
- Yuh-Line Niou, former state assemblymember from the 65th district (2017–2022) and candidate for New York's 10th congressional district in 2022 (endorsed Mamdani)
- Antonio Reynoso, Brooklyn Borough President (2022–present) (running for re-election, co-endorsed Adrienne Adams, Lander, and Mamdani)
- Jumaane Williams, New York City Public Advocate (2019–present), candidate for lieutenant governor in 2018, and candidate for governor in 2022 (running for re-election, co-endorsed Adrienne Adams, Lander, and Mamdani)

== Campaign ==
=== Early campaigning ===
Incumbent mayor Eric Adams had long been suspected as being likely to draw a primary challenge in the 2025 mayoral primary, with a number of progressive groups, smarting over their defeat to the moderate Adams in the 2021 New York City Democratic mayoral primary, organising to try and recruit a primary challenger to him. These efforts were however complicated by the lack of a clear candidate for progressives to rally behind; Politico reported that high-profile U.S. Representatives Jamaal Bowman and Alexandria Ocasio-Cortez were both uninterested, as was Brooklyn Borough President Antonio Reynoso. With a lack of interest from their highest profile standard-bearers, progressive groups turned to lower-profile challengers, with state senators Zellnor Myrie and Jessica Ramos expressing interest in a run, and state assemblymembers Zohran Mamdani and Jessica González-Rojas also being touted as potential contenders.

Adams and his advisers were dismissive of these primary challengers, having raised a large amount of money and secured the support of prominent labor unions, he planned to base his re-election campaign around the reduction in New York City's crime rates since he had taken office in 2021. However, by December 2023 his approval rating had plummeted to 28% following a federal corruption investigation into allegations of his 2021 campaign colluding with the government of Turkey to raise funds. Adams had also endured bruising fights with the New York City Council over the city's budget, and had been criticised for his handling of homelessness and the influx of migrants into the city. The outer borough coalition of African-Americans, Latinos and ethnic whites that had propelled Adams to his 2021 victory had begun to fracture, with only black voters still registering positive approval towards him.

By September of 2024, a number of candidates had announced their intent to primary Adams. State senators Myrie and Ramos both announced their campaigns but suffered from low name recognition, with The New York Times noting that Ramos in particular had only a short window to establish a campaigning apparatus. Former New York City Comptroller Scott Stringer also announced a campaign; Stringer had been a frontrunner in the 2021 mayoral race before his campaign imploded following sexual harassment allegations. Having run as a progressive in 2021, Stringer tacked to the center in 2025 and attempted to garner support from the real estate industry, but had difficulty doing so as many of these donors supported Adams' re-election. The most prominent challenge to Adams at this time was the incumbent New York City Comptroller, Brad Lander, who had been one of Adams' most prominent foes and a reputation as a prominent progressive. Lander had citywide name recognition from his service as Comptroller and a strong base in Brownstone Brooklyn, but The New York Times noted that he had difficulty appealing to non-white voters.

=== Eric Adams' indictment ===
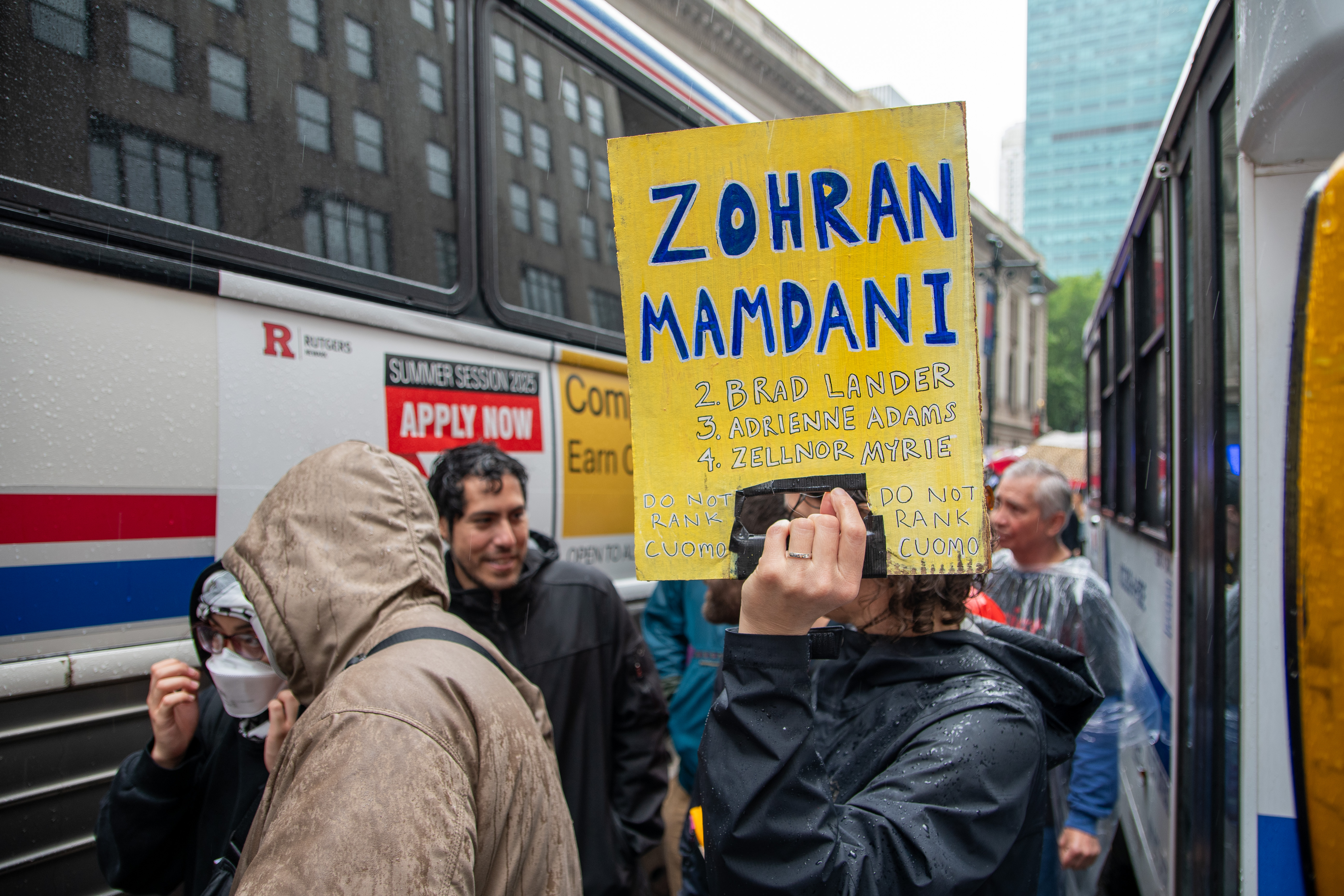
Protester during No Kings protests with sign in support of Zohran Mamdani and other candidates, with text reading "do not rank Cuomo"

The primary campaign received a major shakeup on on the 25th of September, when Eric Adams was federally indicted on charges of wire fraud and bribery with regard to his relationship with the Turkish government. Multiple city officials resigned after the indictment was announced, and while Adams declared that he would continue his campaign his indictment opened up the field for several additional challengers. These included investor Whitney Tilson, former state assemblyman Michael Blake, and state asssemblyman Zohran Mamdani. City Council Speaker Adrienne Adams also announced her campaign on the 5th of March.

The most prominent of the newly announced candidates was however former Governor of New York Andrew Cuomo. Cuomo had been plotting a political comeback ever since being forced to resign as Governor several years earlier over a sexual harassment scandal, but had previously viewed Adams' strength with black voters as precluding a mayoral run. With the incumbent now weakened, he began to organise a campaign, immediately becoming the prohibitive front-runner due to his strong name recognition from years spent as Governor. Running as a staunch moderate, Cuomo faced significant backlash over his sexual harassment allegations, and was targeted by the 'Don't Rank Evil Andrew for Mayor' (DREAM) campaign, which urged voters to not include him on their ranked-choice ballots, and instead rank Cuomo's opposition to maximise the chances of him losing.

In April, Eric Adams withdrew from the Democratic primary race and announced that he would continue to seek re-election as an independent candidate. That same month, criminal charges against Eric Adams were dismissed at the request of the Department of Justice, which argued that the case distracted him from enforcing President Trump's immigration program.

Mamdani's campaign focused on affordability, proposing a rent freeze, increased public housing construction, free buses, universal childcare, and tax increases for those earning above $1 million annually. Cuomo's campaign focused on crime, supporting an increase in police and building housing. Lander's campaign supported building housing, services to immigrants, and investment in education. Adrienne Adams' campaign supported closing Rikers Island and investment in housing and education. Stringer's campaign supported recruiting more police and ethics reform. Myrie's campaign supported building more housing. Blake's campaign supported tax incentives for businesses and funding mental services. Ramos's campaign supported improving mental health services. Tilson's campaign largely focused on education.

=== Cuomo vs Mamdani ===
Throughout the race, Cuomo consistently led in polls, with Mamdani emerging in second place. In May, in response to a request from Republican members of Congress, the Justice Department opened an investigation into Cuomo's testimony before Congress regarding the COVID-19 pandemic in New York. The polling margin between Cuomo and Mamdani began to shrink in June, though most polls continued to show a Cuomo lead. Cuomo created the "Fight and Deliver" party, which he planned to run on regardless of the outcome of the primary. The Working Families Party said it was very unlikely to endorse Cuomo if he won.

The first debate was held on June 4, where Cuomo was pressed on his sexual harassment allegations and the frontrunners shared their stances on Israel. The second and final debate was held on June 12, where Cuomo was again criticized for his record, with increased attention to his administration's nursing home scandal, and Mamdani was criticized for inexperience and his identity as a socialist.

Prominent endorsements for Mamdani included the Working Families Party, Representative Alexandria Ocasio-Cortez, and Senator Bernie Sanders. Cuomo received endorsements from former mayor Michael Bloomberg, who also donated millions of dollars to his super PAC, Representative Jim Clyburn, and former President Bill Clinton. On June 6, Ramos endorsed Cuomo while remaining on the primary ballot. During the second debate, Tilson endorsed Cuomo second. Mamdani and Lander cross-endorsed each other for second place, and Mamdani and Blake cross-endorsed each other a few days later. On June 16, The New York Times editorial board advised voters not to rank Mamdani while criticizing Cuomo.

On June 18, Mamdani was criticized for appearing to defend the phrase "globalize the intifada" by describing it as "a desperate desire for equality and equal rights in standing up for Palestinian human rights", also denouncing antisemitism and saying the city should increase anti-hate crime funding. On June 19, Lander was briefly detained by Immigration and Customs Enforcement while escorting an immigrant out of a court hearing in Manhattan.

On June 20, Mamdani walked the length of Manhattan for seven hours, meeting supporters along the way. At the same time at Astor Place, Mamdani campaign volunteers organized a free merchandise screen printing event for supporters. Mamdani's campaign merchandise and materials used bright colors that stood out from the traditional red, white, and blue designs common in New York City political campaigns; this visual style was created by Philadelphia-based graphic designer Aneesh Bhoopathy and was inspired by the bold colors used by local businesses such as bodegas, taxis, and street vendors. By the end of the campaign, over 10,000 volunteers for Mamdani canvassed over 1 million doors in the city, largely coordinated with the New York City chapter of Democratic Socialists of America, of which he belonged.

== Endorsements ==
Adrienne Adams

U.S. representatives

- Yvette Clarke, U.S. representative from New York's 9th congressional district (2007–present)
- Jasmine Crockett, U.S. representative from Texas's 30th congressional district (2023–present)
- Alexandria Ocasio-Cortez, U.S. representative from New York's 14th congressional district (2019–present) (second choice)
- Nydia Velázquez, U.S. representative from New York's 7th congressional district (1993–present) (second choice)

Statewide officials

- Letitia James, Attorney General of New York (2019–present) (first choice)

State legislators

- George Alvarez, state assemblymember from the 78th district (2023–present) (third choice)
- Khaleel Anderson, state assemblymember from the 31st district (2020–present) (second or third choice co-endorsement with Myrie)
- Monique Chandler-Waterman, state assemblymember from the 58th district (2022–present) (third choice)
- Leroy Comrie, state senator from the 14th district (2015–present) (first choice)
- Brian Cunningham, state assemblymember from the 43rd district (2022–present)
- Emily Gallagher, state assemblymember from the 50th district (2021–present) (third, fourth, or fifth choice co-endorsement with Blake and Myrie, previously co-endorsed Ramos)
- Jessica González-Rojas, state assemblymember from the 34th district (2021–present) (second choice co-endorsement with Myrie)
- Andrew Hevesi, state assemblymember from the 28th district (2005–present)
- Larinda Hooks, state assemblymember from the 35th district (2025–present) (second choice)
- Alicia Hyndman, state assemblymember from the 29th district (2016–present) (second choice)
- Gustavo Rivera, state senator from the 33rd district (2011–present) (third, fourth, or fifth choice co-endorsement with Blake and Myrie, previously co-endorsed Ramos)
- Julia Salazar, state senator from the 18th district (2019–present) (fourth choice)
- James Sanders Jr., state senator from the 10th district (2013–present) (second choice)
- Clyde Vanel, state assemblymember from the 33rd district (2017–present) (second choice)

Local officials

- Alexa Avilés, city councilmember from the 38th district (2022–present) (third choice)
- Diana Ayala, Deputy Speaker of the New York City Council (2022–present) from the 8th district (2018–present)
- Chris Banks, city councilmember from the 42nd district (2024–present)
- Selvena Brooks-Powers, Majority Whip of the New York City Council (2022–present) from the 31st district (2021–present) (second choice)
- Tiffany Cabán, city councilmember from the 22nd district (2021–present) (third choice)
- Carmen De La Rosa, city councilmember from the 10th district (2022–present) (first choice)
- Amanda Farías, Majority Leader of the New York City Council (2024–present) from the 18th district (2022–present)
- Virginia Fields, former Manhattan Borough President (1998–2005)
- Jennifer Gutiérrez, city councilmember from the 34th district (2022–present) (co-endorsement with Lander and Mamdani)
- Crystal Hudson, city councilmember from the 35th district (2022–present) (co-endorsement with Lander, Mamdani, and Myrie)
- Rita Joseph, city councilmember from the 40th district (2022–present) (first choice)
- Daneek Miller, former city councilmember from the 27th district (2014–2021)
- Mercedes Narcisse, city councilmember from the 46th district (2022–present)
- Sandy Nurse, city councilmember from the 37th district (2022–present) (co-endorsement with Lander, Mamdani, and Myrie)
- Chi Ossé, city councilmember from the 36th district (2022–present) (second, third, or fourth choice co-endorsement with Lander and Myrie)
- Lincoln Restler, city councilmember from the 33rd district (2022–present) (co-endorsement with Lander and Mamdani)
- Antonio Reynoso, Brooklyn Borough President (2022–present) (second choice co-endorsement with Mamdani)
- Kevin Riley, city councilmember from the 12th district (2021–present) (first choice)
- Helen Rosenthal, former city councilmember from the 6th district (2014-2022)
- Yusef Salaam, city councilmember from the 9th district (2024–present)
- Althea Stevens, city councilmember from the 16th district (2022–present)
- Jumaane Williams, New York City Public Advocate (2019–present) (first or second choice co-endorsement with Lander)
- Nantasha Williams, city councilmember from the 27th district (2021–present) (first choice)

Individuals

- Ana Maria Archila, activist and co-director of the New York Working Families Party (third choice)
- Yaacov Behrman, rabbi and activist (third choice)
- Yosef Braun, rabbi (third choice)
- Dante de Blasio, son of former mayor Bill de Blasio (first choice)
- Shawn Fain, president of United Auto Workers (2023–present) (fourth choice, previously endorsed as fifth choice)
- Ilana Glazer, comedian (fourth choice)
- Devorah Halberstam, gun control activist and co-founder of the Jewish Children's Museum (third choice)
- Shea Hecht, rabbi and radio broadcaster (third choice)
- Sarah McNally, owner of McNally Jackson Books (third choice)
- Cynthia Nixon, actor and candidate for governor of New York in 2018 (third choice)
- Lynn Nottage, playwright (third choice)
- AnnaSophia Robb, actress (third choice)
- Dominique Sharpton, daughter of Al Sharpton
- Shaina Taub, actress and musician (second choice)
- Maya Wiley, president and CEO of the Leadership Conference on Civil and Human Rights and candidate for mayor in 2021 (second choice)

Labor unions

- Communications Workers of America Local 1180
- District Council 37 (first choice)
- Doctors Council Service Employees International Union (co-endorsement with Lander, Mamdani, Myrie, and Ramos)
- Professional Staff Congress (first, second, or third choice co-endorsement with Lander and Mamdani)
- UNITE HERE Local 100 (first choice)
- United Auto Workers Region 9A (fourth choice, previously endorsed as fifth choice)

Organizations

- Brooklyn Young Democrats (fourth choice)
- Citizen Action of New York (co-endorsement with Blake, Lander, Mamdani, and Myrie, previously co-endorsed Ramos)
- Emgage Action (third choice)
- Jews for Racial and Economic Justice (third choice)
- Make the Road Action (second choice co-endorsement with Mamdani)
- Sunrise Movement NYC (second, third, fourth, or fifth choice co-endorsement with Blake, Lander, and Myrie)
- 2 chapters of Stonewall Democrats (Note: First choice endorsements from both the Jim Owles Liberal Democratic Club and the NYC chapters.)
- Working Families Party (third choice)

Newspapers

- Columbia Daily Spectator (third choice)
- New York Daily News (second choice)
- Washington Square News (third choice)
Michael Blake

State legislators

- Khaleel Anderson, state assemblymember from the 31st district (2020–present) (fifth choice, previously endorsed Ramos)
- George Alvarez, state assemblymember from the 78th district (2023–present) (fifth choice)
- Emily Gallagher, state assemblymember from the 50th district (2021–present) (third, fourth, or fifth choice co-endorsement Adrienne Adams and Myrie, previously endorsed Ramos)
- Zohran Mamdani, state assemblymember from the 36th district (2021–present) and mayoral candidate (cross-endorsement)
- Gustavo Rivera, state senator from the 33rd district (2011–present) (third, fourth, or fifth choice co-endorsement with Adrienne Adams and Myrie, previously endorsed Ramos)

Local officials

- Carmen De La Rosa, city councilmember from the 10th district (2022–present) (fifth choice)

Individuals

- Shawn Fain, president of United Auto Workers (2023–present) (fifth choice, previously endorsed Ramos)
- Sarah McNally, owner of McNally Jackson Books (fifth choice)
- Kenice Mobley, comedian (second choice)
- Cynthia Nixon, actor and candidate for governor of New York in 2018 (fifth choice)
- Olayemi Olurin, lawyer and political commentator (fourth choice)
- AnnaSophia Robb, actress (fifth choice)
- Shaina Taub, actress and musician (fifth choice)
- Maya Wiley, president and CEO of the Leadership Conference on Civil and Human Rights and candidate for mayor in 2021 (fifth choice)

Labor Unions

- Professional Staff Congress (fourth or fifth choice co-endorsement with Myrie, previously endorsed Ramos)
- United Auto Workers Region 9A (fifth choice, previously endorsed Ramos)

Organizations

- Brooklyn Young Democrats (fifth choice)
- Citizen Action of New York (co-endorsement with Adrienne Adams, Lander, Mamdani, and Myrie, previously endorsed Ramos)
- Emgage Action (fifth choice)
- Jews for Racial and Economic Justice (fifth choice)
- Sunrise Movement NYC (second, third, fourth, or fifth choice co-endorsement with Adrienne Adams, Lander, and Myrie)
- The People for Bernie Sanders (second or third choice co-endorsement with Lander)

Newspapers

- Washington Square News (fifth choice)
Andrew Cuomo

Executive branch officials

- Bill Clinton, 42nd president of the United States (1993–2001)

U.S. representatives

- Jim Clyburn, U.S. representative from South Carolina's 6th congressional district (1993–present)
- Adriano Espaillat, U.S. representative from New York's 13th congressional district (2017–present)
- George Latimer, U.S. representative from New York's 16th congressional district (2025–present)
- Gregory Meeks, U.S. representative from New York's 5th congressional district (1998–present)
- George Santos, former Republican U.S. representative from New York's 3rd congressional district (2023) and convicted felon (Independent)
- Tom Suozzi, U.S. representative from New York's 3rd congressional district (2017–2023, 2024–present)
- Ritchie Torres, U.S. representative from New York's 15th congressional district (2021–present)

Statewide officials

- Carl McCall, former New York State Comptroller (1993–2002)
- David Paterson, former Governor of New York (2008–2010) (Note: Paterson has also endorsed independent Jim Walden in the general election.)
- Ned Lamont, Governor of Connecticut (2019–present)

State legislators

- Joseph Addabbo Jr., state senator from the 15th district (2009–present)
- George Alvarez, state assemblymember from the 78th district (2023–present) (first choice)
- Stacey Pheffer Amato, state assemblymember from the 23rd district (2017–present)
- ~~Khaleel Anderson, state assemblymember from the 31st district (2020–present) (first choice)~~ (Note: Anderson was part of a coalition of elected officials who endorsed Cuomo as their first choice, but he stated that he did not personally support him.)
- Michael Benedetto, state assemblymember from the 82nd district (2005–present)
- Sam Berger, state assemblymember from the 27th district (2023–present)
- Edward Braunstein, state assemblymember from the 26th district (2011–present)
- Kenny Burgos, former state assemblymember from the 85th district (2020–2024)
- William Colton, state assemblymember from the 47th district (1997–present)
- ~~Leroy Comrie, state senator from the 14th district (2015–present) (first choice)~~ (Note: Comrie was part of a coalition of elected officials who endorsed Cuomo as their first choice, but he stated that he did not personally support him.)
- Vivian Cook, state assemblymember from the 32nd district (1991–present)
- Manny De Los Santos, state assemblymember from the 72nd district (2022–present)
- Erik Dilan, state assemblymember from the 54th district (2015–present)
- Charles Fall, state assemblymember from the 61st district (2019–present)
- Eddie Gibbs, state assemblymember from the 68th district (2022–present)
- Rodneyse Bichotte Hermelyn, state assemblymember from the 42nd district (2015–present)
- Larinda Hooks, state assemblymember from the 35th district (2025–present) (first choice)
- Alicia Hyndman, state assemblymember from the 29th district (2016–present) (first choice)
- Roxanne Persaud, state Senator from the 19th district (2015–present)
- James Sanders Jr., state senator from the 10th district (2013–present) (first choice)
- Jessica Ramos, state senator from the 13th district (2019–present) and mayoral candidate
- Frank Seddio, former state assemblymember from the 59th district (1999–2006)
- Nick Spano, former state senator from the 35th district (1987–2006) (Republican)
- Toby Ann Stavisky, state senator from the 11th district (1999–present)
- Sam Sutton, state senator from the 22nd district (2025–present)
- Yudelka Tapia, state assemblymember from the 86th district (2021–present) (first choice)
- Clyde Vanel, state assemblymember from the 33rd district (2017–present) (first choice)
- Latrice Walker, state assemblymember from the 55th district (2015–present)
- David Weprin, state assemblymember from the 24th district (2010–present)
- Jordan Wright, state assemblymember from the 70th district (2025–present)
- John Zaccaro Jr., state assemblymember from the 80th district (2023–present)

Local officials

- Michael Bloomberg, former Mayor of New York (2002–2013)
- Selvena Brooks-Powers, Majority Whip of the New York City Council (2022–present) from the 31st district (2021–present) (first choice)
- Rubén Díaz Jr., former Bronx Borough President (2009–2021) (previously endorsed Eric Adams)
- Kamillah Hanks, city councilmember from the 49th district (2022–present)
- Farah Louis, city councilmember from the 45th district (2019–present)
- Darlene Mealy, city councilmember from the 41st district (2006–2017, 2022–present)
- Lynn Schulman, city councilmember from the 29th district (2022–present)
- Mike Spano, mayor of Yonkers (2012–present)
- ~~Nantasha Williams, city councilmember from the 27th district (2021–present) (first choice)~~ (Note: Williams was part of a coalition of elected officials who endorsed Cuomo as their first choice, but she stated that she did not personally support him.)
- Susan Zhuang, city councilmember from the 43rd district (2024–present)

Party officials

- Luis Dávila Pernas, chair of the Puerto Rico Democratic Party (2024–present)
- Keith Wright, chair of the Manhattan Democratic Party (2009–present)

Individuals

- Floyd Abrams, lawyer
- Bill Ackman, hedge fund manager (previously endorsed Tilson)
- Marc Anthony, singer-songwriter and actor
- John Avlon, journalist and board chair of Citizens Union (co-endorsement with Lander and Myrie)
- Yaacov Behrman, rabbi and activist (first choice)
- Yosef Braun, rabbi (first choice)
- Tory Burch, fashion designer
- Graydon Carter, journalist (first choice)
- Barry Diller, media executive
- Jeffrey Gural, real estate developer
- Devorah Halberstam, gun control activist and co-founder of the Jewish Children's Museum (first choice)
- Shea Hecht, rabbi and radio broadcaster (first choice)
- Harold Holzer, director of the Roosevelt House Public Policy Institute at Hunter College (first choice)
- Billy Joel, singer-songwriter
- Michael Kors, fashion designer
- Ken Langone, businessman (Republican)
- Marc Lasry, hedge fund manager
- Fern Mallis, fashion executive
- Jane Rosenthal, film producer
- Whitney Tilson, former hedge fund manager and mayoral candidate (second choice) (Note: Tilson endorsed Cuomo as his second choice, but Cuomo did not reciprocate an endorsement.)

Party chapters

- Brooklyn Democratic Party
- Queens Democratic Party
- Staten Island Democratic Party

Labor unions

- 1199SEIU United Healthcare Workers East
- Amalgamated Transit Union
- Hotel and Gaming Trades Council
- International Brotherhood of Electrical Workers Local 3
- International Union of Operating Engineers New York City Coalition (Note: Consists of International Union of Operating Engineers Locals 14-14B, 15, 30, 91, 211, and 891.)
- International Union of Painters and Allied Trades District 9 Council
- LiUNA! New York
- New York State Iron Workers District Council (first choice)
- NYC District Council of Carpenters
- Retail, Wholesale, and Department Store Union
- SEIU 32BJ
- Teamsters Joint Council 16
- Teamsters Local 237
- Uniformed EMS Officers Union Local 3621
- Uniformed EMTs, Paramedics & Inspectors Local 2507
- Uniformed Firefighters Association
- United Food and Commercial Workers Local 1500
- Utility Workers Union of America Local 1-2

Organizations

- Bobov
- Citizens Union (co-endorsement with Lander and Myrie)
- New York League of Conservation Voters (co-endorsement with Lander)

Newspapers

- amNewYork
- New York Daily News (first choice)
- The Jewish Voice (first choice)
- Staten Island Advance
Brad Lander

U.S. representatives

- Greg Casar, U.S. representative from Texas's 35th congressional district (2023–present)
- Pramila Jayapal, U.S. representative from Washington's 7th congressional district (2017–present) (co-endorsement with Mamdani)
- Alexandria Ocasio-Cortez, U.S. representative from New York's 14th congressional district (2019–present) (third choice)
- Nydia Velázquez, U.S. representative from New York's 7th congressional district (1993–present) (third choice)

Statewide officials

- Letitia James, Attorney General of New York (2019–present) (second choice)

State legislators

- Khaleel Anderson, state assemblymember from the 31st district (2020–present) (first choice)
- Robert Carroll, state assemblymember from the 44th district (2017–present) (first choice)
- Monique Chandler-Waterman, state assemblymember from the 58th district (2022–present) (second choice)
- Iwen Chu, former state senator from the 17th district (2023–2024)
- Phara Souffrant Forrest, state assemblymember from the 57th district (2021–present) (second choice)
- Emily Gallagher, state assemblymember from the 50th district (2021–present) (first or second choice co-endorsement with Mamdani)
- Jessica González-Rojas, state assemblymember from the 34th district (2021–present) (first choice co-endorsement with Mamdani)
- Richard Gottfried, former state assemblymember from the 75th district (1971–2022) (first choice)
- Andrew Gounardes, state senator from the 26th district (2019–present) (co-endorsement with Myrie)
- Liz Krueger, state senator from the 28th district (2002–present) (first choice)
- Zohran Mamdani, state assemblymember from the 36th district (2021–present) and mayoral candidate (cross-endorsement, second choice)
- Gustavo Rivera, state senator from the 33rd district (2011–present) (second choice)
- Julia Salazar, state senator from the 18th district (2019–present) (second choice)

Local officials

- Alexa Avilés, city councilmember from the 38th district (2022–present) (second choice)
- Tiffany Cabán, city councilmember from the 22nd district (2021–present) (second choice)
- Carmen De La Rosa, city councilmember from the 10th district (2022–present) (third choice)
- Tom Finkelpearl, former Commissioner of the New York City Department of Cultural Affairs (2014–2019)
- Shahana Hanif, city councilmember from the 39th district (2022–present) (co-endorsement with Mamdani)
- Jennifer Gutiérrez, city councilmember from the 34th district (2022–present) (co-endorsement with Adrienne Adams and Mamdani)
- Crystal Hudson, city councilmember from the 35th district (2022–present) (co-endorsement with Adrienne Adams, Mamdani, and Myrie)
- Sandy Nurse, city councilmember from the 37th district (2022–present) (co-endorsement with Adrienne Adams, Mamdani, and Myrie)
- Chi Ossé, city councilmember from the 36th district (2022–present) (second, third, or fourth choice co-endorsement with Adrienne Adams and Myrie)
- Lincoln Restler, city councilmember from the 33rd district (2022–present) (co-endorsement with Adrienne Adams and Mamdani)
- Antonio Reynoso, Brooklyn Borough President (2022–present) (first choice)
- Jimmy Van Bramer, former Majority Leader of the New York City Council (2014–2017) from the 26th district (2010–2021)
- Jumaane Williams, New York City Public Advocate (2019–present) (first or second choice co-endorsement with Adrienne Adams)

Individuals

- Kurt Andersen, author (first choice)
- Ana Maria Archila, activist and co-director of the New York Working Families Party (second choice)
- John Avlon, journalist and board chair of Citizens Union (co-endorsement with Cuomo and Myrie)
- Will Butler, composer and former member of Arcade Fire
- Dante de Blasio, son of former mayor Bill de Blasio (third choice)
- Shawn Fain, president of United Auto Workers (2023–present) (second choice)
- Ilana Glazer, comedian (first choice)
- Christina Greer, associate professor of political science at Fordham University
- Ezra Klein, journalist
- Fran Lebowitz, author (second choice)
- Sonia Manzano, actress (first choice)
- Bill McKibben, environmentalist (co-endorsement with Mamdani)
- Sarah McNally, owner of McNally Jackson Books (first choice)
- Danny Meyer, restaurateur
- Kenice Mobley, comedian (fourth choice)
- Cynthia Nixon, actor and candidate for governor of New York in 2018 (second choice)
- Lynn Nottage, playwright (second choice)
- Olayemi Olurin, lawyer and political commentator (second choice)
- AnnaSophia Robb, actress (second choice)
- Shaina Taub, actress and musician (first choice)
- Maya Wiley, president and CEO of the Leadership Conference on Civil and Human Rights and candidate for mayor in 2021 (third choice)
- Knowa De Baraso, political commentator and Internet personality

Labor unions

- Committee of Interns and Residents (second choice)
- Doctors Council Service Employees International Union (co-endorsement with Adrienne Adams, Mamdani, Myrie, and Ramos)
- International Alliance of Theatrical Stage Employees Local 161 (second choice co-endorsement with Ramos)
- Professional Staff Congress (first, second, or third choice co-endorsement with Adrienne Adams and Mamdani)
- Teamsters Local 804 (second, third, fourth, or fifth choice co-endorsement with Mamdani)
- UNITE HERE Local 100 (third choice)
- United Auto Workers Region 9A (second choice)
- Workers United New York New Jersey Regional Joint Board (co-endorsement with Mamdani)

Organizations

- Brooklyn Young Democrats (first choice)
- Citizen Action of New York (co-endorsement with Adrienne Adams, Blake, Mamdani, and Myrie, previously co-endorsed Ramos)
- Citizens Union (co-endorsement with Cuomo and Myrie)
- Climate Defiance (second choice)
- College Democrats of America (co-endorsement with Mamdani and Ramos) (Note: Joint endorsement with its New York state affiliate, as well as its Fordham University and New York University chapters.)
- Emgage Action (second choice)
- Indivisible Brooklyn
- Jews for Racial and Economic Justice (first or second choice co-endorsement with Mamdani)
- New York League of Conservation Voters (co-endorsement with Cuomo)
- Make the Road Action (first choice)
- MoveOn (second choice)
- Our Revolution (second choice)
- Progressive Change Campaign Committee (second choice)
- Sunrise Movement NYC (second, third, fourth, or fifth choice co-endorsement with Adrienne Adams, Blake, and Myrie)
- 3 chapters of Stonewall Democrats (Note: First choice endorsement from Lambda Independent Democrats of Brooklyn, second choice endorsement from the NYC chapter, and third choice endorsement from Jim Owles Liberal Democratic Club.)
- The People for Bernie Sanders (second or third choice co-endorsement with Blake)
- Working Families Party (second choice)

Newspapers

- Columbia Daily Spectator (second choice)
- New York Daily News (third choice)
- The Nation (second choice)
- Washington Square News (second choice)
Zohran Mamdani

Executive branch officials

- Robert Reich, former United States Secretary of Labor (1993–1997)

U.S. senators

- Bernie Sanders, U.S. Senator from Vermont (2007–present) (Independent)

U.S. representatives

- Jamaal Bowman, former U.S. representative from New York's 16th congressional district (2021–2025)
- Pramila Jayapal, U.S. representative from Washington's 7th congressional district (2017–present) (co-endorsement with Lander)
- Summer Lee, U.S. representative from Pennsylvania's 12th congressional district (2023–present)
- Alexandria Ocasio-Cortez, U.S. representative from New York's 14th congressional district (2019–present) (first choice)
- Rashida Tlaib, U.S. representative from Michigan's 12th congressional district (2019–present)
- Nydia Velázquez, U.S. representative from New York's 7th congressional district (1993–present) (first choice)

Statewide officials

- Letitia James, Attorney General of New York (2019–present) (third choice)

State legislators

- George Alvarez, state assemblymember from the 78th district (2023–present) (second choice)
- Khaleel Anderson, state assemblymember from the 31st district (2020–present) (fourth choice)
- Michael Blake, former state assemblymember from the 79th district (2015–2021), former vice chair of the Democratic National Committee (2017–2021), and mayoral candidate (cross-endorsement)
- Jabari Brisport, state senator from the 25th district (2021–present)
- Robert Carroll, state assemblymember from the 44th district (2017–present) (second choice)
- Phara Souffrant Forrest, state assemblymember from the 57th district (2021–present) (first choice)
- Emily Gallagher, state assemblymember from the 50th district (2021–present) (first or second choice co-endorsement with Lander)
- Kristen Gonzalez, state senator from the 59th district (2023–present)
- Jessica González-Rojas, state assemblymember from the 34th district (2021–present) (first choice co-endorsement with Lander)
- Richard Gottfried, former state assemblymember from the 75th district (1971–2022) (second choice)
- Robert Jackson, state senator from the 31st district (2019-present)
- John Liu, state senator from the 16th district (2019–present)
- Marcela Mitaynes, state assemblymember from the 51st district (2021–present)
- Steven Raga, state assemblymember from the 30th district (2023–present)
- Aaron Regunberg, former Rhode Island state representative from the 4th district (2015–2019)
- Gustavo Rivera, state senator from the 33rd district (2011–present) (first choice)
- Ruwa Romman, Georgia state representative from the 97th district (2023–present)
- Julia Salazar, state senator from the 18th district (2019–present) (first choice)
- Sarahana Shrestha, state assemblymember from the 103rd district (2023–present)
- Claire Valdez, state assemblymember from the 37th district (2025–present)

Local officials

- Alexa Avilés, city councilmember from the 38th district (2022–present) (first choice)
- Ras Baraka, Mayor of Newark, New Jersey (2014–present)
- Tiffany Cabán, city councilmember from the 22nd district (2021–present) (first choice)
- Carmen De La Rosa, city councilmember from the 10th district (2022–present) (second choice)
- Jennifer Gutiérrez, city councilmember from the 34th district (2022–present) (co-endorsement with Adrienne Adams and Lander)
- Shahana Hanif, city councilmember from the 39th district (2022–present) (co-endorsement with Lander)
- Crystal Hudson, city councilmember from the 35th district (2022–present) (co-endorsement with Adrienne Adams, Lander, and Myrie)
- Brad Lander, New York City Comptroller (2021–present) and mayoral candidate (cross-endorsement, second choice)
- Sandy Nurse, city councilmember from the 37th district (2022–present) (co-endorsement with Adrienne Adams, Lander, and Myrie)
- Chi Ossé, city councilmember from the 36th district (2022–present) (first choice)
- Lincoln Restler, city councilmember from the 33rd district (2022–present) (co-endorsement with Adrienne Adams and Lander)
- Antonio Reynoso, Brooklyn Borough President (2022–present) (second choice co-endorsement with Adrienne Adams)
- Jumaane Williams, New York City Public Advocate (2019–present) (third choice)
- Julie Won, city councilmember from the 26th district (2022–present)

Party officials

- David Hogg, former vice chair of the Democratic National Committee (2025)

International politicians

- Jean-Luc Mélenchon, former deputy for Bouches-du-Rhône's 4th constituency (2017–2022) and candidate for president of France in 2012, 2017, and 2022 (La France Insoumise)
- Jugnu Mohsin, former Punjab Provincial Assemblymember from PP-184 Okara-II (2018–2023) (Pakistan Muslim League (N))
- Yanis Varoufakis, former Minister of Finance of Greece (2015) and Member of the Hellenic Parliament from Thessaloniki A (2015; 2019–2023) (DiEM25)

Individuals

- Kurt Andersen, author (second choice)
- Ana Maria Archila, activist and co-director of the New York Working Families Party (first choice)
- Rowan Blanchard, actress
- Ben Burgis, philosophy professor and socialist political commentator
- Lizzy Caplan, actress
- Julian Casablancas, lead singer of The Strokes
- Ha-Joon Chang, economist and professor
- The hosts of Chapo Trap House
- Sofia Coppola, filmmaker
- Laverne Cox, actress
- Dante de Blasio, son of former mayor Bill de Blasio (second choice)
- Aria Dean, artist and curator
- Steven Donziger, environmental attorney
- John Early, stand-up comedian and actor
- Cole Escola, comedian and actor
- Ella Emhoff, artist, fashion designer, and stepdaughter of Kamala Harris
- Shawn Fain, president of United Auto Workers (2023–present) (first choice)
- Jane Fonda, actress
- James Galbraith, economist and professor
- Jayati Ghosh, development economist and professor
- Ilana Glazer, comedian (second choice)
- Carol Greene, art dealer
- Stavros Halkias, stand-up comedian and podcaster
- Sam Haselby, historian and senior editor of Aeon Magazine
- Mehwish Hayat, actress and pop vocalist
- Poorna Jagannathan, producer and actress
- Swati Khurana, contemporary artist and writer
- The Kid Mero, writer and comedian
- MJ Lenderman, singer-songwriter
- Lorde, singer-songwriter
- Sonia Manzano, actress (second choice)
- Clara Mattei, economist and professor
- Bill McKibben, environmentalist (co-endorsement with Lander)
- Sarah McNally, owner of McNally Jackson Books (second choice)
- Kenice Mobley, comedian (first choice)
- Mira Nair, filmmaker (candidate's mother)
- Hari Nef, actress and model
- Cynthia Nixon, actor and candidate for governor of New York in 2018 (first choice)
- Lynn Nottage, playwright (first choice)
- Olayemi Olurin, lawyer and political commentator (first choice)
- Gabriel Palma, development economist and professor
- Kal Penn, actor and former associate director of the White House Office of Public Engagement and Intergovernmental Affairs (2009–2011)
- Ann Pettifor, economist and co-founder of Jubilee 2000
- Ben Platt, actor and singer
- Kareem Rahma, comedian
- Emily Ratajkowski, model and actress
- AnnaSophia Robb, actress (first choice)
- Maggie Rogers, singer-songwriter
- Alison Roman, chef and writer
- John Samuelsen, International President of Transport Workers Union of America (2017–present)
- Jack Schlossberg, political writer and grandson of President John F. Kennedy
- Ser Serpas, visual artist
- Ali Sethi, singer
- Sarah Sherman, comedian
- Aru Shiney-Ajay, executive director of Sunrise Movement (2023–present)
- Morgan Spector, actor
- Michael Stipe, singer-songwriter and former member of R.E.M.
- Martine Syms, filmmaker and critic
- Shaina Taub, actress and musician (fourth choice)
- Amalia Ulman, film director
- Sunita Viswanath, co-founder of Women for Afghan Women and Hindus for Human Rights
- Isabella Weber, economist and professor
- Maya Wiley, president and CEO of the Leadership Conference on Civil and Human Rights and candidate for mayor in 2021 (first choice)
- Bowen Yang, comedian and actor
- Jaboukie Young-White, comedian

Labor unions

- Committee of Interns and Residents
- District Council 37 (second choice)
- Doctors Council Service Employees International Union (co-endorsement with Adrienne Adams, Lander, Myrie, and Ramos)
- International Alliance of Theatrical Stage Employees Local 161 (first choice)
- Office and Professional Employees International Union Local 153
- Professional Staff Congress (first, second, or third choice co-endorsement with Adrienne Adams and Lander)
- Teamsters Local 804 (second, third, fourth, or fifth choice co-endorsement with Lander)
- UNITE HERE Local 100 (second choice)
- United Auto Workers Region 9A (first choice)
- Workers United New York New Jersey Regional Joint Board (co-endorsement with Lander)

Organizations

- Brooklyn Young Democrats (second choice)
- Citizen Action of New York (co-endorsement with Adrienne Adams, Blake, Lander, and Myrie, previously co-endorsed Ramos)
- Climate Defiance (first choice)
- College Democrats of America (co-endorsement with Lander and Ramos)
- CAIR Action
- Emgage Action (first choice)
- Gen-Z for Change
- Jewish Voice for Peace Action
- Jews for Racial and Economic Justice (first or second choice co-endorsement with Lander)
- Make the Road Action (second choice co-endorsement with Adrienne Adams)
- MoveOn (first choice)
- New York City Democratic Socialists of America
- New York Communities for Change (first choice)
- Our Revolution (first choice)
- Progressive Change Campaign Committee (first choice)
- Sunrise Movement - NYC (first choice) and National chapters
- 3 chapters of Stonewall Democrats (Note: Second choice endorsements from Jim Owles Liberal Democratic Club and Lambda Independent Democrats of Brooklyn, and third choice endorsement from the NYC chapter.)
- The People for Bernie Sanders (first choice)
- Working Families Party (first choice)

Newspapers

- Aftermath
- Columbia Daily Spectator (first choice)
- Red Hook Star-Revue
- The Nation (first choice)
- Washington Square News (first choice)
Zellnor Myrie

U.S. representatives

- Dan Goldman, U.S. representative from New York's 10th congressional district (2023–present)
- Alexandria Ocasio-Cortez, U.S. representative from New York's 14th congressional district (2019–present) (fifth choice)
- Nydia Velázquez, U.S. representative from New York's 7th congressional district (1993–present) (fifth choice)

Statewide officials

- Letitia James, Attorney General of New York (2019–present) (fourth choice)

State legislators

- George Alvarez, state assemblymember from the 78th district (2023–present) (fourth choice)
- Khaleel Anderson, state assemblymember from the 31st district (2020–present) (second or third choice co-endorsement with Adrienne Adams)
- Monique Chandler-Waterman, state assemblymember from the 58th district (2022–present) (first choice)
- Leroy Comrie, state senator from the 14th district (2015–present) (second choice)
- Emily Gallagher, state assemblymember from the 50th district (2021–present) (third, fourth, or fifth choice co-endorsement with Adrienne Adams and Blake, previously co-endorsed Ramos)
- Jessica González-Rojas, state assemblymember from the 34th district (2021–present) (second choice co-endorsement with Adrienne Adams)
- Andrew Gounardes, state senator from the 26th district (2019–present) (co-endorsement with Lander)
- Larinda Hooks, state assemblymember from the 35th district (2025–present) (third choice)
- Alicia Hyndman, state assemblymember from the 29th district (2016–present) (third choice)
- Liz Krueger, state senator from the 28th district (2002–present) (second choice)
- Gustavo Rivera, state senator from the 33rd district (2011–present) (third, fourth, or fifth choice co-endorsement with Adrienne Adams and Blake, previously co-endorsed Ramos)
- Julia Salazar, state senator from the 18th district (2019–present) (third choice)
- James Sanders Jr., state senator from the 10th district (2013–present) (third choice)
- Yudelka Tapia, state assemblymember from the 86th district (2021–present) (second choice)
- Clyde Vanel, state assemblymember from the 33rd district (2017–present) (third choice)

Local officials

- Alexa Avilés, city councilmember from the 38th district (2022–present) (fourth choice)
- Selvena Brooks-Powers, Majority Whip of the New York City Council (2022–present) from the 31st district (2021–present) (third choice)
- Tiffany Cabán, city councilmember from the 22nd district (2021–present) (fourth choice)
- Carmen De La Rosa, city councilmember from the 10th district (2022–present) (fourth choice)
- Crystal Hudson, city councilmember from the 35th district (2022–present) (co-endorsement with Adrienne Adams, Lander, and Mamdani)
- Rita Joseph, city councilmember from the 40th district (2022–present) (second choice)
- Sandy Nurse, city councilmember from the 37th district (2022–present) (co-endorsement with Adrienne Adams, Lander, and Mamdani)
- Chi Ossé, city councilmember from the 36th district (2022–present) (second, third, or fourth choice co-endorsement with Adrienne Adams and Lander)
- Kevin Riley, city councilmember from the 12th district (2021–present) (second choice)
- Nantasha Williams, city councilmember from the 27th district (2021–present) (second choice)

Individuals

- Kurt Andersen, author (third choice)
- Ana Maria Archila, activist and co-director of the New York Working Families Party (fourth choice)
- John Avlon, journalist and board chair of Citizens Union (co-endorsement with Cuomo and Lander)
- Yaacov Behrman, rabbi and activist (second choice)
- Yosef Braun, rabbi (second choice)
- Dante de Blasio, son of former mayor Bill de Blasio (fifth choice)
- Shawn Fain, president of United Auto Workers (2023–present) (third choice, previously endorsed as fourth choice)
- Ilana Glazer, comedian (third choice)
- Devorah Halberstam, gun control activist and co-founder of the Jewish Children's Museum (second choice)
- Shea Hecht, rabbi and radio broadcaster (second choice)
- Sarah McNally, owner of McNally Jackson Books (fourth choice)
- Kenice Mobley, comedian (fifth choice)
- Lynn Nottage, playwright (fourth choice)
- Olayemi Olurin, lawyer and political commentator (third choice)
- AnnaSophia Robb, actress (fourth choice)
- Shaina Taub, actress and musician (third choice)
- Zephyr Teachout, attorney
- Maya Wiley, president and CEO of the Leadership Conference on Civil and Human Rights and candidate for mayor in 2021 (fourth choice)

Labor unions

- District Council 37 (third choice)
- Doctors Council Service Employees International Union (co-endorsement with Adrienne Adams, Lander, Mamdani, and Ramos)
- Professional Staff Congress (fourth or fifth choice co-endorsement with Blake, previously co-endorsed Ramos)
- United Auto Workers Region 9A (third choice, previously endorsed as fourth choice)

Organizations

- Brooklyn Young Democrats (third choice)
- Citizen Action of New York (co-endorsement with Adrienne Adams, Blake, Lander, and Mamdani, previously co-endorsed Ramos)
- Citizens Union (first, second, or third co-endorsement with Cuomo and Lander)
- Citizens Union (co-endorsement with Cuomo and Lander)
- Jews for Racial and Economic Justice (fourth choice)
- Sunrise Movement NYC (second, third, fourth, or fifth choice co-endorsement with Adrienne Adams, Blake, and Lander)
- 1 chapter of Stonewall Democrats (Note: Second choice endorsement from Lambda Independent Democrats of Brooklyn.)
- Working Families Party (fourth choice)

Newspapers

- Washington Square News (fourth choice)
Jessica Ramos

State legislators

- ~~Khaleel Anderson, state assemblymember from the 31st district (2020–present) (fifth choice)~~ (switched endorsement to Blake after Ramos' endorsement of Cuomo)
- ~~Emily Gallagher, state assemblymember from the 50th district (2021–present) (third, fourth, or fifth choice co-endorsement Adrienne Adams and Myrie)~~ (switched endorsement to Blake after Ramos' endorsement of Cuomo)
- ~~Gustavo Rivera, state senator from the 33rd district (2010–present) (third, fourth, or fifth choice co-endorsement with Adrienne Adams and Myrie)~~ (switched endorsement to Blake after Ramos' endorsement of Cuomo)

Individuals

- ~~Ana Maria Archila, activist and co-director of the New York Working Families Party (fifth choice)~~ (withdrew endorsement after Ramos' endorsement of Cuomo)
- Dante de Blasio, son of former mayor Bill de Blasio (fourth choice)
- ~~Shawn Fain, president of United Auto Workers (2023–present) (third choice)~~ (switched endorsement to Blake after Ramos' endorsement of Cuomo)
- Ilana Glazer, comedian (fifth choice)

Labor unions

- Doctors Council Service Employees International Union (co-endorsement with Adrienne Adams, Lander, Mamdani, and Myrie)
- International Alliance of Theatrical Stage Employees Local 161 (second choice co-endorsement with Lander)
- New York State Iron Workers District Council (second choice)
- ~~Professional Staff Congress (fourth or fifth choice co-endorsement with Myrie)~~ (switched endorsement to Blake after Ramos' endorsement of Cuomo)
- Teamsters Local 804 (first choice)
- Teamsters Local 808
- UNITE HERE Local 100 (fourth choice)
- ~~United Auto Workers Region 9A (third choice)~~ (switched endorsement to Blake after Ramos' endorsement of Cuomo)

Organizations

- ~~Citizen Action of New York (co-endorsement with Adrienne Adams, Lander, Mamdani, and Myrie)~~ (switched endorsement to Blake after Ramos' endorsement of Cuomo)
- College Democrats of America (co-endorsement with Lander and Mamdani) (Note: Joint endorsement with its New York state affiliate, as well as its Fordham University chapter; previously endorsed by the New York University chapter.)
- Emgage Action (fourth choice)
- ~~Jews for Racial and Economic Justice (fifth choice)~~ (switched endorsement to Blake after Ramos' endorsement of Cuomo)
- ~~Working Families Party (fifth choice)~~ (withdrew endorsement after Ramos' endorsement of Cuomo)
Scott Stringer

U.S. representatives

- Jerry Nadler, U.S. representative from New York's 12th congressional district (1993–present)
- Alexandria Ocasio-Cortez, U.S. representative from New York's 14th congressional district (2019–present) (fourth choice)
- Nydia Velázquez, U.S. representative from New York's 7th congressional district (1993–present) (fourth choice)

State legislators

- Deborah Glick, state assemblymember from the 66th district (1991–present)
- Micah Lasher, state assemblymember from the 69th district (2025–present)

Individuals

- Graydon Carter, journalist (second choice)
- Ester Fuchs, professor
- Harold Holzer, director of the Roosevelt House Public Policy Institute at Hunter College (second choice)
- Fran Lebowitz, author (first choice)
- Kenice Mobley, comedian (third choice)
- Cynthia Nixon, actor and candidate for governor of New York in 2018 (fourth choice)
Whitney Tilson

Local officials

- Howard Wolfson, former Deputy Mayor of New York City for Governmental Affairs (2010–2013)

Individuals

- ~~Bill Ackman, hedge fund manager~~ (switched endorsement to Cuomo)
- Josh Barro, journalist and former host of Left, Right, & Center
- Reihan Salam, president of Manhattan Institute and former executive editor of National Review (2014–2019) (Republican)

Newspapers

- The Jewish Voice (second choice)
Declined to endorse

U.S. representatives

- Hakeem Jeffries, House Minority Leader (2023–present) from New York's 8th congressional district (2013–present) (endorsed Mamdani post-primary)
- ~~George Latimer, U.S. representative from New York's 16th congressional district (2025–present)~~ (endorsed Cuomo)
- ~~Tom Suozzi, U.S. representative from New York's 3rd congressional district (2017–2023, 2024–present)~~ (endorsed Cuomo)

State legislators

- ~~Eddie Gibbs, state assemblymember from the 68th district (2022–present)~~ (endorsed Cuomo)
- Carl Heastie, Speaker of the New York State Assembly (2015–present) from the 83rd district (2001–present) (endorsed Mamdani post-primary)

Local officials

- Eric Adams, Mayor of New York (2022–present) (Note: Adams stated that he "was planning to write in his own name on the ballot in all five ranked-choice spots".) (endorsed Cuomo post-primary)
- Vanessa Gibson, Bronx Borough President (2022–present)
- Mark Levine, Manhattan Borough President (2022–present) and candidate for New York City comptroller (endorsed Mamdani post-primary)

Individuals

- Jennifer Jones Austin, lawyer and nonprofit CEO

Labor unions

- United Federation of Teachers

Organizations

- Democratic Majority for Israel (Note: While not endorsing a candidate, Democratic Majority for Israel stated that "Zohran Mamdani is an anti-Israel extremist who would put Jewish New Yorkers at risk...New York Democrats must reject him on Tuesday.")
- Third Way (Note: While not endorsing a candidate, Third Way stated that "While we take no position on who Democrats should vote for, we are deeply alarmed by one of the leading candidates: Zohran Mamdani.")

Newspapers

- ~~amNewYork~~ (Note: While not endorsing a candidate, amNewYork stated that Mamdani is "unfit to lead NYC".) (endorsed Cuomo)
- New York Post (Note: While not endorsing a candidate, The Post stated that "Registered Democrats have a duty to reject extremism and keep Zohran Mamdani entirely off their ballots.") (endorsed Eric Adams post-primary)
- The New York Times (Note: While not endorsing a candidate, The Times stated that "We do not believe that Mr. Mamdani deserves a spot on New Yorkers' ballots.")
- Queens Chronicle (Note: While not endorsing a candidate, The Chronicle stated its support of "Anyone but Mamdani".)
- Albany Times Union (Note: While not endorsing a candidate, The Times Union stated that "You have five choices on your ballot. Andrew Cuomo does not deserve to be on that list".)

== Polling ==
=== Ranked-choice polls ===
Final round results (Cuomo vs Mamdani only)

Poll source	Date(s) administered	Sample size (Note: Key: A – all adults RV – registered voters LV – likely voters V – unclear)	Margin of error	RCV count	Adrienne Adams	Eric Adams	Michael Blake	Andrew Cuomo	Brad Lander	Zohran Mamdani	Zellnor Myrie	Jessica Ramos	Scott Stringer	Whitney Tilson	Other	Undecided
Yale Youth Poll/YouGov	June 17–22, 2025	416 (LV)	± 6.7%	1	12%	–	1%	38%	7%	28%	3%	2%	6%	2%	1% Prince: 1% Bartholomew: 0%	–
Yale Youth Poll/YouGov	June 17–22, 2025	416 (LV)	± 6.7%	2	12%	–	1%	38%	7%	28%	3%	2%	6%	2%	1% Prince: 1%	–
Yale Youth Poll/YouGov	June 17–22, 2025	416 (LV)	± 6.7%	3	12%	–	1%	38%	7%	28%	3%	2%	6%	2%	–	–
Yale Youth Poll/YouGov	June 17–22, 2025	416 (LV)	± 6.7%	4	12%	–	–	39%	7%	28%	3%	2%	7%	2%	–	–
Yale Youth Poll/YouGov	June 17–22, 2025	416 (LV)	± 6.7%	5	13%	–	–	40%	7%	29%	3%	–	7%	2%	–	–
Yale Youth Poll/YouGov	June 17–22, 2025	416 (LV)	± 6.7%	6	13%	–	–	40%	7%	29%	3%	–	9%	–	–	–
Yale Youth Poll/YouGov	June 17–22, 2025	416 (LV)	± 6.7%	7	13%	–	–	40%	8%	30%	–	–	9%	–	–	–
Yale Youth Poll/YouGov	June 17–22, 2025	416 (LV)	± 6.7%	8	15%	–	–	41%	–	34%	–	–	10%	–	–	–
Yale Youth Poll/YouGov	June 17–22, 2025	416 (LV)	± 6.7%	9	17%	–	–	45%	–	38%	–	–	–	–	–	–
Yale Youth Poll/YouGov	June 17–22, 2025	416 (LV)	± 6.7%	10	–	–	–	57%	–	43%	–	–	–	–	–	–
HarrisX (Note: This poll was sponsored by Fix the City PAC, which supports Cuomo)	June 11–22, 2025	3,012 (LV)	± 1.8%	1	9%	–	5%	38%	8%	19%	4%	6%	7%	4%	–	–
HarrisX	June 11–22, 2025	3,012 (LV)	± 1.8%	2	9%	–	6%	39%	8%	19%	4%	7%	8%	–	–	–
HarrisX	June 11–22, 2025	3,012 (LV)	± 1.8%	3	10%	–	6%	40%	9%	20%	–	7%	8%	–	–	–
HarrisX	June 11–22, 2025	3,012 (LV)	± 1.8%	4	11%	–	–	41%	9%	21%	–	8%	9%	–	–	–
HarrisX	June 11–22, 2025	3,012 (LV)	± 1.8%	5	13%	–	–	44%	10%	22%	–	–	11%	–	–	–
HarrisX	June 11–22, 2025	3,012 (LV)	± 1.8%	6	16%	–	–	46%	–	24%	–	–	14%	–	–	–
HarrisX	June 11–22, 2025	3,012 (LV)	± 1.8%	7	20%	–	–	52%	–	28%	–	–	–	–	–	–
Emerson College (Note: This poll was sponsored by WPIX and The Hill)	June 18–20, 2025	800 (LV)	± 3.4%	BA	8%	–	0%	35%	13%	32%	2%	1%	3%	2%	0% Bartholomew: 0% Prince: 0%	4%
Emerson College	June 18–20, 2025	800 (LV)	± 3.4%	1	8%	–	0%	36%	13%	34%	2%	1%	3%	2%	0% Bartholomew: 0% Prince: 0%	–
Emerson College	June 18–20, 2025	800 (LV)	± 3.4%	2	8%	–	–	36%	13%	34%	3%	1%	3%	2%	–	–
Emerson College	June 18–20, 2025	800 (LV)	± 3.4%	3	8%	–	–	36%	14%	34%	3%	–	3%	2%	–	–
Emerson College	June 18–20, 2025	800 (LV)	± 3.4%	4	9%	–	–	37%	14%	34%	3%	–	4%	–	–	–
Emerson College	June 18–20, 2025	800 (LV)	± 3.4%	5	10%	–	–	37%	15%	35%	–	–	4%	–	–	–
Emerson College	June 18–20, 2025	800 (LV)	± 3.4%	6	11%	–	–	38%	16%	35%	–	–	–	–	–	–
Emerson College	June 18–20, 2025	800 (LV)	± 3.4%	7	–	–		41%	20%	40%	–	–	–	–	–	–
Emerson College	June 18–20, 2025	800 (LV)	± 3.4%	8	–	–		48%	–	52%	–	–	–	–	–	–
Center for Strategic Politics (Note: This poll was sponsored by Don't Rank Evil Andrew for Mayor (DREAM) for NYC.)	June 13–16, 2025	580 (LV)	± 4.1%	BA	8%	–	2%	37%	9%	29%	2%	2%	6%	0%	2% Bartholomew: 2% Prince: 0%	2%
Center for Strategic Politics	June 13–16, 2025	580 (LV)	± 4.1%	1	9%	–	2%	38%	9%	30%	2%	2%	6%	0%	2% Bartholomew: 2% Prince: 0%	–
Center for Strategic Politics	June 13–16, 2025	580 (LV)	± 4.1%	2	9%	–	2%	38%	9%	30%	2%	2%	6%	0%	2% Bartholomew: 2%	–
Center for Strategic Politics	June 13–16, 2025	580 (LV)	± 4.1%	3	9%	–	2%	38%	9%	30%	3%	2%	6%	–	2% Bartholomew: 2%	–
Center for Strategic Politics	June 13–16, 2025	580 (LV)	± 4.1%	4	10%	–	–	38%	10%	30%	3%	2%	6%	–	2% Bartholomew: 2%	–
Center for Strategic Politics	June 13–16, 2025	580 (LV)	± 4.1%	5	10%	–	–	38%	10%	31%	3%	–	6%	–	2% Bartholomew: 2%	–
Center for Strategic Politics	June 13–16, 2025	580 (LV)	± 4.1%	6	10%	–	–	39%	10%	31%	3%	–	7%	–	–	–
Center for Strategic Politics	June 13–16, 2025	580 (LV)	± 4.1%	7	11%	–	–	40%	10%	32%	–	–	7%	–	–	–
Center for Strategic Politics	June 13–16, 2025	580 (LV)	± 4.1%	8	13%	–	–	41%	11%	34%	–	–	–	–	–	–
Center for Strategic Politics	June 13–16, 2025	580 (LV)	± 4.1%	9	18%	–	–	44%	–	38%	–	–	–	–	–	–
Center for Strategic Politics	June 13–16, 2025	580 (LV)	± 4.1%	10	–	–	–	52%	–	48%	–	–	–	–	–	–
Manhattan Institute	June 10–16, 2025	644 (LV)	± 3.9%	BA	7%	–	1%	39%	6%	27%	3%	1%	4%	1%	1% Prince: 1% Bartholomew: 0%	10%
Manhattan Institute	June 10–16, 2025	644 (LV)	± 3.9%	1	7%	–	1%	43%	6%	30%	3%	1%	5%	1%	1% Prince: 1% Bartholomew: 0%	–
Manhattan Institute	June 10–16, 2025	644 (LV)	± 3.9%	2	7%	–	1%	43%	6%	30%	3%	1%	5%	1%	1% Prince: 1%	–
Manhattan Institute	June 10–16, 2025	644 (LV)	± 3.9%	3	7%	–	1%	44%	6%	31%	3%	1%	5%	1%	–	–
Manhattan Institute	June 10–16, 2025	644 (LV)	± 3.9%	4	7%	–	–	44%	7%	31%	3%	1%	5%	1%	–	–
Manhattan Institute	June 10–16, 2025	644 (LV)	± 3.9%	5	8%	–	–	45%	7%	31%	3%	–	5%	2%	–	–
Manhattan Institute	June 10–16, 2025	644 (LV)	± 3.9%	6	8%	–	–	45%	7%	31%	3%	–	6%	–	–	–
Manhattan Institute	June 10–16, 2025	644 (LV)	± 3.9%	7	9%	–	–	46%	8%	31%	–	–	6%	–	–	–
Manhattan Institute	June 10–16, 2025	644 (LV)	± 3.9%	8	11%	–	–	47%	10%	32%	–	–	–	–	–	–
Manhattan Institute	June 10–16, 2025	644 (LV)	± 3.9%	9	16%	–	–	49%	–	35%	–	–	–	–	–	–
Manhattan Institute	June 10–16, 2025	644 (LV)	± 3.9%	10	–	–	–	56%	–	44%	–	–	–	–	–	–
Marist University	June 9–12, 2025	1,350 (LV)	± 4.3%	BA	7%	–	2%	38%	7%	27%	2%	1%	4%	1%	2% Bartholomew: 1% Prince: 1%	11%
Marist University	June 9–12, 2025	1,350 (LV)	± 4.3%	1	7%	–	2%	43%	8%	31%	2%	1%	4%	1%	2% Bartholomew: 1% Prince: 1%	–
Marist University	June 9–12, 2025	1,350 (LV)	± 4.3%	2	8%	–	2%	43%	8%	31%	3%	–	5%	–	–	–
Marist University	June 9–12, 2025	1,350 (LV)	± 4.3%	3	8%	–	–	44%	8%	32%	3%	–	5%	–	–	–
Marist University	June 9–12, 2025	1,350 (LV)	± 4.3%	4	8%	–	–	45%	9%	32%	–	–	5%	–	–	–
Marist University	June 9–12, 2025	1,350 (LV)	± 4.3%	5	9%	–	–	47%	11%	33%	–	–	–	–	–	–
Marist University	June 9–12, 2025	1,350 (LV)	± 4.3%	6	–	–	–	50%	13%	37%	–	–	–	–	–	–
Marist University	June 9–12, 2025	1,350 (LV)	± 4.3%	7	–	–	–	55%	–	45%	–	–	–	–	–	–
Honan Strategy Group (D) (Note: This poll was sponsored by Destination Tomorrow)	June 5–9, 2025	975 (LV)	± 2.8%	BA	10%	–	1%	38%	12%	22%	2%	0%	4%	0%	–	10%
Honan Strategy Group (D)	June 5–9, 2025	975 (LV)	± 2.8%	1	11%	–	1%	42%	14%	25%	2%	0%	5%	0%	–	–
Honan Strategy Group (D)	June 5–9, 2025	975 (LV)	± 2.8%	2	11%	–	1%	42%	14%	25%	3%	–	5%	0%	–	–
Honan Strategy Group (D)	June 5–9, 2025	975 (LV)	± 2.8%	3	11%	–	1%	42%	14%	25%	3%	–	5%	–	–	–
Honan Strategy Group (D)	June 5–9, 2025	975 (LV)	± 2.8%	4	11%	–	–	43%	14%	25%	3%	–	5%	–	–	–
Honan Strategy Group (D)	June 5–9, 2025	975 (LV)	± 2.8%	5	11%	–	–	43%	15%	25%	–	–	6%	–	–	–
Honan Strategy Group (D)	June 5–9, 2025	975 (LV)	± 2.8%	6	13%	–	–	44%	17%	26%	–	–	–	–	–	–
Honan Strategy Group (D)	June 5–9, 2025	975 (LV)	± 2.8%	7	–	–	–	47%	25%	28%	–	–	–	–	–	–
Honan Strategy Group (D)	June 5–9, 2025	975 (LV)	± 2.8%	8	–	–	–	56%	–	44%	–	–	–	–	–	–
Expedition Strategies (D) (Note: This poll was sponsored by Cuomo's campaign)	June 3–7, 2025	600 (LV)	± 3.9%	1	6%	–	0%	42%	7%	30%	3%	2%	7%	2%	–	–
Expedition Strategies (D)	June 3–7, 2025	600 (LV)	± 3.9%	2	6%	–	–	42%	7%	30%	3%	2%	7%	2%	–	–
Expedition Strategies (D)	June 3–7, 2025	600 (LV)	± 3.9%	3	6%	–	–	43%	8%	30%	4%	3%	7%	–	–	–
Expedition Strategies (D)	June 3–7, 2025	600 (LV)	± 3.9%	4	7%	–	–	43%	8%	31%	4%	–	7%	–	–	–
Expedition Strategies (D)	June 3–7, 2025	600 (LV)	± 3.9%	5	8%	–	–	44%	9%	32%	–	–	7%	–	–	–
Expedition Strategies (D)	June 3–7, 2025	600 (LV)	± 3.9%	6	11%	–	–	46%	10%	34%	–	–	–	–	–	–
Expedition Strategies (D)	June 3–7, 2025	600 (LV)	± 3.9%	7	15%	–	–	48%	–	37%	–	–	–	–	–	–
Expedition Strategies (D)	June 3–7, 2025	600 (LV)	± 3.9%	8	–	–	–	56%	–	44%	–	–	–	–	–	–
Data for Progress (D) (Note: This poll was sponsored by Mamdani's campaign)	May 30 – June 4, 2025	819 (LV)	± 3.0%	BA	6%	–	1%	37%	6%	31%	3%	2%	5%	1%	–	8%
Data for Progress (D)	May 30 – June 4, 2025	777 (LV)	± 3.0%	1	6%	–	1%	40%	8%	33%	3%	2%	6%	1%	–	–
Data for Progress (D)	May 30 – June 4, 2025	777 (LV)	± 3.0%	2	6%	–	1%	40%	8%	33%	3%	2%	6%	–	–	–
Data for Progress (D)	May 30 – June 4, 2025	774 (LV)	± 3.0%	3	7%	–	–	40%	8%	33%	3%	3%	6%	–	–	–
Data for Progress (D)	May 30 – June 4, 2025	771 (LV)	± 3.0%	4	8%	–	–	41%	8%	34%	3%	–	6%	–	–	–
Data for Progress (D)	May 30 – June 4, 2025	771 (LV)	± 3.0%	5	9%	–	–	41%	9%	35%	–	–	6%	–	–	–
Data for Progress (D)	May 30 – June 4, 2025	766 (LV)	± 3.0%	6	9%	–	–	43%	12%	36%	–	–	–	–	–	–
Data for Progress (D)	May 30 – June 4, 2025	756 (LV)	± 3.0%	7	–	–	–	46%	15%	39%	–	–	–	–	–	–
Data for Progress (D)	May 30 – June 4, 2025	710 (LV)	± 3.0%	8	–	–	–	51%	–	49%	–	–	–	–	–	–
Emerson College	May 23–26, 2025	629 (LV)	± 3.9%	BA	8%	–	1%	34%	10%	22%	5%	3%	9%	1%	4% Prince: 3% Bartholomew: 1%	4%
Emerson College	May 23–26, 2025	606 (LV)	± 4.3%	1	8%	–	2%	35%	11%	23%	5%	4%	9%	1%	4% Prince: 3% Bartholomew: 1%	–
Emerson College	May 23–26, 2025	606 (LV)	± 4.3%	2	8%	–	2%	35%	11%	23%	5%	4%	9%	1%	3% Prince: 3%	–
Emerson College	May 23–26, 2025	606 (LV)	± 4.3%	3	8%	–	2%	35%	11%	23%	5%	4%	10%	–	3% Prince: 3%	–
Emerson College	May 23–26, 2025	605 (LV)	± 4.3%	4	8%	–	–	35%	11%	23%	5%	4%	10%	–	3% Prince: 3%	–
Emerson College	May 23–26, 2025	597 (LV)	± 4.3%	5	8%	–	–	36%	12%	23%	6%	5%	10%	–	–	–
Emerson College	May 23–26, 2025	593 (LV)	± 4.3%	6	9%	–	–	38%	13%	24%	7%	–	10%	–	–	–
Emerson College	May 23–26, 2025	586 (LV)	± 4.3%	7	10%	–	–	39%	15%	26%	–	–	11%	–	–	–
Emerson College	May 23–26, 2025	580 (LV)	± 4.3%	8	–	–	–	41%	18%	28%	–	–	13%	–	–	–
Emerson College	May 23–26, 2025	562 (LV)	± 4.3%	9	–	–	–	46%	22%	32%	–	–	–	–	–	–
Emerson College	May 23–26, 2025	500 (LV)	± 4.3%	10	–	–	–	54%	–	46%	–	–	–	–	–	–
Marist University	May 1–8, 2025	3,383 (LV)	± 2.6%	BA	9%	–	<1%	37%	8%	18%	3%	2%	4%	1%	–	17%
Marist University	May 1–8, 2025	3,383 (LV)	± 2.6%	1	11%	–	<1%	44%	10%	22%	4%	2%	5%	1%	–	–
Marist University	May 1–8, 2025	3,383 (LV)	± 2.6%	2	12%	–	–	45%	11%	23%	4%	–	6%	–	–	–
Marist University	May 1–8, 2025	3,383 (LV)	± 2.6%	3	13%	–	–	46%	12%	24%	–	–	6%	–	–	–
Marist University	May 1–8, 2025	3,383 (LV)	± 2.6%	4	13%	–	–	48%	14%	25%	–	–	–	–	–	–
Marist University	May 1–8, 2025	3,383 (LV)	± 2.6%	5	–	–	–	53%	18%	29%	–	–	–	–	–	–
Marist University	May 1–8, 2025	3,383 (LV)	± 2.6%	6	–	–	–	60%	–	40%	–	–	–	–	–	–
Honan Strategy Group (D) (Note: This poll was sponsored by the Greater New York Chamber of Commerce)	April 16–17, 2025	823 (LV)	± 3.4%	BA	4%	–	0%	53%	9%	25%	3%	2%	3%	0%	–	–
Honan Strategy Group (D)	April 16–17, 2025	823 (LV)	± 3.4%	1	4%	–	0%	53%	9%	25%	3%	2%	3%	–	–	–
Honan Strategy Group (D)	April 16–17, 2025	823 (LV)	± 3.4%	2	5%	–	–	53%	9%	25%	3%	2%	3%	–	–	–
Honan Strategy Group (D)	April 16–17, 2025	823 (LV)	± 3.4%	3	5%	–	–	53%	9%	26%	3%	–	4%	–	–	–
Honan Strategy Group (D)	April 16–17, 2025	823 (LV)	± 3.4%	4	5%	–	–	54%	10%	27%	–	–	4%	–	–	–
Honan Strategy Group (D)	April 16–17, 2025	823 (LV)	± 3.4%	5	6%	–	–	56%	12%	27%	–	–	–	–	–	–
Honan Strategy Group (D)	April 16–17, 2025	823 (LV)	± 3.4%	6	–	–	–	56%	14%	28%	–	–	–	–	–	–
Honan Strategy Group (D)	April 16–17, 2025	823 (LV)	± 3.4%	7	–	–	–	64%	–	36%	–	–	–	–	–	–
Siena College (Note: This poll was sponsored by AARP)	April 7–10, 2025	556 (RV)	± 4.9%	BA	6%	–	1%	34%	6%	16%	4%	4%	6%	0%	2% "Other candidate": 2%	20%
Siena College	April 7–10, 2025	556 (RV)	± 4.9%	1	8%	–	1%	44%	8%	20%	6%	5%	8%	1%	–	–
Siena College	April 7–10, 2025	556 (RV)	± 4.9%	2	8%	–	1%	44%	8%	20%	6%	5%	8%	–	–	–
Siena College	April 7–10, 2025	556 (RV)	± 4.9%	3	8%	–	–	44%	9%	20%	6%	5%	9%	–	–	–
Siena College	April 7–10, 2025	556 (RV)	± 4.9%	4	9%	–	–	46%	10%	20%	6%	–	10%	–	–	–
Siena College	April 7–10, 2025	556 (RV)	± 4.9%	5	11%	–	–	46%	11%	23%	–	–	10%	–	–	–
Siena College	April 7–10, 2025	556 (RV)	± 4.9%	6	12%	–	–	47%	14%	23%	–	–	–	–	–	–
Siena College	April 7–10, 2025	556 (RV)	± 4.9%	7	–	–	–	54%	19%	27%	–	–	–	–	–	–
Siena College	April 7–10, 2025	556 (RV)	± 4.9%	8	–	–	–	64%	–	36%	–	–	–	–	–	–
	April 3, 2025	Eric Adams withdraws from the primary														
Data For Progress (D)	March 17–24, 2025	854 (LV)	± 3.0%	BA	5%	7%	1%	39%	8%	15%	2%	1%	4%	1%	–	17%
Data For Progress (D)	March 17–24, 2025	854 (LV)	± 3.0%	1	6%	8%	1%	47%	10%	17%	2%	2%	6%	1%	–	–
Data For Progress (D)	March 17–24, 2025	854 (LV)	± 3.0%	2	6%	8%	–	47%	11%	17%	2%	2%	6%	1%	–	–
Data For Progress (D)	March 17–24, 2025	854 (LV)	± 3.0%	3	6%	8%	–	47%	11%	18%	2%	2%	7%	–	–	–
Data For Progress (D)	March 17–24, 2025	854 (LV)	± 3.0%	4	7%	8%	–	47%	11%	18%	3%	–	7%	–	–	–
Data For Progress (D)	March 17–24, 2025	854 (LV)	± 3.0%	5	7%	8%	–	48%	12%	18%	–	–	7%	–	–	–
Data For Progress (D)	March 17–24, 2025	854 (LV)	± 3.0%	6	–	9%	–	49%	13%	19%	–	–	9%	–	–	–
Data For Progress (D)	March 17–24, 2025	854 (LV)	± 3.0%	7	–	10%	–	52%	17%	21%	–	–	–	–	–	–
Data For Progress (D)	March 17–24, 2025	854 (LV)	± 3.0%	8	–	–	–	60%	18%	22%	–	–	–	–	–	–
Data For Progress (D)	March 17–24, 2025	854 (LV)	± 3.0%	9	–	–	–	70%	–	30%	–	–	–	–	–	–
Honan Strategy Group (D)	March 18–20, 2025	909 (LV)	± 3.2%	BA	4%	6%	0%	41%	8%	18%	2%	2%	4%	0%	–	15%
Honan Strategy Group (D)	March 18–20, 2025	909 (LV)	± 3.2%	1	5%	7%	–	48%	9%	21%	2%	2%	5%	1%	–	–
Honan Strategy Group (D)	March 18–20, 2025	909 (LV)	± 3.2%	2	5%	7%	–	48%	9%	21%	2%	2%	5%	–	–	–
Honan Strategy Group (D)	March 18–20, 2025	909 (LV)	± 3.2%	3	5%	7%	–	49%	10%	22%	–	2%	5%	–	–	–
Honan Strategy Group (D)	March 18–20, 2025	909 (LV)	± 3.2%	4	6%	7%	–	49%	11%	22%	–	–	5%	–	–	–
Honan Strategy Group (D)	March 18–20, 2025	909 (LV)	± 3.2%	5	7%	7%	–	51%	12%	23%	–	–	–	–	–	–
Honan Strategy Group (D)	March 18–20, 2025	909 (LV)	± 3.2%	6	–	7%	–	54%	13%	25%	–	–	–	–	–	–
Honan Strategy Group (D)	March 18–20, 2025	909 (LV)	± 3.2%	7	–	–	–	60%	14%	26%	–	–	–	–	–	–
Honan Strategy Group (D)	March 18–20, 2025	909 (LV)	± 3.2%	8	–	–	–	66%	–	34%	–	–	–	–	–	–
Unite NY/Citizen Data	February 10, 2025	1,000 (RV)	± 6.2%	BA	–	15%	3%	36%	13%	4%	3%	10%	16%	2%	–	–
Unite NY/Citizen Data	February 10, 2025	1,000 (RV)	± 6.2%	1	–	16%	3%	36%	13%	4%	3%	10%	17%	–	–	–
Unite NY/Citizen Data	February 10, 2025	1,000 (RV)	± 6.2%	2	–	16%	–	36%	13%	4%	4%	10%	17%	–	–	–
Unite NY/Citizen Data	February 10, 2025	1,000 (RV)	± 6.2%	3	–	16%	–	37%	13%	5%	–	11%	18%	–	–	–
Unite NY/Citizen Data	February 10, 2025	1,000 (RV)	± 6.2%	4	–	17%	–	37%	14%	–	–	13%	18%	–	–	–
Unite NY/Citizen Data	February 10, 2025	1,000 (RV)	± 6.2%	5	–	19%	–	43%	17%	–	–	–	22%	–	–	–
Unite NY/Citizen Data	February 10, 2025	1,000 (RV)	± 6.2%	6	–	24%	–	47%	–	–	–	–	30%	–	–	–
Unite NY/Citizen Data	February 10, 2025	1,000 (RV)	± 6.2%	7	–	–	–	63%	–	–	–	–	37%	–	–	–
Manhattan Institute	January 24–30, 2025	480 (RV)	± 3.9%	BA	–	14%	0%	30%	13%	1%	2%	5%	11%	–	4% "Someone else": 4% Walden: 0%	20%
Manhattan Institute	January 24–30, 2025	480 (RV)	± 3.9%	1	–	21%	0%	40%	16%	2%	2%	6%	12%	–	0% Walden: 0%	–
Manhattan Institute	January 24–30, 2025	480 (RV)	± 3.9%	2	–	21%	–	40%	16%	2%	2%	6%	12%	–	0% Walden: 0%	–
Manhattan Institute	January 24–30, 2025	480 (RV)	± 3.9%	3	–	21%	–	40%	16%	2%	2%	7%	12%	–	–	–
Manhattan Institute	January 24–30, 2025	480 (RV)	± 3.9%	4	–	21%	–	42%	16%	–	2%	7%	13%	–	–	–
Manhattan Institute	January 24–30, 2025	480 (RV)	± 3.9%	5	–	22%	–	42%	16%	–	–	7%	13%	–	–	–
Manhattan Institute	January 24–30, 2025	480 (RV)	± 3.9%	6	–	22%	–	46%	19%	–	–	–	14%	–	–	–
Manhattan Institute	January 24–30, 2025	480 (RV)	± 3.9%	7	–	25%	–	53%	22%	–	–	–	–	–	–	–
Manhattan Institute	January 24–30, 2025	480 (RV)	± 3.9%	8	–	30%	–	70%	–	–	–	–	–	–	–	–
Honan Strategy Group (D)	January 23–26, 2025	769 (LV)	± 3.5%	BA	–	9%	0%	35%	10%	9%	3%	6%	8%	0%	0% Walden: 0%	20%
Honan Strategy Group (D)	January 23–26, 2025	769 (LV)	± 3.5%	1	–	11%	1%	44%	13%	11%	3%	7%	10%	–	0% Walden: 0%	–
Honan Strategy Group (D)	January 23–26, 2025	769 (LV)	± 3.5%	2	–	11%	1%	44%	13%	11%	3%	7%	10%	–	–	–
Honan Strategy Group (D)	January 23–26, 2025	769 (LV)	± 3.5%	3	–	11%	–	44%	13%	11%	3%	7%	10%	–	–	–
Honan Strategy Group (D)	January 23–26, 2025	769 (LV)	± 3.5%	4	–	11%	–	47%	13%	11%	–	7%	10%	–	–	–
Honan Strategy Group (D)	January 23–26, 2025	769 (LV)	± 3.5%	5	–	12%	–	49%	15%	13%	–	–	12%	–	–	–
Honan Strategy Group (D)	January 23–26, 2025	769 (LV)	± 3.5%	6	–	–	–	58%	17%	13%	–	–	12%	–	–	–
Bold Decision	January 7–13, 2025	807 (LV)	± 3.5%	BA	–	10%	3%	33%	7%	5%	3%	6%	9%	1%	—	24%
Bold Decision	January 7–13, 2025	807 (LV)	± 3.5%	1	–	13%	2%	43%	9%	7%	4%	8%	12%	1%	–	–
Bold Decision	January 7–13, 2025	807 (LV)	± 3.5%	2	–	13%	–	44%	10%	7%	4%	9%	13%	–	–	–
Bold Decision	January 7–13, 2025	807 (LV)	± 3.5%	3	–	14%	–	44%	11%	7%	–	10%	14%	–	–	–
Bold Decision	January 7–13, 2025	807 (LV)	± 3.5%	4	–	14%	–	45%	13%	–	–	13%	14%	–	–	–
Bold Decision	January 7–13, 2025	807 (LV)	± 3.5%	5	–	15%	–	47%	–	–	–	17%	20%	–	–	–
Bold Decision	January 7–13, 2025	807 (LV)	± 3.5%	6	–	–	–	57%	–	–	–	19%	24%	–	–	–
Bold Decision	January 7–13, 2025	807 (LV)	± 3.5%	7	–	–	–	65%	–	–	–	–	35%	–	–	–

=== First-past-the-post polls ===
First round results

Poll source	Date(s) administered	Sample size	Margin of error	Adrienne Adams	Eric Adams	Michael Blake	Andrew Cuomo	Brad Lander	Zohran Mamdani	Zellnor Myrie	Jessica Ramos	Scott Stringer	Whitney Tilson	Others	Undecided
Yale Youth Poll/YouGov (Note: First-choice results from a ranked-choice poll)	June 17–22, 2025	416 (LV)	± 6.7%	12%	–	1%	38%	7%	28%	3%	2%	6%	2%	1% Prince: 1% Bartholomew: 0%	–
HarrisX	June 11–22, 2025	3,012 (LV)	± 1.8%	9%	–	5%	38%	8%	19%	4%	6%	7%	4%	0% Bartholomew: 0% Prince: 0%	–
Emerson College	June 18–20, 2025	800 (LV)	± 3.4%	8%	–	0%	35%	13%	32%	2%	1%	3%	2%	0% Bartholomew: 0% Prince: 0%	4%
Center for Strategic Politics	June 13–16, 2025	580 (LV)	± 4.1%	8%	–	2%	37%	9%	29%	2%	2%	6%	0%	2% Bartholomew: 2% Prince: 0%	2%
Manhattan Institute	June 10–16, 2025	644 (LV)	± 3.9%	7%	–	1%	39%	6%	27%	3%	1%	4%	1%	1% Prince: 1% Bartholomew: 0%	10%
Marist University	June 9–12, 2025	1,350 (LV)	± 4.3%	7%	–	2%	38%	7%	27%	2%	1%	4%	1%	2% Bartholomew: 1% Prince: 1%	11%
Honan Strategy Group (D)	June 5–9, 2025	975 (LV)	± 2.8%	10%	–	1%	38%	12%	22%	2%	0%	4%	0%	–	10%
Public Policy Polling (D) (Note: This poll was sponsored by Justin Brannan's campaign for New York City Comptroller)	June 6–7, 2025	573 (LV)	± 4.1%	4%	–	2%	31%	9%	35%	3%	0%	5%	–	–	11%
Expedition Strategies (D)	June 3–7, 2025	600 (LV)	± 3.9%	6%	–	0%	42%	7%	30%	3%	2%	7%	2%	–	–
Data for Progress (D)	May 30 – June 4, 2025	819 (LV)	± 3.0%	6%	–	1%	37%	6%	31%	3%	2%	5%	1%	–	8%
Emerson College	May 23–26, 2025	606 (LV)	± 3.7%	8%	–	1%	34%	10%	22%	5%	3%	9%	1%	4% Prince: 3% Bartholomew: 1%	4%
Workbench Strategies	May 14–18, 2025	500 (LV)	–	7%	–	0%	40%	8%	27%	5%	1%	6%	2%	–	–
SurveyUSA	May 14–17, 2025	511 (LV)	± 5.2%	6%	–	1%	43%	8%	11%	2%	4%	9%	1%	1% Prince: 1% Bartholomew: 0%	12%
Marist University	May 1–8, 2025	3,383 (LV)	± 2.6%	9%	–	<1%	37%	8%	18%	3%	2%	4%	1%	–	17%
Honan Strategy Group (D)	April 16–17, 2025	823 (LV)	± 3.4%	4%	–	0%	45%	8%	22%	2%	2%	3%	0%	–	14%
Siena College	April 7–10, 2025	556 (RV)	± 4.9%	6%	–	1%	34%	6%	16%	4%	4%	6%	0%	2% "Other candidate": 2%	20%
	April 3, 2025	Eric Adams withdraws from the race													
Emerson College	March 21–24, 2025	653 (LV)	± 3.8%	4%	8%	1%	38%	6%	10%	4%	6%	5%	2%	1% "Someone else": 1%	17%
Data For Progress (D)	March 17–24, 2025	854 (LV)	± 3.0%	5%	7%	1%	39%	8%	15%	2%	1%	4%	1%	–	17%
Honan Strategy Group (D)	March 18–20, 2025	909 (LV)	± 3.2%	4%	6%	0%	41%	8%	18%	2%	2%	4%	0%	–	15%
Quinnipiac University	February 27 – March 3, 2025	771 (RV)	± 3.5%	4%	11%	1%	31%	5%	8%	1%	4%	6%	1%	7% Williams: 7%	21%
Honan Strategy Group (D)	February 22–23, 2025	1,214 (LV)	± 2.8%	2%	10%	3%	38%	7%	12%	2%	1%	5%	0%	–	20%
Unite NY/Citizen Data	February 10, 2025	1,000 (RV)	± 6.2%	–	15%	3%	36%	13%	4%	3%	10%	16%	2%	–	–
Emerson College	February 3–5, 2025	653 (LV)	± 3.8%	–	10%	2%	33%	6%	1%	6%	6%	8%	2%	1% "Someone else": 1%	25%
GBAO (D) (Note: This poll was sponsored by United for a Brighter Tomorrow)	January 29 – February 3, 2025	800 (LV)	± 3.5%	–	12%	–	31%	11%	9%	–	7%	11%	–	–	19%
Manhattan Institute	January 24–30, 2025	480 (RV)	± 3.9%	–	14%	0%	30%	13%	1%	2%	5%	11%	–	4% "Someone else": 4% Walden: 0%	20%
Honan Strategy Group (D)	January 23–26, 2025	769 (LV)	± 3.5%	–	9%	0%	35%	10%	9%	3%	6%	8%	0%	0% Walden: 0%	20%
Bold Decision	January 7–13, 2025	807 (LV)	± 3.5%	–	10%	3%	33%	7%	5%	3%	6%	9%	1%	–	24%
Progressive Democrats of America (D)	December 16–22, 2024	800 (LV)	–	–	6%	2%	32%	8%	6%	1%	7%	10%	–	10% Diaz Jr.: 7% "Other": 3%	18%
The New York Times/Siena College	October 20–23, 2024	853 (LV)	–	–	12%	–	22%	4%	–	0%	2%	2%	–	26% James: 19% Williams: 6% "Another candidate": 1%	28%

=== Other polls ===
Poll source	Date(s) administered	Sample size	Margin of error	RCV count	Adrienne Adams	Selma Bartholomew	Michael Blake	Andrew Cuomo	Brad Lander	Zohran Mamdani	Zellnor Myrie	Paperboy Love Prince	Jessica Ramos	Scott Stringer	Whitney Tilson	Other
SurveyUSA (Note: This poll asked respondents to name their first, second, third, fourth, and fifth choices on their ballots, but did not eliminate candidates in a ranked-choice simulation.)	May 14–17, 2025	511 (LV)	± 5.2%	1	6%	0%	1%	43%	8%	11%	2%	1%	4%	9%	1%	12% (Note: "Undecided with 12%)
SurveyUSA	May 14–17, 2025	449 (LV)	± 5.6%	2	14%	2%	5%	8%	21%	9%	8%	1%	6%	16%	2%	10% (Note: "Would Not Rank Another" with 10%)
SurveyUSA	May 14–17, 2025	406 (LV)	± 6.0%	3	12%	5%	6%	8%	11%	7%	8%	1%	9%	17%	1%	16% (Note: "Would Not Rank Another" with 16%)
SurveyUSA	May 14–17, 2025	343 (LV)	± 6.4%	4	13%	6%	5%	8%	10%	10%	8%	3%	14%	9%	2%	13% (Note: "Would Not Rank Another" with 13%)
SurveyUSA	May 14–17, 2025	299 (LV)	± 6.9%	5	10%	6%	10%	4%	10%	7%	8%	6%	12%	8%	5%	14% (Note: "Would Not Rank Another" with 14%)

Hypothetical polling

Eric Adams vs. Brad Lander

Poll source	Date(s) administered	Sample size	Margin of error	Eric Adams	Brad Lander	Undecided
Slingshot Strategies (D)	May 2–8, 2023	930 (RV)	± 2.5%	48%	17%	35%

Eric Adams vs. Jumaane Williams

Poll source	Date(s) administered	Sample size	Margin of error	Eric Adams	Jumaane Williams	Undecided
Slingshot Strategies (D)	May 2–8, 2023	930 (RV)	± 2.5%	45%	25%	30%

Eric Adams vs. generic Democrat

Poll source	Date(s) administered	Sample size	Margin of error	Eric Adams	Generic Democrat	Undecided
Slingshot Strategies (D)	May 2–8, 2023	930 (RV)	± 2.5%	42%	38%	20%

== Debates ==
The first debate was sponsored by WNBC and held on June 4, 2025. The second debate was sponsored by NY1 and was held on June 12, 2025.

2025 New York City mayoral Democratic primary debates
No.	Date	Host	Moderator	Link	Participants								
Key: P Participant N Non-invitee													
Key: P Participant N Non-invitee					Adams	Blake	Cuomo	Lander	Mamdani	Myrie	Ramos	Stringer	Tilson
1	June 4, 2025	WNBC	Melissa Russo; David Ushery		P	P	P	P	P	P	P	P	P
2	June 12, 2025	NY1	Katie Honan; Brian Lehrer; Errol Louis		P	N	P	P	P	P	N	P	P

== Fundraising ==
In addition to candidate's campaign accounts, super PACs are allowed to make independent expenditures supporting or opposing candidates so long as they do not officially coordinate with candidates. Unlike public matching fund-participating campaign accounts which have a $8 million spending cap, independent expenditure groups have no limit. At the time of the primary, Andrew Cuomo's PAC had amassed $25 million, which was the most money for any mayoral campaign in New York City's history.

Campaign finance reports as of June 23, 2025 Last statement filed: #10 (June 13, 2025)						Independent expenditures as of June 23, 2025 Last statement filed: #23 (June 9, 2025)	
Candidate	Raised	Public matching funds	Total funds	Spent	Est. Cash on hand	Independent expenditures supporting	Independent expenditures opposing
Adrienne Adams	$802,774	$2,481,020	$3,283,794	$1,579,069	$1,704,724	$534,514	$0
Michael Blake	$561,379	$2,096,907	$2,658,286	$611,015	$2,047,271	$0	$0
Selma Bartholomew	$2,182	$0 (Note: Did not qualify.)	$2,182	$1,930	$252	$0	$0
Andrew Cuomo	$4,009,058	$4,255,530	$8,264,588	$5,513,638	$2,750,949	$16,004,459	$944,027
Brad Lander	$1,778,467	$6,417,738	$8,196,205	$6,404,757	$1,791,448	$112,395	$361,367
Zohran Mamdani	$1,708,494	$7,050,417	$8,758,911	$6,332,698	$2,426,214	$1,015,139	$7,487,312
Zellnor Myrie	$947,565	$3,532,810	$4,480,375	$3,534,434	$945,941	$8,715	$0
Paperboy Prince	$165	$0	$165	$1	$164	$0	$0
Jessica Ramos	$288,832	$0	$288,832	$414,576	$-125,743	$0	$0
Scott Stringer	$1,121,226	$4,418,651	$5,539,877	$4,564,570	$975,307	$79,167	$361,367
Whitney Tilson	$811,772	$2,349,364	$3,161,136	$2,239,116	$922,020	$0	$0
Source: New York City Campaign Finance Board

== Results ==
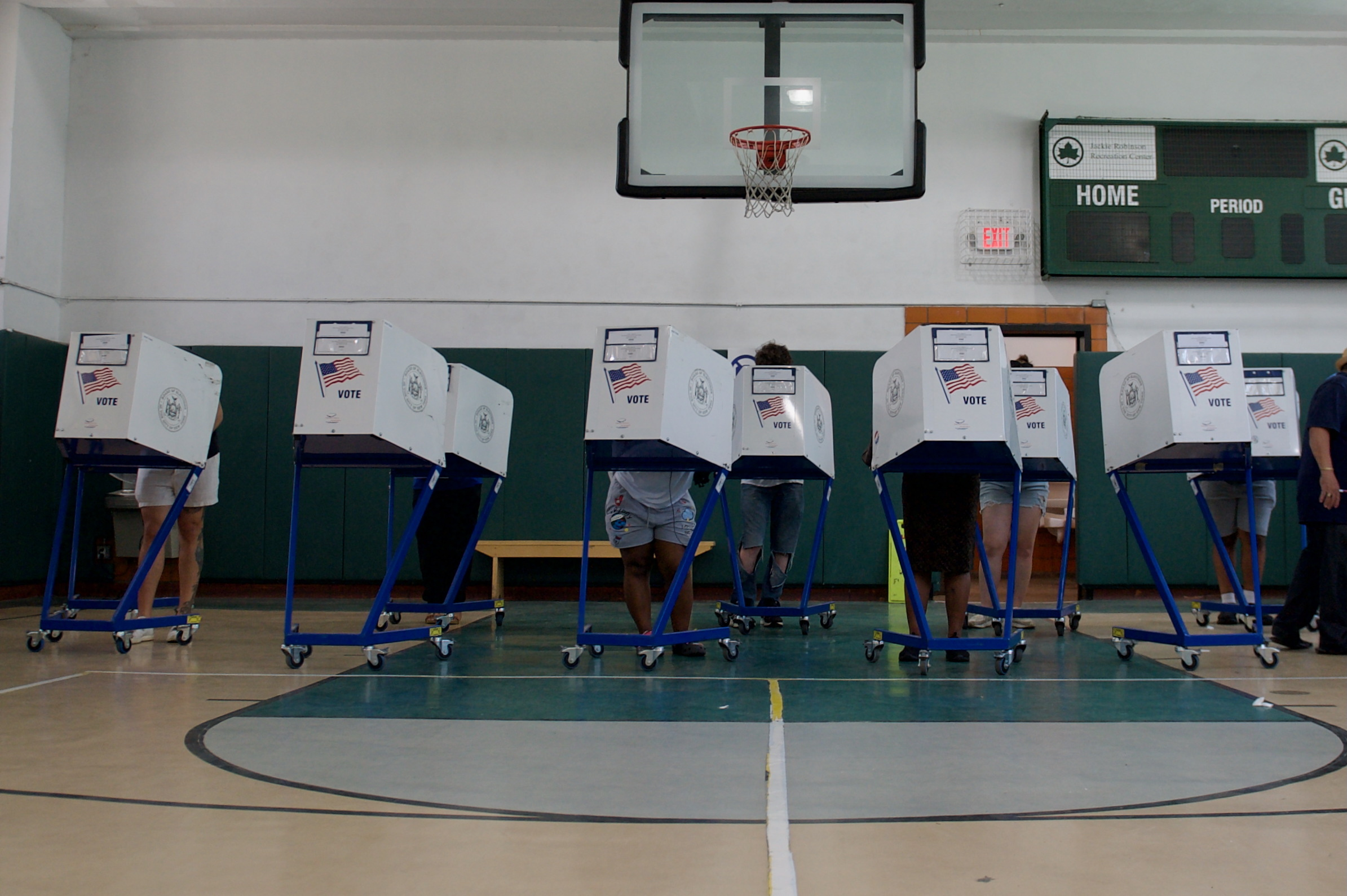
Democratic voters in the 2025 primary elections cast their ballots at Jackie Robinson Recreation Center.

384,251 people voted early in the primary, more than double the turnout of 2021. As of June 20, there were 45,597 scanned, valid mail-in ballots.

The New York City Board of Elections released unofficial results of the first-choice votes on election night. Unofficial results of all rankings were released a week later, taking into account mail-in ballots received after election night, cured ballots, and provisional ("affidavit") ballots.

On the night of the election, with about 90% of the votes counted, Mamdani led Cuomo by about seven percentage points, becoming the presumptive winner and prompting Cuomo to concede at around 11:15 p.m. that night. Lander gave his concession speech at Mamdani's watch party, with chants of "Brad" as he hugged Mamdani supporters. Afterward, Congresswoman Nydia Velázquez addressed the crowd, followed by Attorney General Letitia James, before Mamdani finally addressed supporters, claiming victory at 12:20 a.m.

Mamdani drew support from the middle and upper-middle classes, and White, Hispanic, and Asian voters, while making inroads with young Black voters. Cuomo won in many majority Black precincts, and drew support from the lower and upper classes. Cuomo performed better in areas with lower density, while Mamdani performed better in areas with medium and higher density. Mamdani performed well with young voters "across all races and classes" and benefitted from an increase in youth turnout.

Mamdani's victory was announced by the Associated Press on July 1 after the Board of Elections released its ranked-choice ballot tabulation. The Board of Elections certified the results on July 22.

=== Overall ===
Map of total inactive ballots by precinct

2025 New York City Democratic mayoral primary
Candidate	Round 1		Round 2		Round 3	
Candidate	Votes	%	Votes	%	Votes	%
Zohran Mamdani	469,642	43.82%	469,755	43.86%	573,169	56.39%
Andrew Cuomo	387,137	36.12%	387,377	36.17%	443,229	43.61%
Brad Lander	120,634	11.26%	120,707	11.27%	Eliminated	
Adrienne Adams	44,192	4.12%	44,359	4.14%	Eliminated	
Scott Stringer	17,820	1.66%	17,894	1.67%	Eliminated	
Zellnor Myrie	10,593	0.99%	10,648	0.99%	Eliminated	
Whitney Tilson	8,443	0.79%	8,525	0.80%	Eliminated	
Michael Blake	4,366	0.41%	4,389	0.41%	Eliminated	
Jessica Ramos	4,273	0.40%	4,294	0.40%	Eliminated	
Paperboy Prince	1,560	0.15%	1,628	0.15%	Eliminated	
Selma Bartholomew	1,489	0.14%	1,505	0.14%	Eliminated	
Write-ins	1,581	0.15%	Eliminated			
Active votes	1,071,730	100.00%	1,071,081	99.94%	1,016,398	94.84%
Exhausted ballots	—N/a		649	0.06%	55,332	5.16%
Source: New York City Board of Elections

=== By borough ===
==== First round ====
Mamdani attained the plurality of first-choice votes in three boroughs — Brooklyn, Queens, and Manhattan — while Cuomo did so in Staten Island and claimed a majority in the Bronx. Mamdani recorded his best result in Brooklyn, outperforming Cuomo by 18% of the vote and enjoying strong turnout, and performed well in Queens, where he has represented the 36th district since 2021. Mamdani's margin of victory was narrowest in Manhattan, where neither he nor Cuomo passed the 40% threshold. Conversely, Cuomo did the best in the Bronx, beating Mamdani by almost 18% of the vote. Finally, he secured the traditionally conservative-leaning Staten Island, albeit by a margin of just some 8% of the vote.

Candidate
Candidate	Brooklyn		Queens		Manhattan		Staten Island		Bronx	
Candidate	Votes	%	Votes	%	Votes	%	Votes	%	Votes	%
Zohran Mamdani	187,785	49.24%	105,884	46.47%	125,573	39.37%	11,263	38.08%	39,137	34.33%
Andrew Cuomo	119,131	31.24%	87,376	38.34%	107,491	33.70%	13,581	45.91%	59,558	52.25%
Brad Lander	45,054	11.81%	14,175	6.22%	55,594	17.43%	1,763	5.96%	4,048	3.55%
Adrienne Adams	13,736	3.6%	11,396	5.0%	11,928	3.74%	1,283	4.34%	5,849	5.13%
Scott Stringer	4,253	1.12%	3,467	1.52%	7,601	2.38%	805	2.72%	1,694	1.49%
Zellnor Myrie	5,362	1.41%	1,170	0.51%	3,225	1.01%	142	0.48%	694	0.61%
Whitney Tilson	2,186	0.57%	1,230	0.54%	4,420	1.39%	207	0.7%	400	0.35%
Michael Blake	1,301	0.34%	786	0.34%	1,008	0.32%	124	0.42%	1,147	1.01%
Jessica Ramos	1,003	0.26%	1,299	0.57%	1,034	0.32%	158	0.53%	779	0.68%
Paperboy Prince	499	0.13%	424	0.19%	386	0.12%	102	0.34%	149	0.13%
Selma Bartholomew	434	0.11%	301	0.13%	371	0.12%	69	0.23%	314	0.28%
Write-ins	601	0.16%	367	0.16%	312	0.1%	82	0.28%	219	0.19%
Total counted votes	381,345	100.0%	227,875	100.0%	318,943	100.0%	29,579	100.0%	113,988	100.0%

==== Final round ====
Mamdani and Cuomo repeated their earlier performances, with Brooklyn, Queens and Manhattan going to Mamdani and Cuomo winning in Staten Island and the Bronx.

Candidate
Candidate	Brooklyn		Queens		Manhattan		Staten Island		Bronx	
Candidate	Votes	%	Votes	%	Votes	%	Votes	%	Votes	%
Zohran Mamdani	229,762	63.0%	120,804	55.41%	165,561	55.64%	12,863	46.06%	44,179	40.84%
Andrew Cuomo	134,962	37.0%	97,198	44.59%	132,005	44.36%	15,064	53.94%	64,000	59.16%
Total counted votes	364,724	100.0%	218,002	100.0%	297,566	100.0%	27,927	100.0%	108,179	100.0%

First round by congressional district

In the first round, Mamdani won 7 of 13 congressional districts which include parts of New York City, while Cuomo won six.

District	Cuomo	Mamdani	Lander	Other	Representative
3rd (part)	46%	39%	7%	8%	Tom Suozzi
5th	51%	33%	2%	14%	Gregory Meeks
6th	42%	43%	7%	8%	Grace Meng
7th	21%	65%	10%	4%	Nydia Velázquez
8th	38%	46%	6%	10%	Hakeem Jeffries
9th	43%	42%	7%	8%	Yvette Clarke
10th	23%	46%	23%	8%	Dan Goldman
11th	41%	42%	7%	10%	Nicole Malliotakis
12th	37%	33%	21%	9%	Jerry Nadler
13th	34%	47%	9%	10%	Adriano Espaillat
14th	34%	53%	6%	7%	Alexandria Ocasio-Cortez
15th	52%	33%	5%	10%	Ritchie Torres
16th (part)	64%	21%	2%	13%	George Latimer

Final round by congressional district

In the final round, Mamdani won 9 of 13 congressional districts which include parts of New York City, while Cuomo won four.

District	Cuomo	Mamdani	Representative
3rd (part)	54%	46%	Tom Suozzi
5th	60%	40%	Gregory Meeks
6th	48%	51%	Grace Meng
7th	24%	76%	Nydia Velázquez
8th	44%	56%	Hakeem Jeffries
9th	48%	52%	Yvette Clarke
10th	32%	68%	Dan Goldman
11th	48%	52%	Nicole Malliotakis
12th	49.95%	50.05%	Jerry Nadler
13th	40%	59%	Adriano Espaillat
14th	38%	62%	Alexandria Ocasio-Cortez
15th	59%	40%	Ritchie Torres
16th (part)	73%	26%	George Latimer

=== Maps ===
==== By round ====
First round	Second round	Third round
Mamdani 20–30% 30–40% 40–50% 50–60% 60–70% 70–80% 80–90% 90–100% Cuomo 20–30% 30–40% 40–50% 50–60% 60–70% 70–80% 80–90% 90–100% Lander 30–40% 40–50% 60–70% 90–100% Adams 90–100% Tie 20-30% 30–40% 40–50% 50% No Votes

==== Other maps ====
First-round votes won by non-Mamdani/Cuomo candidates

First-round votes won by Mamdani and Lander, combined

== Aftermath ==
Mamdani's win was widely viewed as an upset victory over Cuomo, and emblematic of a struggle between left-wing and centrist factions of the Democratic Party following Democratic losses in the 2024 federal elections. Jerry Nadler, a Democrat representing parts of Manhattan in the House of Representatives, described the result as a "seismic election for the Democratic Party that I can only compare to Barack Obama's in 2008", and endorsed Mamdani. President Donald Trump, originally a resident of Queens, called the result "a big moment in the History of our Country".

The New York Times reported that the night following the primary, independent mayoral candidate Eric Adams met with a loose consortium of hedge fund managers, landlords, and cryptocurrency moguls who were "aghast" at the result and seeking a strategy to oppose Mamdani in the general election. CNBC reported that figures on Wall Street were "alarmed" and "depressed", while CNN reported that some in the luxury real estate market felt wary and cautious due to Mamdani's housing and tax policies. Conversely, labor unions including SEIU 32BJ and the New York State Nurses Association endorsed Mamdani in the week following the primary.

Two days after the primary, sources close to Cuomo told CNN that he would remain in the race as an independent, which Cuomo confirmed several weeks later, shifting his branding towards an independent run. Cuomo's brother, former CNN host Chris Cuomo, attacked Mamdani as an "open socialist" and declared the Democratic Party "dead". The prospect of New York electing a Muslim mayor triggered various commentators, mostly conservative, to engage in Islamophobic attacks on Mamdani, tying him to jihad, burqas, sharia, and the 9/11 attacks. Trump and other Republican officials threatened to arrest or deport Mamdani if he won the election.

=== Mamdani's political base ===
The "Commie Corridor" highlighted in red

Following the election, the term "Commie Corridor" was popularized by political analyst Michael Lange to describe the geography of Mamdani's leftist base. The region consists of neighborhoods in western Queens and northern Brooklyn, including Astoria, Long Island City, Sunnyside, Greenpoint, Williamsburg, East Williamsburg, Fort Greene, and Clinton Hill. Lange has stated that the election expanded the corridor to include Ridgewood, Woodhaven, Bushwick, Cypress Hills, and Bedford–Stuyvesant. The gentrified neighborhoods are largely young, white and Latino, upper-middle class, college-educated renters. The corridor has a "bohemian culture similar to that of college towns". In these neighborhoods, Mamdani's margin over Andrew Cuomo reached as high as 52 points. Cynthia Nixon carried the area in the 2018 New York gubernatorial election. Mamdani, however, also performed well in areas outside the region, an improvement over past progressives.

Writer Michael Lind in The Telegraph framed Mamdani's win as a conflict between metropolitan professionals in the corridor and the metropolitan rich. He said that professionals, priced out of Manhattan, envied the rich and their servants. The Wall Street Journal said that Mamdani's base in the area were "downwardly mobile millennials" who felt they were worse-off than their parents. Mamdani performed best among both Generation Z and Millennial voters.
