= Yaacov Behrman =

American rabbi and activist

Rabbi Yaacov Behrman
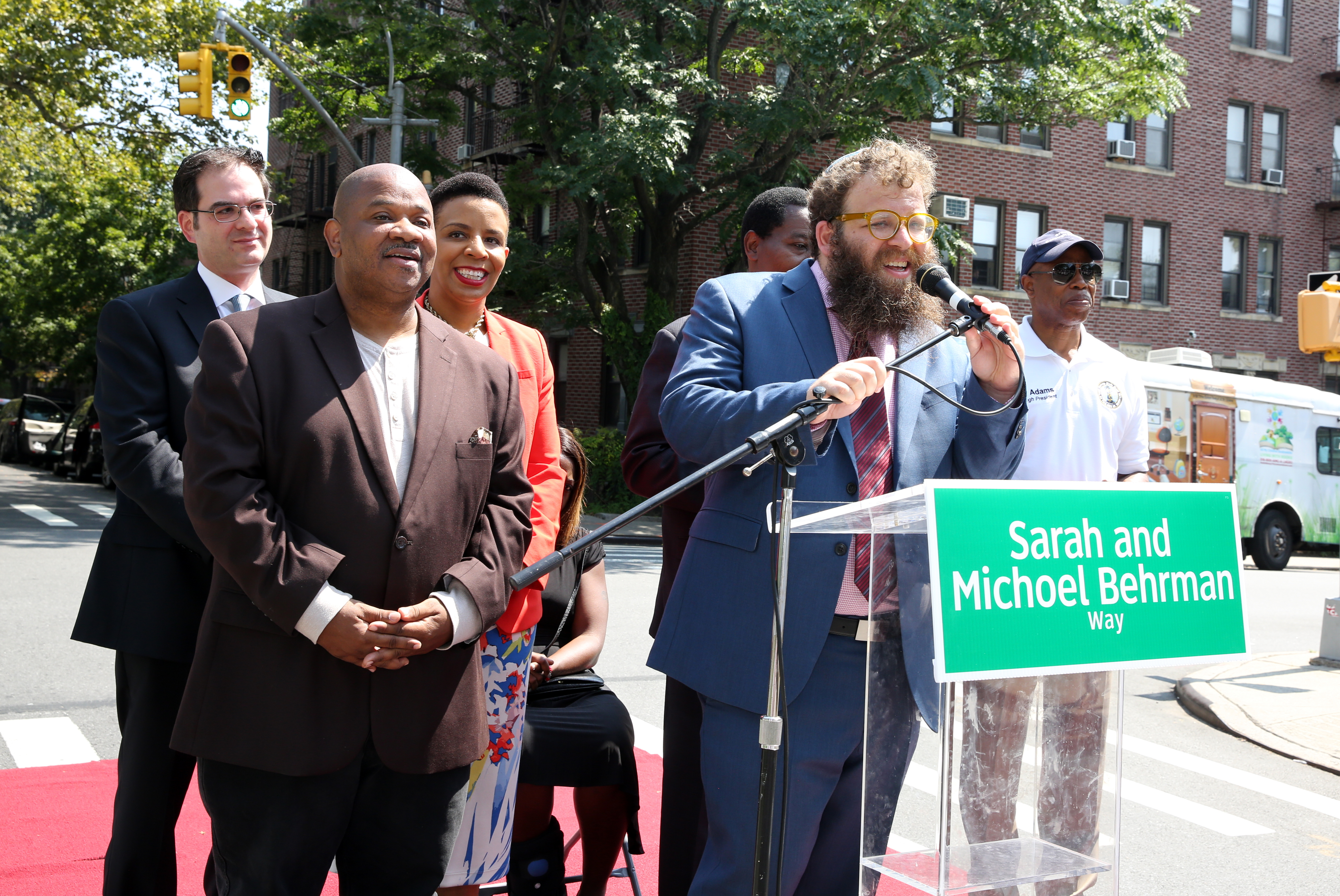
- Rabbi Yaacov Behrman

Personal life
- Born: 1982 (age 43–44)
- Education: Rabbinical Ordination by Mordechai Eliyahu and Zelig Sharfstein; Bellevue University (MA)
- Known for: Director of Operation Survival, founder of Jewish Future Alliance, social activism
- Occupation: Rabbi, activist

Religious life
- Religion: Judaism
- Movement: Chabad-Lubavitch

Yaacov Behrman is an American rabbi, the director of Operation Survival, and a liaison for Chabad Headquarters. Behrman is also the founder of the Jewish Future Alliance, and a former member of Community Board 9.

== Education ==
Behrman was ordained by the former Chief Rabbi of Israel, Rav Mordechai Eliyahu, and Rabbi Zelig Sharfstein, Chief Rabbi of the Vaad Ho'ir of Cincinnati. He earned his M.A. degree in Educational Leadership from Bellevue University, and is a New York State Certified Prevention Professional and Gambling Specialty Designation.

== Activism ==
Behrman is a social activist who has advanced race relations in New York. Behrman served on Mayor Eric Adams's Jewish advisory committee, and on De Blasio's multi-ethnic interfaith Neighborhood Safety Coalition, and is a member of the Kings County Democratic County Committee. In April 2022, Rabbi Behrman and the Jewish Future Alliance co-sponsored the first Glatt Kosher Iftar Meal in Crown Heights. The event advanced Muslim-Jewish relations, and created further dialogue between Chassidic Jews in Brooklyn, and their Muslim neighbors.

Behrman is considered a political moderate, and is in regular contact with New York and national politicians regarding issues that effect the Jewish community, and Chabad.

In 2026, Behrman authored The Yellow Bus Ride, a children’s book about civic education and the importance of civic participation. Published by the Jewish Future Alliance, the book was distributed to 4,000 families in Brooklyn. Behrman also compiled three books for Operation Survival’s Prevention 101 series: Summer Parenting, Parenting in a Post–October 7 World, and Raising Children in Challenging Times. Addressing summer safety, trauma, and mental health, the books were based on interviews with mental health professionals responding to questions submitted by parents.

== Operation Survival ==
Operation Survival is a drug prevention program by the National Committee for the Furtherance of Jewish Education (N.C.F.J.E) that provides evidence-based programming in local yeshivas and public schools and provides classes and seminars for parents in drug prevention and mental health. Operation Survival played a leading role in educating the community on the opioid epidemic. NCFJE was the first Jewish organization in New York State to launch an overdose prevention Naloxone training program. In recognition for Operation Survival's efforts to fight the Opioid Epidemic, Behrman was invited by New York Attorney General Letitia James, in October 2021, to stand with her as she began her statewide 'HealNY' tour to combat the opioid epidemic. The organization has been credited with working to bring the racially diverse community of Crown Heights together in common cause.

== Chabad ==
Behrman is a director of media relations at Lubavitch International, the official news service of the Chabad movement, and a public relations liaison for Chabad Headquarters where he occasionally acts as a Chabad spokesperson. He has also helped coordinate Chabad's response during times of crises. On the first anniversary of the Mumbai attacks, Chabad sent Behrman to Mumbai to help organize the memorial.

As a rabbinical student, Behrman traveled to many countries in Africa to lead holiday services, and help with community development. Many of these countries now have permanent Chabad centers. In 2011, as part of the official Chabad delegation, Behrman visited Kinshasa, to celebrate 20 years of Chabad's presence in Central Africa.

As a Chabad liaison, Behrman has coordinated and facilitated many visits by elected officials and international dignitaries to Chabad institutions, including the Ohel, the gravesite of Rabbi Menachem Mendel Schneerson.

In 2025, he accompanied Zohran Mamdani, then mayor-elect, on a visit to the Ohel after Mamdani reached out following a terrorist attack at a Chabad event in Sydney. The visit drew public attention.

== Awards ==
In 2014, Behrman was named by the Jewish Week as one of "36 Under 36" for his activism, and for working to improve relations between the Jewish and African American communities in Crown Heights, and NCFJE honored Behrman at their 83rd Gala Dinner in 2023.
