= Vaad Rabonei Lubavitch =

Brooklyn committee of rabbis

- Central Committee of Chabad-Lubavitch Rabbis in the United States and Canada
- ועד רבני ליובאוויטש
- Abbreviation: VRL
- Formation: 1969
- Founder: Shneur Zalman Gurary
- Location: New York City, United States
- Director: Rabbi Nochum Schapiro
- Subsidiaries: Lamed-K
- Website: vaadraboneilubavitch.com

Vaad Rabonei Lubavitch (VRL) is an executive committee of Chabad rabbis which oversees Halachic and Jewish legal decisions in Chabad. Its headquarters is in Crown Heights, Brooklyn, New York near Chabad Headquarters at 770 Eastern Parkway. The committee was established in 1969 by Rabbi Shneur Zalman Gurary, headed by Rabbi Zalman Shimon Dworkin.

== Members ==
=== Current ===
- Rabbi Moshe Bogomilsky
- Rabbi Nochem Yitzhak Kaplan

=== Past ===
- Rabbi Chaim Meir Bukiet
- Rabbi Yisroel Friedman
- Rabbi Zelig Sharfstein
- Rabbi Zalman Posner
