= Yisroel Friedman (rosh yeshiva) =

American rabbi (1936–2020)

Rabbi Yisroel Friedman
- ישראל פרידמן
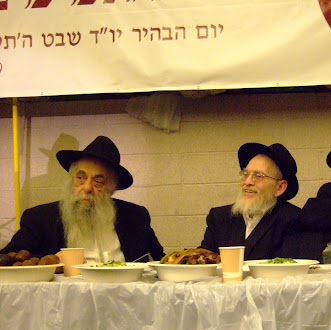
- Rabbi Yisroel Friedman (right) seated on the dais along with Rabbi Yoel Kahn (left)

Personal life
- Born: November 28, 1936 Beshenkovichi, Byelorussia, Soviet Union
- Died: April 1, 2020 (aged 83) Manhattan, New York City, New York

Religious life
- Religion: Judaism

Jewish leader
- Position: Rosh Yeshiva
- Yeshiva: Oholei Torah Talmudical Seminary

Rabbi Yisroel Friedman (November 28, 1936 – April 1, 2020) was a member of the Central Committee of Chabad-Lubavitch Rabbis and the rosh yeshiva of the Oholei Torah Talmudical Seminary in Brooklyn, New York.

== Early life ==
Friedman was born in Beshenkovichi in then Byelorussia, Soviet Union on November 28, 1936, to Yaakov and Gittel; the family were Boyan Hasidim (many of whom are named for Yisrael Friedman of Ruzhin). Friedman's father was a graveyard worker, and unofficial communal rabbi; he was killed in World War II while fighting in the Russian Army. Friedman's mother - a seamstress - then fled with her family to Samarkand, Uzbekistan and then Germany and France before moving to Israel.

== Teaching career ==
In 1956 he moved to New York. In 1959 he began teaching the Chabad yeshiva in Newark, New Jersey. In 1965 he began teaching in the Oholei Torah Talmudical Seminary. He was known for his sharp intellect, argumentative teaching style and expertise in analyzing Rashi's commentaries.

== Death ==
Friedman died on April 1, 2020, from COVID-19. He was predeceased by his wife who died in 2014.
