= Devorah Halberstam =

American political activist

Devorah Halberstam is an American political activist who rose to prominence following the murder of her son Ari in 1994. This has led to recognition and prominence deemed unusual for a Hasidic woman. Several years after the FBI's re-classification of the shooting from an act of road rage to an act of terrorism, Halberstam was awarded with the FBI's New York Division's Director's Community Leadership Award in 2009. Former Governor George Pataki cited the Halberstams’ efforts in his quest to have the death penalty restored. She, together with Governor George Pataki and other officials, was instrumental in enacting the Anti-Terrorism Act of 2001, the first of its kind in New York State.

Halberstam is the mother of 5 children, 2 daughters and 3 sons, of whom Ari was eldest.

Halberstam is one of the founders of the Jewish Children's Museum, which was dedicated in the memory of her son. Halberstam is the museum's director of External Affairs. The museum promotes tolerance by educating children about Jews and Jewish culture.

She is noted for her work as an educator on the dangers of antisemitic terrorism.

Halberstam is an advocate for gun control. She advocated for Ari's Law which prohibits interstate gun trafficking.

== Awards ==
Halberstam is the recipient of numerous awards including the FBI Community Leadership Award, Top Brooklyn Businesswomen Networking Award, Con Edison's Brooklyn Women of Distinction Award, and was a nominee for the Ellis Island Medal of Honor.
