= Zelig Sharfstein =

American rabbi

Ezriel Zelig Sharfstein (July 21, 1928– February 11, 2008) was a prominent Chabad rabbi, the Chief Rabbi of the Vaad Ho'ir of Cincinnati, and an international authority on Jewish law. He was a long time, distinguished member on the Executive Committee of Chabad-Lubavitch Rabbis.

== Life ==
He was born in 1928 on the Lower East Side of Manhattan. He was ordained as a rabbi in 1952 and married Reba Kazornovsky in 1954. He was hand-picked by Rabbi Eliezer Silver, to teach in the city's Jewish Day School. In 1964, Silver, then the president of the Agudath HaRabbonim and one of American Jewry's foremost leaders, promoted him to the role of principal.
