= Olayemi Olurin =

Lawyer and commentator in the United States

Olayemi Olurin is a Nigerian, Bahamian, and American lawyer, political commentator, writer, and prison abolitionist. Olurin hosts a YouTube show, "Olurinatti The Show," and a podcast, "Olay & Friends." She contributes to outlets like Teen Vogue and has her own Substack, "Olurinatti," where she writes about socio-political issues.

== Early life and education ==
Olurin was born and raised in Nassau, The Bahamas, and moved to the United States in 2008 to attend high school at St. Edmund's Academy in Pittsburgh , Pennsylvania. She is Yoruba on her father's side and Bahamian on her mother's side. She experienced racism from other students in high school. Olurin holds a B.A. in Political Science, African American Studies, and Law, Justice & Culture from Ohio University and a JD from St. John's University School of Law in 2018.

== Career ==
From 2018 until 2022, Olurin worked as a public defender at The Legal Aid Society in New York City.

In 2021, she gained attention for posting a video on Twitter showing an NYPD officer kneeling on one of her client's necks, which led to the charges being dismissed. Olurin is an advocate for criminal justice and prison reform. She has focused on issues at Rikers Island. Her work often covers topics such as deadnaming in the transgender community. She advocates for reallocating resources from policing and prisons to address poverty and social issues.

Olurin criticized the Kyle Rittenhouse verdict on The Hill's web series Rising. She believes that diversifying police departments alone cannot address racism and violence within policing. She believes that more police are not the solution to increases in crime and mass shootings. Olurin has argued that Donald Trump's felony convictions should not be used as a reason to push for felon disenfranchisement.

In an interview on The Breakfast Club on 105.1 FM with then-Mayor of New York City Eric Adams, Olurin challenged Adams on his administration's policies. Adams faced intense questioning from her about his policies on crime and punishment.

== Personal Life ==
Olurin, as of 2024, is based in Flatbush, Brooklyn. She is married and lives with her husband CJ and their four pets.
