= Sam Haselby =

Historian and editor

Sam Haselby is a historian and editor of Aeon magazine.

Haselby is a historian of early America with a particular interest in religion and politics. He was a Junior Fellow at the Harvard Society of Fellows and has been a faculty member at the American University of Beirut, the American University in Cairo and at Columbia University in New York City. He was a Senior Executive Producer at Al Jazeera America and is the author of The Origins of American Religious Nationalism (Oxford University Press, 2014).

== Works ==
- Haselby, Sam (2015). The Origins of American Religious Nationalism. Oxford University Press. ISBN 978-0-19-932958-8.
