= Jewish Children's Museum =

Museum in Brooklyn, New York

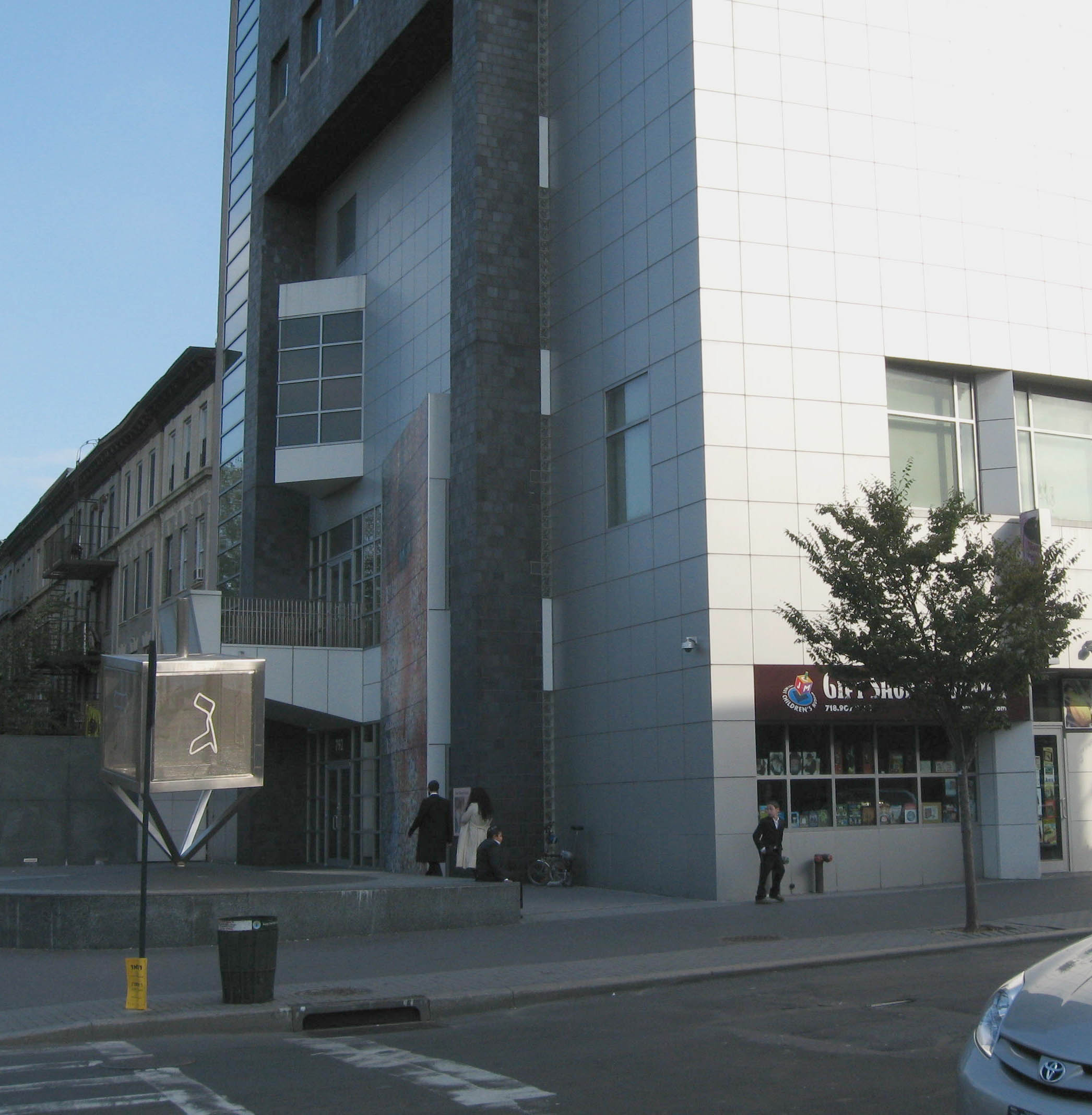
- Established: 2004
- Location: 792 Eastern Parkway, Brooklyn, New York
- Coordinates: 40.668889°N 73.941917°W
- Public transit access: Subway: train at Kingston Avenue; Bus: B17, B43
- Website: Official website

The Jewish Children's Museum is a Jewish-themed children's museum at 792 Eastern Parkway in Brooklyn, New York, U.S. It aims for children of all faiths and backgrounds to gain a positive perspective and awareness of the Jewish heritage, fostering tolerance and understanding. The permanent collection features exhibits designed to be both educational and entertaining to children, often employing interactive multimedia. At the miniature golf course on the roof, for example, each hole represents a stage in Jewish life.

The museum is located in the Chabad-Lubavitch Chasidic community of Crown Heights, near 770 Eastern Parkway, the headquarters of the Lubavitch movement. Built by architect, Steve H. Wilkowski of Milagros PM, the museum opened in 2004. In 2005, the museum was among 406 New York City arts and social service institutions to receive part of a $20 million grant from the Carnegie Corporation, which was made possible through a donation by New York City mayor Michael Bloomberg.

== History ==
In response to the infamous Crown Heights Riot in 1991 and the terrorist killing of 16-year-old yeshiva student Ari Halberstam on the Brooklyn Bridge in 1994, the museum was built to create a teaching tool for local children to better understand their neighbors.

Planning for the exhibit content was done with the input of various religious and secular educators, with the final word being made by the museum's Orthodox Jewish directorate.

Community activist Devorah Halberstam, mother of Ari, played a major role in the museum's creation. The museum is officially dedicated to Ari's memory.

The front of the museum displays a giant collage of pictures of children. When viewed from a distance they form one giant picture of a child.

== Details ==
- The Jewish Children's Museum was designed by Gwathmey, Siegel and Associates Architects.
- The cost of construction has been $35 million thus far, with an additional $5 million projected after the completion of the fourth-floor exhibits (expected summer of 2011).
- The museum won the Building Brooklyn Award in 2006 for its design and social impact on the greater Brooklyn community.
- More than 250,000 visitors came to the JCM in its first year of operation
- In addition to its computerized and interactive exhibits, the JCM building includes a Kosher restaurant, Kosher cafe, gift shop, social hall, 100-seat theater, gameshow studio, and arts and crafts center.
- With 3 floors of non-stop exhibit fun & exploring.
- Exodus Unlocked is the high-thrills escape room challenge at The Jewish Children’s Museum! Launched in February 2026, this immersive experience dares you to beat the clock and escape ancient Egypt in under an hour. While most escape rooms cater strictly to grown-ups, this one is uniquely crafted to challenge kids, though adults will still find plenty of puzzles to sweat over!
- The Jewish Children's Museum operates the Public School Initiative, a structured educational outreach program targeted at public school groups and individuals with minimal prior exposure to Jewish culture. The initiative is divided into two distinct age-appropriate curricula: Cultural Connections for grades 1–4, which focuses on holiday cycles, dietary laws, and customs through interactive exhibits, and Building Bridges for grades 5–12, which covers Jewish historical origins, resilience, and civic discussions on mutual acceptance. The program offers grant opportunities for New York City schools, includes professional development previews for educators, and requires participating classes to complete follow-up lessons to fulfill grant criteria.
- Anti-Bias Media Outreach: The museum utilizes narrative media to address the root causes of antisemitism, racism, and xenophobia. In the video "Change the Way You See How To Combat Anti-Semitism Forever…", a young student who has vandalized his school is taught to see every person as possessing an individual, invaluable "spark" [01:00]. The program explicitly addresses how discriminatory ideologies like Nazism seek to categorize people as useful or useless, countering this by emphasizing that a healthy society requires the inclusion and acceptance of all marginalized groups, including Black, brown, special needs, homeless, and Jewish individuals [03:07].
