= Kenice Mobley =

American comedian

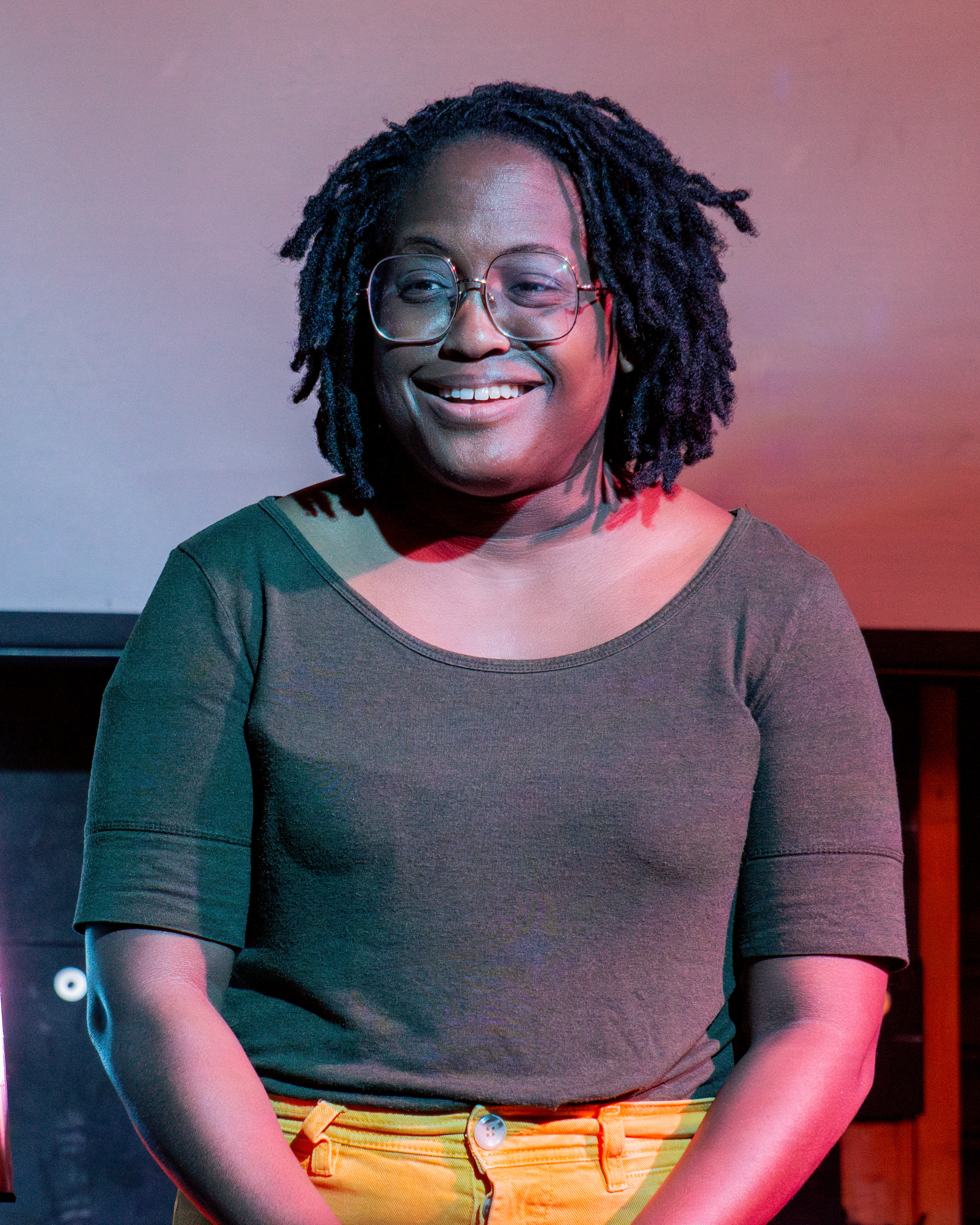
- Mobley at the 2024 Edinburgh Fringe
- Education: North Carolina Central University (B); Boston University
- Occupation: Comedian

Kenice Mobley is an American comedian. She was named to the 2021 Vulture list of Comedians You Should and Will Know. Her debut comedy album Follow Up Question was released in December 2022.

== Life and career ==
Mobley was raised in Charlotte, North Carolina. She received her bachelor's degree in psychology and history from North Carolina Central University. She began her stand-up career at an open mic in Los Angeles and later continued to perform in Boston, while in graduate school for film production at Boston University.

In 2021, Mobley was signed by professional wrestling promotion WWE. However, she was released days later when, during an interview with the Asian not Asian podcast, she pointed out that she got the job without any wrestling knowledge. She was named to Vulture's 2021 list of Comedians You Should and Will Know. Mobley performed a set on The Tonight Show in 2021. Mobley also works for the Center for Media and Social Impact.

Mobley's debut comedy album Follow Up Question, filmed at Union Hall in New York, was released in December 2022. In a positive review, Clare Martin of Paste described the album: "Whether she’s talking about how her mom’s figure has ‘changed the pornography I can watch’ or asking the audience about cum in jars, Mobley mines sophomoric comedic veins in hilarious and surprisingly incisive ways."

She resides in Brooklyn.
