= 2025 New York City Comptroller election =

- November 4, 2025
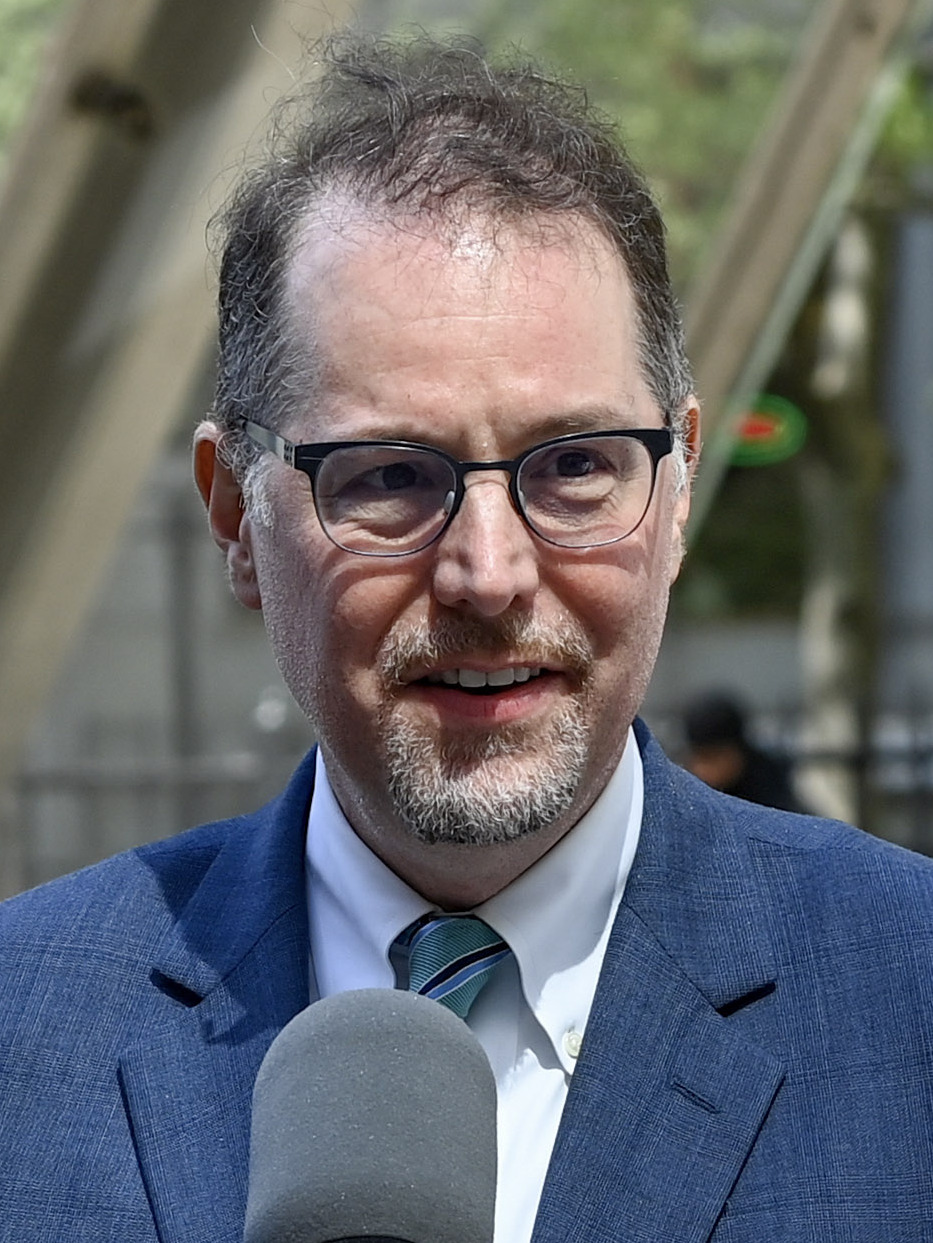

Nominee	Mark Levine	Peter Kefalas
Party	Democratic	Republican
Alliance		Conservative
Popular vote	1,501,467	448,598
Percentage	75.2%	22.5%
- Levine: 40–50% 50–60% 60–70% 70–80% 80–90% >90% Kefalas: 40–50% 50–60% 60–70% 70–80% 80–90% >90% Tie: 40–50% 50% No votes
Comptroller before election
Brad Lander
Democratic
Elected Comptroller
Mark Levine
Democratic

The 2025 New York City Comptroller election was held on November 4, 2025, to elect the comptroller of New York City. Democratic nominee Mark Levine won his first term in office, defeating Republican nominee Peter Kefalas. Levine succeeded Democratic one-term incumbent Brad Lander who ran for mayor of New York City.

== Democratic primary ==
=== Candidates ===
==== Nominee ====
- Mark Levine, Manhattan Borough President (2022–2025)

==== Eliminated in primary ====
- Justin Brannan, City Councilmember from the 47th district (2018–2025)
- Ismael Malave-Perez, civil servant and admin procurement analyst (running as an independent)
- Kevin Parker, state senator from the 21st district (2003–present) and candidate for comptroller in 2021

==== Withdrawn ====
- Jenifer Rajkumar, state assemblymember from the 38th district (2021–present) (ran for public advocate)

==== Declined ====
- Brad Lander, incumbent comptroller (ran for mayor)
- Antonio Reynoso, Brooklyn borough president (2022–present) (ran for re-election; endorsed Levine)

=== Fundraising ===
Campaign finance reports as of June 23, 2025						Independent expenditures as of June 23, 2025	
Candidate	Raised	Public matching funds	Total funds	Spent	Est. Cash on hand	Supporting	Opposing
Justin Brannan	$905,525	$3,038,200	$3,943,725	$2,827,879	$1,115,846	$175,484	$0
Mark Levine	$1,273,203	$3,903,648	$5,176,851	$3,532,791	$1,644,060	$154,798	$0
Ismael Malave-Perez	$104,826	$0 (Note: Did not qualify.)	$104,826	$87,211	$17,615	$0	$0
Kevin Parker	$89,506	$0	$89,506	$77,898	$11,607	$0	$0
Source: New York City Campaign Finance Board

=== Endorsements ===
Justin Brannan

U.S. senators

- Bernie Sanders, U.S. senator from Vermont (2007–present) (Independent)

U.S. representatives

- Charles Rangel, former U.S. representative from New York's 13th congressional district (1971–2017) (second choice) (deceased)
- Max Rose, former U.S. representative from New York's 11th congressional district (2019–2021)
- Nydia Velázquez, U.S. representative from New York's 7th congressional district (1993–present)

State legislators

- Peter Abbate Jr., former state assemblymember from the 49th district (1987–2022)
- Khaleel Anderson, state assemblymember from the 31st district (2020–present) (first choice)
- Jabari Brisport, state senator from the 25th district (2021–present)
- Robert Carroll, state assemblymember from the 44th district (2017–present)
- Iwen Chu, former state senator from the 26th district (2023–2024)
- Cordell Cleare, state senator from the 30th district (2021–present) (second choice)
- Leroy Comrie, state senator from the 14th district (2015–present)
- Inez Dickens, former state assemblymember from the 70th district (2017–2025) (second choice)
- Phara Souffrant Forrest, state assemblymember from the 57th district (2021–present)
- Emily Gallagher, state assemblymember from the 50th district (2021–present)
- Eddie Gibbs, state assemblymember from the 68th district (2022–present) (second choice)
- Andrew Gounardes, state senator from the 26th district (2019–present)
- Carl Heastie, Speaker of the New York State Assembly (2015–present) from the 83rd district (2001–present)
- Larinda Hooks, state assemblymember from the 35th district (2025–present)
- Alicia Hyndman, state assemblymember from the 29th district (2016–present)
- Robert Jackson, state senator from the 31st district (2019–present) (previously endorsed Parker first and Levine third)
- Zohran Mamdani, state assemblymember from the 36th district (2021–2025)
- Joan Millman, former state assemblymember from the 52nd district (1997–2014)
- Yuh-Line Niou, former state assemblymember from the 52nd district (2017–2022)
- Gustavo Rivera, state senator from the 33rd district (2011–present)
- Julia Salazar, state senator from the 18th district (2019–present)
- James Sanders Jr., state senator from the 10th district (2013–present)
- Jo Anne Simon, state assemblymember from the 52nd district (2015–present)
- Al Taylor, Assistant Speaker Pro Tempore of the New York State Assembly (2023–present) from the 71st district (2017–present) (second choice)
- Claire Valdez, state assemblymember from the 37th district (2025–present)
- Clyde Vanel, state assemblymember from the 33rd district (2017–present)
- Jordan Wright, state assemblymember from the 70th district (2025–present) (second choice)

Local officials

- Alexa Avilés, city councilmember from the 38th district (2021–present)
- Selvena Brooks-Powers, Majority Whip of the New York City Council (2022–present) from the 31st district (2021–present)
- Tiffany Cabán, city councilmember from the 22nd district (2021–present)
- Amanda Farías, Majority Leader of the New York City Council (2024–present) from the 18th district (2022–present)
- ~~James Gennaro, city councilmember from the 24th district (2002–2013, 2021–present)~~
- Jennifer Gutiérrez, city councilmember from the 34th district (2022–present)
- Kamillah Hanks, city councilmember from the 49th district (2022–present)
- Marty Markowitz, former Brooklyn borough president (2002–2013)
- Sandy Nurse, city councilmember from the 37th district (2022–present)
- Lincoln Restler, city councilmember from the 33rd district (2022–present)
- Kevin Riley, city councilmember from the 12th district (2021–present)
- Yusef Salaam, city councilmember from the 9th district (2024–present)
- Althea Stevens, city councilmember from the 16th district (2022–present)
- Jumaane Williams, New York City Public Advocate (2019–present) (first choice)
- Nantasha Williams, city councilmember from the 27th district (2021–present)

Party officials

- Keith Wright, chair of the Manhattan Democratic Party (2009–present) (previously endorsed Parker first and Levine third)

Individuals

- Ana Maria Archila, activist and co-director of the New York Working Families Party
- John Avlon, journalist and board chair of Citizens Union (first choice)

Labor unions

- Council of School Supervisors & Administrators
- Hotel and Gaming Trades Council
- Marine Engineers' Beneficial Association
- New York State Nurses Association
- Professional Staff Congress
- SEIU 32BJ
- Teamsters Locals 804 and 831
- Transport Workers Union of America
- Uniformed Firefighters Association
- United Auto Workers Region 9A

Organizations

- Bay Ridge Democrats
- Brooklyn Young Democrats
- Central Brooklyn Independent Democrats
- Chelsea Reform Democratic Club
- Citizen Action of New York
- Citizens Union (first choice)
- Downtown Independent Democrats
- Independent Neighborhood Democrats (first choice)
- Jews for Racial and Economic Justice
- Lambda Independent Democrats of Brooklyn
- New Kings Democrats
- New York Communities for Change
- Three Bridges Democratic Club
- Village Reform Democratic Club
- Working Families Party
Mark Levine

U.S. representatives

- Adriano Espaillat, U.S. representative from New York's 13th congressional district (2017–present)
- Dan Goldman, U.S. representative from New York's 10th congressional district (2023–present)
- Elizabeth Holtzman, former New York City Comptroller (1990–1993) and former U.S. representative from New York's 16th congressional district (1973–1981)
- Jerry Nadler, U.S. representative from New York's 12th congressional district (1993–present)
- Charles Rangel, former U.S. representative from New York's 13th congressional district (1971–2017) (third choice) (deceased)
- Ritchie Torres, U.S. representative from New York's 15th congressional district (2021–present)

State legislators

- George Alvarez, state assemblymember from the 78th district (2023–present)
- Khaleel Anderson, state assemblymember from the 31st district (2020–present) (second choice)
- Michael Benedetto, state assemblymember from the 82nd district (2005–present)
- Sam Berger, state assemblymember from the 27th district (2023–present)
- Edward Braunstein, state assemblymember from the 26th district (2011–present)
- Alex Bores, state assemblymember from the 73rd district (2023–present)
- Cordell Cleare, state senator from the 30th district (2021–present) (third choice)
- William Colton, state assemblymember from the 47th district (1997–present)
- Vivian Cook, Assistant Speaker of the New York State Assembly (2023–present) from the 32nd district (1991–present)
- Brian Cunningham, state assemblymember from the 43rd district (2022–present)
- Maritza Davila, state assemblymember from the 53rd district (2013–present)
- Manny De Los Santos, state assemblymember from the 72nd district (2022–present)
- Inez Dickens, former state assemblymember from the 70th district (2017–2025) (third choice)
- Erik Dilan, state assemblymember from the 54th district (2015–present)
- Jeffrey Dinowitz, state assemblymember from the 81st district (1994–present)
- Harvey Epstein, state assemblymember from the 74th district (2018–present)
- Eddie Gibbs, state assemblymember from the 68th district (2022–present) (third choice)
- Deborah Glick, state assemblymember from the 66th district (1991–present)
- Kristen Gonzalez, state senator from the 59th district (2023–present)
- Larinda Hooks, state assemblymember from the 35th district (2025–present)
- Brad Hoylman-Sigal, state senator from the 47th district (2013–present)
- Alicia Hyndman, state assemblymember from the 29th district (2016–present)
- ~~Robert Jackson, state senator from the 31st district (2019–present) (third choice)~~ (switched to solely endorsing Brannan)
- Micah Lasher, state assemblymember from the 69th district (2025–present)
- Grace Lee, state assemblymember from the 65th district (2023–present)
- Stacey Pheffer Amato, state assemblymember from the 23rd district (2017–present)
- Karines Reyes, state assemblymember from the 87th district (2019–present)
- Linda Rosenthal, state assemblymember from the 67th district (2006–present)
- Nily Rozic, state assemblymember from the 25th district (2013–present)
- Rebecca Seawright, state assemblymember from the 76th district (2015–present)
- Tony Simone, state assemblymember from the 75th district (2023–present)
- Yudelka Tapia, state assemblymember from the 86th district (2021–present)
- Al Taylor, Assistant Speaker Pro Tempore of the New York State Assembly (2023–present) from the 71st district (2017–present) (third choice)
- Clyde Vanel, state assemblymember from the 33rd district (2017–present)
- Latrice Walker, state assemblymember from the 55th district (2015–present)
- David Weprin, state assemblymember from the 24th district (2010–present)
- Jordan Wright, state assemblymember from the 70th district (2025–present) (third choice)

Local officials

- Shaun Abreu, city councilmember from the 7th district (2022–present)
- Erik Bottcher, city councilmember from the 3rd district (2022–present)
- Carmen De La Rosa, city councilmember from the 10th district (2022–present)
- Eric Dinowitz, city councilmember from the 11th district (2021–present)
- Oswald Feliz, city councilmember from the 15th district (2021–present)
- Vanessa Gibson, Bronx Borough President (2022–present)
- Rita Joseph, city councilmember from the 40th district (2022–present)
- Shekar Krishnan, city councilmember from the 25th district (2022–present)
- Linda Lee, city councilmember from the 23rd district (2022–present)
- Daneek Miller, former city councilmember from the 27th district (2014–2021)
- Keith Powers, former Majority Leader of the New York City Council (2022–2024) from the 4th district (2018–present)
- Antonio Reynoso, Brooklyn Borough President (2022–present)
- Donovan Richards, Queens Borough President (2020–present)
- ~~Yusef Salaam, city councilmember from the 9th district (2024–present) (third choice)~~ (switched to solely endorsing Brannan)
- Jumaane Williams, New York City Public Advocate (2019–present) (second choice)
- Julie Won, city councilmember from the 26th district (2022–present)
- Susan Zhuang, city councilmember from the 43rd district (2024–present)

Party officials

- ~~Keith Wright, chair of the Manhattan Democratic Party (2009–present) (third choice)~~ (switched to solely endorsing Brannan)

Individuals

- John Avlon, journalist and board chair of Citizens Union (second choice)

Labor unions

- 1199SEIU United Healthcare Workers East
- American Federation of Musicians Local 802
- Association of Theatrical Press Agents & Managers
- Building and Construction Trades Council of Greater New York
- Civil Service Employees Association
- Communications Workers of America District 1
- District Council 37
- LiUNA! New York
- 6 International Alliance of Theatrical Stage Employees Locals (Note: Locals 1, 52, 306, 751, 764, and 798)
- International Brotherhood of Electrical Workers Local 3
- International Union of Painters and Allied Trades District Council 9
- Office and Professional Employees International Union Local 153
- Retail, Wholesale and Department Store Union
- Sheet Metal Workers Local 28
- Teamsters Local 817
- Uniformed Fire Officers Association
- UNITE HERE Local 100
- United Association Plumbers Local 1
- United Scenic Artists
- Utility Workers Union of America Local 1-2

Organizations

- Broadway Democrats
- Citizens Union (second choice)
- Eleanor Roosevelt Independent Democrats
- Four Freedoms Democratic Club
- Grand Street Democrats
- Hell's Kitchen Democrats
- Independent Neighborhood Democrats (second choice)
- Jim Owles Liberal Democratic Club
- Lexington Democratic Club
- Mayersohn-Simanowitz Democratic Club
- New York League of Conservation Voters
- New Yorkers for Clean, Livable, and Safe Streets
- Stonewall Democratic Club of New York
- Three Parks Independent Democrats
- Village Independent Democrats
Kevin Parker

U.S. representatives

- Charles Rangel, former U.S. representative from New York's 13th congressional district (1971–2017) (first choice) (deceased)

State legislators

- Cordell Cleare, state senator from the 30th district (2021–present) (first choice)
- Inez Dickens, former state assemblymember from the 70th district (2017–2025) (first choice)
- Eddie Gibbs, state assemblymember from the 68th district (2022–present) (first choice)
- ~~Robert Jackson, state senator from the 31st district (2019–present) (first choice)~~ (switched to solely endorsing Brannan)
- Al Taylor, Assistant Speaker Pro Tempore of the New York State Assembly (2023–present) from the 71st district (2017–present) (first choice)
- Jordan Wright, state assemblymember from the 70th district (2025–present) (first choice)

Local officials

- ~~Yusef Salaam, city councilmember from the 9th district (2024–present) (first choice)~~ (switched to solely endorsing Brannan)
- Jumaane Williams, New York City Public Advocate (2019–present) (third choice)

Party officials

- ~~Keith Wright, chair of the Manhattan Democratic Party (2009–present) (first choice)~~ (switched to solely endorsing Brannan)
Ismael Malave-Perez

State legislators

- Adam Clayton Powell IV, state assemblymember from the 68th district (2001–2010)

Local officials

- Rubén Díaz Jr., former Bronx Borough President (2009–2021) (endorsed Levine in the general election)

Organizations

- Solidarity PAC
Declined to endorse

State legislators

- Kalman Yeger, state assemblymember from the 41st district (2025–present)

=== Polling ===
==== Ranked-choice polls ====
Poll source	Date(s) administered	Sample size (Note: Key: A – all adults RV – registered voters LV – likely voters V – unclear)	Margin of error	RCV count	Justin Brannan	Mark Levine	Ismael Malave-Perez	Kevin Parker	Undecided
Emerson College (Note: This poll was sponsored by WPIX and The Hill)	May 23–26, 2025	573 (LV)	± 3.9%	BA	17%	37%	7%	12%	29%
Emerson College	May 23–26, 2025	409 (LV)	± 3.9%	1	23%	51%	10%	16%	–
Emerson College	May 23–26, 2025	403 (LV)	± 3.9%	2	27%	55%	–	19%	–
Emerson College	May 23–26, 2025	375 (LV)	± 3.9%	3	37%	63%	–	–	–

==== First-past-the-post polls ====
Poll source	Date(s) administered	Sample size	Margin of error	Justin Brannan	Mark Levine	Ismael Malave-Perez	Kevin Parker	Undecided
Center for Strategic Politics (Note: This poll was sponsored by DREAM for NYC)	June 13–16, 2025	580 (LV)	± 4.1%	17%	41%	12%	7%	23%
Public Policy Polling (D) (Note: This poll was sponsored by Brannan's campaign) (Note: First-choice results from a ranked-choice poll)	June 6–7, 2025	573 (LV)	± 4.1%	19%	30%	1%	6%	44%
Emerson College	May 23–26, 2025	573 (LV)	± 3.9%	17%	37%	7%	12%	29%
Honan Strategy Group (Note: This poll was sponsored by the Greater New York Chamber of Commerce)	April 16–17, 2025	823 (LV)	± 3.4%	10%	25%	–	5%	60%

==== Other polls ====
Poll source	Date(s) administered	Sample size	Margin of error	RCV count	Justin Brannan	Mark Levine	Ismael Malave-Perez	Kevin Parker	Undecided
Public Policy Polling (D) (Note: This poll asked respondents to name their first and second choices on their ballots, but did not eliminate candidates in a ranked-choice simulation.)	June 6–7, 2025	573 (LV)	± 4.1%	1	19%	30%	1%	6%	44%
Public Policy Polling (D)	June 6–7, 2025	573 (LV)	± 4.1%	2	7%	9%	3%	6%	74%

=== Results ===
First round

Second round

Third round

Levine

30–40%
40–50%
50–60%
60–70%
70–80%
80–90%
90–100%

Brannan

20–30%
30–40%
40–50%
50–60%
60–70%
70–80%
80–90%
90–100%

Malave-Perez

20–30%
30–40%
40–50%
50–60%
90–100%

Parker

30–40%
40–50%
50–60%
60–70%

Tie

20-30%
30–40%
40–50%
50%

Other

No votes

Democratic primary results
Party	Candidate	First round		Second round		Final round	
Party	Candidate	Votes	%	Votes	%	Votes	%
Democratic	Mark D. Levine	444,067	47.98%	444,482	48.14%	491,551	58.72%
Democratic	Justin Brannan	308,637	33.35%	308,837	33.45%	345,628	41.28%
Democratic	Ismael Malave-Perez	96,049	10.38%	96,259	10.43%	—N/a	
Democratic	Kevin Parker	73,322	7.92%	73,677	7.98%	—N/a	
Democratic	Write-ins	3,475	0.38%	—N/a		—N/a	
Total active votes		925,550	100.00%	923,255	100.00%	837,179	100.00%
Exhausted ballots		—N/a		2,295	0.25%	86,076	9.32%

== Republican primary ==
=== Candidates ===
==== Nominee ====
- Peter Kefalas, founder of media site QNS Voice

==== Eliminated in primary ====
- Danniel Maio, data analyst and perennial candidate

=== Endorsements ===
Peter Kefalas

Local officials

- Joann Ariola, minority leader of the New York City Council (2025–present) from the 32nd district (2022–present)

Individuals

- Curtis Sliwa, founder of the Guardian Angels and Republican nominee for mayor in 2021 and 2025

Organizations

- Log Cabin Republicans of New York City

Party chapters

- Queens Republican Party

Political parties

- Conservative Party

=== Results ===

Kefalas

40–50%
50–60%
60–70%
70–80%
80–90%
90–100%

Maio

40–50%
50–60%
60–70%
70–80%
80–90%
90–100%

Write-ins

40–50%
50–60%
60–70%
70–80%
90–100%

Tie

30–40%
40–50%
50%

Other

No votes

Republican primary results
Party	Candidate	Votes	%
Republican	Peter Kefalas	18,112	60.9%
Republican	Danniel Maio	9,870	33.2%
Write-in		1,740	5.9%
Total votes		29,722	100%

== General election ==
=== Post-primary endorsements ===
Mark Levine

Local officials

- Rubén Díaz Jr., former Bronx Borough President (2009–2021) (endorsed Malave-Perez in the primary)
Peter Kefalas

State legislators

- Michael Tannousis, state assemblymember from the 64th district (2021–present) and chair of the Staten Island Republican Party
Ismael Malave-Perez

Organizations

- Solidarity PAC

=== Results ===
2025 New York City Comptroller election
Party	Candidate	Votes	%	±%
Democratic	Mark Levine	1,501,467	75.19%	+5.63%
Republican	Peter Kefalas	402,587	20.16%	−2.49%
Conservative	Peter Kefalas	46,011	2.30%	−3.18%
Total	Peter Kefalas	448,598	22.47%	N/A
The Unity	Ismael Malave-Perez	42,670	2.14%	N/A
Write-in		4,084	0.20%	+0.02%
Total votes		1,996,819	100%	
Democratic hold				

== Notes ==
Partisan clients
