= 2025 New York City Public Advocate election =

- November 4, 2025
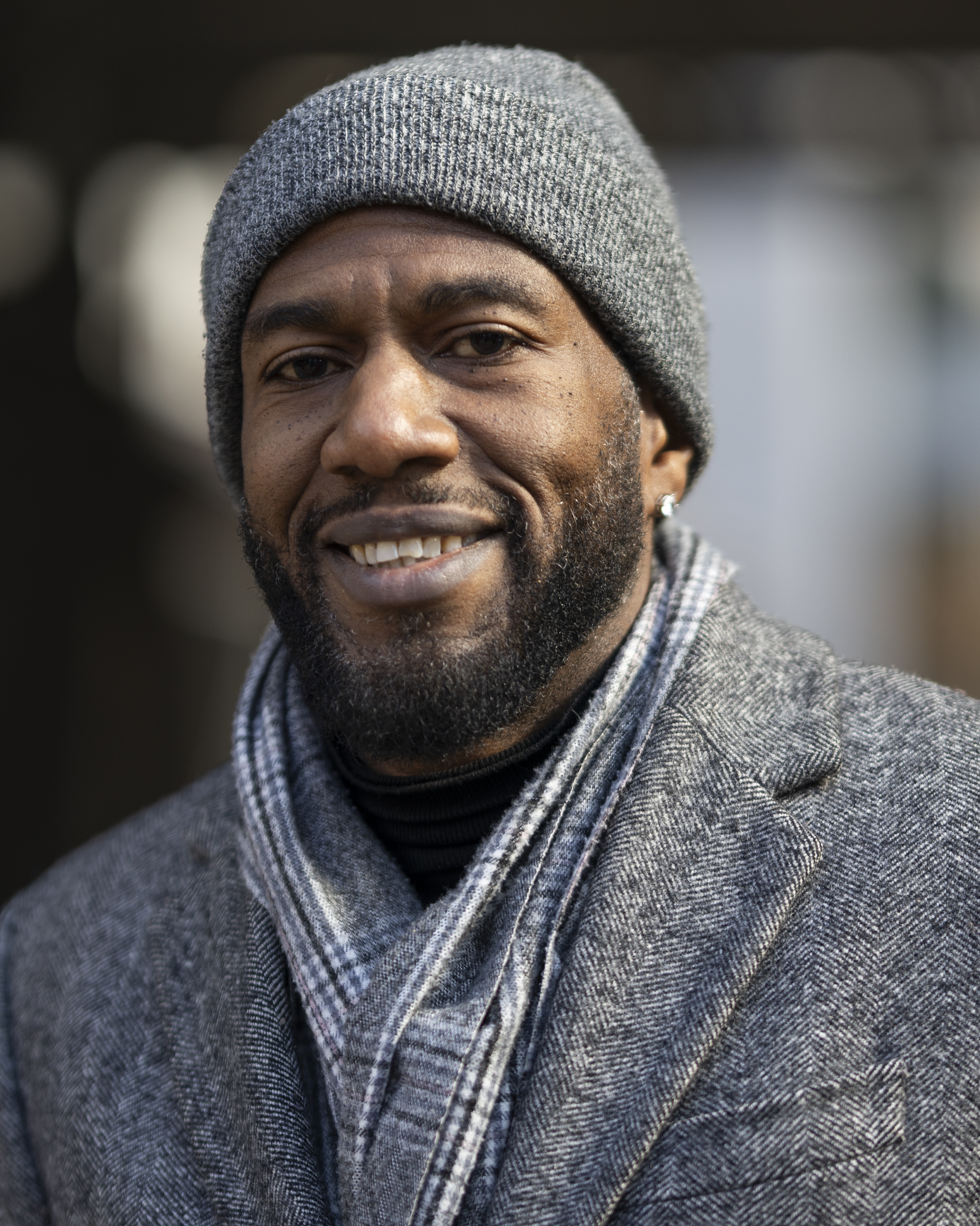

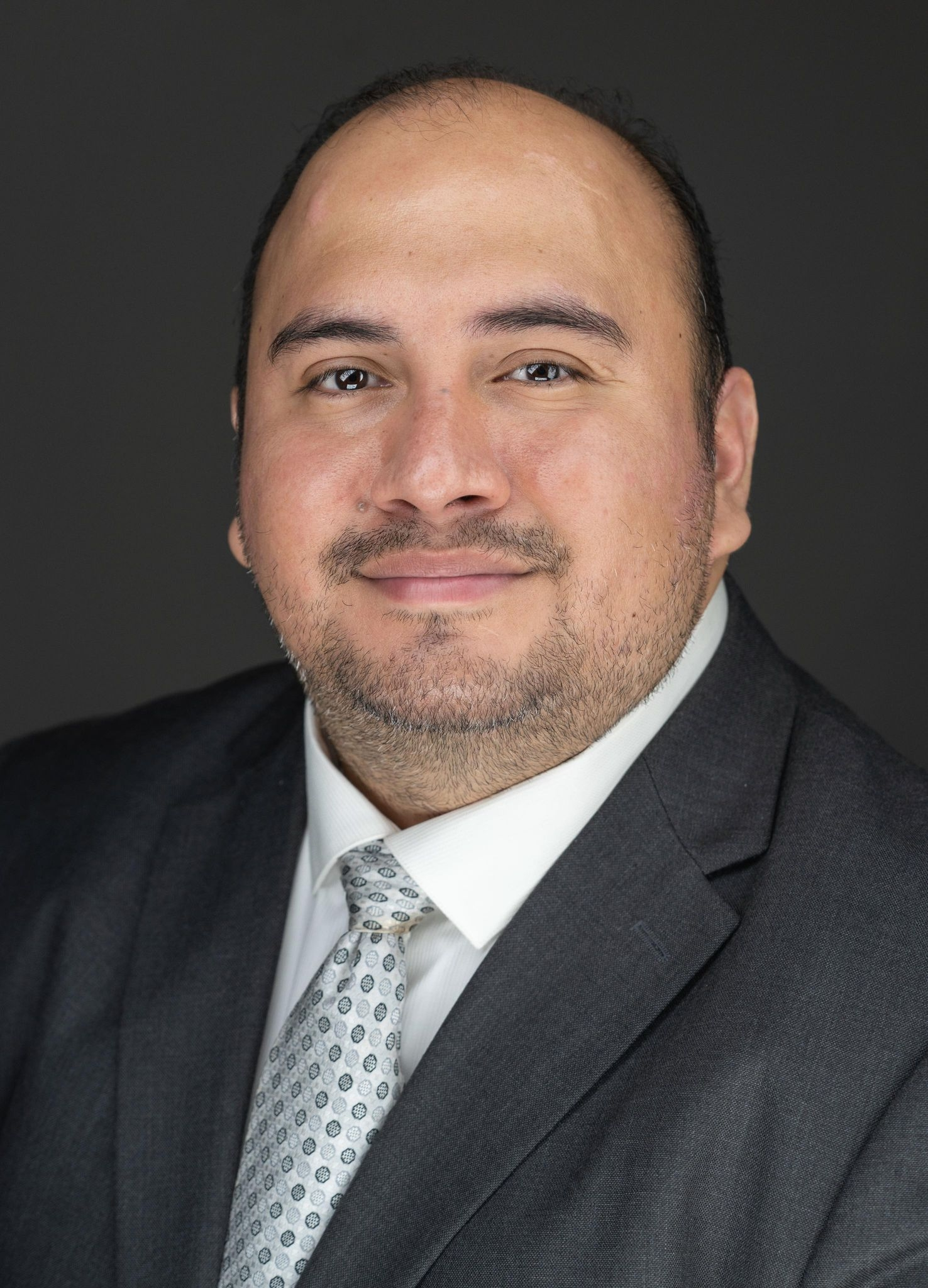
Nominee	Jumaane Williams	Gonzalo Duran
Party	Democratic	Conservative
Alliance	Working Families	Republican
Popular vote	1,362,196	465,113
Percentage	72.9%	24.9%
- Williams: 40–50% 50–60% 60–70% 70–80% 80–90% >90% Duran: 40–50% 50–60% 60–70% 70–80% 80–90% >90% Tie: 40–50% 50% No votes
Public Advocate before election
Jumaane Williams
Democratic
Elected Public Advocate
Jumaane Williams
Democratic

The 2025 New York City Public Advocate election was held on November 4, 2025. Incumbent New York City Public Advocate Jumaane Williams was reelected to a second term.

== Democratic primary ==
=== Candidates ===
==== Nominee ====
- Jumaane Williams, incumbent public advocate

==== Eliminated in primary ====
- Marty Dolan, financial advisor and candidate for New York's 14th congressional district in 2024
- Jenifer Rajkumar, state assemblymember from the 38th district (2021–present) (previously ran for comptroller)

==== Withdrawn ====
- Calvin Sun, physician (ran for Manhattan Borough President)
- Christian Matthew, pastor and gun violence advocate

=== Fundraising ===
Campaign finance reports as of June 23, 2025						Independent expenditures as of June 23, 2025	
Candidate	Raised	Public matching funds	Total funds	Spent	Est. Cash on hand	Supporting	Opposing
Marty Dolan	$54,984	$0 (Note: Did not qualify.)	$54,984	$70,126	$-15,142 (Note: Dolan further owes $23,558 in outstanding loans.)	$0	$0
Jenifer Rajkumar	$477,103	$1,577,680	$2,054,783	$1,411,360	$643,424	$127,339	$0
Jumaane Williams	$366,149	$1,280,072	$1,646,221	$1,223,582	$422,639	$257,485	$0
Source: New York City Campaign Finance Board

=== Endorsements ===
Jenifer Rajkumar

U.S. representatives

- Ro Khanna, U.S. representative from California's 17th congressional district (2017–present)
- Shri Thanedar, U.S. representative from Michigan's 13th congressional district (2023–present)

State legislators

- Joseph Addabbo Jr., state senator from the 15th district (2009–present)
- Michael Benedetto, state assemblymember from the 82nd district (2005–present)
- Sam Berger, state assemblymember from the 27th district (2023–present)
- Erik Dilan, state assemblymember from the 54th district (2015–present)
- Nily Rozic, state assemblymember from the 25th district (2013–present)
- Toby Ann Stavisky, state senator from Queens
- David Weprin, state assemblymember from the 24th district (2010–present)

Local officials

- Robert Holden, city councilmember from the 30th district (2018–present)

Labor unions

- Police Benevolent Association of the City of New York

Newspapers

- The Jewish Voice
Jumaane Williams

U.S. representatives

- Yvette Clarke, U.S. representative from New York's 9th congressional district (2007–present)
- Alexandria Ocasio-Cortez, U.S. representative from New York's 14th congressional district (2019–present)
- Charles Rangel, former U.S. representative from New York's 13th congressional district (1971–2017) (deceased)
- Nydia Velázquez, U.S. representative from New York's 7th congressional district (1993–present)

State legislators

- Khaleel Anderson, state assemblymember from the 31st district (2020–present)
- Cordell Cleare, state senator from the 30th district (2021–present)
- Leroy Comrie, state senator from the 14th district (2015–present)
- Inez Dickens, former state assemblymember from the 70th district (2017–2025)
- Michael Gianaris, state senator from the 12th district (2011–present)
- Eddie Gibbs, state assemblymember from the 68th district (2022–present)
- Kristen Gonzalez, state senator from the 59th district (2023–present)
- Jessica González-Rojas, state senator from the 34th district (2021–present)
- Andrew Hevesi, state assemblymember from the 28th district (2005–present)
- Larinda Hooks, state assemblymember from the 35th district (2025–present)
- Alicia Hyndman, state assemblymember from the 29th district (2016–present)
- Robert Jackson, state senator from the 31st district (2019–present)
- John Liu, state senator from the 16th district (2019–present)
- James Sanders Jr., state senator from the 10th district (2013–present)
- Al Taylor, Assistant Speaker Pro Tempore of the New York State Assembly (2023–present) from the 71st district (2017–present)
- Clyde Vanel, state assemblymember from the 33rd district (2017–present)
- Jordan Wright, state assemblymember from the 70th district (2025–present)

Local officials

- Adrienne Adams, Speaker of the New York City Council (2022–present) from the 28th district (2017–present)
- Selvena Brooks-Powers, Majority Whip of the New York City Council (2022–present) from the 31st district (2021–present)
- Vanessa Gibson, Borough President of The Bronx (2022-present)
- Donovan Richards, Borough President of Queens (2020–present)
- Yusef Salaam, city councilmember from the 9th district (2024–present)
- Nantasha Williams, city councilmember from the 27th district (2021–present)
- Julie Won, city councilmember from the 26th district (2022–present)

Party officials

- Keith Wright, chair of the Manhattan Democratic Party (2009–present)

Individuals

- Ana Maria Archila, activist and co-director of the New York Working Families Party

Labor unions

- 1199SEIU United Healthcare Workers East
- Actors' Equity Association
- Communications Workers of America District 1
- Communications Workers of America Local 1180
- District Council 37
- New York City Central Labor Council
- NYC District Council of Carpenters
- New York State Nurses Association
- Professional Staff Congress
- United Federation of Teachers

Organizations

- Brooklyn Young Democrats
- Council of School Supervisors & Administrators
- Indivisible Brooklyn
- Jews for Racial and Economic Justice
- Jim Owles Liberal Democratic Club
- Lambda Independent Democrats of Brooklyn
- Make the Road Action
- New York City Council Progressive Caucus Alliance
- New York League of Conservation Voters
- Stonewall Democratic Club of New York
- Sunrise Movement NYC
- Working Families Party

Newspapers

- Washington Square News

=== Polling ===
==== First-past-the-post polls ====
Poll source	Date(s) administered	Sample size (Note: Key: A – all adults RV – registered voters LV – likely voters V – unclear)	Margin of error	Marty Dolan	Jenifer Rajkumar	Jumaane Williams	Other	Undecided
Center for Strategic Politics (Note: This poll was sponsored by DREAM for NYC)	June 13–16, 2025	580 (LV)	± 4.1%	14%	12%	54%	–	20%
Emerson College (Note: This poll was sponsored by WPIX and The Hill)	May 23–26, 2025	541 (LV)	± 3.9%	13%	15%	56%	–	16%
Honan Strategy Group (Note: This poll was sponsored by the Greater New York Chamber of Commerce)	April 16–17, 2025	823 (LV)	± 3.4%	6%	6%	51%	4%	32%

=== Debates ===
2025 New York City Public Advocate Democratic primary election debate
No.	Date	Host	Moderator	Link	Democratic	Democratic	Democratic
Key: P Participant A Absent N Not invited I Invited W Withdrawn							
Key: P Participant A Absent N Not invited I Invited W Withdrawn					Dolan	Rajkumar	Williams
1	June 5, 2025	PIX11	Dan Mannarino; Henry Rosoff		N	P	P

=== Results ===

Williams

30–40%
40–50%
50–60%
60–70%
70–80%
80–90%
90–100%

Rajkumar

30–40%
40–50%
50–60%
60–70%
70–80%
80–90%
90–100%

Dolan

30–40%
40–50%
50–60%
60–70%
90–100%

Write-in

90–100%

Tie

30–40%
40–50%
50%

Other

No votes

Democratic primary results
Party	Candidate	Votes	%
Democratic	Jumaane Williams (incumbent)	681,605	71.2
Democratic	Jenifer Rajkumar	179,439	18.8
Democratic	Marty Dolan	89,941	9.4
Write-in		5,983	0.6
Total votes		956,968	100

== Republican primary ==
=== Candidates ===
==== Nominee ====
- Gonzalo Duran, vice chair of the Bronx Conservative Party and nominee for New York's 15th congressional district in 2024 (previously ran for mayor)

=== Endorsements ===
Gonzalo Duran

Organizations

- Bronx Republican Party
- Bronx Conservative Party
- New York Young Republican Club

Individuals

- Marty Dolan, public advocate candidate (cross-endorsement)

== Third parties and independents ==
=== Working Families Party ===
==== Nominee ====
- Jumaane Williams, incumbent public advocate

=== Independents ===
==== Declared ====
- Marty Dolan, financial advisor and candidate for New York's 14th congressional district in 2024 (Note: Dolan contested the Democratic primary, finishing 3rd behind Williams and Rajkumar. He chose to run as an independent on the ballot line 'The Unity')

== General election ==
=== Results ===
2025 New York City Public Advocate election
Party	Candidate	Votes	%	±%
Democratic	Jumaane Williams	1,225,272	61.2	
Working Families	Jumaane Williams	233,576	11.7	
Total	Jumaane Williams (incumbent)	1,458,848	72.9	
Republican	Gonzalo Duran	440,936	22.1	
Conservative	Gonzalo Duran (Note: Ballot line will officially appear as 'Conservative/United Alliance'.)	49,367	2.4	
Total	Gonzalo Duran	490,303	24.5	
The Unity	Marty Dolan	45,685	2.3	
Write-in		6,731	0.3	
Total votes		1,998,568	100%	
Democratic hold				

== Notes ==
Partisan clients
