= 2026 New York's 13th congressional district election =

- November 3, 2026

New York's 13th congressional district
- Turnout: 38.3% ▼
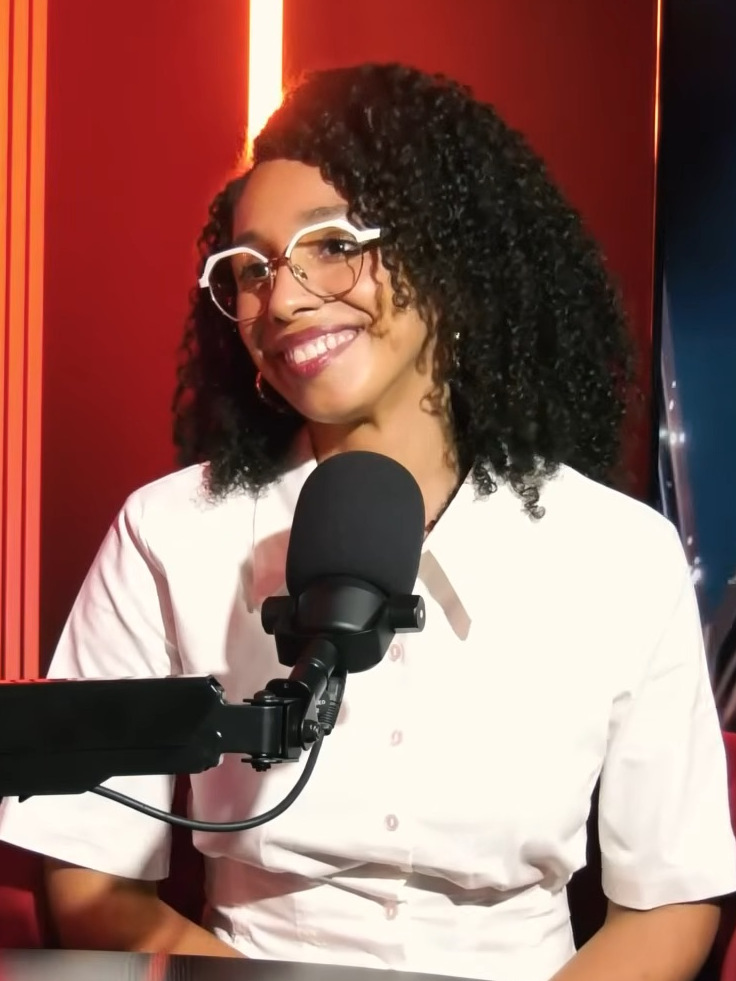

Nominee	Darializa Avila Chevalier	Jomo M. Williams
Party	Democratic	Republican
Alliance	Working Families
Popular vote	141,014	18,308
Percentage	87.5%	11.4%
U.S. representative before election
Adriano Espaillat
Democratic
Elected U.S. representative
Darializa Avila Chevalier
Democratic

An election was held on November 3, 2026, to elect the United States representative for New York's 13th congressional district, concurrently with other elections to the House of Representatives, elections to the Senate, and various state and local elections. The primary election took place on June 23, 2026. The 13th district is a deeply blue urban district based in Upper Manhattan and the Northwest Bronx, including the neighborhoods of Harlem, Morningside Heights, Spanish Harlem, Hamilton Heights, Washington Heights, Inwood, Marble Hill, Fordham, Kingsbridge, and Bedford Park.

The incumbent was Democrat Adriano Espaillat, who was first elected in 2016, re-elected with 83.5% of the vote in 2024, and was defeated in the Democratic primary by Darializa Avila Chevalier. The primary received national attention as a fight between the Democratic Party's mainstream wing and the party's democratic socialist wing.

== Democratic primary ==
=== Background ===
Adriano Espaillat has served as U.S. representative for the 13th district since 2016, and had since then built a formidable political machine known as the 'Squadriano', leveraging his popularity among the Dominican-American community to elect allies across Upper Manhattan and the Bronx. Espaillat also had a prominent national reputation, serving as chair of the Congressional Hispanic Caucus, and was in good standing among national Democrats. However, observers such as Michael Lange noted that his position was more vulnerable than it appeared, as the congressman had made many powerful enemies over his time in office.

Most prominently, Espaillat had first won NY-13 only after a series of hard-fought primaries, losing twice to Charles Rangel in 2012 and 2014 before finally winning in 2016, narrowly defeating Keith L.T. Wright in a bitter contest that saw accusations of voter suppression from both men. These primaries had severely strained Espaillat's relations with the African-American and Puerto Rican political machine based out of Harlem; Wright remained the chair of the Manhattan Democratic Party and in 2025 attempted to have Espaillat and three of his allies expelled as district leaders over charges of voter fraud.

In addition, after a series of victories for his preferred candidates from 2016 to 2021, Espaillat had ambitiously attempted to unseat two incumbent state senators in the 2022 election cycle. He had backed moderate primary challengers to Robert Jackson and Gustavo Rivera, two darlings of New York City's populist left, and had failed to defeat either. Despite his membership in the Congressional Progressive Caucus and left-wing national voting record, Espaillat's relationships with New York City progressive organizations were already strained by his acceptance of money from organisations such as the American Israel Public Affairs Committee (AIPAC), and these primary attempts strengthened a feeling among these groups that he was an enemy.

==== Detention of Mahmoud Khalil ====
The event that immediately preceded Espaillat receiving a primary challenge was the 2025 detention and attempted deportation of Mahmoud Khalil, a high-profile pro-Palestine activist who was a student at Columbia University and a resident of NY-13. Khalil's wife had attempted to reach out to Espaillat for legal assistance, but was ignored by the congressman even as his detention became a national progressive cause célèbre and neighbouring representatives such as Alexandria Ocasio-Cortez and Nydia Velázquez successfully pushed for his release. Espaillat's lack of support for Khalil led to charges that he was abandoning his constituents, and greatly increased the salience of previous critiques he had faced from progressive groups for accepting donations from pro-Israel groups such as AIPAC.

Espaillat's lack of attention to the Khalil case led one of his fellow organisers at the Columbia University Gaza Solidarity Encampment, graduate student Darializa Avila Chevalier, to approach the left-wing group Justice Democrats to argue that the incumbent was vulnerable to a primary challenge from the left. A member of the New York City Democratic Socialists of America (NYC-DSA), Avila Chevalier had been NY-13 field lead for Zohran Mamdani in the 2025 New York City mayoral election. She was also friends with Khalil, and viewed Espaillat's lack of action on his detention as part of a broader trend of poor constituent services by the incumbent. The Justice Democrats responded by recruiting Avila Chevalier to run herself, and she announced her campaign in November 2025.

=== Campaign ===
==== Contest for endorsements ====
Espaillat's position as chair of the Congressional Hispanic Caucus immediately gave him extensive resources to try and beat back the primary challenge, and the caucus spent heavily to support him. In addition the Congressional Black Caucus, which had long rebuffed the Afro-Latino Espaillat's attempt to join over anger at his old primary contests with Rangel and Wright, gave him their endorsement, and the incumbent's membership in the Congressional Progressive Caucus granted him their support as well, locking down a group that was potentially sympathetic to Chevalier. Espaillat was also supported by his long-time backers AIPAC, which directly spent $145,000 in support of him and had associated donors give significantly more.

Espaillat also feverishly worked to mend his ties with the Harlem machine, appealing to a shared interest in opposing the growing wave of left-wing insurgents that threatened to unseat both them and himself. In a June 2026 event Espaillat was endorsed by a wide coalition of African-American figures, including his old foe Keith Wright's son Jordan Wright, but the Manhattan boss himself was conspicuously absent. Analyst Michael Lange noted that despite these endorsements genuine enthusiasm for Espaillat was thin on the ground among Harlem elected officials, and that a lack of vigorous support would likely compound a longtime weakness the incumbent had in the area; while facing a low-profile primary challenge in 2020 Espaillat had only just surpassed 50% of the vote in Harlem.

Avila Chevalier, for her part, won the endorsement of NYC-DSA itself on December 20, 2025, but this endorsement did not immediately win her the support of newly elected mayor of New York Zohran Mamdani. Mamdani had already helped scupper two NYC-DSA congressional challengers that cycle, and was reluctant to back Chevalier after promising to endorse Espaillat in return for the incumbent's support in the 2025 mayoral general election. However, the mayor's mind was changed after Chevalier posted surprisingly strong fundraising numbers in the first quarter of 2026, NYC-DSA's support allowing her to outraise Espaillat $270,000 to $230,000. Mamdani announced his endorsement of Avila Chevalier in a joint interview on MS NOW on May 25, 2026. Avila Chevalier became the third congressional candidate that cycle backed by Mamdani alongside Brad Lander and Claire Valdez.

Avila Chevalier's increased prominence led to her receiving more support from outside groups; American Priorities, a pro-Palestine super PAC established to oppose AIPAC, spent $1.3 million to support her. She also received the support of some of Espaillat's old political rivals; Robert Jackson, eager for payback over Espaillat's attempt to primary him in 2022, endorsed her and rallied his Hudson Heights base to her side, whereas Gustavo Rivera remained neutral but publicly accused Espaillat's supporters of engaging in racist "great replacement" conspiracy theories over Avila Chevalier being Muslim.

Besides Espaillat and Avila Chevalier, two other minor candidates made the primary ballot for the race; Oscar Romero and Theo Chino-Tavarez, both of whom campaigned as socialists. Romero ran on making access to housing, healthcare and education recognised human rights. Chino-Tavarez was national secretary of the Social Democrats of America, a small DSA splinter group that had split from the wider organization in 2017 due to the DSA aligning with the Progressive International over the Socialist International. He based his campaign around supposedly being the only true socialist in the race, declaring that Espaillat was a right wing Christian democrat and that Avila Chevalier and Romero were "communist anarchists".

==== Policy disagreements ====
Avila Chevalier made the abolition of the Immigrations and Customs Enforcement agency (ICE) one of the key planks of her campaign. Espaillat, who was formerly an undocumented immigrant himself, also called for ICE to be dismantled. Avila Chevalier however criticised him for voting in favour of several omnibus spending bills that provided funding for the agency, using this and the Mahmoud Khalil detention case to argue that the incumbent was insufficiently committed to dismantling it.

The Gaza War and Israel more broadly were major issues on the campaign trail, with Avila Chevalier condemning Israel as an apartheid state that was committing genocide in Gaza. As such, Avila Chevalier sought to end American support for Israel. Making reference to the detention of Khalil, she declared that Espaillat had been compromised by financial support from pro-Israel groups, and was placing their interests before the interests of his constituents. Espaillat supported a ceasefire in the Israel-Hamas war and has called it a "horrific situation", but rejected the word "genocide", refused to co-sign the Block the Bombs Act and declared that he did not consider Israel as the culprit in the conflict.

Avila Chevalier came under scrutiny for attending an October 8, 2023 pro-Palestinian rally in Times Square organized by the Party for Socialism and Liberation that was condemned by many politicians, including Avila Chevalier's fellow Mamdani-endorsee Brad Lander, for supposedly supporting the actions of Hamas. In March 2026, during a forum with the Broadway Democrats political club, Avila Chevalier, when asked whether she condemned Hamas for the October 7 attacks, responded: "The premise of that question, to me, ignores the 75 years of occupation that the Palestinian people have been subjected to and the conditions that folks were living under before this genocide began." When asked about condemning Hamas again in June, she said she did but added, "As far as I know, the US does not send a single dime to Hamas. What we fund is the Israeli military." Jeff Coltin, writing in City & State, viewed these comments as Avila Chevalier deliberately moderating her rhetoric in an effort to reassure voters.

The construction of affordable housing became a point of dispute between Espaillat and Avila Chevalier, despite both candidates supporting its construction. Gentrification was the primary cause of this dispute, with Espaillat arguing that Avila Chevalier's campaign was being driven by largely white internal migrants that were driving out local residents of Upper Manhattan by increasing the price of rent. Avila Chevalier countered by arguing that not being born in New York was irrelevant, and that a willingness to defend the 'material interests' of local communities was more important. Avila Chevalier supported federal funding for new social housing to lower rents.

==== Avila Chevalier's tweets ====
Between 2018 and 2022, Avila Chevalier made tweets which criticized mainstream Democrats and advocated for the abolition of police, prisons and borders. She responded to the coverage by saying "I was young, yes, and I was a millennial with internet access". Mamdani repeated his endorsement of Avila Chevalier, labelling her "the champion we need for a city New Yorkers can actually afford".

==== Antihaitianismo ====
Both Espaillat and Avila Chevalier are Dominican-Americans. However, during the campaign, Avila Chevalier was the target of racism animated by antihaitianismo in conservative Dominican circles. Some supporters of Espaillat falsely claimed she was Haitian, questioned her fidelity to the Dominican community in New York City, and referred to her as "Haitian" as a racial slur. City & State reported that a senior adviser to Espaillat, Rusking Pimentel, made racist and Islamophobic comments regarding Avila Chevalier in Spanish media, claiming that she and Mamdani sought to replace Dominicans with Muslims and Haitians. Espaillat disavowed the comments and told his supporters not to question Avila Chevalier’s heritage, asserting "she's Dominican". On election day, Avila Chevalier left an interview on the Spanish-language radio station La Mega 97.9 FM after she was yelled at by multiple hosts for supposedly disrespecting the flag of the Dominican Republic.

=== Candidates ===
==== Nominee ====
- Darializa Avila Chevalier, graduate student and community organizer

==== Eliminated in primary ====
- Adriano Espaillat, incumbent U.S. representative
- Theo Chino-Tavarez, first national secretary at the Social Democrats of America
- Oscar Romero, chief information officer of the New York City Civic Engagement Commission

==== Withdrawn ====
- Jaliel Amador, teacher (endorsed Espaillat)
- Michael Hano, pet food salesman & candidate for this district in 2022
- James Felton Keith, activist, non-profit executive and candidate for this district in 2020
- Matt Miller, activist
- Megan C. Rodriguez, former congressional staffer

=== Debates ===
On June 4, Avila Chevalier and Espaillat participated in a radio forum hosted by Brian Lehrer on WNYC. On June 12, Avila Chevalier and Espaillat participated in a forum hosted by Dan Mannarino on PIX11 News.

On June 15, Avila Chevalier, Espaillat, Oscar Romero, and Theo Chino-Tavarez participated in a debate hosted by Gary Axelbank on BronxNet in partnership with City & State. The interview was aired the following day. On June 16, Avila Chevalier and Espaillat participated in a televised debate hosted by Errol Louis and Courtney Gross on NY1.

On June 17, Telemundo 47 aired a debate in Spanish with Avila Chevalier, Chino-Tavarez, Espaillat, and Romero, hosted by presenter Allan Villafaña and journalist Yolanda Vásquez.

2026 New York's 13th congressional district Democratic primary debates
No.	Date	Host	Moderator	Link	Democratic	Democratic	Democratic	Democratic
Key: P Participant A Absent N Not invited I Invited W Withdrawn								
Key: P Participant A Absent N Not invited I Invited W Withdrawn					Darializa Avila Chevalier	Adriano Espaillat	Theo Chino-Tavarez	Oscar Romero
1	Jun. 4, 2026	WNYC	Brian Lehrer	Audio	P	P	N	N
2	Jun. 12, 2026	PIX11	Dan Mannarino	YouTube	P	P	N	N
3	Jun. 15, 2026	BronxNet; City & State	Gary Axelbank	YouTube	P	P	P	P
4	Jun. 16, 2026	NY1	Errol Louis; Courtney Gross	YouTube	P	P	N	N
5	Jun. 17, 2026	Telemundo 47	Allan Villafaña; Yolanda Vásquez	YouTube	P	P	P	P

=== Endorsements ===
Adriano Espaillat

U.S. representatives

- Greg Casar, TX-35 (2023–present)
- Yvette Clarke, NY-09 (2007–present)
- Maxwell Frost, FL-10 (2023–present)
- Pramila Jayapal, WA-07 (2017–present)
- Hakeem Jeffries, House minority leader (2023–present) from NY-08 (2013–present)
- Robin Kelly, IL-02 (2013–present)
- Tim Kennedy, NY-26 (2024–present)
- Analilia Mejia, NJ-11 (2026–present)
- Nydia Velázquez, NY-07 (1993–present)

Statewide officials

- Kathy Hochul, governor of New York (2021–present)
- Letitia James, attorney general of New York (2019–present)

State legislators

- George Alvarez, state assemblymember from the 78th district (2023–present)
- Manny De Los Santos, state assemblymember from the 72nd district (2022–present)
- Yudelka Tapia, state assemblymember from the 86th district (2021–present)
- Al Taylor, state assemblymember from the 71st district (2017–present)
- Jordan Wright, state assemblymember from the 70th district (2025–present)
- Cordell Cleare, state senator from the 30th district (2021–present)

Local officials

- Shaun Abreu, New York City councilmember from the 7th district (2022–present)
- Carmen De La Rosa, New York City councilmember from the 10th district (2022–present)
- Elsie Encarnacion, New York City councilmember from the 8th district (2026–present)
- Oswald Feliz, New York City councilmember from the 15th district (2021–present)
- Mark Levine, New York City Comptroller (2026–present)
- Christopher Marte, New York City councilmember from the 1st district (2022–present)
- Julie Menin, speaker of the New York City Council (2026–present) from the 5th district (2022–present)
- Yusef Salaam, New York City councilmember from the 9th district (2024–present)

International politicians

- Pelegrín Castillo, former minister of energy and mines of the Dominican Republic (2014–2020)

Labor unions

- Communication Workers of America District 1
- Council of School Supervisors & Administrators
- District Council 37
- New York City Central Labor Council
- New York State AFL-CIO
- New York State Nurses Association
- New York State United Teachers
- NYC District Council of Carpenters

Organizations

- AIPAC
- Congressional Black Caucus PAC
- Congressional Hispanic Caucus BOLD PAC
- Congressional Progressive Caucus PAC
- Jim Owles Liberal Democratic Club
- League of Conservation Voters Action Fund
- Planned Parenthood Action Fund
- Population Connection
- Stonewall Democratic Club of New York
Darializa Avila Chevalier

U.S. representatives

- Jamaal Bowman, former NY-16 (2021–2025)

Statewide officials

- Keith Ellison, attorney general of Minnesota (2019–present)

State legislators

- Jabari Brisport, state senator from the 25th district (2021–present)
- Phara Souffrant Forrest, state assemblymember from the 57th district (2021–present)
- Emily Gallagher, state assemblymember from the 50th district (2021–present)
- Robert Jackson, state senator from the 31st district (2019–present)
- Marcela Mitaynes, state assemblymember from the 51st district (2021–present)
- Diana Moreno, state assemblymember from the 36th district (2026–present)
- Chris Rabb, Pennsylvania state representative from the 200th district (2017–present) and 2026 Democratic nominee for PA-3
- Julia Salazar, state senator from the 18th district (2019–present)
- Sarahana Shrestha, state assemblymember from the 103rd district (2023–present)
- Claire Valdez, state assemblymember from the 37th district (2025–present) and 2026 candidate for NY-7

Local officials

- Alexa Avilés, New York City councilmember from the 38th district (2022–present)
- Tiffany Cabán, New York City councilmember from the 22nd district (2021–present)
- Shahana Hanif, New York City councilmember from the 39th district (2022–present)
- Zohran Mamdani, mayor of New York City (2026–present)
- Chi Ossé, New York City councilmember from the 36th district (2022–present)

Individuals

- Kat Abughazaleh, journalist and social media influencer
- Cameron Kasky, co-founder of Never Again MSD and March for Our Lives organizer
- Hasan Piker, political commentator

Labor unions

- United Auto Workers Region 9A

Organizations

- American Priorities
- College Democrats of America
- Council on American–Islamic Relations Action New York
- Indivisible
- Jewish Voice for Peace Action
- Justice Democrats
- New York City Democratic Socialists of America
- Our Revolution
- PAL PAC
- Progressive Change Campaign Committee
- Progressive Democrats of America
- ~~Progressive Victory~~ (endorsement rescinded)
- Sunrise Movement
- Third Act Movement
- Track AIPAC
- US Campaign for Palestinian Rights Action
Declined to endorse

U.S. representatives

- Alexandria Ocasio-Cortez, NY-14 (2019–present)

State legislators

- Gustavo Rivera, state senator from the 33rd district (2011–present)
- Keith L.T. Wright, chair of the Manhattan Democratic Party (2009-present), former state assemblymember from the 70th district (1993–2016), and candidate for NY-13 in 2016

Political parties

- Working Families Party

Organizations

- Make the Road New York

=== Fundraising ===
Italics indicate a withdrawn candidate.

Campaign finance reports as of June 3, 2026
Candidate	Raised	Spent	Cash on hand
Darializa Avila Chevalier (D)	$929,685	$699,869	$229,817
Adriano Espaillat (D)	$2,104,259	$1,537,250	$963,434
Oscar Romero (D)	$19,378 (Note: $8,754 of this total was self-funded by Romero.)	$18,479	$899
Theo Chino-Tavarez (D)	$0	$0	$0
Source: Federal Election Commission

=== Polling ===
Poll source	Date(s) administered	Sample size (Note: Key: A – all adults RV – registered voters LV – likely voters V – unclear)	Margin of error	Darializa Avila Chevalier	Adriano Espaillat	Other	Undecided
Mercury Public Affairs (D) (Note: Poll sponsored by National Black Empowerment Action Fund, which supports Espaillat)	June 9–11, 2026	468 (LV)	± 4.5%	27%	35%	–	38%
Data for Progress (D) (Note: Poll sponsored by Justice Democrats, which supports Chevalier)	June 3–9, 2026	319 (LV)	–	39%	35%	4% (Note: Oscar Romero with 2%, Theo Chino-Tavarez with 2%)	22%
Upswing Research & Strategy (D) (Note: Poll sponsored by Chevalier's campaign)	March 25–30, 2026	598 (LV)	± 4.0%	28%	42%	4% (Note: Oscar Romero with 4%)	26%

=== Results ===
Avila Chevalier defeated Espaillat in the Democratic primary in an upset. Analyst Michael Lange noted that the electorate was heavily divided by age, with Avila Chevalier performing better among young voters of all stripes.

Avila Chevalier's margin of victory came from winning both White and Black voters, whereas Espaillat won Latinos. Reflecting this, Avila Chevalier won Hamilton Heights, Hudson Heights, northern Inwood and both Harlem and Spanish Harlem. Espaillat won the Bronx and the heavily-Dominican Washington Heights, along with Marble Hill.

Democratic primary results by county Avila Chevalier: 50–60%; Espaillat: 50–60%

Democratic primary results by precinct Avila Chevalier: 40–50%; 50–60%; 60–70%; 70–80%; Espaillat: 40–50%; 50–60%; 60–70%; 70–80%; 80–90%; 90–100%

Democratic primary results
Party	Candidate	Votes	%
Democratic	Darializa Avila Chevalier	36,292	49.5
Democratic	Adriano Espaillat (incumbent)	33,555	45.7
Democratic	Oscar Romero	2,631	3.6
Democratic	Theo Chino-Tavarez	623	0.8
Write-in		288	0.4
Total votes		73,389	100.0
Registered electors		338,109	

==== Results by county ====
County	Darializa Avila Chevalier		Adriano Espaillat		Others		Invalid		Total votes
County	#	%	#	%	#	%	#	%	Total votes
Bronx (part)	2,879	32.37	5,290	59.48	590	6.63	134	1.51	8,893
New York (part)	33,413	50.85	28,265	43.02	2,952	4.49	1,076	1.64	65,706
Totals	36,292	48.65	33,555	44.98	3,542	4.75	1,210	1.62	74,599

== Republican primary ==
=== Candidates ===
==== Nominee ====
- Jomo M. Williams, businessman and candidate for New York City Council in 2025

== General election ==
=== Predictions ===
Source	Ranking	As of
Decision Desk HQ	Safe D	July 14, 2026
The Cook Political Report	Solid D	February 6, 2025
Inside Elections	Solid D	March 7, 2025
Sabato's Crystal Ball	Safe D	September 18, 2025

=== Fundraising ===
Campaign finance reports as of June 30, 2026
Candidate	Raised	Spent	Cash on hand
Darializa Avila Chevalier (D)	$1,354,602	$1,132,514	$222,087
Source: Federal Election Commission

=== Results ===
2026 New York's 13th congressional district election
Party	Candidate	Votes	%	±%
Democratic	Darializa Avila Chevalier	116,061	72.04%	−11.50
Working Families	Darializa Avila Chevalier	24,953	15.49%	N/A
Total	Darializa Avila Chevalier	141,014	87.52%	+3.98
Republican	Jomo M. Williams	18,308	11.36%	−5.10
Write-in		1,795	1.11%	N/A
Total votes		161,117	100.0%	
Turnout		172,139	38.34%	
Registered electors		448,401		
Democratic hold				

== Notes ==
Partisan clients
