= Darializa Avila Chevalier =

American politician (born 1993/94)

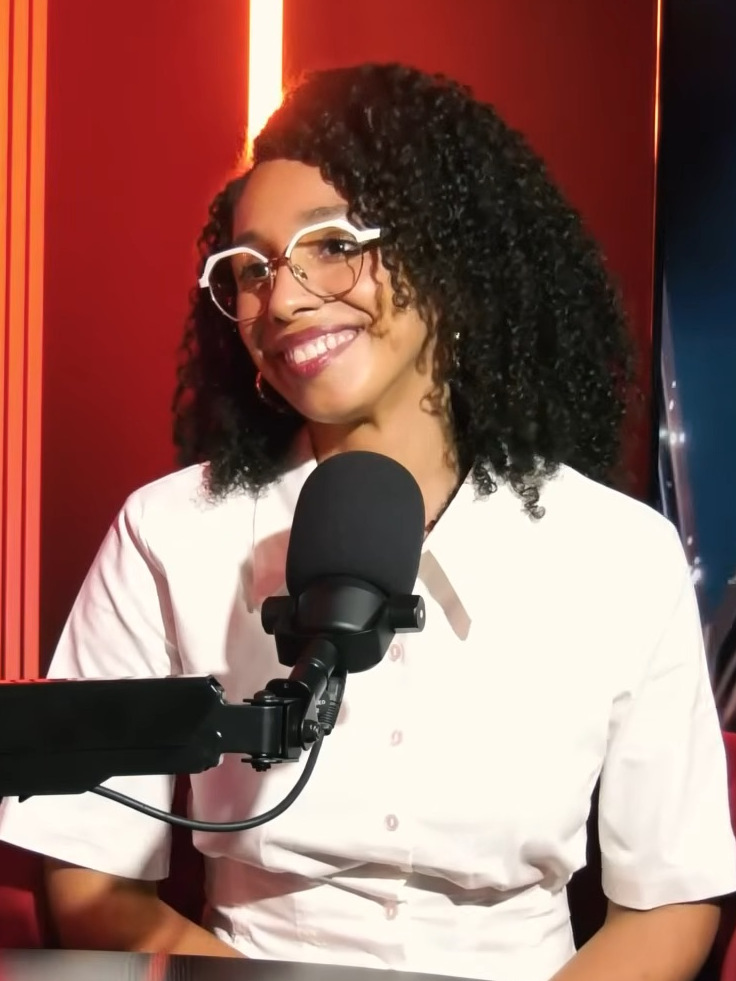
- Avila Chevalier in 2026

Member-elect of the U.S. House of Representatives from New York's 13th district
- Assuming office January 3, 2027
- Succeeding: Adriano Espaillat

Personal details
- Born: December 3, 1993 (age 32) Florida, U.S.
- Party: Democratic
- Other political affiliations: Democratic Socialists of America (Note: The Democratic Socialists of America (DSA) is not a registered political party but a political organization for those with democratic socialist ideologies.)
- Education: Columbia University (BA); City University of New York (MPhil)
- Website: Campaign website

Darializa Avila Chevalier (born December 3, 1993), also known as DAC, is an American politician and community organizer who is the U.S. representative-elect for New York's 13th congressional district. She is a member of the Democratic Party and the Democratic Socialists of America.

Born and raised in Florida, Avila Chevalier moved to New York City in 2012 to study at Columbia College, where she received a Bachelor of Arts in Middle Eastern studies. She is a doctoral candidate in sociology at the City University of New York, studying the way black immigrants from Latin America are impacted by the U.S. criminal justice system and deportation.

== Early life and education ==
Avila Chevalier was born and raised in Florida to working-class Dominican immigrant parents. Her father is a truck driver and her mother a caseworker. She also lived in the Dominican Republic and Venezuela and speaks fluent Spanish. Her maternal grandfather was a member of the resistance movement against Dominican dictator Rafael Trujillo and his successor Joaquín Balaguer, leading the family to emigrate to the US.

Avila Chevalier spent her childhood in Miami, and many of her teenage years in Tallahassee, where she attended Hartsfield Elementary School and Fairview Middle School, graduating from James S. Rickards High School in 2012.

Avila Chevalier moved to New York City to study at Columbia College, Columbia University, where she was an illustrator for the Columbia Daily Spectator. She graduated in 2016 with a Bachelor of Arts in Middle Eastern studies.

As a student at Columbia College, Avila Chevalier organized with Students for Justice in Palestine and Mobilized African Diaspora. In 2014 Avila Chevalier lived in the Palestinian city of Nablus for around two months while interning for Tomorrow's Youth Organization to teach English to Palestinian toddlers and children. The 2014 Gaza War started shortly after she returned to the US. She credited this period with shaping her view that the oppression of Palestinians is directly linked to the American system, saying, "these are not only like systems, they are the same system. It was the same tear gas made in the USA that was being dropped on Gaza that was also being used against Black Lives Matter protesters in Ferguson." She co-founded student organization Columbia University Apartheid Divest, helping establish it in 2016.

Avila Chevalier began a PhD program in sociology at the Graduate School and University Center of the City University of New York, becoming a doctoral candidate by 2025. Her research has focused on immigration law and policy and incarceration in the United States, especially on the ways Black immigrants from Latin America have been affected by the U.S. criminal justice system and deportation.

== Early career and activism ==
=== Black Youth Project 100 ===
After graduating from Columbia, Avila Chevalier organized with the Black Youth Project 100. In 2018, the group demanded removal of a Central Park statue of J. Marion Sims, a 19th-century gynecologist who performed controversial surgical procedures on enslaved African-American women without anesthesia. Avila Chevalier and three other Black women protested in front of the statue dressed in blood-stained hospital gowns, reading passages from Sims's autobiography, medical journals, and other historical material that they argued highlighted his dehumanization of enslaved women. The statue was moved later that year.

=== Families for Freedom ===
In 2019, as an organizer for Families for Freedom, Avila Chevalier protested to free Abdikadir Mohamed Felt, a Somali immigrant affected by President Donald Trump's "Muslim ban", from United States Immigration and Customs Enforcement (ICE) detention. She later published an analysis of the convergence of U.S. counterterrorism policy and immigration enforcement as exemplified by the emergence of United States Customs and Border Protection's (CBP) units known as Tactical Terrorism Response Teams, with Abdikadir Mohamed's encounter with such a unit serving as a case study.

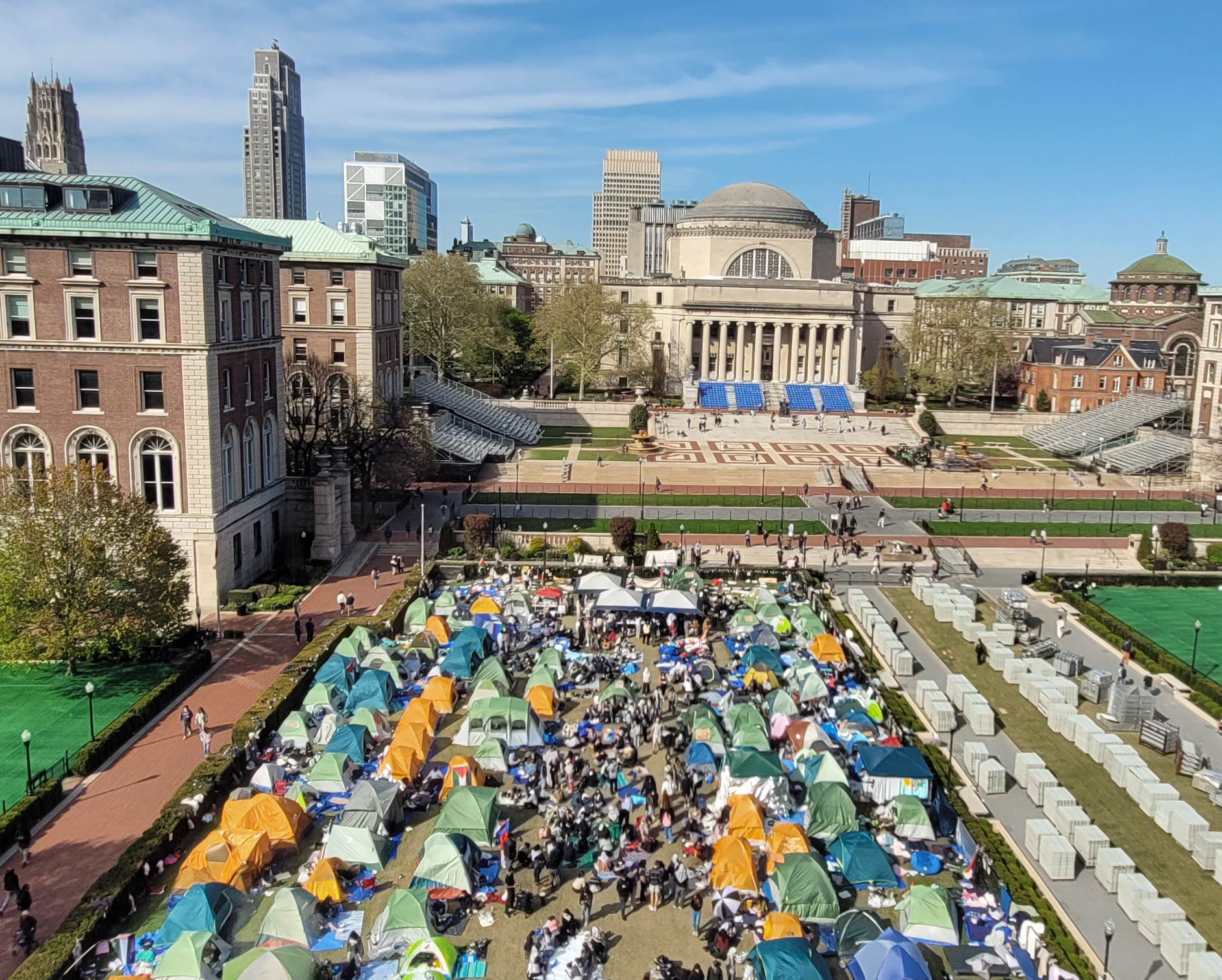
Avila Chevalier participated in the April 2024 Columbia University Gaza Solidarity Encampment

As an alumna, Avila Chevalier participated in the April 2024 Gaza Solidarity Encampment, part of the protests at Columbia University demanding that the university officially call for a ceasefire and disinvest from Israel during the war and genocide in Gaza, for which she was targeted by Canary Mission, a pro-Israel doxing website.

In November 2023, when Columbia suspended its chapters of Students for Justice in Palestine and Jewish Voice for Peace, Avila Chevalier said the university should "protect speech and protect the right of faculty and students to address these issues in an open and frank way". On April 30, 2024, riot police forcibly removed protesters, including Avila Chevalier, from the entrance to Hamilton Hall. Avila Chevalier said that officers pushed her and other protesters to the floor, leaving them with bruises.

=== Career ===
Avila Chevalier has taught at CUNY Lehman College and New York University.

She works as an investigator at the public defender legal organization Neighborhood Defender Service of Harlem, where she is a member of the Association of Legal Aid Attorneys – United Auto Workers Local 2325. Her work has investigated police brutality in the United States.

== U.S. House of Representatives ==
=== Elections ===
==== 2026 ====
2026 Democratic primary results by precinct Avila Chevalier: 40–50%; 50–60%; 60–70%; 70–80%; Espaillat: 40–50%; 50–60%; 60–70%; 70–80%; 80–90%; 90–100%

Avila Chevalier ran in the Democratic primary for New York's 13th congressional district, challenging incumbent Adriano Espaillat, chair of the Congressional Hispanic Caucus, who has represented the district since 2017. NY-13 encompasses Harlem and the southwest section of the Bronx and is one of the most Democratic districts in the country. At 32, she would be one of the youngest members of Congress. Avila Chevalier was the only challenger to outraise an incumbent in New York City during the first quarter of 2026. An April 2026 internal campaign poll showed her trailing Espaillat by 18 percentage points after voters were read biographical statements about both candidates.

Avila Chevalier was recruited to run by Justice Democrats, who previously helped Ocasio-Cortez win her 2018 election against an incumbent. Avila Chevalier was endorsed by New York mayor Zohran Mamdani, United Auto Workers Region 9A, the New York City Democratic Socialists of America, and Jewish Voice for Peace Action. She was also supported by former U.S. representative Jamaal Bowman and political commentator Hasan Piker.

Outside groups spent heavily in the race. The Congressional Hispanic Caucus's political arm spent to support Espaillat, and AIPAC spent at least $650,000 opposing Avila Chevalier; AIPAC-associated donors also spent to support Espaillat.

Espaillat retained support from several progressive Democrats, including Congressional Progressive Caucus chair Greg Casar. The Congressional Black Caucus also backed him in the primary. The race highlighted tensions between the Democratic Party's "establishment" wing and its democratic socialists. Espaillat called Avila Chevalier's democratic socialism a "failed ideology".

During the campaign, Avila Chevalier faced criticism and controversy regarding her background. City & State reported that Rusking Pimentel, a senior adviser to Espaillat, made comments about Avila Chevalier that were characterized as racist and Islamophobic in Spanish-language media. Some Espaillat supporters publicly questioned her ties to the Dominican community in New York City, incorrectly identifying her as Haitian. In a separate exchange, Espaillat called some Avila Chevalier supporters "gentrifiers" who, he said, contributed to rising rents. Avila Chevalier has advocated for federal funding to support the development of social housing.

News media and Espaillat scrutinized tweets Avila Chevalier made from a Twitter account she used from 2018 to 2022. She said she deleted the account before Twitter was acquired by Elon Musk to focus on her studies and on organizing. In her tweets, Avila Chevalier criticized mainstream Democrats, calling Joe Biden "a rapist" and a "war criminal". She later said she voted for Biden in that year's presidential election. She tweeted "fuck Kamala Harris" in 2021 after Harris gave a speech discouraging migration to the US, but apologized publicly to Harris during a debate. She later said her posts came from a sense of political disempowerment felt by many Americans.

In other tweets, she advocated prison abolition, police abolition, and border abolition. She rejected the view that Israel has a "right to exist" as a Jewish state. Other tweets related to communism, COVID-19, and interracial relationships. (Note: One of her posts in 2019 supported the seizure of the means of production. Her repost called for nationalization of pharmaceutical companies, hospitals and landlords' property. Avila Chevalier's tweets from 2020 to 2022 contained various references to communism and Marxism. One of her retweets recommended that people read Karl Marx's Das Kapital. In a May 2020 tweet, she called COVID-19 a "European plague" and boosted a post suggesting the virus originated in France rather than Wuhan, China. She also criticized "Black" and "Arab men" for "fetishizing ugly colonizer women". In another tweet she responded to a prompt of "interracial relationship discourse, go" with a celebratory image, followed by "No yts tho" and an emoji. The New York Times and The Washington Post suggested this disparaged interracial relationships involving White people.) She responded to coverage of her posts by saying, "I was young, yes, and I was a millennial with internet access", and added that the attention was "litigating the politics of the past instead of the politics of the future and the present". Avila Chevalier said she regrets her past Twitter activity due to the division it caused. New York City mayor Zohran Mamdani reiterated his endorsement of her campaign after the report, citing her ongoing advocacy for immigrants and working-class New Yorkers.

Avila Chevalier defeated Espaillat in the Democratic primary. According to incomplete returns, she won 49.4% of the vote to his 45.9%; she won younger voters by 24%, college-educated voters by 20%, higher-income voters by 6%, and black voters by 2%. Espaillat won lower-income voters by 10% and Hispanic voters by 16%. Avila Chevalier will be the first socialist to represent the district since Vito Marcantonio in the 1950s.

=== Tenure ===
In November 2026, Avila Chevalier, along with six other progressive members-elect, voted against nominating Hakeem Jeffries for House speaker. The seven members-elect released a public joint statement, saying, "While we have seen meaningful progress, there is still work to be done to ensure that the direction our party takes this coming Congress reflects what our constituents are demanding of leadership."

== Political positions ==
Avila Chevalier is a political progressive and democratic socialist. The New York Times has characterized her views as far-left. In an interview with MS NOW, she said she is not a communist. Avila Chevalier opposes all forms of deportation as well as U.S. support for Israel during the war and genocide in Gaza. According to The Guardian, Avila Chevalier's campaign platform focused on several priorities, including universal healthcare, expanded protection for renters, a shift in federal spending toward youth programs, abolishing U.S. Immigration and Customs Enforcement (ICE), banning large super PACs from elections, and the prohibition of stock trading by members of Congress.

Avila Chevalier is a member of the New York City Democratic Socialists of America (NYC-DSA), which she joined in 2025. She has described her political views as having been informed by the Black radical tradition, specifically the writings of Angela Davis and Assata Shakur, as well as her experience in Palestine in 2014. In the 2025 New York City mayoral election, Avila Chevalier was an organizing lead on DSA member Zohran Mamdani's campaign.

On April 13, 2026, Avila Chevalier joined a Jewish Voice for Peace protest asking Senators Kirsten Gillibrand and Chuck Schumer to vote against selling weapons to Israel. Police arrested protesters, including Avila Chevalier, whose shirt read "fund people, not bombs". In March 2026, she participated in a Columbia University rally calling for the release of Khalil and Leqaa Kordia. In September 2026, Avila Chevalier and more than 100 protesters were arrested at a protest of a speech by Israeli prime minister Benjamin Netanyahu at the United Nations General Assembly.

=== Foreign policy ===
==== Israel and Palestine ====
The publication City and State has described Avila Chevalier as being "unequivocal in condemning Israel as an apartheid state committing genocide". In March 2026, during a forum with the Broadway Democrats political club, Avila Chevalier, when asked whether she condemned Hamas for the October 7 attacks, responded: "The premise of that question, to me, ignores the 75 years of occupation that the Palestinian people have been subjected to and the conditions that folks were living under before this genocide began." When asked about condemning Hamas again in June, she said she did but added, "As far as I know, the U.S. does not send a single dime to Hamas. What we fund is the Israeli military."

On October 8, 2023, Avila Chevalier attended a pro-Palestinian rally in Times Square, a day after the October 7 Hamas attacks on Israel. The rally was organized by groups such as The People's Forum and Al-Awda New York. It was criticized by numerous New York politicians—including Alexandria Ocasio-Cortez, Brad Lander, and Kathy Hochul—as condoning the violence carried out by Hamas during the attacks. In an interview with City & State, Avila Chevalier said: "I can only say I have been advocating for the human rights of Palestinians for my adult life. And as someone who has seen a pattern, whenever anything happens on the ground [in Israel], there's always a really outsized reaction that costs thousands of people their lives."

Avila Chevalier has been active in protests against U.S. support for Israel and strongly criticized Espaillat's support of Israel and acceptance of campaign funds from AIPAC during the primary. In an interview with Jewish Currents, she said Espaillat "has used his time in Congress to give ICE billions, fund the Israeli military, and vote for Trump's crypto corruption—while being bankrolled by AIPAC and the real estate lobby".

Avila Chevalier supports the Block the Bombs Act, which would limit the sale, transfer, or exporting of defense articles and services to Israel. In June, American Priorities, a super PAC established to oppose AIPAC, pledged funding to support Avila Chevalier, Claire Valdez, and Brad Lander.

==== Iran war ====
In April 2026, as wars continued in Iran, Lebanon, and Palestine, Avila Chevalier participated in protests in Manhattan against the sending of weapons to Israel and was arrested during the protest. Chevalier said at the protest that New Yorkers were tired of hearing that there is insufficient funding for childcare and healthcare services while billions of dollars are spent on killing. In August 2026, in response to a question about the Iran war, she said that the costs of the war could have been spent on providing universal childcare services.

==== Ukraine ====
In 2022, Avila Chevalier tweeted that the reason the United States was involved in the Russian invasion of Ukraine was that "the Cold War ended and we've been bullying Russia ever since". In a 2026 interview, she said she believed Ukraine was a victim of Russia's violation of its sovereignty, and that diplomacy with Russia should be pursued.

=== Housing ===
Avila Chevalier supports universal housing, stronger tenant protections, and federal funding to build more social housing. She has criticized gentrification and displacement in the district, saying that over 200,000 Black New Yorkers have left the city in the last 20 years.

=== Healthcare and social spending ===
Avila Chevalier supports universal healthcare through Medicare For All. "Babies Not Bombs" was a signature pledge of her campaign. She has called for federal resources to be directed toward schools, housing, and social safety-net programs.

=== Campaign finance and corporate power ===
Avila Chevalier supports banning large super PACs from elections and prohibiting members of Congress from trading stocks.

=== Billionaires ===
In an interview with Ryan Grim on the podcast Breaking Points, she agreed with Fran Lebowitz's suggestion that billionaires threatening to leave New York City should do so.

=== Immigration ===
Avila Chevalier supports abolishing ICE, expanding pathways to citizenship for immigrants in the US, and opposes all forms of deportation, saying in a June 2026 interview, "I have yet to come up with a reason for why deportation has been used in a way that isn't rooted in deeply racist ideology." When Astead Herndon asked her about the deportation of people convicted of breaking U.S. criminal law, she responded that she opposed it, saying:

We have a criminal system. It isn't perfect, but it exists, and if it is one that we accept as the process by which we want to engage with these issues—issues of harm, issues of criminality, or what have you—then we need to make sure that it isn't one that is also discriminatory on the basis of where people were born.

When asked about open borders, Avila Chevalier called free movement an "ideal vision", saying, "capital can move freely across the world, but people are trapped." In 2025, Avila Chevalier wrote an op-ed in USA Today calling for the freedom of Mahmoud Khalil after he was taken from his home and detained by ICE, writing:

Immigration courts and detention centers have, for decades, been an abuse of administrative power. By targeting Mahmoud, Trump is now taking this abuse of power to a whole new level and making an example of him to silence those speaking out for the lives and human rights of Palestinians.

=== Policing and public safety ===
Avila Chevalier supports prison abolition. In a June 2026 interview with MS NOW, she said she wanted to use her position in Congress to make the United States "a society where we don't have murders" through investment in mental health services, healthcare, housing, and social programs. She said incarceration for murderers is "just the reality of what is going to happen" and described her position as "a vision for what we should have".

Avila Chevalier praised Mamdani's effort to create the Department of Community Safety, and said crime reduction correlates with funding for social safety nets.

==== Criticisms of the NYPD ====
In October 2026, Avila Chevalier called for the removal of Jessica Tisch as New York City police commissioner, saying, "The NYPD's Strategic Response Group must be disbanded as quickly as possible, and Commissioner Tisch must step down." Her comments came in response to the shooting of a suspected illegal immigrant by an Immigration and Customs Enforcement officer in the city. Protests, which Avila Chevalier participated in, occurred in the wake of the shooting and the NYPD deployed officers to manage the situation.

During an incident between protesters and police, video footage showed Avila Chevalier falling to the ground after being pushed by a police officer. In a written statement, she claimed the NYPD "escalat[ed] violence" between officers and protesters, writing she "was shoved to the ground" and "witnessed unmarked law enforcement cars hitting protesters as NYPD officers pushed people out of its path". Avila Chevalier also alleged that Tisch "attempted to justify the shooting" and "spent more time protecting a militia that [had] just shot someone than protecting New Yorkers".

=== Socialism ===
Avila Chevalier is a democratic socialist and member of the Democratic Socialists of America. She said she came to her ideology through organizing work, her undergraduate and graduate studies, and the Black radical tradition. She described democratic socialism as "workers and people in general having ownership and dignity over their lives and their work, and achieving that democratically". She denied being a communist, and said the question was a distraction. She posted tweets favorable to communist leaders and Marxism around 2020.

Also in 2020, she critiqued the lack of Marxist literature in public libraries, including by Vladimir Lenin, and reposted a post criticizing "banned books" displays for not including the works of Joseph Stalin. In 2026, she said that was because she believed in freedom of speech and access to all kinds of thought, especially in the wake of book censorship.

=== Impeachment of Donald Trump ===
During an interview with Politico, Avila Chevalier was asked whether she would support impeaching President Donald Trump once she took office. She replied: "That is something that Trump himself seems to want, and so my question is: Is that actually going to be meaningful accountability for the Trump administration? We are going to have to think about what is actually going to hold their feet to the fire."

== Personal life ==
Avila Chevalier is Afro-Latina. In 2018, she converted to Islam. Since 2023, she has been in a romantic relationship with Ramzi Kassem, who in 2026 became the chief legal counsel in Zohran Mamdani's mayoral administration.

== Electoral history ==
=== 2026 U.S. House of Representatives ===
2026 New York's 13th congressional district election
Primary election
Party	Candidate	Votes	%
Democratic	Darializa Avila Chevalier	32,790	48.60
Democratic	Adriano Espaillat (incumbent)	30,464	45.15
Democratic	Oscar J. Romero Jr	2,340	3.47
Democratic	Theo Bruce Chino-Tavarez	532	0.79
Total votes		67,473	100.0

== See also ==
- Latin American Muslims

U.S. House of Representatives
Preceded by Adriano Espaillat	Member of the U.S. House of Representatives from New York's 13th congressional district Taking office 2027	Elect
