= Jay S. Jacobs =

American politician (New York)

Jay Jacobs

Chair of the New York State Democratic Party
- Incumbent
- Assumed office January 15, 2019
- Preceded by: Byron Brown
- In office October 1, 2009 – June 5, 2012
- Preceded by: June O'Neill; Dave Pollak
- Succeeded by: Stephanie Miner; Keith L. T. Wright

Personal details
- Born: 1955 or 1956 (age 70–71)
- Party: Democratic
- Children: 2
- Education: State University of New York, Oneonta (BA); Northwestern University (JD)

Jay S. Jacobs (born 1955/1956) is an American politician working as the chair of the New York State Democratic Party.

== Early life and education ==
Jacobs was raised in Forest Hills, Queens. He earned a Bachelor of Arts degree in economics and political science from the State University of New York at Oneonta and a Juris Doctor from the School of Law at Northwestern University.

== Career ==
Jacobs became the chair of the Nassau County Democratic Party in 2001. Jacobs served as chairman of the New York State Democratic Party from 2009 to 2012. He was appointed by David Paterson. Outside of politics, Jacobs is the CEO of the TLC Family of Camps & Inns, which operates summer camps and inns in New York and Pennsylvania.

=== Second tenure as New York State Democratic Party chairman ===
In 2019, New York Governor Andrew Cuomo appointed Jacobs to his second tenure as chairman of the New York State Democratic Party.

In 2021, Jacobs declined to endorse India Walton for mayor of Buffalo. In an interview with Spectrum News, he compared Walton's primary win to a hypothetical situation in which Ku Klux Klan leader David Duke won the primary, arguing that the state party is not bound to endorse the Democratic primary winner. Congressman Jamaal Bowman called on Jacobs to resign, saying "It's insane to equate India Walton, a Black woman, with David Duke, someone who supports the legacy of lynching Black people and the rape of Black women." Jacobs apologized for the remarks. New York Governor Kathy Hochul condemned the remarks but did not call for Jacobs's resignation.

In the 2022 midterm elections, New York Democrats lost four congressional seats to Republicans. Brad Lander, Chi Ossé and Alessandra Biaggi called on Jacobs to resign, alleging that the state party lacked strategy and insufficiently invested in a get-out-the-vote effort. Jacobs countered that he was attacked for his moderate political views and that the party had spent money on an absentee ballot program. Jacobs was supported by Kathy Hochul and the chairs of over 40 county parties.

According to the New York Times, in February 2023 people whose names were raised as his possible successor included U.S. Congressman Adriano Espaillat, U.S. Congresswoman Grace Meng, and Queens state senator Jessica Ramos.

In the 2025 New York City mayoral election, Jacobs broke with the governor and refused to endorse or support Zohran Mamdani, the Democratic nominee and eventual winner.

Party political offices
Preceded by June O'Neill; Dave Pollak	Chair of the New York Democratic Party; 2009–2012	Succeeded by Stephanie Miner; Keith L. T. Wright
Preceded by Byron Brown	Chair of the New York Democratic Party; 2019–present	Incumbent
