= Jeffrion L. Aubry =

American politician

Jeff Aubry
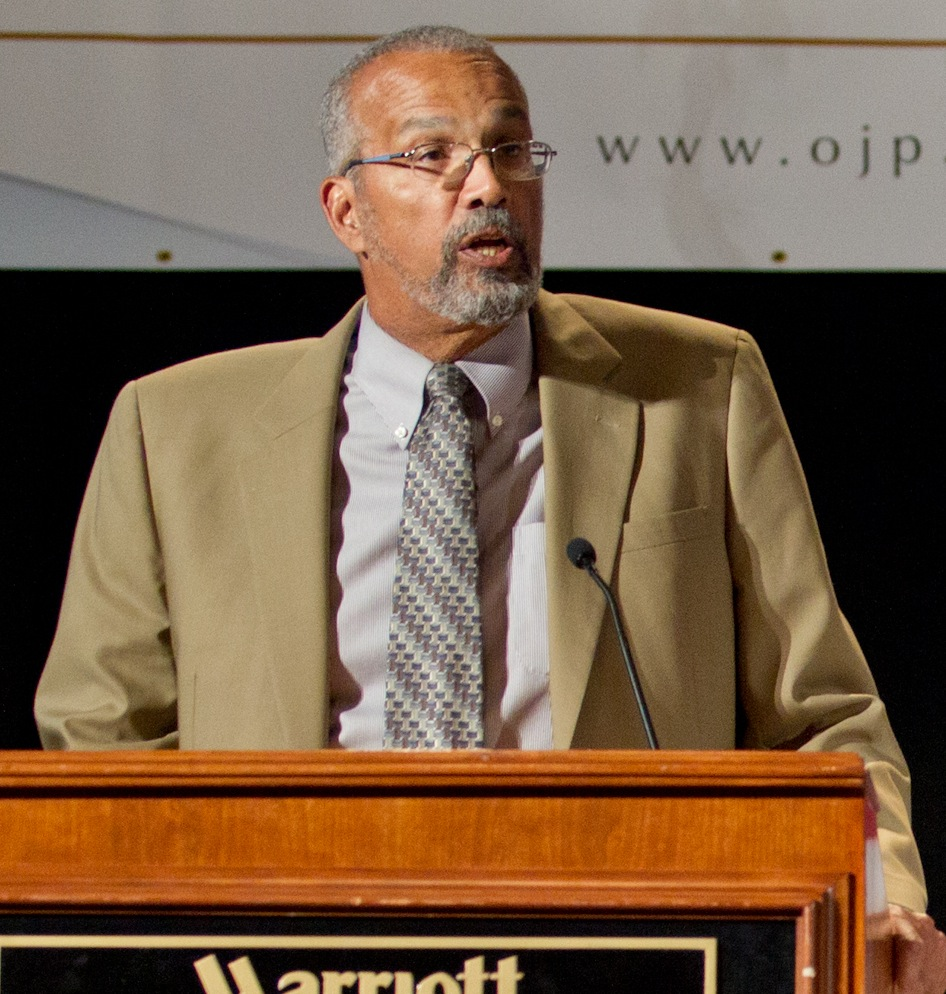

Speaker pro tempore of the New York State Assembly
- In office January 9, 2013 – December 31, 2024
- Preceded by: Peter Rivera
- Succeeded by: Pamela Hunter

Member of the New York State Assembly from the 35th district
- In office January 28, 1992 – December 31, 2024
- Preceded by: Helen Marshall
- Succeeded by: Larinda Hooks

Personal details
- Born: February 8, 1948 (age 78) New Orleans, Louisiana, U.S.
- Party: Democratic
- Children: 2
- Education: Santa Fe University of Art and Design (BA)
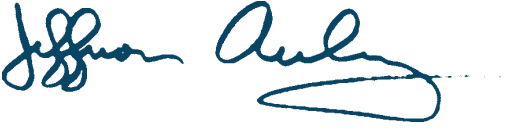
- Signature

Jeffrion L. Aubry (born February 8, 1948) is an American politician from the state of New York. A Democrat, Aubry represented District 35 in the New York State Assembly from 1992 to 2024; his district comprises East Elmhurst, LeFrak City, and parts of Corona, Woodside, Elmhurst and Rego Park, Queens.

== Early life and education ==
Aubry was born in New Orleans, Louisiana. He received a Bachelor of Arts from the College of Santa Fe (later the Santa Fe University of Art and Design) in 1969.

== Career ==
For 16 years, Aubry served as an employee of Elmcor Youth and Adult Activities, a not-for-profit organization. He held various positions at Elmcor, including the position of executive director. Aubry was also a teacher at New Mexico State Penitentiary for Eastern New Mexico University.

Prior to his election to the Assembly, Aubry held a number of jobs within New York City government. He worked as the director of economic development for the Office of the borough president of Queens and as the Queens representative to the Economic Development Corporation of the City of New York. He has also served as the chairman of the Small Business Development Center's advisory board at York College and as a consultant for Massand Associates, an engineering firm.

=== New York State Assembly ===
Aubry was first elected to the Assembly in a 1992 special election. He ran uncontested in the 2008 and 2010 general elections. He has been a member of the Committees on Governmental Employees, Rules, Social Services, and Ways and Means, respectively. Aubry has also been a member of the Black, Puerto Rican, Hispanic & Asian Legislative Caucus. As the chairman of the Corrections Committee, he introduced The Drug Law Reform, Drug Treatment and Crime Reduction Act of 2001, also known as the reform of the Rockefeller drug laws. Aubry called the Rockefeller drug laws a failed policy that we can no longer sustain." The Rockefeller drug laws were repealed in 2009. Aubry also sponsored the HALT Solitary Confinement Act, which became law in 2021.

From 2013 to 2024, Aubry served as speaker pro tempore of the Assembly. In that capacity, he presided over Assembly session proceedings and welcomed guests who visited the Assembly chamber.

Aubry opted not to seek re-election in 2024. In December 2024, he retired from office; he was succeeded by Larinda Hooks, who received his endorsement.

New York State Assembly
Preceded by Tim Stubson	Speaker pro tempore of the New York Assembly; 2013–2024	Succeeded by Pamela Hunter
