= New Yorkers for Clean, Livable, and Safe Streets =

Animal rights organization

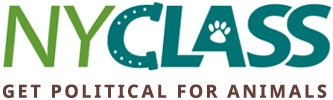
NYCLASS logo and motto

New Yorkers for Clean, Livable, and Safe Streets (NYCLASS) is an animal rights organization based in New York City established in 2008.

== NYCLASS and the 2013 New York City Election ==
NYCLASS was a member of the "Anybody but Quinn" coalition, also known as "NYC is Not For Sale," that played a role in the New York City mayoral elections in 2013 in opposing the candidacy of Christine Quinn. The politician's support began to decline after the coalition's PAC began its efforts, which raised $1.4 million for its initial television ads. NYC Is Not For Sale was the fourth largest independent spender in the New York City Elections, with NYCLASS own spending ranking 16th. The group endorsed Bill de Blasio in the general election. After his win, NYCLASS held a private fundraiser and awarded him a bronze horse. NYCLASS also endorsed other candidates such as Helen Rosenthal for City Council.

In August 2017, NYCLASS re-focused their efforts on proposals to improve the horses' working and living conditions, alleging horse suffering and cruelty related to carriage horses being worked in extreme and dangerous weather conditions and carriage drivers violating laws designed to protect the horses. In 2019, two improvements for carriage horses advocated for by NYCLASS were enacted. In February 2019, the "hack line", where the carriage horses board and unload passengers, was relocated out of the chaotic traffic on 59th Street and into three locations inside entrances of car-free Central Park.

In November 2019, Mayor Bill de Blasio enacted into law the NYCLASS-backed "Carriage Horse Heat Relief Bill," which changed the law to prohibit carriage horses from being worked during humid heat waves when the Equine Heat Index reached 150. NYCLASS had long pushed for changes to this law, and documented many instances of horses working in extreme heat and humidity and suffering heat distress.

== About NYCLASS ==
NYCLASS is a 501(c)(4) non-profit animal rights organization founded in 2008, committed to ending the animal abuse of New York City's carriage horses and improving the lives of all animals in New York by enacting animal rights legislation into law and electing pro-animal candidates into office. NYCLASS works on efforts to improve New York City animal shelters, increase legal protections for urban wildlife, and end animal abuse. In November 2019, legislation sponsored by Council Member Keith Powers and endorsed by NYCLASS to protect the carriage horses from extreme heat and humidity - The Carriage Horse Heat Relief Bill, was signed into law by Mayor Bill de Blasio. In March 2019, the boarding and drop-off locations for the carriage horses were relocated from traffic-heavy 59th Street to areas inside car-free Central Park, a longstanding effort of NYCLASS's to improve the welfare and well-being of the carriage horses and to increase public safety.
