= Bruce M. Wright =

American jurist (1917–2005)

Bruce McMarion Wright (born Marion Bruce Wright, December 19, 1917 – March 24, 2005) was an American jurist who served on the New York State Supreme Court. Judge Wright was also the father of Geoffrey D.S. Wright, a New York State Supreme Court Justice, and Keith L.T. Wright, a member of the New York State Assembly.

== Life ==
Wright was born in Baltimore, Maryland, raised in Princeton, New Jersey, and spent the majority of his adult life living in Harlem, New York. His mother was a White Catholic and his father an African American.

In 1939, Wright was awarded a scholarship to attend Princeton University, but denied admission when he arrived and the Dean of Admissions, Radcliffe Heermance, learned that he was black. Wright was denied admission to Notre Dame on the same grounds. He studied at Virginia Union University, and graduated from Lincoln University in 1942.

Wright then served in a U.S. Army segregated medical unit during World War II. He volunteered for combat duty, and was assigned to Company K, 16th Infantry Regiment. After the war, he went AWOL, making his way to Paris, where he was befriended by Senegalese poet Leopold Senghor, who later became his country's first president.

Wright's early ambition was to become a poet and was introduced and later became a friend of Langston Hughes. Wright's first book of poetry, "From the Shaken Tower," was edited by Hughes and published in 1944. He studied at Fordham University Law School, and obtained his law degree from New York Law School.

New York City Mayor John V. Lindsay appointed Wright as general counsel for the New York City Human Resources Administration in 1967, and named him to the New York City Criminal Court bench in 1970. Judge Wright was soon publicly critical of the judicial system and voiced his belief that race and class all too frequently determined the outcomes of trials. He denounced what he called racism in the criminal justice system, and created a furor by often setting low bail, and sometimes no bail, for poor or minority suspects. In one case, in which bail of $100,000 was requested by the Manhattan District Attorney's office for Joseph Gruttola, who had been accused of shooting a police officer, he set it at $500. After Gruttola posted bail and was released the same day, another judge revoked it and ordered him rearrested. When Grullota was brought into court the next day, Wright again set bail at $500. (Grutolla was eventually acquitted of attempted murder but convicted of assault and robbery.) In another case involving a man named Seymour Popkin, who had been charged in the beating of another man to death in a fistfight in Times Square, Judge Wright released him on his own recognizance after an assistant district attorney declined to release the name of a potential witness, despite Popkin's criminal record extending back 20 years. (The charge was eventually reduced to simple assault, and Popkin was acquitted at trial.)

Wright was given the nickname "Cut 'Em Loose Bruce" by the police officer's unions in New York City because of his bail practices, and it was repeated often in the New York newspapers.

After continued protests by the police officer's unions, Wright was transferred to New York City Civil Court in 1974 by David Ross, the city's administrative judge, who said it was just part of the usual rotations of judges and denied that the move had anything to do with his bail policies. Judge Wright then sued in federal court, seeking reinstatement, but in 1978, as hearings on his long-delayed lawsuit were about to begin, he was transferred back to Criminal Court.

The controversy promptly resumed, with the Transit Police union making their first complaint about Judge Wright a week after he returned to the Criminal Court bench. It peaked in April 1979, when Jerome Singleton was charged with slashing the throat of a white decoy officer, Robert Bilodeau. After bail had initially been set at $10,000 cash by another judge, Judge Wright released Singleton on his own recognizance, saying that he had no previous criminal record, strong family and community ties, and that prosecutors had offered no convincing reason to bar Singleton's release. (Singleton was eventually found guilty of second-degree assault and acquitted of first-degree assault and attempted murder.)

However, while some criticized Wright, others thought he was fair. Despite his outspoken views and practices, Wright was elected to the New York State Supreme Court in 1979.

Throughout his career, Wright held onto his belief that the judicial system, including bail, was stacked against poor and minority defendants. In a lecture at Columbia University Law School in 1979, he said that a more appropriate name for him would have been "Civil" Wright. He retired on December 31, 1994. Several days before his retirement, he said,

I have never changed my mind about the Eighth Amendment. To say that I would've done things differently means to me I would have been a good boy, kept my mouth shut and availed myself of the benefits of the system. I don't think I can do that. I don't think I could ever do that.

Judge Wright spent 25 years on the bench hearing criminal and civil cases, and had a reputation as a scholarly and provocative jurist who sprinkled his opinions with literary quotations. He taught as visiting scholar at Adelphi University, Garden City, New York in the African American Studies Department a course entitled, Law Against Minorities. He was the author of a 1987 book, Black Robes, White Justice, about the role of race in the judicial system, which won a 1991 American Book Award. He later authored an autobiography, "Black Justice In A White World." Sixty-five years after being denied admission because of his race, the Princeton Class of 2001 made him an honorary member of their class.

In retirement, Judge Wright worked as a "greeter" at the local, Old Saybrook, Wal-Mart. He explained this, saying he needed to supplement his retirement income in order to visit Italy, which he loved doing.

Judge Wright died in his sleep on March 24, 2005, at his home in Old Saybrook, Connecticut at the age of 87.
