= Inez Dickens =

American politician (born 1949)

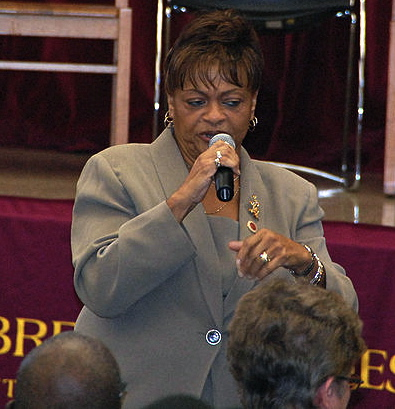
- Dickens in 2010

Member of the New York State Assembly from the 70th district
- In office January 1, 2017 – December 31, 2024
- Preceded by: Keith L. T. Wright
- Succeeded by: Jordan Wright

Majority Whip of the New York City Council
- In office January 1, 2006 – December 31, 2013
- Speaker: Christine Quinn

Member of the New York City Council from the 9th district
- In office January 1, 2006 – December 31, 2016
- Preceded by: Bill Perkins
- Succeeded by: Bill Perkins

Personal details
- Born: July 15, 1949 (age 77) New York, New York, U.S.
- Party: Democratic
- Website: Official website

Inez E. Dickens (born July 15, 1949) is an American politician. She served as a member of the New York State Assembly from 2017 to 2025, representing the 70th district in Manhattan. She also served as a member of the New York City Council from 2006 to 2016, representing the 9th district.

== Life and career ==
Dickens is a lifelong resident of Harlem, Manhattan. Her father, Lloyd E. Dickens, was a Democratic District Leader and a member of the New York Assembly, and her uncle Thomas K. Dickens was an assemblyman and a justice on the New York Supreme Court.

She attended P.S. 133 and Julia Richman High School, and later did undergraduate studies in real estate and land economics at New York University andsubsequently at Howard University and later continued education for graduation in Chicago. Dickens was first elected to office in 1974 as a State Party Committeewoman, and served in that capacity for 32 years.

In the 2004 presidential election, she served as one of New York's 33 presidential electors, casting her ballot for John Kerry. After Bill Perkins opted to run for the New York State Senate in 2005, Dickens entered the primary for City Council to replace him, and won. She won re-election handily in 2009 and again in 2013.

Inez became the councilmember for the 9th New York City Council District in 2006, serving the communities of Central Harlem, Morningside Heights, East Harlem and parts of the Upper West Side. As a newly elected council member, Inez was appointed majority whip and chair of the Committee on Standards and Ethics. She became the first African-American woman in the history of the New York City Council to be appointed to the positions of deputy majority leader and chair of the Subcommittee on Planning, Dispositions and Concessions.

In August 2013, the New York Post wrote a series of articles detailing Inez Dicken's history as a landlord. As of July 2013, she had $265,000 in unpaid code violations dating as far back as 2004, earning her a spot on the Public Advocate's "Worst Landlord's Watch List." She had previously voted to improve "slumlord accountability."

== New York Assembly ==
In 2016, Assemblyman Keith L. T. Wright, who had served in the Assembly for over 25 years, announced he would run to succeed long-time Congressman Charlie Rangel. However, his campaign was unsuccessful, losing to state Senator Adriano Espaillat in a very close race. While Wright had the opportunity to again run for his Assembly seat, he had promised not to, and instead retired to the private sector.

As a result, Dickens, term-limited at the end of 2017 in the Council, was selected to run for the seat. She was unopposed in the primary, and won the general election against Republican Heather Tarrant by a 93% to 7% margin. Dickens was sworn into her first term in the Assembly on January 1, 2017. State Senator Bill Perkins, who held Dickens' council seat until 2005, was elected to replace her in 2017.

A "grassroots" non-profit organization, "New York 4 Harlem", solicited donations of $500 to $5,000 and was reported in 2018 to have been a front for Dickens and three other Harlem elected officials. In addition, a flyer organizing a free bus trip to Albany for a conference organized by the NY State Assn. of Black and Puerto Rican Legislators with the New York 4 Harlem's name on it featured a picture of Dickens and the three other officials. Nonprofit organizations (501c3 organizations) except 501c4 organizations are not allowed to take part in campaign activity. The contact person for the event was a staffer working in the office of one of the other three legislators.

Dickens was the wealthiest member of the Assembly in 2014, with an estimated net worth of $2.1 million. She is the owner of 201 West 139th street estimated value $50 million.

Dickens was appointed to the leadership of the New York State Assembly as Deputy Majority Whip in 2023 She retired from the New York State Assembly at the end of her term on December 31st, 2024

== Election history ==
New York City Council: District 9
Election	Candidate	Party	Votes	Pct	Candidate	Party	Votes	Pct	Candidate	Party	Votes	Pct	Candidate	Party	Votes	Pct
2005 Primary	Inez Dickens	Dem	4,608	28.52%	Yasmin Cornelius	Dem	3,351	20.74%	Cynthia Doty	Dem	2,803	17.35%	Others (4)	Dem	4,888	30.26%
2005 General	Inez Dickens	Dem	21,222	81.26%	Will Brown Jr.	Rep	2,207	8.45%	Daryl Bloodsaw	Ind	1,773	6.79%	W. Henderson	Vet	913	3.50%
2009 Primary	Inez Dickens	Dem	8,430	66.42%	Landon Dais	Dem	2,648	20.86%	Carlton Berkley	Dem	1,615	12.72%				
2009 General	Inez Dickens	Dem	22,818	92.33%	Abbi Hoff	Rep	1,892	7.66%								
2013 Primary	Inez Dickens	Dem	12,878	69.98%	Vince Morgan	Dem	5,525	30.02%								
2013 General	Inez Dickens	Dem	23,454	99.06%												

Political offices
Preceded by Bill Perkins	New York City Council, 9th district 2006–2016	Succeeded by Bill Perkins (elect)
Preceded by Keith L.T. Wright	New York Assembly, 70th District; 2017–present	Incumbent
