= Larinda Hooks =

American politician

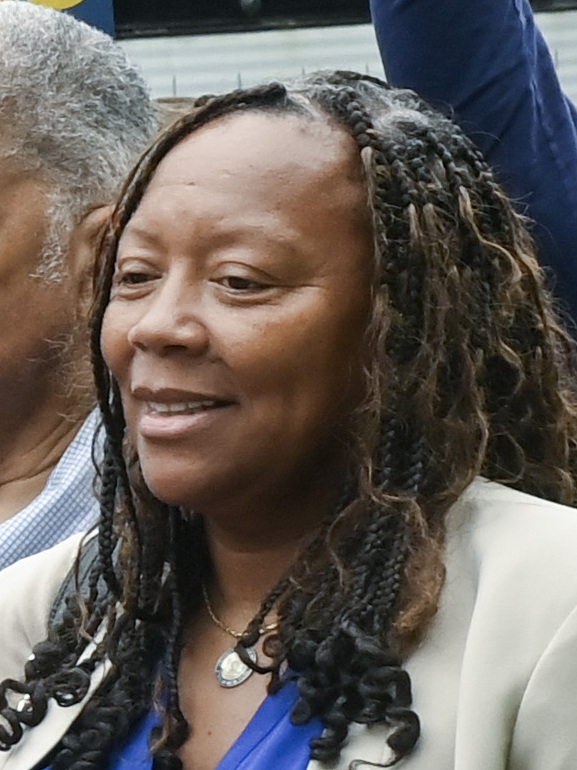
- Hooks in 2025

Member of the New York State Assembly from the 35th district
- Incumbent
- Assumed office January 1, 2025
- Preceded by: Jeffrion L. Aubry

Personal details
- Born: Corona, New York, U.S.
- Party: Democratic
- Children: 5

Larinda Camille Hooks is an American politician. She has served in the New York State Assembly, representing the 35th district, since 2025. A Democrat, she will represent the Queens neighborhoods of East Elmhurst, LeFrak City, and parts of Corona, Woodside, Elmhurst and Rego Park, Queens.

In the 2024 New York State Assembly election, she succeeded Jeffrion Aubry, winning unopposed after winning the Democratic primary in June 2024.

== Career ==
Hooks served in different local and civic organizations, prior to entering politics. She also served as a member of Queens' 3rd community board and as a district leader for Part A of the 35th district. In December 2023, incumbent assemblymember Jeffrion L. Aubry announced he would not seek re-election, and subsequently endorsed Hooks as his successor. She also received endorsements from Gregory Meeks, Donovan Richards and Alexandria Ocasio-Cortez. She won the Democratic primary on June 25, against former city councilman and state senator Hiram Monserrate.
