= Manhattan Democratic Party =

New York County Democratic Committee
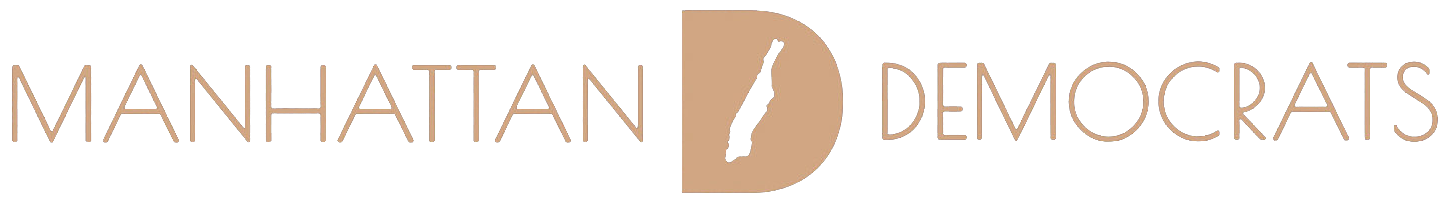
- Chairperson: Kyle Ishmael
- Membership (2021): ▼795,607
- Ideology: Progressivism; Social democracy Factions: Centrism; Modern liberalism Social Democracy
- National affiliation: Democratic Party
- Colors: Blue

Website
- manhattandemocrats.org

The Manhattan Democratic Party, officially the New York County Democratic Committee, is the affiliate of the Democratic Party in Manhattan, one of the five boroughs of New York City, which is coextensive with New York County. County members are elected every odd year by the registered Democrats in an Electoral District. during the primary election. Their role is to elect the chair, secretary and treasurer of the New York Democratic Party. The party is currently the dominant political force in the borough, regularly defeating the Manhattan Republican Party and unanimously hold all city council and state assembly seats in the borough.

In New York, county executive committees typically select candidates for local public offices, with the county committees ratifying the selections, including judicial candidates and the Democratic Party's nominee in special elections. County committees are composed of at least two members elected from each election district as well as two members elected from each assembly district within the county (assembly district leaders).

Every two years, Democrats in each assembly district elect two district leaders: one male, one female. In principle, county committee members select the county committee chair, but in New York City the practice is that the district leaders control the choice. The district leaders and chair make up the executive committee of the county committee. There are 13 assembly districts in Brooklyn, so when all seats are filled, the executive committee has 80 members. Each election district is made up of a small number of city blocks. Each election district has 4 seats in the general membership of the county committee, so when all the seats are filled, there are approximately 3,000 members. However, a vast number of these are left unfilled, undermining broad participation in county decision-making.
