= Keith L. T. Wright =

American politician (born 1955)

Keith Wright
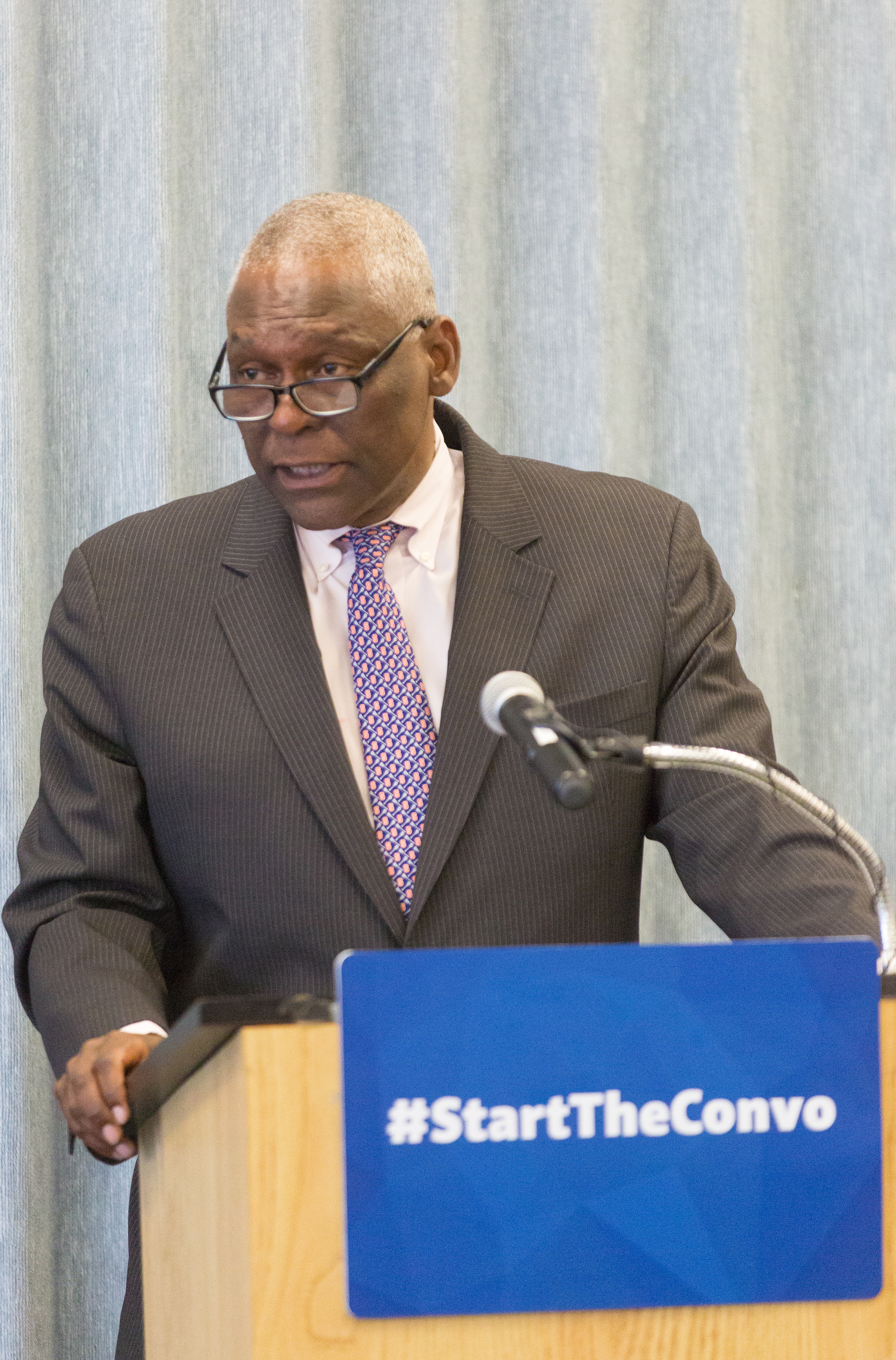

Chair of the Manhattan Democratic Party
- Incumbent
- Assumed office September 23, 2009
- Preceded by: Denny Farrell

Chair of the New York Democratic Party
- In office June 5, 2012 – May 21, 2014 Serving with Stephanie Miner (June 2012 – April 2014)
- Preceded by: Jay S. Jacobs
- Succeeded by: David Paterson

Member of the New York State Assembly from the 70th district
- In office January 3, 1993 – December 31, 2016
- Preceded by: Geraldine Daniels
- Succeeded by: Inez Dickens

Personal details
- Born: January 3, 1955 (age 71) New York City, New York, U.S.
- Party: Democratic
- Spouse: Susan Wright
- Children: 2, including Jordan
- Education: Tufts University (BA); Rutgers University, Newark (JD)

Keith L. T. Wright (born January 3, 1955) is an American politician and a former member of the New York State Assembly. He was first elected to the assembly in 1992 and was re-elected eleven times.

In early 2007, he proposed a bill limiting retail sale of violent video games for individuals below 18 years of age. This proposed law stirred up controversy and protest amongst gamer communities. Wright is also the author of the bill to apologize for African slavery in New York, which was second only to South Carolina in the American slave trade, the first Northern State make such an apology. Wright is also credited with coining the term "Super-Duper Tuesday" in response to the shifting of New York's election primary date to the 5th of February. This is now the common terminology for the change of dates nationwide.

== Prior career ==
Upon graduating from the Fieldston School, Wright attended Tufts University, where he made the Dean's Honor List. He received his Bachelor of Arts degree in 1977 and continued his educational career, obtaining a Juris Doctor from Rutgers University.

Prior to his election to the assembly, Wright was an associate in the Law Office of Ruffin E. Cotton Jr., specializing in corporate and securities law.

In 1983, he joined the staff of the Human Resources Administration (HRA) as Special Assistant to the General Counsel. He served in this capacity until 1986, leaving the HRA to assume a key position, Director of the Uptown Office, on the staff of then-Manhattan Borough President David Dinkins.

Following Dinkins' successful bid for office of Mayor for the City of New York, Wright left city government for the position of Assistant Director of Government Relations at the New York City Transit Authority.

Wright's father was also politically active. He was New York State Supreme Court Justice Bruce M. Wright. Wright is married to the former Susan I. Gayles and they have two sons, Keith "Jared" and Jordan.

== New York Assembly ==
Assemblyman Wright was a leader in the State Democratic party and chair of the New York State Assembly Housing Committee. During his tenure in the Assembly he also chaired key committees in the Assembly including; election law, social services and labor.

Assemblyman Wright's priorities cover a wide variety of issues, among them: the DREAM Act; improving access to historically underrepresented industries for women and minorities, raising the age of criminal responsibility so that 16- and 17-year-olds will no longer be inappropriately prosecuted as adults in New York State and expanding access to quality education for all children. As member of the Correction Committee and the Task Force on Criminal Justice Reform, Wright is a strong opponent of the death penalty and the Rockefeller Drug Laws. He is a strong advocate for criminal justice reform and following the Alberta Spruill incident, a case of mistaken identity that led to death when police stormed the wrong apartment, Wright introduced legislation that attempted reform "no knock" search warrants. Assemblyman Wright is a lifelong resident of Harlem and an active community member.

== New York County Democratic Committee ==
Wright has served as Chair of the New York County Democratic Committee since September 2009 as well as the New York County Leader for Democratic Party, when he took over from 28-year incumbent Denny Farrell.

== New York City Council Democratic Primary Upset in June 2023 and Endorsement ==
Wright supported the eventual winner of the Democratic Primary for the Harlem City Council seat in 2023, Yusef Salaam. Salaam was opposed by two members of the NY State Legislature Inez Dickens and Al Taylor.

== Bibliography ==
- John C. Walker,The Harlem Fox: J. Raymond Jones at Tammany 1920:1970, New York: State University New York Press, 1989.
- David N. Dinkins, A Mayor's Life: Governing New York's Gorgeous Mosaic, PublicAffairs Books, 2013
- Rangel, Charles B.; Wynter, Leon (2007). And I Haven't Had a Bad Day Since: From the Streets of Harlem to the Halls of Congress. New York: St. Martin's Press.
- Paterson, David Black, Blind, & In Charge: A Story of Visionary Leadership and Overcoming Adversity. New York, New York, 2020
- Baker Motley, Constance Equal Justice Under The Law: An Autobiography, New York: Farrar, Straus, and Giroux, 1998.
- Howell, Ron Boss of Black Brooklyn: The Life and Times of Bertram L. Baker Fordham University Press Bronx, New York 2018
- Jack, Hulan Fifty Years a Democrat:The Autobiography of Hulan Jack New Benjamin Franklin House New York, NY 1983
- Clayton-Powell, Adam Adam by Adam:The Autobiography of Adam Clayton Powell Jr. New York, New York 1972
- Pritchett, Wendell E. Robert Clifton Weaver and the American City: The Life and Times of an Urban Reformer Chicago: University of Chicago Press 2008
- Davis, Benjamin Communist Councilman from Harlem:Autobiographical Notes Written in a Federal Penitentiary New York, New York 1969

Party political offices
Preceded by Jay S. Jacobs	Chair of the New York Democratic Party; 2012–2014; Served alongside: Stephanie Miner	Succeeded by David Paterson
