= Jordan Wright (politician) =

American politician from New York City

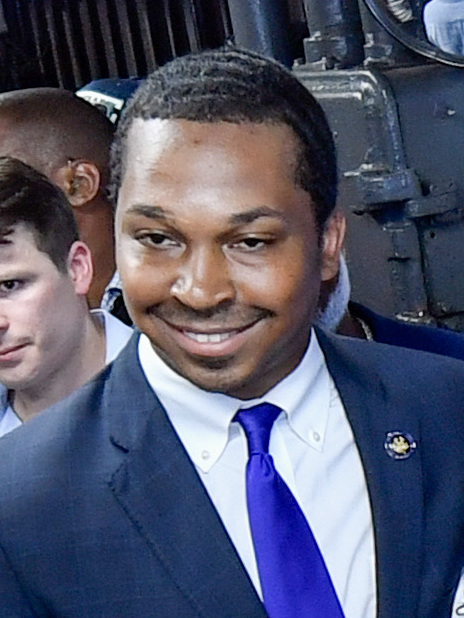
- Wright in 2025

Member of the New York State Assembly from the 70th district
- Incumbent
- Assumed office January 1, 2025
- Preceded by: Inez Dickens

Personal details
- Born: New York City, New York, U.S.
- Party: Democratic
- Relatives: Keith L. T. Wright (father); Bruce M. Wright (grandfather)
- Education: Syracuse University (BA)
- Website: Campaign website

Jordan J.G. Wright is an American politician from the state of New York. A Democrat from Harlem, he was elected to the New York State Assembly from the 70th district in 2024.

Wright is the son of Manhattan Democratic Party chairman Keith L.T. Wright.

== Political career ==
Wright first served as campaign manager during Yusef Salaam's 2023 campaign for the 9th district of the New York City Council. Following the election, Wright served as Salaam's chief of staff. In January 2024, Wright launched his Assembly campaign. He received the support of Salaam, outgoing Assembly Member Inez Dickens, Assembly Member Al Taylor of Manhattan, and former Congressman Charles Rangel. He received a plurality of votes in the June 25 Democratic primary. He then prevailed in the 2024 general election.

He is currently running for re-election to a second term.
