= Greater New York Chamber of Commerce =

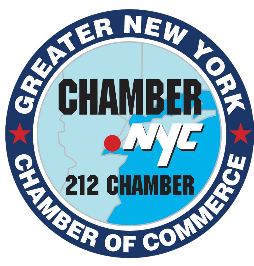
- Founded: 1994; 32 years ago
- Founder: Mark Jaffe
- Type: Advocacy group
- Purpose: Business advocacy
- Location: New York, New York
- Region served: United States industry
- Method: Political lobbying, Public relations
- Key people: Helana Natt, Executive Director
- Website: chamber.nyc

The Greater New York Chamber of Commerce is a non-profit business advocacy and networking group located in New York City and is a member of the US Chamber of Commerce Association. The Chamber's mission is to improve the business climate and quality of living in the New York Metropolitan Area for businesses, workers, residents and visitors. The Chamber hosts networking events, trade delegations, and works with the local, state, and federal government to promote the business interests of over 30,000 business and civic leaders in the New York Metropolitan Area.
