= DREAM for NYC =

New York City political organization

- Formation: February 2025
- Website: dreamfornyc.com

DREAM for NYC is a political action committee (PAC) that successfully advocated against Andrew Cuomo and Eric Adams in the 2025 New York City Democratic mayoral primary and general election. DREAM has changed what it stands for based on the election, switching from "Don't Rank Evil Andrew for Mayor" during the primary election to "Don’t Risk Evil Andrew for Mayor" in the general.

The organization previously used the slogan, "Don't Rank Eric or Andrew for Mayor", prior to the withdrawal of Eric Adams from the Democratic primary. More than half of primary voters did not rank Cuomo on their ballots, and Zohran Mamdani became the Democratic nominee.

The PAC has described itself as "the ultimate hater campaign".

== Primary campaign ==
The PAC was first founded in February 2025, and officially registered as New Yorkers for A Better New York Today. The acronym, DREAM, was first seen as "Don't Rank Eric Adams for Mayor", but was changed following Cuomo's entrance into the race. Many candidates have expressed support for the organization, including Zohran Mamdani, Jessica Ramos, Zellnor Myrie, Adrienne Adams, and Michael Blake. United Auto Workers Region 9A first expressed support for the idea, leading to further discussion of cross endorsements among candidates in the primary.

Since Eric Adams elected to run as an independent in the general election, the PAC has shifted its focus solely to Cuomo.

The Working Families Party began supporting the organization in March 2025.

DREAM conducted a poll of the Democratic primary in conjunction with the Center for Strategic Politics in June 2025.

=== Results ===
DREAM raised about $100,000 during the primary election cycle. 54% of voters in the primary did not rank Cuomo anywhere on their ballots, and Mamdani won the primary election.

== General campaign ==
With both Adams and Cuomo running as independents in the general election, in September 2025 DREAM first switched its acronym again to "Don’t Re-elect Eric or Andrew for Mayor", and then to "Don’t Risk Evil Andrew for Mayor" after Adams dropped out. DREAM is aiming to raise $300,000 for the general election.

DREAM succeeded in their goal, successfully electing Zohran Mamdani over Andrew Cuomo in the 2025 New York City mayoral election.
