= New York's 35th State Assembly district =

American legislative district

Assemblymember
Larinda Hooks; D–East Elmhurst
- Registration: 66.1% Democratic; 9.2% Republican; 22.1% No party preference
- Demographics: 9% White; 10% Black; 52% Hispanic; 27% Asian; 0% Native American; 0% Hawaiian/Pacific Islander; 1% Other
- Population (2020): 117,403
- Registered voters: 55,622

New York's 35th State Assembly district is one of the 150 districts in the New York State Assembly. It has been represented by Larinda Hooks since 2025, succeeding Jeffrion Aubry.

== Geography ==
=== 2020s ===
District 35 is located in Queens. It contains the neighborhoods of East Elmhurst, LeFrak City, and parts of Corona, Elmhurst, Rego Park, Jackson Heights, and northern Astoria. LaGuardia Airport, Citi Field and a portion of Flushing Meadows-Corona Park are part of this district.

The district overlaps New York's 6th and 14th congressional districts, as well as the 11th, 13th, 14th, 15th and 16th districts of the New York State Senate, and the 21st, 22nd, 24th, 25th and 29th districts of the New York City Council.

=== 2010s ===
District 35 is located in Queens. It contains the neighborhoods of East Elmhurst, LeFrak City, and parts of Corona, Elmhurst, and Rego Park. LaGuardia Airport, Citi Field and a portion of Flushing Meadows-Corona Park are part of this district.

== Recent election results ==
=== 2026 ===
2026 New York State Assembly election, District 35
Party	Candidate	Votes	%
Democratic	Larinda Hooks		
Working Families	Larinda Hooks		
Total	Larinda Hooks (incumbent)		
Write-in			
Total votes			100.0

=== 2024 ===
2024 New York State Assembly election, District 35
Primary election
Party	Candidate	Votes	%
Democratic	Larinda Hooks	2,128	59.1
Democratic	Hiram Monserrate	1,455	40.4
Write-in		20	0.5
Total votes		3,603	100.0
General election
Democratic	Larinda Hooks	16,178	
Working Families	Larinda Hooks	2,800	
Total	Larinda Hooks	18,978	98.7
Write-in		252	1.3
Total votes		19,230	100.0
Democratic hold			

=== 2022 ===
2022 New York State Assembly election, District 35
Primary election
Party	Candidate	Votes	%
Democratic	Jeffrion Aubry (incumbent)	2,716	62.0
Democratic	Hiram Monserrate	1,649	37.6
Write-in		17	0.4
Total votes		4,382	100.0
General election
Democratic	Jeffrion Aubry (incumbent)	10,160	98.5
Write-in		156	1.5
Total votes		10,316	100.0
Democratic hold			

=== 2020 ===
2020 New York State Assembly election, District 35
Primary election
Party	Candidate	Votes	%
Democratic	Jeffrion Aubry (incumbent)	5,197	65.1
Democratic	Hiram Monserrate	2,759	34.6
Write-in		24	0.3
Total votes		7,980	100.0
General election
Democratic	Jeffrion Aubry (incumbent)	22,631	77.6
Republican	Han-Kohn To	5,589	
Conservative	Han-Kohn To	457	
Save Our City	Han-Kohn To	366	
Total	Han-Kohn To	6,412	22.0
Write-in		129	0.4
Total votes		29,172	100.0
Democratic hold			

=== 2018 ===
2018 New York State Assembly election, District 35
Party	Candidate	Votes	%
Democratic	Jeffrion Aubry (incumbent)	16,380	99.3
Write-in		100	0.7
Total votes		16,480	100.0
Democratic hold			

=== 2016 ===
2016 New York State Assembly election, District 35
Party	Candidate	Votes	%
Democratic	Jeffrion Aubry (incumbent)	22,310	99.7
Write-in		78	0.3
Total votes		22,388	100.0
Democratic hold			

=== 2014 ===
2014 New York State Assembly election, District 35
Party	Candidate	Votes	%
Democratic	Jeffrion Aubry (incumbent)	7,474	99.6
Write-in		29	0.4
Total votes		7,503	100.0
Democratic hold			

=== 2012 ===
2012 New York State Assembly election, District 35
Party	Candidate	Votes	%
Democratic	Jeffrion Aubry	18,366	
Working Families	Jeffrion Aubry	642	
Total	Jeffrion Aubry (incumbent)	19,008	99.9
Write-in		20	0.1
Total votes		19,028	100.0
Democratic win (new boundaries)			

=== 2010 ===
2010 New York State Assembly election, District 35
Primary election
Party	Candidate	Votes	%
Democratic	Jeffrion Aubry (incumbent)	2,478	61.7
Democratic	Anthony Miranda	1,527	38.0
Write-in		13	0.3
Total votes		4,018	100.0
General election
Democratic	Jeffrion Aubry	10,143	
Working Families	Jeffrion Aubry	654	
Total	Jeffrion Aubry (incumbent)	10,797	99.8
Write-in		21	0.2
Total votes		10,818	100.0
Democratic hold			

=== 2008 ===
2008 New York State Assembly election, District 35
Party	Candidate	Votes	%
Democratic	Jeffrion Aubry (incumbent)	16,192	100.0
Write-in		0	0.0
Total votes		16,192	100.0
Democratic hold			

=== 2006 ===
2006 New York State Assembly election, District 35
Party	Candidate	Votes	%
Democratic	Jeffrion Aubry (incumbent)	8,597	100.0
Write-in		0	0.0
Total votes		8,597	100.0
Democratic hold			

=== 2004 ===
2004 New York State Assembly election, District 35
Party	Candidate	Votes	%
Democratic	Jeffrion Aubry	15,495	
Working Families	Jeffrion Aubry	523	
Total	Jeffrion Aubry (incumbent)	16,018	100.0
Write-in		0	0.0
Total votes		16,018	100.0
Democratic hold			

=== 2002 ===
2002 New York State Assembly election, District 35
Party	Candidate	Votes	%
Democratic	Jeffrion Aubry	8,087	
Working Families	Jeffrion Aubry	244	
Liberal	Jeffrion Aubry	173	
Total	Jeffrion Aubry (incumbent)	8,504	100.0
Write-in		1	0.0
Total votes		8,505	100.0
Democratic hold			

=== 2000 ===
2000 New York State Assembly election, District 35
Party	Candidate	Votes	%
Democratic	Jeffrion Aubry	16,289	
Liberal	Jeffrion Aubry	342	
Total	Jeffrion Aubry (incumbent)	16,631	100.0
Write-in		1	0.0
Total votes		16,632	100.0

=== Federal results in Assembly District 35 ===
Year	Office	Results
2024	President	Harris 56.4 - 42.2%
2024	Senate	Gillibrand 61.5 - 37.6%
2022	Senate	Schumer 69.4 - 30.0%
2020	President	Biden 74.6 - 24.5%
2018	Senate	Gillibrand 88.4 - 11.6%
2016	President	Clinton 83.2 - 14.4%
2016	Senate	Schumer 87.0 - 11.0%
2012	President	Obama 87.1 - 12.3%
2012	Senate	Gillibrand 89.6 - 9.6%
