= Do you condemn Hamas? =

Question in Israel–Palestine debates

"Do you condemn Hamas?" is a question that has been widespread in formal and informal debates concerning the Israeli–Palestinian conflict. Pro-Israeli advocates have often directed the question at pro-Palestinian advocates, including in response to criticism of Israel.

Critics have said that the question prioritizes the suffering of Jews over Palestinian suffering, or that supporters of Israel have used it to frame complex political issues as a morally charged binary choice, deflect scrutiny of Israel's actions against Palestinians, and discredit critics by portraying them as sympathetic to Hamas or antisemitic. For others, it is a legitimate question that addresses what they perceive as a moral failure on the part of those who do not vocalize condemnation of Hamas.

== History ==
=== Background ===
The flag of Hamas, which has governed the Gaza Strip since taking power from Fatah during the Battle of Gaza after winning the 2006 Palestinian legislative election

On 11 May 2010, American conservative writer David Horowitz directed the question to a student at the University of California, San Diego (UCSD). The student who confronted Horowitz was a member of UCSD's Muslim Student Association, then holding Justice in Palestine Week, which students said Horowitz had referred to as "Hitler Youth Week". The student responded to Horowitz’s question: "...if I say something I'm sure that I will be arrested, for reasons of Homeland Security ... If I support Hamas, because your question forces me to condemn Hamas. If I support Hamas, I look really bad." When Horowitz asked if the student was "for or against" what he claimed was Hezbollah's stated ambition to hunt down Jews globally, the student answered that they were "for it".

Aleksandra Zorić at the University of Belgrade has described a general "Do you condemn X?" question as a "sophisticated linguistic tool", carefully calibrated to function as a performative speech act. She argues that, by forcing respondents into a rigid ideological box, the question serves not merely as a "demand for a moral stance" but also as a means of narrative control and ideological enforcement, turning complex political issues into exercises of public shaming rather than encouraging open inquiry, while pushing other relevant issues out of the frame. In regards to the question on whether one condemns Hamas, Zorić wrote:

the question serves as a tool used for framing. It reduces a complex event with deep historical, political, and social context to a single, morally charged binary choice: condemnation or support. In doing so, all other relevant frames, such as “occupation,” “social injus-tice,” “a tragedy caused by corruption,” or “police brutality”, are delegated to the background, rendered invisible, or presented as irrelevant.

Zorić describes the technique as a language game with a demand phrased as a question containing a persuasive definition by the questioner, concluding that it can "erode trust in the media and politicians, deepen polarization, and make nuanced and constructive debate on complex issues impossible. Public discourse is reduced to performative virtue signaling and moral posturing, where the goal is to discredit an opponent, not to understand the problem."

=== Since 2023 ===
Some pro-Palestinian demonstrators described the question to reporter Andrew Silverstein as a tactic to start the narrative of the Israeli–Palestinian conflict at the October 7 attacks, omitting the events of preceding decades, "meant to shut down discussion". Mondoweiss writer James Ray stated that he did not condemn Hamas, though he criticized the question as "muddling" expressions of solidarity and obscuring what he calls a "colonial context" of "Palestinian resistance". In 2024, Gazan dissident and anti-Hamas organizer Rami Aman said that being asked the question was an insult to his person and his life.

Writing in The Nation, Sasha Abramsky wrote that leftists who fail to condemn Hamas and the October 7 attacks are failing morally.

Ariel Koren, an anti-Zionist acitivist, said The Guardian forced her to include condemnation of the October 7 Hamas attack in her October 2023 op-ed arguing that Israel was pursuing genocide in Gaza.

Piers Morgan has been criticized for his frequent use of the question at the beginning of interviews with pro-Palestinian guests on his show Piers Morgan Uncensored, by Mehdi Hasan, Bassem Youssef, and others. Writing in Middle East Eye Mohamad Elmasry has described Morgan's use of the question as an example of journalistic frame setting, in which the journalist establishes the tone of the story according to their point-of-view:

"If guests agree with Morgan that Hamas should be condemned, a Palestinian source of evil and conflict has been established from the interview's outset, and Israel's bombing campaign in Gaza is given justification. If guests refuse to condemn Hamas, however, Morgan can demonise them for failing to denounce 'terrorists'."

Morgan used former British Labour Party leader Jeremy Corbyn's response to the question on his show to later delegitimize Corbyn's observation that "many in our media are finally waking up to the unspeakable horrors that Palestinians are enduring in Gaza."

== See also ==
- Litmus test (politics)
- Overton window
- "You are either with us, or against us"
