= New York's 70th State Assembly district =

American legislative district

Assemblymember
Jordan Wright; D–Harlem

New York's 70th State Assembly district is one of the 150 districts in the New York State Assembly. It has been represented by Jordan Wright since 2025, succeeding Inez Dickens. In 2024, she announced she would not seek re-election.

== Geography ==
District 70 is in Manhattan. The district includes portions of El Barrio, Hamilton Heights, Harlem, and Morningside Heights. A portion of Columbia University's campus, the main campus of City College, Morningside Park and the Apollo Theater are within this district.

The district is entirely within New York's 13th congressional district, and New York's 30th State Senate district. It also overlaps the 7th and 9th districts of the New York City Council.

== Recent election results ==
=== 2026 ===
2026 New York State Assembly election, District 70
Primary election
Party	Candidate	Votes	%
Democratic	Jordan Wright (incumbent)	9,152	54.9
Democratic	Conrad Blackburn	7,456	44.7
Write-in		75	0.4
Total votes		16,683	100.0
General election
Democratic	Jordan Wright (incumbent)		
Write-in			
Total votes			100.0

=== 2024 ===
2024 New York State Assembly election, District 70
Primary election
Party	Candidate	Votes	%
Democratic	Jordan Wright	4,199	48.3
Democratic	Maria Ordonez	2,589	29.8
Democratic	Shana Harmongoff	1,443	16.6
Democratic	Craig Schley	427	4.9
Write-in		29	0.4
Total votes		8,687	100.0
General election
Democratic	Jordan Wright	41,529	91.0
Republican	Seson Adams	3,989	8.7
Write-in		140	0.3
Total votes		45,658	100.0
Democratic hold			

=== 2022 ===
2022 New York State Assembly election, District 70
Primary election
Party	Candidate	Votes	%
Democratic	Inez Dickens (incumbent)	6,588	59.7
Democratic	Delsenia Glover	3,322	30.1
Democratic	Shawanna Vaughn	1,095	9.9
Write-in		30	0.3
Total votes		11,035	100.0
General election
Democratic	Inez Dickens (incumbent)	27,501	92.4
Republican	Cynthia Nelson-Acevedo	2,124	7.1
Write-in		135	0.5
Total votes		29,760	100.0
Democratic hold			

=== 2020 ===
2020 New York State Assembly election, District 70
Party	Candidate	Votes	%
Democratic	Inez Dickens (incumbent)	47,079	90.2
Schley for 70th Assembly	Craig Schley	4,969	9.5
Write-in		142	0.3
Total votes		52,190	100.0
Democratic hold			

=== 2018 ===
2018 New York State Assembly election, District 70
Party	Candidate	Votes	%
Democratic	Inez Dickens (incumbent)	40,447	99.3
Write-in		278	0.3
Total votes		40,725	100.0
Democratic hold			

=== 2016 ===
2016 New York State Assembly election, District 70
Party	Candidate	Votes	%
Democratic	Inez Dickens	45,048	92.7
Republican	Heather Tarrant	2,316	
Independence	Heather Tarrant	648	
Reform	Heather Tarrant	485	
Total	Heather Tarrant	3,449	7.1
Write-in		99	0.2
Total votes		48,596	100.0
Democratic hold			

=== 2014 ===
2014 New York State Assembly election, District 70
Party	Candidate	Votes	%
Democratic	Keith L. T. Wright	16,313	
Working Families	Keith L. T. Wright	1,848	
Total	Keith L. T. Wright (incumbent)	18,161	96.1
Republican	Noni Moore	700	3.7
Write-in		40	0.2
Total votes		18,901	100.0
Democratic hold			

=== 2012 ===
2012 New York State Assembly election, District 70
Party	Candidate	Votes	%
Democratic	Keith L. T. Wright	39,025	
Working Families	Keith L. T. Wright	1,328	
Total	Keith L. T. Wright (incumbent)	40,353	99.9
Write-in		50	0.1
Total votes		40,403	100.0
Democratic hold			

=== 2010 ===
2010 New York State Assembly election, District 70
Party	Candidate	Votes	%
Democratic	Keith L. T. Wright	20,567	
Working Families	Keith L. T. Wright	1,434	
Total	Keith L. T. Wright (incumbent)	22,001	95.9
Republican	Dexter Davis	924	4.0
Write-in		24	0.1
Total votes		22,949	100.0
Democratic hold			
