= Michelle Caruso-Cabrera =

American politician & journalist (born 1969)

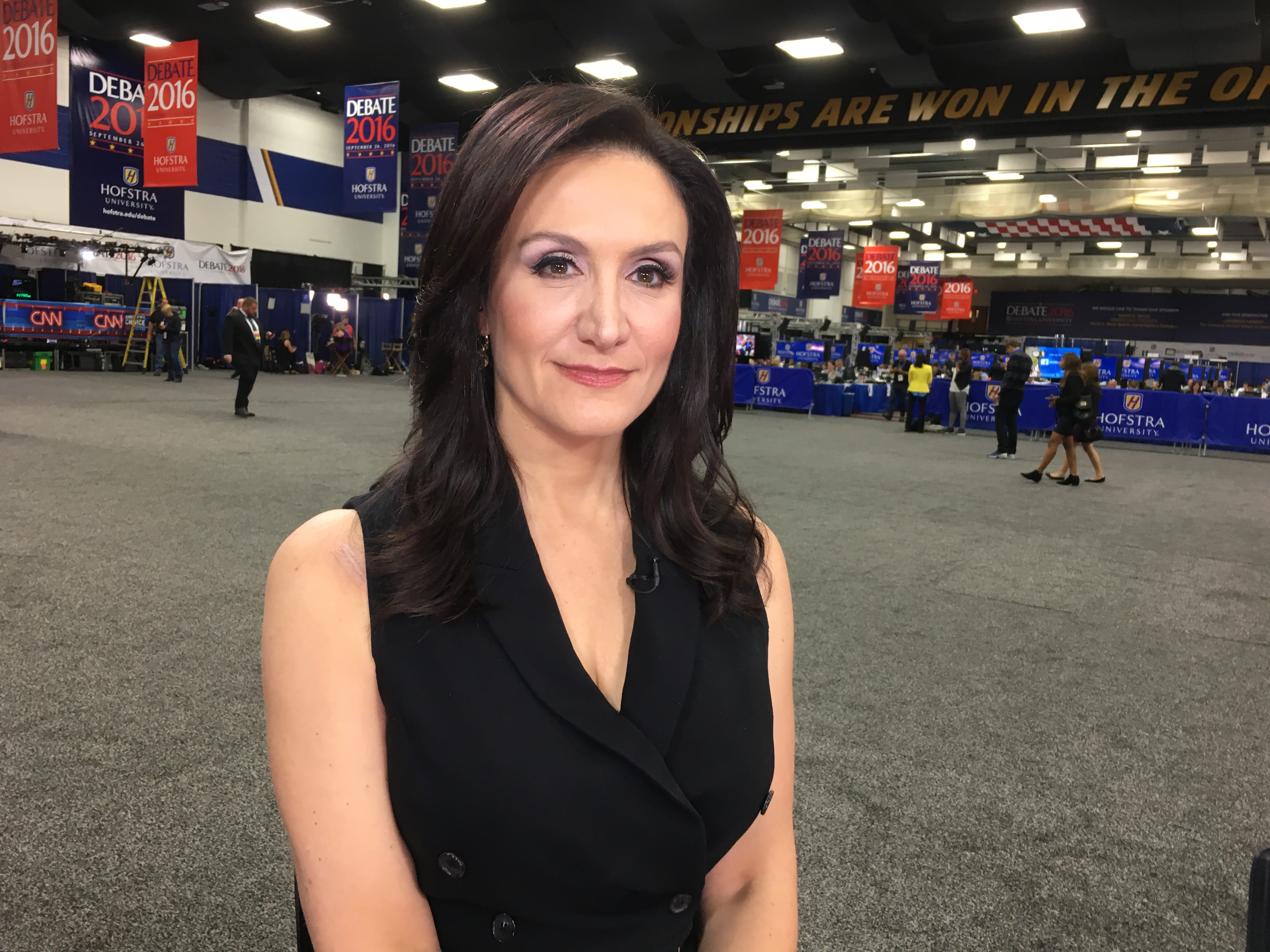
- Born: February 9, 1969 (age 57); Dayton, Ohio, U.S.
- Education: Wellesley College (BA)
- Political party: Republican (before 2015); Democratic (2016–present)
- Other political affiliations: Serve America Movement (2020)
- Spouses: Paulo Lima (divorced) Stephen Dizard (m. 2014)
- Awards: National Association of Hispanic Journalists Broadcast Journalist of the Year (2004)

Michelle Caruso-Cabrera (born February 9, 1969) is an American journalist, board member and former politician. She was CNBC's first Latina anchor at and first Chief International Correspondent regular and is now a CNBC contributor, where she has worked for more than twenty years.

Caruso-Cabrera challenged incumbent representative Alexandria Ocasio-Cortez in the 2020 Democratic primary for New York's 14th congressional district, which covers portions of the Bronx and Queens. She unsuccessfully ran for the Democratic nomination for the 2021 New York City Comptroller election.

== Early life and education ==
Caruso-Cabrera was born in Dayton, Ohio, and raised in Nashua, New Hampshire. Her mother is a Cuban immigrant and her grandparents were Italian and Cuban immigrants. She graduated from Nashua High School in 1987. She attended Wellesley College ('91) in Massachusetts, paying her tuition in part with the help of a National Merit Scholarship and her earnings from her first summer job as a waitress at Pizza Hut. She obtained a bachelor's degree in Economics and Spanish. Prior to graduation, she was elected editor of the college newspaper, and starting in 1991 she worked as a stringer for The New York Times, reporting for the education section.

== Career ==
=== Journalism ===
==== Univision and WTSP ====
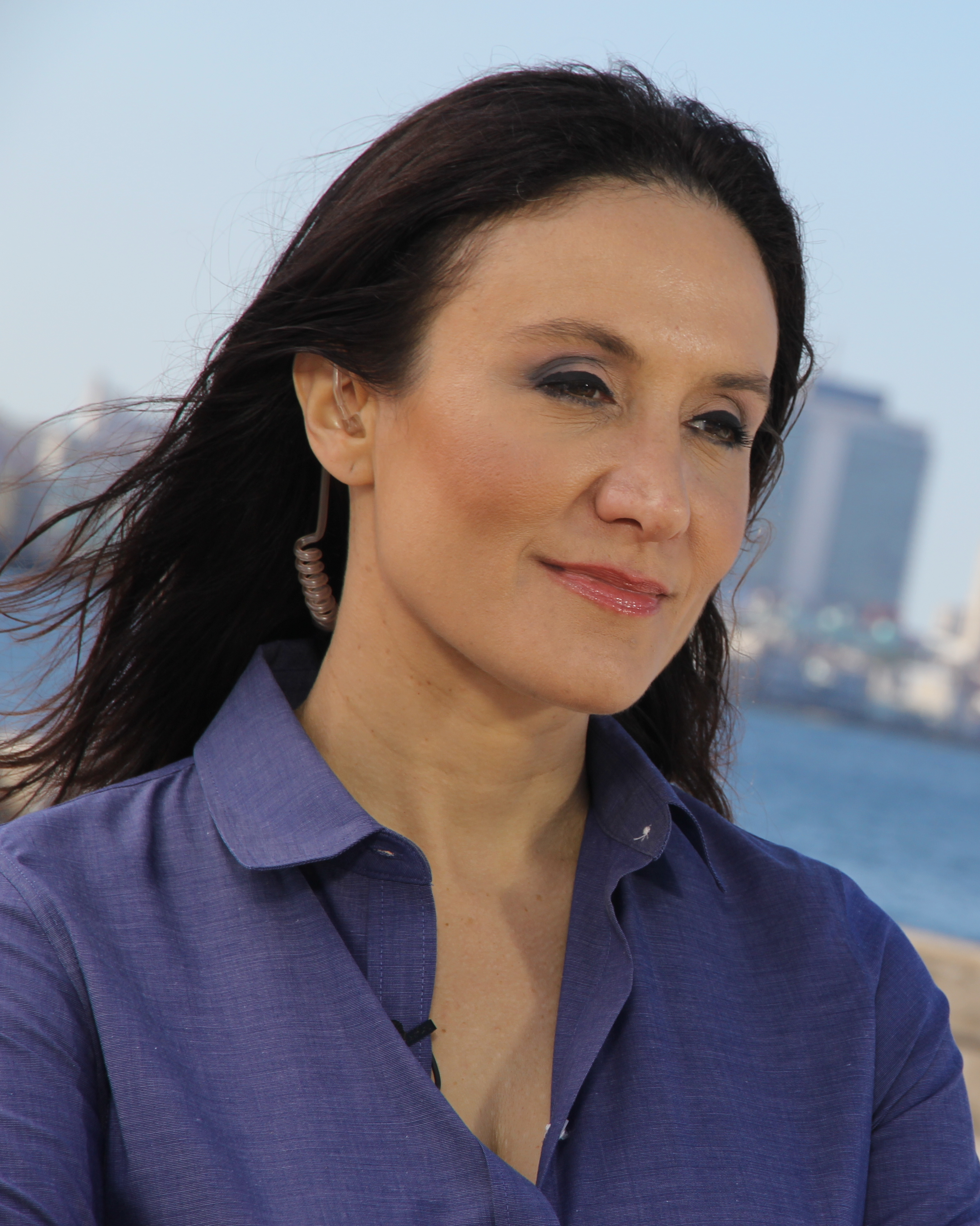
Michelle Caruso-Cabrera

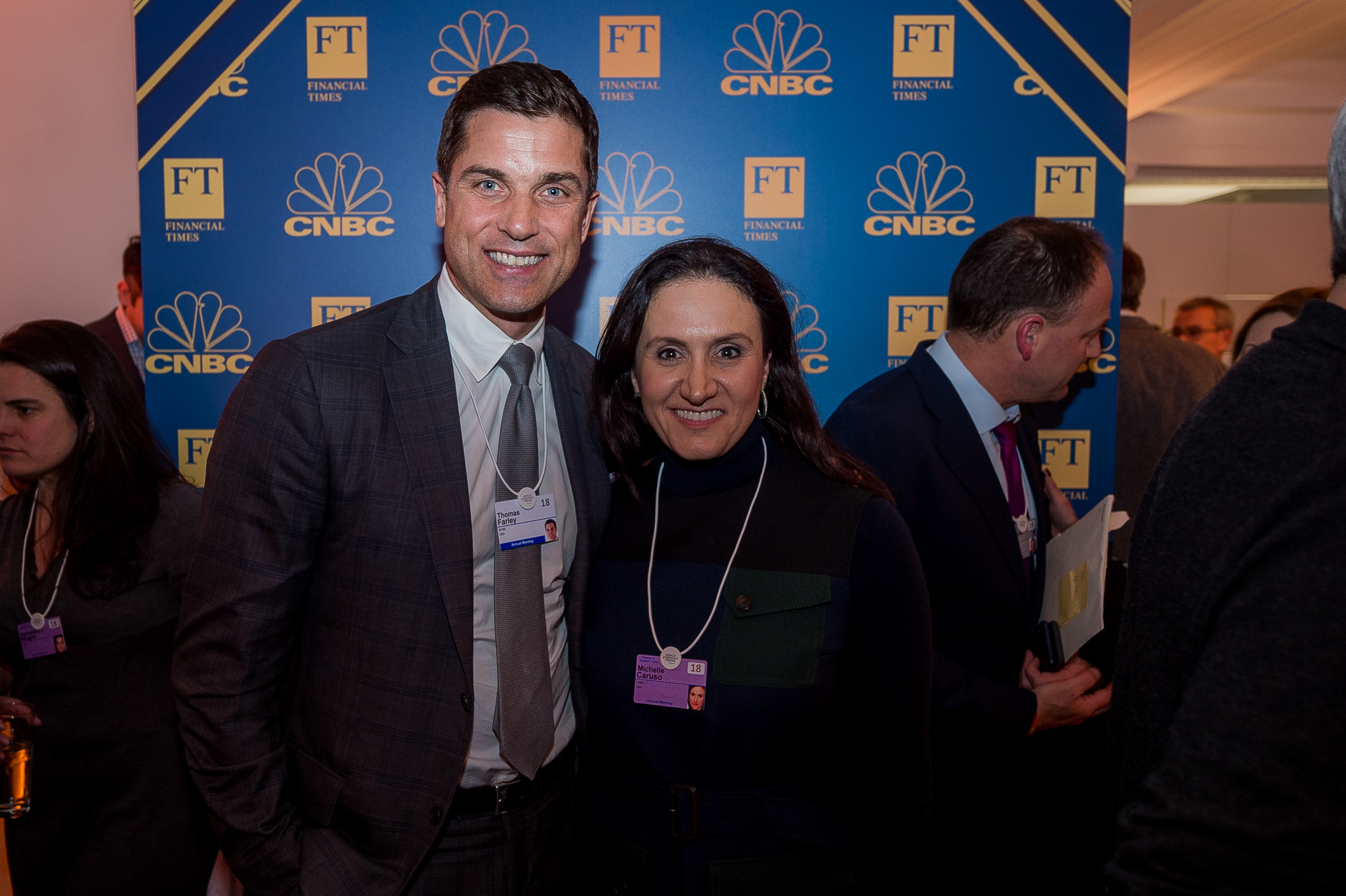
Caruso-Cabrera with Thomas Farley in 2018

Caruso-Cabrera was a researcher and later a special projects producer for Univision from 1991 to 1994. She then worked as a reporter for WTSP in St. Petersburg, Florida, from 1994 to 1998.

==== CNBC ====
She joined CNBC in August 1998, working there until January 2019, and became the network's first Hispanic anchor in 2001. She reported from all over the world including places such as Iran, Ukraine, Cuba, Russia and Israel. Caruso-Cabrera has interviewed people such as Pitbull, Lucas Papademos, Juan Manuel Santos and Nayib Bukele.

Caruso-Cabrera co-anchored Power Lunch with Bill Griffeth from 2002 to 2003. She co-hosted the Worldwide Exchange program in 2005-07, along with Christine Tan in Asia and Ross Westgate in Europe. Caruso-Cabrera was promoted to co-presenter of Power Lunch in 2009, and remained in that position until 2013. She rejoined Power Lunch for another stint as co-presenter in 2016.

She left CNBC in September 2018 to join the board of directors of a Dallas, Texas, financial firm. Caruso-Cabrera held that position until February 2020. Caruso-Cabrera is currently a CNBC contributor.

=== Book ===
In 2010, Caruso-Cabrera wrote a book called You Know I'm Right: More Prosperity, Less Government. In it, she called for the elimination of both Social Security and Medicare, which she characterized as "pyramid schemes", and expressed numerous other conservative positions. In addition, she proposed creating personal savings accounts saying they would lead people to work longer, and converting Medicare into a corporate-type 401(k) plan. The book has a foreword by CNBC colleague Larry Kudlow. In 2020, Caruso-Cabrera tweeted, "I support Medicare and social security-its important to take care fo [sic] the most vulnerable. Medicare for all is taking health insurance away from people who have health insurance that they already like."

=== Politics ===
A registered member of the Republican Party through 2015, Caruso-Cabrera switched and registered as a Democrat in 2016.

==== 2020 US House campaign ====
Caruso-Cabrera filed official paperwork on February 10, 2020, challenging freshman Representative Alexandria Ocasio-Cortez in the Democratic primary for New York's 14th congressional district, which covers portions of the Bronx and Queens. Caruso-Cabrera was endorsed by what Politico called the "traditionally conservative" United States Chamber of Commerce, a business lobbying group that generally backs Republicans. On April 8, her staff reported that Caruso-Cabrera's campaign had raised $1 million, and it was reported that over four dozen finance industry professionals, including private equity executives and investment bankers, had made early donations to Caruso-Cabrera. In the primary she received 11,337 votes, 18.2% of the vote, finishing in second place.

Caruso-Cabrera ran in the general election on the ticket of the Serve America Movement, a party with 349 registered members in New York. She received 2,000 votes, 0.9% of the vote, finishing in third place.

==== 2021 NYC Comptroller campaign ====
Caruso-Cabrera ran for election in the 2021 New York City Comptroller race. She ran in the Democratic primary against among others NYS Senator Brian Benjamin, entrepreneur and former US Marine Zach Iscol, NYC Councilmember Brad Lander, NYS Senator Kevin Parker, and NYS Assemblymember David Weprin.

She finished 3rd in the 10-person race, making it to the second-to-last round.

== Personal life ==
As of 2007 she was married to Paulo Lima, and lived in Northern New Jersey. Caruso-Cabrera married her second husband Stephen Dizard, in 2014. After living for several years in Manhattan, in 2019 she moved with her husband to Sunnyside, Queens.

=== Awards ===
Caruso-Cabrera won an Emmy Award for a five-part series on children with AIDS. She received a Broadcast Journalist of the Year (2004) award from the National Association of Hispanic Journalists. She was named one of the 100 most influential Hispanics by Hispanic magazine.

=== Boards and Directorships ===
She sits on the International Advisory Board of the Instituto Empressa, and serves as President of the Board of Directors of Ballet Hispánico in NYC. She is a member of the Council of Foreign Relations, the Economic Club of NY, and the Latino Corporate Directors Association. In 2023, she joined the board of directors of Wendy’s and Del Real Foods.

== Electoral history ==
2020 New York's 14th congressional district Democratic primary
Party	Candidate	Votes	%
Democratic	Alexandria Ocasio-Cortez (incumbent)	46,577	74.6
Democratic	Michelle Caruso-Cabrera	11,337	18.2
Democratic	Badrun Khan	3,119	5.0
Democratic	Sam Sloan	1,406	2.3
Total votes		62,439	100.0

2020 New York's 14th congressional district general election
Party	Candidate	Votes	%
Democratic	Alexandria Ocasio-Cortez (incumbent)	152,661	71.6
Republican	John Cummings	52,477	24.6
Conservative	John Cummings	5,963	2.8
Total	John Cummings	58,440	27.4
SAM	Michelle Caruso-Cabrera	2,000	0.9
Total votes		213,101	100.0
Democratic hold			

2021 New York City Comptroller Democratic primary election
Party	Candidate	Maximum round	Maximum votes	Share in maximum round	Maximum votes First round votes Transfer votes
Democratic	Brad Lander	10	340,944	51.9%	
Democratic	Corey Johnson	10	315,649	48.1%	
Democratic	Michelle Caruso-Cabrera	9	165,543	22.2%	
Democratic	Brian Benjamin	8	90,459	11.6%	
Democratic	David Weprin	7	75,133	8.9%	
Democratic	Kevin Parker	6	55,765	6.9%	
Democratic	Reshma Patel	5	51,608	6.0%	
Democratic	Zach Iscol	4	29,291	3.3%	
Democratic	Alex Pan	3	24,865	2.6%	
Democratic	Terri Liftin	2	9,993	1.1%	
Write-in		1	1,791	0.2%	

== See also ==
- 2020 United States House of Representatives elections in New York
- New Yorkers in journalism
