= Grodenchik =

Grodenchik is a surname. Notable people with the name include:

- Barry Grodenchik (born 1960), New York City Council member
- Max Grodénchik (born 1952), American stage, film, and television actor, brother of Barry
