= New York's 24th State Assembly district =

Assemblymember
David Weprin; D–Hollis
- Registration: 63.1% Democratic; 10.9% Republican; 23.2% No party preference
- Demographics: 20% White; 13% Black; 20% Hispanic; 36% Asian; 1% Native American; 0% Hawaiian/Pacific Islander; 6% Other; 3% Multiracial
- Population (2020): 132,205
- Registered voters: 73,414

New York's 24th State Assembly district is one of the 150 districts in the New York State Assembly in the United States. It has been represented by Democrat David Weprin since 2010.

== Geography ==
=== 2020s ===
District 24 is located in Queens, comprising the neighborhoods of Richmond Hill and parts of Briarwood, Jamaica Estates, Jamaica Hills, Hollis and Oakland Gardens.

The district overlaps with New York's 3rd, 5th and 6th congressional districts, the 10th, 11th, 14th, 15th and 16th districts of the New York State Senate, and the 23rd, 24th, 28th and 29th districts of the New York City Council.

=== 2010s ===
District 24 is located in Queens, comprising the neighborhoods of Jamaica Hills and parts of Hollis, Glen Oaks, Richmond Hill, Queens Village, and Jamaica.

== Recent election results ==
=== 2026 ===
2026 New York State Assembly election, District 24
Party	Candidate	Votes	%
Democratic	David Weprin (incumbent)		
Republican	Welson Chang		
Queens United	Welson Chang		
Total	Welson Chang		
Write-in			
Total votes			100.0

=== 2024 ===
2024 New York State Assembly election, District 24
Party	Candidate	Votes	%
Democratic	David Weprin (incumbent)	23,300	61.1
Republican	Ruben Cruz II	12,313	
Conservative	Ruben Cruz II	883	
Common Sense	Ruben Cruz II	187	
Total	Ruben Cruz II	13,383	35.1
People First	Misbah Mahmood	1,325	3.5
Write-in		131	0.3
Total votes		38,139	100.0
Democratic hold			

=== 2022 ===
2022 New York State Assembly election, District 24
Primary election
Party	Candidate	Votes	%
Democratic	David Weprin (incumbent)	3,558	65.8
Democratic	Albert Baldeo	939	17.4
Democratic	Mizanur Choudhury	896	16.5
Write-in		18	0.3
Total votes		5,411	100.0
General election
Democratic	David Weprin (incumbent)	15,897	98.7
Write-in		211	1.3
Total votes		16,108	100.0
Democratic hold			

=== 2020 ===
2020 New York State Assembly election, District 24
Primary election
Party	Candidate	Votes	%
Democratic	David Weprin (incumbent)	4,329	50.4
Democratic	Albert Baldeo	1,693	19.7
Democratic	Mahfuzul Islam	2,540	29.6
Write-in		24	0.3
Total votes		8,586	100.0
General election
Democratic	David Weprin (incumbent)	34,000	99.2
Write-in		276	0.8
Total votes		34,276	100.0
Democratic hold			

=== 2018 ===
2018 New York State Assembly election, District 24
Party	Candidate	Votes	%
Democratic	David Weprin (incumbent)	22,410	99.3
Write-in		148	0.7
Total votes		22,558	100.0
Democratic hold			

=== 2016 ===
2016 New York State Assembly election, District 24
Party	Candidate	Votes	%
Democratic	David Weprin (incumbent)	30,036	82.6
Republican	Ira Harris	6,304	17.3
Write-in		22	0.6
Total votes		36,362	100.0
Democratic hold			

=== 2014 ===
2014 New York State Assembly election, District 24
Party	Candidate	Votes	%
Democratic	David Weprin	9,768	
Working Families	David Weprin	1,035	
Total	David Weprin (incumbent)	10,803	99.3
Write-in		71	0.7
Total votes		10,874	100.0
Democratic hold			

=== 2012 ===
2012 New York State Assembly election, District 24
Party	Candidate	Votes	%
Democratic	David Weprin	24,894	
Working Families	David Weprin	828	
Independence	David Weprin	636	
Total	David Weprin (incumbent)	26,358	99.8
Write-in		58	0.2
Total votes		26,416	100.0
Democratic hold			

=== 2010 general ===
2010 New York State Assembly election, District 24
Primary election
Party	Candidate	Votes	%
Democratic	David Weprin (incumbent)	4,586	69.5
Democratic	Bob Friedrich	2,006	30.4
Write-in		6	0.1
Total votes		6,598	100.0
General election
Democratic	David Weprin	16,631	
Working Families	David Weprin	1,186	
Total	David Weprin (incumbent)	17,817	69.8
Republican	Timothy Furey	5,567	21.8
Conservative	Bob Friedrich	2,145	8.4
Write-in		9	0.0
Total votes		25,538	100.0
Democratic hold			

=== 2010 special ===
Incumbent Mark Weprin resigned his seat on December 31, 2009 to serve in the New York City Council, triggering a special election. In special elections for state legislative offices, primaries are usually not held – county committee members and district leaders for each party select nominees. Election was held on February 9th, 2010.

2010 New York State Assembly special election, District 24
Party	Candidate	Votes	%
Democratic	David Weprin	4,047	
Independence	David Weprin	241	
Working Families	David Weprin	177	
Total	David Weprin	4,465	61.8
Republican	Bob Friedrich	2,184	
Conservative	Bob Friedrich	573	
Total	Bob Friedrich	2,757	38.2
Write-in		0	0.0
Total votes		7,222	100.0
Democratic hold			

=== 2008 ===
2008 New York State Assembly election, District 24
Party	Candidate	Votes	%
Democratic	Mark Weprin	27,908	
Working Families	Mark Weprin	1,201	
Total	Mark Weprin (incumbent)	29,109	100.0
Write-in		3	0.0
Total votes		29,112	100.0
Democratic hold			

=== 2006 ===
2006 New York State Assembly election, District 24
Party	Candidate	Votes	%
Democratic	Mark Weprin	18,159	
Working Families	Mark Weprin	1,147	
Total	Mark Weprin (incumbent)	19,306	100.0
Write-in		5	0.0
Total votes		19,311	100.0
Democratic hold			

=== 2004 ===
2004 New York State Assembly election, District 24
Party	Candidate	Votes	%
Democratic	Mark Weprin	28,995	
Working Families	Mark Weprin	1,236	
Total	Mark Weprin (incumbent)	30,231	100.0
Write-in		2	0.0
Total votes		30,233	100.0
Democratic hold			

=== 2002 ===
2002 New York State Assembly election, District 24
Party	Candidate	Votes	%
Democratic	Mark Weprin	17,372	
Liberal	Mark Weprin	514	
Working Families	Mark Weprin	482	
Total	Mark Weprin (incumbent)	18,368	74.6
Republican	Stacey Kaplan-Vila	5,120	
Conservative	Stacey Kaplan-Vila	710	
Independence	Stacey Kaplan-Vila	408	
Total	Stacey Kaplan-Vila	6,238	25.4
Write-in		0	0.0
Total votes		24,606	100.0
Democratic hold			

=== 2000 ===
2000 New York State Assembly election, District 24
Party	Candidate	Votes	%
Democratic	Mark Weprin	27,142	
Liberal	Mark Weprin	730	
Total	Mark Weprin (incumbent)	27,872	75.4
Republican	Philip Sica	7,951	
Conservative	Philip Sica	829	
Right to Life	Philip Sica	309	
Total	Philip Sica	9,089	24.6
Write-in		0	0.0
Total votes		36,961	100.0
Democratic hold			
