= David Weprin =

American politician

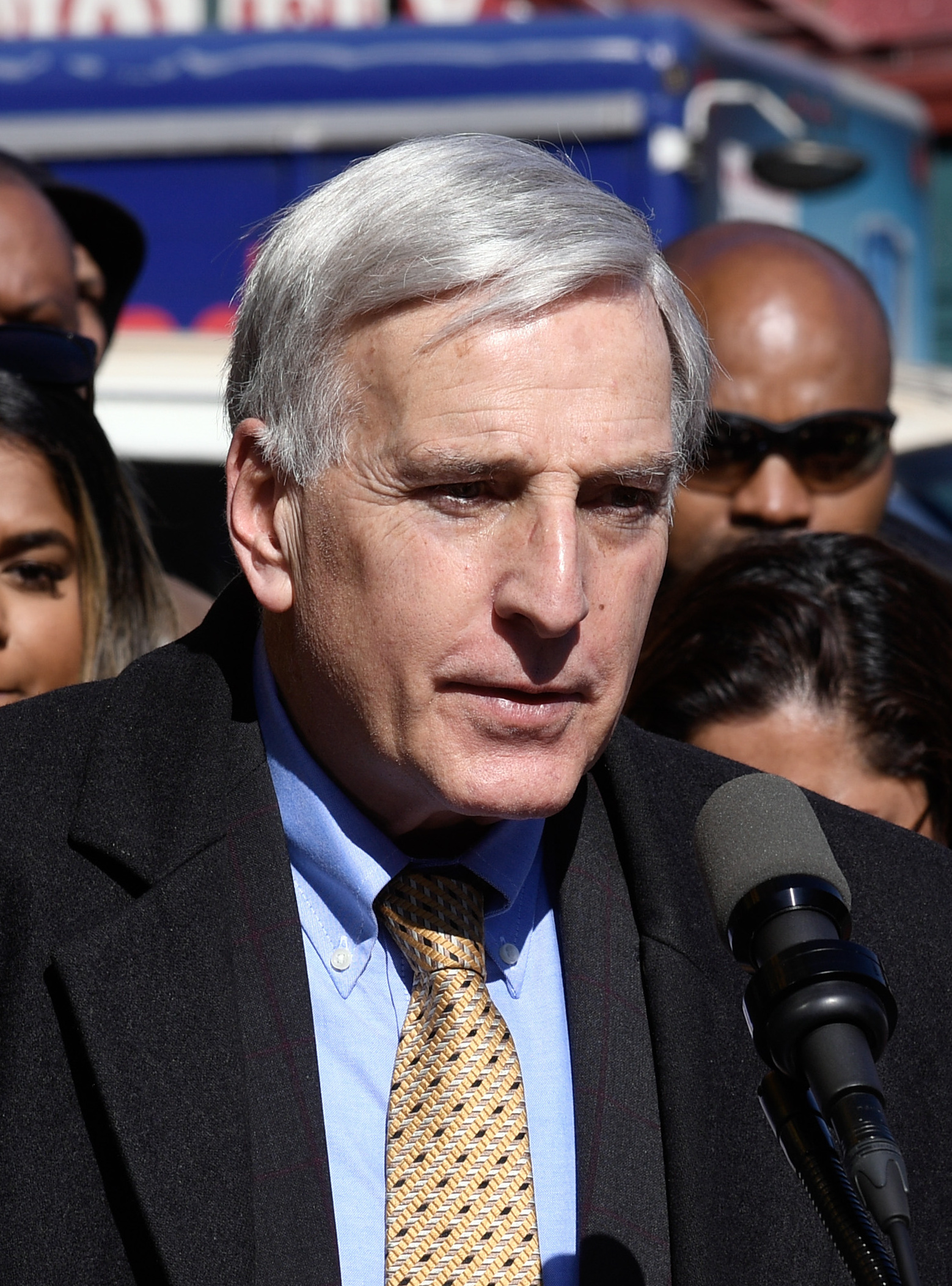
- Weprin in 2024

Member of the New York State Assembly from the 24th district
- Incumbent
- Assumed office February 9, 2010
- Preceded by: Mark Weprin

Member of the New York City Council from the 23rd district
- In office January 1, 2002 – December 31, 2009
- Preceded by: Sheldon S. Leffler
- Succeeded by: Mark Weprin

Personal details
- Born: David Ira Weprin; May 2, 1956 (age 70) New York City, New York, U.S.
- Party: Democratic
- Spouses: Roselyn Weisstuch (divorced); Ronni (m. 1990)
- Relatives: Saul Weprin (father); Mark Weprin (brother)
- Education: State University of New York, Albany (BA); Hofstra University (JD)
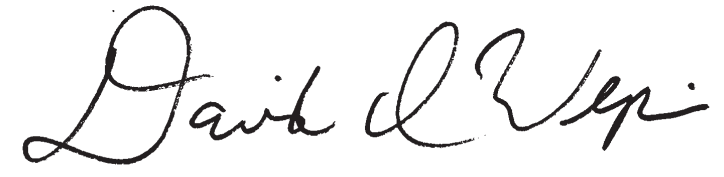
- Signature
- Website: State Assembly website

David Ira Weprin (born May 2, 1956) is a Democratic member of the New York State Assembly, representing District 24 in Queens since 2010, when he replaced his brother Mark. In the Assembly he has supported progressive causes, such as a surcharge on millionaires, and granting immediate parole to prisoners who have reached 55 years of age and served 15 years in prison, regardless of their sentence. He was previously a member of the New York City Council, representing the 23rd district. He is also a former Deputy Superintendent of the NY State Banking Commission (1983–87).

In 2009, Weprin lost in the Democratic primary for NYC Comptroller, coming in last with 10.6% of the vote. In 2011, Weprin lost a special election to Republican Bob Turner to fill Anthony Weiner's former seat in New York's 9th congressional district in the US House of Representatives, with 46% of the vote; the first time a Democrat had not won the district in 88 years.

== Early life and education ==
Weprin was born in Queens, is Jewish, and comes from a family of Democratic politicians. His parents were Sylvia (Matz), an immigrant from Havana, Cuba, and NY State Assembly Speaker Saul Weprin, and his younger brother Mark Weprin is a former NY State Assemblyman and former NYC Councilman. Weprin has lived in the Hollis-Jamaica area of Queens his entire life. He is a graduate of Jamaica High School ('72).

He received a bachelor's degree in political science from the State University of New York at Albany in 1976. He then received a J.D. degree from Hofstra Law School in 1980, and was admitted to the New York bar in 1981.

== Career ==
=== Early career ===
In 1983, two years after Weprin was admitted to the bar, then-Governor Mario Cuomo, who was a close family friend and neighbor whom Weprin viewed as family, named him the Deputy Superintendent of Banks and Secretary of the Banking Board for New York State. The position was responsible for regulating financial firms in New York State. Weprin stepped down from the role in 1987.

Weprin next held a variety of positions at the Stern Brothers investment banking firm (as a vice president), Advest, Pearson, Donaldson, Lufkin & Jenrette; Kidder Peabody; Paine Webber, and Sterne, Agee & Leach. While in the private sector, he was elected to serve as Chairman of the Securities Industry Association New York District for three years, from 1997 to 2000.

In 2001, Weprin was elected to the New York City Council, representing a northeast Queens district; he served from 2002 until 2009. He served as Chairman of the Council's Finance Committee. During his time as a Council Member, was a leading opponent in the Council against Mayor Bloomberg's congestion pricing plan, which he characterized as "an unfair tax" with "the potential for causing hardship to people who rely on their cars in boroughs other than Manhattan".

=== 2009 NYC Comptroller campaign ===
In 2009, Weprin retired from the City Council to run for New York City Comptroller. He finished last in the Democratic primary, with 10.6% of the vote, behind Melinda Katz, David Yassky, and John Liu—the eventual nominee and winner of the general election.

Weprin was penalized $28,184 in total penalties, and $325,561 in matching public funds repayments (of the $929,000 it collected in public funds), after the New York City Campaign Finance Board (CFB) determined that his campaign for comptroller had been plagued with a dozen violations. His offenses included accepting over-the-limit donations, accepting donations from unregistered political action committees, failing to file disclosure statements, failing to provide bank statements, making improper post-election expenditures, and failing to report transactions. His spokesperson said that since the campaign entity and its funds no longer existed, there was no entity to pay the penalties and repayments. However, Weprin and his campaign treasurer were still jointly liable for settling the $28,184 in penalties, and Weprin paid those penalties. Weprin would have to repay the $325,561 in public funds before he could receive any public funds for another city election; as of 2016, he had not repaid the monies.

=== NY State Assembly ===
On February 9, 2010, Weprin won a special election to replace his brother Mark to represent New York State Assembly's District 24. He won the general election the following November with 67 percent of the vote, running on both the Democratic and the Working Families tickets. This seat was held by his brother and father before him. In his most recent Democratic primary in June 2020, he won with 50.4% of the vote, and then went on to win the general election. He has a record of supporting major progressive causes, such as a surcharge on millionaires.

As chairman of the Assembly's Correction Committee, he worked to reform the Rockefeller drug laws and reduce the number of prisoners in New York State prisons. He has proposed granting immediate parole to prisoners who have reached 55 years of age and served 15 years in prison, regardless of their health status and no matter what their sentence is—even prisoners with life sentences. He has also proposed limiting solitary confinement to 15 days.

=== 2011 Congressional campaign ===
Weprin was selected by local Democratic Party leaders to run for the New York's 9th congressional district special election to the House of Representatives held in September 2011, to replace Democrat Anthony Weiner, who had resigned in June 2011 following a sexting scandal. The district, in which registered Democrats outnumbered Republicans by three-to-one, was under consideration for elimination in 2012 redistricting, and Weprin, who lived a few blocks outside of the district, was chosen largely because he promised not to challenge another incumbent in 2012, should his seat be eliminated.

The seat was initially considered safe for Democrats, as no Republican had won it in 88 years. But Weprin was criticized for telling the New York Daily News editorial board in an interview that the US national debt was $4 trillion (rather than $14 trillion), for unexpectedly bowing out of a scheduled debate at the last minute blaming the already-passed Hurricane Irene, and for his image as a product of the Queens Democratic machine. Weprin was defeated by Republican opponent Bob Turner, a retired television executive, as Turner received 52% of the vote against Weprin's 47%, after a Weprin campaign plagued by gaffes.

Turner, a Roman Catholic, was appealing to Jewish voters, who made up about a third of the voters in the district. He criticized President Obama's policies on Israel, and portrayed Weprin, who was strongly pro-Israel, as being insufficiently critical of Obama's stance on Israel. Former New York City mayor Ed Koch, a Democrat and Jew, supported Turner in order to send a message to President Obama to change what Koch described as his "hostile position on the State of Israel". Turner was also supported by Assemblyman Dov Hikind, a Democrat and Orthodox Jew, and local rabbis, who objected to Weprin's support for same-sex marriage.

=== 2021 NYC Comptroller campaign ===
In November 2020 Weprin announced himself as a candidate in the 2021 New York City Comptroller election. He is running in the Democratic primary against among others NYS Senator Brian Benjamin, Council Speaker Corey Johnson, former US Marine Zach Iscol, NYC Council member Brad Lander, and NYS Senator Kevin Parker.

Weprin started his campaign with a $320,000 deficit. It was a debt he had owed but not paid to New York City's Campaign Finance Board for almost a decade. It related to Weprin's unsuccessful 2009 comptroller campaign, and its improper mingling of public and private funds. On December 15, 2020, he finally paid off the debt, with his state campaign account.

Through January 15, 2021, he was fourth in fundraising among all candidates, behind Lander, Iscol, and Benjamin. He had raised approximately $455,000. Brad Lander won the primary contest in June 2021 and won on Election Day and became city comptroller in January 2022.

== Political views ==
The New York Times described Weprin in 2011 as having "liberal political views". Weprin is a strong supporter of social security, and is in favor of raising taxes on millionaires. Though an Orthodox Jew, he supported legalizing same-sex marriage, for which he was criticized by some other Orthodox Jews. In the debate about the Park51 Islamic community center and mosque near Ground Zero, Weprin defended the right to build an Islamic community center and mosque four city blocks from that site, but expressed his wish that the center and mosque be built at a different location.

== Election results ==
- February 2010 special election, NYS Assembly, 24th AD

David I. Weprin (DEM – IND – WOR)	4,465
Bob Friedrich (REP – CON)	2,757

- November 2010 general election, NYS Assembly, 24th AD

David I. Weprin (DEM – WOR)	17,817
Timothy S. Furey (REP)	5,567
Bob Friedrich (CON)	2,145

- 2011 special election in New York's 9th congressional district to the House of Representatives (472/512 precincts reporting)

Bob Turner (REP – CON)	33,816
David I. Weprin (DEM – IND – WOR)	29,688
Chris Hoeppner (SWP)	278

== Personal life ==
Weprin married his first wife, Roselyn (née Roselyn Weisstuch; also Roselyn Weprin Beekof), in 1984 and filed for divorce from her in 1986. He lives with his second wife, Ronni Gold, whom he married in 1990 in Holliswood, Queens, and has five children.
