= 2021 New York City Comptroller election =

- November 2, 2021
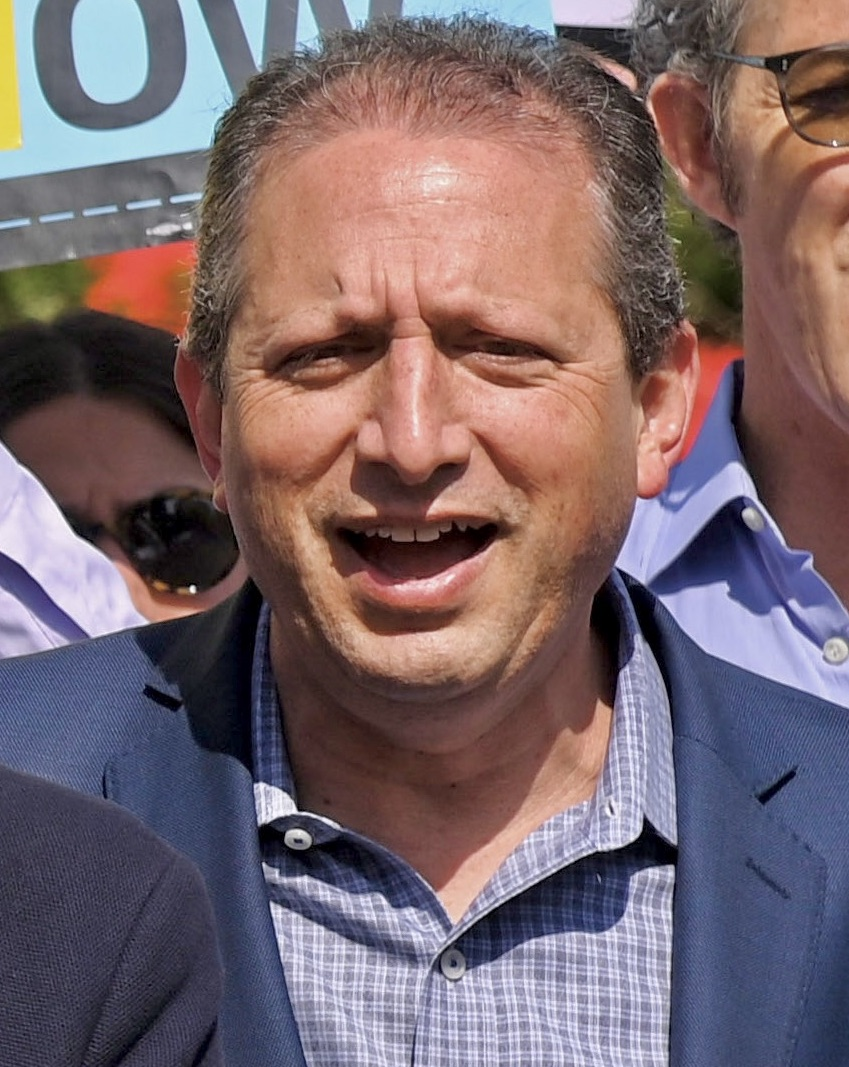

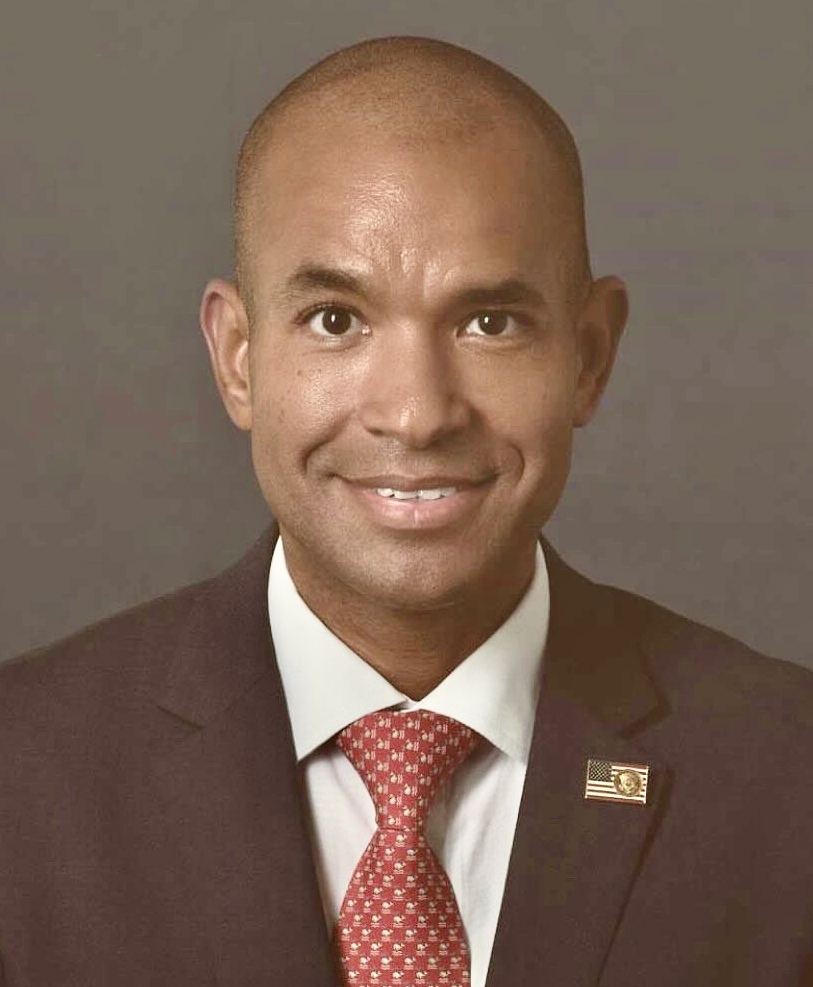

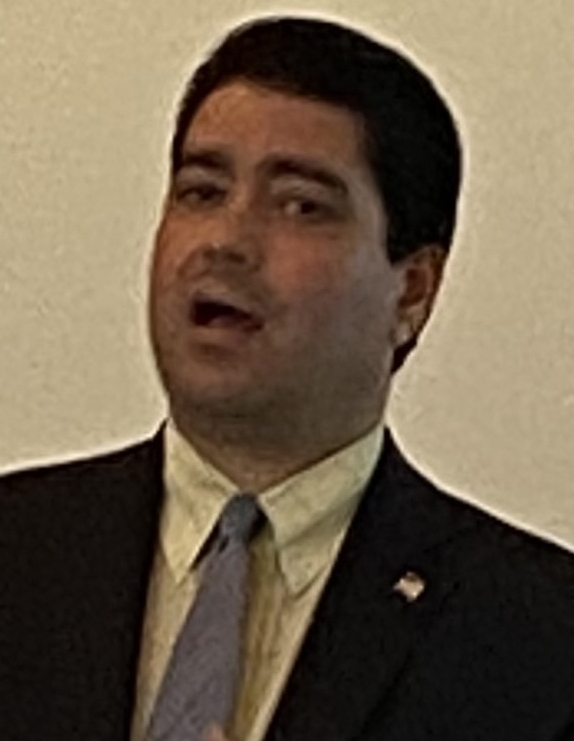
Nominee	Brad Lander	Daby Benjaminé Carreras	Paul Rodríguez
Party	Democratic	Republican	Conservative
Alliance		Save Our City
Popular vote	752,710	249,460	59,251
Percentage	69.6%	23.0%	5.5%
- Lander: 30–40% 40–50% 50–60% 60–70% 70–80% 80–90% >90% Carreras: 40–50% 50–60% 60–70% 70–80% 80–90% >90% Tie: 40–50% 50% No data
Comptroller before election
Scott Stringer
Democratic
Elected Comptroller
Brad Lander
Democratic

The 2021 New York City Comptroller election consisted of Democratic and Republican primaries for New York City Comptroller on June 22, 2021, followed by a general election on November 2, 2021. The primaries were the first NYC Comptroller election primaries to use ranked-choice voting. The primary and general election were held alongside concurrent primaries and elections for mayor, Public Advocate, Borough Presidents, and City Council.

Incumbent New York City Comptroller Scott Stringer was barred from running for a third term by term limits, and ran for mayor. The Democratic candidate, City Council Member Brad Lander won the general election over the Republican candidate Daby Benjaminé Carreras. Lander took office as the 45th NYC Comptroller on January 1, 2022.

== Democratic primary ==
2021 New York City Democratic comptroller primary
- June 22, 2021
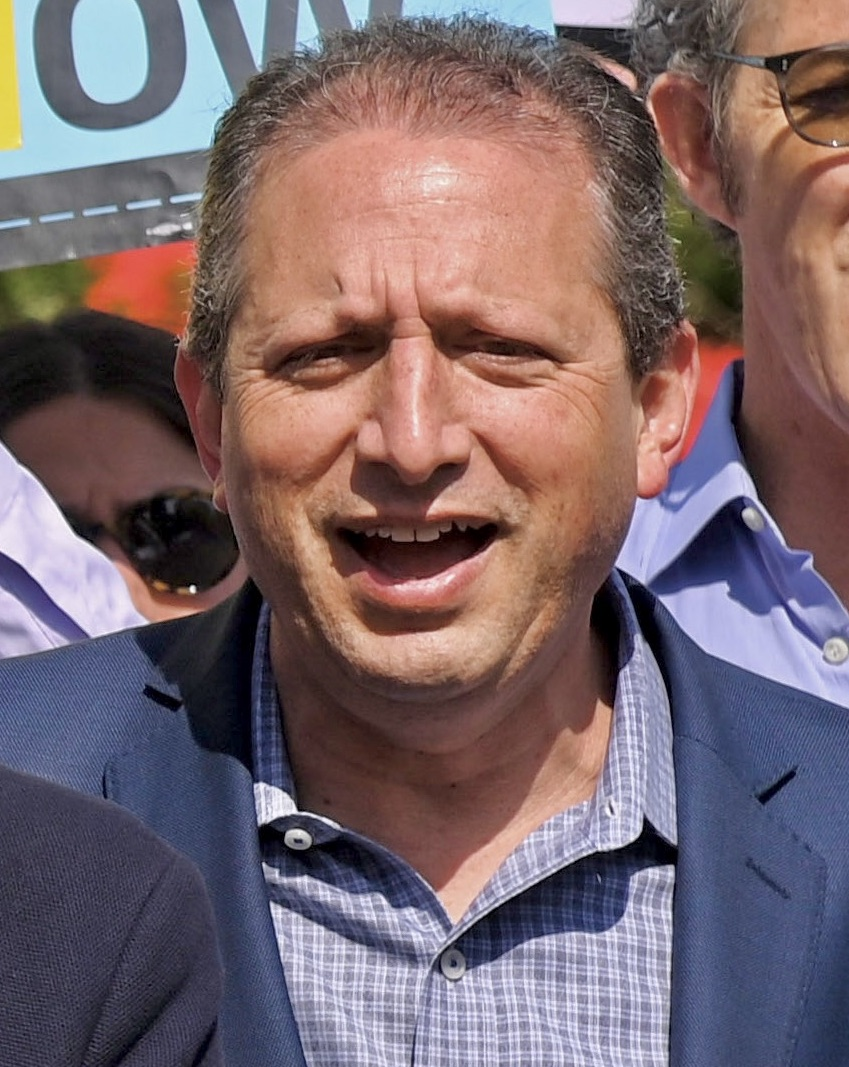

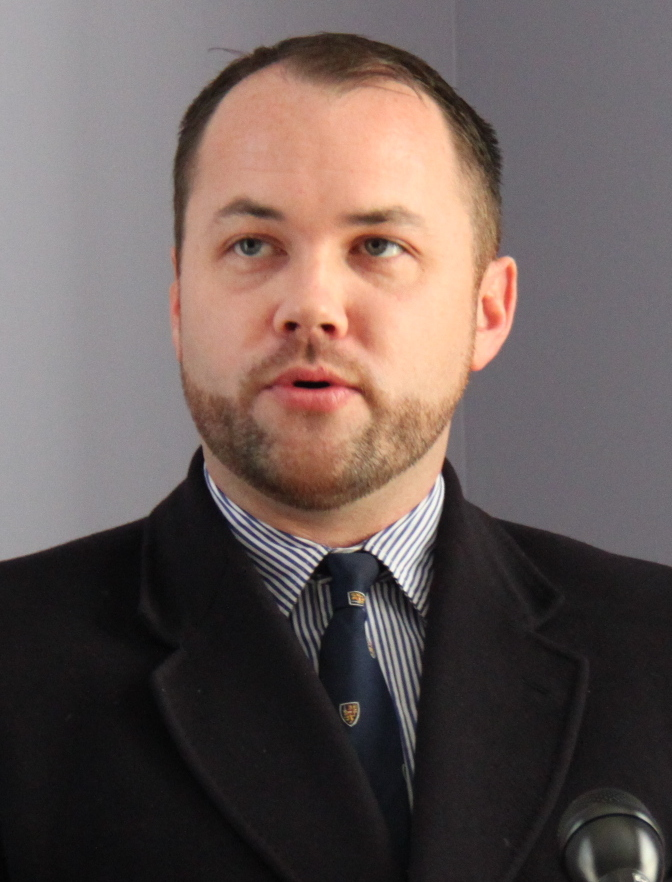

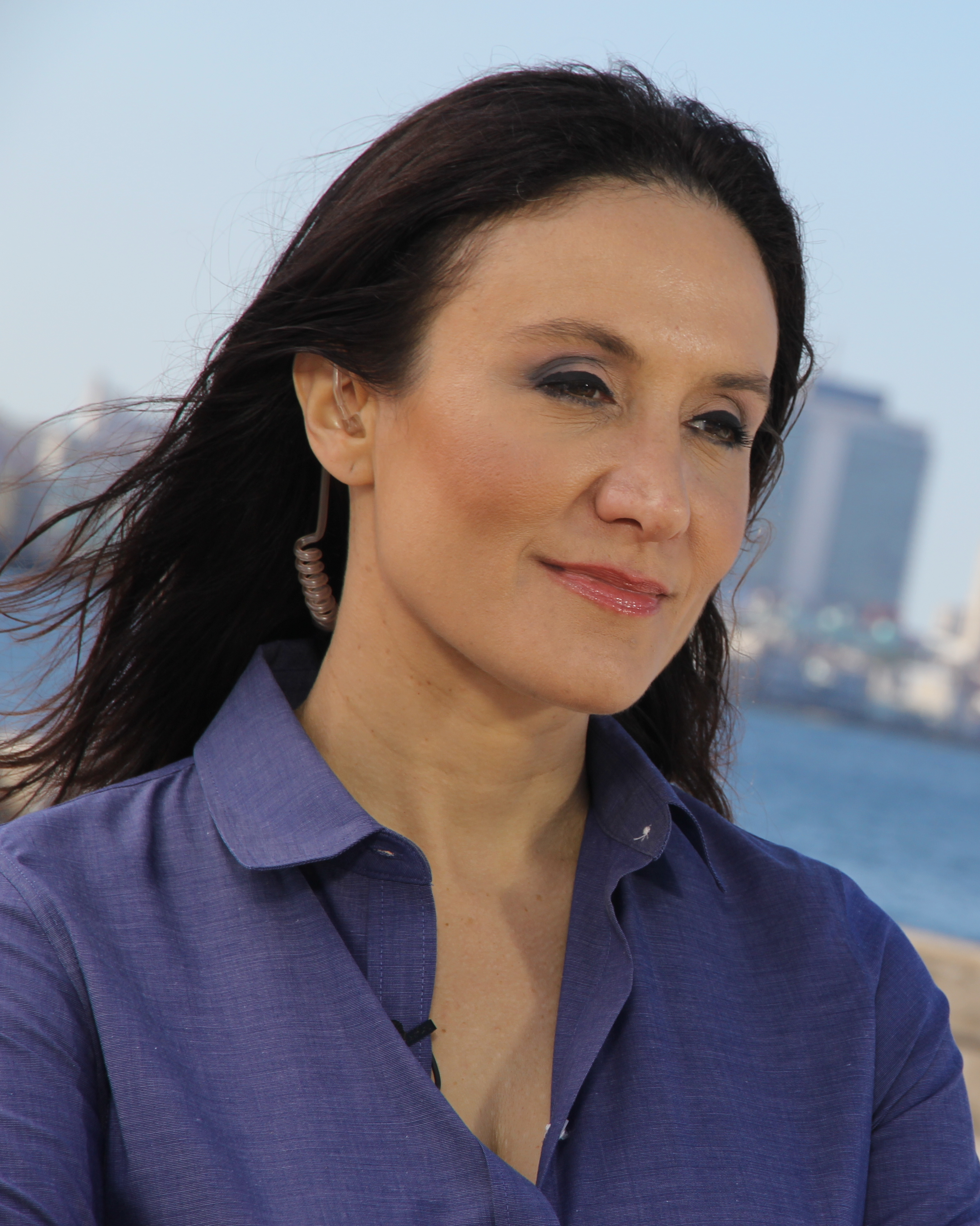

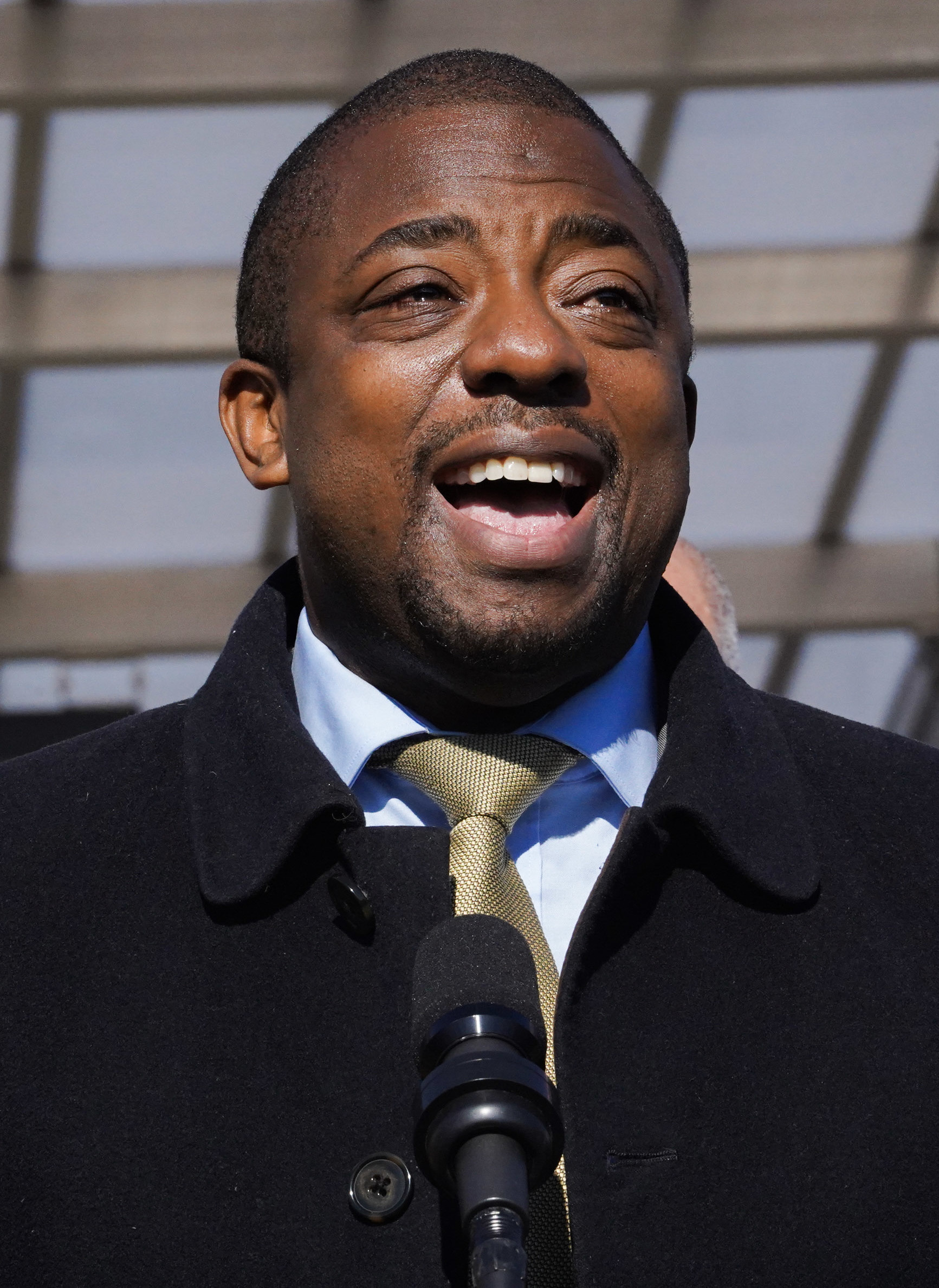

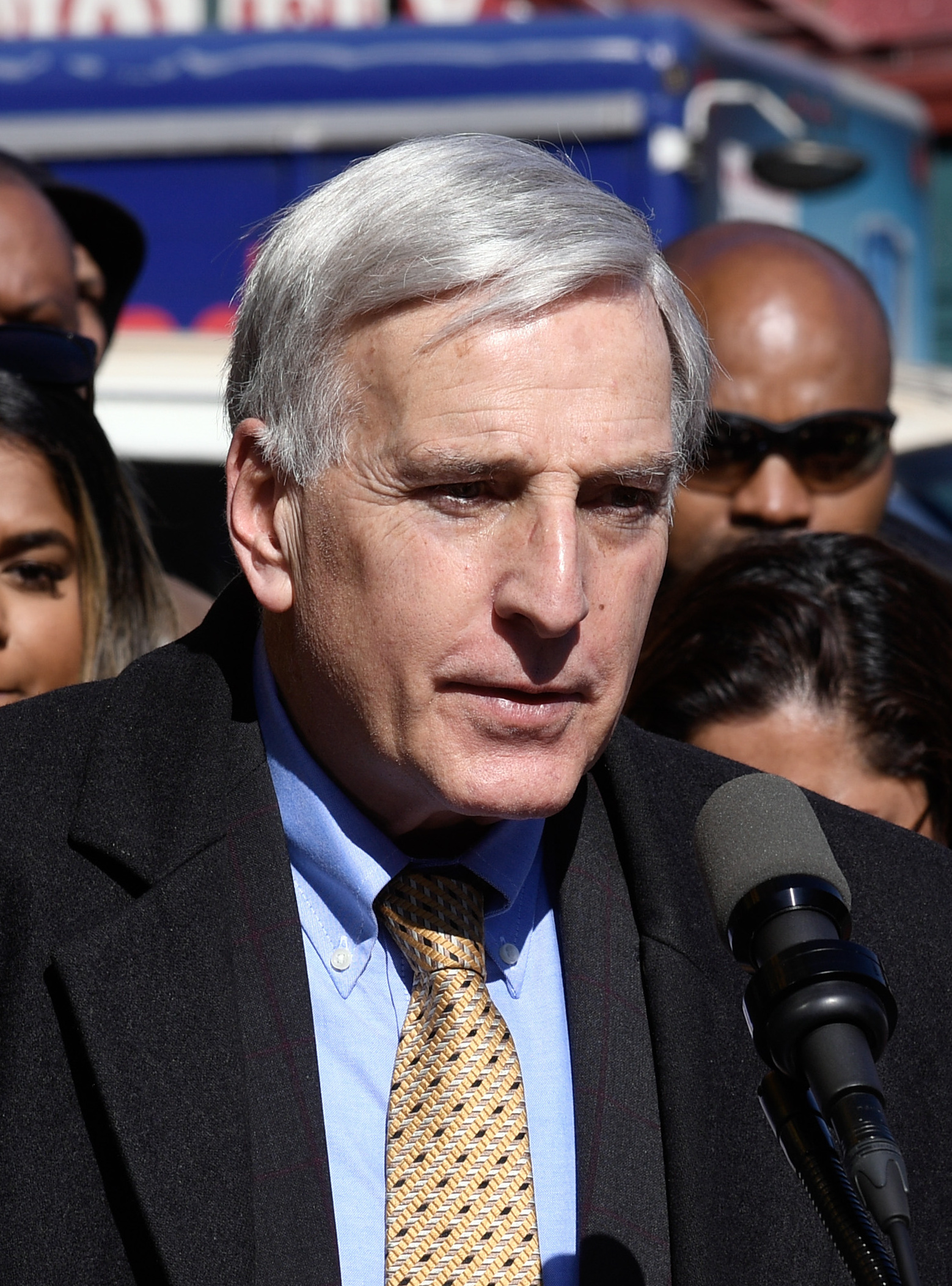
Candidate	Brad Lander	Corey Johnson	Michelle Caruso-Cabrera
First round	268,064 (30.9%)	195,025 (22.5%)	117,134 (13.5%)
Final round	340,944 (51.9%)	315,649 (48.1%)	Eliminated
Candidate	Brian Benjamin	David Weprin
First round	66,276 (7.6%)	62,641 (7.2%)
Final round	Eliminated	Eliminated
- Lander 50–60% 60–70% 70–80% 80–90% 90–100% Johnson 50–60% 60–70% 70–80% 80–90% 90–100% Tie 50% Other No votes
Previous Democratic nominee
Scott Stringer
Democratic nominee
Brad Lander

=== Background ===
The first candidate to enter the race was New York City Council Member Helen Rosenthal, who filed to run for the position on June 16, 2018, three years before the election was due to take place. Rosenthal stated that the early campaign filing was to allow for people who wanted to support her run to donate, and that she would only begin campaigning "in a few years". Brad Lander, another City Council Member, announced his campaign in January 2019. Lander was considered to be a staunchly left-wing Democrat. Rosenthal withdrew from the race on July 10, 2020, citing poor fundraising numbers.

By October 2020 four people had emerged as likely major candidates; State senators Brian Benjamin and Kevin Parker, Lander, and state assemblyman David Weprin. Of the four, Benjamin and Lander had achieved larger fundraising hauls and more support from elected officials. Benjamin officially launched his campaign on October 16, emphasizing his experience in the State Senate and work on police reform, and also drawing attention to his experience in the finance industry. Benjamin's base of support was primarily concentrated in Upper Manhattan, and he posted strong fundraising numbers following his announcement. By this stage of the campaign Lander was considered the frontrunner by the Gotham Gazette, as his base of support among left-wing Democrats was not limited to a single borough. Parker announced his campaign on November 12, emphasizing his work on police reform in the State Senate. Parker was noted by the Gazette as having posted weak fundraising numbers in comparison to the other candidates, and he had a history of personal controversies that were considered potential hindrances to his campaign. Weprin announced his campaign on December 6, emphasizing his experience with New York City's finances as a result of his previous experience on the City Council. Weprin's base of support was localised mostly in Queens, and he campaigned as a moderate.

During January 2021, two additional candidates entered the race; Michelle Caruso-Cabrera, a former journalist who had unsuccessfully attempted to run for congress in 2020, and Zach Iscol, a non-profit executive who had previously been running for Mayor of New York. Both Caruso-Cabrera and Iscol portrayed themselves as moderates, with Caruso-Cabrera emphasising her experience reporting on finance as a journalist, while Iscol was noted as a close associate of the Clinton family. Upon his entry into the race, Iscol was criticised by Benjamin, who described him as a "privileged and failed mayoral candidate". In February 2021, Speaker of the New York City Council Corey Johnson, who had waged an abortive campaign for mayor the previous year, began to privately signal that he was interested in running for Comptroller. Johnson was held to be a formidable candidate, as the high public profile of his position as Council speaker meant that he had far higher name recognition than the other candidates, and he had also amassed a considerable financial war chest due to his brief mayoral campaign. However, Johnson had also undergone a politically damaging fight the previous year over the budget of the New York Police Department, where his attempts to bridge the gap between factions who wanted to maintain the department's budget and those who wanted to reduce it considerably had left him unpopular with both.

On March 9, 2021, Johnson entered the race, promising to run a positive campaign in his launch announcement. Johnson's entry into the race dealt a considerable blow to Lander, as both men were felt to be on the left of the Democratic Party, but Johnson had far higher name recognition and more support from labor unions. Johnson's entry into the race also caused several elected officials who had previously been expected to endorse Lander, such as popular Bronx Congressman Ritchie Torres, to instead throw their support behind Johnson. Lander's campaign would however receive a boost at the end of March, when he was endorsed by well-known Congresswoman Alexandria Ocasio-Cortez, who was popular among progressives and whose endorsement was viewed as helping Lander appeal to more left-wing voters.

Candidates who raised at least $125,000 from at least 500 donors qualified for matching city funds from the New York City Campaign Finance Board, on an 8-to-1 match basis. As of February 16, 2021, three candidates had qualified for matching funds: Benjamin, Iscol, and Lander. Prior to the primary, Corey Johnson was considered the frontrunner, with Lander and Caruso-Cabrera vying for second place.

=== Candidates ===
==== Major declared candidates ====
The following candidates (listed alphabetically) held office, were included in polls, or were the subject of significant media coverage.

Candidate	Experience	Announced	Ref
Brian Benjamin	NY State Senator	October 15, 2020 (Website)	
Michelle Caruso-Cabrera	Former CNBC reporter Candidate for NY-14 in 2020	January 28, 2021 (Website)	
Zach Iscol	Entrepreneur; U.S. Marines veteran	January 26, 2021 (Website)	
Corey Johnson	Speaker of the NYC Council	March 9, 2021 (Website)	
Brad Lander	NYC Councilmember	January 25, 2019 (Website)	
Kevin Parker	NY State Senator	November 11, 2020 (Website)	
Reshma Patel	Member of Manhattan Community Board 6	February 17, 2021 (Website)	
David Weprin	State Assemblymember	November 6, 2020 (Website)	

==== Other declared candidates ====
- Terri Liftin, investment officer
- Alex K. S. Pan, college student at Denison University and former groundskeeper

==== Withdrawn ====
- Helen Rosenthal, NYC Councilmember

=== Debates ===
2021 New York City Comptroller democratic primary debates
No.	Date & Time	Host	Moderator	Link	Participants							
Key: P Participant A Absent N Non-invitee W Withdrawn												
Key: P Participant A Absent N Non-invitee W Withdrawn					Brian Benjamin	Michelle Caruso-Cabrera	Zach Iscol	Corey Johnson	Brad Lander	Kevin Parker	Reshma Patel	David Weprin
1	June 10, 2021	NY1	Brigid Bergin; Errol Louis; Rachel Holliday Smith	Video	P	P	P	P	P	P	P	P
2	June 19, 2021	WNBC	Sally Goldenberg; Melissa Russo; Allan Villafanna	Video	P	P	P	P	P	P	P	P

=== Endorsements ===
Brian Benjamin

Federal officials

- Adriano Espaillat, U.S. Representative for New York's 13th congressional district
- Charles Rangel, former U.S. Representative for New York's 13th congressional district

State officials

- Jamaal Bailey, NY State Senator
- Michael Blake, former NY Assemblymember
- Kenny Burgos, NY Assemblymember
- Catalina Cruz, NY Assemblymember
- Inez Dickens, NY Assemblymember
- Chantel Jackson, NY Assemblymember
- Robert Jackson, NY State Senator
- Latoya Joyner, NY Assemblymember
- John Liu, NY State Senator
- Carl McCall, former NY State Comptroller
- Daniel J. O'Donnell, NY State Assemblymember
- David Paterson, former Governor of New York (first choice)
- Roxanne Persaud, NY State Senator
- Frank Seddio, former NY State Assemblymember
- Al Taylor, NY Assemblymember
- Jaime Williams, NY Assemblymember
- Keith L.T. Wright, former NY Assemblymember (first choice)

Local officials

- Diana Ayala, NYC Councilmember
- Bill Perkins, NYC Councilmember
- Rafael Salamanca, NYC Councilmember

Individuals

- Calvin O. Butts, senior pastor of the Abyssinian Baptist Church
- Hazel Dukes, former president of the NAACP

Labor unions

- Communications Workers of America Local 1180

Organizations

- Citizens Union (first choice)
- Stonewall Democratic Club of New York City (third choice)

Newspapers and publications

- New York Amsterdam News
Michelle Caruso-Cabrera

Newspapers and publications

- The New York Post (third choice)
Zach Iscol

Executive officials

- Hillary Clinton, 67th United States Secretary of State (2009–2013), U.S. Senator from New York (2001–2009), First Lady of the United States (1993–2001), 2016 Democratic nominee for President of the United States

Newspapers and publications

- The New York Post (first choice)

Organizations

- New Politics
Corey Johnson

Federal officials

- Carolyn Maloney, U.S. Representative for New York's 12th congressional district
- Gregory Meeks, U.S. Representative for New York's 5th congressional district (second choice)
- Grace Meng, U.S. Representative for New York's 6th congressional district (second choice)
- Ritchie Torres, U.S. Representative for New York's 15th congressional district

State officials

- David Paterson, former Governor of New York (second choice)
- Keith L.T. Wright, former NY Assemblymember (second choice)

Local officials

- Rubén Díaz Jr., Bronx Borough President
- Vanessa Gibson, NYC Councilmember
- Peter Koo, NYC Councilmember (second choice)
- Karen Koslowitz, NYC Councilmember (second choice)
- Stephen Levin, NYC Councilmember
- Donovan Richards, Queens Borough President (second choice)
- Debi Rose, NYC Councilmember
- Helen Rosenthal, NYC Councilmember
- Mark Treyger, NYC Councilmember

Labor unions

- 1199SEIU United Healthcare Workers East
- DC 37
- New York City Central Labor Council
- Retail, Wholesale and Department Store Union
- SEIU 32BJ
- Uniformed Firefighters Association
- United Federation of Teachers

Organizations

- Citizens Union (second choice)
- Jim Owles Liberal Democratic Club
- LGBTQ Victory Fund
- New York League of Conservation Voters
- Stonewall Democratic Club of New York City (second choice)
Brad Lander

Federal officials

- Jamaal Bowman, U.S. Representative for New York's 16th congressional district
- Jerry Nadler, U.S. Representative for New York's 10th congressional district
- Alexandria Ocasio-Cortez, U.S. Representative for New York's 14th congressional district
- Katie Porter, U.S. Representative for California's 45th congressional district
- Bernie Sanders, U.S. Senator for Vermont (Independent)
- Nydia Velázquez, U.S. Representative for New York's 7th congressional district
- Elizabeth Warren, U.S. Senator for Massachusetts

State officials

- Alessandra Biaggi, NY State Senator for the 34th district
- Andrew Gounardes, NY State Senator for the 22nd district
- Julia Salazar, NY State Senator for the 18th district

Local officials

- Jimmy Van Bramer, NYC Councilmember from the 26th district
- Justin Brannan, NYC Councilmember from the 43rd district
- ~~Margaret Chin, NYC Councilmember from the 1st district~~ (endorsement rescinded)
- Ruth Messinger, former Manhattan Borough President
- Antonio Reynoso, NYC Councilmember from the 34th district
- ~~Debi Rose, NYC Councilmember from the 48th district~~ (endorsement rescinded)
- Jumaane Williams, New York City Public Advocate (2019–present), NYC Councilmember (2010–2019)

Individuals

- Ana Maria Archila, co-executive director of the Center for Popular Democracy
- Tiffany Cabán, public defender, candidate for NYC Council, former candidate for Queens District Attorney
- Cynthia Nixon, actress, former candidate for NY Governor
- Shira Scheindlin, former federal judge
- Katrina vanden Heuvel, publisher of The Nation

Labor unions

- Communications Workers of America District 1
- Freelancers Union
- Professional Staff Congress, CUNY
- Teamsters Local 202
- United Auto Workers Region 9A

Organizations

- Citizens Union (third choice)
- Make the Road Action
- New York Communities for Change
- Our Revolution
- Progressive Change Campaign Committee
- Stonewall Democratic Club of New York City (first choice)
- Sunrise Movement NYC
- Working Families Party

Newspapers and publications

- The New York Times
Kevin Parker

Federal officials

- Yvette Clarke, U.S. Representative for New York's 9th congressional district

Local officials

- Una S. T. Clarke, former NYC Councilmember
Reshma Patel

Newspapers and publications

- The New York Post (fourth choice)
David Weprin

Federal officials

- Gregory Meeks, U.S. Representative for New York's 5th congressional district (first choice)
- Grace Meng, U.S. Representative for New York's 6th congressional district (first choice)
- Tom Suozzi, U.S. Representative for New York's 3rd congressional district

State officials

- Jeffrion Aubry, NY Assemblymember
- Maritza Davila, NY Assemblymember
- Michael DenDekker, former NY Assemblymember
- Vivian E. Cook, NY Assemblymember
- Richard Gottfried, NY Assemblymember
- Oliver Koppell, former New York Attorney General
- Catherine Nolan, NY Assemblymember
- Jenifer Rajkumar, NY Assemblymember
- Rebecca Seawright, NY Assemblymember

Local officials

- Barry Grodenchik, NYC Councilmember
- Peter Koo, NYC Councilmember (first choice)
- Karen Koslowitz, NYC Councilmember (first choice)
- Donovan Richards, Queens Borough President (first choice)

Organizations

- Police Benevolent Association of the City of New York

Newspapers and publications

- New York Daily News
- The New York Post (second choice)

=== Polling ===
==== Graphical summary (first-past-the-post polls) ====
Among those supporting a candidate (first-past-the-post polls)

==== Ranked-choice polls ====
Poll source	Date(s) administered	Sample size (Note: Key: A – all adults RV – registered voters LV – likely voters V – unclear)	Margin of error	RCV count	Brian Benjamin	Michelle Caruso-Cabrera	Zach Iscol	Corey Johnson	Brad Lander	Kevin Parker	David Weprin	Others	Undecided
Data for Progress (D)	Jun 18–20, 2021	1,354 (LV)	± 3.0%	BA (Note: Before allocation (including undecided respondents))	6%	7%	3%	18%	26%	5%	6%	3% Patel: 3% Liftin: 0%	26%
Data for Progress (D)	Jun 18–20, 2021	1,354 (LV)	± 3.0%	1	6%	10%	4%	26%	33%	8%	9%	3% Patel: 3% Liftin: 0%	–
Data for Progress (D)	Jun 18–20, 2021	1,354 (LV)	± 3.0%	2	6%	10%	4%	27%	33%	8%	9%	3% Patel: 3%	–
Data for Progress (D)	Jun 18–20, 2021	1,354 (LV)	± 3.0%	3	7%	11%	4%	27%	33%	9%	9%	–	–
Data for Progress (D)	Jun 18–20, 2021	1,354 (LV)	± 3.0%	4	7%	12%	–	28%	34%	10%	10%	–	–
Data for Progress (D)	Jun 18–20, 2021	1,354 (LV)	± 3.0%	5	–	12%	–	29%	38%	10%	10%	–	–
Data for Progress (D)	Jun 18–20, 2021	1,354 (LV)	± 3.0%	6	–	14%	–	33%	41%	–	12%	–	–
Data for Progress (D)	Jun 18–20, 2021	1,354 (LV)	± 3.0%	7	–	17%	–	38%	44%	–	–	–	–
Data for Progress (D)	Jun 18–20, 2021	1,354 (LV)	± 3.0%	8	–	–	–	47%	53%	–	–	–	–
Schoen Cooperman Research (D) (Note: This poll was sponsored by Strong Leadership NYC, which supports Eric Adams for mayor)	June 10–13, 2021	1,000 (LV)	± 3.1%	BA	6%	11%	3%	21%	13%	7%	6%	7% Patel: 7%	23%
Schoen Cooperman Research (D)	June 10–13, 2021	1,000 (LV)	± 3.1%	1	8%	15%	4%	29%	18%	9%	8%	9% Patel: 9%	–
Schoen Cooperman Research (D)	June 10–13, 2021	1,000 (LV)	± 3.1%	2	9%	15%	–	29%	19%	10%	8%	10% Patel: 10%	–
Schoen Cooperman Research (D)	June 10–13, 2021	1,000 (LV)	± 3.1%	3	10%	16%	–	32%	20%	12%	–	10% Patel: 10%	–
Schoen Cooperman Research (D)	June 10–13, 2021	1,000 (LV)	± 3.1%	4	11%	19%	–	36%	21%	13%	–	–	–
Schoen Cooperman Research (D)	June 10–13, 2021	1,000 (LV)	± 3.1%	5	–	21%	–	40%	24%	15%	–	–	–
Schoen Cooperman Research (D)	June 10–13, 2021	1,000 (LV)	± 3.1%	6	–	26%	–	46%	28%	–	–	–	–
Schoen Cooperman Research (D)	June 10–13, 2021	1,000 (LV)	± 3.1%	7	–	–	–	61%	39%	–	–	–	–
Change Research (D)	May 6–12, 2021	1,422 (LV)	± 2.6%	BA	4%	6%	1%	15%	7%	3%	4%	9% "Would not vote": 7% Patel: 2% Liftin: 0% Pan: 0%	51%
Change Research (D)	May 6–12, 2021	1,422 (LV)	± 2.6%	2	9%	13%	3%	35%	16%	7%	11%	5% Patel: 4% Pan: 1%	–
Change Research (D)	May 6–12, 2021	1,422 (LV)	± 2.6%	3	9%	14%	3%	36%	16%	7%	11%	4% Patel: 4%	–
Change Research (D)	May 6–12, 2021	1,422 (LV)	± 2.6%	4	9%	14%	–	37%	17%	8%	11%	4% Patel: 4%	–
Change Research (D)	May 6–12, 2021	1,422 (LV)	± 2.6%	5	9%	15%	–	38%	18%	8%	12%	–	–
Change Research (D)	May 6–12, 2021	1,422 (LV)	± 2.6%	6	10%	17%	–	43%	18%	–	12%	–	–
Change Research (D)	May 6–12, 2021	1,422 (LV)	± 2.6%	7	–	18%	–	49%	19%	–	13%	–	–
Change Research (D)	May 6–12, 2021	1,422 (LV)	± 2.6%	8	–	21%	–	57%	22%	–	–	–	–
Change Research (D)	May 6–12, 2021	1,422 (LV)	± 2.6%	9	–	–	–	72%	28%	–	–	–	–
Schoen Cooperman Research (D) (Note: This poll was sponsored by New Yorkers for a Better Future)	May 4–9, 2021	1,003 (LV)	± 3.1%	BA	8%	13%	–	21%	13%	–	7%	1%	35%
Schoen Cooperman Research (D)	May 4–9, 2021	1,003 (LV)	± 3.1%	1	12%	21%	–	34%	21%	–	12%	–	
Schoen Cooperman Research (D)	May 4–9, 2021	1,003 (LV)	± 3.1%	2	15%	24%	–	39%	22%	–	–	–	
Schoen Cooperman Research (D)	May 4–9, 2021	1,003 (LV)	± 3.1%	3	–	28%	–	46%	26%	–	–	–	
Schoen Cooperman Research (D)	May 4–9, 2021	1,003 (LV)	± 3.1%	4	–	36%	–	64%	–	–	–	–	
Benenson Strategy Group (D) (Note: This poll was sponsored by StudentsFirstNY, a pro-charter schools group)	Apr 16–21, 2021	1,558 (LV)	± 2.5%	BA	5%	9%	3%	22%	6%	5%	6%	2%	42%
Benenson Strategy Group (D)	Apr 16–21, 2021	1,558 (LV)	± 2.5%	1	10%	16%	5%	39%	10%	9%	11%	–	
Benenson Strategy Group (D)	Apr 16–21, 2021	1,558 (LV)	± 2.5%	2	11%	17%	–	40%	12%	9%	12%	–	
Benenson Strategy Group (D)	Apr 16–21, 2021	1,558 (LV)	± 2.5%	3	12%	19%	–	43%	13%	–	13%	–	
Benenson Strategy Group (D)	Apr 16–21, 2021	1,558 (LV)	± 2.5%	4	–	23%	–	47%	14%	–	15%	–	
Benenson Strategy Group (D)	Apr 16–21, 2021	1,558 (LV)	± 2.5%	5	–	26%	–	56%	–	–	18%	–	
Data for Progress (D)	Mar 21 – Apr 5, 2021	1,007 (LV)	± 3.0%	BA	2%	7%	1%	20%	8%	5%	4%	4% Patel: 3% Liftin: 1%	48%
Data for Progress (D)	Mar 21 – Apr 5, 2021	1,007 (LV)	± 3.0%	8 (Note: Hypothetical scenario with all candidates eliminated but Benjamin and Johnson)	23%	–	–	77%	–	–	–	–	
Data for Progress (D)	Mar 21 – Apr 5, 2021	1,007 (LV)	± 3.0%	8	–	28%	–	72%	–	–	–	–	
Data for Progress (D)	Mar 21 – Apr 5, 2021	1,007 (LV)	± 3.0%	8 (Note: Hypothetical scenario with all candidates eliminated but Johnson and Lander)	–	–	–	71%	29%	–	–	–	
Data for Progress (D)	Mar 21 – Apr 5, 2021	1,007 (LV)	± 3.0%	8 (Note: Hypothetical scenario with all candidates eliminated but Johnson and Parker)	–	–	–	74%	–	26%	–	–	

==== First-past-the-post polls ====
Poll source	Date(s) administered	Sample size	Margin of error	Brian Benjamin	Michelle Caruso-Cabrera	Zach Iscol	Corey Johnson	Brad Lander	Kevin Parker	David Weprin	Others	Undecided
Data for Progress (D)	Jun 18–20, 2021	1,354 (LV)	± 3.0%	6%	7%	3%	18%	26%	5%	6%	3% Patel: 3% Liftin: 0%	26%
Ipsos	June 10–17, 2021	702 (LV)	± 5.7%	7%	11%	2%	26%	15%	6%	5%	1%	26%
Schoen Cooperman Research (D)	June 10–13, 2021	1,000 (LV)	± 3.1%	6%	11%	3%	21%	13%	7%	6%	7% Patel: 7%	23%
Data for Progress (D)	June 7–13, 2021	998 (LV)	± 3.0%	4%	10%	1%	23%	23%	3%	4%	2% Patel: 2% Liftin: 0%	29%
Ipsos	May 17–31, 2021	906 (LV)	± 4.5%	5%	9%	1%	18%	9%	6%	7%	<1%	44%
Schoen Cooperman Research (D) (Note: This poll was sponsored by Caruso-Cabrera's campaign)	May 24–27, 2021	407 (LV)	± 4.9%	–	16%	–	20%	14%	–	–	–	20%
Change Research (D)	May 6–12, 2021	1,422 (LV)	± 2.6%	4%	6%	1%	15%	7%	3%	4%	9% "Would not vote": 7% Patel: 2% Liftin: 0% Pan: 0%	51%
Schoen Cooperman Research (D)	May 4–9, 2021	1,003 (LV)	± 3.1%	8%	13%	–	21%	13%	–	7%	1%	35%
Honan Strategy Group (D) (Note: This poll was sponsored by Hotel Workers for Stronger Communities, which supports Johnson for comptroller)	Apr 24 – May 2, 2021	1,100 (LV)	± 3.0%	6%	11%	0%	22%	7%	1%	1%	–	52%
GQR Research (D) (Note: This poll was sponsored by Johnson's campaign)	Apr 27–29, 2021	500 (LV)	± 4.4%	3%	15%	1%	40%	9%	4%	5%	1%	21%
Benenson Strategy Group (D)	Apr 16–21, 2021	1,558 (LV)	± 2.5%	5%	9%	3%	22%	6%	5%	6%	2%	42%
Honan Strategy Group (D)	Apr 16–21, 2021	520 (LV)	± 4.3%	8%	9%	0%	19%	10%	4%	2%	1%	47%
Ipsos	Apr 1–15, 2021	1,000 (LV)	± 4.7%	6%	9%	2%	14%	4%	7%	7%	<1%	50%
Data for Progress (D)	Mar 21 – Apr 5, 2021	1,007 (LV)	± 3.0%	2%	7%	1%	20%	8%	5%	4%	4% Patel: 3% Liftin: 1%	48%
Conscious Voter Contact (D) (Note: This poll was sponsored by Weprin's campaign)	Mar 15–17, 2021	600 (LV)	± 4.0%	3%	6%	1%	20%	6%	5%	12%	–	47%
Schoen Cooperman Research (D)	Nov 2020	600 (LV)	± 4.0%	6%	13%	–	–	3%	6%	4%	2%	66%

=== Results ===
2021 New York City Comptroller Democratic primary election
Party	Candidate	Maximum round	Maximum votes	Share in maximum round	Maximum votes First round votes Transfer votes
Democratic	Brad Lander	10	340,944	51.9%	
Democratic	Corey Johnson	10	315,649	48.1%	
Democratic	Michelle Caruso-Cabrera	9	165,543	22.2%	
Democratic	Brian Benjamin	8	90,459	11.6%	
Democratic	David Weprin	7	75,133	8.9%	
Democratic	Kevin Parker	6	55,765	6.9%	
Democratic	Reshma Patel	5	51,608	6.0%	
Democratic	Zach Iscol	4	29,291	3.3%	
Democratic	Alex Pan	3	24,865	2.6%	
Democratic	Terri Liftin	2	9,993	1.1%	
Write-in		1	1,791	0.2%	

==== Maps ====
First round

Second round

Third round

Fourth round

Fifth round

Sixth round

Seventh round

Eighth round

Ninth round

Tenth round

Lander

10–20%
20–30%
30–40%
40–50%
50–60%
60–70%
70–80%
80–90%
90–100%

Johnson

10–20%
20–30%
30–40%
40–50%
50–60%
60–70%
70–80%
80–90%
90–100%

Caruso-Cabrera

10–20%
20–30%
30–40%
40–50%
50–60%
60–70%
70–80%
90–100%

Benjamin

20–30%
30–40%
40–50%
50–60%
80–90%
90–100%

Weprin

10–20%
20–30%
30–40%
40–50%
50–60%
60–70%
70–80%
80–90%
90–100%

Parker

10–20%
20–30%
30–40%
40–50%
50–60%
60–70%
90–100%

Patel

10–20%
20–30%
30–40%
40–50%
50–60%
90–100%

Iscol

30–40%
90–100%

Pan

10–20%
20–30%
30–40%
40–50%
50–60%
60–70%
90–100%

Liftin

20–30%

Tie

<30%
30–40%
40–50%
50%

Other

No votes

== Republican Party ==
=== Candidate ===
==== Declared ====
- Daby Benjaminé Carreras, private wealth manager at Spartan Capital Securities, nonprofit founder, and activist

== Conservative Party ==
=== Candidate ===
==== Declared ====
- Paul Rodriguez, former stock analyst and broker

== Working Families Party ==
=== Candidate ===
==== Declared ====
- ~~Brad Lander~~ (Note: Petitions to be on the Working Families Party line were disqualified by the Board Of Elections.)

== Libertarian Party ==
=== Candidate ===
==== Declared ====
- John Tabacco, TV host

== General election ==
=== Results ===
General election results
Party	Candidate	Votes	%
Democratic	Brad Lander	752,710	69.56%
Republican	Daby Benjaminé Carreras	245,052	22.65%
Save Our City	Daby Benjaminé Carreras	4,408	0.40%
Total	Daby Benjaminé Carreras	249,460	23.05%
Conservative	Paul Rodriguez	59,251	5.48%
Libertarian	John Tabacco (Note: Appeared under the ballot line "Libertarian/Independent".)	18,802	1.74
Write-in		1,935	0.18
Total votes		1,082,158	100%
Democratic hold			

== See also ==
- Government of New York City
- 2021 New York City mayoral election

== Notes ==
Partisan clients
