= Mark Weprin =

American politician

Mark S. Weprin
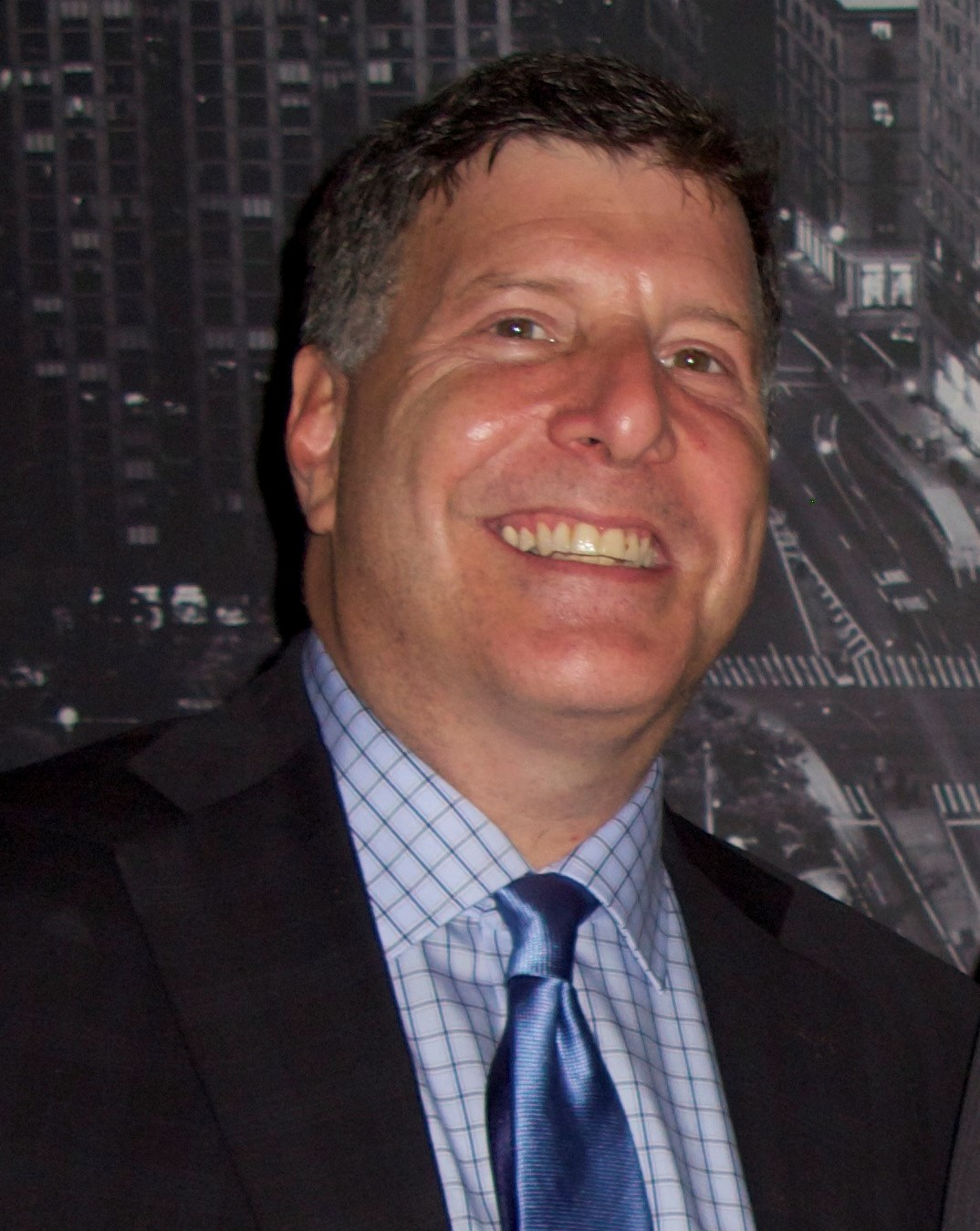

Member of the New York City Council from the 23rd district
- In office January 1, 2010 – June 14, 2015
- Preceded by: David Weprin
- Succeeded by: Barry Grodenchik

Member of the New York State Assembly from the 24th district
- In office March 24, 1994 – December 31, 2009
- Preceded by: Saul Weprin
- Succeeded by: David Weprin

Personal details
- Party: Democratic
- Education: University at Albany (BA); Brooklyn Law School (JD)
- Profession: Lawyer & politician
- Website: NYC Council: District 23

Mark Weprin (born June 5, 1961) represented District 23 in the New York City Council, then the most ethnically diverse district in New York City, which contains the Queens neighborhoods of Hollis Hills, Queens Village, Little Neck, Douglaston, Bayside, Bellerose, Floral Park, Glen Oaks, New Hyde Park, Hollis, Hollis Park Gardens, Holliswood, Fresh Meadows, and Oakland Gardens.

== Career ==
Weprin holds an undergraduate degree in Communications from State University of New York at Albany, as well as a J.D. from Brooklyn Law School. Weprin was an associate at the law firm of Shea & Gould. He has also worked in the administration of former mayor Edward I. Koch and as an account executive in public relations and marketing.

=== New York State Assembly ===
Weprin was chosen to replace his father, former Speaker of the Assembly Saul Weprin, in a special election held in 1994. Weprin was Chairman of the Standing Committee on Small Business, as well as a member of the Aging, Codes, Insurance and Judiciary committees. He also served as Chairman of the Assembly Ethics and Guidance Committee, as well as Co-Chair of the Joint Senate/Assembly Legislative Ethics Commission. Prior to that, he served in the capacity of Secretary to the Majority Conference and Chairman of the Subcommittee for Outreach and Oversight of Senior Citizen Programs.

=== New York City Council ===
On November 3, 2009, Weprin was elected to represent the 23rd district of the New York City Council, which encompasses a large portion of North Eastern Queens, replacing his brother David, who had chosen to run for New York City Comptroller instead of reelection to the City Council (for a controversial third term); David lost the Democratic primary election for Comptroller and later got elected to the New York State Assembly.

In May 2015, Weprin announced that he would resign from his position on the New York City Council to become a Federal and State legislative deal- breaker for the Cuomo Administration. Weprin's new title is Deputy Secretary of Legislative Affairs. Weprin officially left office on June 14, 2015. His seat remained empty until the general election in November. Barry Grodenchik was elected and to serve out the remainder of Weprin's term until 2017.

New York State Assembly
Preceded by Saul Weprin	New York State Assembly, 24th District; 1994–2009	Succeeded by David Weprin
