= New York's 21st State Senate district =

American legislative district

Senator
Kevin Parker; D–Flatbush
- Registration: 78.9% Democratic; 4.1% Republican; 14.2% No party preference
- Demographics: 23% White; 53% Black; 14% Hispanic; 7% Asian
- Population (2017): 338,784
- Registered voters: 218,273

New York's 21st State Senate district is one of 63 districts in the New York State Senate. It has been represented by Democrat Kevin Parker since 2003.

== Geography ==
=== 2020s ===
District 21 covers central and southern Brooklyn. It contains most or all of Bergen Beach, Flatbush, East Flatbush, Flatlands, Georgetown and Mill Basin, as well as portions of Marine Park, Midwood and Kensington.

The district overlaps with New York's 8th and 9th congressional districts, the 41st, 42nd, 44th, 48th, 58th, and 59th districts of the New York State Assembly and the 39th, 40th, 45th and 46th districts of the New York City Council.

=== 2010s ===
District 21 is located in central Brooklyn, incorporating parts of Flatbush, East Flatbush, Midwood, Ditmas Park, Kensington, Windsor Terrace, and Park Slope.

The district overlaps with New York's 7th, 8th, 9th, and 10th congressional districts, and with the 41st, 42nd, 43rd, 44th, 51st, 52nd, 57th, 58th, and 59th districts of the New York State Assembly.

== Recent election results ==
=== 2026 ===
2026 New York State Senate election, District 21
Party	Candidate	Votes	%
Democratic	Kevin Parker (incumbent)		
Republican	Ronald Seifert		
Conservative	Ronald Seifert		
Total	Ronald Seifert		
Write-in			
Total votes			100.0

=== 2024 ===
2024 New York State Senate election, District 21
Party	Candidate	Votes	%
Democratic	Kevin Parker (incumbent)	82,275	98.4
Write-in		1,307	1.6
Total votes		83,582	100.0
Democratic hold			

=== 2022 ===
2022 New York State Senate election, District 21
Primary election
Party	Candidate	Votes	%
Democratic	Kevin Parker (incumbent)	8,543	45.7
Democratic	David Alexis	7,047	37.7
Democratic	Keegan Mays-Williams	3,034	16.2
Write-in		75	0.4
Total votes		18,699	100.0
General election
Democratic	Kevin Parker (incumbent)	47,308	79.8
Working Families	David Alexis	11,581	19.5
Write-in		434	0.7
Total votes		59,323	100.0
Democratic hold			

=== 2020 ===
2020 New York State Senate election, District 21
Party	Candidate	Votes	%
Democratic	Kevin Parker (incumbent)	118,738	99.5
Write-in		606	0.5
Total votes		119,344	100.0
Democratic hold			

=== 2018 ===
2018 New York State Senate election, District 21
Party	Candidate	Votes	%
Democratic	Kevin Parker	85,830	
Working Families	Kevin Parker	8,627	
Total	Kevin Parker (incumbent)	94,457	96.9
Conservative	Brian Kelly	2,893	3.0
Write-in		132	0.1
Total votes		97,482	100.0
Democratic hold			

=== 2016 ===
2016 New York State Senate election, District 21
Party	Candidate	Votes	%
Democratic	Kevin Parker	101,370	
Working Families	Kevin Parker	8,312	
Total	Kevin Parker (incumbent)	109,682	96.2
Conservative	Brian Kelly	4,256	3.7
Write-in		128	0.1
Total votes		114,066	100.0
Democratic hold			

=== 2014 ===
2014 New York State Senate election, District 21
Party	Candidate	Votes	%
Democratic	Kevin Parker	35,548	
Working Families	Kevin Parker	7,419	
Total	Kevin Parker (incumbent)	42,967	95.4
Conservative	Herman Hall	2,022	4.5
Write-in		66	0.1
Total votes		45,055	100.0
Democratic hold			

=== 2012 ===
2012 New York State Senate election, District 21
Party	Candidate	Votes	%
Democratic	Kevin Parker	89,961	
Working Families	Kevin Parker	5,349	
Total	Kevin Parker (incumbent)	95,310	97.2
Conservative	Mindy Meyer	2,733	2.8
Write-in		60	0.0
Total votes		98,103	100.0
Democratic hold			

=== Federal results in District 21 ===
Year	Office	Results
2020	President	Biden 92.3 – 6.7%
2016	President	Clinton 92.7 – 5.3%
2012	President	Obama 94.2 – 4.8%
2012	Senate	Gillibrand 95.2 – 3.7%
