= Linda Lee (politician) =

American politician (born 1979)

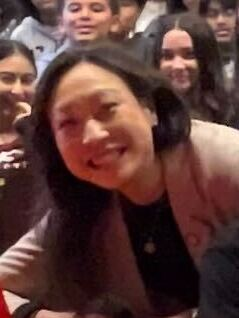
- Lee in 2025

Member of the New York City Council from the 23rd district
- Incumbent
- Assumed office January 1, 2022
- Preceded by: Barry Grodenchik

Personal details
- Born: July 3, 1979 (age 47)
- Party: Democratic
- Education: Barnard College (BA), Columbia University (MSW)
- Website: Official website Campaign website

Linda Lee (born July 3, 1979) is an American nonprofit director and politician serving as a member of the New York City Council from the 23rd district. A Democrat, she previously served as the president and CEO of Korean Community Services of Metropolitan New York and represents the far-eastern neighborhoods of Queens.

== Early life and education ==
Lee grew up in Oakland Gardens, Queens, the daughter of South Korean immigrants. She and her family first lived in the Southern Tier of New York State in the town of Elmira, New York. She received her B.A. from Barnard College and her Master's of Social Work from Columbia.

== New York City Council ==
Before running for New York City Council in 2021, she served as the president and CEO of Korean Community Services of Metropolitan New York, Inc. She campaigned for election on a platform of increasing services for senior citizens, improving the accountability of police to citizens, and workforce training to help recover the economy in the aftermath of the COVID-19 pandemic.

After winning the November 2021 general election, she became the first Asian American woman to represent the district, along with a wave of previously unrepresented minorities on the City Council. She succeeded fellow Democrat Barry Grodenchik; her term is intended to run for two years instead of the usual four because of planned redistricting. Her district office is located in Oakland Gardens, Queens.

In December 2024, Lee voted against the "City of Yes" legislation which would rezone parts of the city to develop more housing.

In March 2026, City and State NY magazine published an interview with Lee after New York City Council Speaker Julie Menin appointed Lee as Chair of the Finance Committee. Lee described herself as a "New York Moderate" similar to the political platform of Speaker Menin. Neither Democrat endorsed Mayor Zohran Mamdani during the 2025 mayoral election.

== Electoral history ==
=== 2021 ===
2021 New York City Council Democratic primary, District 23
Party	Candidate	Maximum round	Maximum votes	Share in maximum round	Maximum votes First round votes Transfer votes
Democratic	Linda Lee	5	7,173	54.5%	
Democratic	Jaslin Kaur	5	5,992	45.5%	
Democratic	Steve Behar	4	2,427	15.9%	
Democratic	Debra Markell	4	2,300	15.1%	
Democratic	Sanjeev Kumar Jindal	3	2,009	12.5%	
Democratic	Koshy O. Thomas	2	788	4.8%	
Democratic	Harpreet S. Toor	2	688	4.2%	
Write-In		1	57	0.3%	

2021 New York City Council election, District 23
Party	Candidate	Votes	%
Democratic	Linda Lee	14,847	64.6
Republican	James F. Reilly	7,112	31.0
Conservative	James F. Reilly	966	4.2
Total	James F. Reilly	8,078	35.2
Write-in		53	0.2
Total votes		22,978	100.0
Democratic hold			

=== 2023 ===
2023 New York City Council Democratic primary, District 23
Party	Candidate	Votes	%
Democratic	Linda Lee (incumbent)	4,113	62.6
Democratic	Steve Behar	1,917	29.2
Democratic	Rubaiya Rahman	490	7.5
Write-in		47	0.7
Total votes		6,567	100.0

2023 New York City Council election, District 23
Party	Candidate	Votes	%
Democratic	Linda Lee (incumbent)	9,399	63.3
Republican	Bernard K. Chow (Note: Shared with "Common Sense" ballot line.)	4,703	31.7
Conservative	Bernard K. Chow (Note: Shared with "Medical Freedom" ballot line.)	520	3.5
Total	Bernard K. Chow	5,223	35.2
Write-in		219	1.5
Total votes		14,841	100.0
Democratic hold			

=== 2025 ===
2025 New York City Council election, District 23
Party	Candidate	Votes	%
Democratic	Linda Lee (incumbent)	32,040	79.8
Conservative	Bernard K. Chow	7,999	19.9
Write-in		119	0.3
Total votes		40,158	100.0
Democratic hold			
