= The Western Front (film) =

- Directed by: Zachary Iscol
- Written by: Zachary Iscol
- Produced by: Radha Agrawal; Zachary Iscol
- Starring: Zachary Iscol; Nick Fox; Abood Al Khafagee; Batrool Al Khafagee; David Kilcullen; John F Kelly; John Nagel
- Cinematography: Radha Agrawal; Bradford Young
- Edited by: Jiunn Kwon
- Music by: Robert Miller
- Production company: Zachary Iscol Productions
- Release date: April 15, 2010 (Tribeca)
- Country: United States
- Language: English

The Western Front is a 2010 American feature-length documentary film directed by debut director Zachary Iscol about his experience as a Marine officer in Iraq and how the US changed its tactics in Iraq over time, produced by Radha Agrawal and Zachary Iscol, and written by Zachary Iscol. The film, the first about the Iraq War made by someone who served in it, debuted at the 2010 TriBeCa Film Festival, and screened around the United States.
