= Kevin Parker (New York politician) =

American politician from New York (born 1967)

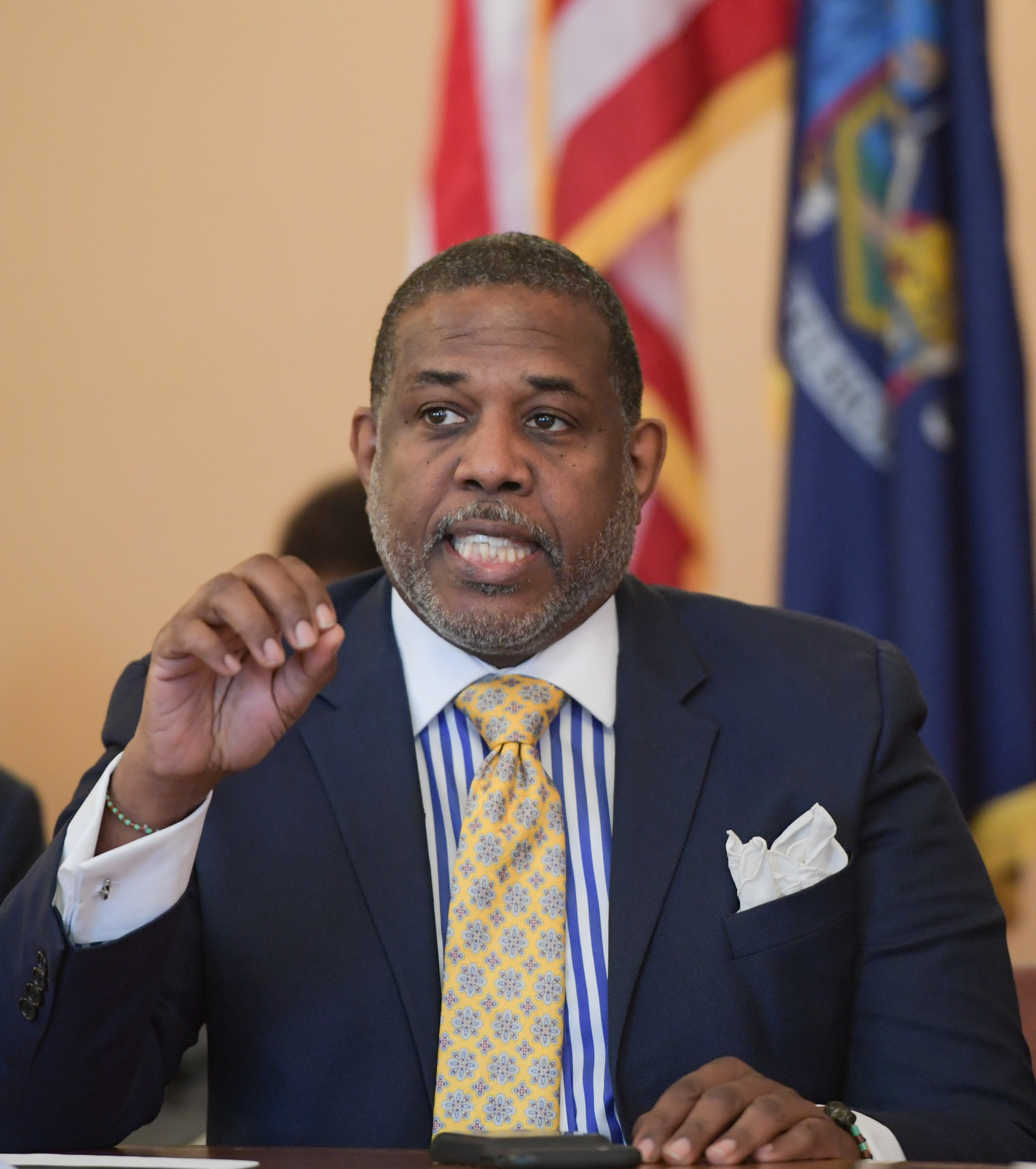

Member of the New York State Senate from the 21st district
- Incumbent
- Assumed office January 1, 2003
- Preceded by: new seat (redistricting)

Personal details
- Born: March 6, 1967 (age 59)
- Party: Democratic
- Education: Pennsylvania State University (BS); New School for Social Research (MS)
- Website: State Senate website

Kevin Parker (born March 6, 1967) is an American politician from the state of New York. He is a member of the New York State Senate representing the 21st district, which comprises the Brooklyn neighborhoods of Flatbush, East Flatbush, Kensington, Ditmas Park, Midwood, Flatlands, Canarsie, Georgetown, Old Mill Basin, Mill Basin, Bergen Beach and Marine Park. A Democrat, Parker was first elected to the Senate in 2002. He ran unsuccessfully in the Democratic primary for New York City Council District 45 in 2001 and in Democratic primaries for New York City Comptroller in 2021 and 2025.

Parker is known for his angry outbursts, some of which have been violent. In 2010, he was convicted by a jury of two counts of criminal mischief for attacking a New York Post photographer, damaging his camera and car door, and breaking his finger.

== Early life, education, and early career ==
Kevin Parker was born on March 6, 1967. He is the son of Sonie and Georgie Parker. He attended P.S. 193, Andries Hudde I.S. 240, and Midwood High School in Brooklyn. Parker received a Bachelor of Science in Public Service from Penn State and a Master of Science Degree from the New School for Social Research in Urban Policy and Management.

Before serving in elected office, Parker worked as a special assistant to New York State Comptroller H. Carl McCall and as a New York City Urban Fellow under Manhattan Borough President and mayoral candidate Ruth Messinger.

In 2001, Parker ran unsuccessfully in the New York City Council District 45 Democratic primary, coming in fifth place with 14.95% of the vote.

== New York State Senate ==
=== Elections ===
In 2002, Parker defeated former City Councilman Noach Dear in a tightly contested Democratic primary for a newly drawn, open State Senate seat in Brooklyn. He went on to win the 2002 general election.

In the 2008 Democratic primary, Parker held off a strong challenge from New York City Councilmembers Simcha Felder and Kendall Stewart. He won the primary with less than 50% of the vote.

In 2022, following redistricting, Parker received a primary challenge from Democratic Socialists of America (DSA) candidate David Alexis. Parker prevailed over Alexis, 45.61%-37.49%, with former Manhattan ADA Kaegan Mays-Williams receiving 16.09% of the vote. Alexis remained in the race on the Working Families Party line, and Parker defeated him by a wide margin in the general election.

=== Tenure ===
In April 2010, Parker launched into a tirade while a white colleague, Republican Senator John DeFrancisco of Syracuse, was questioning a Black nominee for the New York State Power Authority at a confirmation hearing. He objected to DeFrancisco's questions and asserted that he had never seen a white nominee treated in similar fashion. "Amid the nearly two-minute tirade, committee chairman Carl Kruger told Parker he would be removed from the hearing room if he didn't settle down". Parker responded: "Well, you better bring people". During the tirade, Parker accused his colleagues of racism. In a radio interview, he accused DeFrancisco and other Republican "enemies" of being white supremacists; he later apologized for the "white supremacists" accusation. His fellow Democrat, Senator Rubén Díaz Sr., stated that Parker "needs help". The editorial board of The New York Times opined that "Mr. Parker should be censured, and voters in central Brooklyn should start recruiting a qualified replacement."

On June 24, 2011, the State Senate passed the Marriage Equality Act. Parker voted in favor of the legislation, which was signed into law that evening. However, he stormed to the podium where Lieutenant Gov. Robert Duffy was presiding and then left the Senate floor in protest because he was not allowed to speak on the bill. According to Parker, Senate Democrats had previously been informed that each Senator would have two minutes to explain their vote.

After the Democrats won the Senate majority in the 2018 elections, Parker was named Chair of the Committee on Energy and Telecommunications.

In December 2018, a car bearing Parker's Senate parking placard was parked illegally in a New York City bicycle lane, blocking bicycle traffic. When questioned on Twitter by a Republican female staffer about the vehicle, Parker replied, "Kill yourself!" Parker later commented, "I don't know why this is a temper issue. Did I touch her?" He also said: "I’m sure people in my district don’t care." Parker eventually deleted his tweet and issued an apology. Senate Democratic Leader Andrea Stewart-Cousins criticized Parker for his tweet. However, as of January 27, 2019, no formal disciplinary action had been taken against him in regard to the "Kill yourself!" tweet.

The State Senate passed the Reproductive Health Act in January 2019, with Parker voting in favor of the bill; then-Governor Andrew Cuomo signed the bill into law.

In May 2019, the State Senate passed a Parker-sponsored bill that would ban undetectable firearms. In July 2019, Governor Andrew Cuomo signed the bill into law.

A Parker-sponsored bill that barred utility companies from shutting off customers' service during the COVID-19 pandemic and other states of emergency was signed into law on June 17, 2020.

On October 14, 2020, a Parker-sponsored bill recognizing Juneteenth (June 19) as an official state holiday was enacted. Juneteenth commemorates the day when the news of the liberation of enslaved persons reached Texas more than two years after President Abraham Lincoln’s Emancipation Proclamation went into effect.

Also in 2020, Parker sponsored a bill that would have recognized racism as a public health crisis. In 2021, he re-introduced legislation to require members of the NYPD to live in the five boroughs.

As of March 2026, Parker served as the Senate's senior assistant majority leader. His district, Senate District 21, consists of the Brooklyn neighborhoods of Flatbush, East Flatbush, Kensington, Ditmas Park, Midwood, Flatlands, Canarsie, Georgetown, Old Mill Basin, Mill Basin, Bergen Beach and Marine Park.

In March 2026, Parker authored legislation mandating that MTA subway trains have two-person crews.

== Other campaigns ==
=== 2021 New York City comptroller campaign ===
Parker announced his candidacy in the 2021 New York City Comptroller election. He ran in the Democratic primary against (among others) NYS Senator Brian Benjamin, entrepreneur and former US Marine Zach Iscol, NYC Council member Brad Lander, and NYS Assemblymember David Weprin. He finished sixth in the Democratic primary, which was won by Lander.

=== 2025 New York City comptroller campaign ===
Parker ran for New York City Comptroller again in 2025. New York County Democratic Party Chair, former New York State Assemblyman Keith Wright, and New York State Senator Robert Jackson initially endorsed Parker, but later revoked their respective endorsements and endorsed New York City Councilman Justin Brannan as their first choice in the Democratic primary. Parker finished in fourth place out of four candidates in the Democratic primary.

== Altercations and legal troubles ==
Parker is notable for what City & State NY referred to in 2019 as his "long history of making explosive remarks and getting involved in scuffles". In 2010, the editorial board of The New York Times described Parker as "the man with frightening rages that could erupt at any time and on almost any subject".

In 2004, businessman and politician Wellington Sharpe said that Parker had assaulted him in an argument. Sharpe did not file any charges. Parker defeated Sharpe in the 2004 State Senate election.

In January 2005, Parker was arrested and charged with third-degree assault for punching a New York City traffic agent in the face after Parker saw the traffic agent writing his car a traffic citation for double parking. The charges were dropped after he agreed to take anger management classes.

In 2005, a female staffer alleged that Parker had hit and shoved her. She further alleged that after she made these accusations public, Parker had threatened her at a restaurant. Senate Minority Leader David Paterson investigated the allegation but did not take action on it.

In 2008, a female former staffer named Lucretia John filed criminal charges against Parker. She alleged that he pushed her during an argument, choked her, knocked her eyeglasses off her face, and intentionally smashed her glasses by stomping on them. Parker denied the allegations, stated that John had attacked him, and filed criminal charges of his own.

On May 8, 2009, Parker was arrested in Brooklyn for chasing and attacking a New York Post photographer, damaging the photographer's camera and car door, and breaking his finger. He was charged with a felony and released without bail. Parker was then stripped of his leadership positions as Majority Whip and chair of the Energy Committee; in addition, payment of his $22,000 leadership stipend was suspended. Following the arrest, Parker told reporters: "I don't think I have an anger issue." Parker was convicted by a jury of two misdemeanor charges of criminal mischief on December 6, 2010. On March 21, 2011, Parker was sentenced to three years' probation, fined $1,000, and ordered to pay compensation to the New York Post. He was again ordered to attend anger-management classes, and the judge also issued an order of protection.

Parker was restrained by a colleague during a profane tirade in February 2010 in which he cursed at Senator Diane Savino, referred to her as a "bitch", and charged towards her. He then offered to fight Senator Jeff Klein, who intervened. Parker later apologized to Savino.

In November 2023, Parker was sued by a woman who accused him of having raped her in 2004. Parker has denied the allegation.

Disability rights advocate Michael Carey accused Parker of shoving him twice prior to a State Senate committee meeting in 2024. The New York State Police responded to the situation. Carey later stated that he had spoken with Parker and that the conflict had been resolved in an amicable manner. No charges were filed.
