= Barry Grodenchik =

American politician (born 1960)

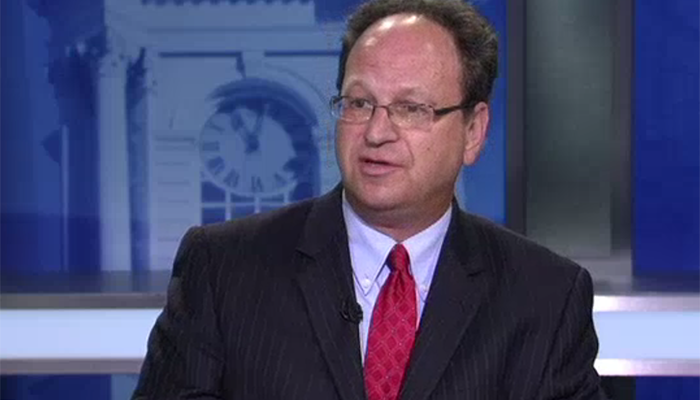

Member of the New York City Council from the 23rd district
- In office November 24, 2015 – December 31, 2021
- Preceded by: Mark Weprin
- Succeeded by: Linda Lee

Member of the New York State Assembly from the 22nd district
- In office January 1, 2003 – December 31, 2004
- Preceded by: Thomas Alfano
- Succeeded by: Jimmy Meng

Personal details
- Born: February 12, 1960 (age 66) The Bronx, New York, U.S.
- Party: Democratic
- Spouse: Debra Grodenchik
- Children: 1
- Relatives: Max Grodenchik (brother)
- Education: Binghamton University
- Website: Official website

Barry Grodenchik (born February 12, 1960) is an American politician who served in the New York City Council for the 23rd district from 2015 to 2021. He is a Democrat. The district includes portions of Bayside, Queens, Bellerose, Douglaston, Floral Park, Fresh Meadows, Glen Oaks, Hollis, Hollis Hills, Holliswood, Jamaica Estates, Little Neck, Oakland Gardens and Queens Village in Queens.

== Personal life and family ==
Grodenchik was born in The Bronx, New York. He grew up in Pomonok Houses, a NYCHA public housing neighborhood in Pomonok, Queens, and attended New York City Public Schools, graduating from Jamaica High School in 1977. He would go on to attain a bachelor's degree in history and economics from Binghamton University. Grodenchik is a lifelong Queens resident.

Grodenchik's brother, Max Grodenchik, is an actor best known for his work as the recurring character Rom in Star Trek: Deep Space Nine.

== State politics ==
In 1987, Grodenchik got his start in public service, working on the staff of Assemblywoman Nettie Mayersohn, who represented portions of north-central Queens. He would work for her until leaving to become the Queens Regional Representative for then-New York Governor Mario Cuomo, where he worked for two years. Grodenchik would leave in 1991 to become the Chief Administrative Officer for Queens Borough President Claire Shulman, and later served as Deputy Borough President for her successor, Helen Marshall.

Following an unsuccessful bid for New York City Council in 2001, where he lost the primary election to James Gennaro, Grodenchik would go on to win election to the New York Assembly in 2002 for a new district centered in Flushing. Grodenchik lost his reelection bid in 2004 to Jimmy Meng.

Grodenchik announced a campaign for Queens Borough President in 2013, but dropped out to endorse Melinda Katz, who eventually won election to the seat. He would go on to work for Katz after she took office.

== New York City Council ==
In 2015, Councilman Mark Weprin resigned from his seat on the city council to take a position in the administration of New York Governor Andrew Cuomo. Grodenchik entered the race for the special election to replace him.

In a six-way Democratic primary election, Grodenchik defeated Bob Friedrich, Rebecca Lynch, Satnam Singh Parhar, Ali Najmi and Celia Dosamantes to take the nomination with 27% of the vote. He defeated Republican Joe Concannon, 55%–38%, to win the seat. Grodenchik was sworn into office on November 24, 2015.

Election history
| Location | Year | Election | Results |
|---|---|---|---|
| NYC Council District 23 | 2017 | Democratic Primary | √ Barry Grodenchik 79.23% Benny Itteera 20.20% |
| NYC Council District 23 | 2017 | General | √ Barry Grodenchik (D) 65.32% Joseph Concannon 32.67% (R); John Lim 1.92% (Independent) |

New York State Assembly
| Preceded by Thomas Alfano | New York State Assembly; 22nd district 2003-2004 | Succeeded by Jimmy Meng |
New York City Council
| Preceded by Mark Weprin | New York City Council; 23rd district 2015–2021 | Succeeded by Linda Lee |
