= New York City's 23rd City Council district =

- Boundaries following the 2020 census

Government
  - Councilmember: Linda Lee (D—Oakland Gardens)

Population (2010)
  - Total: 151,382

Demographics
  - Asian: 37%
  - White: 31%
  - Hispanic: 14%
  - Black: 12%
  - Other: 6%

Registration
  - Democratic: 60.0%
  - Republican: 12.8%
  - No party preference: 24.0%
- Registered voters (2021) 105,007

New York City's 23rd City Council district is one of 51 districts in the New York City Council. It has been represented by Democrat Linda Lee since 2022. She replaced former council member Barry Grodenchik, who chose not to seek re-election in 2021.

== Geography ==
District 23 is based in the pseudo-suburbs of far eastern Queens, covering some or all of Glen Oaks, Bellerose, Fresh Meadows, Oakland Gardens, and Floral Park, and parts of Douglaston–Little Neck, Bayside, Hollis, and Queens Village. Its border with Nassau County is the easternmost point in New York City. Cunningham Park and most of Alley Pond Park are located within the district.

The district overlaps with Queens Community Boards 8, 11, 12, and 13 and with New York's 3rd, 5th, and 6th congressional districts. It also overlaps with the 11th, 14th, and 16th districts of the New York State Senate, and with the 24th, 25th, 26th, 29th, and 33rd districts of the New York State Assembly.

== Recent election results ==
=== 2025 ===
2025 New York City Council election, District 23
Party	Candidate	Votes	%
Democratic	Linda Lee (incumbent)	32,040	79.8
Conservative	Bernard Chow	7,999	19.9
Write-in		119	0.3
Total votes		40,158	100.0
Democratic hold			

=== 2023 (redistricting) ===
Due to redistricting and the 2020 changes to the New York City Charter, councilmembers elected during the 2021 and 2023 City Council elections will serve two-year terms, with full four-year terms resuming after the 2025 New York City Council elections.

2023 New York City Council election, District 23
Primary election
Party	Candidate	Votes	%
Democratic	Linda Lee (incumbent)	4,113	65.6
Democratic	Steve Behar	1,917	29.2
Democratic	Rubaiya Rahman	490	7.5
Write-in		47	0.7
Total votes		6,567	100.0
General election
Democratic	Linda Lee (incumbent)	9,399	63.3
Republican	Bernard Chow	4,703	
Conservative	Bernard Chow	520	
Total	Bernard Chow	5,223	35.2
Write-in		219	1.5
Total votes		14,841	100.0
Democratic hold			

=== 2021 ===
In 2019, voters in New York City approved Ballot Question 1, which implemented ranked-choice voting in all local elections. Under the new system, voters have the option to rank up to five candidates for every local office. Voters whose first-choice candidates fare poorly will have their votes redistributed to other candidates in their ranking until one candidate surpasses the 50 percent threshold. If one candidate surpasses 50 percent in first-choice votes, then ranked-choice tabulations will not occur.

2021 New York City Council election, District 23 Democratic primary
Party	Candidate	Maximum round	Maximum votes	Share in maximum round	Maximum votes First round votes Transfer votes
Democratic	Linda Lee	5	7,173	54.5%	
Democratic	Jaslin Kaur	5	5,992	45.5%	
Democratic	Steve Behar	4	2,427	15.9%	
Democratic	Debra Markell	4	2,300	15.1%	
Democratic	Sanjeev Jindal	3	2,009	12.5%	
Democratic	Koshy Thomas	2	788	4.8%	
Democratic	Harpreet Singh Toor	2	688	4.2%	
Write-in		1	57	0.3%	

An interactive map of District 23

2021 New York City Council election, District 23 Republican primary & general election
Primary election
Party	Candidate	Votes	%
Republican	James Reilly	1,040	66.5
Republican	Alex Amoroso	461	29.5
Write-in		63	4.0
Total votes		1,564	100
General election
Democratic	Linda Lee	14,847	64.6
Republican	James Reilly	7,112	
Conservative	James Reilly	966	
Total	James Reilly	8,078	35.2
Write-in		53	0.2
Total votes		22,978	100
Democratic hold			

=== 2017 ===
2017 New York City Council election, District 23
Primary election
Party	Candidate	Votes	%
Democratic	Barry Grodenchik (incumbent)	4,639	79.2
Democratic	Benny Itteera	1,183	20.2
Write-in		33	0.6
Total votes		5,855	100
General election
Democratic	Barry Grodenchik	14,832	
Working Families	Barry Grodenchik	851	
Total	Barry Grodenchik (incumbent)	15,683	64.8
Republican	Joseph Concannon	6,494	
Conservative	Joseph Concannon	1,349	
Stop De Blasio	Joseph Concannon	208	
Total	Joseph Concannon	8,051	33.2
John Y. Lim	John Lim	462	1.9
Write-in		18	0.1
Total votes		24,214	100
Democratic hold			

=== 2015 special ===
In 2015, Councilman Mark Weprin took a position in the administration of Governor Andrew Cuomo, leaving his seat vacant. Most special elections in New York City are officially nonpartisan, but because the election to fill Weprin's seat coincided with the 2015 municipal elections, a standard partisan primary and general election were held.

2015 New York City Council special election, District 23
Primary election
Party	Candidate	Votes	%
Democratic	Barry Grodenchik	1,942	27.1
Democratic	Bob Friedrich	1,633	22.8
Democratic	Rebecca Lynch	1,466	20.4
Democratic	Satnam Singh Parhar	1,184	16.5
Democratic	Ali Najmi	661	9.2
Democratic	Celia Dosamantes	275	3.8
Write-in		11	0.2
Total votes		7,172	100
General election
Democratic	Barry Grodenchik	6,156	55.0
Republican	Joseph Concannon	3,216	
Conservative	Joseph Concannon	940	
Reform	Joseph Concannon	86	
Total	Joseph Concannon	4,242	37.9
Working Families	Rebecca Lynch	787	7.0
Write-in		9	0.1
Total votes		11,194	100
Democratic hold			

=== 2013 ===
2013 New York City Council election, District 23
Party	Candidate	Votes	%
Democratic	Mark Weprin (incumbent)	16,788	84.0
Reform	Joseph Concannon	3,172	15.9
Write-in		26	0.1
Total votes		19,986	100
Democratic hold			
