= Zach Iscol =

American civil servant

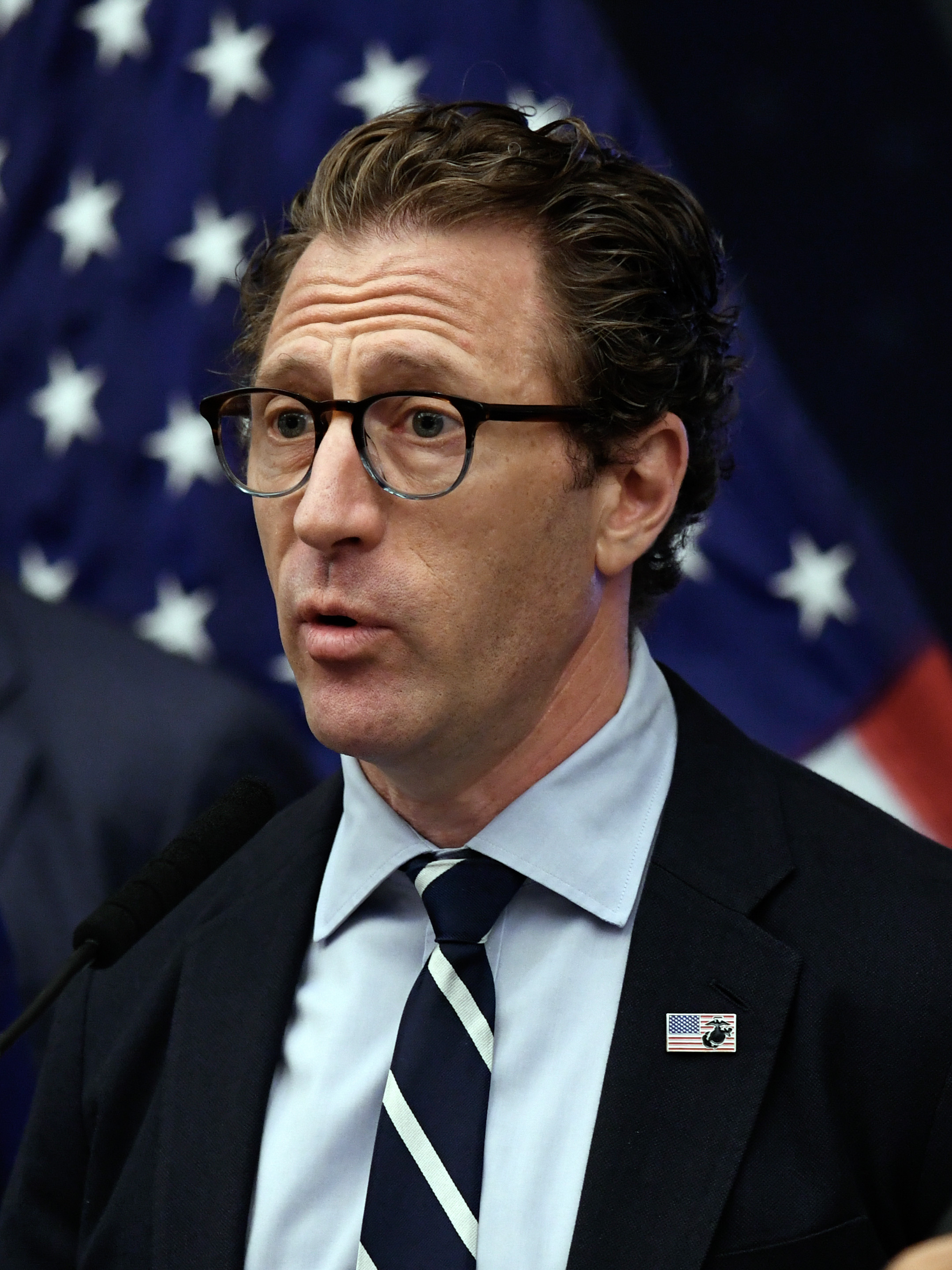
- Iscol in 2024

Commissioner of New York City Emergency Management
- In office February 17, 2022 – February 11, 2026
- Mayor: Eric Adams
- Preceded by: Christina Farrell
- Succeeded by: Christina Farrell

Personal details
- Born: New York, U.S. August 18, 1978 (age 48)
- Party: Democratic
- Spouse: Meredith Melling (m. 2016)
- Education: Cornell University (BA)
- Occupation: politician, armed forces veteran, civil servant
- Awards: Bronze Star Medal

Zachary Iscol (born August 18, 1978) is an American civil servant, non-profit executive, politician, and United States Marine veteran who served as Commissioner of New York City Emergency Management. Iscol is a United States Marine veteran and was a Democratic candidate in the 2021 New York City Comptroller election.

== Early life and education ==
Iscol was born in New York City, New York and grew up in Pound Ridge, New York, in an affluent family. He is Jewish. His father is a cellphone technology entrepreneur, and his mother is an educator.

He graduated from Phillips Exeter Academy in 1997. In 2001, after competing for the school in lightweight football, he graduated from Cornell University with a major in government.

== Career ==
=== Military service ===
Iscol served two tours and served in Iraq from 2001 to 2007 as a Captain in the U.S. Marine Corps, 3rd Battalion, 1st Marines. During his service in Iraq in the Iraq War, he fought on the front lines in the Second Battle of Fallujah, as commander of a combined action platoon composed of 30 U.S. Marines and 250 Iraqi soldiers. He was awarded the Bronze Star Medal for bravery in combat in that battle, with Combat-Distinguished V device, and the Combat Action Ribbon. After returning from Iraq, he successfully lobbied to bring his threatened Iraqi translator to the United States.

He returned to Iraq to make a film, The Western Front, which was shown at the 2010 Tribeca Film Festival, and explored in what ways the US changed its tactics in Iraq over time. Iscol served as screenwriter, cast, director, and producer.

=== Private sector ===
Iscol launched the Headstrong Project in 2012. It is a New York City-based nonprofit organization that provides veterans and their families in 25 cities with free mental health care.

Iscol co-founded Task & Purpose in 2014. It is a military-focused digital media company. Its parent company is Grid North Group. In 2018 managing editor Adam Weinstein resigned after CEO Iscol requested that he change the title of a ProPublica investigation into undue influence over the Department of Veterans Affairs featured on the site, which Weinstein felt was undue influence on the publication's editorial independence.

In 2014 Iscol also founded and became CEO of Hirepurpose, a hiring platform job website for military veterans and relatives.

=== Political career; mayoral and comptroller campaigns ===
Iscol served as a Deputy Director of a temporary field hospital in the Javits Center during the COVID-19 pandemic in New York City in the spring of 2020.

Iscol was one of a number of candidates looking to succeed New York City mayor Bill de Blasio. He launched his campaign in the 2021 New York City Democratic mayoral primary on October 21, 2020, and was initially entered in the June 22, 2021, Democratic primary. Iscol's campaign staff included Joe Trippi, a national political strategist. As of mid-January 2021, he had raised more than $746,000 from donors, spent just over $261,000 on his campaign, and had about $485,000 left.

On January 26, 2021, Iscol filed paperwork to drop out of the mayor's race, and run instead in the 2021 New York City Comptroller election. As of the end of January, he was the second-biggest fundraiser in the race. Iscol said his goal was to help the city recover economically from the pandemic, focusing on the performance of city agencies. He also said he would require companies that contract with New York City to describe their commitment to the five boroughs and that he would push to reinvest some pension fund monies in local job creation. Candidates who raised at least $125,000 from at least 500 donors qualified for matching city funds from the New York City Campaign Finance Board, on an 8-to-1 match basis. As of February 16, 2021, he was one of three candidates who had qualified for matching funds, along with Brian Benjamin and Brad Lander.

=== New York City Emergency Management ===
On February 17, 2022, Iscol was appointed commissioner of New York City Emergency Management by Mayor Eric Adams.

== Personal Life ==
He married Meredith Melling and the couple lives in NoHo, Manhattan.

Government offices
Preceded by Christina Farrell (Acting)	Commissioner of the New York City Emergency Management; 2022-present	Incumbent
