= Manhattan Media =

American media company

- Type: Media, publishing
- Headquarters: Manhattan, New York City, New York
- Products: Magazines, newspapers
- Owner: Isis Ventures Partners
- Website: manhmedia.com

Manhattan Media is an American media company based in New York City that publishes a variety of community and political newspapers and lifestyle magazines. The company is owned by Isis Ventures Partners.

== Overview ==
In 2001, the company acquired Our Town, The West Side Spirit, The Westsider and The Chelsea Clinton News from News Communications Inc. At the time of acquisition, Our Town was the largest community weekly newspaper on Manhattan's East Side. The West Side Spirit covers the Upper West Side. The Westsider is a paid community newspaper that covers the area between 59th and 125th Streets on the West Side. Chelsea Clinton News began operation in 1939 and covers the area bounded by 14th Street to the south and 59th Street to the north, between Fifth Avenue and the Hudson River. It also owns the magazines Avenue, New York Family, and City and State. City & State was formerly City Hall and The Capitol. They merged for the first issue of City & State on December 5, 2011. On June 12, 2012, City & State sponsored a forum for the 2013 mayoral candidates on opportunities for Minority- and Women-Owned Businesses. Mayor Michael Bloomberg delivered the keynote address.

In 2013, Manhattan Media sold its community papers to Straus News. Also in 2013, Manhattan Media sold City & State to company executive Tom Allon. Manhattan Media retained the magazines. Manhattan Media sold Avenue in 2018 and Dan's Papers in 2020.

== New York Press ==
In 2007, it bought New York Press, whose circulation was 105,000. The print edition of New York Press was discontinued on September 1, 2011, with its online edition an aggregate of Manhattan Media's other publications. The print edition of Our Town Downtown was resumed in its place, after originally merging with New York Press. NYPress.com was sold to Straus News in 2013. NYPress.com is currently owned by Straus News.

== 02138 ==
In May 2008, Manhattan Media acquired 02138, an independent magazine that featured graduates of Harvard University. The publication was not affiliated with Harvard. The title was a reference to the ZIP code of Harvard University's main campus in Harvard Square, Cambridge, Massachusetts. On Friday, October 24, 2008, Manhattan Media announced that it was ceasing the publication of 02138.

== CityArts ==
In March 2009 Manhattan Media began publishing CityArts, an arts review staffed by former writers from the recently folded New York Sun. Billed as "New York's Review of Culture", it was initially distributed as a supplement in other Manhattan Media papers before expanding to become a stand-alone, twice-monthly free publication in the fall of 2009. Armond White, formerly of New York Press, assumed editorship of the paper in September 2011, broadening its coverage to include both popular and fine arts and adopting a new slogan, "Bringing Thinking Back".

Due to low ad revenue, CityArts reverted to a supplement in late 2012, and ceased publication in early 2014.

== Properties ==
- New York Family
