= Fornal =

Fornal is a Polish surname. Notable people with the surname include:

- Jan Fornal (born 1995), Polish volleyball player
- Justin Fornal, acting as "Baron Ambrosia", fictional character
- Tomasz Fornal (born 1997), Polish volleyball player
