= Gary Axelbank =

American journalist

- Born: New York City, U.S.
- Education: DeWitt Clinton High School and Lehman College
- Occupations: Journalist, Television presenter, disk jockey
- Years active: 1976–present
- Employer: BronxNet
- Known for: Host of television shows related to The Bronx
- Television: BronxTalk; The Bronx Buzz
- Children: 2
- Website: thisisthebronx.info; bronxnet.org/BronxTalk

Gary Axelbank is a New York City journalist, disk jockey and TV personality based in The Bronx. He has been called the "Edward R. Murrow" and "Charlie Rose" of the Bronx.

Axelbank is the host of BronxTalk and The Bronx Buzz on BronxNet, a public, educational and government access cable TV network available on Cablevision and Verizon FIOS. BronxTalk is a weekly show that features politicians, business leaders, and community stakeholders in a half-hour interview on the issues facing the Bronx. Axelbank hosted over 1,000 episodes through the show's 25-year history. During election cycles, the show is often home to debates between Bronx politicians. In 2018, Axelbank estimated he's hosted 60 political debates.

Axelbank is a lifelong resident of the Bronx, born and raised in the Van Cortlandt Village neighborhood and still living there. He graduated from DeWitt Clinton High School and Lehman College, and worked as a radio DJ alongside Howard Stern. He also worked as the director of community relations for Monroe College. He launched a local news website called thisisthebronx.info in 2017.

He frequently appears on City & State's annual Bronx Power lists of the most influential people in the borough. In 2025, Axelbank received the 2025 People's Choice Award during Bronx Week, which inducted him into the Bronx Walk of Fame that runs along the Grand Concourse; there is a street sign with his name on it to commemorate that honor.
