= BronxNet =

- Type: Public, educational, and government access cable television network
- Country: United States
- Headquarters: Lehman College; Mercy University
- Broadcast area: The Bronx
- Official website: www.bronxnet.org

BronxNet is a public, educational, and government access (PEG) cable television network in The Bronx, New York, airing on multiple Optimum and Verizon FiOS channels. BronxNet is located on the campus of Lehman College, and at a new studio, "BronxNet East", in the Mercy University campus at 1200 Hutchinson Metro Center.

BronxNet produces some original programming, notably Bronx Flavor, a food-oriented comedy series which focuses on ethnic cuisine and restaurants in the borough.

Bronxnet is a not-for-profit organization that was created under a joint agreement between Cablevision of New York City and the City of New York. The channel provides training for local residents of the Bronx, as well as students who attend a school located in the Bronx. The television production training is available four times a year. The station just produced its 900th episode in late October.

The various channels offer different types of programming such as original local issue programs, shows produced by local residents highlighting local arts and artists, foreign language programs produced by local residents and programs produced by local churches.

== Shows ==
Open 2.0 is a show produced, written and hosted by participating Bronx high school students in a magazine style. The show covers issues pertaining to a younger audience.

Bronx Live! is a show in the style of a monthly series that showcases performing artists, musicians, singers and art institutions. It has been on the air since September 1995.

Bronx Currents is a show that broadcasts local meetings pertaining to the community, such as debates, seminars and town meetings. There are also occasional documentaries highlighting individuals from the neighborhood, either from politics, sports or the community.

BronxTalk is a talk show hosted by Gary Axelbank that is focused on local happenings, crime, economic development and education. Axelbank has guests on the show frequently to help explain issues to the Bronx community.

BronxNet Sports is a sports show that brings live coverage, highlights and analysis for local high school and college sports teams.

Bronx Journal is another issue-related talk show, hosted by Miguel Perez, which has a more national and international basis, while still catering to the local community.

Bronx Flavor is an Emmy-nominated show with Justin Bornal, who plays the fictional character Baron Ambrosia, in which Ambrosia takes the audience through the Bronx and highlights a small family-owned restaurant and its food, while keeping a comedic tone and giving history and background on the food of choice.

Art and About is a show with Daniel Hauben where he takes the viewer on a process to show how to create art in the world.

Vet Talk is a show hosted by Gonzalo Duran, a United States Marine Corps veteran and the Chief Executive Officer of Devil Dog USA Incorporated. The program serves as a platform for individuals and organizations involved in veteran support to present information about their resources, services, and initiatives, as well as to share personal and organizational experiences related to veteran affairs.
