= Straus News =

Straus News is a publishing company that publishes several neighborhood newspapers in New York City. The company publishes West Side Spirit and Our Town, which are sister newspapers that were created in the 1980s by News Communications, Inc..

== History ==
In 1986, R. Peter Straus purchased "several weekly newspapers in New York, New Jersey and Pennsylvania", and Straus became chairman of Straus News. In 1986, Straus News acquired The Warwick Advertiser, The Photo News, The Advertiser and The Vernon News. In 1988, Straus News acquired The Sparta Independent. In 1999, Straus News started The Township Journal. In 2001, Straus News started The Chronicle. In 2003, Straus News started The West Milford Messenger. In 2005, Straus News acquired The Pike County Courier. In 2011, Straus News started Dirt Magazine.

By 2013, Straus News had acquired Our Town, The West Side Spirit, Chelsea Clinton News, and Our Town Downtown from Manhattan Media.

== See also ==
- News Communications, Inc.
