= Tom Allon =

American publisher

- Born: Tom F. Allon; May 21, 1962 (age 64); New York City, U.S.
- Education: Stuyvesant High School, Cornell University, A.B. Columbia Journalism School M.S.
- Occupations: Newspaper publisher, media entrepreneur, journalist, public affairs columnist
- Political party: Republican
- Spouse: Rebecca Cohen

Tom F. Allon is an American newspaper/magazine and digital media and events entrepreneur. He is publisher and former co-owner of City & State NY. Previously he was president and co-owner of Manhattan Media.

He was for eighteen months a candidate for mayor in the 2013 election, but subsequently dropped out of the race. He was endorsed by the Liberal Party in New York. Allon is also a columnist and pundit whose opinion articles have appeared in the New York Daily News, New York Post, City & State, and HuffPost. He is a serial media entrepreneur, who helped build one public media company and two private media companies in the three decades between 1990-2020. He has bought and sold many publications and is considered an expert in launching and growing digital and events-driven local media outlets. Allon started his career as an educator, teaching English and Journalism at his alma mater, Stuyvesant High School. He has also taught opinion writing in the journalism department at Hunter College in New York City.

== Early life and education ==
Allon was born in New York City, on May 21, 1962, and raised in a Jewish family on the Upper West Side of Manhattan. Allon attended Stuyvesant High School. He attended Cornell University, where he worked for The Cornell Daily Sun and was its sports editor and a columnist. He graduated with a BA degree in history from Cornell in 1984. He then received an MS degree in Journalism from the Columbia University Graduate School of Journalism in 1985. After graduating from Columbia, Allon taught English at his alma mater, Stuyvesant High School.

== Career ==
From 1986 to 1991, Allon was editor of The West Side Spirit, a community newspaper he later owned. In 1992, he became publisher of West Side Spirit and its sister paper on the East Side, Our Town. In 1993, he was promoted to executive vice president of News Communications, Inc., a public company which owned 23 publications in the NY metropolitan area and Washington, D.C. In 1994, he helped in the creation of a new publication covering Congress and politics in DC, The Hill. In 2001, Allon spearheaded a management buyout of four weekly newspapers in Manhattan and created Manhattan Media, where he was CEO for more than a decade. Along with the West Side Spirit, Manhattan Media also published the community newspapers Our Town, The Westsider, the Chelsea Clinton News, the political newspapers City Hall and The Capitol, and the magazines Avenue and New York Family. In 2013, Allon once again led a management buyout of City & State, NY from Manhattan Media and along with partner Steve Farbman, built that into the must-read in local and state government. City & State publishes a weekly magazine, five daily emails and produces 50 events a year, including "power lists" which rank the powerful in New York State by geography, demography, and industry. In 2020, Allon sold City & State to Government Executive, a media, data and insights company based in Washington, D.C. He stayed on as publisher of City & State, NY and is leading City & State’s expansion to other states, including Pennsylvania in April 2021 and Florida in May 2022. Allon is also a frequent pundit and columnist, whose work has appeared in the NY Daily News, The NY Post, the Huffington Post as well as City & State. In early 2022, Allon co-founded a new non-profit Think Tank, The 5Boro Institute. After raising more than $700,000 from prominent New York City philanthropists, real estate firms and tech companies, Allon hired former NY1 journalist Grace Rauh to be executive director of 5Boro. Allon’s co-founder, long-time esteemed civic leader Dick Ravitch, died in June 2023. 5Boro’s first Special Report on the staffing crisis in City government was widely praised in government and the local media and a number of its recommendations were adopted by the Adams mayoral administration.

== Mayoral candidacy ==
On July 12, 2011, Allon announced that he would run for mayor of the City of New York. He stated that New Yorkers need a leader "like me who thinks like an Israeli: tough and always ready to defend his people." On January 10, 2012, the Liberal Party of New York selected Allon as its mayoral candidate. While Allon "made a strong impression at a series of candidate forums," his candidacy failed to gain traction, and "his polling numbers mired in the low single digits." Allon raised more than $300,000 for his campaign but against more experienced candidates he had difficulty attracting major campaign donors, reporting just $17,335 in contributions in the two months before he dropped out of the race. Allon withdrew from the race on March 17, his campaign more than $4,000 in debt. The Liberal Party subsequently endorsed Catsimatidis. At the same time, Allon acquired the news organization City & State from Manhattan Media. Allon later became a frequent pundit and columnist in local media on important public policy matters. Candidates for public office often sought his counsel and advice and in 2019-2020 he helped organize weekly "mayor classes" for Brooklyn Borough President and mayoral candidates Eric Adams, who later went on to win the election and become Mayor of New York City in 2022.

== Personal life ==
In 1993, Allon married Janet Wickenhaver, then a freelance crime reporter, in a Jewish ceremony in Soho. They divorced in 2015. Allon married Rebecca Cohen in 2020 in a Zoom wedding ceremony at their second home on Long Island, in the midst of the covid pandemic.

== Outside activities and memberships ==
Allon helped create two public high schools, Eleanor Roosevelt High School on the Upper East Side and Frank McCourt High School on the Upper West Side of Manhattan. He also served on the advisory board of the West Side Crime Prevention Program, the board of arts institution Symphony Space, and the board of the Speyer Legacy School. He was the president of the New York Press Association in 2008. He was appointed to the Brooklyn Bridge Park board by then Governor Andrew Cuomo in 2019. He was appointed to the board of the Manhattan Chamber of Commerce in 2021. In March 2022, Mayor Eric Adams and Chancellor David Banks appointed Allon to the public education policy panel (PEP). Allon is a board member of Press Pass NYC, a non-profit dedicated to starting journalism programs in NYC public schools. In 2025, Allon, along with his son Jonah, edited a book that included a collection of essays by “Angela’s Ashes” author Frank McCourt and his brother, Malachy McCourt. Abrams Books will publish the collection, “Sez I To Myself,” in September 2026, the 30th anniversary of the publication of “Angela’s Ashes.”
