= Mo Gridder's =

- Interactive map of Mo Gridder's

Restaurant information
- Location: New York City, New York, United States
- Coordinates: 40.81218°N 73.88346°W
- Website: mogridder.com

Mo Gridder's was a barbecue restaurant and auto repair shop in New York City.

Both the repair shop and BBQ truck were owned by Fred Donnelly. They received coverage by many magazines and television shows due to the quality of the food and the unusual nature of the business. Mo Gridder's was featured on the Hunt's Point episode of Baron Ambrosia's Bronx Flavor and the Food Network's Diners, Drive-Ins, and Dives Season 1, Episode 10. It has since closed.
