= Baron Ambrosia =

Fictional character played by Justin Fornal

- Bronx Flavor character
- First appearance: Underbelly NYC
- Last appearance: The Culinary Adventures of Baron Ambrosia
- Created by: Justin Fornal
- Portrayed by: Justin Fornal

In-universe information
- Alias: Quaffer of Culinary Consciousness
- Title: Bronx Culinary Ambassador
- Occupation: Writer, filmmaker
- Archenemies: Bürgomeister Bürger; The Queen of Westchester; Lankey the Leprechaun; Al Kajowski
- Years: 2008–present (Bronx Flavor); 2006–2007 (Underbelly NYC)

Baron Ambrosia was a character, a "culinary adventure-seeker", acted by Justin Fornal from 2006 to 2013. The character was a self-proclaimed "quaffer of culinary consciousness" and traveled around New York City, mostly in The Bronx, documenting various ethnic cultures and their indigenous cuisines, represented typically by the small food establishments (including restaurants, food trucks, street vendors, and grocery stores) he visits. Baron Ambrosia appeared in Fornal's self-produced video podcast Underbelly NYC, the public-access television cable TV channel BronxNet's Bronx Flavor, and "The Culinary Adventures of Baron Ambrosia" on the Cooking Channel. In 2012, Fornal won a New York Emmy (best on-camera talent: performer/narrator) for his portrayal of Baron Ambrosia. Fornal stopped using the character after the feature length film BARON AMBROSIA IS DEAD to pursue exploration and documentary film-making full time.

== Character development ==
The Baron Ambrosia character first appeared in 2006 in the video podcast Underbelly NYC which was distributed through Liberated Syndication. The show reached a number No. 1 ranking under iTunes culinary podcasts. Fornal produced, in total, eight episodes of Underbelly NYC.

In early 2008, Baron Ambrosia re-emerged in Bronx Flavor on BronxNet, a Public-access television cable TV channel in Bronx, NY.

Both series focus on Baron Ambrosia's adventures in food (mostly ethnic cuisines and restaurants that are not covered by mainstream media). Bronx Flavor focuses strictly on his adventures in the Bronx. In both shows, Baron Ambrosia involves local business owners, diners, and passers-by in comedic sketches. All Underbelly NYC and Bronx Flavor episodes are written, directed, and edited by Fornal.

The show's following stems largely from its balance of education and humor. Each episode typically begins with the Baron describing a particular ethnic community and then focuses on its culinary heritage. The Baron will then hunt it down and get into a comical situation stemming from his obsessive personality and knack for over-indulgence.

In May 2011 Baron Ambrosia began filming a special for the Cooking Channel entitled The Culinary Adventures of Baron Ambrosia. Cooking Channel's official description of the project appears on their website...

Culinary adventure-seeker Baron Ambrosia faces banishment from his hometown of the Bronx after being accused of pie theft by Grandmaster Mele Mel. Challenged by an athletic duel, he takes to the streets of Newark, NJ in search of the famed Jersey Devil fajitas, said to bring super-human strength to anyone that consumes them. Along the way, he's distracted by other food delights Newark has to offer including Trinidadian roti, Italian hot dogs and Portuguese dry soup.

On November 6, 2011 The Culinary Adventures of Baron Ambrosia pilot aired on the Cooking Channel.

On June 1, 2012 Episode 001The Culinary Adventures of Baron Ambrosia premiered on the Cooking Channel entitled "The Just Desserts of P.T. Barnum". After finding a treasure map hidden in a haunted carousel, Baron makes his way through Bridgeport, CT in search of P.T. Barnum's tasty treasure. With circus ghosts close on his heels, Baron explores the world of Peruvian ceviche, enjoys some Haitian oxtail, and catches a ride on a food truck filled with Jamaican jerk chicken.

On November 2, 2013 Ambrosia premiered his first feature-length movie based on the Bronx Flavor series, "Baron Ambrosia is Dead". The movie screened on the lawn at the Andrew Freedman Mansion on the Grand Concourse and was free for the community.

On October 5, 2014, Ambrosia appeared and served as consulting producer on Anthony Bourdain's Parts Unknown episode on the Bronx. Bourdain referred to Ambrosia as, "an evangelist for introducing the manifold splendiferous delights of his mighty borough to the ignorant. He has a show on the TV, and throws parties where he serves creatures that would make Andrew Zimmern turn gray and slump unconscious to the floor. A showman, iconoclast, explorer, and gourmet."

== Appearances ==
On July 27, 2008 Baron Ambrosia appeared in The Bronx's Dominican Day Parade in his purple roadster the P-Rex to publicize the show.

In February 2009, Bronx Flavor received a New York Emmy Awards nomination.

Baron Ambrosia appeared on the May 27, 2009 episode of Cash Cab, after two strikes Ambrosia won $800 on the "Double or Nothing" bonus question.

The New York Times reported on Baron Ambrosia, Underbelly NYC, and Bronx Flavor on July 22, 2009, describing the current show this way: "flashy production numbers aside, at bottom Bronx Flavor is an effort to educate and entertain without pretension."

Baron Ambrosia appeared as a featured speaker at the National Association of Broadcasters Sony Software User's Event on April 12, 2010. Also in 2010, Sony used Baron Ambrosia to promote its Vegas Pro suite of video editing software.

The New York Times reported on May 5, 2010 that "NYC Life will show the third season of Bronx Flavor on Wednesdays at 9 ... [after this, the] Baron will re-emerge with a new show, tentatively titled Spice Hunter NYC, which will allow him to tour all five boroughs in search of exotic flavors and crazier story lines."

On Wednesday May 12, 2010, with BronxNet's consent, Bronx Flavor Season 3 was rebroadcast on NYC Life (a component of NYC Media). NYC Life reaches all five boroughs as well as parts of Connecticut and New Jersey. As part of the campaign, NYC Life put Baron Ambrosia's face (along with other show hosts) on 103 New York City bus shelters. Footage from the show is also included in a preview reel of the network's new programming on small monitors in 13,000 taxicabs.

On May 14, 2010, The New York Times critic Ariel Kaminer reviewed Bronx Flavor saying, "In its own bizarre way, the show's humor is as unpredictable, and as specific to its time and place, as Monty Python was to Oxbridge of the late 1960s (fewer references to Proust, and more to bikini waxing)."

Following the success of his character Baron Ambrosia, his daughter Tatiana was born on August 27th, 2010.

On November 19, 2010 Baron Ambrosia started a Stomp Out Domestic Violence campaign by releasing a Public Service Announcement.

On December 12, 2010 Baron Ambrosia received a proclamation from Bronx Borough President Ruben Diaz Jr. proclaiming him the official culinary ambassador to the Bronx.

On December 30, 2010 BronxNet premiered the first episode of 'Bronx Flavor Season 4' at the Paradise Theater on the Grand Concourse in the Bronx. After the screening Grandmaster Mele Mel performed.

February 17, 2011 Bronx Flavor received its second New York Emmy Nomination.

In March 2011, Baron Ambrosia was funded by Sony Software to travel to Port-au-Prince, Haiti where he filmed the finale for Season 4. While in Haiti Ambrosia visited Le Ciné Institute in Jacmel and taught students how to edit with Vegas Pro Software. The story was documented in a project entitled Giving Voices.

On October 14, 2011 was elected to be a member of The Explorers Club.

On November 6, 2011 Baron Ambrosia received a proclamation from Newark Mayor Cory Booker proclaiming him a culinary ambassador to the city of Newark.

On April 1, 2012, Justin Fornal won the New York Emmy for "On-camera talent: Performer/narrator" for his portrayal of Baron Ambrosia.

On June 2, 2012 Mayor Bill Finch of Bridgeport, Connecticut officially proclaimed June 2 Baron Ambrosia Day.

On June 12, 2012 a 20X80 foot billboard advertising The Culinary Adventures of Baron Ambrosia went up on the neon 'Welcome to the Bronx' sign on the Bruckner Expressway where the RFK Bridge enters the Bronx.

Baron Ambrosia is the President of the Bronx Pipe Smoking Society which holds an annual small game dinner in the Bronx. Dishes served have included raccoon, porcupine, bobcat, coyote, skunk & beaver castor schnapps. All the meat is captured in the wilds of the Adirondack Mountains and is prepared by a team of chefs selected by Ambrosia. The events are invite only and are designed to introduce alternative protein sources as well as celebrate native eating traditions. The first dinner was held at the abandoned Bronx County Courthouse January 29, 2011. The 2nd annual dinner was held at the Latvian Society's Daugavas Vanagi House February 11, 2012 The third annual dinner was held at the Andrew Freedman Home March 3, 2013

On July 27, 2013 Baron Ambrosia became the first person in recorded history to swim the length of the Bronx using the Bronx River. He entered the water at Neried Avenue on the Bronx/Yonkers border and exited at Soundview Lagoon in the East River

On July 19, 2014 Ambrosia launched his first product Płacz Brzozy Birch Sap Wine by hosting an illegal cave party and tasting in a partially submerged grotto.

On October 8, 2014 Ambrosia became the first person to swim the width of Camden, New Jersey using the Cooper River. The swim was done to protest street violence and showcase the positive attributes of Camden. A lawyer representing Camden County threatened to have Ambrosia arrested if he attempted the swim on the planned date of October 11. Baron swam under cover of night to avoid detection by law enforcement.

== Underbelly NYC episodes ==
1. Chimi Chimi Bang Bang Release Date: January 25, 2007
Culinary Focus: Chimichurri trucks of Washington Heights parked on Broadway between 175th and 181st Street.
Location New York City

2. Cuchifritos of Love Release Date: March 11, 2007
Culinary Focus: 188 Cuchifritos Restaurant in the Bronx
Location: Bronx, New York

3. Battle of the Forbidden Fruit Release Date: March 12, 2007
Culinary Focus: In this break away episode Baron puts forth the possibility the Durian was the true forbidden fruit in the garden of Eden.
Location: Vandcourtlandt Park Bronx, New York

4. Secrets of the Liberian Funk Release Date: March 14, 2007
Culinary Focus: The homemade Liberian foods of Eliza Smith (i.e. palm butter, fried pepper sauce, sweet potato greens, torborgee)
Location: Jamaica, New York

5. Ca Cuong City Release Date: April 19, 2007
Culinary Focus: The thoracic exudate of the lethocerus indicus (giant water bug)
Location: Vietnam (various), Bronx, New York

6. Fruit Van Fantasia Release Date April 26, 2007
Culinary Focus: The mamey milk shakes and mavi sold at the fruit van located at exit 5 off the Bronx River Parkway

7. Viva Pulque Release Date: July 22, 2007
Culinary Focus: The sacred fermented juice of the Magey plant known as Pulque.
Location: Mexico (various)

8. A Latke Lunacy Release Date August 12, 2007
Culinary Focus: the potato pancakes sold by Paul Schmuckler from his Briggs Avenue apartment.
Location: Bronx, New York

== Bronx Flavor episodes ==
Season 1
1. The Purple Coffin Air Date: March 11, 2008
An introductory episode in which the Baron arrives in the Bronx after a five-year mission to exotic lands and is asked to be a culinary correspondent for Bronxnet Channel 67

2. Legend of the Bullet Proof Foot Air Date: April 4, 2008
Culinary Focus: The Jamaican curried cow's foot from Jamrock Cooking.
Location: Jamrock Cooking

3. Burek Mania Air Date: April 18, 2008
Culinary Focus: Albanian and Kosovan Burek
Locations: Tony & Tina's Pizza, Dukagjini Burek

4. The Platinum Paan Don Air Date: May 2, 2008
Culinary Focus: The Indian aperitif created from the leaf of the betelnut creeper
Location: Dashi Bazaar

5. The Rites of Sandwich Air Date May 16, 2008
Culinary Focus: A mammoth sandwich named after Baron Ambrosia

6. Fufu Inferno Air Date June 2, 2008
Culinary Focus: West African cuisine in particular soup and fufu
Location: Sankofa Restaurant

7. The Giffiti That Keeps on Giving Air Date: June 13, 2008
Culinary Focus: Garifuna cuisine and the aphrodisiac known as giffiti
Location: Garifuna Star

8. The Ghosts of Endorsements Past Air Date: June 27, 2008
Culinary Focus: Thai curries
Location: Siam Square Restaurant

9. A Cheesecake Odyssey Air Date: July 11, 2008
Culinary Focus: Cheesecake
Location: S & S Cheesecake

Season 2
10. The Agony of Flavor Part 1: Pasteles Pandemonium Air Date: August 25, 2008
Culinary Focus: The Puerto Rican tamale known as a pastel
Location: Pasteles by Noemi
11. The Agony of Flavor Part 2: Purgatory Pate Air Date: September 5, 2008
Culinary Focus: the healing Haitian beef patties of Vodou Mambo Rose Carline
Location: Jamaica, Queens

12. Cuchifritos of Love: Platinum Edition Air Date: September 19, 08
Culinary Focus: A re-release of the Underbelly episode of the same name with new scenes and extended plot.
Location: 188 Cuchifritos

13. The Legend of Van Cortlandt Park Air Date: September 26, 2008
Culinary Focus: The carrot cake and other various bake goods of Lloyd’s Carrot Cake.
Location: Lloyd’s Carrot Cake

14.Night at the Bodega Air Date: October 10, 2008
Culinary Focus: The products that can be found and purchased in various Bronx bodegas
Location: The Vargas Deli
Special Guest: Grandmaster Melle Mel

15. Friend or Phở Air Date: October 24, 2008
Culinary Focus: Vietnamese cuisine, in particular, the soup known as Pho.
Location: World of Taste Seafood and Deli

16. Quantum of Chimi Air Date: November 7, 2008
Culinary Focus: Chimichurri Hamburger
Location: El Rincon De Los Taxistas Chimi Truck

17. The Chitlin' Rapture Air Date: November 21, 2008
Culinary Focus: Soul food
Location:Berzet's Soul Food & Fillet of Soul

Seasonal
18. Bronx Flavor Christmas Spectacular Air Date: December 24, 2008
In this half-hour black & white ode to the Christmas films of the 1950s, Baron Ambrosia
must get together $300,000 before midnight Christmas Eve to save the Bronx Orphanage from a
greedy developer who wishes to convert it into a coffee shop for yuppies.

Season 3
19. The Vodka Sauce Vendetta Air Date: March 1, 2009
Culinary Focus: Italian Food
Location: Ann & Tony's Restaurant

20. The Liberian, The Pepper and the Pestle Air Date: April 5, 2009
Culinary Focus: Palm Butter
Location: Aunty Nana's & the Water Street Market in Monrovia
Award:Best Comedy/Documentary 2009 New York Independent Film Festival

21. The Corned Beef Confidential Air Date: April 24, 2009
Culinary Focus: Irish Foods
Location: An Beal Bocht & Prime Cut Meats

22. A Passover Preposterous Air Date: May 31, 2009
Culinary Focus: Jewish Foods
Location: Liebman's Delicatessen

23. Roti Express Air Date: July 5, 2009/
Culinary Focus: Guyanese & Trini Cuisine
Location: Lai's Roti & Coconut Palm

24. Joe Bataan Stole My Girlfriend Air Date: August 2, 2009
Culinary Focus: Southern Mexican Cuisine
Location: Xochimilco Special Guest: Joe Bataan

25. A Hunts Point Haunting Air Date: October 6, 2009
Culinary Focus: BBQ
Location: Mo Gridder's BBQ

26. End Game I: Saving City Island Air Date January 1, 2010
Culinary Focus: Seafood
Location: Lobster House & The Black Whale
Special Guest: Chef Michael Valentino Proietti

27. End Game II: The Bling of Fire Air Date February 7, 2010
Culinary Focus: Jamaican Cuisine
Location: H.I.M Ital Rasta-rant & Barry's Jerk Delight
Special Guest: Sal Abbatiello

Seasonal
28. Thankschriskwanzaakah Air Date: November 29, 2009
To deal with the slumping economy the government combines all the winter holidays. Awesome Mart CEO and greedy slickster Belvedere Washburton buys the holiday so he is the only one who can sell the official dish...Laturgogoosamel! After the cursed meat turns all Bronxites into zombie shoppers it is up to the Baron to save all the holidays from certain destruction.

Season 4
29. Culinary Nonesense-ness Air Date: January 4, 2011
While Baron Ambrosia is in maximum security prison, a national television network hires a hipster look-alike named Brian Andozza to hijack the show. The network renames the show Bronx Flava and attempts to give it an aloof mean-spirited edge. New host Brian gets more than bargains for when he visits Bate African Restaurant on Melrose Avenue and the Bronx Pop Soda Company in Little Italy.
Culinary Focus: Guinean Cuisine
Location: Bate African Restaurant & Bronx Pop Soda Company

30. Correctional Festivities Air Date: July 25, 2011
While Baron Ambrosia is locked up in a ‘maximum security prison for incredibly stylish super villains’ he documents the unique recipes that have evolved in prison culture. After breaking into the prison kitchen, Ambrosia and fellow inmates show how to create some notorious favorites. The menu includes jailhouse burritos, pruno, as well as a surprise dish that may hold the secret to Baron Ambrosia’s escape.
Culinary Focus: Prison Recipes

31. Baron Ambrosia Is Dead Premiere: November 2, 2013
This feature-length film picks up where the series left off. With the help of an old lover name Gata, Baron ambrosia escapes from prison. With a huge reward on his head he finds he can trust no one. Using a sacred Bangladeshi pepper he attempts to escape death and flee to Port-au-Prince, Haiti.
Culinary Focus: Haitian, Dominican, and Bangladeshi Cuisine.

== The Culinary Adventures of Baron Ambrosia ==
Pilot Episode Air Date: November 11, 2011
Accused of pie theft, Baron Ambrosia faces banishment from the Bronx if he can't defeat Grandmaster Mele Mel in a duel... of pull-ups. He takes to the streets of Newark, NJ in search of Jersey Devil fajitas, said to bring super-human strength to anyone that consumes them. Along the way, he's distracted by Trinidadian roti, Italian hot dogs and Portuguese dry soup

Season 1
1. The Just Desserts of P.T. Barnum Air Date: June 1, 2012
After finding a treasure map hidden in a haunted carousel, Baron makes his way through Bridgeport, CT in search of P.T. Barnum's tasty treasure. With circus ghosts close on his heels, Baron explores the world of Peruvian ceviche, enjoys some Haitian oxtail, and catches a ride on a food truck filled with Jamaican jerk chicken.

2. Scent of a Baron Air Date: June 8, 2012
In order to woo the lovely Tsarina, Maiden of the Sea, Baron Ambrosia seeks out the finest culinary aromas in Brighton Beach, Brooklyn. His stop is Pirosmani, where he captures the seductive scent of Georgian lamb stew. However, he soon discovers his nemesis, Burgermeister Burger, is stealing recipes from top local establishments. To complete his collection of fragrance—which still includes Uzbek noodle soup and Russian meat pie—Baron must find a way to defeat his rival, protect the neighborhood restaurants, and win the heart of the Tsarina.

3. Oh, Little Witch of Bethlehem Air Date: June 15,
Something is amiss in Bethlehem, PA. After a long, foodless journey, Baron and his trusty camel find themselves in a town where the people are fearful and the restaurants are closed. A hungry Baron searches out El Salvadorian pupusas, only to learn that an evil witch, Dona Sofrito, has cursed the town. Any restaurant unwilling to satisfy her endless appetite will get turned into Radical Taco, a soulless fast food joint. Baron gathers strength from a Syrian raw meat dish, and in the end, must face Dona in the ultimate showdown, armed only with his wit, stew burgers, and a very powerful cheese.

4. The Stomach Rumble of Baltimore Air Date: June 22, 2012
Ah, to be young and in love! Baron and his best girl, Shanaye, couldn't be happier... until Shanaye's jealous ex-boyfriend, JW, gets out of jail. Baron is oblivious to the threat, engrossed in Ethiopian specialties and Korean soup – but JW is out for blood. JW finally catches up to the lovebirds as they enjoy BBQ Bill's infamous ribs, and it's time to settle the score. BBQ Bill sets up a game of crab roulette, and Baron and JW go head to head in a deadly crab-filled battle for the love of Shanaye. Special guest star John Waters.

5. Croquet Challenge of Compton Air Date: July 6, 2012
It's a beautiful day on the field of the Compton Croquet Club, when Baron and friends are rudely interrupted by greedy land developer Phil Badaxster, who threatens to turn the entire city into a giant parking lot. Baron and Badaxster enter into the ultimate croquet challenge – with Baron fighting to save the community. Badaxster whacks Baron's ball out of the park... but the game's not over yet. Baron follows his ball all over South LA – tasting some fried turkey soul tacos in Compton and Indonesian delicacies in Bellflower, before finding his inner Samoan warrior in Long Beach.

6. East Bay Investigations Air Date: July 13, 2012
While visiting his friend, Private Investigator John Law in Oakland, CA, Baron gets roped into a film noir detective story like no other. A beautiful woman with a mysterious note leads Baron and John on a chase for her missing husband. Of course, Baron is more interested in his investigation of the Filipino delights and killer soul food and pie than he is in finding the kidnapped hubby. Can the crime-solving duo of Baron and Law do manage to get to the bottom of the mystery? It seems to be more twisted than they thought...

7. Werefox of Phoenix Air Date: July 20, 2012
Baron heads to Phoenix, AZ to ask a Native American Chief for his daughter's hand in marriage. He soon finds that the village is being harassed by a hungry "Werefox." Baron goes off in search of a food delicious enough to convince the "Werefox" to leave the village in peace. Swedish "Flying Jacob" and Native American fry bread may do the trick.
