= Dominican Day Parade =

Annual parade in New York City

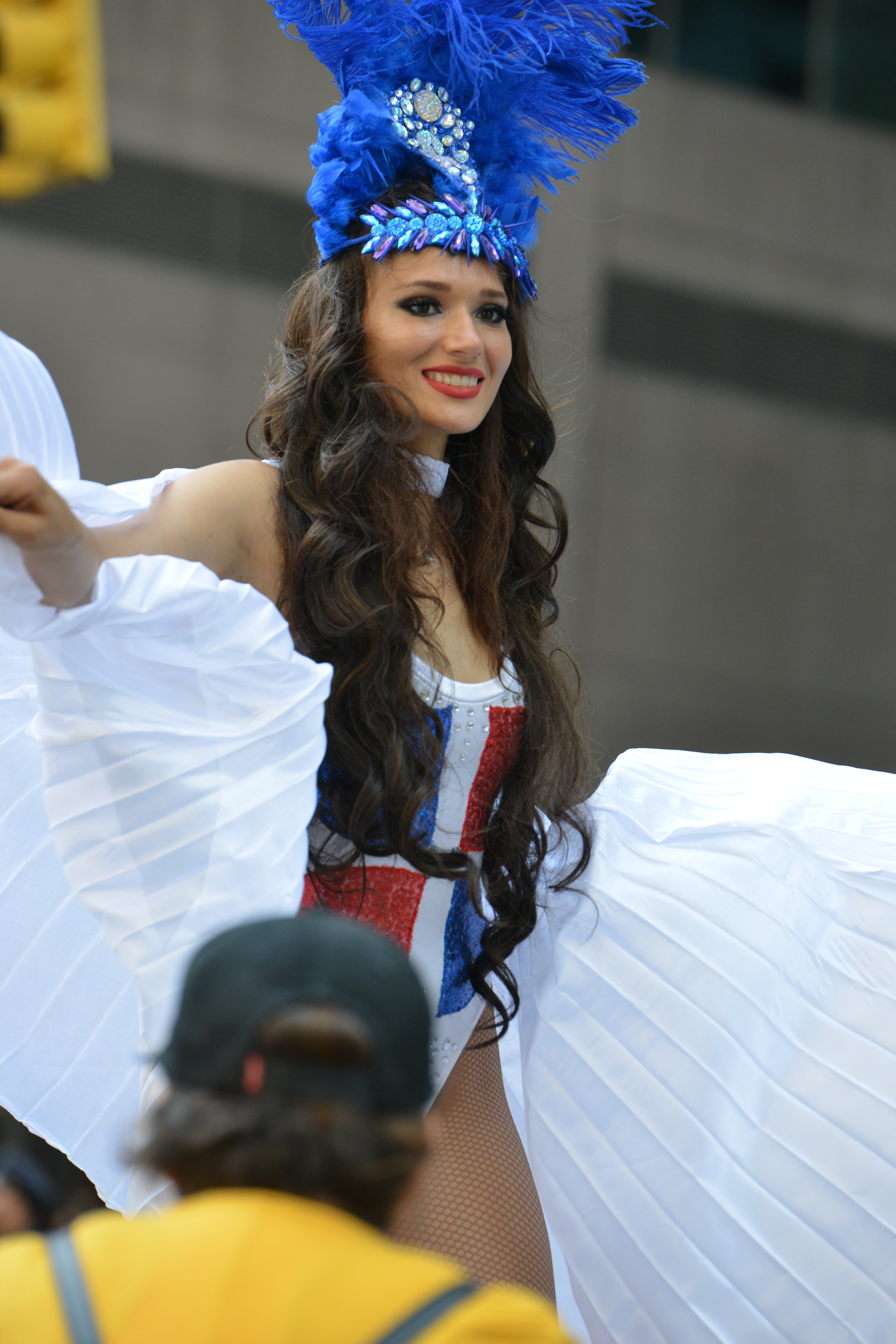
- Flag dress in Dominican Parade
- Status: Active
- Genre: Parade
- Frequency: 2nd Sunday of August
- Venue: 6th Avenue
- Location: New York City
- Country: United States

The National Dominican Day Parade in New York City is a parade organized by people of Dominican heritage in the city. The event started in 1982 as a local celebration with concerts and cultural events in the Washington Heights section of Manhattan. Organized by Dominican American community leaders, the parade is held annually in August on 6th Avenue.

Similar parades to celebrate the culture of the Dominican Republic are also held every year in Haverstraw, New York, Paterson, New Jersey, Boston, Lawrence, Massachusetts, Philadelphia, Providence, Rhode Island, and along the Grand Concourse in The Bronx.

In 2020, there was a Virtual Dominican Day Parade due to COVID restrictions.

== Parade and Related Events ==
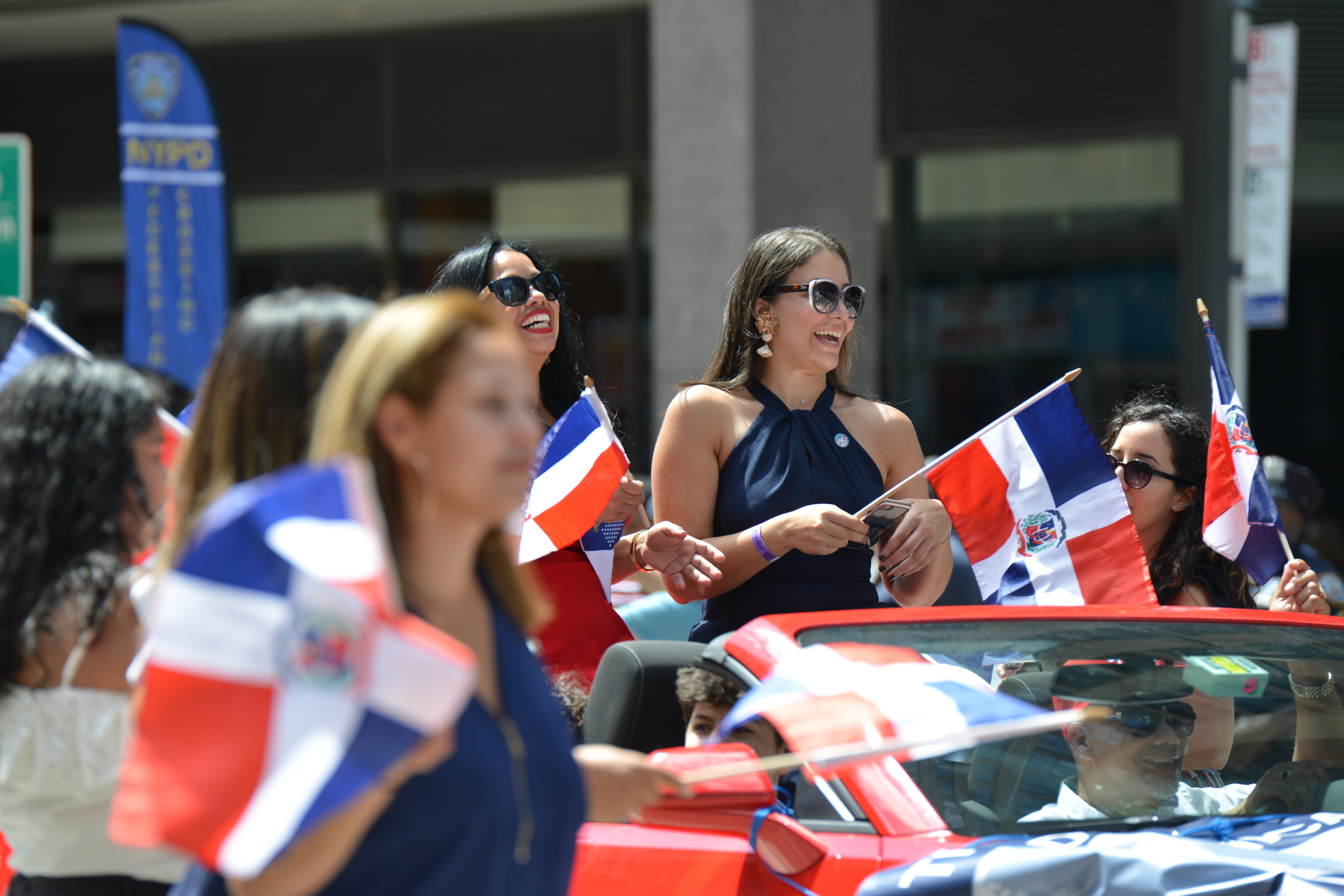
Dominicans in Dominican Day parade of 2019.

The parade is held on 6th Avenue in New York City. Marching proceeds from south to north, beginning on 38th Street.

There are a series of events leading to the National Dominican Day Parade.

Borough Presidents Heritage Events

- Bronx Dominican Heritage Celebration
- Queens Dominican Heritage Celebration
- Brooklyn Dominican Heritage Celebration
- Manhattan Dominican Heritage Celebration

A gala is held on the second Friday in August before Sunday's parade.

Visit: https:NatDDP.org for information.

A scholarship awards banquet takes place in the fall.

== Mission ==
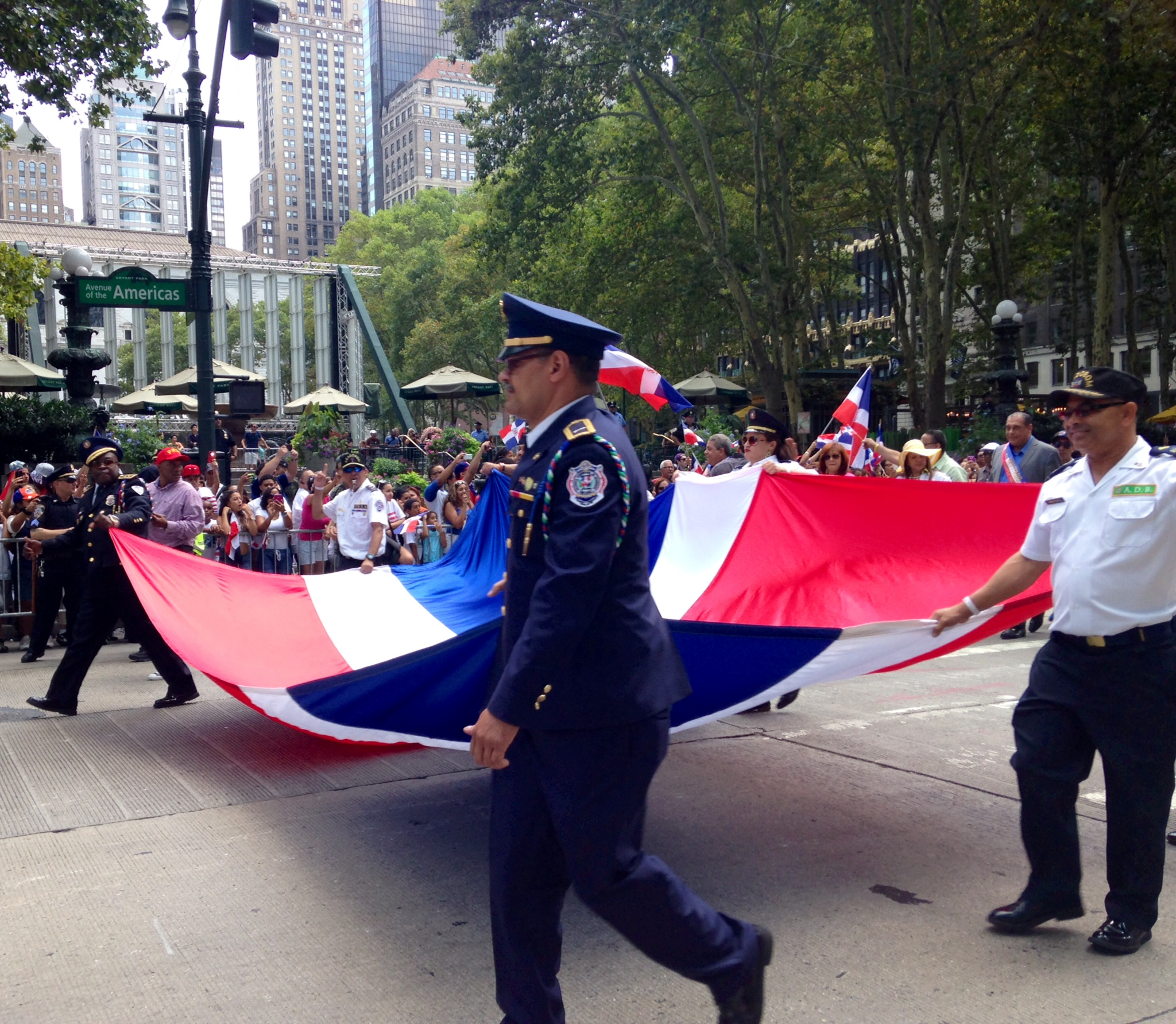
Dominican Parade, 2014

The newly formed Dominican Day Parade, Inc. is a nonprofit 501 (c) 3, non-partisan organization in formation that organizes the annual parade and festivities. The organization strives to provide an understanding of the heritage and contributions of the Dominican community in America and throughout the world. The mission of the Dominican Day Parade, Inc. is to celebrate the richness of the Dominican culture, folklore and popular traditions.

== Themes ==
The parade’s theme for 2015 is Education and Economic Empowerment. The organization recognizes the lack of resources for youth that seek a formal education. For that reason, Dominican Day Parade, Inc. has set a goal of creating a $250,000 Scholarship Fund. The fund, the first of its kind in the recent history of the parade, will help pay for education that will, in turn, economically empower young Dominicans throughout the United States.

2020: Virtual Parade

2021: Moving Forward.

2022: Empowering the Dominican Legacy

2023: Our History, Our People.

== Board of directors ==
Over the past several years, the leadership of the Dominican Day Parade had been under scrutiny because the non-profit organization at its helm was not being run according to New York State law. Under the direction of Attorney General Eric T. Schneiderman and Mayor Bill de Blasio, along with other elected officials and community leaders, in 2015, an entirely new entity and Board of Directors were created for what is now called the Dominican Day Parade, Inc. The new members of the board include many distinguished people from the Dominican-American community, representing a variety of industries and backgrounds.

EXECUTIVE TEAM

- Cristina Contreras: Chair, Board of Directors
- Wilton Cedeno: Immediate Past Chair, Special Advisor
- Dorian Rojas: Chair, Development Committee
- José Ramón Martínez: 1st Vice President. Co-Chair, Scholarship Committee
- Leonardo Iván Dominguez: 2nd Vice President. Co-Chair, Culture, Arts & Education Committee
- Manny Saez: Treasurer

BOARD OF DIRECTORS

- María T. Osorio: Secretary
- Bernardo “Bernie” Rodriguez: Chair, Volunteer Committee
- Ysmael DeCastro: Chair, Audit Committee
- Alexander Nunez-Torres: Co-Chair, Scholarship Committee
- María M. Khury: Board Member
- Gregoria Feliciano: Board Member
- María Lizardo: Board Member

== Date of Parade ==
The Dominican Day Parade is celebrated on the second Sunday of August to honor the start of the war for the "Second Independence" (La Guerra de la Restauracion). Under the leadership of General Gregorio Luperón, the war was ultimately won from Spain.

In 1844, the Dominican Republic secured its independence from Haiti and became a sovereign state until 1861. Under the leadership of General Pedro Santana, segments of the Dominican population sought to annex the Republic back to Spain and did so during March 18, 1861. On August 16, 1863, the start of the war for the Restoration of the Dominican Republic was under the command of General Luperon. The Dominican Republic originally declared its independence from Spain on December 1, 1821. Ultimately, the Dominican Republic was re-established, free from Spain, on March 3, 1865.

== Gallery ==
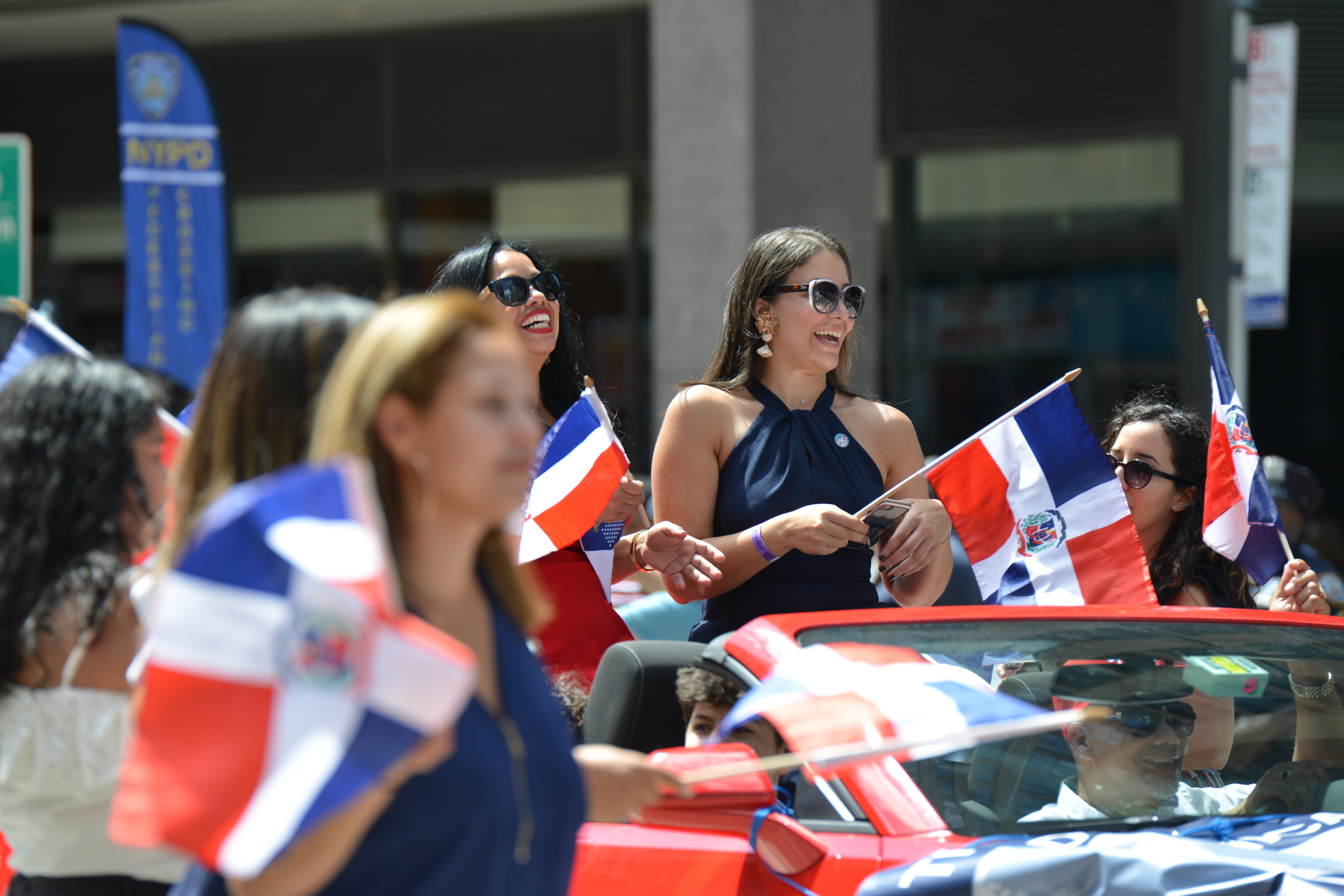
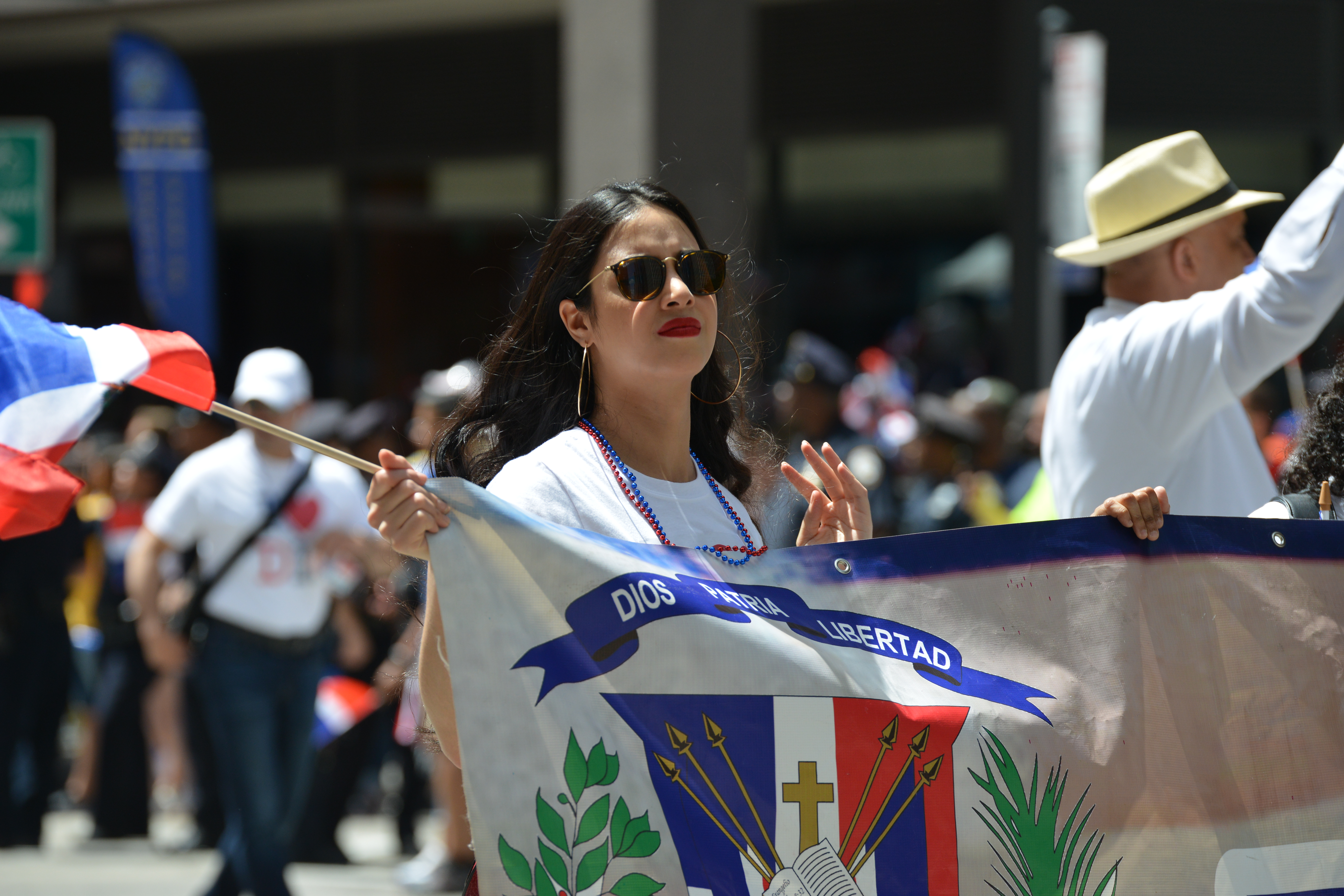
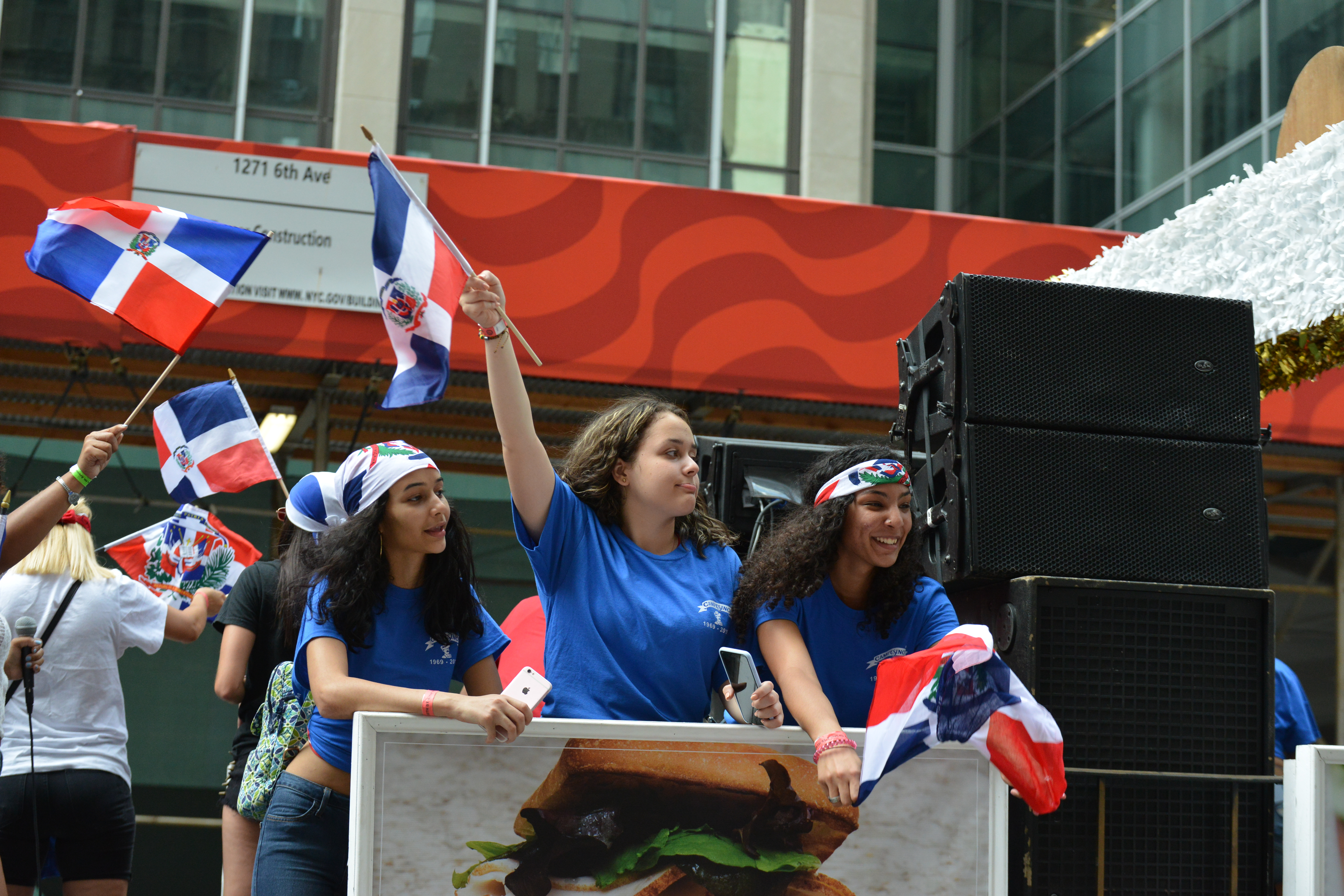
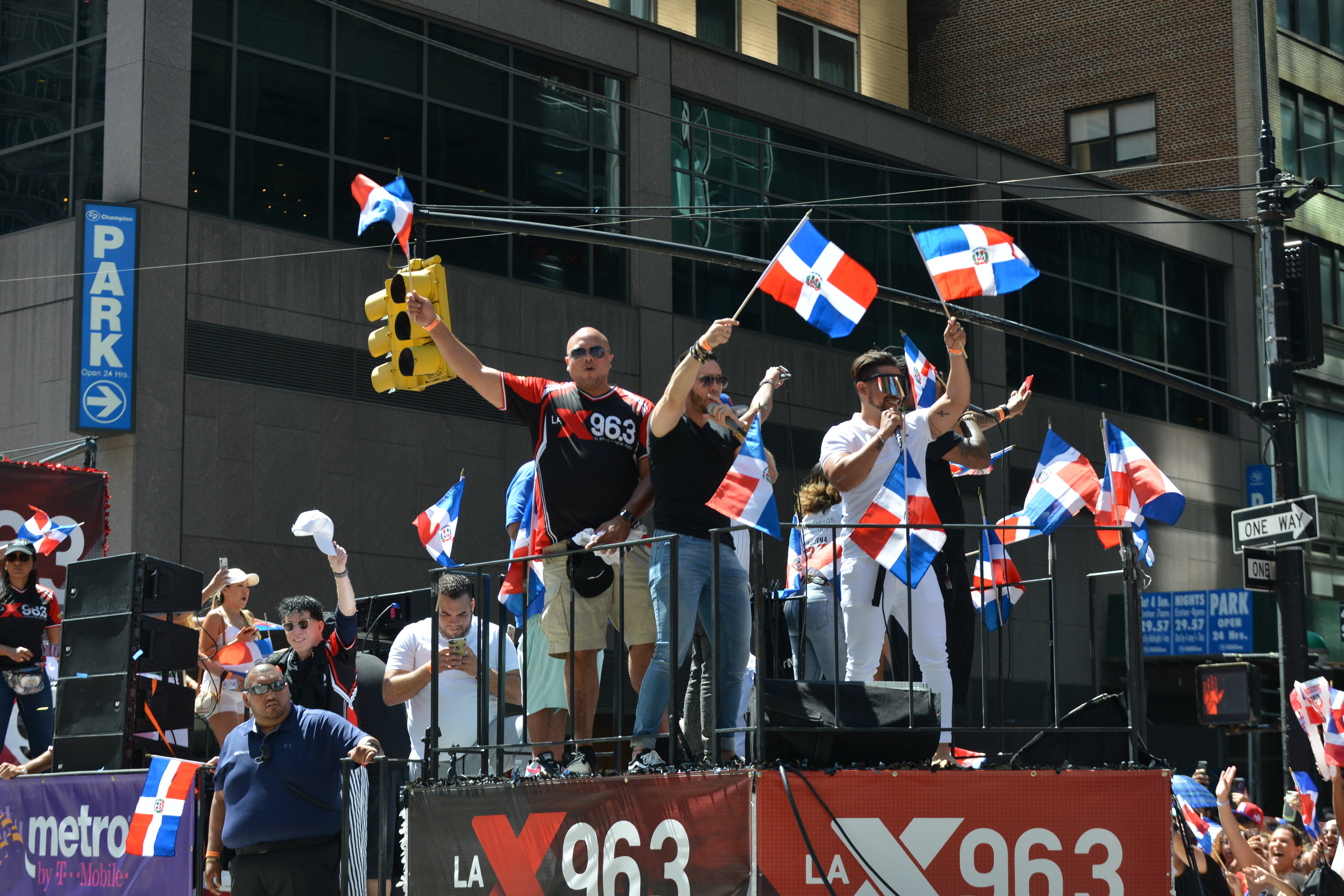
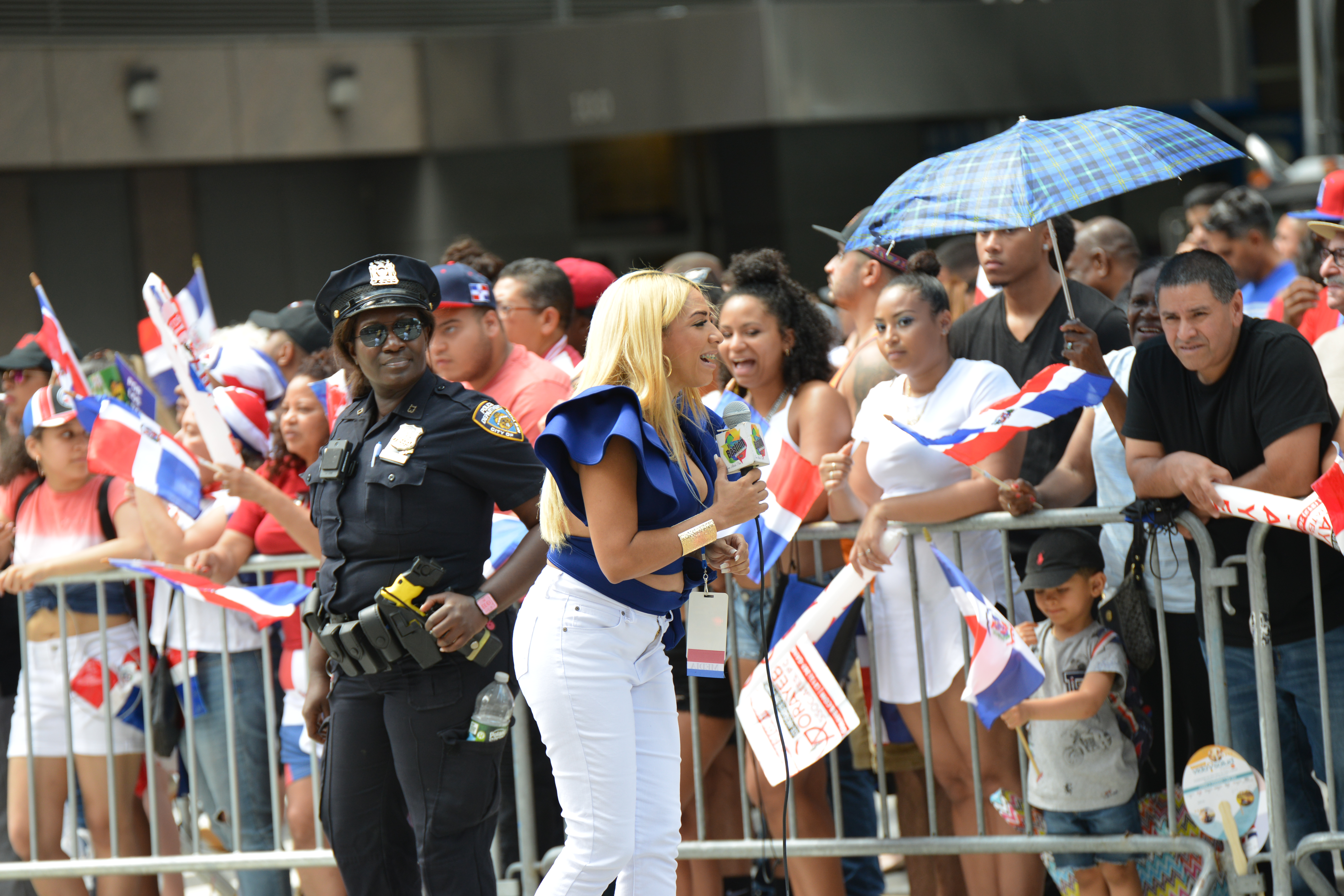
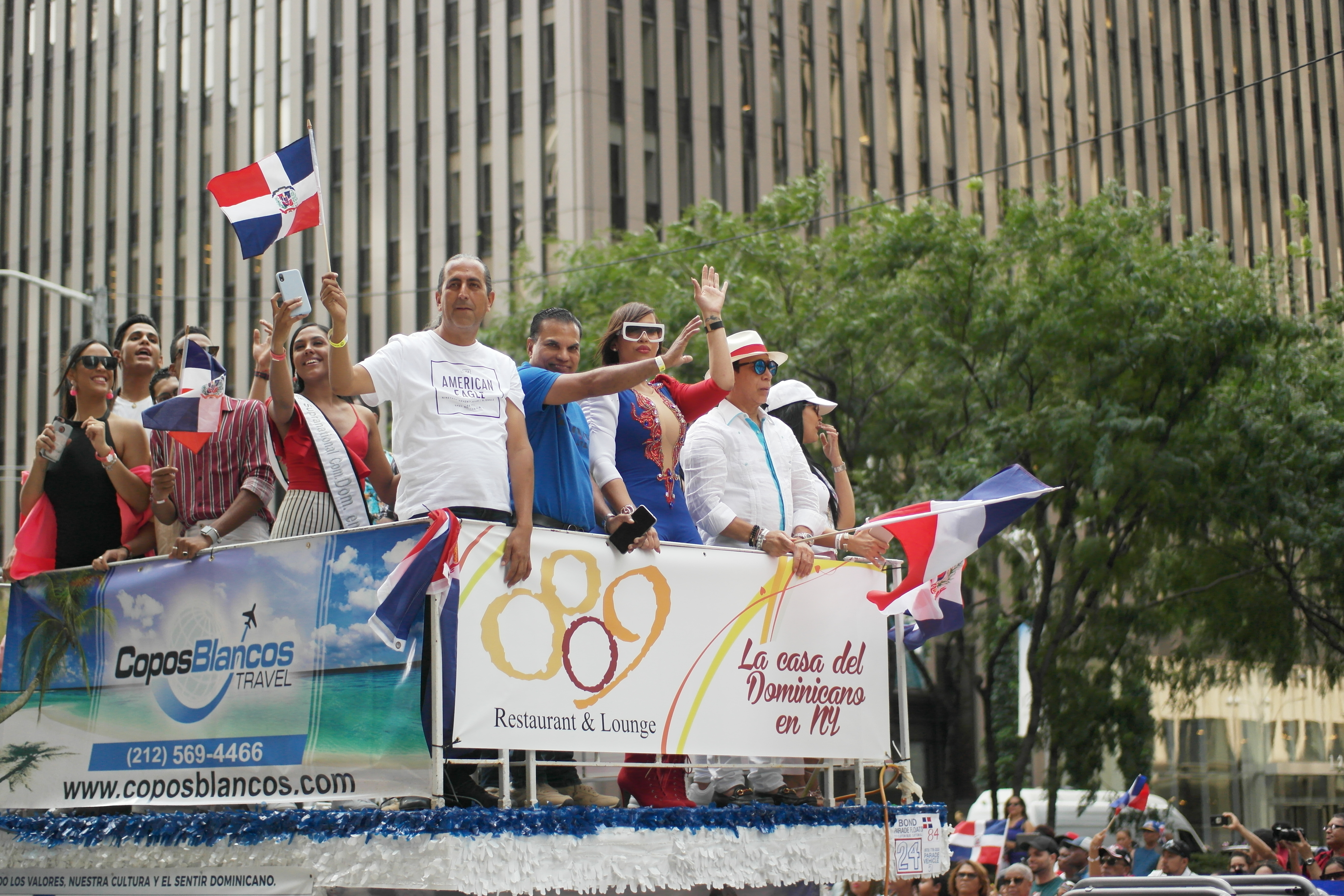
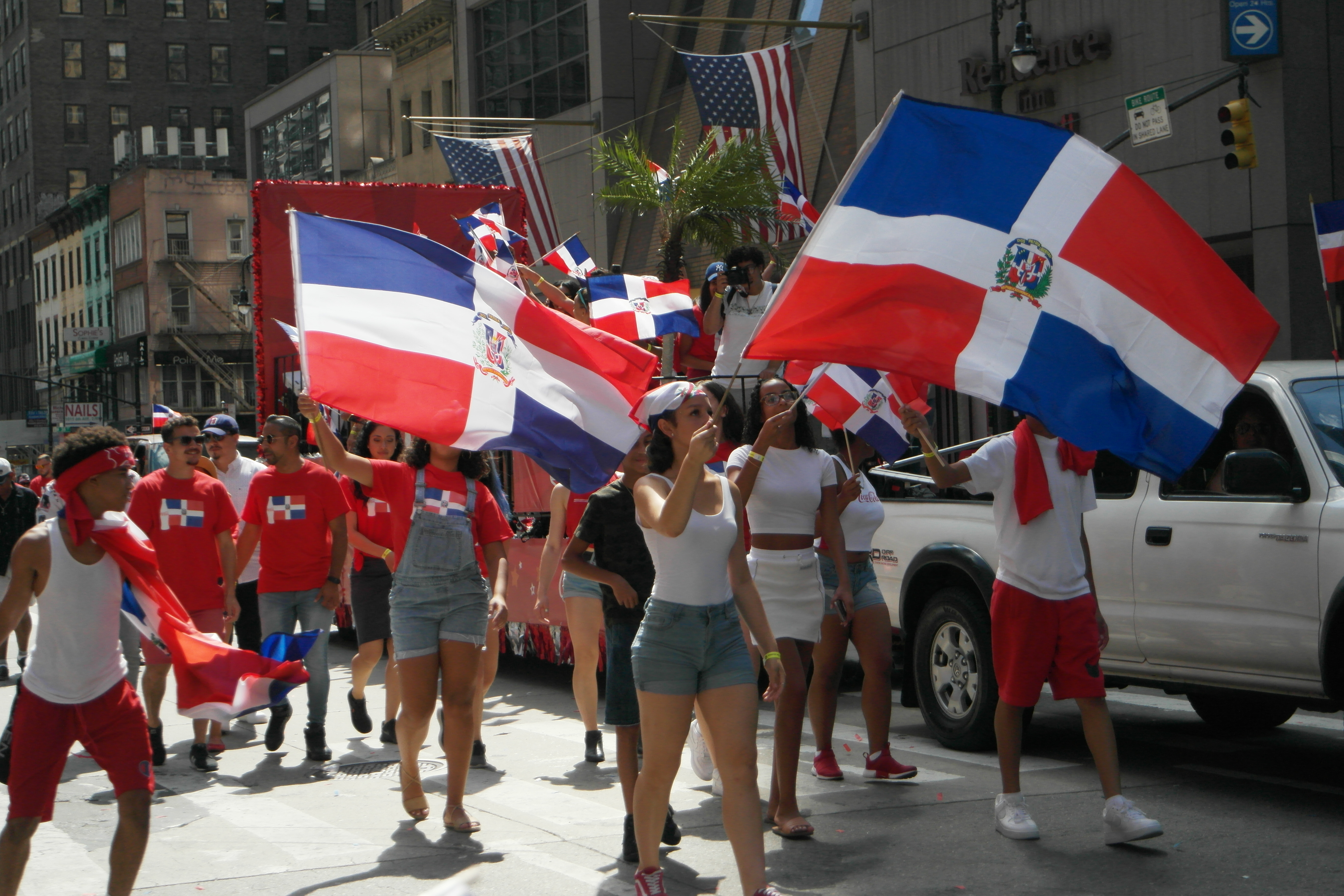
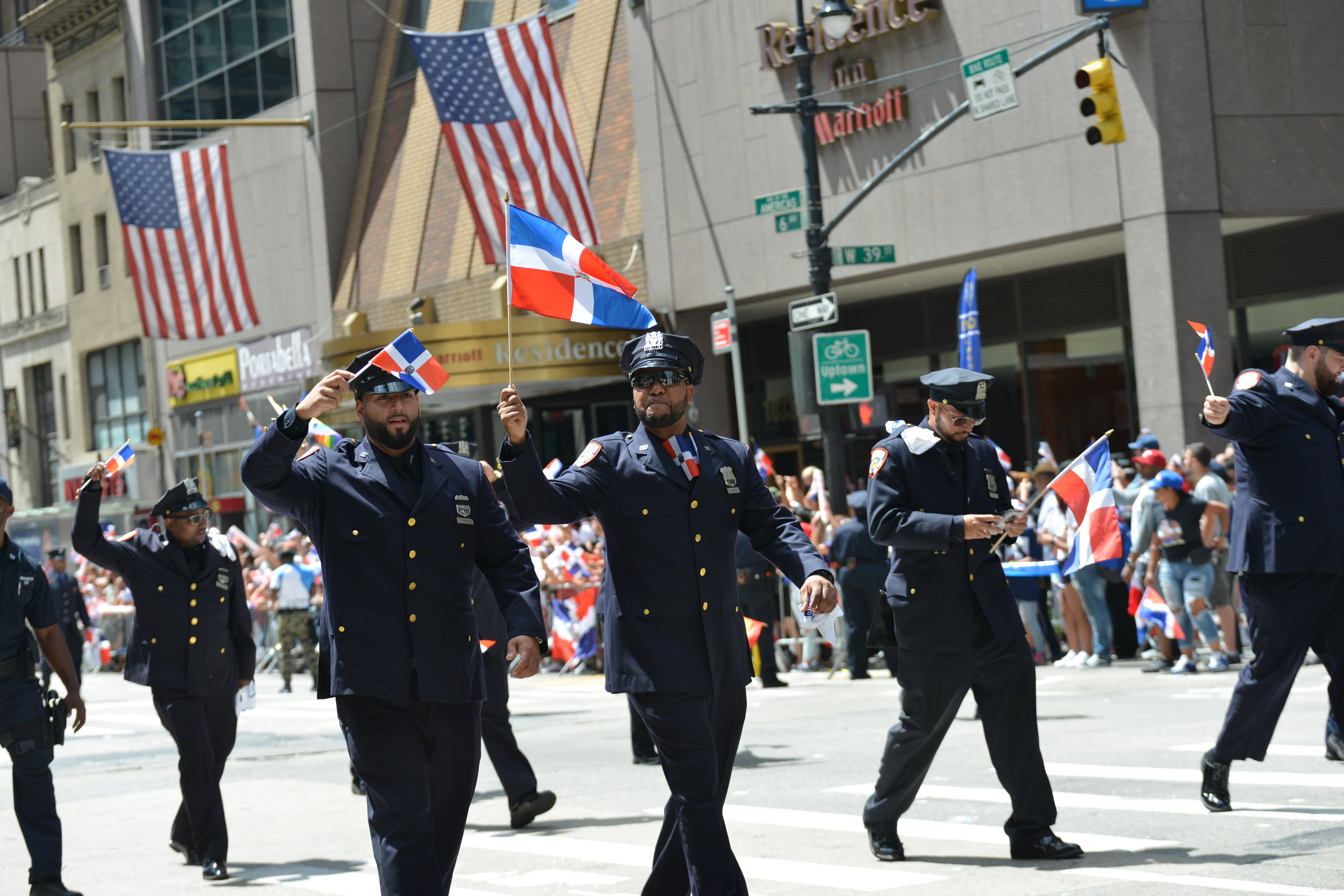
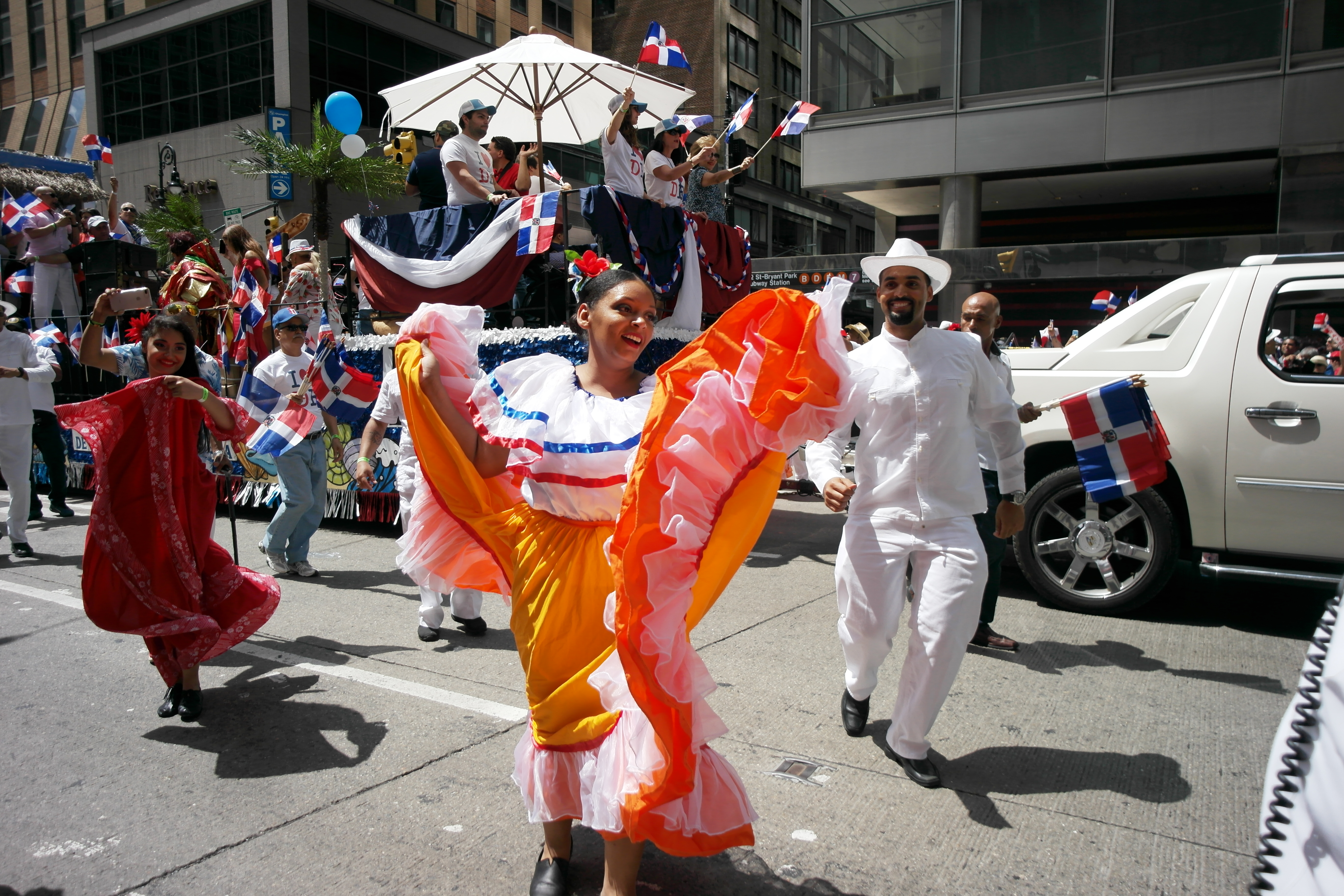
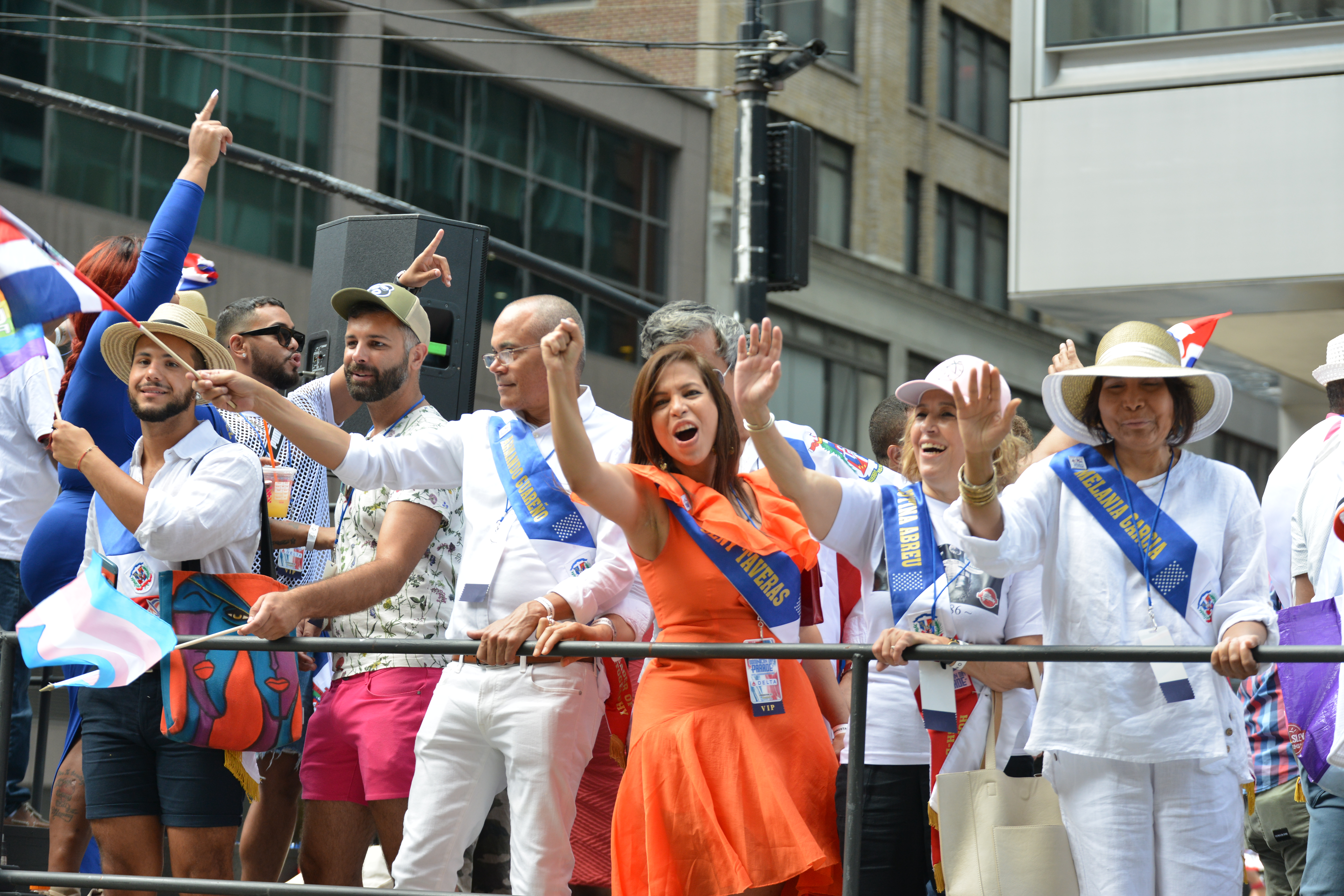
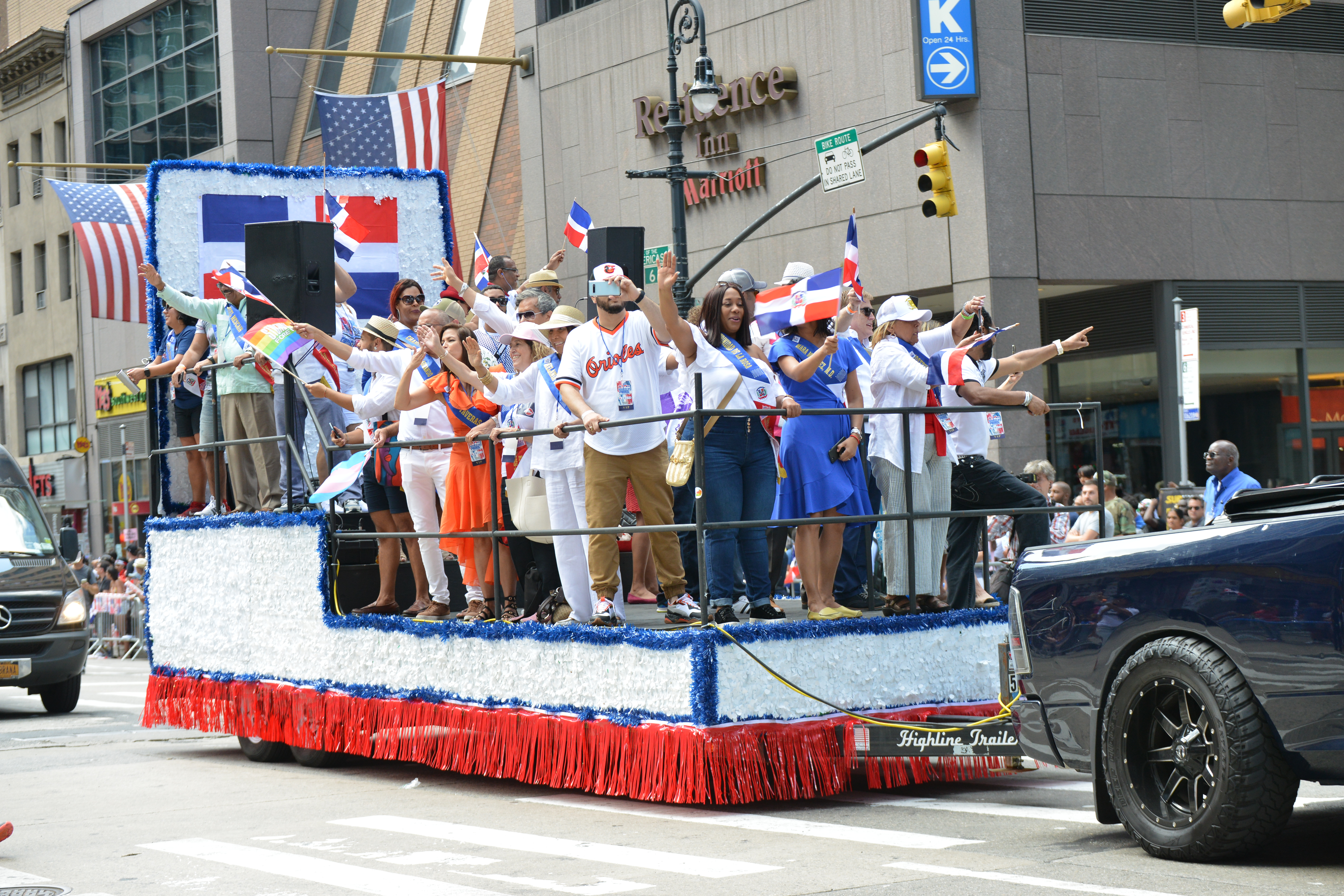
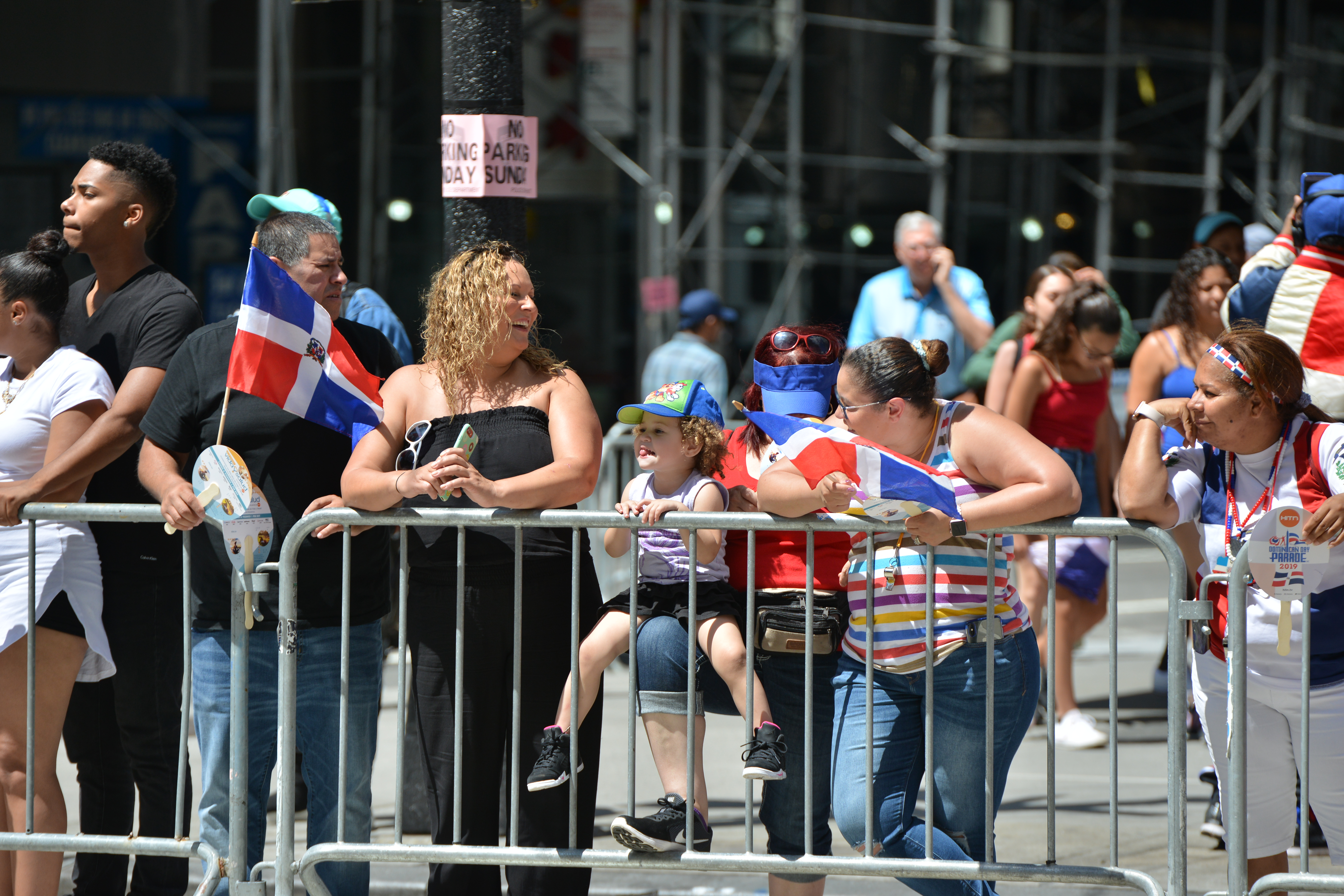
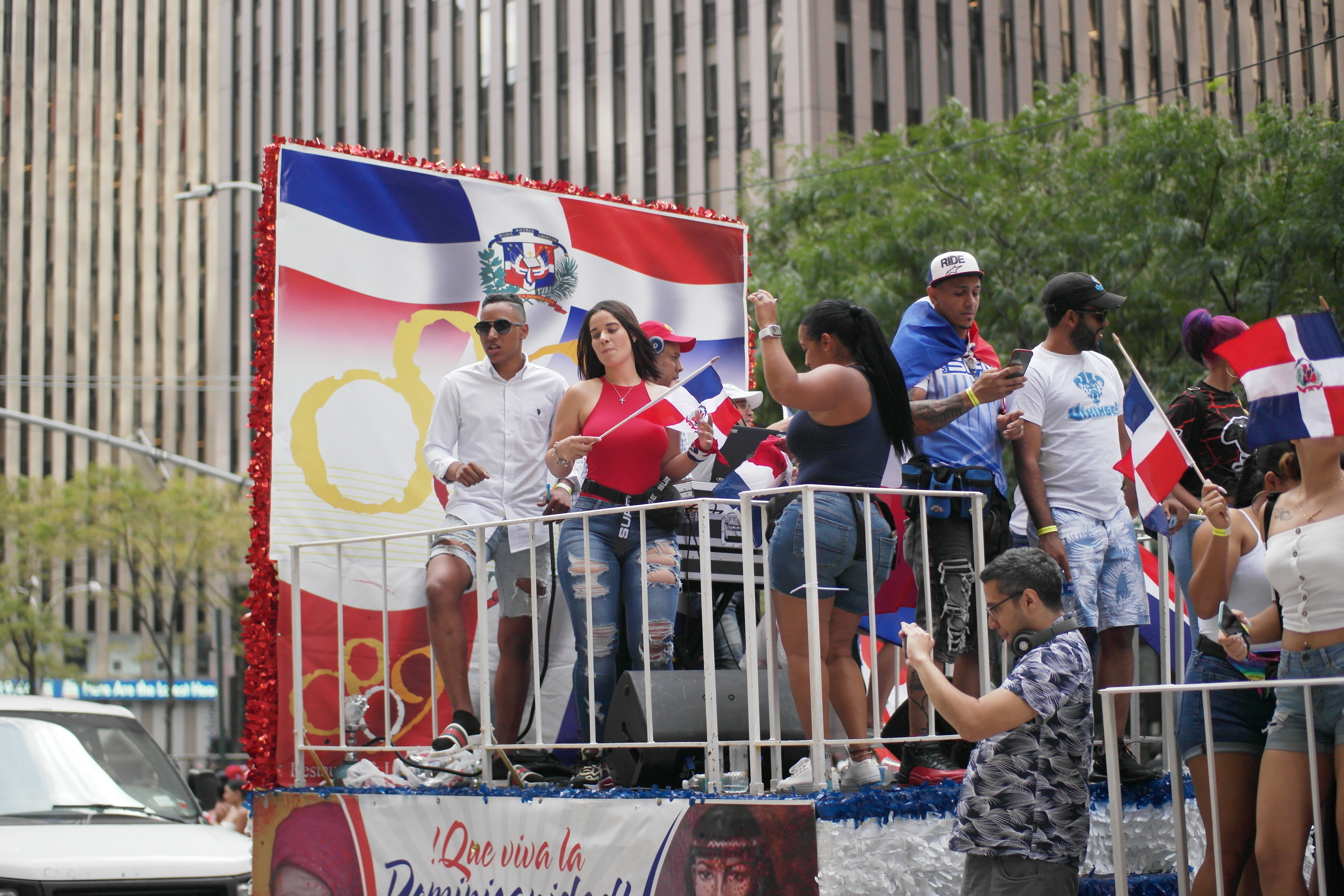
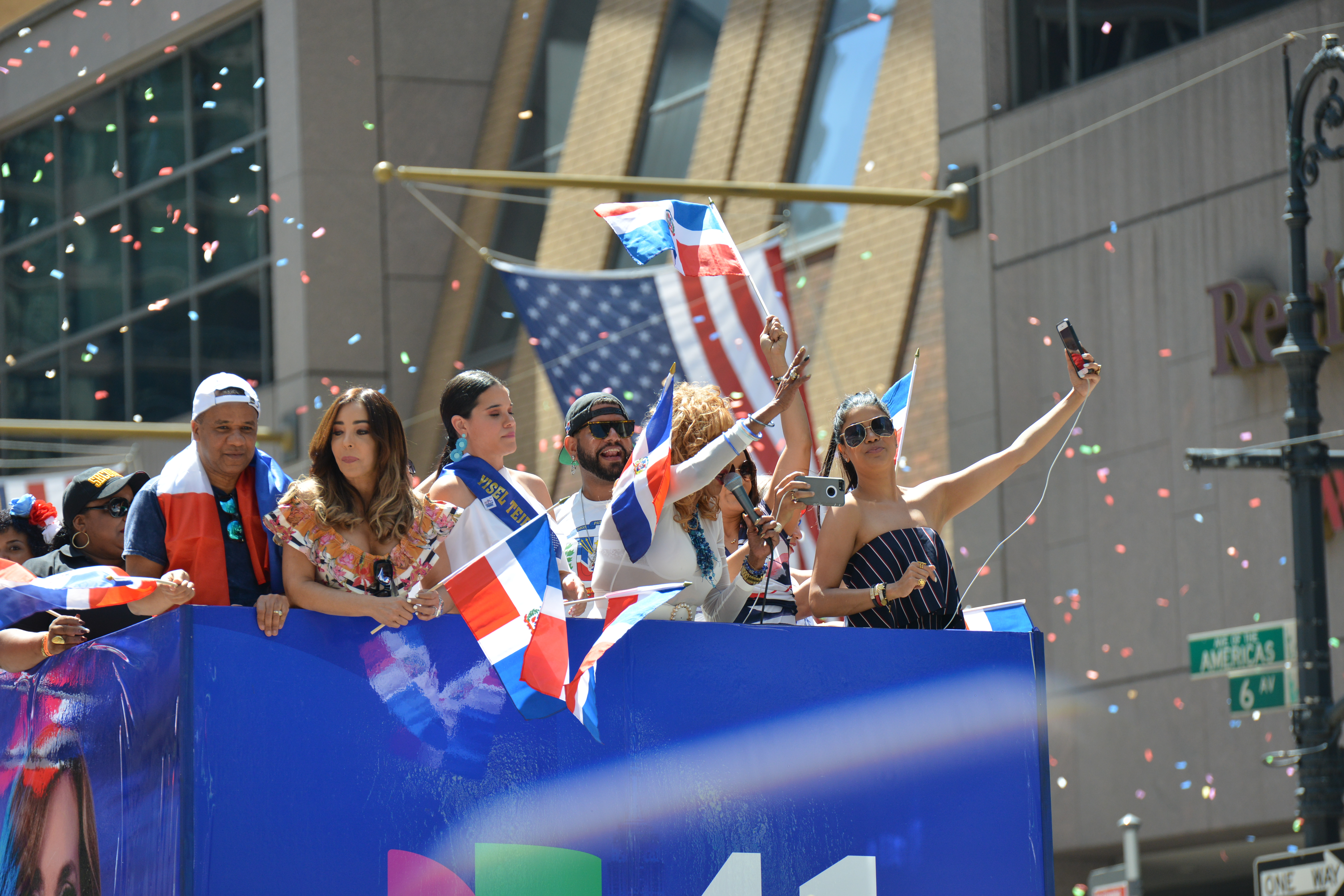
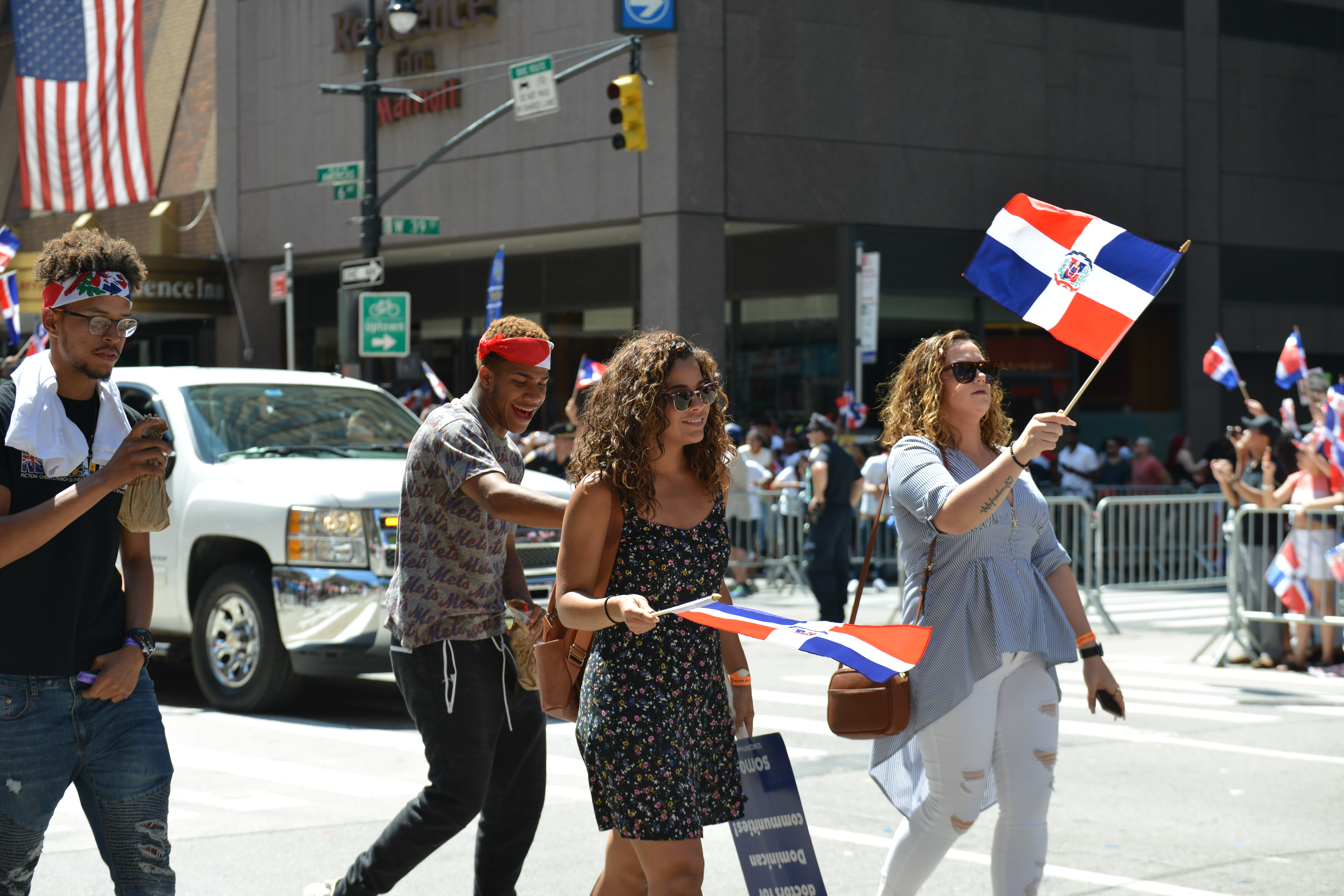
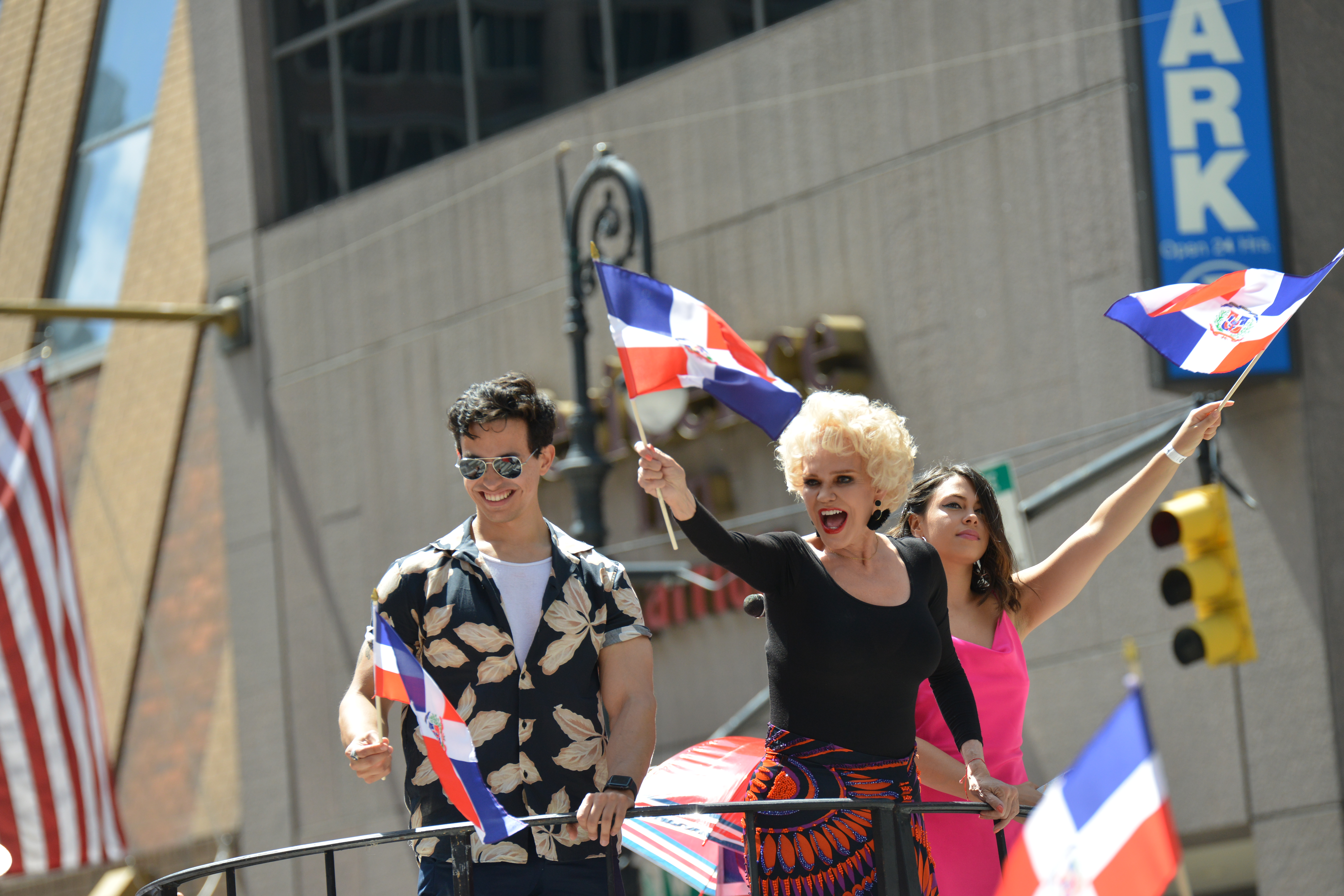
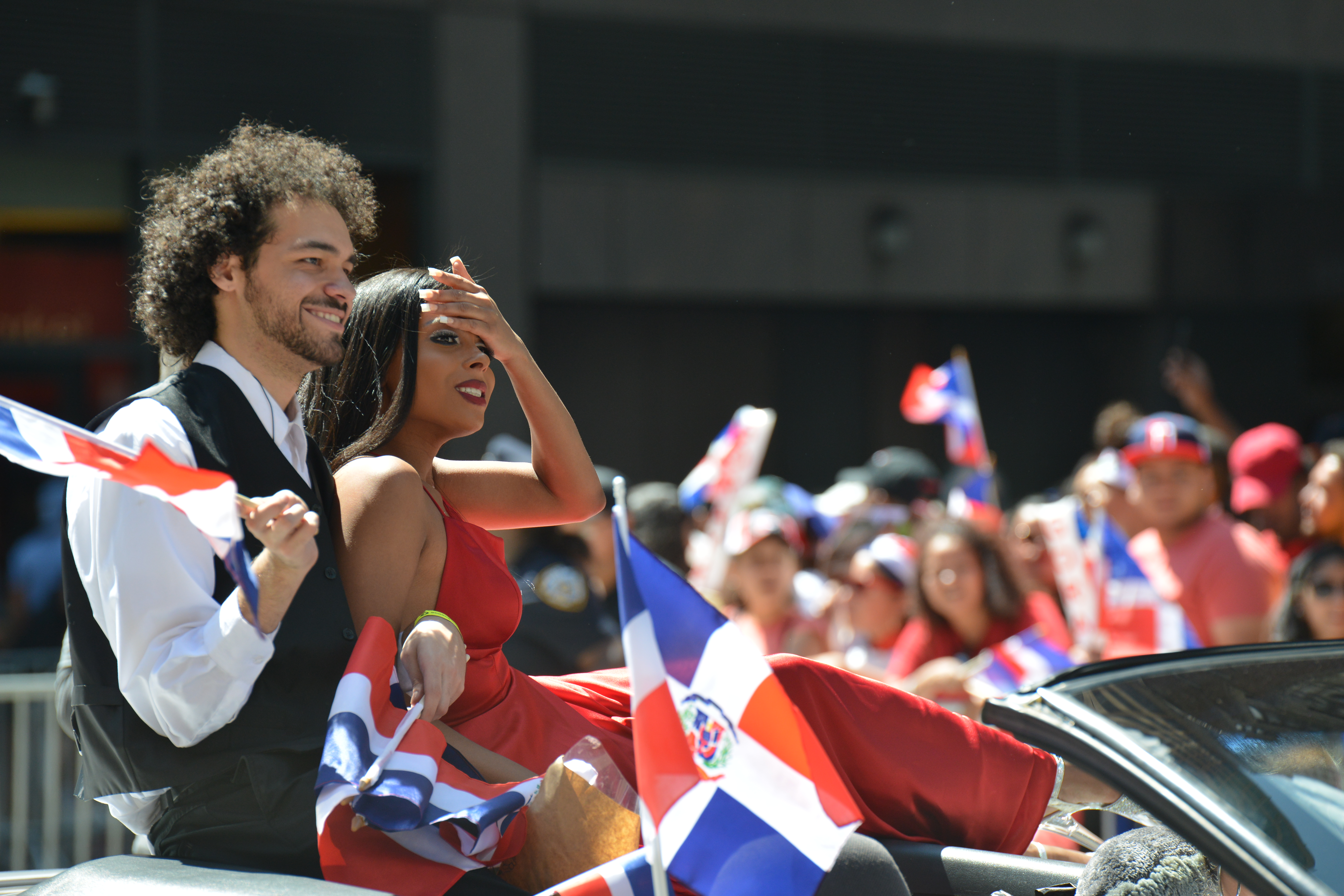
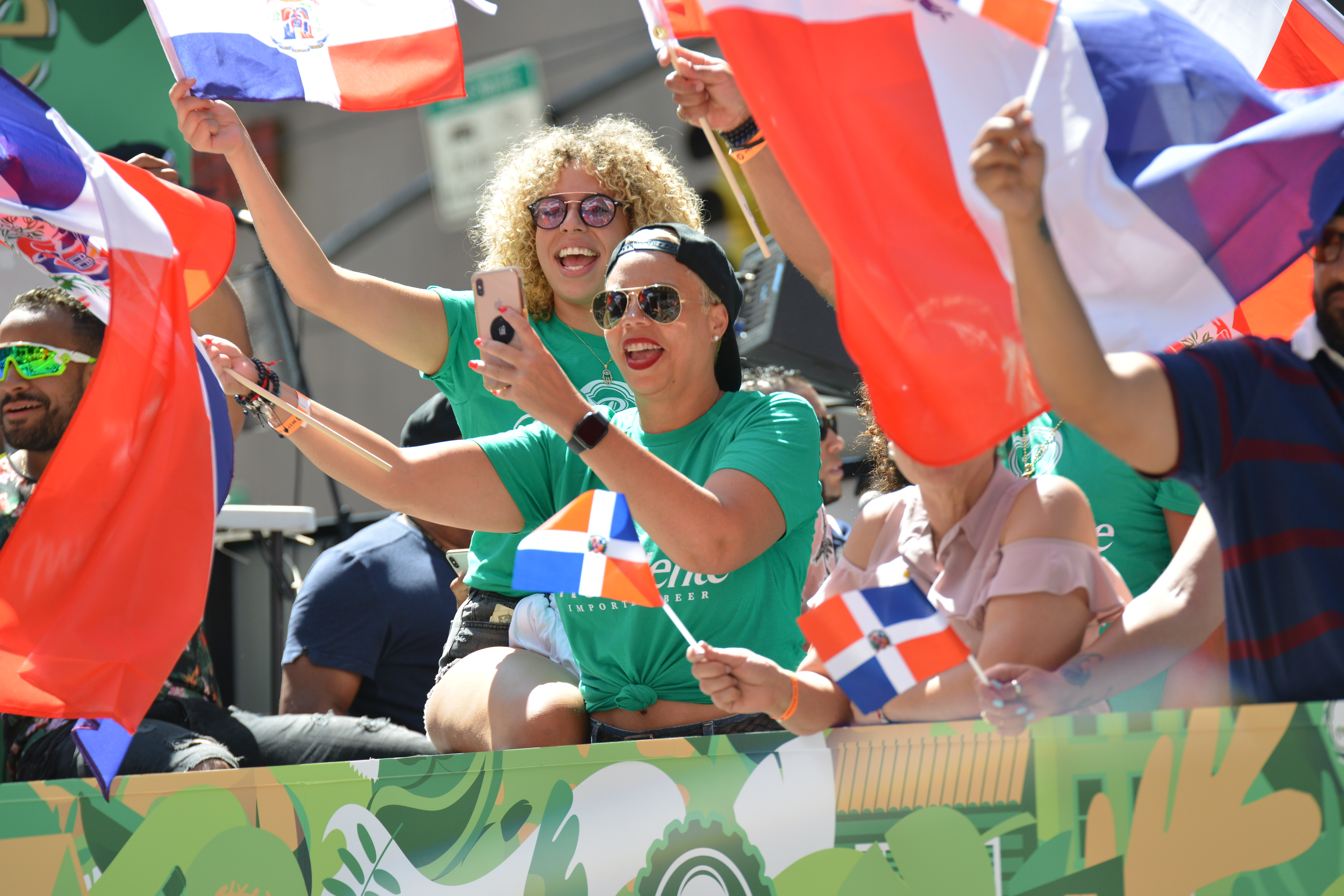
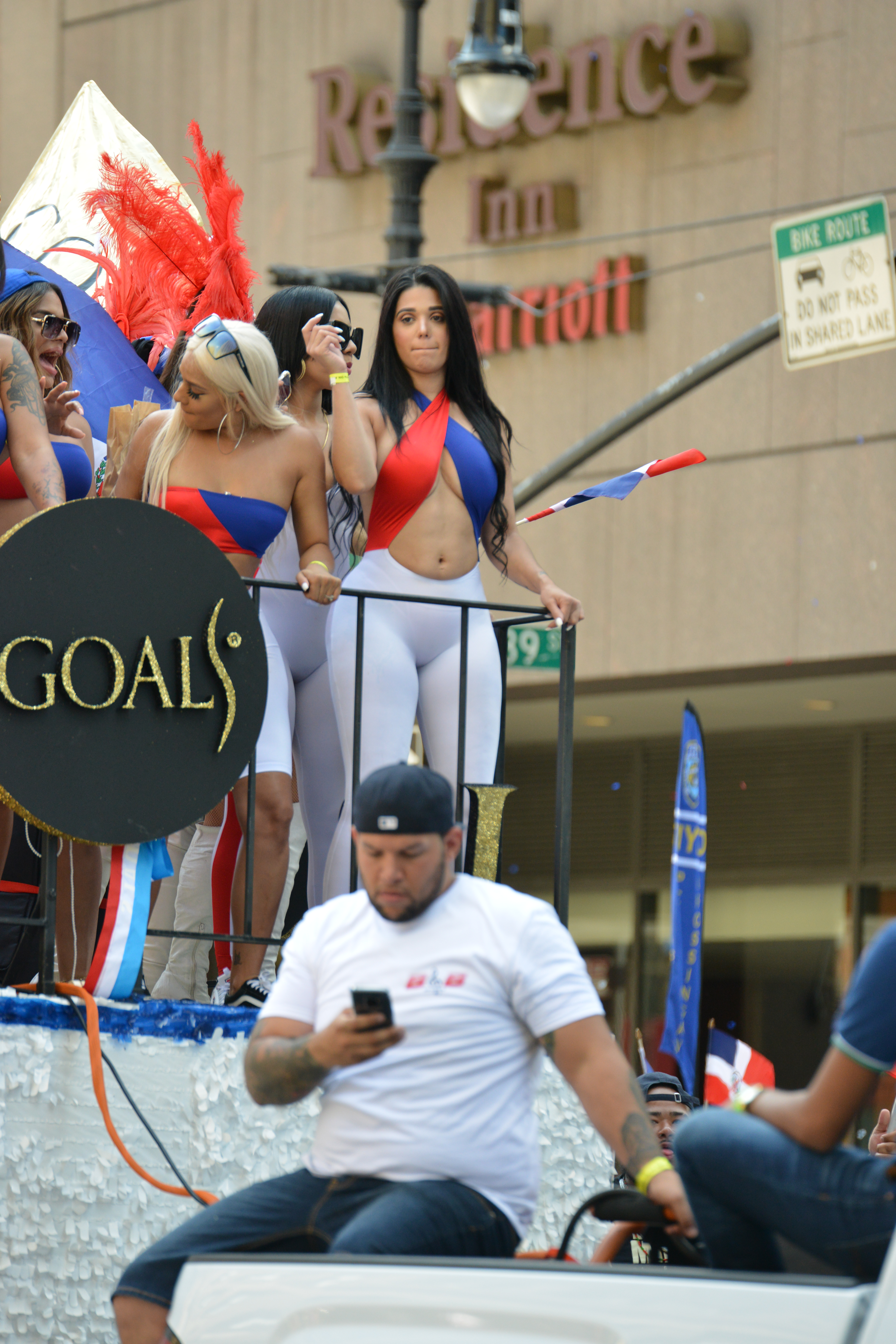
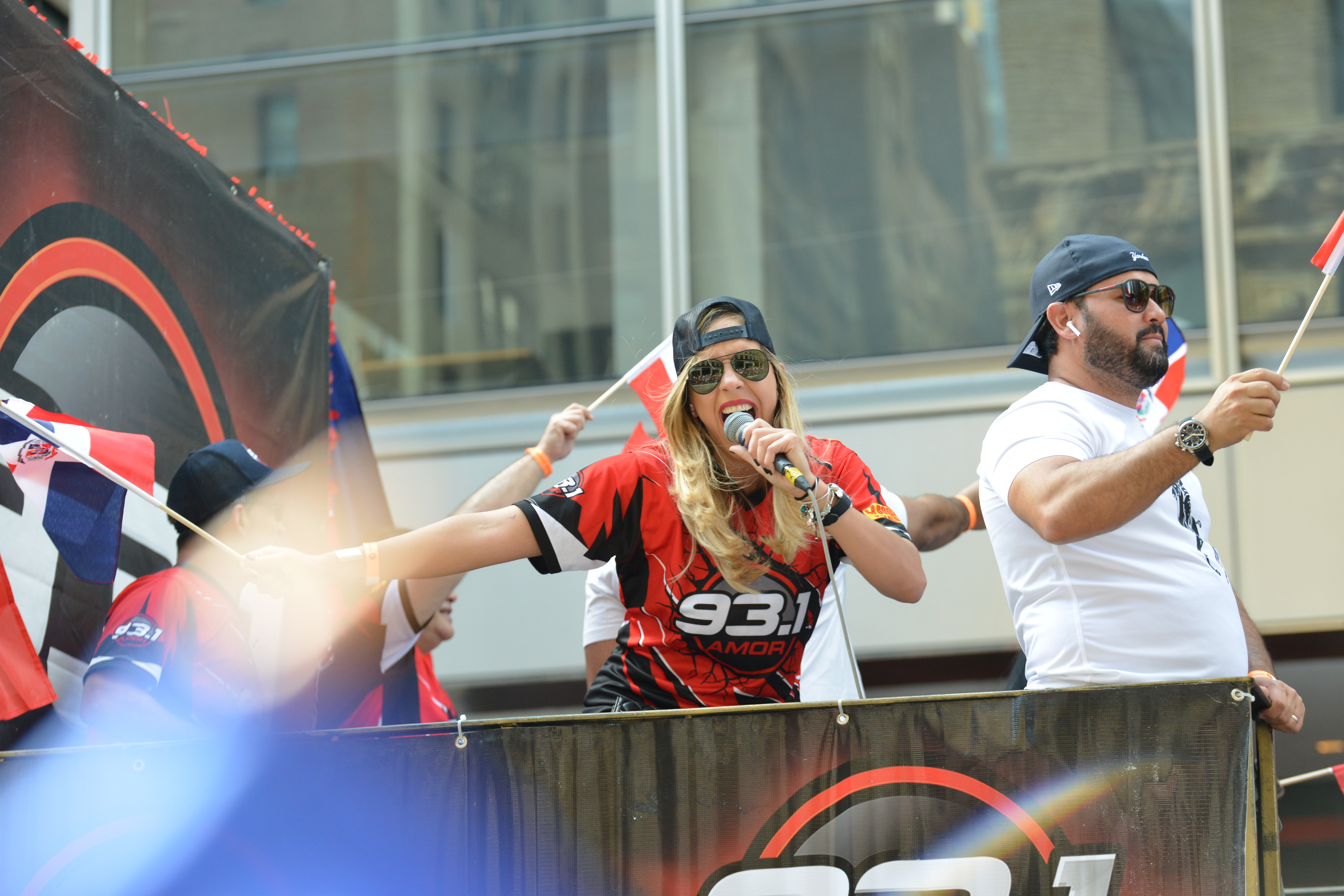
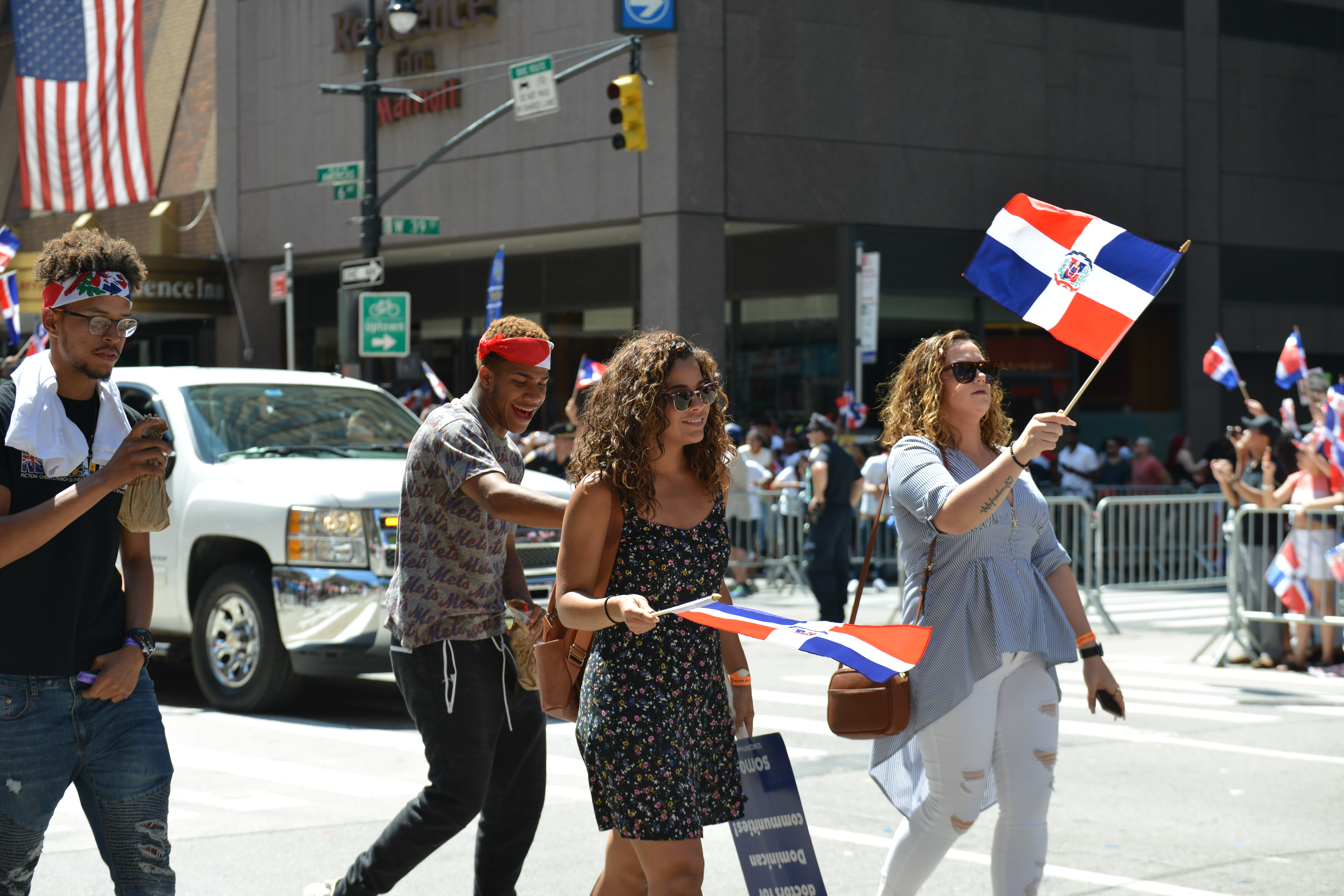
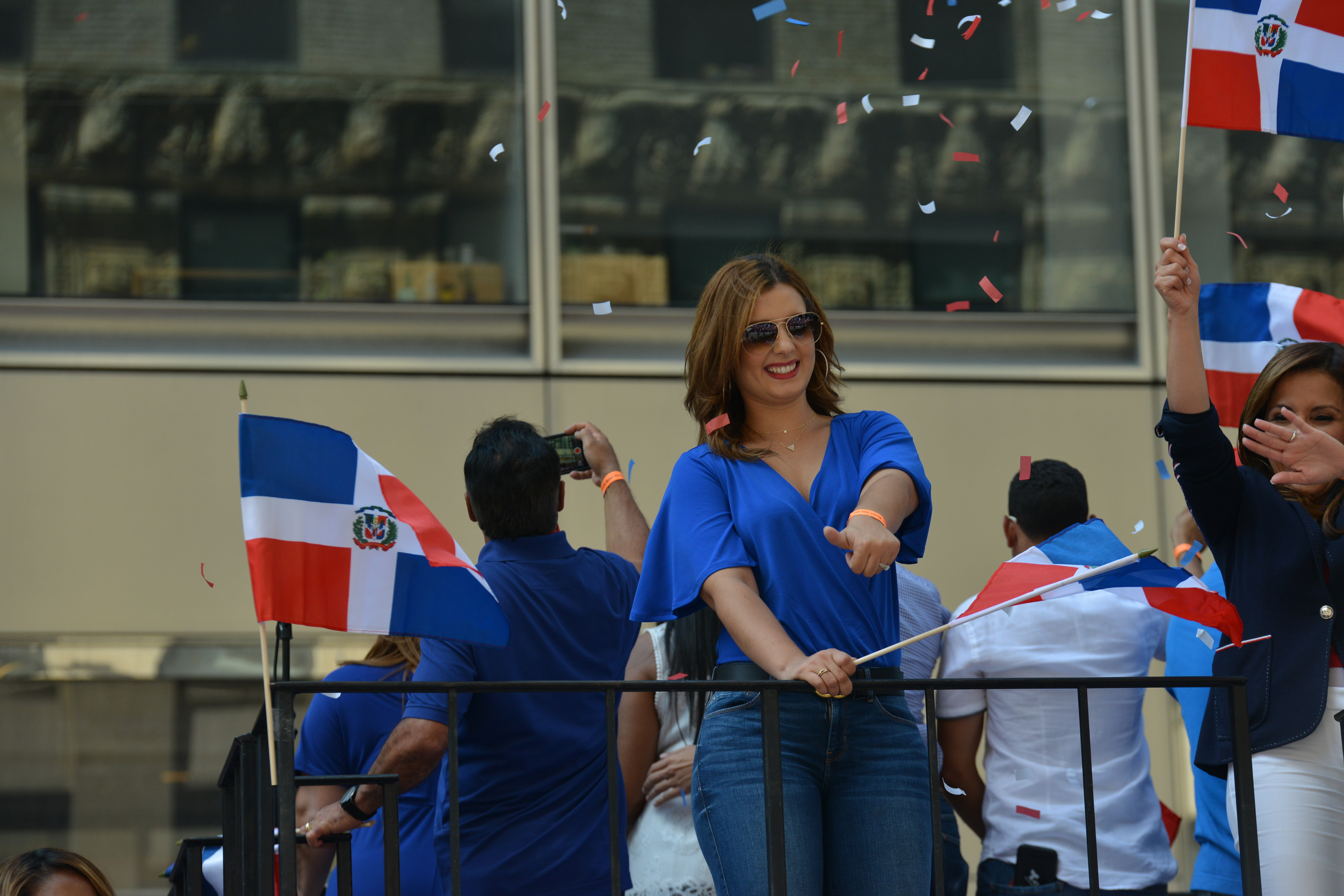

== See also ==
- Labor Day Carnival
- Puerto Rican Day Parade
