= City & State =

News outlet based in New York City

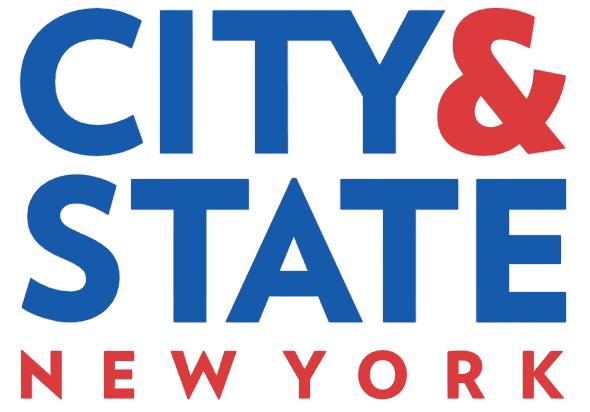

- July 13, 2026 issue of City & State, featuring caricature of Darializa Avila Chevalier
- Staff writers: 35
- Categories: Publishing company, news magazine
- Frequency: Weekly
- Founder: Tom Allon
- Founded: 2006
- First issue: 2006
- Company: Government Executive Media Group
- Country: United States
- Based in: New York City, U.S.
- Language: English
- Website: cityandstateny.com

City & State, formerly known as City Hall, is an American publishing company based in New York City. It was created in 2006 by publisher Tom Allon as a monthly newspaper City Hall. The company provides news, commentary and analysis. It publishes a weekly magazine and four daily newsletters, the most popular of which is First Read. City & State is owned Government Executive Media Group since 2021.

== History ==
In 2006, co-founder of The Hill newspaper Tom Allon created City Hall, a monthly newspaper that covered the politics of New York City. The newspaper was primarily funded by advocacy organizations, lobbyists and advertising revenue from Allon's political campaigns.

On December 5, 2011, City Hall and The Capitol, another newspaper about New York City owned by Allon, were merged and became a single publication called City & State. That year, City & State launched popular newsletter First Read, which is reportedly read by many high-ranking public officials, and a weekly magazine. In March 2012, editor-in-chief of City & State Adam Lisberg left the company to work at Metropolitan Transportation Authority as Director of External Communications.

On March 18, 2013, Tom Allon announced his withdrawal from the 2013 New York City mayoral election. He attributed the decision to him acquiring City & State and becoming its owner. In February 2015, Mayor of New York City Michael Bloomberg gave a shout-out to First Read on its first anniversary.

In March 2016, City & State expanded into Pennsylvania and created City & State Pennsylvania. The publication has two reporters and is led by David Alpher and Greg Salisbury, former editors of The Jewish Exponent. Allon said City & State Pennsylvania will publish a monthly print magazine starting in April 2016. On May 4, 2016, City & State bought Philadelphia community newspaper Philadelphia Public Record, and sought to expand its presence by hiring more writers and columnists.

In January 2021, Government Executive Media Group acquired City & State and City & State Pennsylvania. CEO of Government Executive Media Group Tim Hartman said the organization is aiming to expand City & State brand to Florida, California and Texas. In January 2022, the organization bought News Service of Florida making it a brand of City & State.

== Awards ==
In April 2017, City & State was awarded a first place prize by New York Press Association for its coverage of politics and elections. In May 2026, City & State was awarded four first place awards by New York Press Association for best design excellence, magazine cover, graphic illustration and personality profile.
