= Electoral history of Eric Adams =

Elections featuring the 111th Mayor of New York City

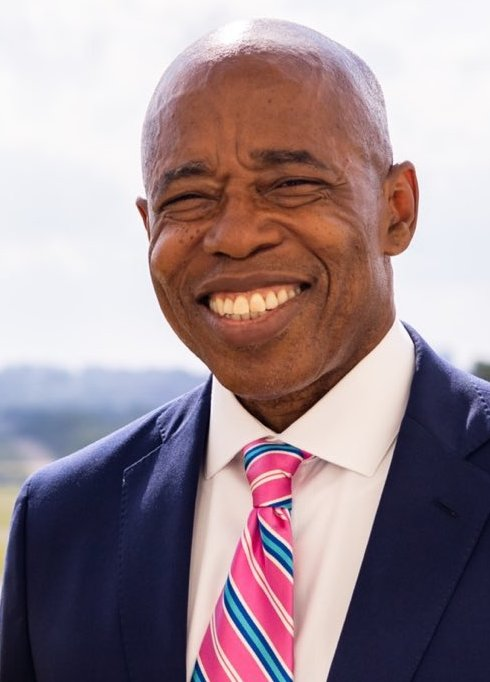
Eric Adams in 2021.

This is the electoral history of Eric Adams, the 111th Mayor of New York City in office from 2022 until 2025. Previously, he was Brooklyn Borough President from 2013 to 2021, and a member of the New York State Senate from the 20th district from 2007 to 2013.

== New York State Senate elections ==
=== 2008 ===
New York State Senate's 20th District 2008 General Election
Party	Candidate	Votes	%
Democratic	Eric Adams	70,000	93.3%
Republican	Stephen A. Christopher	5,000	6.7%
Total votes		75,000	100.00
Democratic hold			

=== 2010 ===
New York's 20th State Senate General Election 2010
Party	Candidate	Votes	%
Democratic	Eric Adams (incumbent)	51,598	92.2
Republican	Allan E. Romaguera	4,352	7.8
Total votes		55,950	100.0
Democratic hold			

=== 2012 ===
New York's 20th State Senate district election 2012 General Election
Party	Candidate	Votes	%
Democratic	Eric Adams (incumbent)	81,110	95.7
Republican	Rose Laney	2,683	3.2
Conservative	Brian Kelly	938	1.1
Total votes		84,731	100.0
Democratic hold			

== Brooklyn Borough President elections ==
=== 2017 ===
Brooklyn Borough President 2017 General election
Party	Candidate	Votes	%
Democratic	Eric Adams	251,247	74.84
Working Families	Eric Adams	27,241	8.11
Total	Eric Adams (incumbent)	278,488	82.95
Republican	Vito Bruno	41,955	12.50
Conservative	Vito Bruno	8,731	2.60
Total	Vito Bruno	50,686	15.10
Reform	Benjamin G. Kissel	6,017	1.79
Write-in		521	0.12
Total valid votes		335,712	93.75
Rejected ballots		22,373	6.25
Total votes		358,085	100.00
Democratic hold			

== New York City Mayoral election ==
=== 2021 ===
The following table shows the official results of votes as counted in a series of rounds of instant runoffs. Each voter could mark which candidates were the voter's first through fifth choices. In each round, the vote is counted for the most preferred candidate that has not yet been eliminated. Then one or more candidates with the fewest votes are eliminated. Two or more candidates will be eliminated in one round when those candidates' combined votes are less than the candidate immediately ahead of them. Votes that counted for an eliminated candidate are transferred to the voter's next most preferred candidate that has not yet been eliminated. Voters were allowed to mark five choices because of voting system limitations.

On June 29, the New York City Board of Elections became aware of a discrepancy in the unofficial results and subsequently posted in a tweet that both test and election night results were tallied together in an error, adding approximately 135,000 additional votes.

On July 6, after new vote tallies were released, Adams was declared the winner of the primary by the Associated Press.

2021 New York City mayoral Democratic primary election
Candidate	Round 1		Round 2		Round 3		Round 4		Round 5		Round 6		Round 7		Round 8	
Candidate	Votes	%	Votes	%	Votes	%	Votes	%	Votes	%	Votes	%	Votes	%	Votes	%
Eric Adams	289,403	30.7%	289,603	30.8%	290,055	30.8%	291,806	31.2%	295,798	31.7%	317,092	34.6%	354,657	40.5%	404,513	50.4%
Kathryn Garcia	184,463	19.6%	184,571	19.6%	184,669	19.6%	186,731	19.9%	191,876	20.5%	223,634	24.4%	266,932	30.5%	397,316	49.6%
Maya Wiley	201,127	21.4%	201,193	21.4%	201,518	21.4%	206,013	22.0%	209,108	22.4%	239,174	26.1%	254,728	29.1%	Eliminated	
Andrew Yang	115,130	12.2%	115,301	12.2%	115,502	12.3%	118,808	12.6%	121,597	13.0%	135,686	14.8%	Eliminated			
Scott Stringer	51,778	5.5%	51,850	5.5%	51,951	5.5%	53,599	5.7%	56,723	6.1%	Eliminated					
Dianne Morales	26,495	2.8%	26,534	2.8%	26,645	2.8%	30,157	3.2%	30,933	3.3%	Eliminated					
Raymond McGuire	25,242	2.7%	25,272	2.7%	25,418	2.7%	26,361	2.8%	27,934	3.0%	Eliminated					
Shaun Donovan	23,167	2.5%	23,189	2.5%	23,314	2.5%	24,042	2.6%	Eliminated							
Aaron Foldenauer	7,742	0.8%	7,758	0.8%	7,819	0.8%	Eliminated									
Art Chang	7,048	0.7%	7,064	0.8%	7,093	0.8%	Eliminated									
Paperboy Prince	3,964	0.4%	4,007	0.4%	4,060	0.4%	Eliminated									
Joycelyn Taylor	2,662	0.3%	2,683	0.3%	2,780	0.3%	Eliminated									
Isaac Wright Jr.	2,242	0.2%	2,254	0.2%	Eliminated											
Write-ins	1,568	0.2%	Eliminated													
Inactive ballots	0 ballots		752 ballots		1,207 ballots		5,314 ballots		8,062 ballots		26,445 ballots		65,714 ballots		140,202 ballots	

General election results
Party	Candidate	Votes	%	±%
Democratic	Eric Adams	676,481	66.14	
Republican	Curtis Sliwa	284,517	27.82	
Independence	Curtis Sliwa	8,610	0.84	
Animal Welfare	Curtis Sliwa			
Total	Curtis Sliwa	293,127	28.66	
Socialism and Liberation	Cathy Rojas	24,995	2.44	
Conservative	Bill Pepitone	11,668	1.14	
Empowerment	Quanda Francis	3,462	0.34	
Libertarian	Stacey Prussman	2,830	0.28	
Humanity United	Raja Flores	2,155	0.21	
Save Our City	Fernando Mateo	1,695	0.17	
Out Lawbreaker	Skiboky Stora	250	0.02	
Write-in		6,139	0.60	
Total votes		1,022,802		

=== 2025 ===
2025 New York City mayoral election
Party	Candidate	Votes	%	±%
Democratic	Zohran Mamdani	944,950	43.07%	−22.12%
Working Families	Zohran Mamdani	169,234	7.71%	N/A
Total	Zohran Mamdani	1,114,184	50.78%	N/A
Fight and Deliver	Andrew Cuomo	906,614	41.32%	N/A
Republican	Curtis Sliwa	143,305	6.53%	−20.37%
Protect Animals	Curtis Sliwa	10,444	0.48%	N/A
Total	Curtis Sliwa	153,749	7.01%	−19.89%
Safe&Affordable/EndAntiSemitism	Eric Adams (incumbent) (withdrawn)	6,897	0.31%	N/A
Conservative	Irene Estrada	2,856	0.13%	−0.99%
Integrity	Jim Walden (withdrawn)	2,319	0.11%	N/A
Quality of Life	Joseph Hernandez	1,379	0.06%	N/A
Write-in		6,206	0.28%	−0.34%
Total votes		2,194,204	100%	
Democratic hold				
