= Cathy Rojas =

American educator and political activist

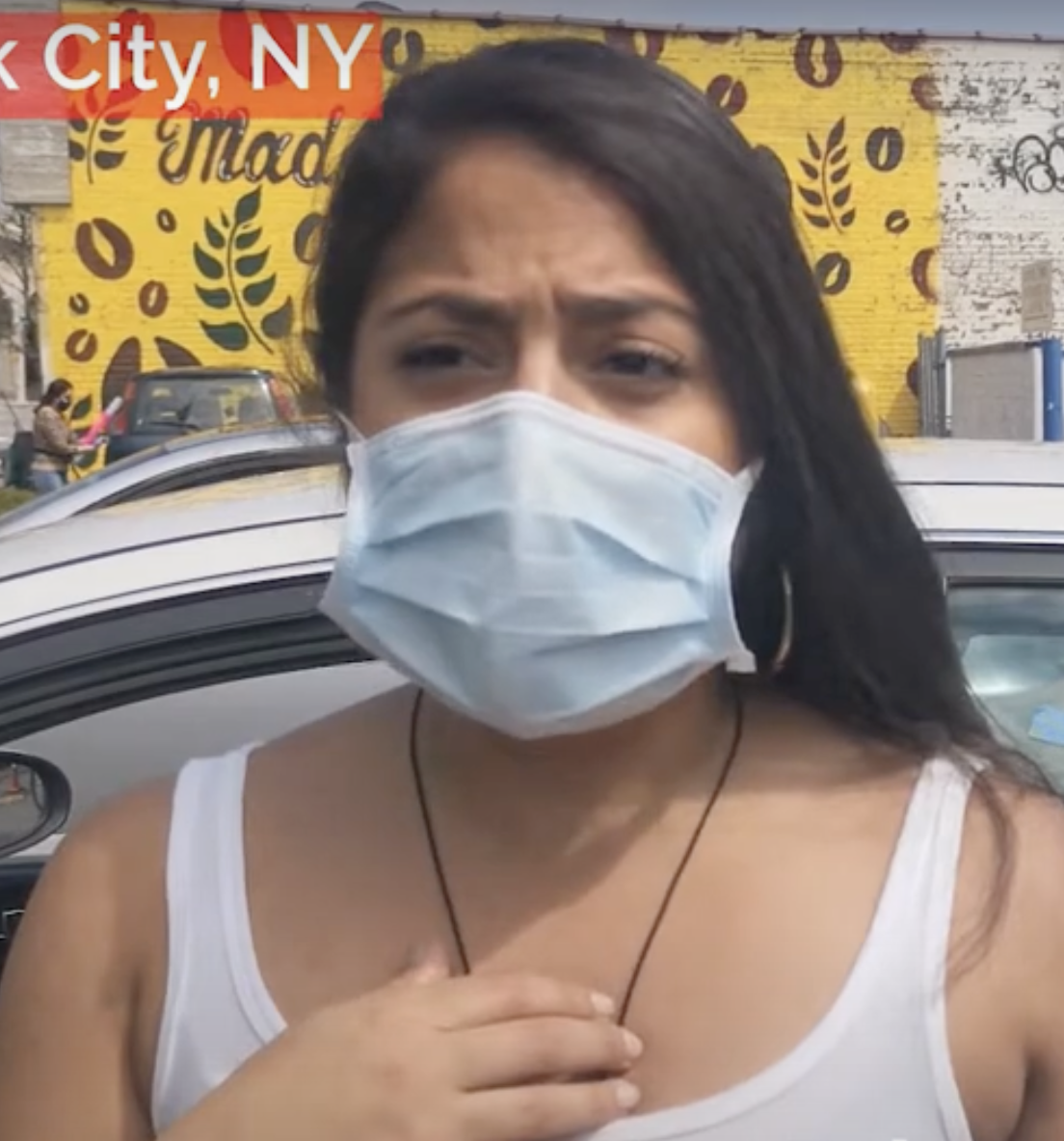
- Rojas in 2020
- Born: October 1991 (age 34); New York City, New York, United States
- Political party: Socialism and Liberation

Cathy Rojas (born October 1991) is a Colombian-American educator and political activist who was the Party for Socialism and Liberation's candidate for mayor of New York City in the 2021 election. A public school teacher by trade, Rojas received around 2.5% of the vote in the mayoral election, placing third.

== Early life ==
Rojas was born in 1991 to two Colombian immigrants in Queens, New York. She speaks English and Spanish. Her father was an auto body painter, and her mother a housekeeper. She experienced racism from a young age, and in public school, was made aware of the fact that students were expelled or arrested instead of being offered mental health services. Rojas became a socialist after reading The Autobiography of Malcolm X in high school. Her journey began in the service industry as a waitress, bartender, and cook, before she found her calling in community organizing and education, leading her to become a public high school teacher.

== Mayoral campaign ==
Rojas launched her mayoral campaign on June 28, 2021, in front of the First Spanish United Methodist Church in East Harlem, a church known for its occupation by the Young Lords in 1969. She ran on a hard leftist and socialist platform.

Rojas did not qualify for the mayoral debates due to her poor fundraising numbers, and led a protest where the debate was held.

Rojas was endorsed by Julia Salazar, a New York state senator, former City Council candidates Moumita Ahmed and Carolyn Tran, and Kristin Richardson Jordan, an activist and council member.

Rojas received 27,982 votes, or 2.49% in the election, which was easily won by Democrat Eric Adams. The vote total was the highest of any Socialist or left wing candidate, since 1953 and the highest percentage since 1949.

== Electoral record ==
Support for Rojas in the 2021 mayoral election by State Assembly district: <1% >1% >2% >3% >4% >5% >6% >8%

2021 New York City mayoral election
Party	Candidate	Votes	%	±%
Democratic	Eric Adams	753,801	66.99%	+0.82%
Republican	Curtis Sliwa	302,680	26.90%	+2.95%
Independent	Curtis Sliwa	9,705	0.86%	N/A
Total	Curtis Sliwa	312,385	27.76%	+0.17%
Socialism and Liberation	Cathy Rojas	27,982	2.49%	N/A
Conservative	Bill Pepitone	12,575	1.12%	−2.13%
Empowerment	Quanda S. Francis	3,792	0.34%	N/A
Libertarian	Stacey Prussman	3,189	0.28%	+0.04%
Humanity United	Raja Flores	2,387	0.21%	N/A
Save Our City	Fernando Mateo	1,870	0.17%	N/A
Out Lawbreaker	Skiboky Stora	264	0.02%	N/A
Write-in		7,013	0.62%	
Total votes		1,125,258	100.0%	
Democratic hold				
