= 2021 New York City mayoral election =

- November 2, 2021
- Registered: 4,911,262
- Turnout: 1,149,172; 23.39% (▼2.13 pp)
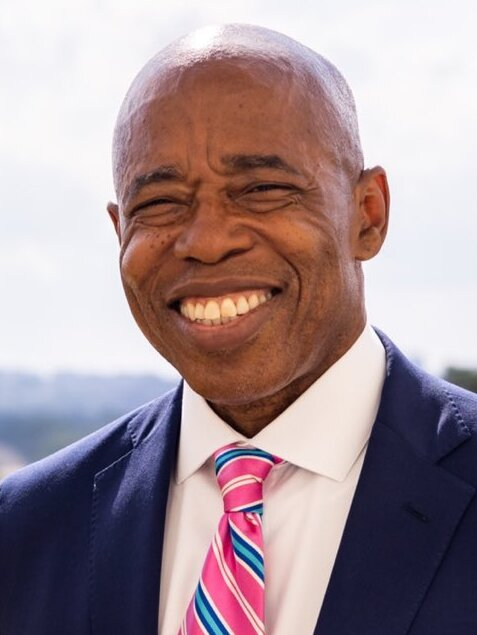

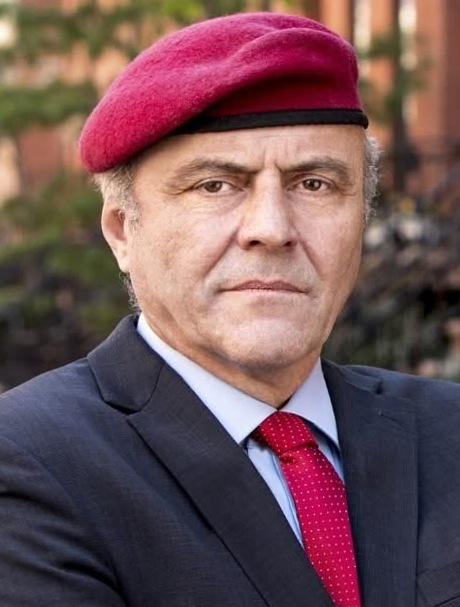
Nominee	Eric Adams	Curtis Sliwa
Party	Democratic	Republican
Popular vote	753,801	312,385
Percentage	66.99%	27.76%
- Adams: 40–50% 50–60% 60–70% 70–80% 80–90% >90% Sliwa: 40–50% 50–60% 60–70% 70–80% 80–90% >90% Tie: 40–50% 50% No data
Mayor before election
Bill de Blasio
Democratic
Elected Mayor
Eric Adams
Democratic

An election for the mayor of New York City was held on November 2, 2021. Incumbent mayor Bill de Blasio was term-limited and ineligible to run for re-election. Democratic Brooklyn Borough president and former police officer Eric Adams won the election in a landslide, defeating Republican candidate Curtis Sliwa. Adams became the city's second Black mayor.

Primary elections took place on June 22, 2021. Rather than the plurality voting of previous primaries, the elections were the first to use ranked-choice voting. Sliwa, founder of Guardian Angels, handily won the Republican primary over New York State Federation of Taxi Drivers founder Fernando Mateo. Polling showed businessman Andrew Yang as the frontrunner as of May 2021, but his lead later shrank as Adams emerged and eventually won in the final round of the Democratic primary over former New York City Department of Sanitation Commissioner Kathryn Garcia.

In the general election, Adams maintained a sizable lead over Sliwa and was heavily favored to win. On election day, Adams won easily, receiving 66.99% of the vote to Sliwa's 27.76%. He was sworn in on January 1, 2022.

== Background ==
In the 2017 mayoral election, lncumbent Bill de Blasio was re-elected mayor of New York City for a second term, defeating Republican nominee Nicole Malliotakis. New York City used proportional representation (single transferable voting) from 1937 to 1947. Such a system produced benefits to voters and elected a more diverse city council than had been produced under first-past-the-post voting before and after.

In 2019, New York City voters passed Ballot Question #1 to amend the City Charter to "give voters the choice of ranking up to five candidates in primary and special elections for mayor, public advocate, comptroller, borough president, and city council beginning in January 2021". The first election in the city to use ranked-choice voting (Instant-runoff voting) was in the 24th council district in Queens, which took place on February 2, 2021. This was the first time ranked-choice voting was used in the New York City mayoral election.

In 2019, journalists and political commentators predicted several potential 2021 mayoral candidates, including Brooklyn Borough President Eric Adams, Bronx Borough President Rubén Díaz Jr., NYC Council Speaker Corey Johnson, NYC Comptroller Scott Stringer, and NYC Public Advocate Jumaane Williams.

By May 2021, thirteen candidates had qualified for the Democratic Party primary, and two for the Republican Party primary. There are also minor party and independent campaigns for the general election in November.

== Democratic primary ==
Polling in late January and early February 2021 showed businessman Andrew Yang as the Democratic primary frontrunner, with Adams in second place and Stringer in third place.

In April, Scott Stringer was accused of sexual abuse by Jean Kim. Stringer denied the allegations, claiming that the relationship had been consensual. In June, a second woman accused him of sexual misconduct.

On May 5, 2021, Politico reported that a recent poll found that Eric Adams was leading the Democratic primary contest; this marked the first time since January that any Democratic candidate other than Yang had led in a public poll. On June 7, Spectrum News reported that Adams had maintained a lead in the Democratic primary.

On July 6, the Associated Press reported that Adams had won the Democratic primary. The Guardian stated that Adams, a "former police captain", had prevailed "after appealing to the political center and promising to strike the right balance between fighting crime and ending racial injustice in policing". An earlier report from The New York Times asserted that Adams had run as a "working-class underdog" and had "hammered away at the message that he was the only candidate who could tackle both crime and police reform".

=== Candidates ===
==== Nominee ====
Candidate	Experience	Announced	Ref
Eric Adams	Borough President, former NY State Senator from the 20th district (2007–2013), former NYPD captain	November 17, 2020)	

==== Eliminated in primary ====
- Art Chang, former JPMorgan Chase managing director, founder of NYC Votes
- Shaun Donovan, former Director of the US Office of Management and Budget (2014–2017), United States Secretary of Housing and Urban Development (2009–2014), former Commissioner of the NYC Department of Housing Preservation and Development (2004–2008)
- Aaron Foldenauer, attorney
- Kathryn Garcia, former Commissioner of the NYC Department of Sanitation (2014–2020), former Interim Chair and CEO of the NYC Housing Authority (2019), former Chief Operating Officer of the NYC Department of Environmental Protection (2012–2014)
- Ray McGuire, former Citigroup executive
- Dianne Morales, former social services non-profit CEO, former schoolteacher
- Paperboy Love Prince, Brooklyn rapper
- Scott Stringer, New York City Comptroller, former Manhattan Borough President (2006–2013), former assemblymember for the 67th district (1993–2005)
- Joycelyn Taylor, CEO of TaylorMade Contracting
- Maya Wiley, The New School professor, former chair of the New York City Civilian Complaint Review Board (2016–2017), former counsel to Bill de Blasio, former ACLU and NAACP Legal Defense Fund attorney
- Isaac Wright Jr., lawyer
- Andrew Yang, candidate for President of the United States in 2020, former Presidential Ambassador for Global Entrepreneurship (2015–2017), founder of Venture for America

==== Write-in candidates who did not qualify for ballot access ====
- Nickie Kane, web designer, entrepreneur and paralegal student at City University of New York
- Eddie Cullen, tech entrepreneur and professor at Purdue University
- Thomas Downs, restaurant worker
- Guiddalia Emilien, real estate agent and small business owner
- Garry Guerrier, paramedic and nurse
- Max Kaplan, director of social media at Talent Resources
- Barbara Kavovit, CEO of Evergreen Construction and former Real Housewives of New York City cast member
- Ira Seidman, data scientist
- Ahsan Syed, candidate for NYC Mayor in 2017

==== Withdrawn ====
- Michael DeName, former independent US presidential candidate
- Rubén Díaz Jr., Bronx Borough President (2009–2021), former NY State Assemblymember (1997–2009) (endorsed Eric Adams)
- Quanda S. Francis, president of Sykes Capital Management (withdrew to run as an independent)
- Zach Iscol, entrepreneur, United States Marine Corps veteran (running for NYC Comptroller; lost election)
- Corey Johnson, Speaker of the NYC Council (2018–present), NYC Councilmember for the 3rd district (2014–present) (running for NYC Comptroller)
- Carlos Menchaca, NYC Councilmember for Brooklyn's 38th district (2013–present) (endorsed Andrew Yang)
- Julia Qing Reaves, LGBT+ activist
- Stephen Bishop Seely, actor
- Loree Sutton, former Commissioner of the NYC Department of Veterans' Services (2017–2019), former US Army brigadier general (endorsed Kathryn Garcia)

==== Declined ====
- Andy Byford, former president of the NYC Transit Authority (2018–2020)
- Melinda Katz, Queens County District Attorney (2020–present), Queens Borough President (2014–2020), NYC Councilmember for the 29th district (2002–2009), NY State Assemblymember for the 28th district (1994–1999)
- Melissa Mark-Viverito, former NYC Council Speaker (2014–2017)
- Alexandria Ocasio-Cortez, US Representative for New York's 14th congressional district (2019–present) (endorsed Maya Wiley)
- Christine Quinn, former NYC Council Speaker (2006–2013)
- Max Rose, former US Representative for New York's 11th congressional district (2019–2021) (formed exploratory committee but did not run)
- Ritchie Torres, US Representative for New York's 15th congressional district (2021–present) (endorsed Andrew Yang)
- Jumaane Williams, NYC Public Advocate (2019–present), former NYC Councilmember for the 45th district (2010–2019) (running for re-election as NYC Public Advocate) (endorsed Maya Wiley)
- Jeff Zucker, chairman of Warner Media News & Sports (2019–present)

=== Results by round ===
2021 New York City mayoral Democratic primary election
Candidate	Round 1		Round 2		Round 3		Round 4		Round 5		Round 6		Round 7		Round 8	
Candidate	Votes	%	Votes	%	Votes	%	Votes	%	Votes	%	Votes	%	Votes	%	Votes	%
Eric Adams	289,403	30.7%	289,603	30.8%	290,055	30.8%	291,806	31.2%	295,798	31.7%	317,092	34.6%	354,657	40.5%	404,513	50.4%
Kathryn Garcia	184,463	19.6%	184,571	19.6%	184,669	19.6%	186,731	19.9%	191,876	20.5%	223,634	24.4%	266,932	30.5%	397,316	49.6%
Maya Wiley	201,127	21.4%	201,193	21.4%	201,518	21.4%	206,013	22.0%	209,108	22.4%	239,174	26.1%	254,728	29.1%	Eliminated	
Andrew Yang	115,130	12.2%	115,301	12.2%	115,502	12.3%	118,808	12.6%	121,597	13.0%	135,686	14.8%	Eliminated			
Scott Stringer	51,778	5.5%	51,850	5.5%	51,951	5.5%	53,599	5.7%	56,723	6.1%	Eliminated					
Dianne Morales	26,495	2.8%	26,534	2.8%	26,645	2.8%	30,157	3.2%	30,933	3.3%	Eliminated					
Raymond McGuire	25,242	2.7%	25,272	2.7%	25,418	2.7%	26,361	2.8%	27,934	3.0%	Eliminated					
Shaun Donovan	23,167	2.5%	23,189	2.5%	23,314	2.5%	24,042	2.6%	Eliminated							
Aaron Foldenauer	7,742	0.8%	7,758	0.8%	7,819	0.8%	Eliminated									
Art Chang	7,048	0.7%	7,064	0.8%	7,093	0.8%	Eliminated									
Paperboy Prince	3,964	0.4%	4,007	0.4%	4,060	0.4%	Eliminated									
Joycelyn Taylor	2,662	0.3%	2,683	0.3%	2,780	0.3%	Eliminated									
Isaac Wright Jr.	2,242	0.2%	2,254	0.2%	Eliminated											
Write-ins	1,568	0.2%	Eliminated													
Inactive ballots	0 ballots		752 ballots		1,207 ballots		5,314 ballots		8,062 ballots		26,445 ballots		65,714 ballots		140,202 ballots	

== Republican primary ==
2021 New York City Republican mayoral primary
- June 22, 2021
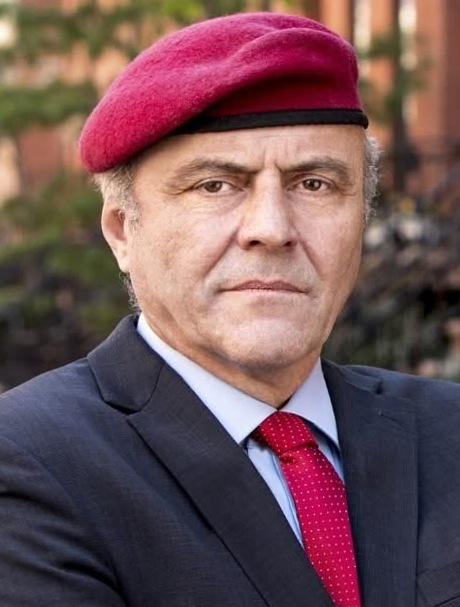

Candidate	Curtis Sliwa	Fernando Mateo
First round	40,794	16,719
Percentage	67.9%	27.8%
- First round results Sliwa: 40–50% 50–60% 60–70% 70–80% 80–90% Mateo: 50–60%
Previous Republican nominee
Nicole Malliotakis
Republican nominee
Curtis Sliwa

=== Candidates ===
==== Major candidates ====
Two candidates appeared on the Republican primary ballot.

Republican primary candidates
Candidate	Experience	Announced	Ref
Fernando Mateo	Founder of the New York State Federation of Taxi Drivers	February 4, 2021 (Website)	
Curtis Sliwa	Founder of the Guardian Angels Radio talk show host	March 8, 2020 (Website Archived April 22, 2021, at the Wayback Machine)	

Sliwa ran on a platform opposing the Defund the Police movement, supporting a property tax overhaul so that wealthy citizens pay more in comparison to working-class residents, keeping in place the Specialized High School Admissions Test while increasing opportunities for vocational training in charter schools, and focusing on fiscal restraint. He also opposes the killing of unwanted animals and supports making all animal shelters no-kill shelters.

==== Failed to qualify for ballot access ====
- Abbey Laurel-Smith, businesswoman
- Adam Oremland, attorney and social media personality
- Bill Pepitone, retired NYPD officer (ran as the candidate for the Conservative Party)
- Sara Tirschwell, CFO of Foundation House

==== Withdrawn ====
- Cleopatra Fitzgerald, activist
- Christopher Scott Krietchman, entrepreneur

==== Declined ====
- Nicole Gelinas, fellow at the Manhattan Institute
- Andrew Giuliani, son of Rudy Giuliani, former special assistant to the president, former associate director of the White House Office of Public Engagement (ran for governor in 2022)
- Randy Levine, president of the New York Yankees
- Kelly Kennedy Mack, president of Corcoran Sunshine Marketing Group
- Scherie Murray, businessperson, candidate for NY State Assembly in 2015, candidate for NY District 14
- David B. Samadi, urologist
- Eric Ulrich, NYC Councilmember (2009–present)

=== Endorsements ===
Curtis Sliwa

US Representatives

- Nicole Malliotakis, US Representative from New York's 11th congressional district (2021–present), former NY State Assemblymember for the 64th district (2013–2020) and the 60th district (2011–2012), and nominee for mayor in 2017

State legislators

- Michael Tannousis, NY State Assemblymember for the 64th district (2021–present)

Local officials

- Joe Borelli, NYC Councilmember (2015–present)
- Steven Matteo, NYC Councilmember (2014–present)

Individuals

- John Catsimatidis, businessman and radio talk show host
- Rudy Giuliani, former mayor of New York City (1994–2001), former US Attorney for the Southern District of New York (1983–1989), former US Associate Attorney General (1981–1983)
- Peter T. King, US Representative from New York's 2nd congressional district (2013–2021) and US Representative from New York's 3rd congressional district (1993–2013)
- Geraldo Rivera, journalist and political commentator

Organizations

- New York Young Republican Club
- Brooklyn Republican Party
- Staten Island Republican Party
Fernando Mateo

Individuals

- Michael Flynn, former US National Security Advisor (2017)

Organizations

- Manhattan Republican Party
- Queens Republican Party
- Bronx Republican Party

=== Opinion polling ===
Poll source	Date(s) administered	Sample size (Note: Key: A – all adults RV – registered voters LV – likely voters V – unclear)	Margin of error	Fernando Mateo	Curtis Sliwa	Undecided
Emerson College (Note: Poll sponsored by WPIX and NewsNation)	Jun 7–8, 2021	250 (LV)	± 6.2%	27%	33%	40%

=== Debates ===
2021 New York City mayoral election Republican primary debates
No.	Date	Host	Moderator	Link	Participants	
Key: P Participant A Absent N Non-invitee I Invitee W Withdrawn						
Key: P Participant A Absent N Non-invitee I Invitee W Withdrawn					Curtis Sliwa	Fernando Mateo
1	March 31, 2021	WABC	Dominic Carter	Video	P	P
2	June 3, 2021	PIX11	Ayana Harry; Dan Mannarino; Henry Rossoff	Video	P	P

=== Results ===
2021 New York mayoral Republican primary election
Party	Candidate	Votes	%
Republican	Curtis Sliwa	40,794	67.9
Republican	Fernando Mateo	16,719	27.8
Write-in		2,536	4.2
Total votes		60,049	100%

== Third parties ==
=== Conservative Party ===
==== Nominee ====
- Bill Pepitone, retired NYPD officer

=== Working Families Party ===
==== Candidate ====
- No candidate nominated

==== Declined ====
- Deborah Axt, former director of Make the Road New York
- Maya Wiley, The New School professor

=== Empowerment Party ===
==== Nominee ====
- Quanda S. Francis, Sykes Capital Management President and Accountant

=== Libertarian Party ===
==== Nominee ====
- Stacey Prussman, activist and comedian

=== Party for Socialism and Liberation ===
==== Candidate ====
- Cathy Rojas, teacher and socialist activist

=== Independents ===
==== Declared ====
- Thomas Downs, activist
- Quanda Francis, president of Sykes Capital Management
- Christopher Scott Krietchman

== General election ==
=== Debates ===
2021 New York City mayoral election general election debate
No.	Date	Host	Moderator	Link	Participants	
Key: P Participant A Absent N Non-invitee I Invitee W Withdrawn						
Key: P Participant A Absent N Non-invitee I Invitee W Withdrawn					Eric Adams	Curtis Sliwa
1	October 20, 2021	Citizens Budget Commission; NBC 4 New York; New York City Campaign Finance Board; New York Urban League; Politico; Telemundo 47	Sally Goldenberg; Melissa Russo; David Ushery; Allan Villafaña		P	P
2	October 26, 2021	ABC 7 Hispanic Federation; League of Women Voters; NAACP NYS Conference; Univision 41	Dave Evans; Bill Ritter; Mariela Salgado		P	P

=== Endorsements ===
Eric Adams (D)

U.S. Senators

- Chuck Schumer, Senate Majority Leader (2021–2025) and US Senator from New York (1999–present)

U.S. Representatives

- Adriano Espaillat, US Representative from New York's 13th congressional district (2017–present)
- Sean Patrick Maloney, US Representative from New York's 18th congressional district (2013–2023), Chair of the House of Representatives Democratic Congressional Campaign Committee (2021–2023)
- Grace Meng, US Representative from New York's 6th congressional district (2013–present)
- Jerry Nadler, US Representative from New York's 10th congressional district (2013–2023), Chair of the House Judiciary Committee (2019–2023)
- Thomas Suozzi, US Representative from New York's 3rd congressional district (2017–2023), County Executive of Nassau County (2002–2009)

State officials

- Kathy Hochul, Governor of New York (2021–present)

State legislators

- Peter J. Abbate Jr., NY State Assemblymember for the 49th district (1987–present)
- Joseph Addabbo Jr., NY State Senator for the 15th district (2009–present)
- Stacey Pheffer Amato, NY State Assemblymember for the 23rd district (2017–present)
- Jamaal Bailey, NY State Senator for the 36th district (2017–present), Chair of the Bronx County Democratic Committee (2020–present)
- Carmen De La Rosa, NY State Assemblymember for the 72nd district (2017–present)
- Inez Dickens, NY State Assemblymember for the 70th district (2017–present)
- Erik Dilan, NY State Assemblymember for the 54th district (2015–present)
- Charles Fall, NY State Assemblymember for the 61st district (2019–present)
- Andrew Gounardes, NY State Senator for the 22nd district (2019–present)
- Rodneyse Bichotte Hermelyn, NY State Assemblymember for the 42nd district (2015–present), Chair of the Kings County Democratic Committee (2020–present)
- Alicia Hyndman, NY State Assemblymember for the 29th district (2016–present)
- Roxanne Persaud, NY State Senator for the 19th district (2015–present)
- Jenifer Rajkumar, NY State Assemblymember for the 38th district (2021–present)
- José Rivera, NY State Assemblymember for the 78th district (2001–present)
- James Sanders Jr., NY State Senator for the 10th district (2013–present)
- Diane Savino, NY State Senator for the 23rd district (2005–present)
- Clyde Vanel, NY State Assemblymember for the 33rd district (2017–present)
- Jaime Williams, NY State Assemblymember for the 59th district (2016–present)

Local officials

- Adrienne Adams, NYC Councilmember (2017–present)
- Alicka Ampry-Samuel, NYC Councilmember (2018–present)
- Diana Ayala, NYC Councilmember (2018–present)
- Justin Brannan, NYC Councilmember (2018–present)
- Selvena Brooks-Powers, NYC Councilmember (2021–present)
- Laurie Cumbo, NYC Councilmember (2014–present)
- Darma Diaz, NYC Councilmember (2021–present)
- Bill de Blasio, Mayor of New York City (2014–2021)
- Rubén Díaz Jr., Borough President of The Bronx (2009–present), former NY State Assemblymember for the 85th district (2003–2009) & 75th district (1997–2002)
- Oswald Feliz, NYC Councilmember (2021–present)
- Corey Johnson, Speaker of the NYC Council (2018–2021), NYC Councilmember (2014–2021)
- Peter Koo, NYC Councilmember (2010–present)
- Karen Koslowitz, NYC Councilmember (2010–present)
- Farah Louis, NYC Councilmember (2019–present)
- Alan Maisel, NYC Councilmember (2014–present)
- Daneek Miller, NYC Councilmember (2014–present)
- Francisco Moya, NYC Councilmember (2018–present)
- Donovan Richards, Borough President of Queens (2020–present), NYC Councilmember (2014–2020)
- Kevin Riley, NYC Councilmember (2021–present)
- Ydanis Rodríguez, NYC Councilmember (2010–present)
- Debi Rose, NYC Councilmember (2010–present)
- Rafael Salamanca, NYC Councilmember (2016–present)
- Eric Ulrich, NYC Councilmember (2016–present) (Republican)

Individuals

- Ottis Anderson, former professional football player for the New York Giants and Super Bowl XXV MVP
- Michael Bloomberg, Mayor of New York City (2002-2013)
- Karim Camara, former NY State Assemblymember for the 43rd district (2005–2015)
- Andrew Cuomo, former Governor of New York (2011-2021)
- Fernando Ferrer, Vice Chairman of the Metropolitan Transportation Authority, 2005 Democratic nominee for Mayor, former Borough President of The Bronx (1987–2001)
- Kathryn Garcia, Commissioner of the New York City Sanitation Department, 2021 Democratic candidate for Mayor
- Taj Gibson, professional basketball player
- Dwight Gooden, former professional baseball all-star player for the New York Mets
- Aurelia Greene, former NY State Assemblymember for the 77th district (1982–2009)
- Larry Holmes, former professional boxer
- Ed Kranepool, former professional baseball all-star player for the New York Mets
- Bertha Lewis, activist
- Abner Louima, activist and victim of police violence in 1997 by NYPD
- Bill Maher, comedian, actor, political commentator, and television host
- Carl McCall, former NY State Comptroller (1993–2002), former NY State Senator for the 28th district (1975–1980)
- David Paterson, 55th Governor of New York (2008–2010), former Lieutenant Governor of New York (2007–2008), former State Senator (1985–2006)
- Charles Rangel, former US Representative from New York's 13th congressional district (1971–2017)
- Bret Stephens, conservative journalist, editor, and columnist
- Norman Siegel, attorney and former executive director of the New York Civil Liberties Union
- Aaron Teitelbaum, one of two Grand Rebbes of Satmar
- Edolphus Towns, former US Representative from New York's 10th congressional district (1983–2013)
- Keith L. T. Wright, Chair of the New York Democratic Committee (2009–present), former Chair of the New York State Democratic Committee (2012–2014), former NY State Assemblymember for the 70th district (1993–2016)
- Andrew Yang, Presidential Ambassador for Global Entrepreneurship (2015–2017), entrepreneur and candidate for Mayor of New York City in 2021 (Formerly Democratic, Independent and Forward Party since 2021)
- Angela Yee, radio personality

Organizations

- Citizens Union
- Stonewall Democratic Club of New York
- Vulcan Society

Labor unions

- Amalgamated Transit Union Local 726-Staten Island, Local 1056-Flushing, Local 1179-Queens, Local 1181
- Civil Service Employees Association Local 1000
- District Council 37
- Council of Hotel Workers and Trades Professionals
- New York City District Council of Carpenters
- New York State Court Officers Association
- New York State Nurses Association
- Office and Professional Employees International Union Local 153
- Public Employees Federation
- Service Employees International Union Local 32BJ
- Transport Workers Union Local 100
- Uniformed Fire Officers Association
- UNITE HERE Local 100

Newspapers

- El Especialito
- The Irish Echo
- The Jewish Press
- Jewish Voice
- New York Post
- Our Time Press
- Queens Chronicle
Cathy Rojas (PSL)

State legislators

- Julia Salazar, NY State Senator for the 18th district (2019-present) (Democrat)

Individuals

- Kristin Richardson Jordan, poet and activist; Democratic nominee for New York City's 9th City Council district in 2021 (Democrat)
Curtis Sliwa (R)

U.S. Representatives

- Nicole Malliotakis, US Representative from New York's 11th congressional district (2021–present), former NY State Assemblymember for the 64th district (2013–2020) and the 60th district (2011–2012), and nominee for mayor in 2017

State legislators

- Michael Tannousis, NY State Assemblymember for the 64th district (2021–present)

Local officials

- Joe Borelli, NYC Councilmember (2015–2025)
- Steven Matteo, NYC Councilmember (2014–2021)

Individuals

- John Catsimatidis, businessman and radio talk show host
- Vito Fossella, US Representative from New York's 13th congressional district (1997-2009), NYC Councilmember (1994-1997)
- Rudy Giuliani, former mayor of New York City (1994–2001), former US Attorney for the Southern District of New York (1983–1989), former US Associate Attorney General (1981–1983)
- Peter T. King, US Representative from New York's 2nd congressional district (2013–2021) and US Representative from New York's 3rd congressional district (1993–2013)

Organizations

- New York Young Republican Club

=== Polling ===
Poll source	Date(s) administered	Sample size	Margin of error	Eric Adams (D)	Curtis Sliwa (R)	Undecided
Emerson College	October 22–23, 2021	615 (LV)	± 3.9%	61%	25%	14%

=== Results ===
Results by precinct, overlaid with neighborhoods: Adams: 40–50% 50–60% 60–70% 70–80% 80–90% >90% / Sliwa: 40–50% 50–60% 60–70% 70–80% 80–90% >90% / Tie No votes

Support for Party for Socialism and Liberation candidate Cathy Rojas by State Assembly district: <1% >1% >2% >3% >4% >5% >6% >8%

Though Adams won the election easily in the heavily Democratic city, he received fewer votes than Bill de Blasio in either of his two mayoral runs, and lost many heavily Asian American precincts. This is partly attributed to Sliwa's pledge to halt the construction of homeless shelters which were proposed by Adams to be built in neighborhoods such as Asian-majority Sunset Park. Other issues of importance to Asian American activist leaders included proposed reforms to the Specialized High Schools Admissions Test in high schools, bail reform, and plans to build new jails in neighborhoods such as Chinatown, Manhattan.

General election results
Party	Candidate	Votes	%	±%
Democratic	Eric Adams	753,801	66.99%	+0.82%
Republican	Curtis Sliwa	302,680	26.90%	+2.95%
Independent	Curtis Sliwa	9,705	0.86%	N/A
Total	Curtis Sliwa	312,385	27.76%	+0.17%
Socialism and Liberation	Cathy Rojas	27,982	2.49%	N/A
Conservative	Bill Pepitone	12,575	1.12%	−2.13%
Empowerment	Quanda S. Francis	3,792	0.34%	N/A
Libertarian	Stacey Prussman	3,189	0.28%	+0.04%
Humanity United	Raja Flores	2,387	0.21%	N/A
Save Our City	Fernando Mateo	1,870	0.17%	N/A
Out Lawbreaker	Skiboky Stora	264	0.02%	N/A
Write-in		7,013	0.62%	+0.15%
Total votes		1,125,258	100.0%	
Democratic hold				

==== By borough ====
Adams won four boroughs out of five, mirroring the Democratic performances in 2013 and 2017 to win Brooklyn, Queens, Manhattan and Bronx while losing Staten Island. He performed the best in Manhattan, crossing 80% of the vote, and earned more than 70% of the vote in Brooklyn and the Bronx. In contrast, Sliwa performed more strongly in Queens, with slightly more than a third of the vote, and handily defeated Adams in Staten Island, the city's only borough to back Trump in 2020. Manhattan and Staten Island were the only boroughs that swung left from 2017.

Candidate
Candidate	Brooklyn		Queens		Manhattan		Staten Island		Bronx	
Candidate	Votes	%	Votes	%	Votes	%	Votes	%	Votes	%
Eric Adams	239,999	70.76%	168,451	59.79%	219,045	80.36%	30,226	28.69%	96,080	76.01%
Curtis Sliwa	77,763	22.93%	100,187	35.56%	36,668	13.45%	69,924	66.38%	25,843	20.45%
others	21,429	6.32%	13,112	4.65%	16,781	6.16%	5,194	4.93%	4,476	3.54%
Total counted votes	339,191	100.00%	281,750	100.00%	272,584	100.00%	105,344	100.00%	126,399	100.00%

==== By congressional district ====

Adams won in 11 districts out of 13, securing more than 80% of the vote in the 13th, 15th and 16th districts in the city's northwest. He also crossed the 70% threshold in six more districts, but underperformed significantly in the Asian-plorality 6th district, where he only beat Sliwa out by 60 votes. Conversely, Sliwa won the 11th district, the city's only one to back Trump in 2020 and the only one to be represented by a Republican; additionally, he outran Adams in the portion of the 3rd district.

District	Adams	Sliwa	Representative
3rd (part)	43.1%	53.4%	Tom Suozzi
5th	78.3%	19.1%	Gregory Meeks
6th	47.8%	47.7%	Grace Meng
7th	73.0%	18.9%	Nydia Velázquez
8th	74.1%	20.7%	Hakeem Jeffries
9th	77.0%	66.9%	Yvette Clarke
10th	73.4%	21.0%	Jerry Nadler
11th	31.5%	61.5%	Nicole Malliotakis
12th	75.8%	18.2%	Carolyn Maloney
13th	82.8%	11.6%	Adriano Espaillat
14th	59.2%	34.6%	Alexandria Ocasio-Cortez
15th	82.9%	14.0%	Ritchie Torres
16th (part)	81.5%	15.2%	Jamaal Bowman

== See also ==
- 2021 New York City Public Advocate election
- 2021 New York City Comptroller election
- 2021 New York City Council election
- 2021 New York City borough president elections
- List of mayors of New York City

== Notes ==
Partisan clients
