= Kathryn Garcia =

American government official (born 1970)

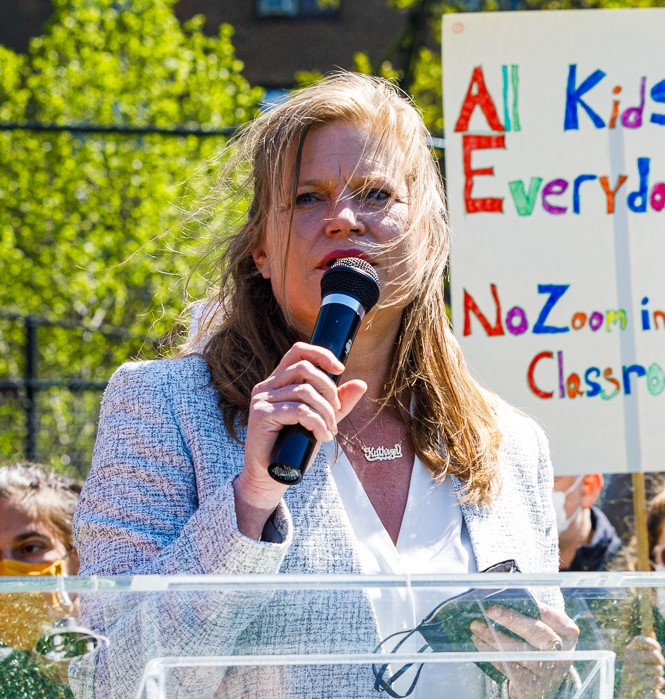
- Garcia in 2021

Executive Director of the Port Authority of New York and New Jersey
- Incumbent
- Assumed office February 9, 2026
- Governor: Kathy Hochul; Mikie Sherrill
- Preceded by: Rick Cotton

Director of Operations of New York
- In office September 1, 2021 – February 8, 2026
- Governor: Kathy Hochul
- Preceded by: Kelly Cummings
- Succeeded by: Jackie Bray

39th Commissioner of the New York City Sanitation Department
- In office April 1, 2014 – September 18, 2020
- Mayor: Bill de Blasio
- Preceded by: John Doherty
- Succeeded by: Edward Grayson

Personal details
- Born: Kathryn A. McIver; March 3, 1970 (age 56) New York City, U.S.
- Party: Democratic
- Spouse: Jerry Garcia (divorced)
- Children: 2
- Education: University of Wisconsin–Madison (BA)

Kathryn A. Garcia (née McIver; born March 3, 1970) is an American public official serving as the executive director of the Port Authority of New York and New Jersey. She previously served as director of state operations for the state of New York from 2021 to 2026, and as commissioner for the New York City Sanitation Department from 2014 to 2020. She was a candidate in the 2021 New York City Democratic mayoral primary, losing by 0.8 percentage points to Eric Adams.

Garcia also previously served as interim chair and CEO of the New York City Housing Authority and was appointed "food czar" for New York's emergency food program during the COVID-19 emergency response.

== Early life and education ==
Kathryn Garcia was born in Brooklyn and adopted as an infant by Bruce C. and Ann McIver. She was raised in Park Slope, along with five multiracial adopted siblings. Her father was the chief labor negotiator for former New York City Mayor Ed Koch, and her mother was a Medgar Evers College English professor and executive director of a nonprofit. Actor Clark Gregg is her cousin.

Garcia completed her primary education at P.S. 321 in Park Slope and graduated from Stuyvesant High School in Manhattan. She earned a Bachelor of Arts degree in economics and history from the University of Wisconsin–Madison.

== Career ==
Garcia started her career as an intern at the New York City Department of Sanitation, and then worked as a policy analyst at the New York City Department of Finance and as vice president at Appleseed, focusing on strategic planning and economic impact studies. She later served in several roles at the New York City Department of Environmental Protection during the Bloomberg administration, including as COO. There, she was responsible for the operation of the city's water supply, water and sewer system, and wastewater treatment plants. She implemented efficiency measures that led to $30 million reduction in the agency's expenses, and helped restore 42 pumping stations and a wastewater treatment plant that was affected by Hurricane Sandy.

=== Commissioner of sanitation ===
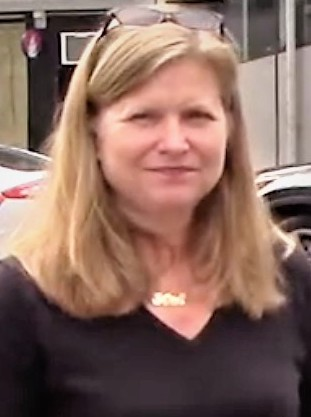
Garcia as DSNY Commissioner, 2017

Mayor Bill de Blasio appointed Garcia as the commissioner for the New York City Department of Sanitation on March 31, 2014. She was the second woman to serve in that role. As commissioner, Garcia oversaw garbage collection, recycling collection, street cleaning, and snow removal. She pursued an ambitious zero waste to landfills agenda, and built the nation's largest residential curbside food scraps collection and composting program. She also established a commercial franchise zoning system, an overhaul of commercial garbage pickup intended to make the industry safer for pedestrians, workers and the environment. In 2018 she oversaw the controversial removal of 1,131 trash cans from NYC streets.

During her tenure, Garcia also oversaw the construction of marine transfer stations, negotiated major disposal contracts, supported the passage of waste equity legislation, made internal systems paperless, launched a procurement program to support businesses owned by people of color and women, and started the NYC Food Waste Fair.

=== Interim chair of NYCHA ===
Following widespread controversy and criticism after the New York City Housing Authority (NYCHA) admitted to falsely saying it had performed mandated inspections for lead paint that had not been done for years, de Blasio named Garcia senior advisor for citywide lead prevention in October 2018. In that role, she coordinated citywide efforts to reduce childhood lead exposure, and produced LeadFreeNYC, a comprehensive plan to eradicate childhood lead exposure at NYCHA and in private homes.

In February 2019, Garcia was appointed as CEO and interim chair of NYCHA. In that role, she focused on further improving lead paint compliance, safety, and quality assurance, as well as long-term financial stability.

=== COVID-19 food czar ===
On March 22, 2020, Garcia was named "food czar" for New York's COVID-19 emergency response, and tasked with ensuring that every New Yorker in need has access to food and securing the city's food supply. In her first month as food czar, she coordinated a massive effort to distribute free meals at more than 400 schools, and a home delivery program that hired 11,000 taxi drivers to provide 120,000 to 140,000 meals per day to seniors, COVID-vulnerable, and homebound New Yorkers. The program cost the city $170 million and distributed 130 million meals during Garcia's tenure.

=== 2021 mayoral candidacy ===
On September 18, 2020, Garcia resigned from her roles as sanitation commissioner, interim NYCHA chair, and food czar due to the budget cuts to the Department of Sanitation and her intention to explore a run for New York City mayor.

In May 2021, The New York Times and The New York Daily News endorsed Garcia. Garcia finished in second place narrowly behind Eric Adams.

=== Director of New York state operations ===
On September 1, 2021, Governor Kathy Hochul appointed Garcia to become director of state operations, succeeding Kelly Cummings. Hochul highlighted Garcia's work as the commissioner of the New York City Department of Sanitation, as CEO and interim chair of NYCHA, and as New York City's food czar.

Following Zohran Mamdani's election as mayor of New York City in 2025, The New York Times reported that Garcia was among a group of policy experts he consulted for advice; Garcia had attended Mamdani's victory party on election night.

=== Port Authority of New York and New Jersey ===
On December 9, 2025, Governor Kathy Hochul appointed Garcia to become the Executive Director of the Port Authority of New York and New Jersey. She took office February 9, 2026.

== Personal life ==
Garcia was married to Jerry Garcia, a banker of Puerto Rican descent, until their divorce in 2016. She has two children. Since 2014, Garcia has resided in Park Slope.
