= New York City Department of Sanitation =

New York City government agency

Department of Sanitation
- Patch

- Flag

Department overview
- Formed: December 20, 1881; 144 years ago
- Jurisdiction: New York City
- Headquarters: 125 Worth Street New York, NY
- Motto: New York's Strongest
- Employees: 7,957 uniformed sanitation workers and supervisors 1,661 civilian employees
- Annual budget: $2.01 billion (FY 2026)
- Department executive: Gregory Anderson, Commissioner; Anthony Pennolino, Chief of Department
- Key document: New York City Charter
- Website: www.nyc.gov/sanitation

The New York City Department of Sanitation (DSNY) is the department of the government of New York City responsible for garbage collection, recycling collection, street cleaning, and snow removal. The DSNY is the primary operator of the New York City waste management system.

The department's motto, "New York's Strongest", was coined by Harry Nespoli, long-time President of the International Brotherhood of Teamsters Local 831, to describe the Department of Sanitation's football team in the late 1970s to early 1980s. The section of Worth Street between Centre and Baxter Streets in Manhattan is named "Avenue of the Strongest" in their honor.

== History ==
Prior to 1881, a Street Cleaning Bureau functioned under the New York City Police Department. However, streets were filthy, filled with mud, rubbish, ash, and horse urine and manure. On May 29, 1881, all the bureau's books and papers were transferred from the police headquarters in anticipation of the passage of a law creating a new administrative structure and the separate Department of Street Cleaning. On May 30, the bill enacting the Department of Street Cleaning was signed by Governor of New York Alonzo B. Cornell. However, Henry H. Gorringe, who had been asked to serve as the inaugural commissioner by Mayor William R. Grace, had been hoping for a different bill and declined the position, stating that it was a "delusion and snare from beginning to end", and that he would have had to answer to "five different areas of city government – the Mayoralty, the Board of Estimate and Apportionment, the Board of Health, the Police Board, and the Department of Street Cleaning," with the latter having the least effective power. Instead, several days later, James S. Coleman became the first commissioner, and held the position for eight years.

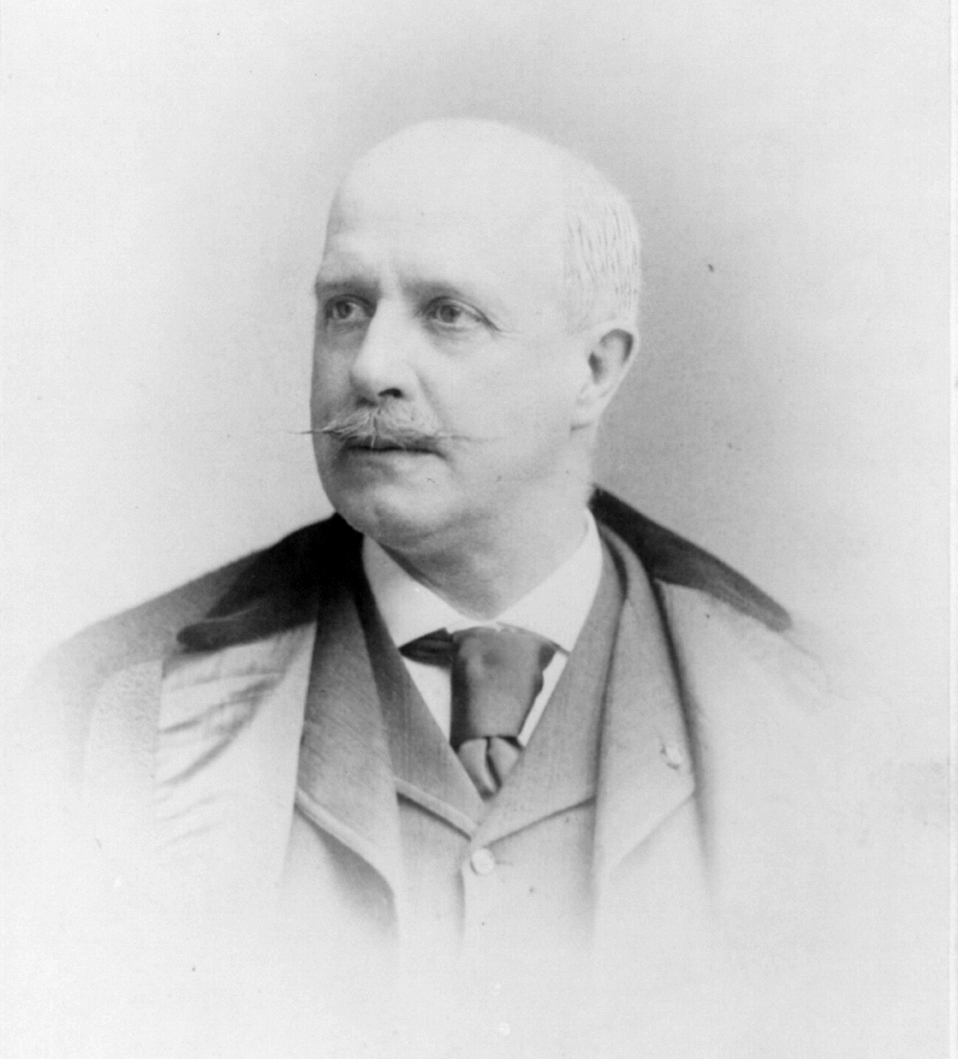
George E. Waring

In 1894, Col. George E. Waring, Jr. became commissioner, and he was credited with substantially cleaning the streets, as well as pioneering recycling, street sweeping, and the establishment of a uniformed cleaning and collection force. The department's name was changed to the Department of Sanitation in 1929.

- 1980: New York City won the right to staff sanitation trucks with a crew of two, instead of three.
- 1986: New York City hired two female sanitation workers. Initially they did only street-sweeping. Going with sanitation trucks began the following year.
- 2003: Mayor Michael Bloomberg laid off 515 sanitation workers while seeking to "increase the length of runs by sanitation trucks – more trash per truck would lower costs"
- 2009: New York City introduced use of hybrid-electric sanitation-pickup vehicles. Like those then in use, staff crew were numbered at two, not three as had been the case until 1980.

In 2015, the department had more than 9,700 employees, handled more than 3.2 million tons of refuse every year, and recycled more than 600,000 tons of waste material annually. Sanitation Commissioner Kathryn Garcia resigned in September 2020 to consider running for mayor of New York City, and criticized what she termed the "unconscionable" $100 million budget cuts of Mayor Bill DiBlasio in her resignation letter. Those budget cuts, among other things, forced a 60% reduction in pickups from public trash baskets.

=== Strikes ===
- 1968: Sanitation workers had been without a contract for six months when they rejected Mayor John Lindsay's proposal and went on strike on February 2. 7,000 sanitation workers marched to City Hall Park to demand higher pay and increased benefits. President John DeLury of the Uniformed Sanitationmen's Association is quoted saying, "No contract, no work!" to the crowd. Mayor Lindsay referred to the strike as illegal, because it was in violation of the Taylor Law, which passed that previous year. As the garbage on the streets of New York City accumulated to over 100,000 tons, negotiations between Lindsay and union leaders went poorly. Finally, on February 10, New York Governor Nelson Rockefeller stepped in, offering a $425 wage increase, double-time pay for working on Sundays, and a 2.5 percent increase in pension funds, which the workers agreed to and ended the strike.
- 1975: A wildcat strike took place in 1975 from July 2 to 4 in the midst of a budget crisis for New York City before workers returned to work under the provision that they would put up their own money to guarantee payroll if the city legislation could not get the tax increase necessary.
- 1981: Workers went on strike just after midnight on December 1 to demand a wage increase and remained out until December 17.

=== Role in 9/11 rescue and recovery efforts ===
After the September 11 terrorist attacks on the World Trade Center, approximately 3,700 sanitation employees were involved in clean-up, debris removal and processing at ground zero and the Fresh Kills landfill, as well as other sites in the city. Fifteen hundred employees were deployed in the first 24 hours, as well as over 150 pieces of heavy machinery. They worked at ground zero for 39 weeks and processed up to 17,500 tons of material a day at the Fresh Kills landfill. This, in coordination with other departments and agencies, allowed for the identification of over 300 victims.

To commemorate the 20th anniversary of 9/11, the Sanitation Foundation launched an online exhibition detailing "the incredible—and largely unknown—story of the vital role that the New York City Department of Sanitation (DSNY) played in the rescue and recovery efforts following the terrorist attacks of September 11, 2001".

== Organization ==
The New York City Department of Sanitation is the largest sanitation department in the world, with 7,201 uniformed sanitation workers and supervisors, 2,041 civilian workers, 2,230 general collection trucks, 275 specialized collection trucks, 450 street sweepers, 365 snowplows, 298 front end loaders, and 2,360 support vehicles. It handles over 12,000 tons of residential and institutional refuse and recyclables a day. It has a uniformed force of unionized sanitation workers (Local 831 USA of the Teamsters). Its regulations are compiled in Title 16 of the New York City Rules.

There are nine uniformed titles in the New York City Department of Sanitation. From highest to lowest, the uniformed titles are described by Civil Service Title and/or Rank;

Title	Insignia
General Superintendent Level V (Director)	
General Superintendent Level IV (Chief)	
General Superintendent Level III (Assistant Chief)	
General Superintendent Level II (Deputy Chief)	
General Superintendent Level I (Superintendent)	
Supervisor	
Sanitation Worker	

=== Bureau of Cleaning and Collection (BCC) ===
The BCC is responsible for collecting recycling and garbage, cleaning streets and vacant lots, and clearing streets of snow and ice. BCC assigns personnel and equipment to standard routes while managing the weekly allocation of personnel to address litter and illegal dumping.

The Cleaning Office oversees the removal of litter and debris from city streets, collects material for recycling and garbage from public litter bins and coordinates with Derelict Vehicle Operations to remove abandoned vehicles. The Lot Cleaning Unit cleans vacant lots and the areas around them, and around city-owned buildings in order to meet the city's Health Code standards.

The Collection Office oversees regularly scheduled recycling and garbage collection services to the city's residential households, public schools, public buildings, and many large institutions

=== Solid Waste Management ===
The Solid Waste Management Bureau is responsible for the disposal of all municipal solid waste and recyclables managed by DSNY, and for long-term waste export programs. The bureau consists of Solid Waste Management Engineering, the Export Contract Management Unit, marine and land-based transfer stations, and the Fresh Kills landfill and long-term export programs.

The Export Contract Management Unit handles DSNY contracts with private vendors who operate municipal solid waste disposal facilities, including transfer stations and waste-to-energy plants. DSNY also has city-owned and operated transfer stations.

Solid Waste Management Engineering is principally responsible for the design, construction, closure and post-closure care, and end-use development of the 2,200-acre Fresh Kills landfill. It also develops and implements long-term waste export programs and the city's Comprehensive Solid Waste Management Plan for 2006–2025 and the Solid Waste Management Plan Final Environmental Impact Statement.

=== Bureau of Information Technology ===
The Bureau of Information Technology manages all aspects of computing and technology for DSNY, including networks, databases, software, devices, and technical support.

The bureau designed the Sanitation Management Analysis and Resource Tracking (SMART) system, a web-based mobile system that provides DSNY field forces with digital operations, scheduling, and reporting technology, and gives DSNY management instant access to real-time operational information. It is integrated with citywide systems such as GIS mapping services, fleet management, building management, human resources, and purchasing and financial applications.

=== Bureau Operations Office ===
The Bureau Operations Office is DSNY's primary communications center, handling interagency and intra-agency communications. To ensure efficient communications, the radio room maintains and monitors citywide radio communications, equipment repair, upgrades, maintenance, and inventory.

The Bureau oversees all DSNY facilities, administers the expense budget, and controls fuel and lubricant inventories, as well as tools and supplies for citywide use. It also plans and directs citywide snow operations, including staffing plans, maintaining the fleet of snow removal equipment, and maintaining an inventory of salt and calcium chloride to cover the needs of the snow season.

The Bureau's Equipment and Facilities Unit works closely with Support Services to make sure that DSNY facilities receive constant monitoring, repairs, renovation, and emergency intervention. The Bureau works closely with the Real Estate Division to properly plan for new facilities from an operational standpoint.

=== Operations Management Division ===
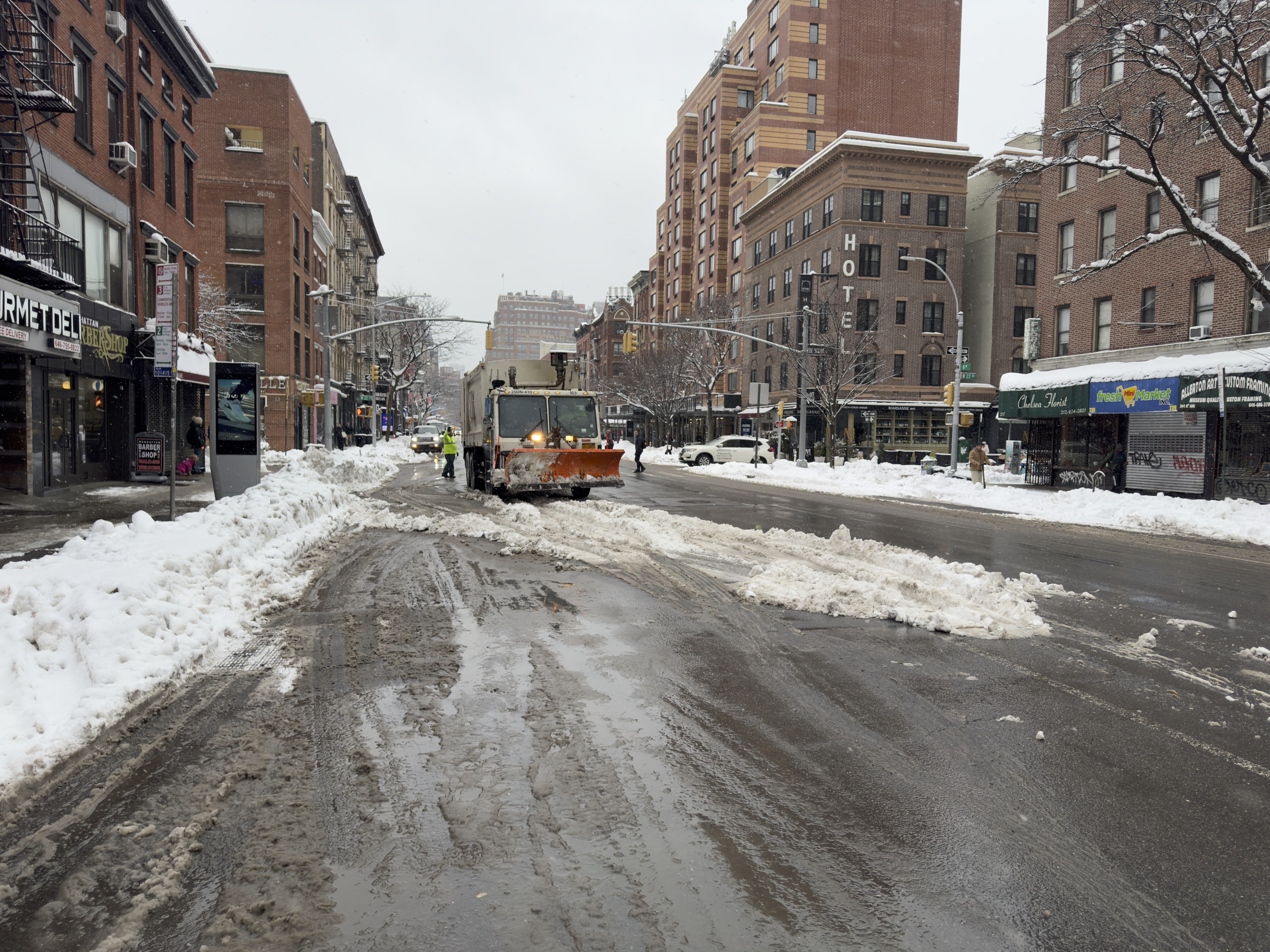
New York City Sanitation snow plow clearing sidewalk after Winter Storm Hernando in 2026

The Operations Management Division provides statistical review and analysis for evaluating DSNY's managerial and operational performance, including, most recently, a comprehensive review and sweeping redevelopment of the methodology used for citywide snow clearing operations. The division provides performance results to executive staff, field managers, and the public, to provide insight into organizational performance and help evaluate future initiatives. It also develops all departmental forms and provides reprographic services for the agency.

DSNY's Enterprise Geospatial Program Management Office, established in 2014, adds additional rigor to Operations Management functions by enabling and promoting purposeful geospatial data consumption and analysis throughout the agency, as well as the innovative technologies that make them possible. Its core objectives are to:

- Develop and maintain centralized and authoritative geospatial data stores and guarantee their integrity, accuracy and security
- Make geospatial data widely available and accessible across the agency via delivery through a combination of cutting-edge web applications and database technologies
- Provide leadership to align geospatial strategic planning, data standards and policies, tactical implementation and operational capability in accordance with DSNY's performance goals

=== Personnel Management Division ===
The Personnel Management Division coordinates with Human Resources on employee-related personal actions, such as the hiring process of new sanitation workers, promotions, demotions, employee evaluations, disciplinary matters, separation of service, and employee hardships. It also monitors the electronic disciplinary system for accuracy, and acts as the liaison between the Department Advocate and the field operations of the Bureau of Cleaning and Collection and the Solid Waste Management Unit. The division allocates general superintendents, supervisors, civilians, and sanitation workers assigned to medical-duty to support daily Cleaning and Collection field operations.

=== Division of Safety and Training ===
The Division of Safety and Training is responsible for all administrative and operational training to ensure that DSNY employees have the knowledge and skills to perform their jobs safely and effectively in a hazard-free work place. It also has the jurisdiction to enforce federal, state, city, and departmental laws, rules, and regulations pertaining to safe motor vehicle operation and work procedures, building maintenance, and driver's license requirements.

Responsibilities include developing and maintaining programs and training, investigating serious line-of-duty injuries and vehicular accidents, conducting orientation programs for new and recently promoted uniformed employees, and facilitating department-wide walk-throughs for workplace violence surveys and facility E-waste, standpipe, and sprinkler inspections.

=== Bureau of Motor Equipment ===
The Bureau of Motor Equipment provides a full range of fleet-related functions, such as design, research and development, procurement, maintenance, repair, and ultimately disposal of DSNY vehicles. All of these functions are performed through four main operating divisions — Field Operations, Material Management, Vehicle Acquisition and Warranty Division, and Central Repair Shop Operations.

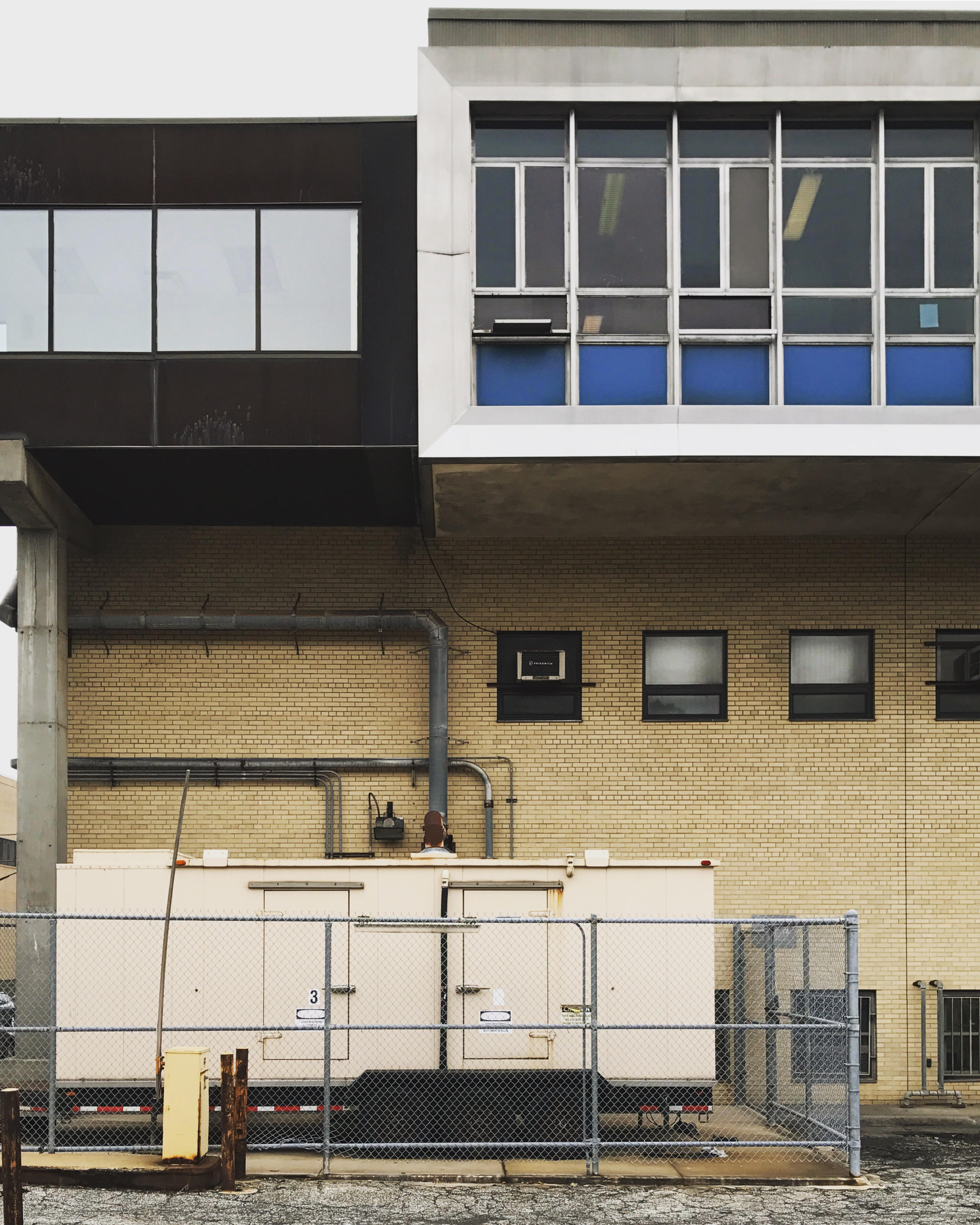

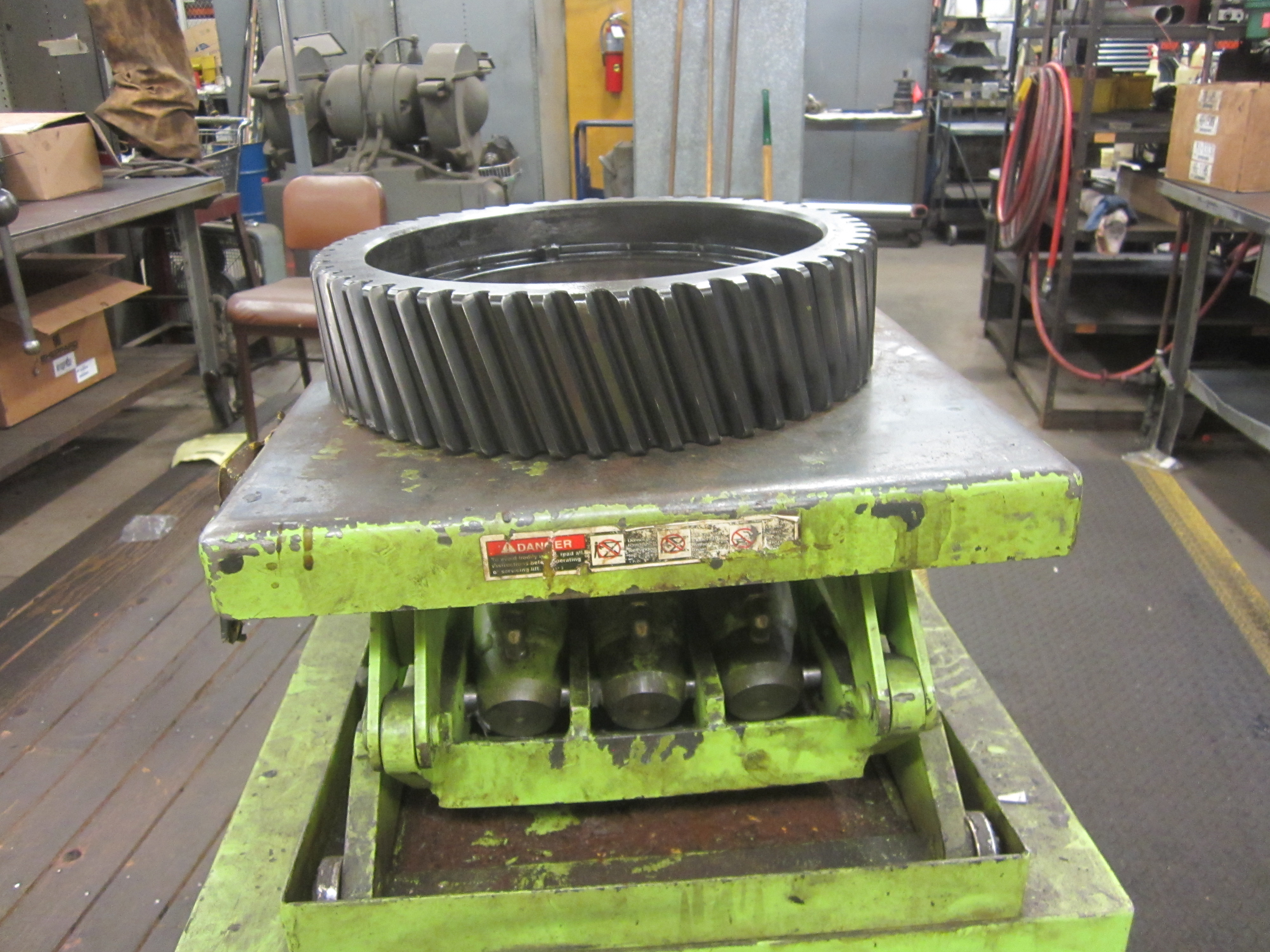

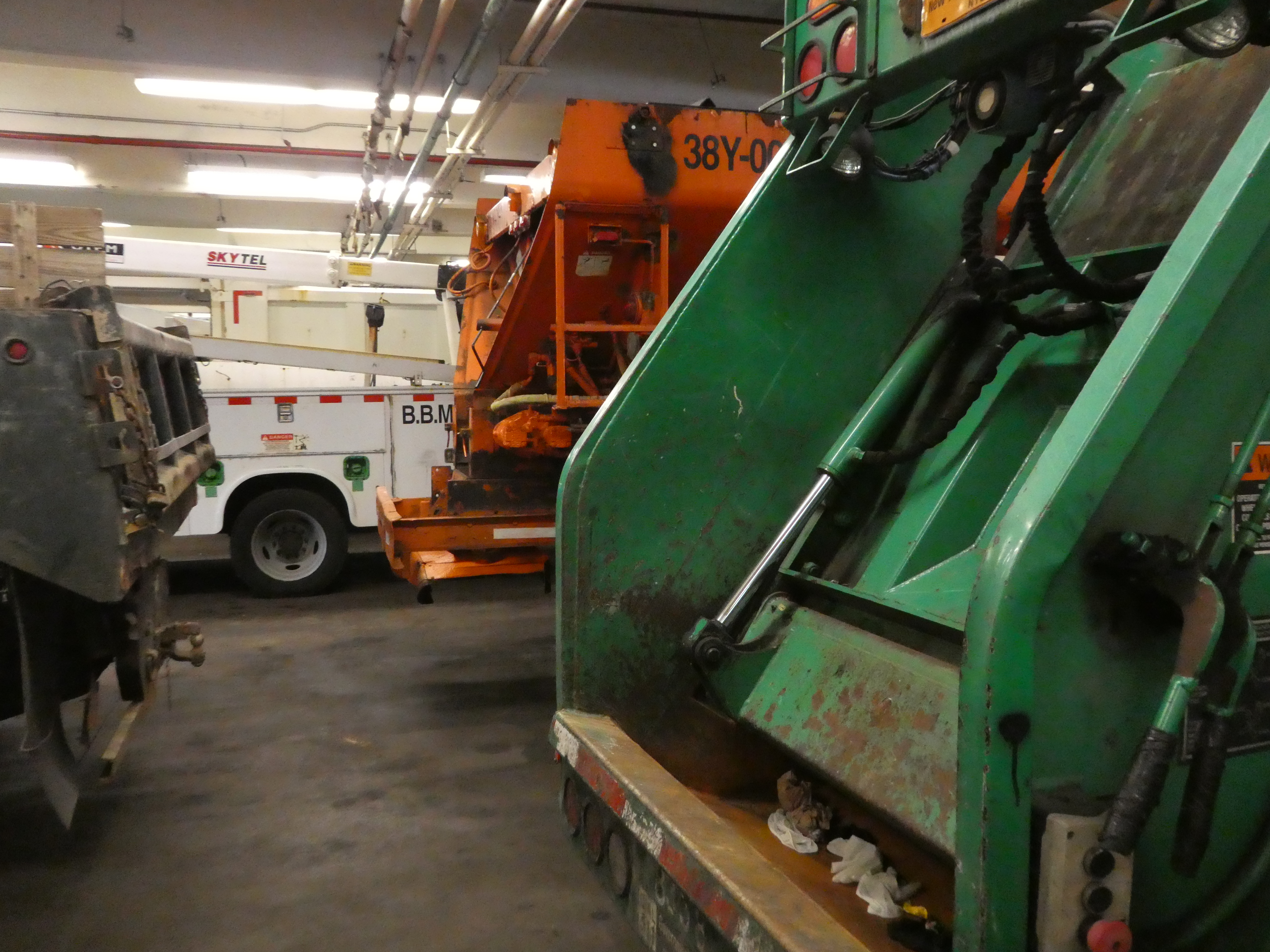

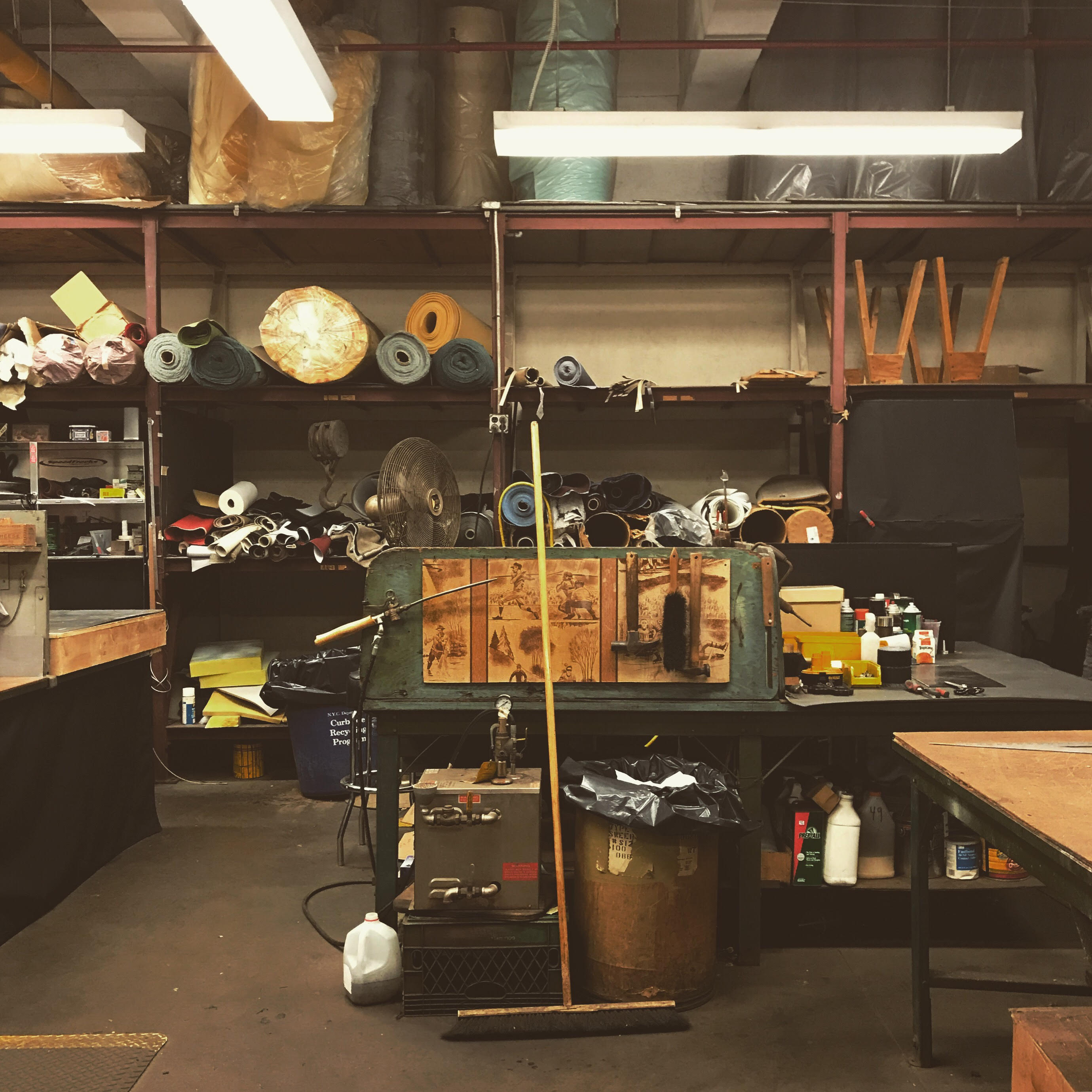

=== Bureau of Building Maintenance ===
The Bureau of Building Maintenance has responsibility for maintaining garages, transfer stations, repair shops, and office buildings throughout the five boroughs. The bureau employs carpenters, plumbers, electricians and other skilled trades who provide routine maintenance, facility rehabilitation, and emergency repairs. Together with Legal Affairs and Engineering, the Bureau of Building Maintenance ensures that DSNY facilities are in compliance with all federal, state, and local oversight regulations. The Bureau also works with the Department of Citywide Administrative Services to secure funding for energy reduction programs and to achieve carbon dioxide emission goals.

=== Law Enforcement Division ===
The Enforcement Division monitors compliance with administrative, recycling, and health laws governing the maintenance of clean streets, illegal posting and dumping, theft of recyclables, and proper storage and disposal of recycling and garbage by residents and businesses. It reports through the First Deputy Commissioner.

Sanitation law enforcement officers (Police Division) are licensed and armed New York City Special Patrolmen in connection with their special assignment of employment. Such designation confers limited New York State Peace Officer powers upon the employee, pursuant to New York State Criminal Procedure Law § 2.10 sub(59). Sanitation enforcement agents are unarmed civilians who undergo a comprehensive classroom and field-training program and have limited powers of arrest.

DSNY Police badge

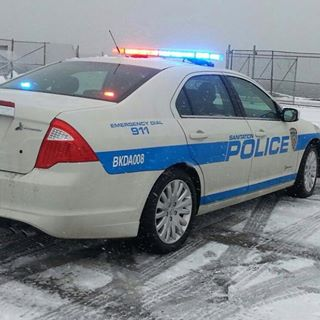
New York City Sanitation Police car

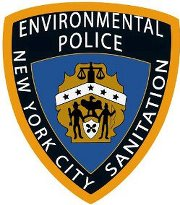
DSNY Environmental Police patch

=== Environmental Enforcement and the Permit Inspection Unit ===
The primary responsibility of the Permit Inspection Unit is the enforcement of Local Law 40, governing the permit and inspection processes of solid waste transfer stations and fill material operations within the city. Environmental police officers conduct regular inspections to ensure compliance with the rules and regulations relating to these activities.

The Permit Inspection Unit issues permits and conducts regular inspections of putrescible and non-putrescible transfer stations, fill material transfer stations, and fill material operations that involve the grading, leveling, or improvement of property. It also plays a main role in identifying and closing illegal transfer stations and dump sites, and works closely with DSNY Legal Affairs and various city, state, and federal agencies.

The Environmental Enforcement Unit enforces Local Laws 70 and 75, governing the storage, transportation, and disposal of asbestos and regulated medical waste. Environmental enforcement unit respond to incidents involving the improper disposal of chemicals, household hazardous waste, low-level radioactive waste, and medical waste. The unit also conducts inspections of hospitals and nursing homes to ensure proper disposal of regulated medical waste, and inspects medical practices operating in multi-dwelling buildings to ensure compliance with Local Law 41.

=== Legal Affairs ===
The Bureau of Legal Affairs is DSNY's in-house legal department which has various divisions, including Contracts, Environmental Affairs, Intergovernmental, the Advocate's Office and the Agency Chief Contracting Office. These divisions provide legal counsel, advice, and assistance to the other bureaus in connection with procuring and managing contracts, drafting and enforcing statutes and regulations, regulating solid waste transfer stations, and working with other government departments and agencies.

The Bureau serves as DSNY's liaison with the City Council and State Legislature, manages DSNY's City Environmental Quality Review processes, coordinates DSNY's responses to Freedom of Information Law requests for documents, and provides litigation support to the City's Law Department in connection with lawsuits involving DSNY. The Bureau provides legal counsel on employment and personnel matters, is DSNY's advisor on the legal aspects of environmental compliance efforts, and works closely with DSNY engineers to resolve controversies, allow construction projects to continue, and avoid disputes and litigation.

== District garages ==
=== Bronx ===
- Bronx 1 – 680 East 132nd Street, Bronx, NY – serves Mott Haven, Port Morris, and Melrose
- Bronx 2 – 650 Casanova Street, Bronx, NY – serves Hunts Point, Longwood, and Morrisania
- Bronx 3 – 680 East 132nd Street, Bronx, NY – serves Crotona Park, Claremont Village, Concourse Village, and Woodstock
- Bronx 4 (Nelson Diaz Garage) – 720 East 132 Street, Bronx, NY – serves Highbridge, Concourse, and Mount Eden
- Bronx 5 – 1331 Cromwell Avenue, Bronx, NY – serves Fordham, University Heights, Morris Heights, Bathgate, and Mount Hope
- Bronx 6 (Rafael Concepcion Garage) – 800 East 176 Street, Bronx, NY – serves Belmont, West Farms, East Tremont, and Bronx Park South
- Bronx 7 – 423 West 215th Street, New York, NY – serves Norwood, Jerome Park, Bedford Park, and Kingsbridge Heights
- Bronx 8 – (Rafael Concepcion Garage) – 800 East 176 Street, Bronx, NY – serves Fieldston, Kingsbridge, Marble Hill, Riverdale, Spuyten Duyvil, and Van Cortlandt Village
- Bronx 9 – 850 Zerega Avenue, Bronx, NY – serves Parkchester, Unionport, Soundview, Castle Hill, Bruckner, Harding Park, Bronx River, and Clason Point
- Bronx 10 – 850 Zerega Avenue, Bronx, NY – serves Co-op City, City Island, Spencer Estates, Throggs Neck, Country Club, Zerega, Westchester Square, Pelham Bay, Eastchester Bay, Schuylerville, Edgewater, Locust Point, and Silver Beach
- Bronx 11 – 800 Zerega Avenue, Bronx, NY – serves Allerton, Bronx Park East, Eastchester Gardens, Indian Village, Morris Park, Olinville, Parkside, Pelham Gardens, Pelham Parkway, Van Nest, and Westchester Heights
- Bronx 12 – 1635 East 233rd Street, Bronx, NY – serves Edenwald, Wakefield, Williamsbridge, Woodlawn, Fish Bay, Eastchester, Olinville, and Baychester

=== Brooklyn ===
==== Brooklyn North ====
- Brooklyn 1 – 161 Varick Avenue, Brooklyn, NY – serves Williamsburg and Greenpoint
- Brooklyn 2 (Alfred G. Timmons Garage) – 465 Hamilton Avenue, Brooklyn, NY – serves Brooklyn Heights, Fulton Mall, Boerum Hill, Fort Greene, Brooklyn Navy Yard, Fulton Ferry, and Clinton Hill
- Brooklyn 3 – 525 Johnson Avenue, Brooklyn, NY – serves Bedford-Stuyvesant, Stuyvesant Heights, and part of Ocean Hill
- Brooklyn 4 (Eva Barrientos Garage) – 161 Varick Avenue, Brooklyn, NY – serves Bushwick
- Brooklyn 5 – 606 Milford Street, Brooklyn, NY – serves East New York, Cypress Hills, Highland Park, New Lots, City Line, Spring Creek, and Starrett City
- Brooklyn 8 – 1755 Pacific Street, Brooklyn, NY – serves part of Crown Heights, Prospect Heights, and Weeksville
- Brooklyn 9 – 690 New York Avenue, Brooklyn, NY – serves part of Crown Heights, Prospect Lefferts Gardens, and Wingate
- Brooklyn 16 (Michael Gennardo Garage) – 922 Georgia Avenue, Brooklyn, NY – serves Brownsville and part of Ocean Hill
- Brooklyn 17 – 105-02 Avenue D, Brooklyn, NY – serves East Flatbush, Remsen Village, Farragut, Rugby, Erasmus, and Ditmas Village

==== Brooklyn South ====
- Brooklyn 6 – 127 2nd Avenue, Brooklyn, NY – serves Red Hook, Carroll Gardens, Park Slope, Gowanus, and Cobble Hill
- Brooklyn 7 – 5100 1st Avenue, Brooklyn, NY – serves Sunset Park and Windsor Terrace
- Brooklyn 10 – 5100 1st Avenue, Brooklyn, NY – serves Bay Ridge, Dyker Heights, and Fort Hamilton
- Brooklyn 11 (Michael Hanly Garage) – 1824 Shore Parkway, Brooklyn, NY – serves Bath Beach, Gravesend, Mapleton, and Bensonhurst
- Brooklyn 12 (Frank Consalvo Garage) – 5602 19th Avenue, Brooklyn, NY – serves Borough Park, Kensington, Ocean Parkway, and Midwood
- Brooklyn 13 (Allen Gormley Garage) – 2012 Neptune Avenue, Brooklyn, NY – serves Coney Island, Brighton Beach, Bensonhurst, Gravesend, and Seagate
- Brooklyn 14 – 1397 Ralph Avenue, Brooklyn, NY – serves Flatbush, Midwood, Kensington, and Ocean Parkway
- Brooklyn 15 – 2501 Knapp Street, Brooklyn, NY – serves Sheepshead Bay, Manhattan Beach, Kings Bay, Gerritsen Beach, Kings Highway, East Gravesend, Madison, Homecrest, and Plum Beach
- Brooklyn 18 – 105-01 Foster Avenue, Brooklyn, NY – serves Canarsie, Bergen Beach, Mill Basin, Flatlands, Marine Park, Georgetown, and Mill Island

=== Manhattan ===
- Manhattan 1 – 353 Spring Street New York, NY – serves Tribeca, Financial District, and Battery Park City
- Manhattan 2 – 353 Spring Street New York, NY – serves Greenwich Village, West Village, NoHo, SoHo, Lower East Side, Chinatown, and Little Italy
- Manhattan 3 – South Street, Pier 36, New York, NY – serves Tompkins Square, East Village, Lower East Side, Chinatown and Two Bridges
- Manhattan 4 – 650 West 57th Street, New York, NY – serves Clinton and Chelsea
- Manhattan 5 – 353 Spring Street, New York, NY – serves Midtown
- Manhattan 6 – South Street, Pier 36 (interim location), New York, NY – serves Stuyvesant Town–Peter Cooper Village, Tudor City, Turtle Bay, Murray Hill, Gramercy Park, Kips Bay, Sutton Place
- Manhattan 7 – 650 West 57th Street, New York, NY – serves Manhattan Valley, Upper West Side, and Lincoln Square
- Manhattan 8 – 4036 9th Avenue, New York, NY – serves Upper East Side, Lenox Hill, Yorkville and Roosevelt Island
- Manhattan 9 – 125 East 149th Street, Bronx, NY – serves Hamilton Heights, Manhattanville, Morningside Heights, and West Harlem
- Manhattan 10 – 110 East 131st Street, New York, NY – serves Harlem
- Manhattan 11 – 343 East 99th Street, 2nd Floor, New York, NY – serves East Harlem
- Manhattan 12 – 301 West 215th Street, New York, NY – serves Inwood and Washington Heights

=== Queens ===
==== Queens East ====
- Queens 7 – 120-15 31st Avenue, Flushing, NY – serves Flushing, Bay Terrace, College Point, Whitestone, Malba, Beechhurst, Queensboro Hill, and Willets Point
- Queens 8 – 130-23 150th Avenue, Queens, NY – serves Fresh Meadows, Cunningham Heights, Hilltop Village, Pomonok Houses, Jamaica Estates, Holliswood, Flushing South, Utopia, Kew Gardens Hills, and Briarwood
- Queens 10 (Rodney Page Garage) – 130–23 150th Avenue, Queens, NY – serves Howard Beach, Ozone Park, South Ozone Park, Richmond Hill, Tudor Village, and Lindenwood
- Queens 11 – 75-05 Winchester Boulevard, Jamaica, NY – serves Bayside, Douglaston, Little Neck, Auburndale, East Flushing, Oakland Gardens, and Hollis Hills
- Queens 12 – 130-23 150th Avenue, Queens, NY – serves Jamaica, Hollis, St. Albans, Springfield Gardens, Baisley Park, Rochdale Village, and South Jamaica
- Queens 13 – 153-67 146th Avenue, Jamaica, NY – serves Queens Village, Glen Oaks, New Hyde Park, Bellerose, Cambria Heights, Laurelton, Rosedale, Floral Park, and Brookville
- Queens 14 (Stephen Dixon Garage) – 51-10 Almeda Avenue, Far Rockaway, NY – serves Breezy Point, Belle Harbor, Broad Channel, Neponsit, Arverne, Bayswater, Edgemere, Rockaway Park, Rockaway, and Far Rockaway

==== Queens West ====
- Queens 1 (Frank Justich Garage) – 34-28 21st Street, Queens, NY – serves Astoria, Old Astoria, part of Long Island City, Queensbridge, Ditmars, Ravenswood, Steinway, Garden Bay, and part of Woodside
- Queens 2 – 52-35 58th Street, Woodside, NY – serves part of Long Island City, part of Woodside, and Sunnyside
- Queens 3 – 52-35 58th Street, Woodside, NY – serves Jackson Heights, East Elmhurst, North Corona, and La Guardia Airport
- Queens 4 – 52-35 58th Street, Woodside, NY – serves Corona, Corona Heights, Elmhurst, and Newtown
- Queens 5 – 47-01 48th Street, Queens, NY – serves Ridgewood, Glendale, Middle Village, Maspeth, and Liberty Park
- Queens 5A (Steven Frosch Garage) – 58-02 48th Street, Maspeth, NY
- Queens 6 – 58-73 53rd Avenue, Woodside, NY – serves Forest Hills and Rego Park
- Queens 9 – 132-05 Atlantic Avenue, Jamaica, NY – serves Richmond Hill, Woodhaven, Ozone Park, and Kew Gardens

=== Staten Island ===
- Staten Island 1 – 539 Jersey Street, Staten Island, NY – serves Arlington, Castleton Corners, Clifton, Concord, Elm Park, Fort Wadsworth, Graniteville, Grymes Hill, Livingston, Mariners Harbor, Meiers Corners, New Brighton, Port Ivory, Port Richmond, Randall Manor, Rosebank, St. George, Shore Acres, Silver Lake, Stapleton, Sunnyside, Tompkinsville, West Brighton, and Westerleigh
- Staten Island 2 – 2500 Richmond Avenue, Staten Island, NY – serves Arrochar, Bloomfield, Bulls Head, Chelsea, Dongan Hills, Egbertville, Emerson Hill, Grant City, Grasmere, High Rock, Lighthouse Hill, Midland Beach, New Dorp, New Springville, Oakwood, Ocean Breeze, Old Town, Richmondtown, South Beach, Todt Hill, and Travis
- Staten Island 3 – 1000 West Service Road, Staten Island, NY – serves Annadale, Arden Heights, Bay Terrace, Charleston, Eltingville, Great Kills, Greenridge, Huguenot, Pleasant Plains, Prince's Bay, Richmondtown, Richmond Valley, Rossville, Tottenville, and Woodrow

== Commissioners ==
Number	Name	Dates in Office	Administration	Notes and References
As Chairman of a Three-man Commission of the Department of Street Cleaning
1	James S. Coleman	June 16, 1881 – December 30, 1889	William R. Grace; Franklin Edson; William R. Grace; Abram Hewitt; Hugh J. Grant	
–	vacant	December 31, 1889 – January 17, 1890		
2	Horace Loomis	January 17, 1890 – April 3, 1890	Hugh J. Grant	
3	Hans S. Beattie	April 3, 1890 – September 16, 1891	Hugh J. Grant	
–	William Dalton	September 16, 1891 (acting)	Hugh J. Grant	
4	Thomas Sebastian Brennan	September 17, 1891 – July 21, 1893	Hugh J. Grant; Thomas F. Gilroy	
5	William S. Andrews	July 21, 1893 – January 15, 1895	Thomas F. Gilroy; William L. Strong	
6	George E. Waring, Jr.	January 15, 1895 – December 31, 1897	William L. Strong	
7	James McCartney	January 1, 1898 – February 7, 1900	Robert A. Van Wyck	
–	vacant	February 7, 1900 – February 12, 1900		
8	Percival E. Nagle	February 12, 1900 – December 31, 1901	Robert A. Van Wyck	
9	John McGaw Woodbury	January 1, 1902 – October 13, 1906	Seth Low; George B. McClellan, Jr.	
10	MacDonough Craven	October 22, 1906 – July 9, 1907	George B. McClellan, Jr.	
11	Walter Bensel	July 9, 1907 – November 21, 1907	George B. McClellan, Jr.	
12	Foster Crowell	November 22, 1907 – January 1, 1909	George B. McClellan, Jr.	
13	William H. Edwards	January 1, 1909 – December 31, 1913	George B. McClellan, Jr. William Jay Gaynor; Ardolph L. Kline	
14	John T. Fetherston	January 1, 1914 – December 31, 1917	John Purroy Mitchel	
15	Arnold B. MacStay	January 1, 1918 – January 30, 1918 (acting); January 30, 1918 – January 2, 1921	John F. Hylan	
16	John P. Leo	January 5, 1921 – November 18, 1921	John F. Hylan	
17	Alfred A. Taylor	November 18, 1921 – November 25, 1921 (acting); November 25, 1921 – November 30, 1929	John F. Hylan; Jimmy Walker	
As a Three-man Commission of the Department of Sanitation
18	William J. Schroeder, Jr. (chairman); Leonard C.L. Smith (engineering member); Charles S. Hand (lay member)	November 30, 1929 – April 18, 1933; December 30, 1929 – April 18, 1933; June 3, 1930 – April 18, 1933	Jimmy Walker; Joseph V. McKee; John P. O'Brien	
As a Single Commissioner
19	George McAneny	April 19, 1933 – September 19, 1933	John P. O'Brien	
	vacant	September 19, 1933 – September 29, 1933		
20	Ernest P. Goodrich	September 29, 1933 – March 7, 1934	John P. O'Brien; Fiorello H. La Guardia	
21	Thomas W. Hammond	March 7, 1934 – June 2, 1934 (acting); June 2, 1934 – May 26, 1936	Fiorello H. La Guardia	
22	William F. Carey	May 26, 1936 – December 31, 1945	Fiorello H. La Guardia	
23	William J. Powell	January 1, 1946 – December 21, 1949	William O'Dwyer	
24	Andrew W. Mulrain	December 21, 1949 – February 25, 1957	William O'Dwyer; Vincent R. Impellitteri; Robert F. Wagner	
25	Paul R. Screvane	February 25, 1957 – March 3, 1961	Robert F. Wagner	
26	Frank J. Lucia	March 3, 1961 – December 31, 1965	Robert F. Wagner	
27	Joseph F. Periconi	January 1, 1966 – November 23, 1966	John V. Lindsay	
28	Samuel J. Kearing, Jr.	November 23, 1966 – November 17, 1967	John V. Lindsay	
–	James Lewis Marcus	November 17, 1967 – December 12, 1967 (acting)	John V. Lindsay	
–	Fioravente Gerald Gabriel Perrotta	December 12, 1967 – December 26, 1967 (acting)	John V. Lindsay	
–	Maurice Milton Feldman	December 26, 1967 – June 4, 1968 (acting)	John V. Lindsay	
–	James P. Marron	named on January 28, 1968, unable to take office because of illness, died June 18, 1968		
29	Griswold Lamour Moeller	June 4, 1968 – July 14, 1970	John V. Lindsay	
–	Jerome Kretchmer	August 17, 1970 – April 26, 1971 (acting)	John V. Lindsay	
30	Herbert Elish	April 26, 1971 – April 30, 1974	John V. Lindsay; Abraham D. Beame	
31	Robert T. Groh	April 30, 1974 – October 3, 1975	Abraham D. Beame	
–	Martin Lang	October 3, 1975 – January 5, 1976 (acting)	Abraham D. Beame	
32	Anthony Thomas Vaccarello	January 5, 1976 – November 5, 1978	Abraham D. Beame; Edward I. Koch	
33	Norman Steisel	November 5, 1978 – January 23, 1986	Edward I. Koch	
34	Brendan John Sexton	January 24, 1986 – April 18, 1990	Edward I. Koch; David N. Dinkins	
35	Steven M. Polan	April 18, 1990 – February 1992	David N. Dinkins	
36	Emily S. Lloyd	February 1992 – July 15, 1994	David N. Dinkins; Rudolph W. Giuliani	
37	John J. Doherty	August 11, 1994 – September 20, 1998	Rudolph W. Giuliani	
38	Kevin Farrell	March 15, 1999 – July 9, 2001	Rudolph W. Giuliani	
–	John J. Doherty	January 1, 2002 – March 28, 2014 (second term)	Michael Bloomberg	
39	Kathryn Garcia	April 1, 2014 – February 15, 2019	Bill de Blasio	
–	Steven Costas	February 15, 2019 – July 8, 2019 (acting commissioner while Garcia was interim chairwoman of the New York City Housing Authority)	Bill de Blasio	
39	Kathryn Garcia	July 8, 2019 – September 18, 2020	Bill de Blasio	
40	Edward Grayson	September 18, 2020 – December 31, 2020 (acting); December 31, 2020 – April 14, 2022	Bill de Blasio; Eric Adams	
–	Salvatore Ceraulo	April 14, 2022 – April 18, 2022 (acting)	Eric Adams	
41	Jessica Tisch	April 18, 2022 – November 25, 2024	Eric Adams	
–	Javier Lojan	November 25, 2024 – March 18, 2026 (acting)	Eric Adams; Zohran Mamdani	
42	Gregory Anderson	March 18, 2026 – current	Zohran Mamdani	

== Artist in Residence ==
Since 1977, Mierle Laderman Ukeles has been the Artist in Residence (unsalaried) of the New York City Department of Sanitation. She is the only artist to ever hold that position.

In her work Touch Sanitation (1979-80), taking almost a year, Ukeles met over 8500 employees of the New York Sanitation Department, shaking hands with each of them and saying, "Thank you for keeping New York City alive". She documented her activities on a map, recording her conversations with the workers. Ukeles documented the workers' private stories in an attempt to change some of the negative words used about them.

== Gallery ==
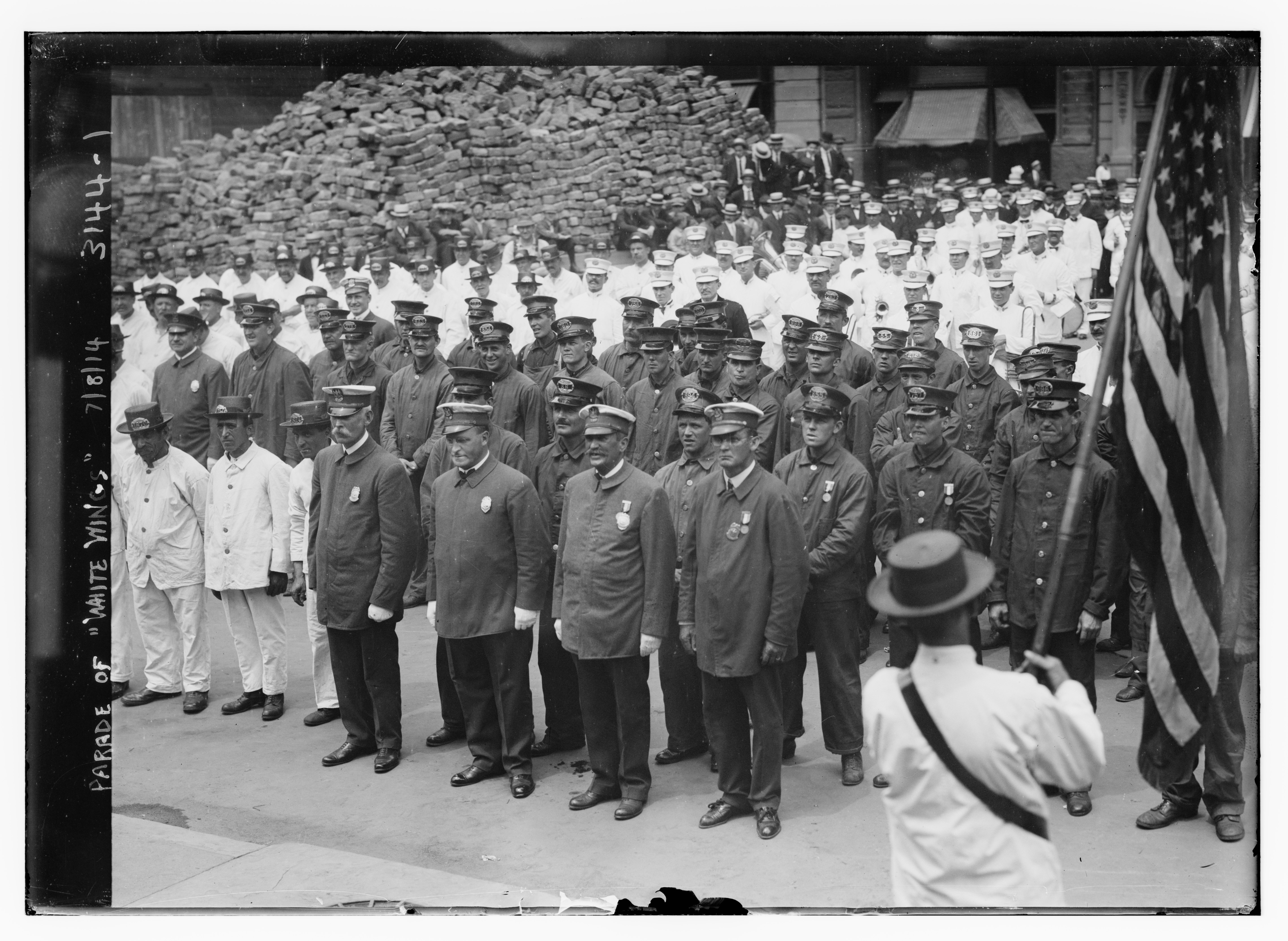
"White Wings" sanitation workers, 1914

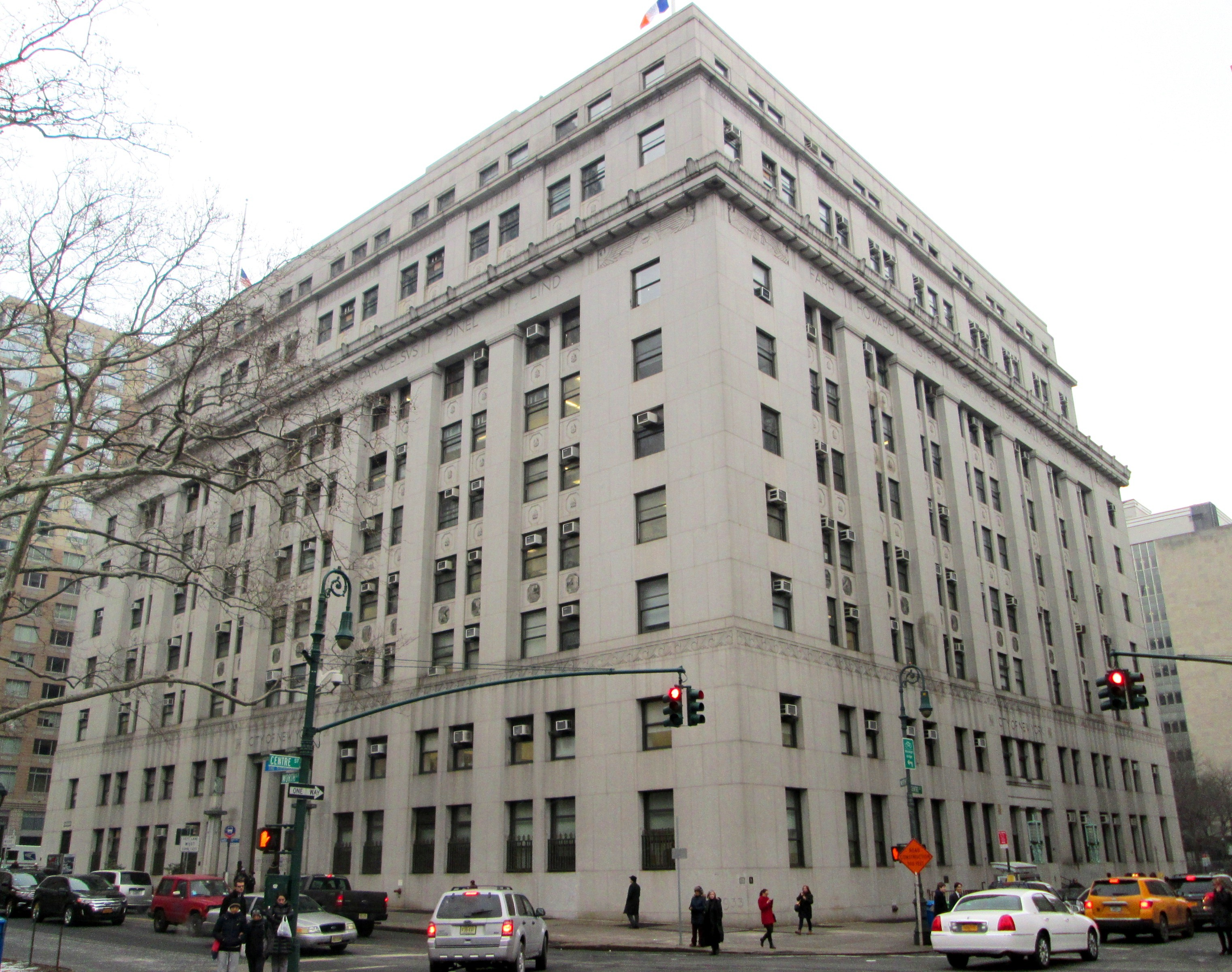
125 Worth Street, the department's headquarters

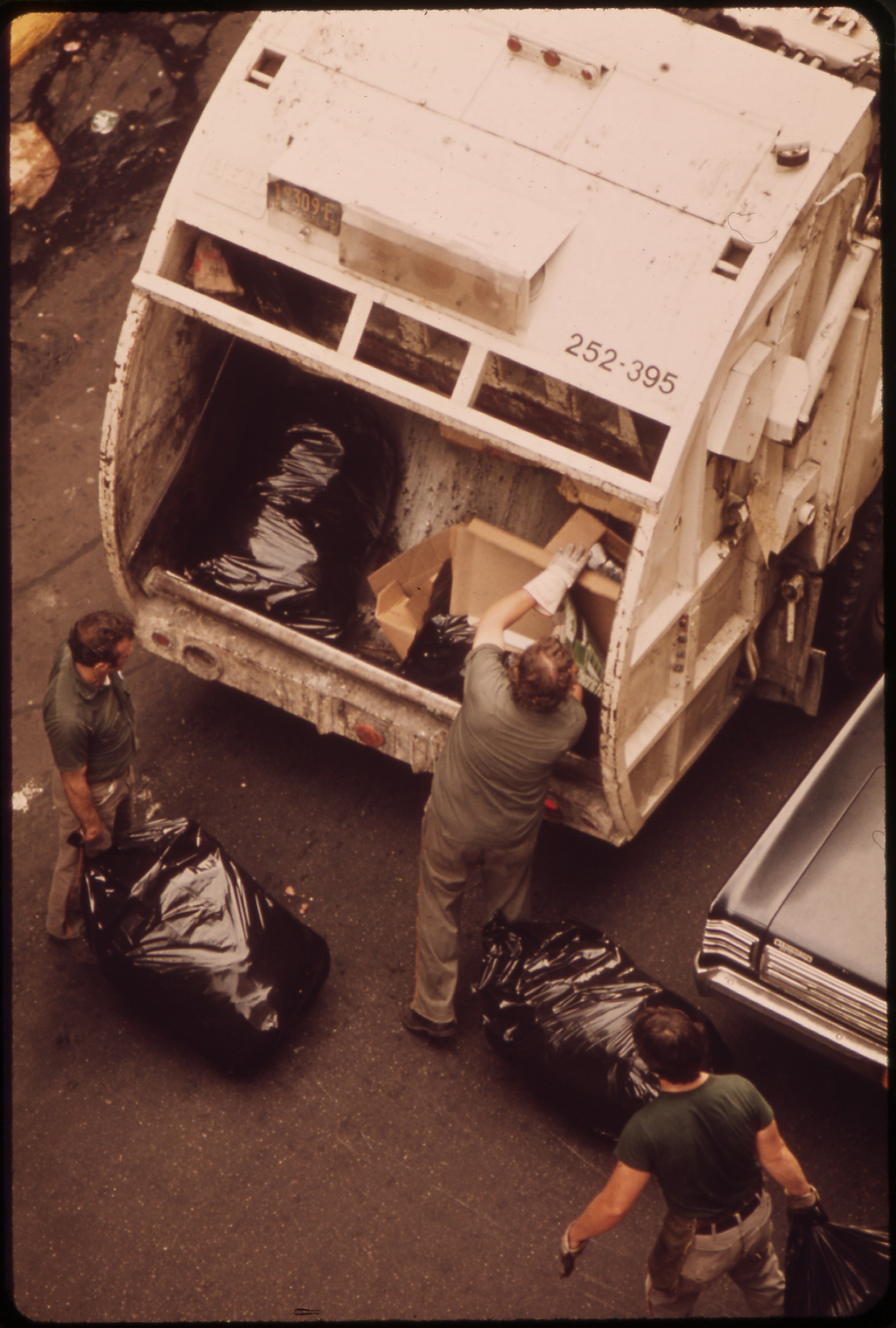
Sanitation workers picking up garbage on 172nd Street in 1973

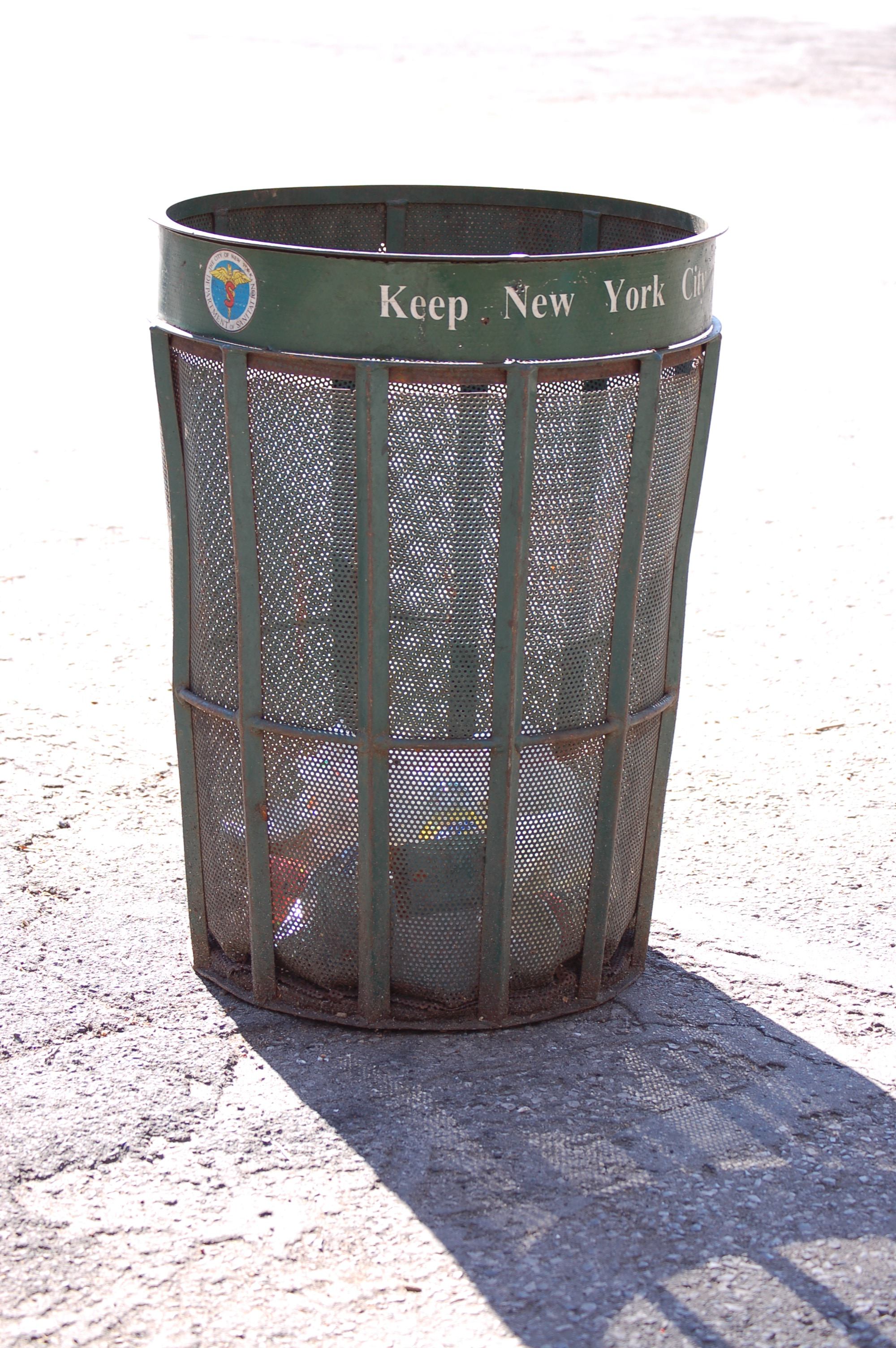
A typical New York City street waste basket

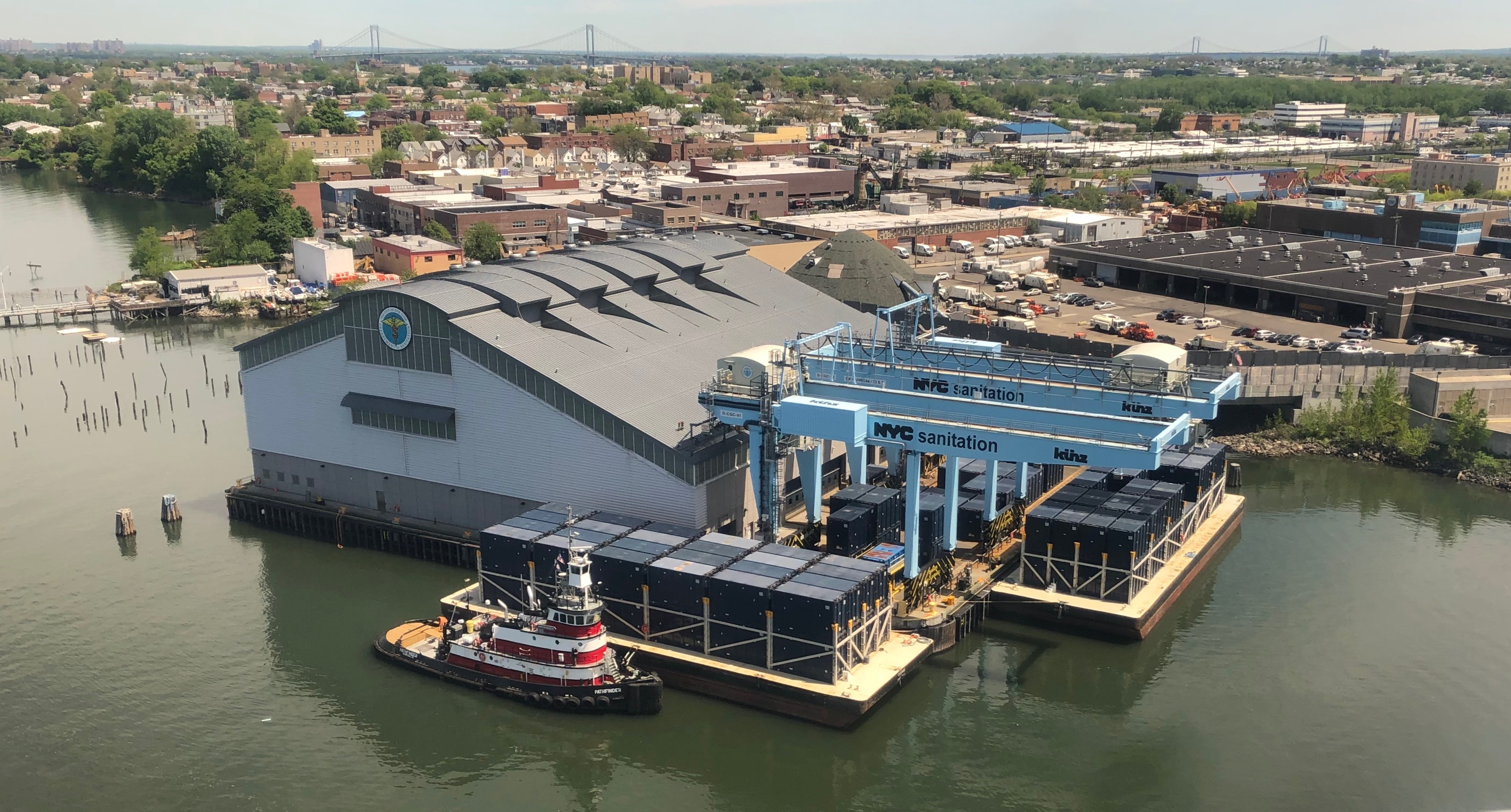
North Shore Marine Transfer Station - Queens 7

== See also ==
- Essex County Resource Recovery Facility
- New York City Office of Administrative Trials and Hearings (OATH), for hearings conducted on summonses for quality of life violations issued by the Department
