= Fernando Mateo =

Dominican-American businessman, activist and politician

- Born: 1957 or 1958 (age 68); Santo Domingo, Distrito Nacional, Dominican Republic
- Occupations: Entrepreneur, community activist
- Political party: Republican
- Spouse: Stella Mateo
- Children: 3

Fernando Mateo (born 1957 or 1958) is a Dominican-American businessman, activist, and politician who ran unsuccessfully for mayor of New York City in the 2021 mayoral election.

== Early life and career ==
Mateo was born in 1957 or 1958 in the Dominican Republic, the youngest in a family of ten children, and grew up on the Lower East Side of Manhattan. His father, Kristobal, worked as a taxi driver and later opened a bodega, while his mother, Carmen, was a stay-at-home mom. He attended Seward Park High School, but dropped out at the age of 15. Three years later, in 1976, he started a carpeting business which eventually grew into a multi-million dollar contracting firm.

== Community and political activism ==
In 1989, Mateo founded the Mateo Institute of Training, which worked to train non-violent, first-time offenders at Rikers Island in vocational trades such as plumbing and carpetlaying. For these efforts, he received a Points of Light award from President George H. W. Bush in 1991.

In 1993, amid a wave of gun violence sweeping New York City, Mateo started Toys for Guns, a program by which residents could voluntarily turn in guns to the NYPD in return for gift certificates to local toy stores. By the time the program was shut down in 1995, it had removed an estimated 3,000 firearms from the city's streets.

=== Civic advocacy ===
In September 1998, after a spate of murders perpetrated against taxicab drivers in Brooklyn and The Bronx, Mateo was appointed president of the New York State Federation of Taxi Drivers. As president, he successfully lobbied the New York City Council to install bulletproof partitions in the city's cabs. He continues to hold the position as of 2021, frequently acting as a spokesman for the city's taxi drivers as well as for the employees of ridesharing companies such as Uber.

Mateo is a spokesman for United Bodegas of America, an organization which advocates for the owners of bodegas (small, owner-operated convenience stores which are especially common in New York). In 2010, Mateo helped run a campaign to encourage New York's bodega owners to buy handguns as a deterrent to robbery.

=== Political activities ===
In the mid-2000s, Mateo emerged as a leading Republican activist and fundraiser. In 2002, he raised $400,000 for New York Governor George Pataki's re-election campaign. In 2003, he was a major fundraiser for President George W. Bush, who named him to the White House Commission on Presidential Scholars. In 2004, he spoke at the Republican National Convention. In 2005, Mateo served as Hispanic Director for the re-election campaign of then-New York City Mayor Michael Bloomberg.

In 2012, Mateo supported Texas Governor Rick Perry's presidential campaign, organizing a fundraiser for Perry in Manhattan's Inwood neighborhood.

In June 2025, Mateo supported President Donald Trump's Immigration and Customs Enforcement raids and deportations, saying "He's going after the right people" and "President Trump came in, and all the criminals are out. I applaud that." He said that United Bodegas of America gives bodega workers "the comfort of knowing that the president isn't going after them."

== Controversies ==
=== Illegal campaign donations ===
In June 2016, the New York Post claimed Mateo had admitted to illegally donating $18,800 to Mayor Bill de Blasio's re-election campaign. The incident was part of a larger controversy around de Blasio's campaign fundraising activities; the same year, Mateo was questioned by the FBI about his role in introducing de Blasio associates Jona Rechnitz and Jeremy Reichberg to Westchester County Executive Rob Astorino, all of whom subsequently became embroiled in a corruption scandal. While Mateo's stated motivation for donating to de Blasio was to help an acquaintance find a city job, the Post would speculate that Mateo expected "a lot of access and influence with the [Mayor's] office" in exchange for the donations. Mateo was not charged with a crime for these activities, and blames de Blasio for the scheme.

=== La Marina controversy ===
In 2007, Mateo was part of a group that bid on a New York City Parks Department concession license to renovate and operate a marina and restaurant on parkland near Dyckman street in Upper Manhattan. The group proposed the name "La Marina" in their proposal. After losing the bid, Mateo later bought a controlling interest in the winning operator in 2011, which was in the process of building a restaurant to be called "Costera".

The restaurant was duly renamed La Marina and opened in 2012. The actual marina never opened as promised—its grounds were instead converted to a massive outdoor event space for concerts attended by thousands of people every summer weekend. As the concession license and agency approvals forbid concerts, amplified music past 10 pm and a capacity above 500 patrons the residents of the surrounding neighborhoods began to complain about the impacts and questioned why Mateo and his associates routinely violated the terms of the contract, including seizing multiple blocks of city land for unapproved "rogue" valet-parking services that drew enormous traffic and gridlocked the area. Geoffrey Croft of the advocacy group NYC Park Advocates accused Mateo of using his political connections to prevent the contract from being enforced.

The dock was built years behind schedule using a federal grant, but violated the terms of that grant by not offering the promised services and access to boaters, according to a report by the United States Fish and Wildlife Service. The grant terms were later modified for a marina of smaller size but even so never had a single paying overnight customer or seasonal mooring according to a New York City comptroller audit The concession license had to eventually be cancelled and the marina taken over by NYC Parks to operate directly.

In July 2018, responding to community complaints, the NYPD led a multi-agency raid on Mateo's restaurant and found a large number of sanitary violations. In November of that year, an employee was arrested for selling illegal drugs on La Marina's premises, and the following month, the restaurant's liquor license was suspended. In February 2019, La Marina filed for bankruptcy, and was bought out later that year by restaurateur Jimmy Goldman.

Mateo himself later claimed that he had been "set up" and "assaulted by every city agency" and that most of the violations found in the 2018 raid had been based on false pretenses, characterizing the raid as "retaliation against me personally" from "certain people at the NYPD".

== 2021 New York City mayoral campaign ==
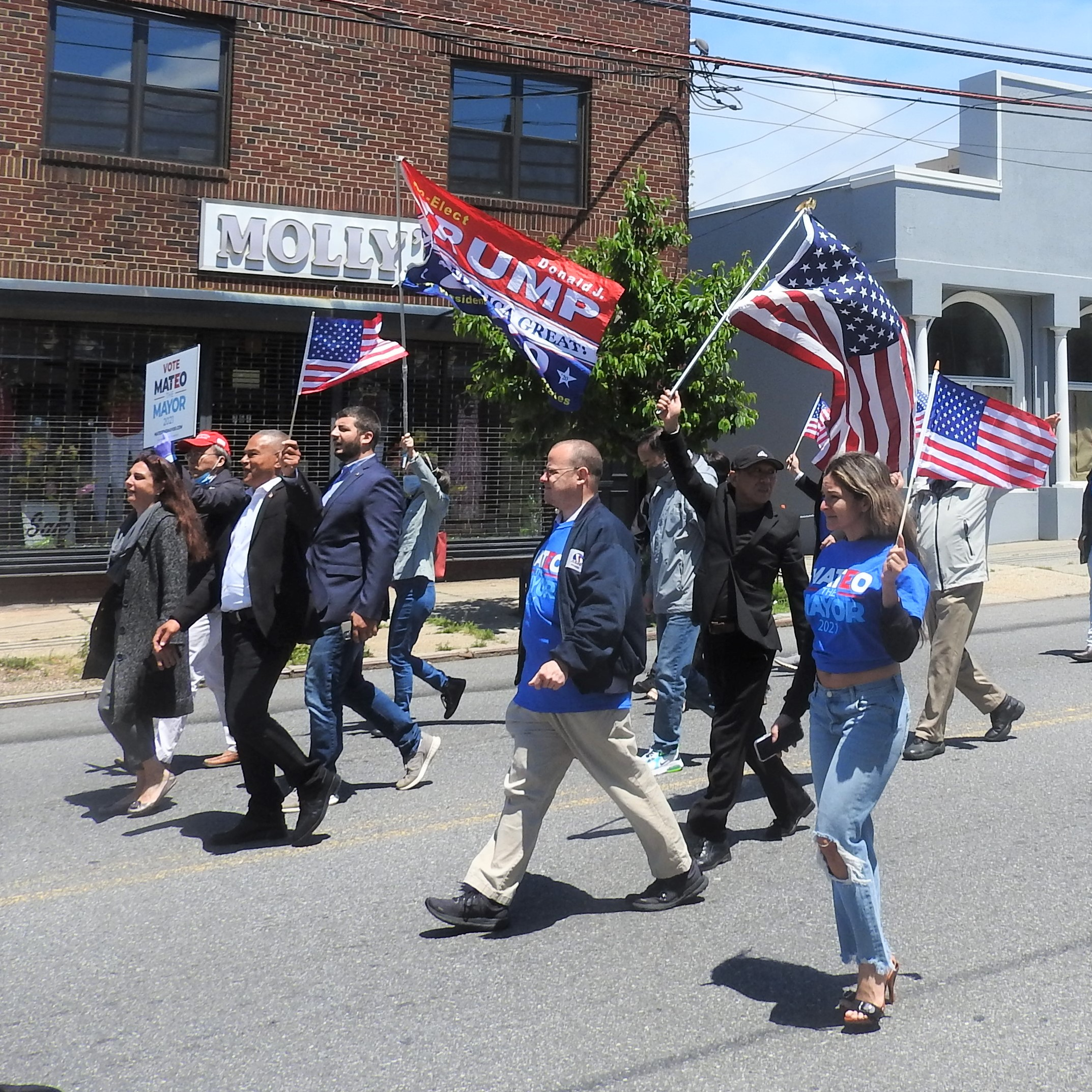
Mateo participating in the Staten Island Memorial Day Parade

On February 3, 2021, Mateo announced that he would be running for Mayor of New York City in the 2021 mayoral election. Describing himself as an "urban Republican" who has "done most of [his] work for the Democratic community", he cited public safety, job creation, and affordable housing as his top priorities.

Mateo's opponent in the Republican primary was talk radio host and Guardian Angels founder Curtis Sliwa. Sara Tirschwell withdrew from the Republican primary case in April 2021 after Mateo allies challenged her petitions; Tirschwell subsequently endorsed Sliwa. Once friends, the primary race turned Sliwa and Mateo into bitter rivals. The Manhattan, Queens and Bronx Republican parties endorsed Mateo, while the Staten Island and Brooklyn Republican parties endorsed Sliwa. Sliwa criticized Mateo for donating to the 2017 re-election campaign of Mayor Bill de Blasio, a Democrat, and Sliwa also accused Mateo of breaking the law; Mateo replied that Sliwa's accusations were bogus and shameful.

During his campaign, Mateo and Sliwa clashed over loyalty to former president Donald Trump. Mateo espoused the belief that Trump won the 2020 presidential election; by contrast, Sliwa did not support Trump in either 2016 or 2020, and does not support Trump's election claims.

During the campaign, Mateo was criticized for the fact that he did not register to vote in New York City until October 2020, and that he mostly lives in suburban Westchester County. In response, he said, "I own an apartment in New York City. I live in that apartment in New York City whenever I want to."

On the evening of June 22, the Associated Press announced that Mateo had lost the Republican nomination to Sliwa.

== Personal life ==
Mateo lives in Irvington, New York, with his wife, Stella, and has three children. He also owns an apartment in Manhattan. His two daughters work as a doctor and a writer, respectively. His son, Fernando Mateo Jr., works at the New York City Sanitation Department, and is also an actor.

=== Business ventures ===
Mateo is involved in several different businesses. He is Vice President of San Mateo Construction and a partner at Penserra Securities. He also owns and operates Zona de Cuba, a Cuban restaurant in The Bronx.
