= Raja M. Flores =

American thoracic surgeon

Raja Michael Flores
- Education: Columbia University; New York University; Albert Einstein College of Medicine
- Medical career
- Profession: thoracic surgeon
- Institutions: Mount Sinai Hospital
- Research: cancer research

Raja Michael Flores is an American thoracic surgeon and former candidate for mayor of New York City, currently Chief of the Division of Thoracic Surgery at Mount Sinai Hospital and Ames Professor of Cardiothoracic Surgery at the Icahn School of Medicine at Mount Sinai, both in New York City. On March 20, 2021, Dr. Flores announced his campaign for mayor of NYC.

== Biography ==
Flores received a B.A. in biochemistry from New York University in 1988 and his M.D. from Albert Einstein College of Medicine in 1992. His internship (1992–1993) and residency (1993–1997) at Columbia-Presbyterian Medical Center were followed by a Thoracic Oncology Clinical Research Fellowship (1997–1998) in Intraoperative Chemotherapy, Mesothelioma and Lung Cancer at Brigham and Women's Hospital/Dana–Farber Cancer Institute, and a Cardiothoracic Surgery Residency (1998-2000) at Harvard Medical School, both in Boston, Massachusetts.

Flores is currently an editorial board member for the World Journal of Gastrointestinal Surgery, the World Journal of Gastrointestinal Edoscopy and the World Journal of Respirology. He is a reviewer for 13 other journals including Head & Neck, the Journal of Thoracic and Cardiovascular Surgery, the Journal of Thoracic Oncology and the Journal of Clinical Oncology. Memberships include the American College of Chest Physicians, the American College of Surgeons Oncology Group and the American Society of Clinical Oncology.

== Research ==
Flores' research has significantly impacted the surgical management of pleural mesothelioma by demonstrating that partial pleural membrane removal is as effective a treatment as lung removal. He was instrumental in creating VATS lobectomy as the standard in the surgical treatment of lung cancer and is considered a pioneer in the use of intraoperative chemotherapy for mesothelioma.

Flores is the author of more than 60 book chapters, reviews, monographs and abstracts and more than 150 publications. He serves as a reviewer for 13 journals and has been an editorial board member on four journals. He is the principal investigator on five clinical trials and has been ranked in the top 1% in his field by U.S. News & World Report.

Flores’ areas of interest include lung cancer screening, thoracoscopy, VATS lobectomy, extrapleural pneumonectomy for mesothelioma, asbestos, tracheal stenosis, carinal surgery and esophageal cancer surgery. He is the principal investigator for a clinical trial of neoadjuvant gemcitabine and cisplatin followed by extrapleural pneumonectomy and high-dose radiation.

Other research includes:

Role	Title	Affiliation
Co-Principal Investigator	Extrapleural Pneumonectomy Followed by Intrathoracic/Intraperitoneal Heated Cisplatin and Intravenous Sodium Thiosulfate in the Multimodality Treatment of Malignant Pleural Mesothelioma: A Phase I Study	Brigham & Women's Hospital
Principal Investigator	Randomized, Prospective Trial of Mediastinal LN Sampling Vs. Complete Lymphadenectomy During Conduct of Pulmonary Resection in Patients with N0 and N1 (less than hilar) non-small cell carcinoma (ACOSOG Z0030)	Memorial Sloan-Kettering Cancer Center
Principal Investigator	A Randomized Phase III Trial Surgery Alone or Surgery Plus Preoperative Paclitaxel/Carboplatin in Clinical Stage IB (T2N0), II (T1-2N1, T3N0) and selected IIIA None Small Cell Lung Cancer (NSCLC) – (RTOGL-0015 (S9900)	Memorial Sloan-Kettering Cancer Center
Principal Investigator	The Role of Laparoscopic Staging in Patients with Resectable Gastroesophageal Junction Carcinomas	Memorial Sloan-Kettering Cancer Center
Principal Investigator	A Phase II Trial of Induction Chemotherapy, Surgical Resection and Adjuvant External Beam Radiation for Locally Advanced Malignant Pleural Mesothelioma	Memorial Sloan-Kettering Cancer Center
Principal Investigator	A Phase II Trial of Induction Chemotherapy, Surgical Resection, and Adjuvant External Beam Radiation for Locally Advanced Malignant Pleural Mesothelioma	Lilly Research Laboratories

== Publications ==
Partial list:

- Flores, RM; Ihekweazu, UN; Rizk, NP; Dycoco, J; Bains, MS; Downey, RJ; Adusumilli, PS (Jan 2011). "Patterns of recurrence and incidence of second primary tumors after lobectomy by VATS versus thoracotomy for lung cancer". The Journal of Thoracic and Cardiovascular Surgery. 141 (1): 59–64. doi:10.1016/j.jtcvs.2010.08.062. PMID 21055770.
- Kaufman, AJ; Flores, RM (Jun 2011). "Surgical treatment of malignant pleural mesothelioma". Current Treatment Options in Oncology. 12 (2): 201–16. doi:10.1007/s11864-011-0154-4. PMID 21465419. S2CID 37667366.
- Flores, RM (Feb 2011). "Reply to difference in outcome in the transection of the pulmonary artery and vein". The Journal of Thoracic and Cardiovascular Surgery. 141 (2): 597–8. doi:10.1016/j.jtcvs.2010.10.008. PMID 21241869.
- Rai, AJ; Flores, RM (Jan 2011). "Association of malignant mesothelioma and asbestos related conditions with ovarian cancer: shared biomarkers and a possible etiological link?". Clinical Chemistry and Laboratory Medicine. 49 (1): 5–7. doi:10.1515/CCLM.2011.027. PMID 21158701. S2CID 13531838.
- Flores, RM; Ihekweazu, UN; Rizk, N; Dycoco, J; Bains, MS; Downey, RJ; Adusumilli, P; Finley, DJ; Huang, J; Rusch, VW; Sarkaria, I; Park, B (Jan 2011). "Patterns of recurrence and incidence of second primary tumors after lobectomy by means of video-assisted thoracoscopic surgery (VATS) versus thoracotomy for lung cancer". The Journal of Thoracic and Cardiovascular Surgery. 141 (1): 59–64. doi:10.1016/j.jtcvs.2010.08.062. PMID 21055770.
- Flores, RM; Riedel, E; Donington, JS; Alago, W; Ihekweazu, U; Krug, L; Rosenzweig, K; Adusumilli, PS; Carbone, M; Pass, HI (Oct 2010). "Frequency of use and predictors of cancer-directed surgery in the management of malignant pleural mesothelioma in a community-based (Surveillance, Epidemiology, and End Results [SEER]) population". Journal of Thoracic Oncology. 5 (10): 1649–54. doi:10.1097/JTO.0b013e3181f1903e. PMID 20871264.
- Ihekweazu, UN; Ludwig, E; Flores, RM (Aug 2010). "PillCam in gastric conduit after Ivor Lewis esophagectomy". The Annals of Thoracic Surgery. 90 (2): 673. doi:10.1016/j.athoracsur.2009.10.042. PMID 20667385.
- Abbey, AM; Flores, RM (Aug 2010). "Spontaneous resolution of a pericardial cyst". Annals of Thoracic and Cardiovascular Surgery. 16 (1): 55–6. PMID 20190713.
- Rai, AJ; Flores, RM; Mathew, A; Gonzalez-Espinoza, R; Bott, M; Ladanyi, M; Rusch, V; Fleisher, M (Feb 2010). "Soluble mesothelin related peptides (SMRP) and osteopontin as protein biomarkers for malignant mesothelioma: analytical validation of ELISA based assays and characterization at mRNA and protein levels". Clinical Chemistry and Laboratory Medicine. 48 (2): 271–8. doi:10.1515/CCLM.2010.066. PMID 20131968. S2CID 24558788.
- Flores, RM (Feb 2010). "Invited commentary". The Annals of Thoracic Surgery. 89 (2): 396. doi:10.1016/j.athoracsur.2009.11.040. PMID 20103307.
- Blasberg, JD; Pass, HI; Goparaju, CM; Flores, RM; Lee, S; Donington, JS (Feb 2010). "Reduction of elevated plasma osteopontin levels with resection of non-small-cell lung cancer". Journal of Clinical Oncology. 28 (6): 936–41. doi:10.1200/JCO.2009.25.5711. PMC 2834433. PMID 20085934.
- Flores, RM (Apr 2010). "Video-assisted thoracic surgery (VATS) lobectomy: focus on technique". World Journal of Surgery. 34 (4): 616–20. doi:10.1007/s00268-009-0340-8. PMID 20082195. S2CID 31348899.
- Blasberg, JD; Pass, HI; Goparaju, CMV; Flores, RM; Lee, S.; Donington, JS. (Feb 2010). "Reduction of elevated plasma osteopontin levels with resection of non-small cell lung cancer". Journal of Clinical Oncology. 28 (6): 936–41. doi:10.1200/JCO.2009.25.5711. PMC 2834433. PMID 20085934.
- Flores, RM (Apr 2010). "Video-assisted thoracic surgery (VATS) lobectomy: focus on technique". World Journal of Surgery. 34 (4): 616–20. doi:10.1007/s00268-009-0340-8. PMID 20082195. S2CID 31348899.
- Flores, RM; Riedel, E; Donington, JS; Alago, W; Ihekweazu, U; Krug, L; Rosenzweig, K; Adusumilli, PS; Carbone, M; Pass, HI (Oct 2010). "Frequency of use and predictors of cancer directed surgery in the management of malignant pleural mesothelioma in a community-based (SEER) population". Journal of Thoracic Oncology. 5 (10): 1649–1654. doi:10.1097/JTO.0b013e3181f1903e. PMID 20871264.
- Flores, RM (Summer 2009). "Surgical options in malignant pleural mesothelioma: extrapleural pneumonectomy or pleurectomy/decortication". Seminars in Thoracic and Cardiovascular Surgery. 21 (2): 149–53. doi:10.1053/j.semtcvs.2009.06.008. PMID 19822286.
- Flores, RM; Park, BJ; Dycoco, J; Aronova, A; Hirth, Y; Rizk, NP; Bains, M; Downey, RJ; Rusch, VW (2009). "Lobectomy by video-assisted thoracic surgery (VATS) versus thoracotomy for lung cancer". The Journal of Thoracic and Cardiovascular Surgery. 138 (1): 11–18. doi:10.1016/j.jtcvs.2009.03.030. PMID 19577048.
- Flores, RM; Park, BJ; Dycoco, J; Aronova, A; Hirth, Y; Rizk, NP; Bains, M; Downey, RJ; Rusch, VW (Jul 2009). "Lobectomy by video-assisted thoracic surgery (VATS) versus thoracotomy for lung cancer". The Journal of Thoracic and Cardiovascular Surgery. 138 (1): 11–8. doi:10.1016/j.jtcvs.2009.03.030. PMID 19577048.
- Flores, Raja M.; Pass, Harvey I.; Seshan, Venkatraman E.; Dycoco, Joseph; Zakowski, Maureen; Carbone, Michele; Bains, Manjit S.; Rusch, Valerie W. (2008). "Extrapleural pneumonectomy versus pleurectomy/Decortication in the surgical management of malignant pleural mesothelioma: Results in 663 patients". The Journal of Thoracic and Cardiovascular Surgery. 135 (3): 620–626.e3. doi:10.1016/j.jtcvs.2007.10.054. PMID 18329481.
- Garcia, A; Flores, RM (2008). "Surgical Management of tumors invading the superior vena cava". The Annals of Thoracic Surgery. 85 (6): 2144–6. doi:10.1016/j.athoracsur.2007.12.027. PMID 18498851.
- Flores, RM; Routledge, T; Venkatraman, E; Dycoco, J; Hirth, Y; Rusch, VW (Sep 2008). "The impact of lymph node station on survival in 348 patients with surgically resected malignant pleural mesothelioma (MPM): implications for revision of the AJCC staging system". The Journal of Thoracic and Cardiovascular Surgery. 136 (3): 605–610. doi:10.1016/j.jtcvs.2008.02.069. PMID 18805259.
- Garcia, A; Byrne, JG; Bueno, R; Flores, RM (Dec 2008). "Aneurysm of the main pulmonary artery". Annals of Thoracic and Cardiovascular Surgery. 14 (6): 399–401. PMID 19131930.
- Flores, RM; Zakowski, M; Venkatraman, E; Krug, L; Rosenzweig, K; Dycoco, J; Lee, C; Yeoh, C; Bains, M; Rusch, VW (2007). "Prognostic Factors in the Treatment of Malignant Pleural Mesothelioma (MPM) at a Large Tertiary Referral Center". Journal of Thoracic Oncology. 2 (10): 957–65. doi:10.1097/JTO.0b013e31815608d9. PMID 17909360.
- Flores, RM; Krug, LM; Rosenzweig, KE; Venkatraman, E; Vincent, A; Heelan, R; Akhurst, T; Rusch, VW (May 2006). "Induction chemotherapy, extrapleural pneumonectomy, and postoperative high dose radiotherapy for locally advanced malignant pleural mesothelioma. A phase II trial". Journal of Thoracic Oncology. 1 (4): 289–95. doi:10.1097/01243894-200605000-00004. PMID 17409872.
- Flores, RM; Alam, N (2006). "Treatment of malignant pleural mesothelioma: pleurectomy with adjuvant therapy". Operative Techniques in Thoracic and Cardiovascular Surgery. 11 (1): 57–74. doi:10.1053/j.optechstcvs.2006.02.002.
- Flores, RM; Akhurst, T; Gonen, M; Zakowski, M; Dycocco, J; Larsen, SM; Rusch, VW (2006). "Positron emission tomography predicts survival in malignant pleural mesothelioma". The Journal of Thoracic and Cardiovascular Surgery. 132 (4): 763–8. doi:10.1016/j.jtcvs.2006.03.068. PMID 17000285.
- Flores, RM; Su, W; Lal, D; Rusch, VW; LaQuaglia, MP (2006). "Extrapleural pneumonectomy in children". Journal of Pediatric Surgery. 41 (10): 1738–42. doi:10.1016/j.jpedsurg.2006.05.063. PMID 17011280.
- Sugarbaker, D. J.; Flores, R. M.; Jaklitsch, M. T.; Richards, W. G.; Strauss, G. M.; Corson, J. M.; Decamp Jr, M. M.; Swanson, S. J.; Bueno, R.; Lukanich, J. M.; Baldini, E. H.; Mentzer, S. J. (1999). "Resection margins, extrapleural nodal status, and cell type determine postoperative long-term survival in trimodality therapy of malignant pleural mesothelioma: Results in 183 patients". The Journal of Thoracic and Cardiovascular Surgery. 117 (1): 54–63, discussion 63–5. doi:10.1016/s0022-5223(99)70469-1. PMID 9869758.
