= New York City waste management system =

New York City's refuse removal system

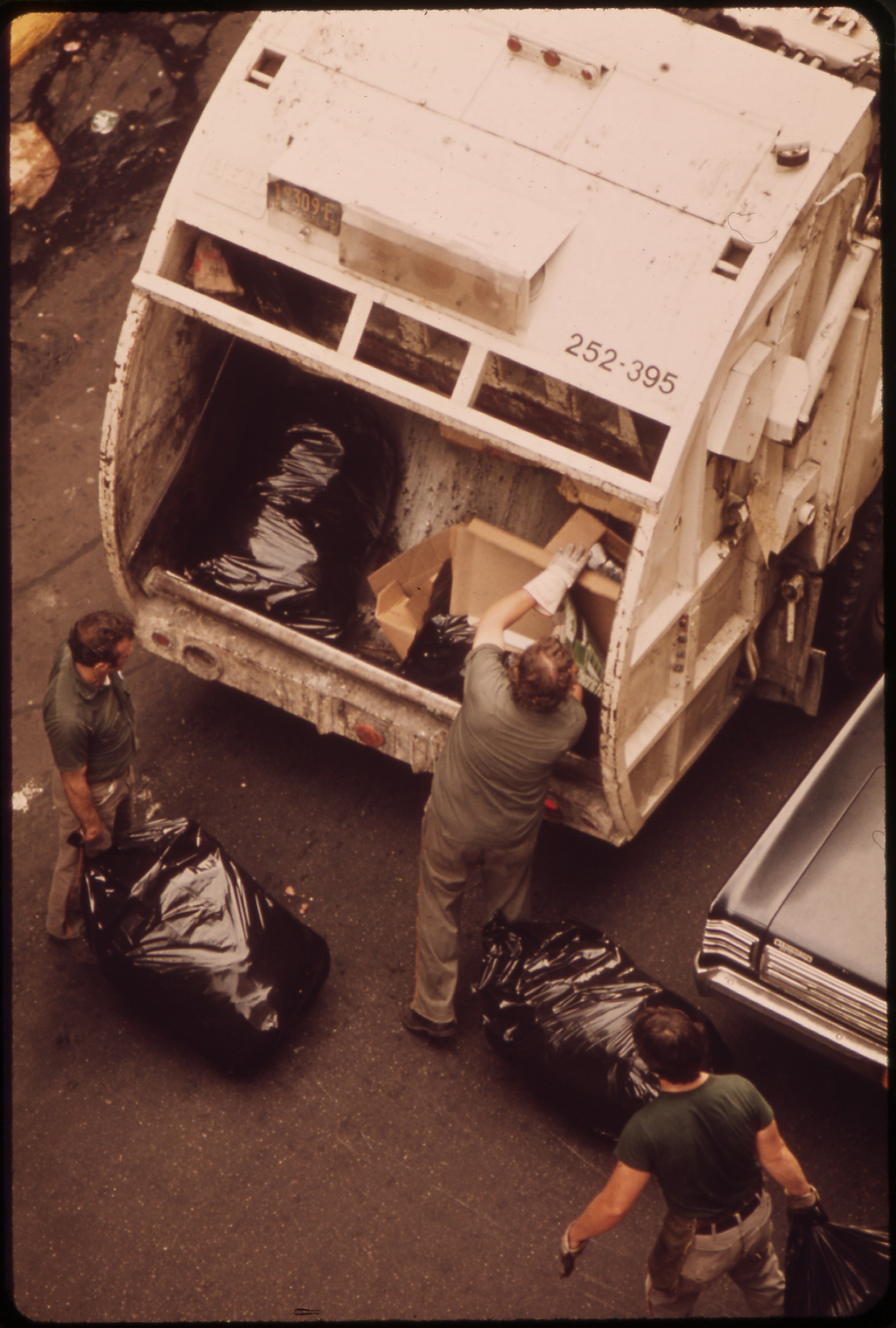
New York City Department of Sanitation (DSNY) workers collecting garbage on 172nd Street in Manhattan in 1973

New York City's waste management system is a refuse removal system primarily run by the New York City Department of Sanitation (DSNY). The department maintains the waste collection infrastructure and hires public and private contractors who remove the city's waste. For the city's population of more than eight million, The DSNY collects approximately eleven thousand tons a day of garbage, including compostable material and recycling. For residential waste that do not get composted or recycled, items disposed in black bins travel an average of 412 miles one-way to landfill and incineration facilities.

Waste management has been an issue for New York City since its New Amsterdam days. As a 1657 New Amsterdam ordinance states, "It has been found, that within this City of Amsterdam in New Netherland many burghers and inhabitants throw their rubbish, filth, ashes, dead animals and suchlike things into the public streets to the great inconvenience of the community".

== Collection ==
=== Curbside pickup ===
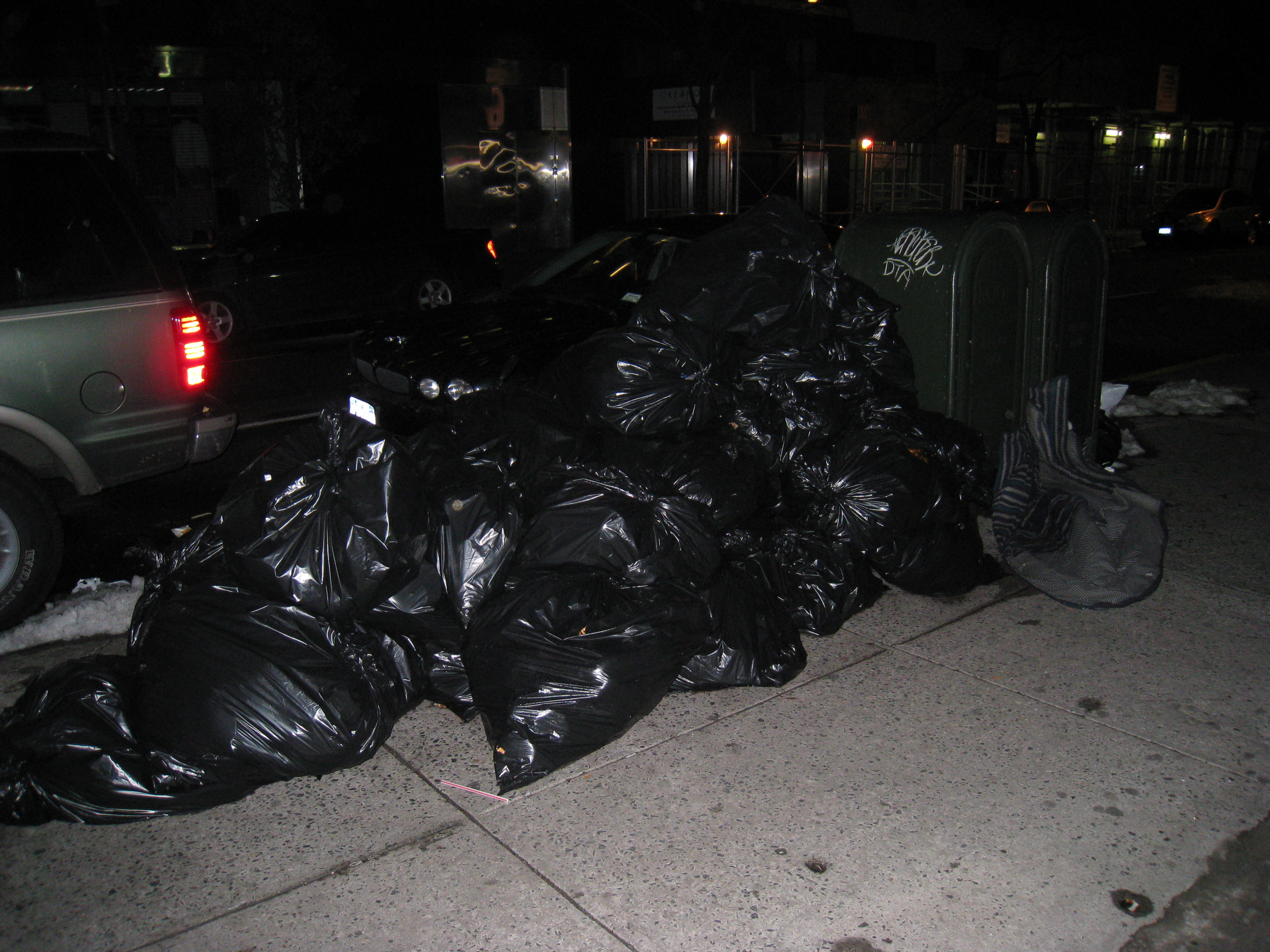
A pile of trash bags placed curbside for collection

DSNY provides curbside pickup of trash and recycling multiple times per week for every residential building in the city. Trash must be placed in black bags and recycling in clear or blue bags. This leads to complaints about the sidewalk space taken up by trash, especially as large residential buildings produce 'trash bag mountains' daily. Some buildings do place their garbage in special containers.

=== Commercial carting ===
Businesses are not served by the Department of Sanitation and instead are required to purchase waste collection service from a private hauler. The city's private carting industry has a long history of being controlled by the American Mafia, with a 1996 indictment of several firms resulting in the creation of the New York City Business Integrity Commission. In 2003, commercial carting accounted for 7,248 tons of solid waste, 2,641 tons of recycling, 8,626 tons of construction and demolition waste, and 19,069 tons of clean fill per day.

=== Litter baskets ===
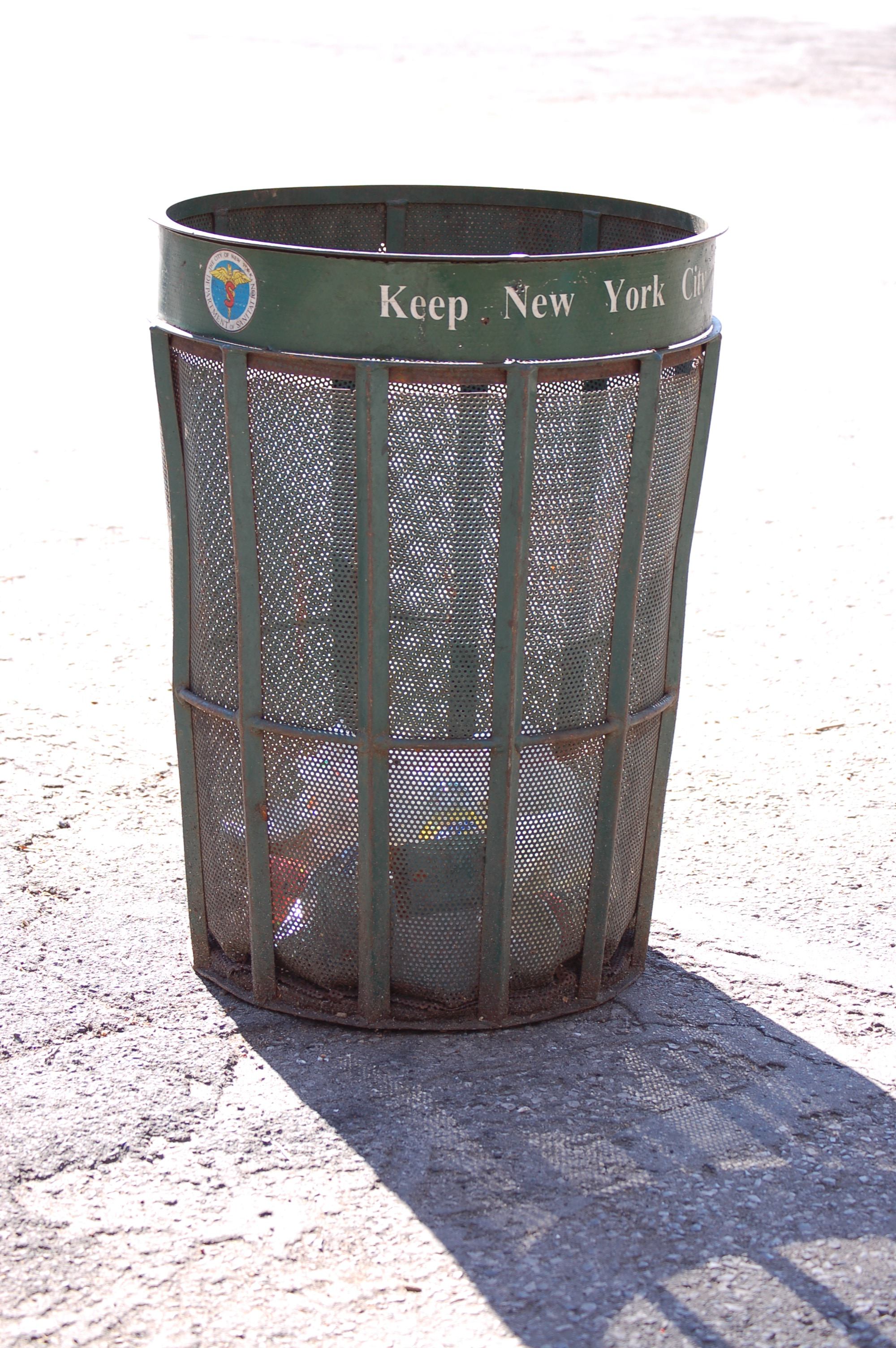
A New York City litter basket

DSNY collects litter from litter baskets placed on street corners in commercial areas throughout the city. Misuse of the litter baskets for household or business waste carries a fine, and often when this occurs the basket is removed.

In some business improvement districts, litter baskets are handled by the district sponsor or its contractors, with many contracting this work to The Doe Fund, which employs homeless men while providing housing, educational opportunities, counseling, and career training.

=== Street cleaning ===
In the 1890s, New York City implemented a street cleaning program that picked up after the large amounts of litter in the streets, as well as cleaning up after the city's horse-powered transportation. In 1895, New York City became the first U.S. city with public-sector garbage management. Sanitation engineer George E. Waring Jr. organized the "white wings" to clean the streets.

DSNY's street sweepers collect more than 100 tons of dust, dirt, and litter from the streets each day. Commercial streets which do not permit overnight parking are swept at night or in the early morning, while on residential streets car owners must move their cars once or twice a week for alternate-side parking to permit each side of the street to be swept.

Property owners are required to clean sidewalks as well as streets within 18 inches of the curb.

As of 2020, excessive littering remains an issue in all boroughs of NYC, especially Brooklyn, the Bronx, and Queens.

== Recycling ==
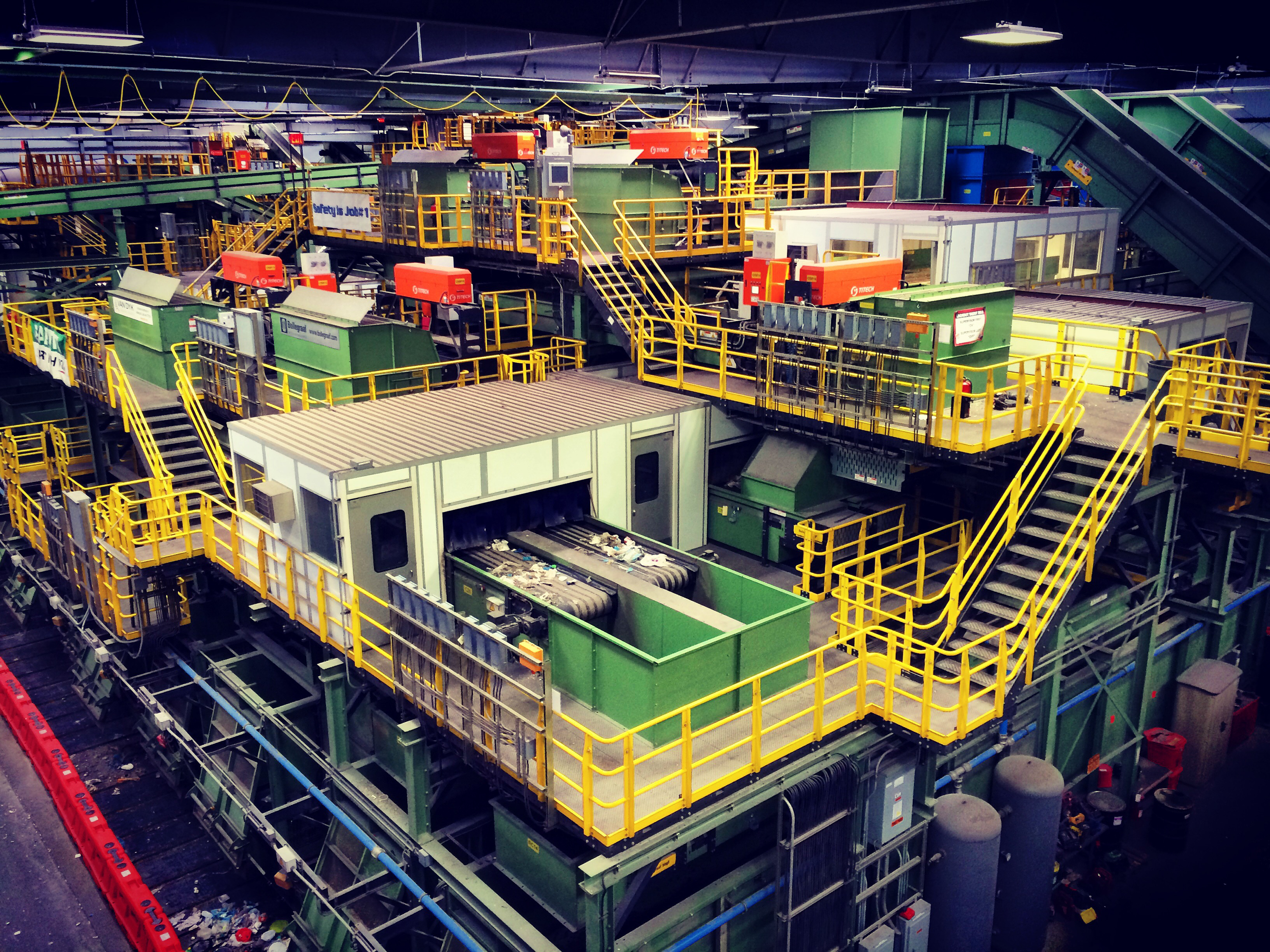
Machines inside the Sunset Park Material Recovery Facility

New York City began mandatory curbside recycling in the late 1980s. Most of NYC's (and Jersey City's) residential green bin and blue bin recycling travels to Sunset Park Material Recovery Facility (MRF) located in Brooklyn. This facility uses state-of-the-art technology and is considered to be one of the most sophisticated in the continent.

=== Container deposit ===
New York City is a hotbed of canning activity largely due to the city's high population density mixed with New York State's container deposit laws. Canning remains a contentious issue in NYC with the canners often facing pushback from the city government, the New York City Department of Sanitation, and other recycling collection companies. Sure We Can, a redemption center co-founded by nun Ana Martinez de Luco, is the only canner friendly redemption center in the city, providing lockers and communal space for the canners to sort their collections of redeemables.

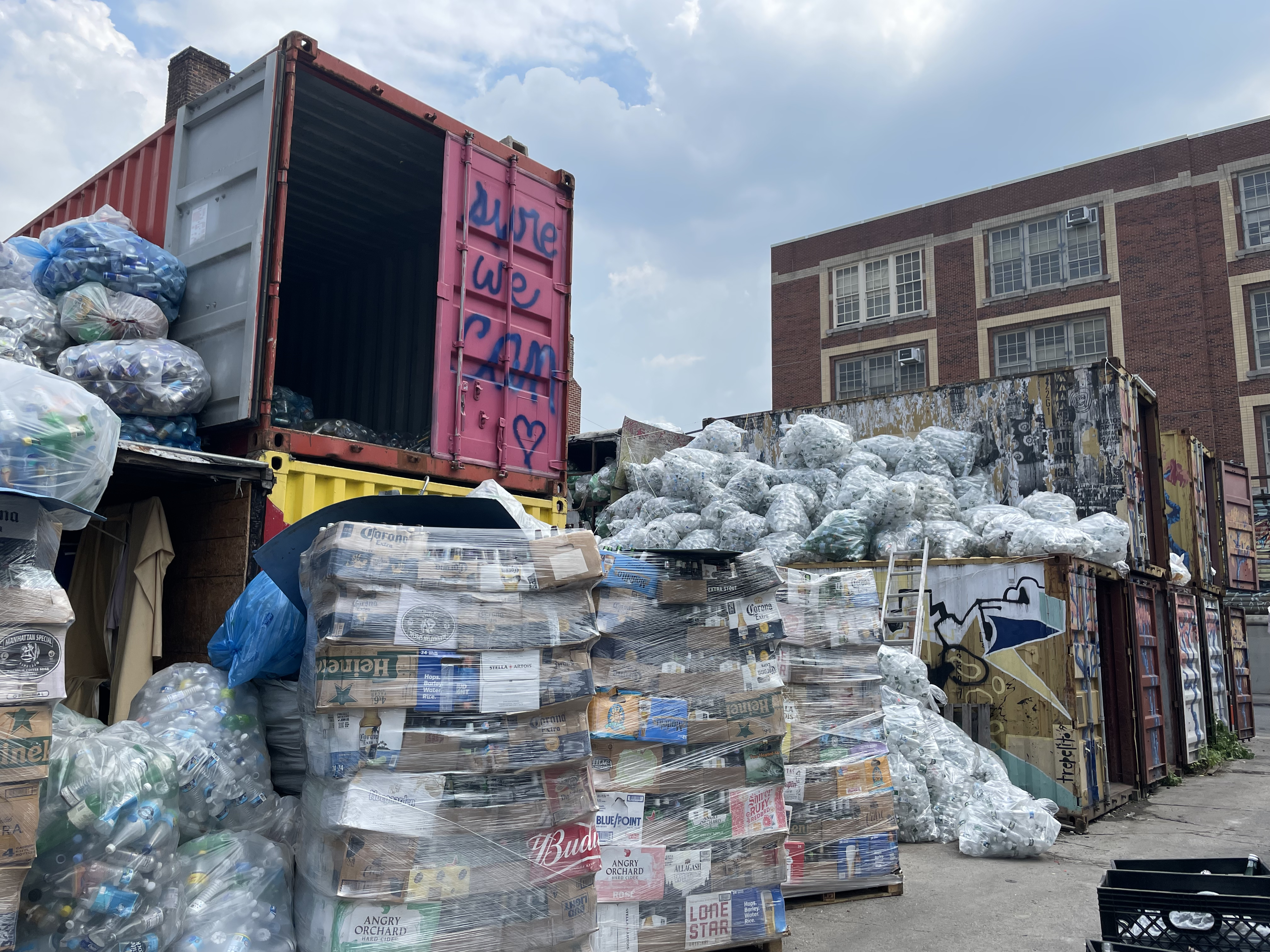
NYC recyclables, separated by type and manufacturer, awaiting pickup at container deposit redemption center Sure We Can

=== Paper ===
Roughly half of the paper and cardboard collected by DSNY is placed on barges at the West 59th Street Marine Transfer Station and taken to a Pratt Industries paper mill on Staten Island where it is recycled into new paper products.

=== Metal, glass, and plastic ===
Metal, glass, plastic, and cartons collected citywide are taken to the Sunset Park Material Recovery Facility in Brooklyn. Recyclables from the Bronx and Queens are taken there by barge. There the recyclables are sorted by eddy current separators and optical scanners, then baled for sale. Clear glass is sold to bottlers and colored glass is sold as construction aggregate. Roughly 15% of material entering the facility ends up in a landfill, either because it cannot be separated or is not economically recyclable.

== Composting ==
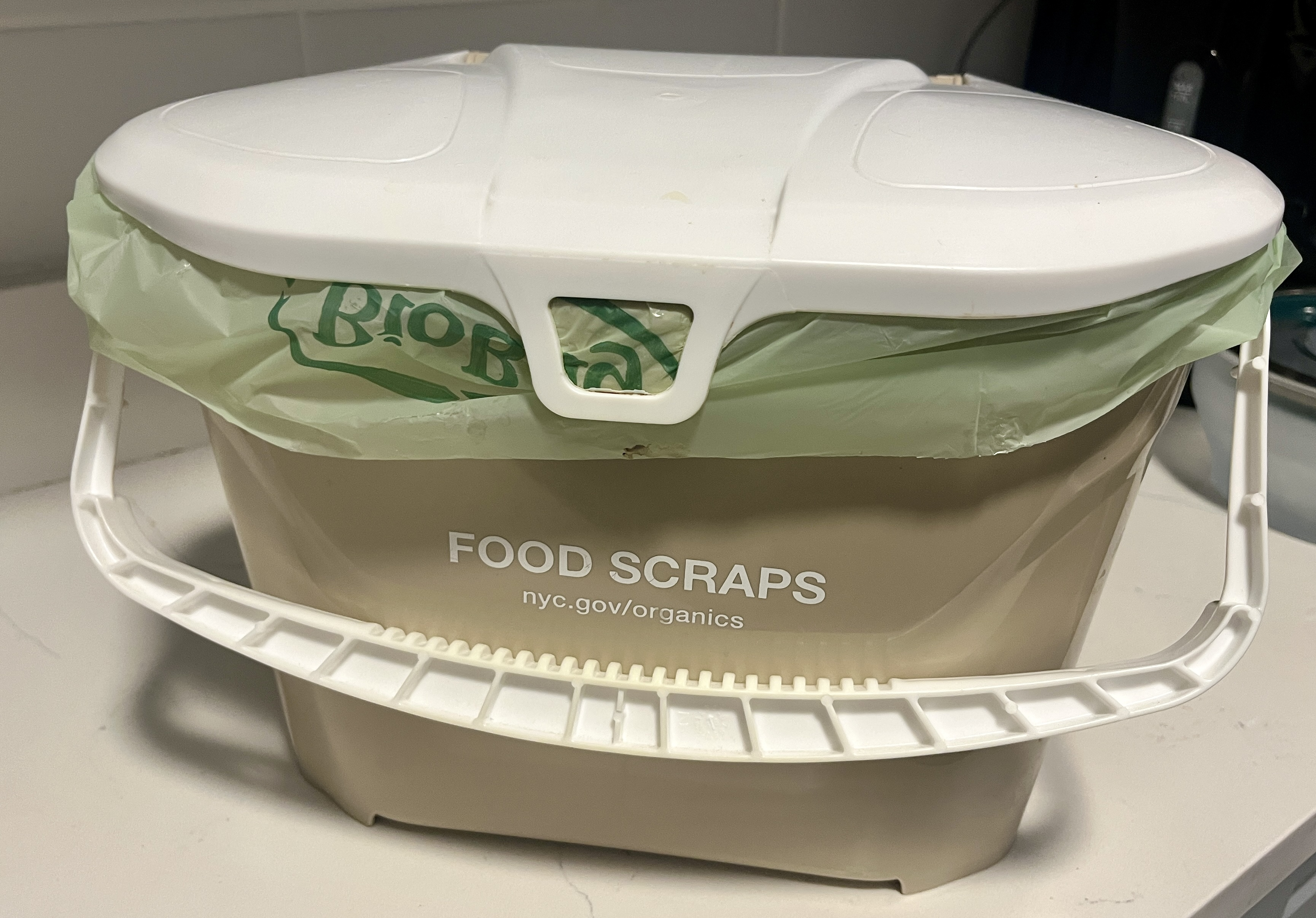
Household compost bin distributed by DSNY

New York City first began composting in the borough of Staten Island in 2012. The program was instituted by then-mayor Michael Bloomberg. By 2017, the program had expanded to include 300,000 households, 722 schools, agencies, and institutions, and 80 drop-off points, across the city. In 2019 the city collected 50,000 tons of compostables from curbside service. In 2020, citing budget cuts related to the COVID-19 pandemic, New York City suspended its curbside composting and organics recycling for schools. Through the effort of a community coalition called "Save Our Compost," enough funds were retained in the city budget to allow four community-scale composting sites to remain open. The city also created an interactive map to show all publicly available composting sites.

In 2021, city-funded composting in New York City remains tenuous. The New York City Parks Department has made efforts to relocate two of the remaining composting sites on Parks-managed land, currently operated by Big Reuse and the LES Ecology Center, raising concerns among composting advocates.

In 2024, New York City is expanding its curbside composting program across all boroughs to reduce organic waste and generate compost or biogas. The program launched in phases, starting with Queens, which piloted the initiative successfully. Brooklyn began full curbside composting on October 2, 2023, with the Bronx and Staten Island following in March 2024. Manhattan's rollout is scheduled for October 7, 2024.

The initiative aims to mirror the success of mandatory composting programs in cities like San Francisco by emphasizing participation over penalties. While fines for non-compliance won't start until March 2025, education efforts are underway to ensure residents understand the benefits and logistics of composting before enforcement begins.

In 2025, the NYC Community Compost Network restored the Master Compost Certificate Course which combines workshops, field trips, and volunteer opportunities through community composting organizations around the five boroughs of NYC. The program is funded by the New York City Council.

As of April 1, 2025 composting has become mandatory in all of NYC. Failing to separate leaf/yard waste and food scraps incurs escalating fines depending on the number of offenses and the size of the building.

== Disposal ==
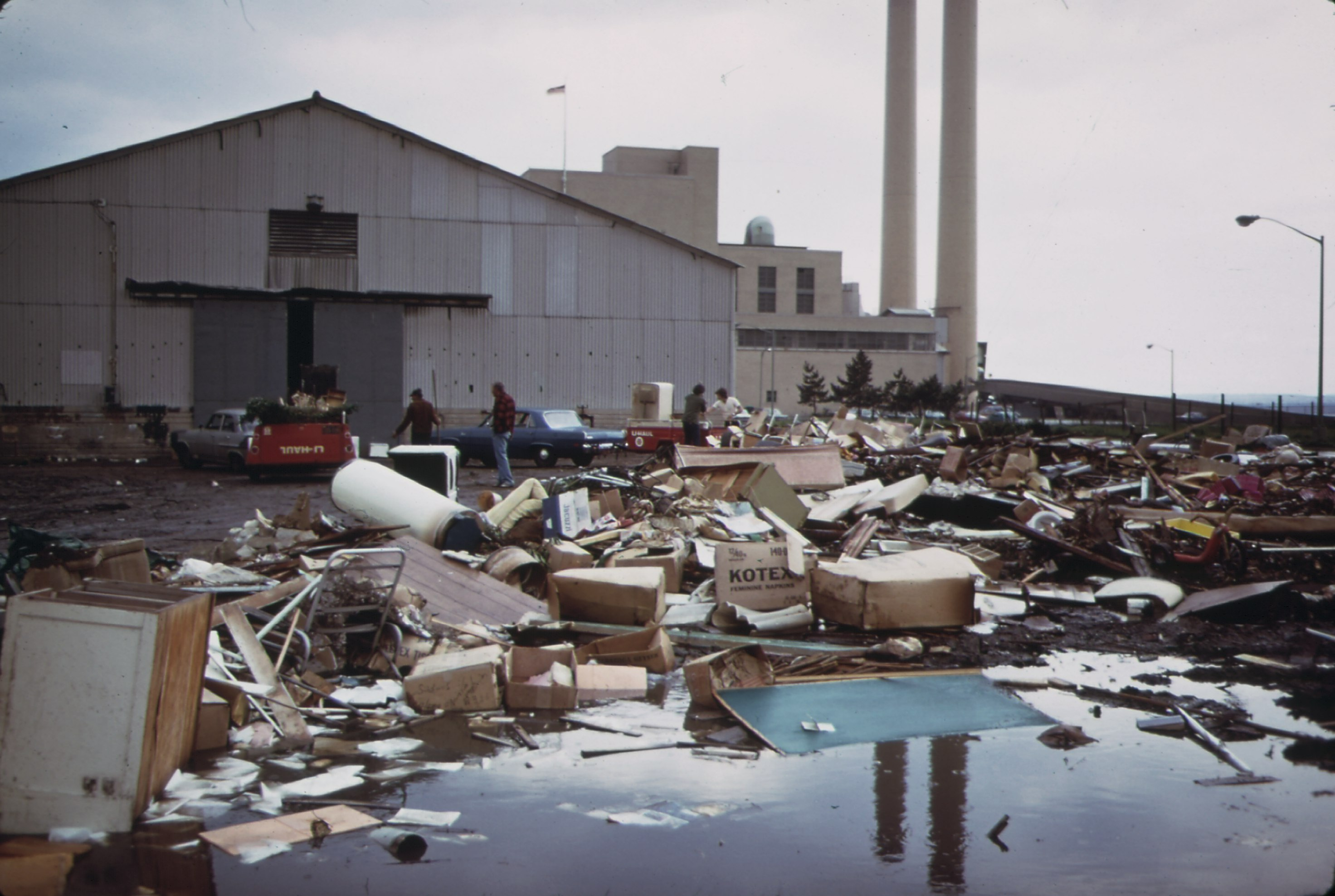
Household trash, dumped in front of NYC incinerator at Gravesend Bay

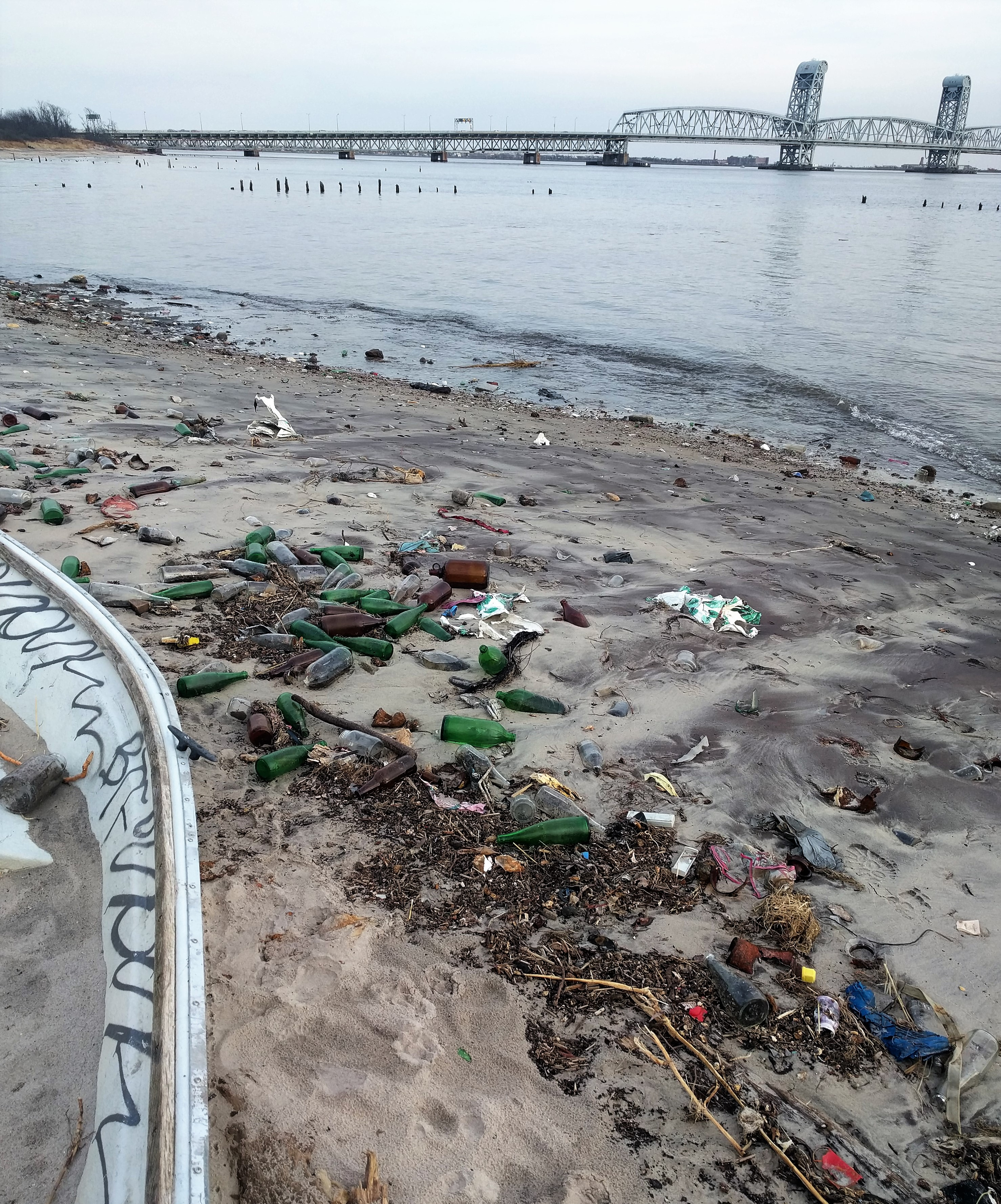
Bottle Beach, on Dead Horse Bay

In the 1930s the city ended the practice of ocean dumping of trash, instead incinerating the trash at 11 municipal incinerators and dumping the resulting ash in landfills scattered across the five boroughs.

=== Trash incineration ===
In 1885, New York City opened the nation's first trash incinerator on Governors Island. Until the 1960s, eleven unfiltered trash incinerators operated in NYC, burning garbage without regulation. The last municipal incinerators in the city closed in the 1990s.

Currently, trash from Manhattan is sent to the Essex County Resource Recovery Facility, a waste-to-energy incineration power station. Ash from the incinerator is sent to landfills, after recoverable metal is extracted.

=== Landfills ===
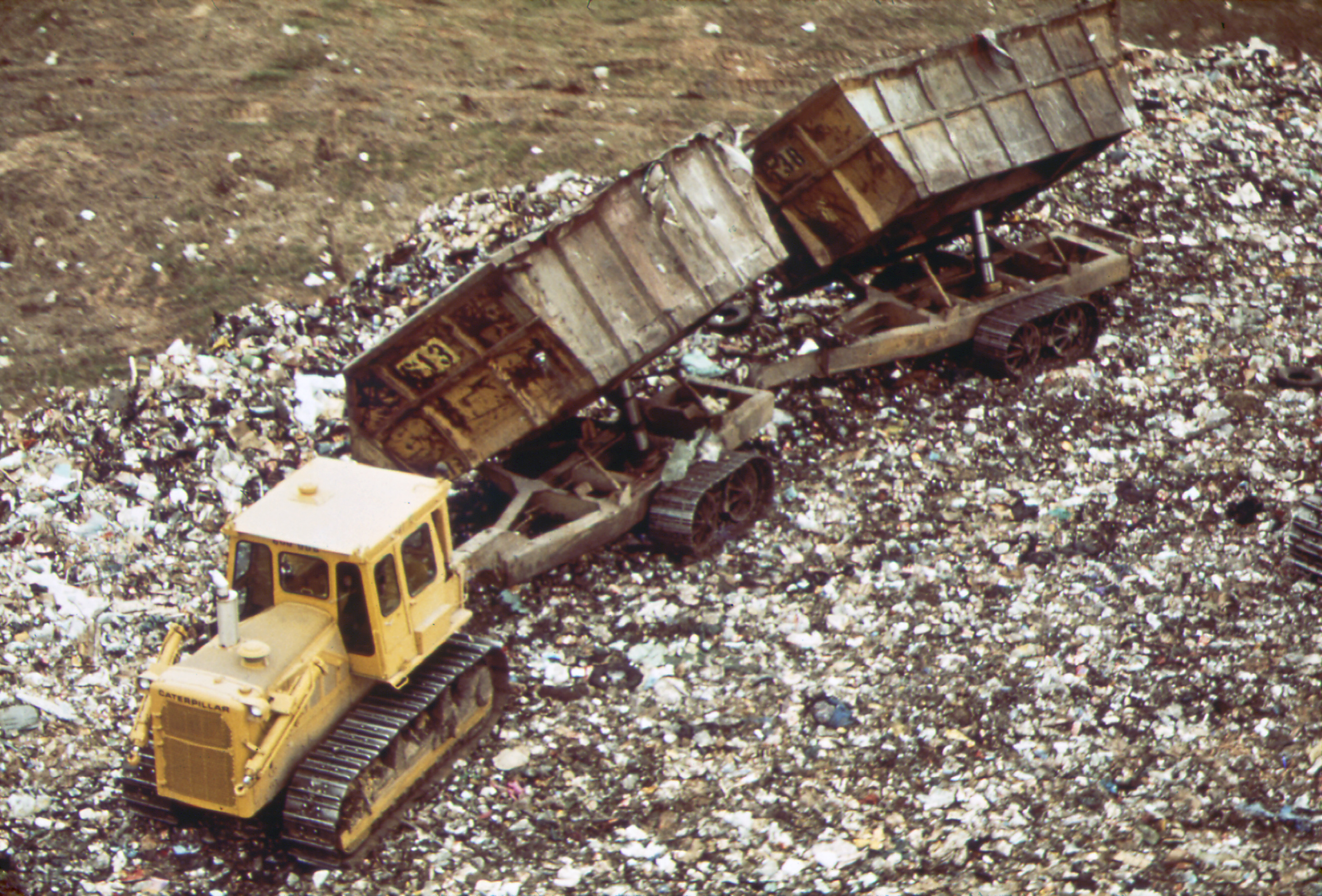
Fresh Kills Landfill (1948-2001) was a dumping site part of NYC's waste management system located on the west shore of Staten Island

In the 18th and 19th centuries, New York residents were encouraged to throw their trash into the East River to shore up low-lying sections of Lower Manhattan. In the 1950s and 1960s, city planner Robert Moses encouraged residents to dump their trash to fill numerous swamps and rivers around the city to make them more hospitable to development for parkland, fairgrounds, and airports. Examples include Pelham Bay Park and Flushing Meadows Park. At the height of its use, Staten Island's Fresh Kills landfill was the largest dump in the world, sprawling across 2,200 acres. Fresh Kills first opened in 1948 as a temporary landfill and closed in 2001. Starting in the late 20th century, NYC is making an effort to turn old landfill sites into parks. Notable examples of this are Freshkills Park in Staten Island and Shirley Chisholm State Park in Brooklyn. Most of NYC's waste ends up in landfills outside of the city. In 2017, the DSNY disposed of 3.2 million tons of refuse to facilities outside of New York City.

=== Waste export ===
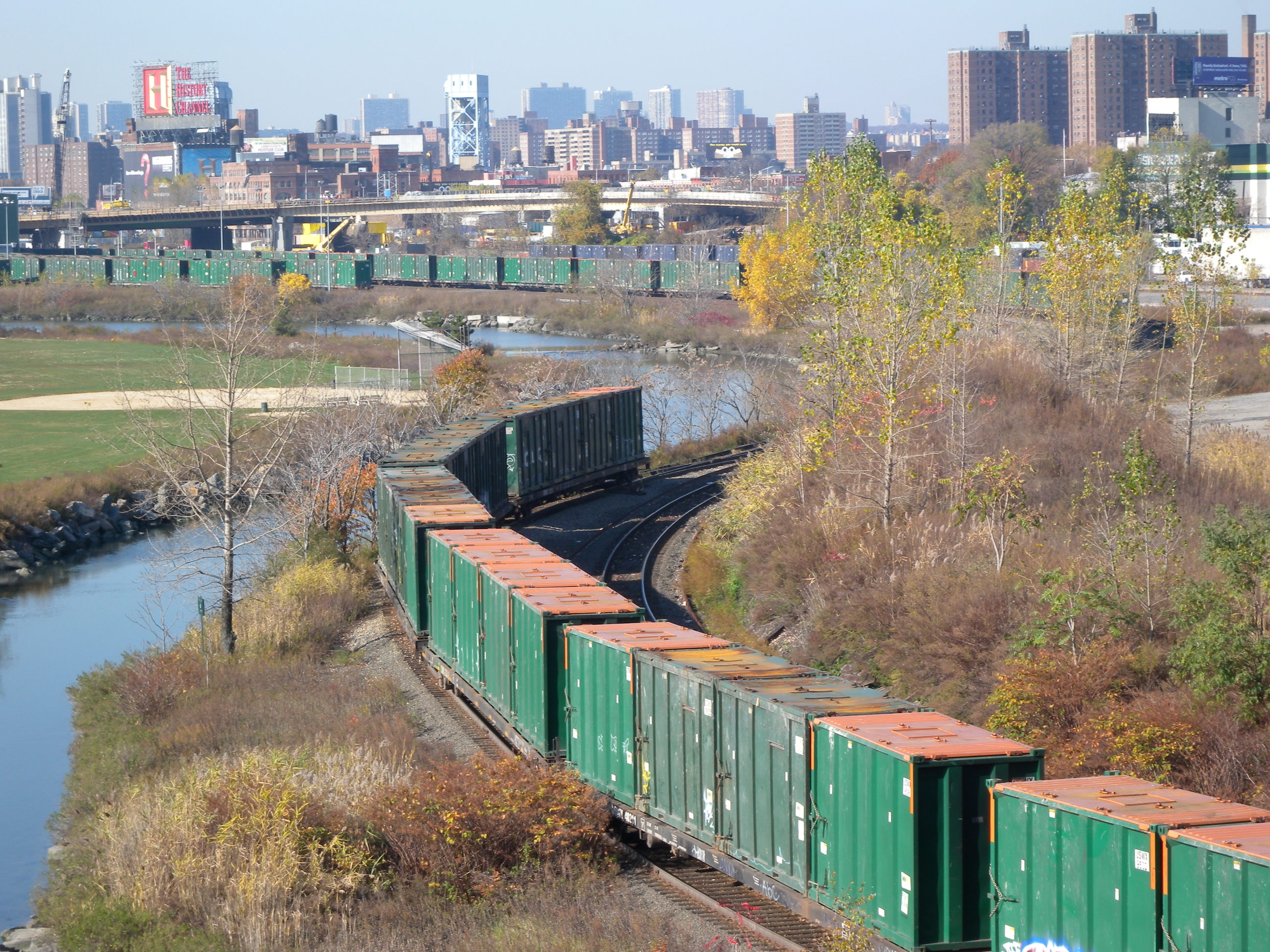
A train of green municipal solid waste containers on the Oak Point Link in the Bronx

Since the city of New York's last municipal incinerator closed in 1990 and last municipal landfill closed in 2001 all of the city's trash has been exported to landfills and incinerators far outside the city. Trash is placed in containers at one of the three marine transfer stations, the containers are taken by barge to the Staten Island waste transfer station and placed on trains bound for landfills and incinerators outside the city.

== Sewage ==
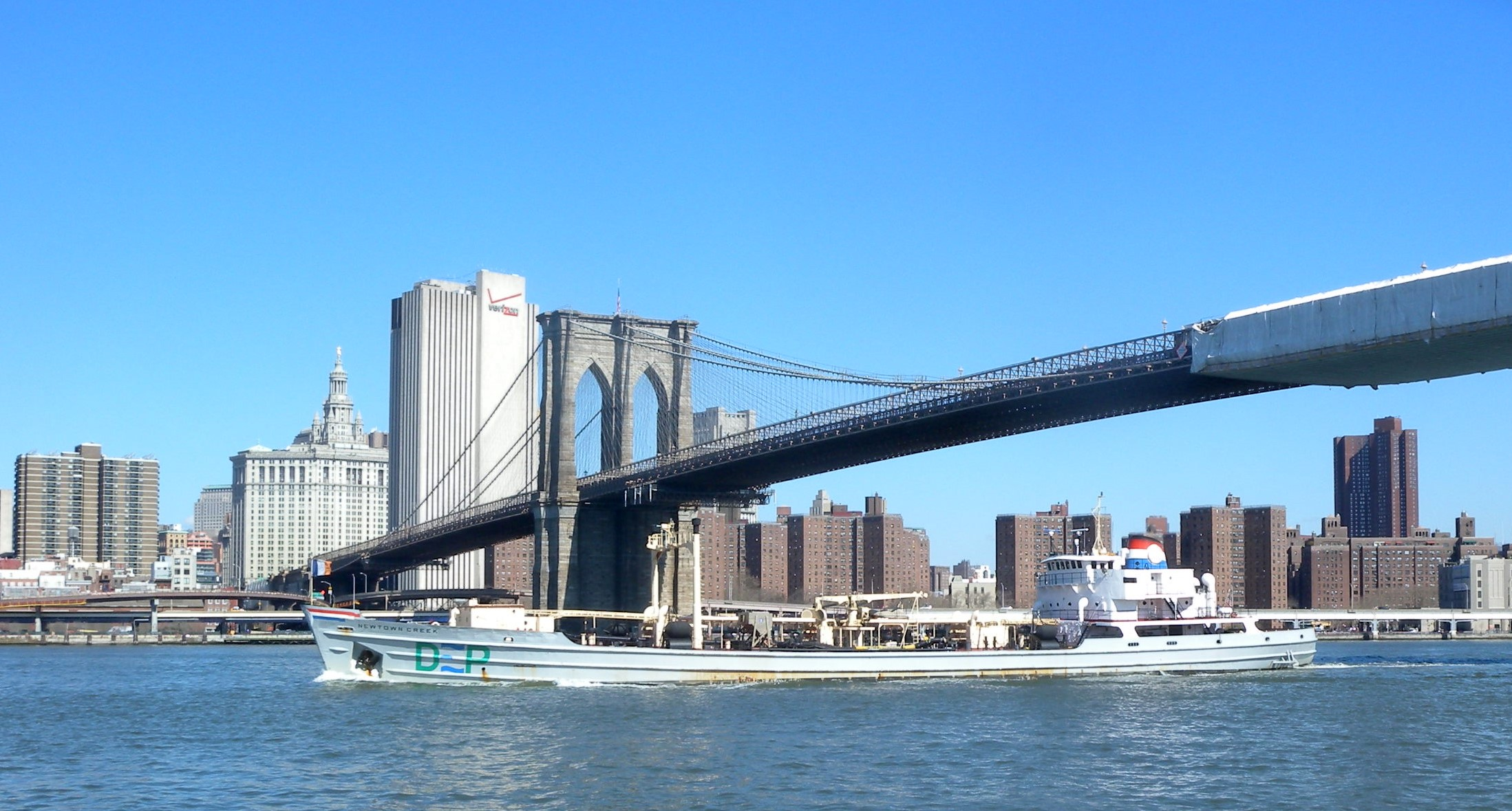
One of the NYC DEP ships carrying sewage sludge

New York City's sewage system carries more than 1,000 tons of solids (including leaves, dirt, and fecal matter) per day to 17 wastewater treatment plants, where the majority of the liquid waste is extracted, treated, and discharged into the waterways. The remaining sewage sludge is then carried on a sludge ship to the Wards Island Water Pollution Control Plant on Randalls Island. There the sludge is dewatered and the remaining solids are placed in sealed containers which are taken to landfills far from the city.

== See also ==
- Delaware Valley Resource Recovery Facility
- Essex County Resource Recovery Facility
- South Brooklyn Marine Terminal
