= SFCC =

SFCC is an acronym for:

== Colleges ==
- St. Francis' Canossian College, in Wan Chai, Hong Kong
- Santa Fe College, in Gainesville, Florida, U.S. (formerly Santa Fe Community College)
- Santa Fe Community College, in Santa Fe, New Mexico, U.S.
- Spokane Falls Community College, in Spokane, Washington, U.S.
- State Fair Community College in Sedalia, Missouri, U.S.

== Other uses ==
- Salesforce B2C Commerce Cloud, an Ecommerce platform formerly known as Demandware
- Sisters for Christian Community
