= Belle Hunt Shortridge =

American author

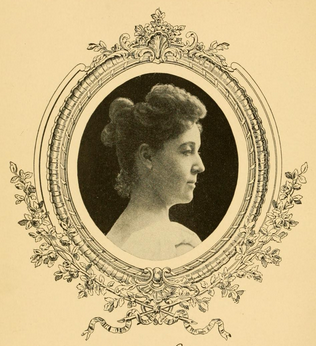
- Born: Belle Hunt; 1858; Cactus Hill, Wise County, Texas, U.S.
- Died: November 24, 1893 (aged 34-35); New York City, New York, U.S.
- Resting place: Cactus Hill, Wise County, Texas, U.S.
- Occupation: Author
- Spouse: Samuel A. Shortridge
- Writing career
- Language: English
- Genres: poetry, novels, short stories, juvenile literature
- Notable works: Lone Star Lights, Held in Trust, Circumstance

Belle Hunt Shortridge (née, Hunt; 1858 – November 24, 1893) was an American writer of poetry, novels, short stories, and juvenile literature. She was the first person of European descent to be born in Wise County, Texas. She was a versatile and prolific writer, when the brief time allotted to her is considered. She published a volume of poems entitled Lone Star Lights (1890), two novels, Held in Trust (1892) and Circumstance (1893), and numerous short stories and sketches. Shortridge died in 1893.

== Early years and education ==
Belle Hunt was born in 1858, at Cactus Hill, Texas, near Decatur, Texas. She was the first child of European ancestry born in Wise County. She was the daughter of William Hudson Hunt, a pioneer of the Republic of Texas, who was commissioned and served as lieutenant-colonel in the Mexican–American War, and was appointed government surveyor. Later, he was widely known as locator of lands, and as a progressive citizen of the State of Texas. He was descended from the Northampton line of Hunts, England. Belle Hunt inherited from this distinguished lineage the artistic and literary talent that brought her into general and favorable notice as a poet and author.

Orphaned in early childhood, she was reared by her guardian, Sylvanus Reed, of Bonham, Texas, where at Carleton College, she attended school until she entered the Visitation Academy of St. Louis, from which institution she was graduated with first honors at seventeen years of age.

== Career ==
Shortly after completing her education, she married Capt. Samuel A. Shortridge (1837–1908), of St. Louis, from which city they removed to Fort Worth, Texas, and finally made a permanent home in Terrell, Texas.

With laudable ambition, she went to New York City (1890) in the interest of her literary career. In a remarkably short period of time, her articles were accepted and published by the leading papers, journals and magazines of the city. There, she was at home in the parlors of Miriam Leslie, Ella Wheeler Wilcox, and other literati. She was fond of nature, and this passion breathes out in her lyrics and prose as well. Lone Star Lights (1891) was her first volume of poems. The dedication of this little volume was widely copied, and was made the subject of fifty watercolors by a woman of Dallas. The poem, "Peach Blossom Time," in the same volume, was set to music and published by her friend, Mrs. George W. Voiers, of Forney, Texas. It was James Gordon Bennett who said of this poem: "Nothing more exquisite is to be found in the English language."

Dispassionate critics pronounced her first novel, Held in Trust (1892), as a pleasing story—fresh, clean and sweet as a breeze from a Texas prairie. Her second novel, Circumstance (1892), was set in Austin, Texas. Her short stories appeared in Frank Leslie's Illustrated Newspaper, in the North American Review, the New York World, and other leading periodicals. Shortridge wrote especially well for children, her "Jingles" (Modern Mother Goose) attracted wide attention in the columns of the Sunday World.

== Personal life and legacy ==
She died November 24, 1893, in New York City, and was interred in the family burying ground at Cactus Hill, Wise County, which is now submerged under Lake Bridgeport. A memoir of Shortridge was in preparation—a sort of autobiographical sketch of her literary work and mechanical methods, compiled from her journals and letters, by her sister, Mrs. Kate Hunt Craddock.
