= D. Bruce Hanes =

American lawyer

D. Bruce Hanes is an American elected official, serving as the Register of Wills in Montgomery County, Pennsylvania. Hanes was elected to his current office in 2007 and was re-elected in 2011, 2015, and 2019.

== Issuance of Same-sex Marriage Licenses ==
On July 23, 2013, Hanes announced that his office would issue marriage licenses to same-sex couples. On September 12, 2013, Judge Dan Pellegrini issued an order to cease the issuance of marriage licenses to same-sex couples in Pennsylvania.

Because of his public support of same-sex marriage, Hanes was removed from his volunteer position at Little Flower Catholic High School for Girls, effective September 17, 2013.

In late May 2014, the Commonwealth of Pennsylvania dropped its case against Hanes, as the law Hanes was accused of having violated was deemed unconstitutional. A federal district court essentially vindicated Hanes's stance that the state law discriminating against same-sex couples was unconstitutional. On May 28, 2014, Montgomery County resumed issuing marriage licences to same-sex couples.

== See also ==
- Recognition of same-sex unions in Pennsylvania
