= Visitation Academy of St. Louis =

Private high school in Town and Country, Missouri, US

Location
- 3020 North Ballas Road; Town and Country, Missouri 63131; United States; 38°38′12″N 90°26′29″W

Information
- Type: Private, All-Girls
- Motto: Live + Jesus
- Religious affiliation: Roman Catholic (Visitation Sisters)
- Established: 1833; 193 years ago
- Head of school: David Colón
- Faculty: 53 full time, 21 part time
- Grades: PK–12
- Colors: Red and white
- Song: Visitation, We Thy Daughters
- Athletics conference: GISL
- Nickname: Owls
- Team name: Vivettes
- Accreditation: ISACS
- Publication: Vizions (literary magazine)
- Newspaper: Paper Moon
- Yearbook: Crescent
- Tuition: $27,800 (2025-2026)
- Student Website: The Vivette Times
- Website: visitationacademy.org

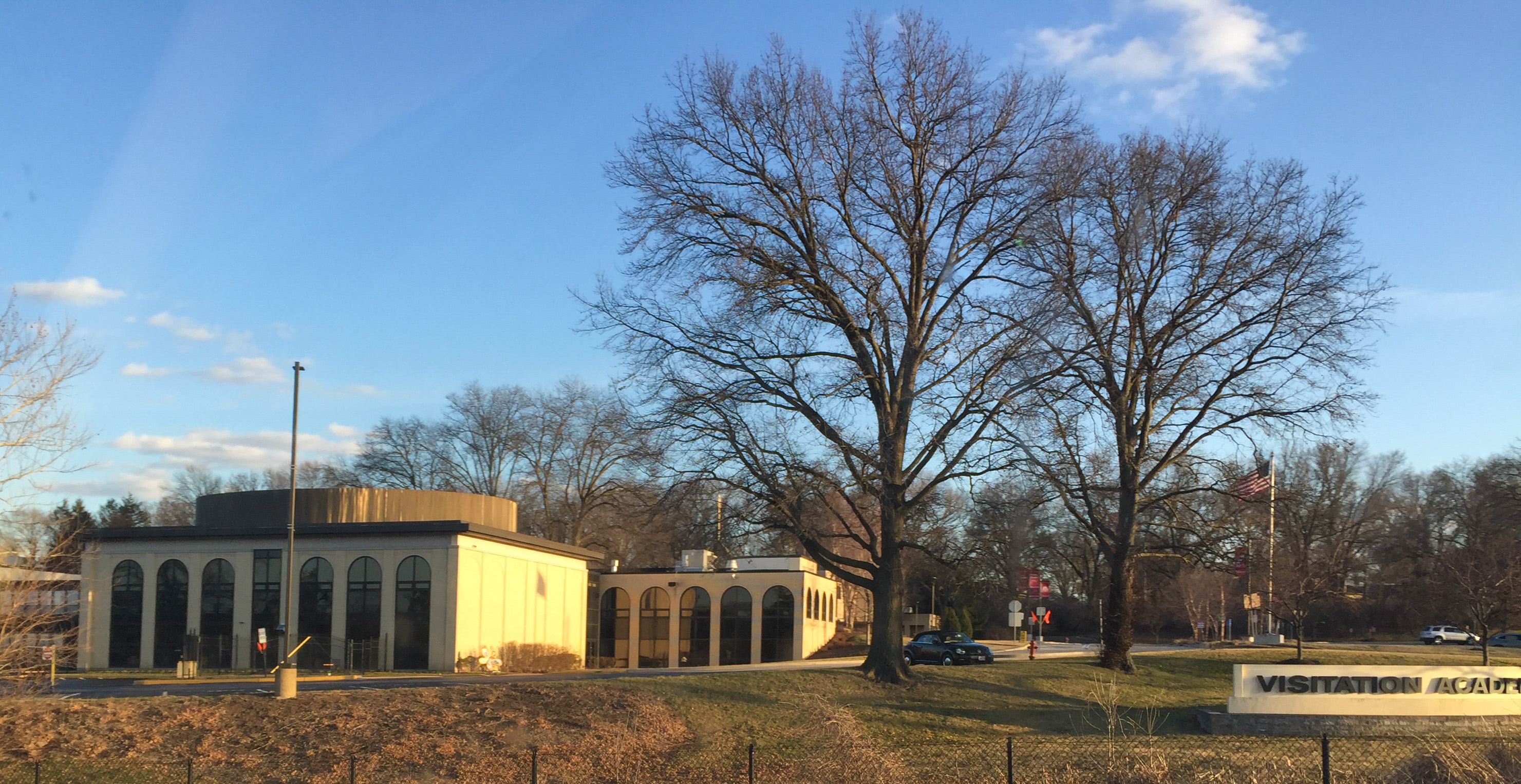
Visitation Academy of St. Louis, 2018

Visitation Academy of St. Louis, also known simply as Viz, is a private, all-girls, Catholic school in Town and Country, Missouri. It is a work of the Visitation Sisters who founded it in 1833.

== History ==
Visitation Academy was established in Kaskaskia, Illinois, in 1833 by a group of sisters from the Order of the Visitation of Holy Mary. The group originated from the Georgetown Visitation Monastery in Washington, DC, and were invited by Bishop Joseph Rosati of St. Louis to start a school in the region.

The school moved to St. Louis in 1844, in part due to flooding in Kaskaskia. The school moved again in 1892 and moved once more to the current location in 1962.

== Schools ==
Visitation Academy is divided into three schools: Lower (preschool through grade 5), Middle (grades 6 through 8), and Upper (grades 9 through 12). The preschool is co-educational and uses the Montessori method; kindergarten through 12th grade are for girls only. The Lower School is the only all-girls school at that level in the St. Louis region.

The Lower-Middle School has approximately 240 students; the Upper School approximately 300.

== Academics ==
Visitation is known regionally for its rigorous academics. Students participate in the Advanced Placement (AP) program and in St. Louis University's 1818 college credit program.

The school offers classes in Latin, Spanish, and French. Lower School students receive instruction in both French and Spanish.

== Extracurricular activities ==
Visitation Academy has various extracurricular activities, ranging from clubs to a fellowship program established in the 2024–25 school year. Students at Visitation Academy hold leadership positions, create clubs based on their interests, and participate in competitions on both the state and national levels. The fellowship program encourages students to focus on an area of interest and specialize in volunteering, education, and leadership.

=== Athletics ===
The Lower School competes in the Catholic Youth Council of St. Louis (CYC) in soccer, basketball, and volleyball.

The Upper School participates in the Missouri State High School Activities Association (MSHSAA). Sports for fall include golf, tennis, softball, cross country, field hockey, and volleyball. Winter sports include swimming, diving, racquetball, basketball, and cheerleading. In the spring, lacrosse, track and field, and soccer are played.

=== Fine arts ===
The Upper School stages several plays throughout the school year, including musicals, dramas, and student-directed plays. The theater program auditions boys from area boys' schools or co-ed schools for male parts, and sometimes recruits girls from the Lower School for child parts, e.g. for the orphans during a staging of Oliver!.

The music program in the Upper School includes a vocal choir, a handbell choir, and a liturgical choir. Two concerts are staged each year, one in the spring and one at Christmas. The Lower School also holds Christmas and Spring concerts.

The school has an art gallery where student work is displayed and, sometimes, sold. Art shows are also held in conjunction with the Upper School Spring and Christmas Concerts.

== Notable alumnae ==
- Madonna Buder, Catholic religious sister and triathlete, known as the Iron Nun
- Pauline Pfeiffer, journalist; second wife of Ernest Hemingway
- Mary Engelbreit, 1970, graphic artist, designer, author, illustrator, entrepreneur
- Lindsey Koller, 2011, American businesswoman
- Dorothy Morton, actress and soprano
- Lucille Mulhall, attended 1899–1900, America's first 'Cowgirl' declared by Teddy Roosevelt
- Belle Hunt Shortridge (1858–1893), American author
- Katie Walsh, 2003, American politician
