= Sisters for Christian Community =

Sisters For Christian Community
- Abbreviation: SFCC
- Formation: 1970
- Type: Independent congregation of religious sisters
- Key people: Sister Lillanna Kopp – founder
- Website: http://www.sfccinternational.org/

Sisters for Christian Community is a contemporary, ecumenical community of religious sisters founded in 1970 in direct response to the Catholic Church's Second Vatican Council.

Members live by a profile that embodies the values and principles defined and set forth in the official documents of the council.

== Description ==
Members live according to the evangelical vows of poverty, celibacy, and obedience and manifest their commitment to God within a new form of consecrated life they believe to be both prophetic and ecclesiastical. The Vow of Poverty is lived as serving and sharing; Obedience is practiced by the individual member through a careful listening to God and the cry of the poor; Chastity is lived as celibate love. Each member is self-supporting and responsible to finance her ministry, personal needs, housing, medical care and retirement. Each member determines her ministry on the basis of her personal call within community, her training and interests, as well as response to both the God within herself and the needs of those around her. Sisters For Christian Community are most often found in ministries that favor the poor and marginalized of the world. The primary mission of the Sisters For Christian Community is to work toward a global community of equality, justice and integrity.

The community is organized into geographical regions. As of 2025, there are 40 regions spread throughout 21 nations, which include but are not limited to: Australia, Belgium, Canada, England, El Salvador, Guatemala, India, Ireland, Kenya, Mexico, the Netherlands, New Zealand, Nigeria, Philippines, Portugal, Scotland, South Africa, Tanzania, Uganda, the United States, and Zambia. Members convene annually at an International Assembly to conduct community-wide business, and to explore the spiritual theme and topic selected for the specific assembly. The location of the International Assembly is in a different place each year. All community decisions, at both the local and international levels, are made through a process of consensus.

Leadership in Sisters For Christian Community is primarily for the purpose of communication. Selection of a leader is through a community-wide process in which each member discerns her qualifications, ability, and time before offering her services at either the regional or international level. Serving in a leadership role is an unpaid, voluntary endeavor for the good of the community.

Formation in Sisters For Christian Community is called the Becoming Process. A person in the 1st stage is an Inquirer. This stage last 1 to 2 years. The 2nd stage, Affiliation, also lasts 1 to 2 years. Any member may serve as the contact between an Inquirer and the local community members for 1 year. Throughout the Becoming Process, the prospective member studies the community closely with her SFCC mentor. She also attends meetings in the local region in order to learn about Sisters For Christian Community and to meet members.

The Region members and the Inquirer discern when she is ready to sign the Covenant of Affiliation and enter the 2nd stage as an Affiliate. The new Affiliate selects her SFCC mentor with whom she works closely for one year. She continues to attend meetings. During this period, the Region formally introduces the new Affiliate to the international membership through the community-wide newsletter, ALL-TO-ALL (ATA). The Region membership and Affiliate mutually discern when the Affiliate will be affirmed into full membership of the Sisters For Christian Community. Affirmation includes the pronouncement of the evangelical vows of poverty, obedience and celibacy, referred by Sisters For Christian Community as Serving, Listening and Loving.

Among its more prominent members in 2025 are

== Notable members ==
- Sr. Carol Baltosiewich, nurse and AIDS activist
- Sr. Madonna Buder, 86-year old triathlete known as the Iron Nun
- Sr. Ana Martinez de Luco, co-founder and executive director of the recycling center Sure We Can in Brooklyn, N.Y.
- Sr. Evelyn Mattern, farmworker advocate and program associate for the North Carolina Council of Churches
- Prof Sr Natalia Zotov, cosmologist at Louisiana Tech
- Sr McCanon Brown of Milwaukee, Wisconsin homeless shelter
- Sr Mary Modupe of Nigeria who is a canon lawyer
- Sr Marta Nyaga of Kenya who is known for her trade school for young adults

== See also ==
- Contemporary religious order
