= Little Flower Catholic High School for Girls =

Location
- 1000 West Lycoming Street; Philadelphia, Pennsylvania 19140; United States; 40°0′48″N 75°8′38″W

Information
- Type: Private, All-Female
- Motto: Vigilate et Orate (Watch and Pray)
- Religious affiliation: Roman Catholic
- Patron saint: St Therese of Lisieux
- Established: 1941
- President: Mrs. Kristie Hughes Dugan
- Principal: Ms. Kathleen Thérèse Radebaugh
- Grades: 9-12
- Colors: Maroon and White
- Mascot: Flossie
- Nickname: LF
- Team name: Sentinels
- Rival: St.Hubert's
- Accreditation: Middle States Association of Colleges and Schools
- Publication: Literary Garland
- Newspaper: Theresian
- Yearbook: Garland
- Tuition: $10,000
- Alumni: over 36,000
- Director of Philanthropy: Amy Steinmetz Carthy, '87
- Director of Institutional Advancement: S. Joan Ames, IHM
- Admissions Director: Kia Benjamin
- Athletic Director: Tim McCartney
- Website: littleflowerhighschool.org

Little Flower Catholic High School for Girls is a Catholic high school in Philadelphia, Pennsylvania within the Archdiocese of Philadelphia. It is named after Saint Therese de Lisieux and is located in the Hunting Park section of North Philadelphia. Little Flower publishes one of the most award-winning high school newspapers in the archdiocese, The Theresian.

Little Flower High School consists of roughly 400 girls and 0 boys. Till the late 2000s a small number of boys, around 7, attended as a part of Little Flower's ESOL Program (English for Speakers of Other Languages). The school's Alma Mater is sung by the students at a number of different events throughout the school year, including dances, proms, and assemblies.

== Athletics ==
- Fall Sports - Cross Country, Golf, Field Hockey, Soccer, Tennis, Volleyball
- Winter Sports - Basketball, Bowling, Cheerleading, Indoor Track, Swimming
- Spring Sports - Softball, Lacrosse, Track, and Field

== Notable alumnae ==
- Christine Nangle - Comedy writer and performer. Best known for The Simpsons, Saturday Night Live, and Inside Amy Schumer.
- Evelyn Mattern - American Roman Catholic nun and farmer worker advocate
- Courtney Niemiec - professional soccer player, currently playing for the Western New York Flash of the National Women's Soccer League
- Allyson McHugh - U.S. Women's National Team member (Swimming), 5 Time USA Swimming National Champion, 2019 NCAA National Champion (1650yd Freestyle)
- Sister Mary Scullion - Sisters of Mercy, Little Flower Class of 1971, is Philadelphia’s nationally renowned expert on homelessness.

== Notable volunteers ==
- D. Bruce Hanes - Former volunteer judge for the Mock Trial team. Because of his public support of same-sex marriage, Hanes has been removed from his volunteer position effective September 17, 2013.

== See also ==
- Northeast Catholic High School for boys
- Philadelphia Catholic League
