= Carol Baltosiewich =

American religious sister, nurse and AIDS activist

Carol Ann Baltosiewich, SFCC, (November 29, 1943 – September 18, 2024) was an American religious sister and nurse who was assigned by her superiors to care for young AIDS patients. In this experience she found a new direction for her life, becoming an activist on behalf of AIDS sufferers and the wider gay community.

== Life ==
Baltosiewich was born on November 29, 1943, in Wyandotte, Michigan. In 1963, she became a member of the Hospital Sisters of St. Francis, based in Springfield, Illinois, making her perpetual religious vows in 1966. She earned a degree in nursing at Marillac College in St. Louis, Missouri, in 1971. She went on to serve in various hospitals of her religious congregation in Illinois and Wisconsin.

In the 1980s, Baltosiewich was assigned by her superiors to care for a young gay man dying of AIDS in rural Illinois. Knowing little about AIDS or the gay culture, she convinced her superiors to send her and another Hospital Sister to Saint Vincent's Catholic Medical Center in Greenwich Village in New York City, a hospital known for their work with both gay and AIDS patients. They also worked at Saint Clare's Hospital in nearby Hell's Kitchen, an institution that served a large homeless and indigent population. She lived in a convent in Hell's Kitchen during her time in New York.

While there, Baltosiewich visited gay bars, worked on a hotline for those with questions about HIV, and volunteered with the Gay Men's Health Crisis.

As part of her ministry, Baltosiewich held the hands of AIDS patients while they died, sometimes when their own families were too afraid to be in the same room as them. She stayed overnight in homes set up for AIDS patients as part of the Good Samaritan Project. In 1988, Baltosiewich founded Bethany Place in Belleville, Illinois to provide services for those with HIV and AIDS.

Baltosiewich later left her religious order, and in 1994 joined the Sisters for Christian Community, an international, ecumenical order not connected to the Catholic Church. She served on a state AIDS commission.

Baltosiewich died on September 18, 2024, while a resident of a nursing home in Belleville.
