= Fresh Kills Landfill =

Landfill in Staten Island, New York

- Landfill site
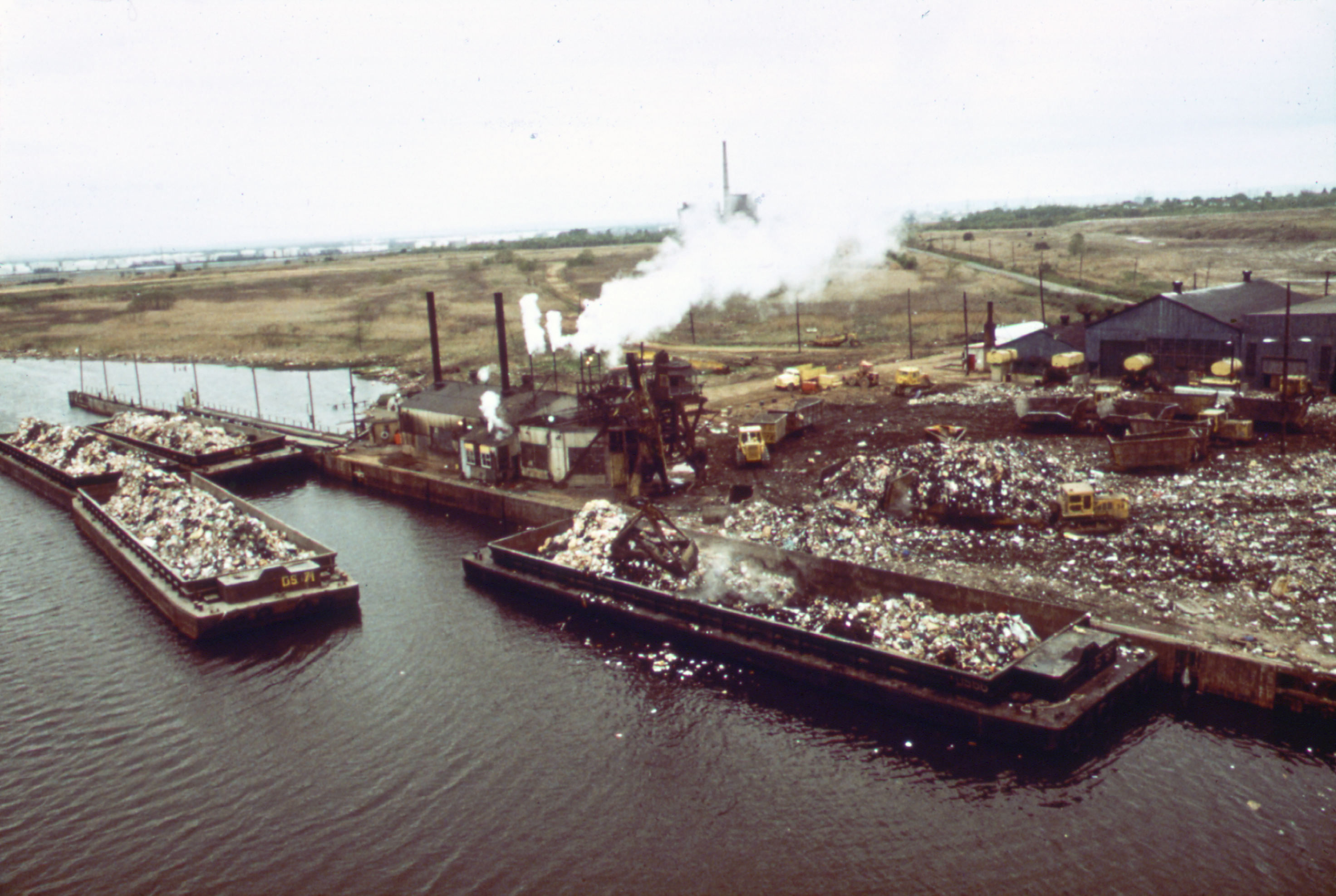
- Garbage scows bring solid waste to Plant #2 at Fresh Kills Landfill in 1973

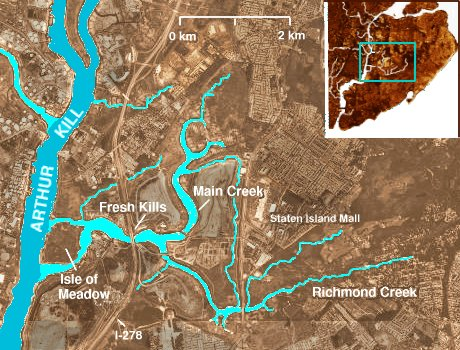
- Fresh Kills Landfill on the western edge of Staten Island
- Coordinates: 40.57667°N 74.18733°W
- Opened: April 1948
- Closed: March 22, 2001

Area
  - Total: 890 ha (2,200 acres)

The Fresh Kills Landfill was a landfill covering 2,200 acres (890 ha) in the borough of Staten Island in New York City, United States. The name comes from the landfill's location along the banks of the Fresh Kills estuary in western Staten Island.

The landfill opened in 1948, intended to be temporary, but by 1955 had become the largest in the world, and it remained so until its closure in 2001. At the peak of its operation, in 1986, Fresh Kills received 29,000 short tons (26,000 t) of residential waste per day, playing a key part in the New York City waste management system. From 1991 until its closing, it was the only landfill to accept New York City's residential waste. It consists of four mounds that range in height from 90 to about 225 feet (30 to about 70 m) and hold about 150 million short tons (140×10^{6} t) of solid waste. The archaeologist Martin Jones characterizes it as "among the largest man-made structures in the history of the world."

In October 2008, reclamation of the site began for a multi-phase, 30-year site redevelopment. The landfill has been developed into Freshkills Park.

== Beginning ==
New York's municipal incinerators peaked in capacity with 21 plants in 1937 and declined during World War II when salvage and conservation programs reduced the use and discard of combustible materials. The result was the closing of nine of the city's incinerators and a sharp reduction in the combustion of waste by 1944. By 1946, only ten incinerators were in operation, with capacity having declined by half since 1937. This meant more solid waste for the city's eight landfills to handle. The two landfills in Brooklyn and the two in the Bronx had, respectively, just one and two years left before reaching capacity. Only one landfill, Edgemere Landfill in Queens, had a long-term future, and as such, an alternative site had to be found.

In 1946, New York City purchased a 2,200-acre (890 ha) site, which was considered worthless swampland in what was then a rural agricultural area in Staten Island, for a proposed three-year municipal waste dump, as a temporary solution to the closing of the Rikers Island Landfill. The plan was endorsed by the Triborough Bridge and Tunnel Authority chairman, Robert Moses. He wanted the area to be developed as Staten Island's industrial base, as it was opposite the Arthur Kill from the heavy industry of New Jersey. Moses saw the project as key to the development of the island, and with it, the possibility of more parkland, highways, industry, and possibly even an airport.

Staten Island residents and their representatives opposed the plan. Assemblyman Edmund P. Radigan introduced a secession bill in the Legislature. A bill was passed (later vetoed by the governor) requiring all garbage to be incinerated before dumping. Ellsworth B. Buck, called for the federal government to step in and stop the project. Cornelius Hall, when he was the city's public works commissioner, opposed the project, but when he became the Borough President of Staten Island, he surprised residents by backing the plan, saying: "I am firmly convinced that a limited landfill project can be undertaken at Fresh Kills, a project that would prove of great value to the island through the reclamation of valuable land from now worthless marshland." Hall intended the landfill to be part of a proposed belt highway along Staten Island's west shore, which was approved by Moses in exchange for his support of the landfill. Hall went on to say "I want [landfilling] operations limited to [a] period not to exceed three years ... I am going along with this proposal because I believe ... we are in a position to use this fill to our advantage, for the development of the West Shore of Staten Island, which is essential." The talk of using Fresh Kills for only three years may have been a ploy to allow Hall to save face politically. As described in an inter-departmental report from 1946: "Because of the substantial sums involved in the preparation and acquisition of the [Fresh Kills] site, [in order to justify this expense] the City must dispose of refuse at this location for a number of years."

One of the first steps taken was the dredging of the marsh to allow the passage of the city's garbage scows. The landfill accepted its first scow in April 1948. Shortly before the landfill opened, an expansion of the landfill project was approved by the City Planning Commission, which called for a 2,200-acre (890 ha) project organized in 13 sections. The landfill was planned to be structured in layers, with a layer of garbage covered by a layer of ash (the remains of burnable trash from the city's incinerators), another layer of garbage, and then a layer of dirt to contain the smell. At the end of the landfill's usable life, new real estate would be created, allowing it to top off at 10–15 feet (3–5 m) above sea level. The plan called for Fresh Kills to be used for 20 years, then developed as a multiuse area with residential, recreational, and industrial components. In 1950, the height was increased to 25–40 feet (8–12 m). By 1955, Fresh Kills was the largest landfill in the world, serving as the principal landfill for household garbage collected in New York City.

== Operations ==
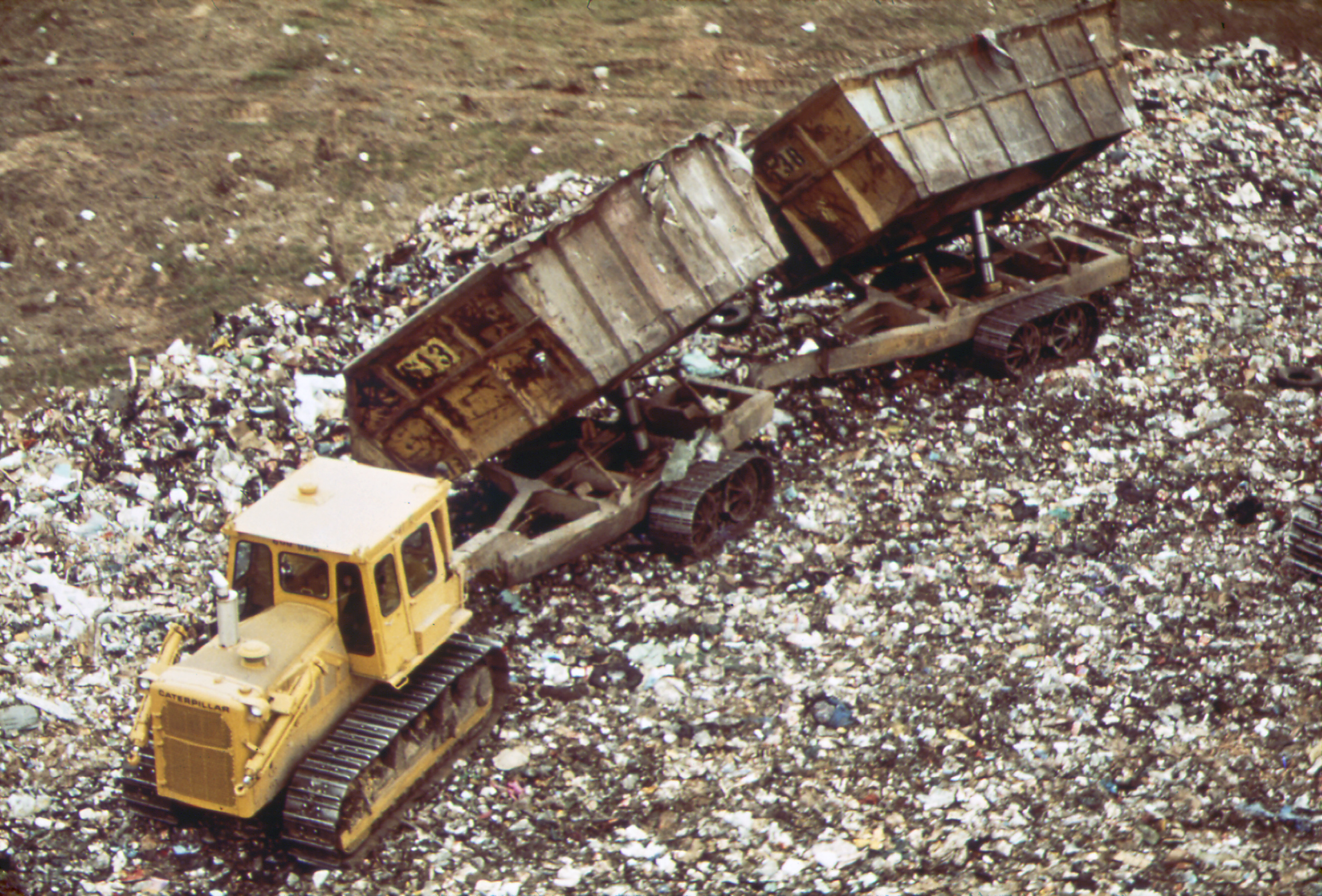
A D7 Tractor with two Athey Wagons dumping, 1973.

Operations during the 1960s were conducted in three locations named "Plant 1", "Plant 2", and "Brookfield Avenue." Plant #1 was located at the site of an old factory on the south side of the junction of the Great Fresh Kills, and Little Fresh Kills. It was reachable via Muldoon Avenue. Plant #2 was located upstream on the north side of Fresh Kills near where Richmond Creek branches off. It was reachable from Victory Boulevard. The Brookfield Avenue site was north of the Arthur Kill Road and Brookfield Avenue intersection.

Plant 1 was the administrative headquarters, and also the leading repair facility. Plant 1 and Plant 2 were for marine unload operations. Barges arrived from the other boroughs (primarily Manhattan and Brooklyn). Refuse was picked up by a crane (called a "digger") using a clamshell bucket and deposited in a caterpillar-tracked side-dump vehicle called an "Athey wagon" (not related to the equipment of the same name used for oil drilling).

Two wagons were then pulled to the active dumpsite by a tractor (Caterpillar D7, D8, D9) and emptied. The Plant 1 digger was electric, but the Plant 2 one was steam-powered. The diggers were supplemented by other cranes (mostly mounted on barges). A typical day would unload twelve barges (six at each plant). Operations were carried out from 8 am to midnight six days a week. The midnight to 8 am shift was for maintenance.

A wooden trestle bridge was built across Fresh Kills Creek to expand the Plant 2 operating area. This bridge allowed dumping east to Richmond Avenue. As the actual dump site moved further from paved roads, it became more difficult for trucks to unload. The Brookfield Avenue site was opened in 1966 and used exclusively for trucks.

During this period, the dump was in a state of flux. Original plans showed the dump with a twenty-year lifespan. One proposal for the West Shore Expressway bridge across Fresh Kills included a tide gate, which would have blocked Plant 2's marine access. The bridge, when finally built in 1959, actually enhanced operations. The bridge was finished long before the rest of the expressway and was used by workers to travel between the two plants.

== Issues ==
Initially, the land where the landfill was located was a salt marsh in which there were tidal wetlands, forests, and freshwater wetlands. The subsoil was made up of clay, with sand and silt as the top layer of soil. The tidal marsh, which helped to clean and oxygenate the water that passed through it, was destroyed by the dump. The fauna were largely replaced by herring gulls. The native plant species were driven out by the common reed, a grass that grows abundantly in disturbed areas and can tolerate both fresh and brackish water. The stagnant, deoxygenated water was also less attractive to waterfowl, and their population decreased. Samuel Kearing, who had served as sanitation commissioner under Mayor John V. Lindsay, remembered in 1970 his first visit to the Fresh Kills project:

It had a certain nightmare quality. ... I can still recall looking down on the operation from a control tower and thinking that Fresh Kills, like Jamaica Bay, had for thousands of years been a magnificent, teeming, literally life-enhancing tidal marsh. And in just twenty-five years, it was gone, buried under millions of tons of New York City's refuse.

The environmental impact of the waste site was so significant that the base of the landfill was even discussed as the global starting point (GSSP) of the Anthropocene.

Animals were also a problem. Feral dog packs roamed the dump and were a hazard to employees. Rats also posed a problem. Attempts to suppress the population with poison failed. The area was declared a wild bird sanctuary, and some hawks, falcons, and owls were brought in. The area became a popular spot for birdwatching. Because of the predatory birds, rat sightings dropped dramatically, especially during the day.

From 1987 through 1988, in an environmental disaster known as the syringe tide, significant amounts of medical waste from the Fresh Kills landfill, including hypodermic syringes and raw garbage, washed up onto beaches on the Jersey Shore, in New York City, and on Long Island. This event forced the closing of beaches on the Atlantic coast. After much deliberation, New York City was required to pay $1 million for past pollution damages as well as pay for the cleanup. No reparations were paid to the business owners on the Jersey Shore for revenues lost during the months of inactivity.

== Closure ==
As a result of intense community pressure, a state law was passed in 1996 requiring that the landfill cease accepting solid waste by the end of 2001. By 1997, two of the four landfill mounds were closed and covered with a thick, impermeable cap. The landfill received its last barge of garbage on March 22, 2001.

At its peak of operation in 1986–87, Fresh Kills received as much as 29,000 short tons (26,000 t) of trash per day. It was estimated that, if kept open, the landfill would have eventually reached a height of 500 feet (150 m) or more. At this height, it would have been taller than Todt Hill making it the highest point on the East Coast south of Mount Desert Island in Maine. Under local pressure from Staten Island Borough President Guy Molinari, and with the support of mayor Rudy Giuliani, New York state governor George Pataki, and the United States Environmental Protection Agency (EPA), the landfill site was finally closed on March 22, 2001, though it was temporarily reopened soon after for the September 11, 2001 attacks on the World Trade Center in Manhattan (see below). The garbage once destined for Fresh Kills was shipped to landfills in other states, primarily in Pennsylvania, but also in Virginia and Ohio. Some garbage was also sent to New Jersey for incineration.

== Use after September 11 attacks ==
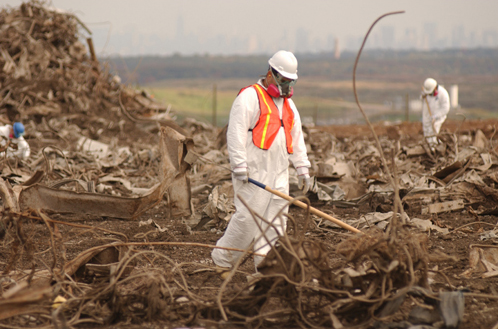
Worker combing through debris from the World Trade Center at the Fresh Kills landfill; Manhattan is visible in the distance

After the September 11, 2001 attacks, Fresh Kills was temporarily reopened as a sorting ground for roughly a third of the rubble from Ground Zero. More than 1,600 personal effects were retrieved during this time. About 1.6 million short tons (1.5×10^{6} t) of rubble came here for sorting.

Thousands of detectives and forensic evidence specialists worked for over 1.7 million hours at Fresh Kills Landfill to try to recover remnants of the people killed in the attacks. A final count of 4,257 human remains was retrieved, but only 300 people were identified from these remains. A memorial was built in 2011, which also honors those whose identities were not able to be determined from the debris. The remaining waste was buried in a 40-acre (160,000 m^{2}) portion of the landfill; it is highly likely that this debris still contains fragmentary human remains.

== Redevelopment ==
A depiction of the future Fresh Kills Park

The Fresh Kills site was transformed into reclaimed wetlands, recreational facilities and landscaped public parkland, the most significant expansion of the New York City parks since the development of the chain of parks in the Bronx during the 1890s. The new park was designed by James Corner Field Operations, the landscape architecture firm also responsible for the design of the High Line in Manhattan.

In January 2005, Staten Island Borough President James Molinaro announced plans to open three roads leading out of the former landfill to regular traffic, as part of an effort to ease road congestion. Construction on the actual park began in 2008. The three-phase development of the park, which includes a September 11 memorial, is expected to last 30 years. The draft Environmental Impact Statement (EIS) was published for public review in May 2008. Construction drawings for the first phase of development in the South Park section were completed in mid-2011.

The Department of Parks and Recreation is responsible for implementing the plan for turning the landfill into a park. They used a Draft Master Plan that integrated three aspects—programming, wildlife, and circulation—and proposed five main parks: the Confluence, North Park, South Park, East Park, and West Park. With an eventual size of 2,200 acres (890 ha), Freshkills Park will be three times the size of the 843-acre (341 ha) Central Park. It consists of a variety of public spaces and facilities for a multitude of activity types. The site is large enough to support many sports and programs including nature trails, horseback riding, mountain biking, community events, outdoor dining, sports fields, and canoeing/kayaking.

Schmul Park, the first section of Freshkills Park, opened to the public in 2012. Although the park is not scheduled for completion until 2037, the Parks Department reported that in 2010–11 two hundred species of wildlife had been seen in the former landfill. These included red-winged blackbirds, American goldfinches, red-tailed hawks, American kestrels, osprey, ring-necked pheasants, tree swallows, turkey vultures, and northern snapping turtles.

== Staten Island Transfer Station ==
Staten Island Transfer Station occupies a small portion of the site of the former Fresh Kills Landfill near the old Plant #2 at 40.580267°N 74.193994°W. The transfer station—an integral part of New York City's waste management plan—is expected to process an average of 900 short tons (820 t) per day of Staten Island-generated residential and municipal waste. The waste is compacted inside the 79,000-square-foot (7,300 m^{2}) facility into sealed 12-foot-high (3.7 m) by 20-foot-long (6.1 m) intermodal shipping containers. These containers are then loaded, four containers each car, onto flatbed rail cars to be hauled by rail to a Republic Services landfill in South Carolina. The eight-mile (13 km) Staten Island Railway freight service, which connects the facility to the national rail freight network via the Arthur Kill Vertical Lift Bridge, was reactivated in April 2007, after it had been closed in 1991.

== See also ==
- Staten Island boat graveyard
- Landfills in the United States
- Operation Wasteland
