= Madonna Buder =

American triathlete and nun

Sister Madonna Buder
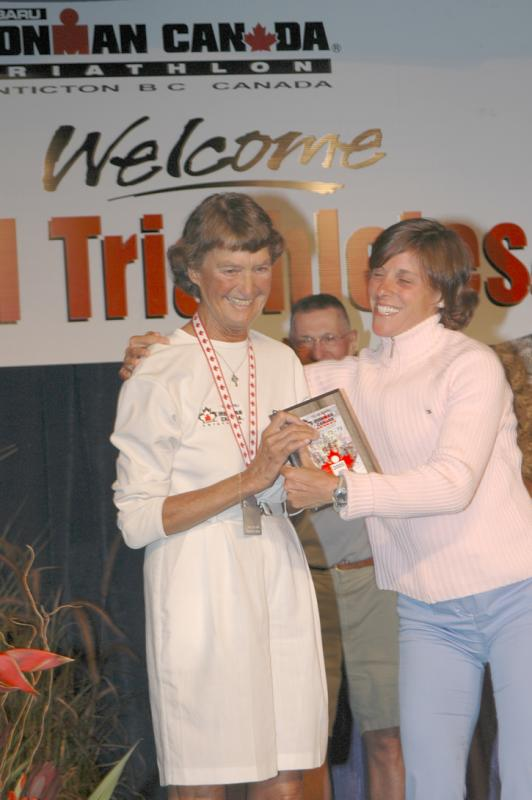
- Sister Madonna Buder wins the Women 75+ age division at Ironman Canada
- Born: Marie Dorothy Buder; July 24, 1930 (age 96); St. Louis, Missouri, United States
- Education: Visitation Academy of St. Louis; Washington University in St. Louis
- Occupations: Religious sister, triathlete
- Years active: 1952 - present
- Employer: Sisters for Christian Community

Madonna Buder, S.F.C.C. (born Marie Dorothy Buder; July 24, 1930), also known as the Iron Nun, is an American Senior Olympian triathlete and religious sister. Buder has the current world record for the oldest woman to ever finish an Ironman Triathlon, which she obtained at age 82 by finishing the Subaru Ironman Canada on August 26, 2012.

== Early life and religious ministry ==
Marie Dorothy Buder was born in St. Louis, Missouri on July 24, 1930. She was educated at Visitation Academy of St. Louis, an all-girl Catholic school run by the Order of the Visitation of Holy Mary. She went on to attend Maryville College for two years, and finished her education at Washington University in St. Louis, where she was a member of the Alpha Iota chapter of Kappa Alpha Theta. She entered a convent of the Congregation of Our Lady of Charity of the Good Shepherd at age 23. In 1970, she left the congregation to join 38 other Sisters from different and varying backgrounds to establish a new and non-traditional community of Religious Sisters. As a member of the non-canonical Sisters for Christian Community, a contemporary religious order inspired by the teachings of the Second Vatican Council that is independent of the authority of the Catholic Church, Buder has had the freedom to choose her own ministry and lifestyle.

== Triathlon career ==
Buder began training at age 48 at the behest of Father John who told her it was a way of tweaking, "mind, body, and spirit" and for the relaxation and calmness it can bring an individual. She completed her first triathlon at age 52 and first Ironman event at age 55 and has continued ever since.

At the 2005 Hawaii Ironman, at age 75, the Iron Nun became the oldest woman ever to complete the race, finishing 1 hour before the 17-hour midnight cut-off time. At the 2006 Hawaii Ironman, at age 76, she again became the oldest woman ever to complete the race, finishing with a time of 16:59:03.

On August 24, 2008, Buder participated in the Ironman race held in Penticton, British Columbia, Canada. She was unable to finish the race by a factor of seconds as she was unable to reach the finish line within the 17 hours cut-off limit. However, 371 days later, on August 30, 2009, Buder completed Ironman Canada (Penticton, British Columbia) in a time of 16:54:30. This accomplishment broke her own record of being the oldest female to complete the Ironman distance at 79 years old. In fact, the Ironman organization has had to add new age brackets as the sister gets older. Unfortunately, although Buder started the 2010 Ironman Canada competition at the age of 80, she was unable to complete the course, due to a wetsuit issue. She competed in the 2011 Ironman Canada competition but missed the bike cut-off by 2 minutes.

She was willing to compete in an Ironman triathlon again in 2012 as she wanted to open up an 80+ age category and be the oldest person, male or female, to finish an Ironman triathlon. Buder thus became the overall Ironman world record holder in age at age 82 by finishing the Subaru Ironman Canada on August 26, 2012. She beat the record previously held by 81-year-old Lew Hollander who finished the Ironman Kona World Championship in 2011. Buder finished her race in 16:32:00 minutes beating Hollander's time of 16:45:55 although they competed on different courses. Hollander, Buder, and Bob Scott were 82 when they competed in the 2012 Ironman World Championship in Kona on October 13, 2012, but Buder and Scott did not finish the race.

Buder attended the Challenge Family inaugural year in Penticton BC, Canada on August 25, 2013 during the bike portion in a relay team finishing her portion of the Challenge in 7:38:45. At the Volunteer/Athlete Banquet held the next evening on August 26, 2013, Felix Walchshofer, CEO of Challenge Family Penticton, invited Buder to compete in Challenge Roth next year as a single Triathlete.

In 2014, Buder was inducted into the USA Triathlon Hall of Fame.

== Works and appearances ==
On October 5, 2010, Buder released her autobiography, The Grace to Race: The Wisdom and Inspiration of the 80-Year-Old World Champion Triathlete Known as the Iron Nun.

In 2016, Buder was featured in an ad for Nike, Inc that was aired during the Summer Olympic Games.
