= Evelyn Mattern =

Sister Evelyn Mattern
- Sister Evelyn Mattern in 1985, The Independent Weekly
- Born: January 7, 1941; Philadelphia, Pennsylvania, U.S.
- Died: November 30, 2003 (aged 62); Philadelphia, Pennsylvania, U.S.
- Occupations: Religious sister, social activist
- Parent(s): Evelyn and Joseph Mattern

Sister Evelyn Mattern, a Catholic religious sister, was active in social justice movements in North Carolina from the 1970s until her death in 2003. She was concerned with farmworker's rights, gender equality, and environmental issues. She was known for her life of prayer, contemplation, activism, and protest. Additionally, Sister Evelyn authored books on women mystics, the beatitudes, and the lives of women in ministry.

== Early life ==
Evelyn Mattern (née Linda Mattern) was born on January 7, 1941, in Philadelphia, Pennsylvania, to Evelyn and Joseph Mattern. She was the oldest of three children. As a child, Evelyn attended Catholic school and developed an interest in nature. Upon graduating from Philadelphia's Little Flower Catholic High School for Girls in 1958, she attended college for one year as a National Merit Scholar but left to join a convent, the Immaculate Heart of Mary sisters in Philadelphia. She took final vows in 1965. Shortly after joining the convent, she returned to college, graduating from the University of Pennsylvania with highest honors in English and history in 1962. Sister Evelyn also earned her doctorate in literature at the University of Pennsylvania, completing her dissertation on Shakespeare in 1969.

== A non-traditional religious sister ==
After leaving the Immaculate Heart of Mary sisters in 1975, Sister Evelyn joined a new, non-traditional congregation of sisters—the Sisters for Christian Community. The congregation was founded after Vatican II with the intention of reframing the traditional vows of obedience, chastity, and poverty, as listening, loving, and serving. This non-traditional congregation matched the changes that came with Vatican II as it emphasized prayer and open dialogue. In addition, the Sisters for Christian Community take their vows to God in the presence of one another.

== Move to North Carolina ==
Upon completing her doctorate, Sister Evelyn moved to Raleigh, North Carolina, to teach English at St. Augustine's University, a historically black college. There she joined efforts toward racial reconciliation. In 1976, Sister Evelyn left St. Augustine's University to start the Office of Peace and Justice at the Roman Catholic Diocese of Raleigh.

== North Carolina Council of Churches ==
In 1981, Sister Evelyn left the Office of Peace and Justice and joined the North Carolina Council of Churches as a program associate. Her early work for the Council focused on farmworker's rights. She also chaired the Council's education and advocacy committee. According to their mission statement, the Council of Churches “enables denominations, congregations, and people of faith to individually and collectively impact our state on issues such as economic justice and development, human well-being, equality, compassion and peace, following the example and mission of Jesus Christ.”

Sister Evelyn worked with the Council of Churches for nine years as an organizer, legislative lobbyist, and publications editor. During this time, she lobbied the state legislature for children's programs, welfare improvement, prison reform, and migrant issues. Sister Evelyn also edited and wrote for the Council's newsletter. In the late 1980s, she left the Council to teach English in local community colleges for five years, after which she returned to the Council to oversee publications and social action projects. During her years with the Council she set aside three months every summer to focus on her contemplative life.

== Social activism ==
As an activist Sister Evelyn worked closely with Student Action with Farmworkers and the Farm Labor Organizing Committee to improve conditions for farmworkers in North Carolina. For example, after witnessing the shoddy living conditions of many farmworkers, she advocated for the creation of a sixty-unit housing development for migrant workers near the town of Smithfield. Beginning in 1999 she was also involved in organizing a boycott of the Mount Olive Pickle Company that aimed to challenge the company to pay more for cucumbers so that growers would raise farmworker incomes. The boycott finally succeeded in 2004, after Sister Evelyn's death.

She also advocated for women's rights through her involvement with the Women's Center of Raleigh. In 1976, Sister Evelyn founded the Center to serve as a halfway house for formerly incarcerated women. The Center also provided counseling, protection, and other services to local women. She also served on the Equal Rights Committee of the North Carolina Council of Churches. The committee began by working for passage of the Equal Rights Amendment and after its defeat continued to address issues of gender inequality.

In 1990, Sister Evelyn traveled to Iraq with Reverend Jim Lewis to protest the impending Gulf War. Following their trip, the Indy Week, formerly the North Carolina Independent, gave them “Citizens of the Year” Awards. Shortly after that, she represented the Council of Churches in planning a conference on interfaith relations for Muslims and Christians.

Early in her time in North Carolina, Sister Evelyn volunteered to teach creative writing to inmates at the North Carolina Correctional Institution for Women. She continued her work in criminal justice by lobbying for legislation to outlaw the death penalty for most crimes committed by minors under the age of seventeen. She opposed the death penalty and helped organize other people to work for that cause.

Sister Evelyn also became involved in the environment movement by founding the Climate Connection: Interfaith Eco-Justice Network as a program of the Council of Churches. In 2005, the program changed its name to North Carolina Interfaith Power & Light. Today, North Carolina Interfaith Power & Light works with congregations to discuss how the keeping and care of creation is a unifying theme in theology of major religions.

== Contemplation ==
Sister Evelyn's home, Peace Hill, was a secluded log cabin in the woods where she lived with her dog, Paz. Though she lived alone, Sister Evelyn often invited friends to Peace Hill for conversation and silent walks in the woods. Her interest in interfaith spirituality led her, with Mel Williams and Claudia Horwitz, to begin the Interfaith Monastery Group, which created an interfaith group intended to honor the inner life of Contemplation and Practice and the outer world of Justice and Hospitality. After a few years, this group split in two; one group met for prayer and contemplation, thus carrying out the work of a monastery without walls, while the other group met to conceive the monastery's future home. Although plans for the monastery did not survive Sister Evelyn's death, a group continues to meet twice a month for contemplative silence, sharing, and fellowship. Inspired by Sister Evelyn's home, this group calls itself Peace Hill.

== Writing ==
Sister Evelyn was an avid writer. She published two books, Blessed Are You: The Beatitudes of Our Survival (Ave Maria Press, 1994) and Why Not Become Fire? Encounters with Women Mystics (Ave Maria Press, 1999), the latter written with Helen David Brancato. Shortly before her death in 2003, Sister Evelyn wrote a readers theater piece, The Women's Coffeehouse of Spirit: The Changing Role of Women in North Carolina Protestant, Catholic, and Jewish Congregations over the Last Forty Years. The script, based on interviews with women on the North Carolina Council of Churches Equal Rights Committee, presents a series of monologues from women of different faiths and denominations. In these monologues the women puzzle through the role that gender has played in their individual stories and how the landscape of faith and gender has changed in their lifetimes.

== Death ==
Sister Evelyn was diagnosed with lung cancer in early 2003. After undergoing chemotherapy for a short time, she learned she had terminal cancer. After the diagnosis she left Peace Hill and returned to Philadelphia in early October 2003. She entered the Sacred Heart Home, a Roman Catholic center for the terminally ill. She died on November 30, 2003, at the age of 62.
