= Ana Martinez de Luco =

American nun and founder of recycling center Sure We Can

Ana Martínez de Luco (b. 1960–61) is a nun and founder of the recycling center Sure We Can. Sure We Can is New York City's only nonprofit redemption center.

Affiliated with Sisters for Christian Community, De Luco's stated her goal was creating respectable jobs for the canners, who include immigrants, disabled, elderly, poor, and homeless people.

== Early life ==
De Luco was born in Basque Country.

== Career ==
Ana de Luco became a nun at age 19. She leads workshops, teaching people about workers cooperatives. Her religious affiliation is with Sisters for Christian Community.

De Luco moved to New York City in 2004 and embedded with the street homeless. She cofounded Sure We Can in 2007 when a redemption center closed.

In 2016, De Luco resigned from her lead management position at Sure We Can.

== Gallery ==
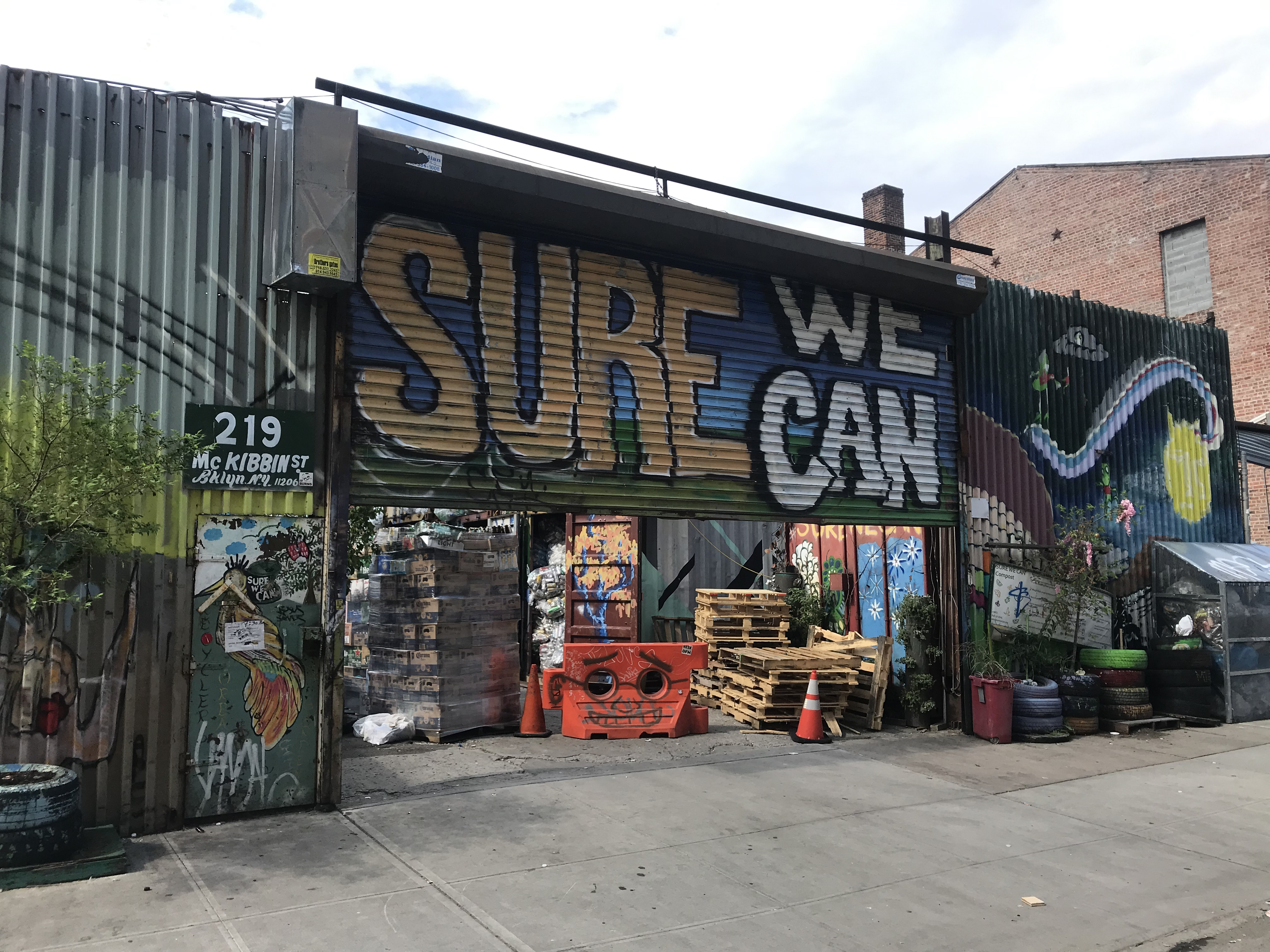
Sure We Can redemption center - Brooklyn, New York - 2019

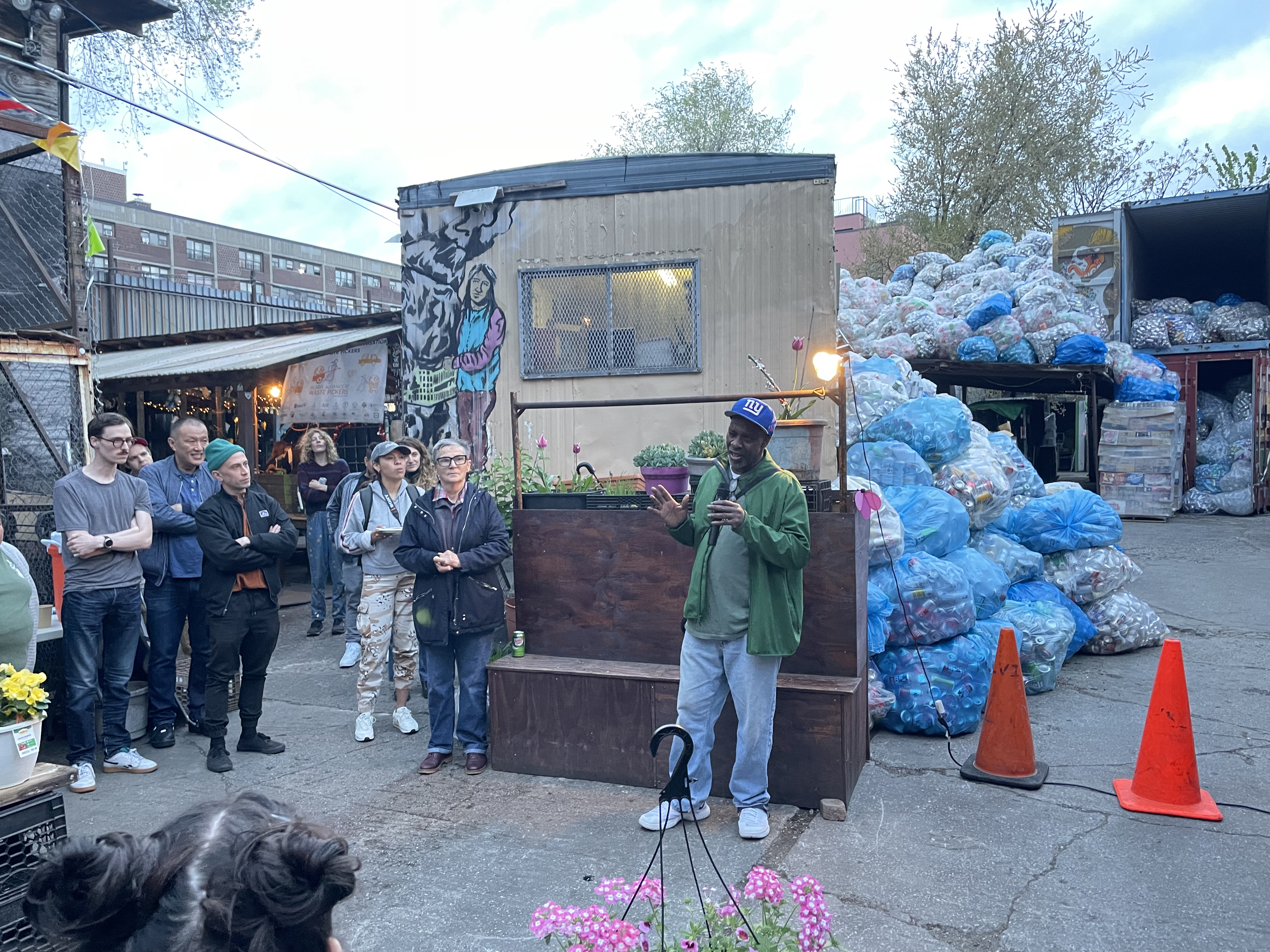
Ana and Eugene, founders of Sure We Can, at the Earth Day 2023 McKibbin lot purchase celebration

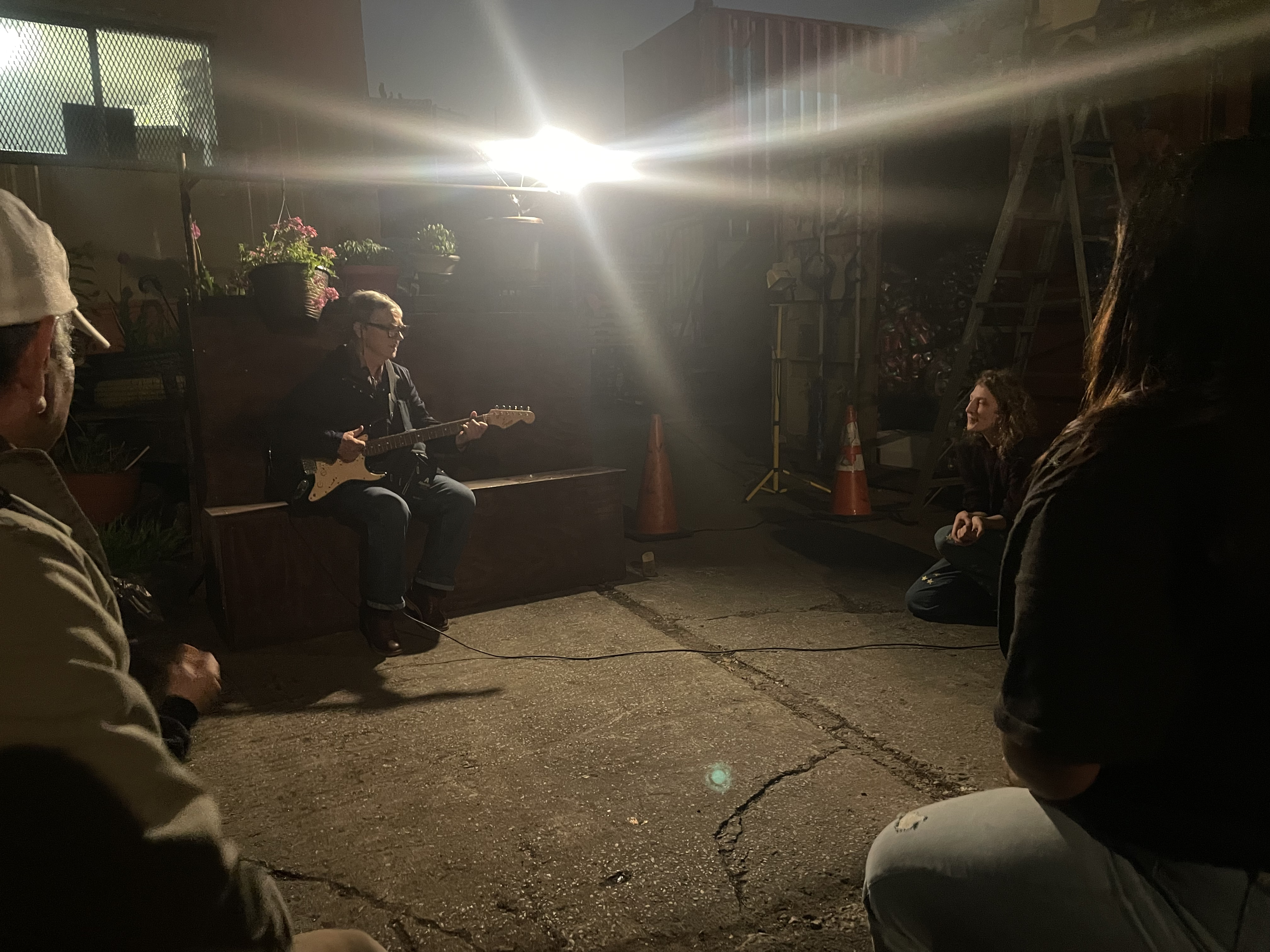
Ana Martinez de Luco plays guitar at the Earth Day 2023 celebration
