= Natalia Zotov =

New Zealander cosmologist and nun (1942–2012)

Natalia Victorovna Zotov OP SFCC PhD
- Наталья Викторовна Зотова
- Born: 1 July 1942; Karori, New Zealand
- Died: 2 March 2012 (age 69); Ruston, Louisiana, US
- Known for: gravitational wave research
- Relatives: Victor Zotov (father)

Academic background
- Education: University of Otago
- Thesis: A comparison of cosmological models with observational data. (1974)

Academic work
- Institutions: Louisiana Tech

Natalia Victorovna Zotov was a New Zealand physicist and mathematician who combined an academic career with religious life as a nun. She published many papers in theoretical and statistical cosmology.

== Early life and education ==
Zotov was born in Karori, Wellington, the daughter of Victor Zotov, who had emigrated from Russia with his parents as a 16-year-old in 1924, and Alice Zotov. In 1955, when she was 13, the family moved to Christchurch, New Zealand where Victor worked as director of the botany division of the Department of Scientific and Industrial Research. Educated at St Margaret's College, Christchurch and Christchurch Girls' High School, Zotov gained bachelors and masters (with honours) degrees in mathematics and physics, in 1963 and 1967 respectively, at University of Canterbury. She sang in the choir of St Barnabas Church, Christchurch and played violin in an orchestra and duo.

== Religious life ==
Zotov was brought up in the Russian Orthodox religion and was allowed to choose an Anglican or Catholic church in Christchurch; she chose Anglican, so her friends were surprised when she had joined the Catholic Dominican Sisters in Dunedin, entering religious life at St Dominic's Priory, Dunedin in 1973.

In 1981, Zotov took vows as a Sister for Christian Community.

== Academic career ==
Zotov completed a PhD in cosmology at the University of Otago in 1974. During that time she worked as an assistant lecturer at the university. She then worked in the Department of Scientific and Industrial Research as a mathematician and at the Carter Observatory as an astronomer in 1975 and 1976. She was awarded a senior visiting fellowship at the University of Cambridge and was a visiting scientist at Steward Observatory of the University of Arizona in 1977 and 1978.

Furthering her studies in the United States, Zotov worked in Illinois and Wisconsin, and then at Gannon University in Pennsylvania. While there, she spent two summers at the Vatican Observatory in Rome, the first woman to work there as an astronomer. She joined the engineering faculty at Louisiana Tech in 1990 and, until her retirement in 2009, she was a professor of mathematics there. In addition to teaching, she was actively involved in gravitational wave research at the LIGO Livingston Observatory in Louisiana. There she also mentored graduate and undergraduate students.

== Honours and awards ==
Zotov was given the Lecture Prize from the University of Canterbury Mathematical Society in 1967. Zotov was made a member of scientific research honor society Sigma Xi in 1995.

== Death ==
Zotov died on 2 March 2012 at Ruston, Louisiana, aged 69 from cancer. She had suffered from scoliosis of the spine.
