= Sunset Park Material Recovery Facility =

Recycling center in New York City

- Interactive map of the Sunset Park Material Recovery Facility area

General information
- Status: Operational
- Type: Recycling facility
- Location: 472 2nd Avenue; Brooklyn, New York, US
- Coordinates: 40°39′43″N 74°00′32″W
- Opened: December 2013
- Owner: Sims Metal Management (operator)

Technical details
- Grounds: 11 acres (45,000 m^{2})

Design and construction
- Architecture firm: Selldorf Architects

Website
- www.simsmunicipal.com/locations/sunset-park-mrf/

Sunset Park Material Recovery Facility is a recycling facility at the South Brooklyn Marine Terminal in the Sunset Park neighborhood of Brooklyn, New York City, United States. Operated by Sims Municipal Recycling, it was designed by Annabelle Selldorf, and its construction involved the use of a variety of recycled materials. The campus contains several structures, including an education center and New York City's first commercial-scale wind turbine. As of January 2022, it is the largest commingled recycling facility in the United States and the primary recycling center in New York City.

== Construction and facilities ==
The Material Recovery Facility is operated by Sims Municipal Recycling, part of Sims Metal Management, a large recycling company which holds a 40-year contract with the City of New York. The 11-acre (45,000 m^{2}) property sits on the Sunset Park side of the Gowanus Bay, at the South Brooklyn Marine Terminal.

It was designed by architect Annabelle Selldorf and built on the site of a former New York Police Department impound lot. The pier was raised four feet above what the city would otherwise require to be resilient against rising water levels and harsh weather. Consistent with its purpose, it was constructed using many recycled materials. The buildings are raised another four feet above the pier on recycled glass and stone left over from the development of the Second Avenue Subway project, while the structures themselves are largely built with recycled steel. The ropes used along the pier are selected to cultivate mussels, and three artificial reefs were installed at the end to help cultivate a habitat to attract marine life and birds. It has its own storm water management system to avoid runoff into the East River.

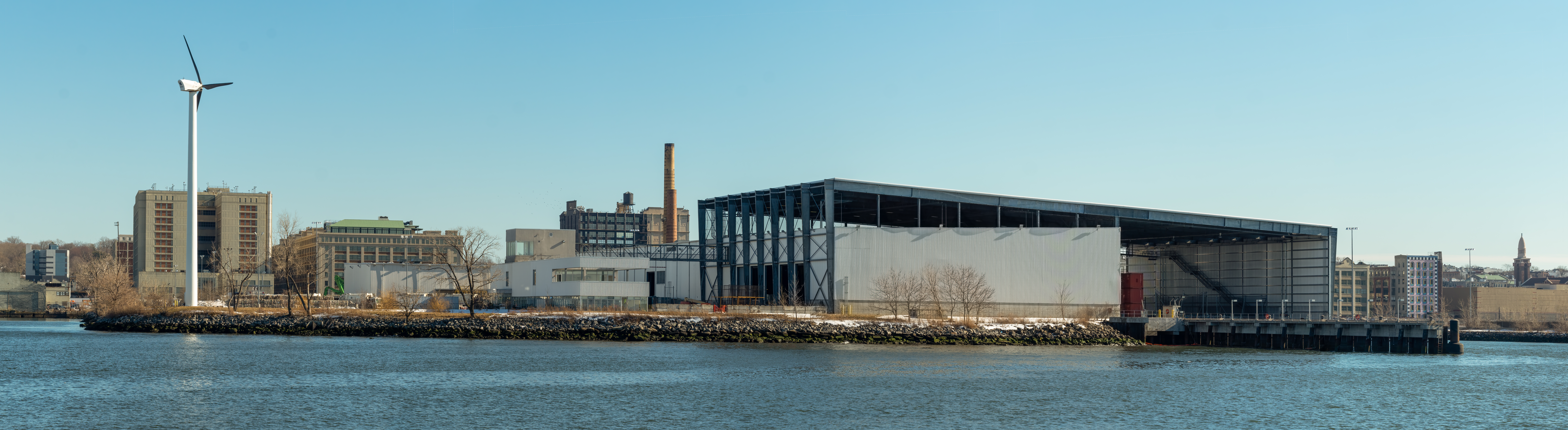
The Material Recovery Facility viewed from the other side of the Gowanus Bay. Barges arrive on the right side, unloading material into the large open tipping building. The education center is just left of center, connected to the tipping building by pedestrian bridge. To the rear-left of the education center is a storage building, while the main processing building sits behind the tipping building.

The campus includes a tipping building where materials arrive, the main processing building along the southern edge, storage buildings, and an administrative building. These structures take up about 140,000 square feet (13,006 m^{2}). The administrative building includes an education center for student and tour groups which includes exhibits explaining how the plant operates. An elevated pedestrian walkway connects the administrative building to the main processing building for public viewing. The tipping building's exterior is composed of exposed steel girders and lateral bracing; according to architectural writer Pavel Bendov, this helped the facility "avoid its fate as another box warehouse".

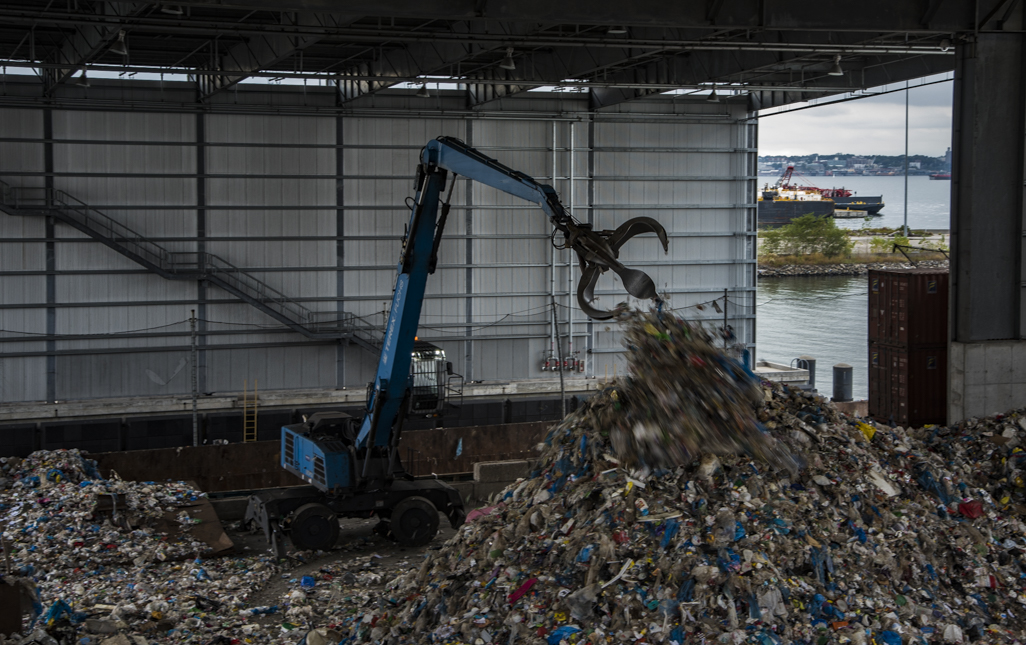
A scrap-handling crane inside the tipping building, where material arrives before it is processed.

A 160-foot 100 kW small wind turbine sits on the north corner of the property, the first commercial-scale turbine in New York City and the city's tallest as of January 2015. It produces about 4% of the facility's power. 30,000 sq ft (2,800 m^{2}) of rooftop solar panels provides another 20% of daily energy.

The total cost of construction totaled $110 million, of which $60 million was subsidized by the city as part of the Bloomberg Administration's PlaNYC 2030 project. The plant opened in December 2013. At the time, Michael Kimmelman of the New York Times praised its design, calling it "understated, well proportioned and well planned – elegant, actually, and not just for a garbage site" and suggested good design principles could work to help sell the public on the idea of recycling, which is necessary in order for the facility to succeed. As of January 2022, it is the largest commingled recycling facility in the United States.

== Activity ==
The plant is New York City's primary recycling facility, and processes three-quarters of its plastic, metal, and glass. As of February 2018, it processes about 20,000 tons of material monthly, up from 15,000 tons three years earlier, with a daily processing capacity of 1,000 tons. The facility's primary purpose is to sort the materials it receives before selling them to other processors. The machinery is manufactured by the Dutch company Bollegraaf.

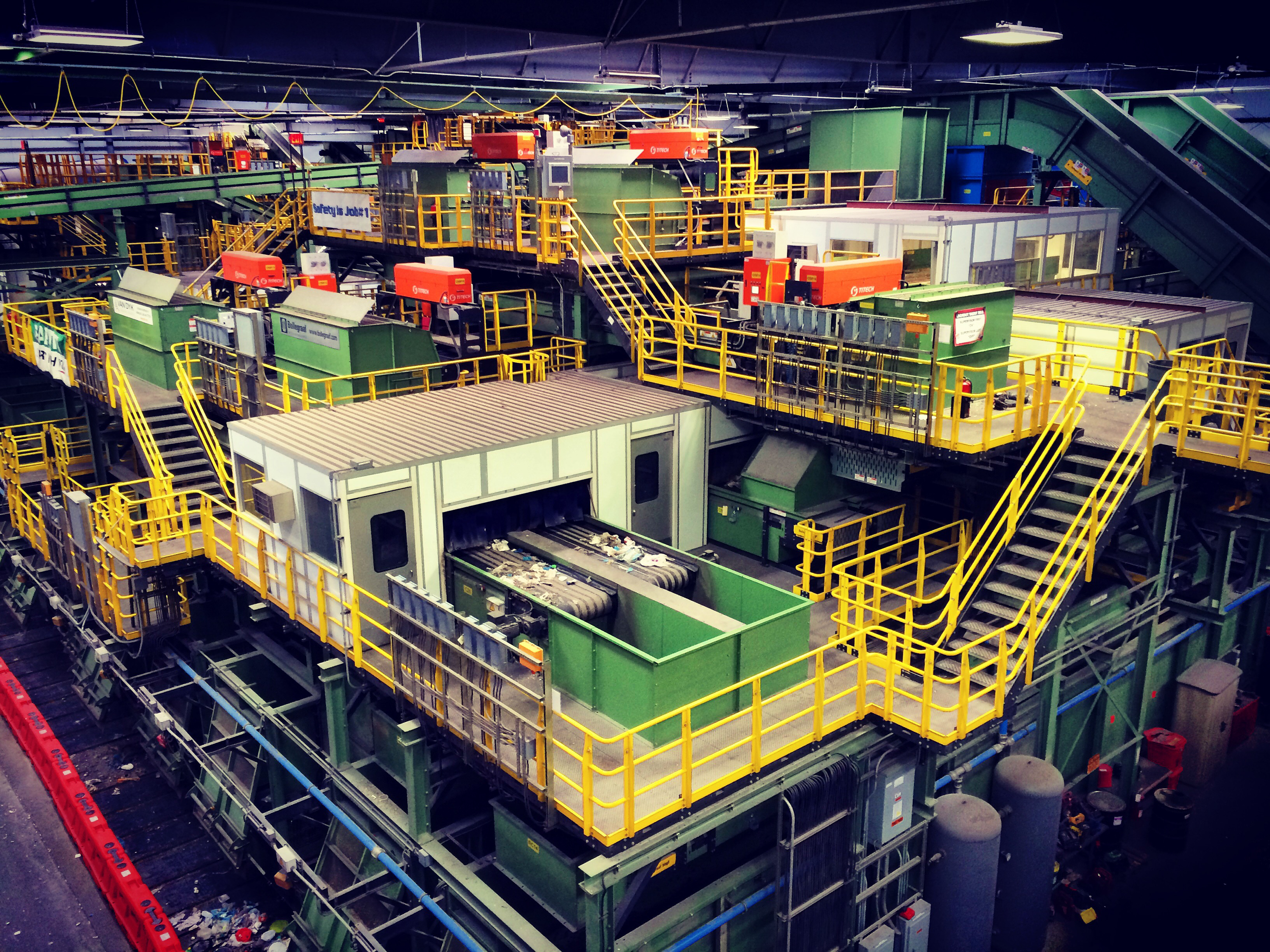
The main processing building, where a variety of machines separate the materials.

The material arrives in trucks, mostly hauled from barges, which reduces the total mileage sanitation trucks had to travel previously by about 240,000 miles (390,000 km). It is dumped into a pile on the main facility's floor where large items are removed manually and the rest put on conveyor belt. There are about 2 miles (3.2 km) of conveyors in the plant. Items removed manually include appliances, which can be recycled, and objects which cannot be recycled like bowling balls, which the facility receives about 1,200 of per year. The conveyor line first goes through a slow shredder with large gaps which opens the bags the materials arrive in. Particular materials are pulled out of the stream using specialized machines, for example using a rotating magnetic drum to extract tin cans. Another machine breaks glass small enough to fall through a disc screen to a dedicated stream below. A drum magnet separates ferrous metals from the glass. Optical sorters identify and separate certain types of plastic and paper, with air jets passing selected items from one line to another. An eddy current separator removes most of the remaining metals before passing through a trommel at the end of the line. Human inspectors are most involved at the end of the process to correct any mistakes the machines made. The separated materials are then collected, compressed into blocks, and moved out of the main facility, mostly by train. The time it takes an object to be put on the initial conveyor belt to when it is bundled at the other end is between two and ten minutes.

The city pays Sims to process its recycling at a rate of approximately $75 per ton of metal, glass, and plastic that comes from its sanitation trucks. When the value of the materials increases, the city receives a rebate. In 2019, Sims made nearly $25 million this way. The facility's activity and revenue are affected by politics, such as shifting policies in China reducing the amount of foreign recycled material it would accept, and debates over the implementation or expansion of New York's 1983 bottle bill, which allows people to redeem certain kinds of containers for a deposit fee.
