= Sure We Can =

Nonprofit organization based in Brooklyn, New York

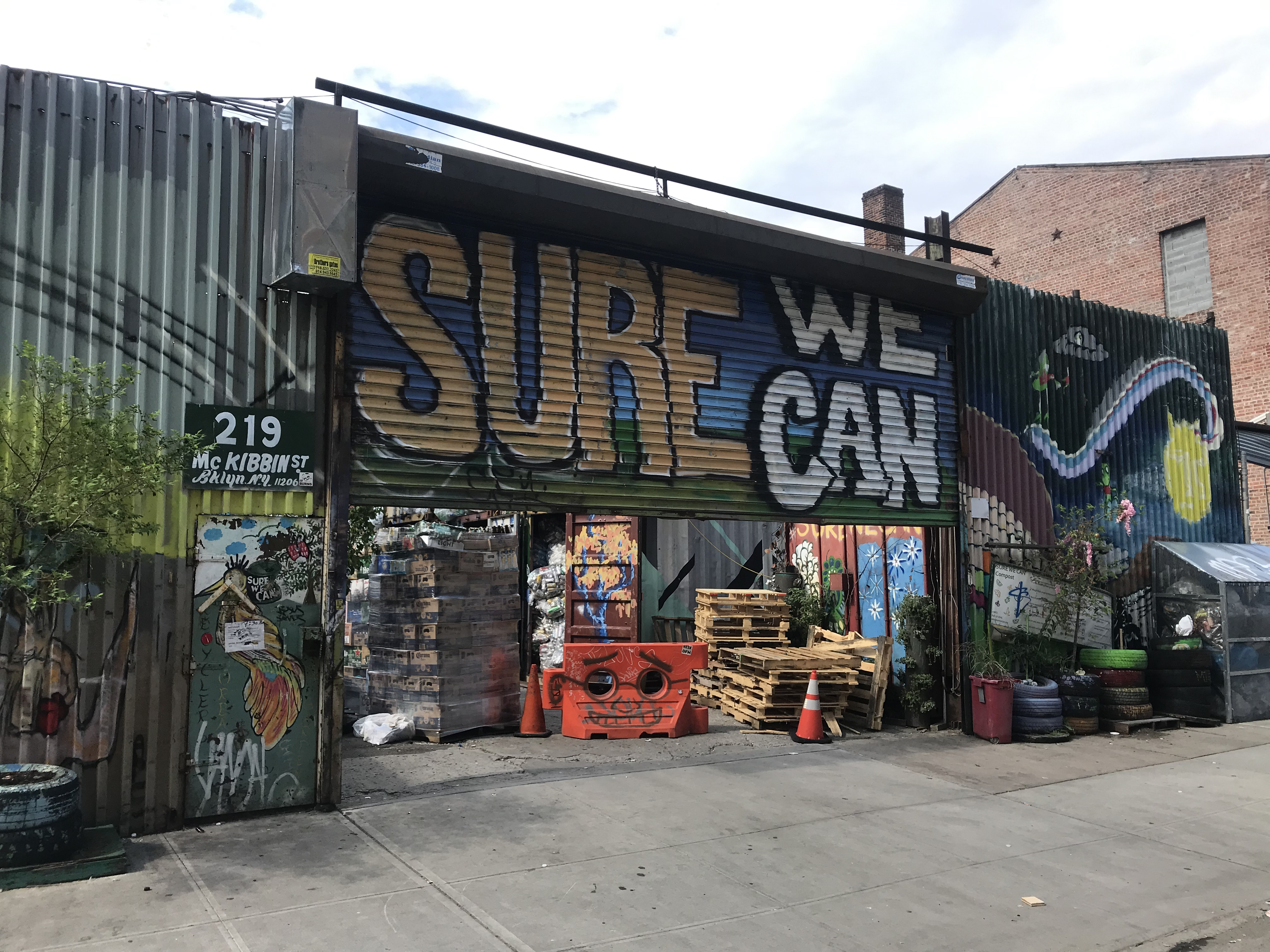
- Type: Non-Profit Organization
- Industry: Recycling
- Founded: Brooklyn, NY, 2007
- Founder: Ana Martinez de Luco; Eugene Gadsden
- Headquarters: Brooklyn, New York, U.S.
- Area served: New York City
- Key people: Ryan Castilia (executive director)
- Services: Providing redemption services
- Website: surewecan.org

Sure We Can is a nonprofit redemption center and community hub based in Brooklyn, New York. It provides container-deposit redemption services to the Brooklyn area. Additionally, the organization serves as a community hub for the canner community that redeems there and for local environmental causes that promote the organization's dedication to sustainability.

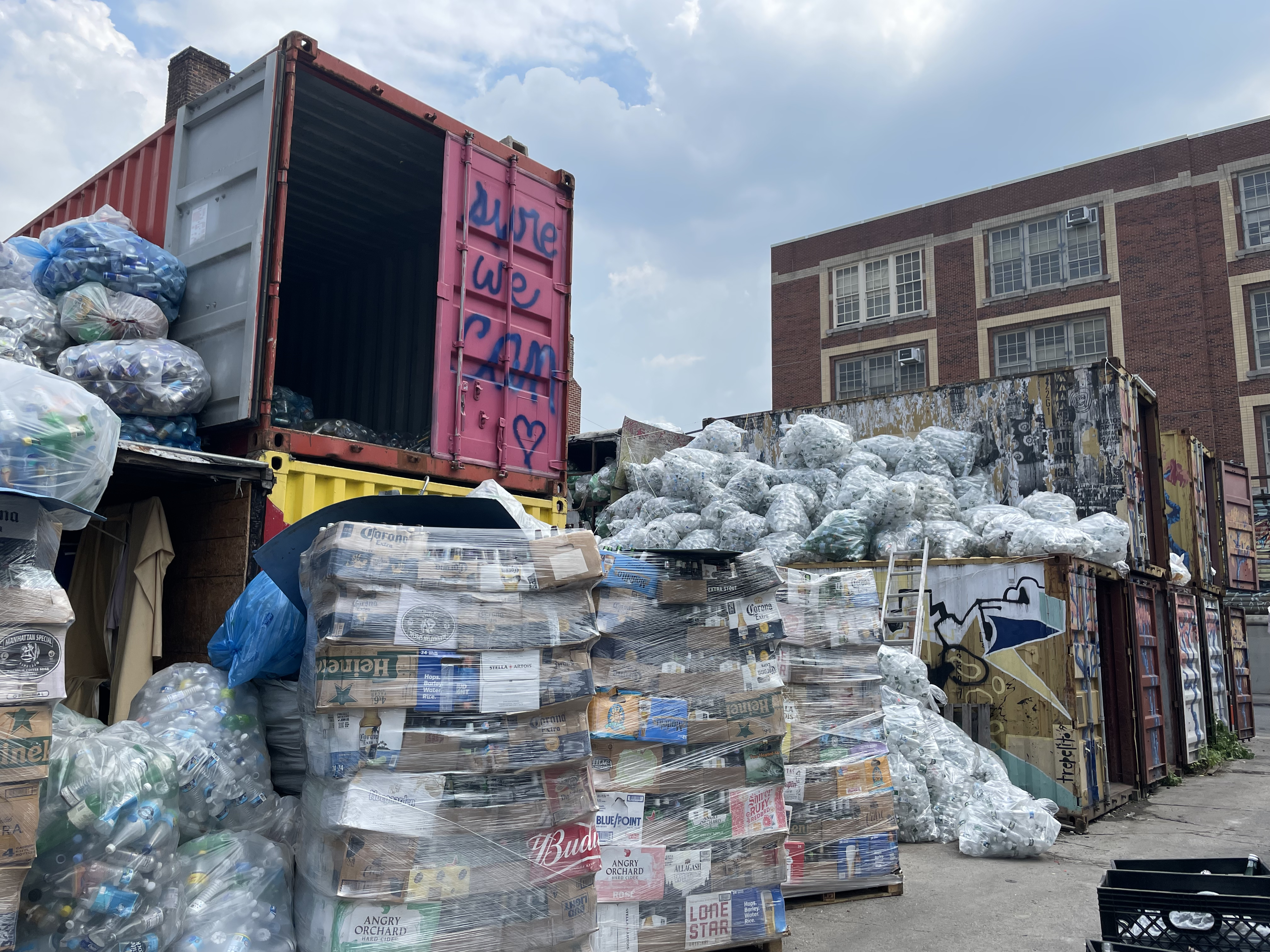
Recyclables are stacked, palleted, and stored in shipping containers before pick-up.

== History ==
The organization was founded in 2007 by cofounders Ana Martinez de Luco and Eugene Gadsden. The facility was designed with canners, the people who collect cans and bottles from the streets, in mind, aiming to provide a welcoming place they can redeem their cans and bottles. In 2019, the center annually processed 10 million cans and bottles for redemption, and served a community of over 400 canners. By January 2020, the number of canners the center serviced was 800. Now serving over 1,200 canners, Sure We Can estimates that they distribute $800,000 per year to canners. In 2020, Vice reported that the average canner who visits Sure We Can earns $1,000 per year "but earnings vary widely, with some workers taking home up to $40,000 a year. Others earn much less."

Starting in 2020, Sure We Can faced eviction by their landlord, who was interested in selling the lot the nonprofit had rented for over 10 years. In 2021, the organization continued to seek funding from either the city or private donor to buy the land. In 2023, Sure We Can achieved the goal of owning the property they operate out of on McKibbin Street. The purchase was facilitated by an acquisition loan from the Nonprofit Finance Fund, along with lending from SeaChange Capital Partners.

In 2023 Sure We Can released a report supporting an updated Bottle Bill in New York State. The report explained how an updated bottle bill would keep millions of tons of waste out of landfills while reducing the strain on NYC's municipal recycling system.

On March 1st 2025, on International Waste Pickers Day, Sure We Can opened a second redemption center location in the Broadway Junction neighborhood of Brooklyn. The New York City Economic Development Corporation worked with the Department of Citywide Administrative Services to permit the long-vacant 3,500-square-foot lot to Sure We Can.

== Awards ==
- Environmental Quality Award, U.S. Environmental Protection Agency (EPA), April 19th, 2013
- Community Service Award, Hispanic Federation, 2016
