= Eddy current separator =

Machine that separates non-ferrous metals from an input stream

An eddy current separator (ECS) is a machine that uses a powerful magnetic field to separate non-ferrous metals from an input waste or ore stream. The device makes use of eddy currents to effect the separation. Non-ferrous metals typically separated by an ECS include aluminum, copper and die-cast metals.

In waste sorting of single-stream recycling at materials recovery facilities, ECS is used after the waste has passed through some arrangement of magnets to remove ferrous metals. Eddy current separators are typically used at the end of the waste material stream, since ferrous metals will become heated when exposed to an eddy current field, leading to potential damage to the eddy current separator.

In mining, ECS is sometimes used to separate metals from mined ore.

== Technique ==
The eddy current separator is applied to a conveyor belt carrying a layer of mixed waste. At the end of the conveyor belt is an eddy current rotor. Non-ferrous metals caught in the eddy current end up in a product bin, while other material falls off the belt due to gravity.

Eddy current separators may use a rotating drum with permanent magnets, or may use an electromagnet depending on the type of separator.

== History ==
U.S. patent 3,448,857A for a device using eddy currents to separate non-ferrous metals from non-metals was granted to William Benson and Thomas Falconer of Eriez Magnetics in 1969.
