= Paperboy Prince =

American community organizer (born 1993)

Paperboy Love Prince
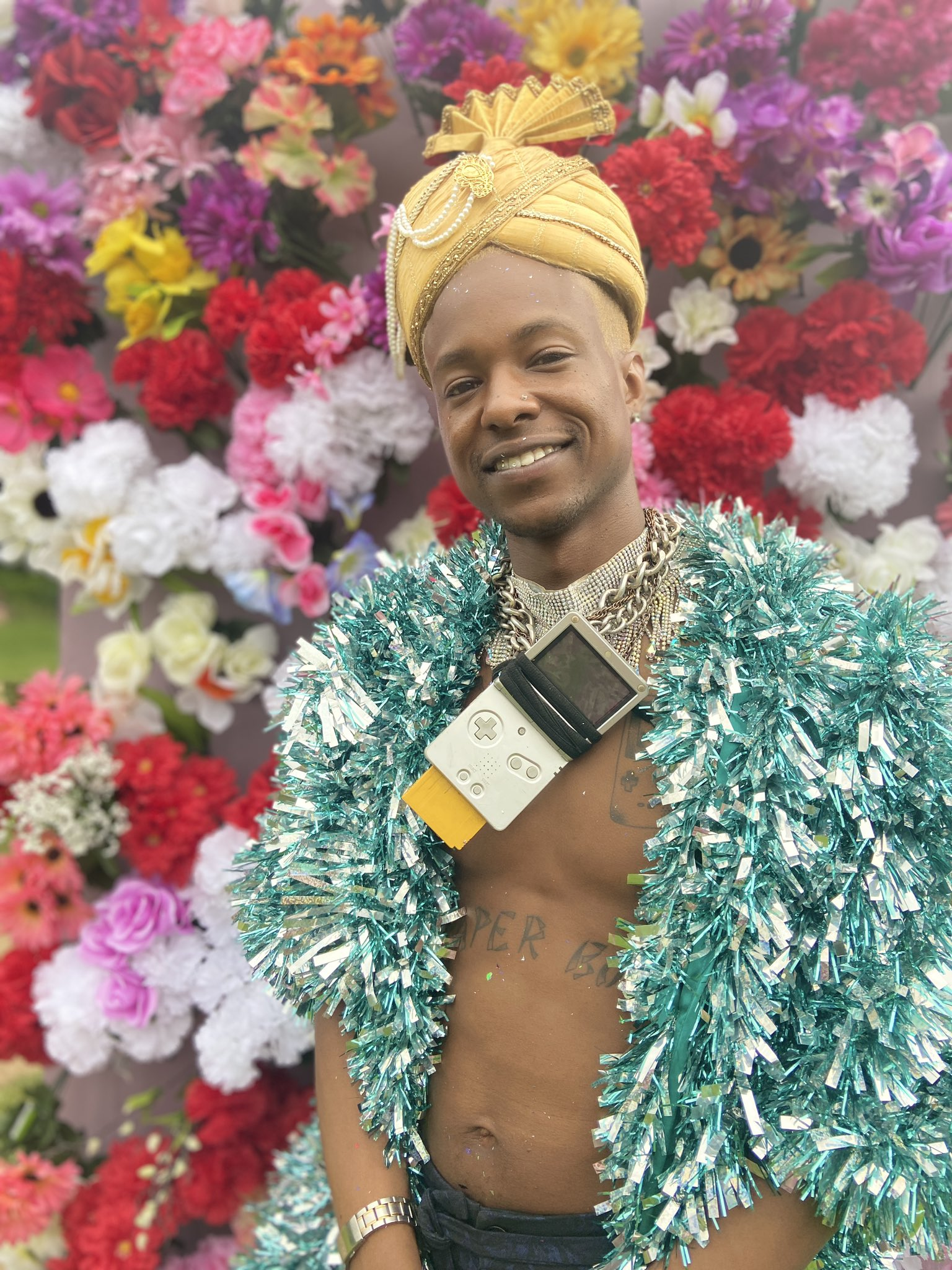
- Prince in 2021
- Born: January 8, 1993 (age 33)
- Other names: Paperboy the Prince, Paperboy Prince of the Suburbs
- Education: University of Maryland, College Park (BA)
- Occupations: Artist; politician
- Political party: Democratic

Paperboy Love Prince (born January 8, 1993), also known as Paperboy Prince of the Suburbs, is an American community organizer, artist, and rapper known for their eccentric personality and unconventional campaigns. Prince has run for several public offices, including Mayor of New York City, the U.S. House of Representatives, and President of the United States.

== Early life ==
Prince grew up in Baltimore, Maryland, and Bowie, Maryland, one of the suburbs of Washington, D.C. One of their grandfathers was a Pentecostal bishop, and both of their parents are devoutly religious. As a child they worked as a paperboy, hence the rapper's pseudonym, delivering The Wall Street Journal.

When Prince was 12, their mother won a contest that permitted her to bring them to have lunch with congressional representatives. Following that experience, Prince participated in youth government programs and eventually had internships with the U.S. House of Representatives and the U.S. Supreme Court. In college, Prince studied journalism and computer science at the University of Maryland, College Park while also creating art and hosting entertainment events.

== Political activities ==
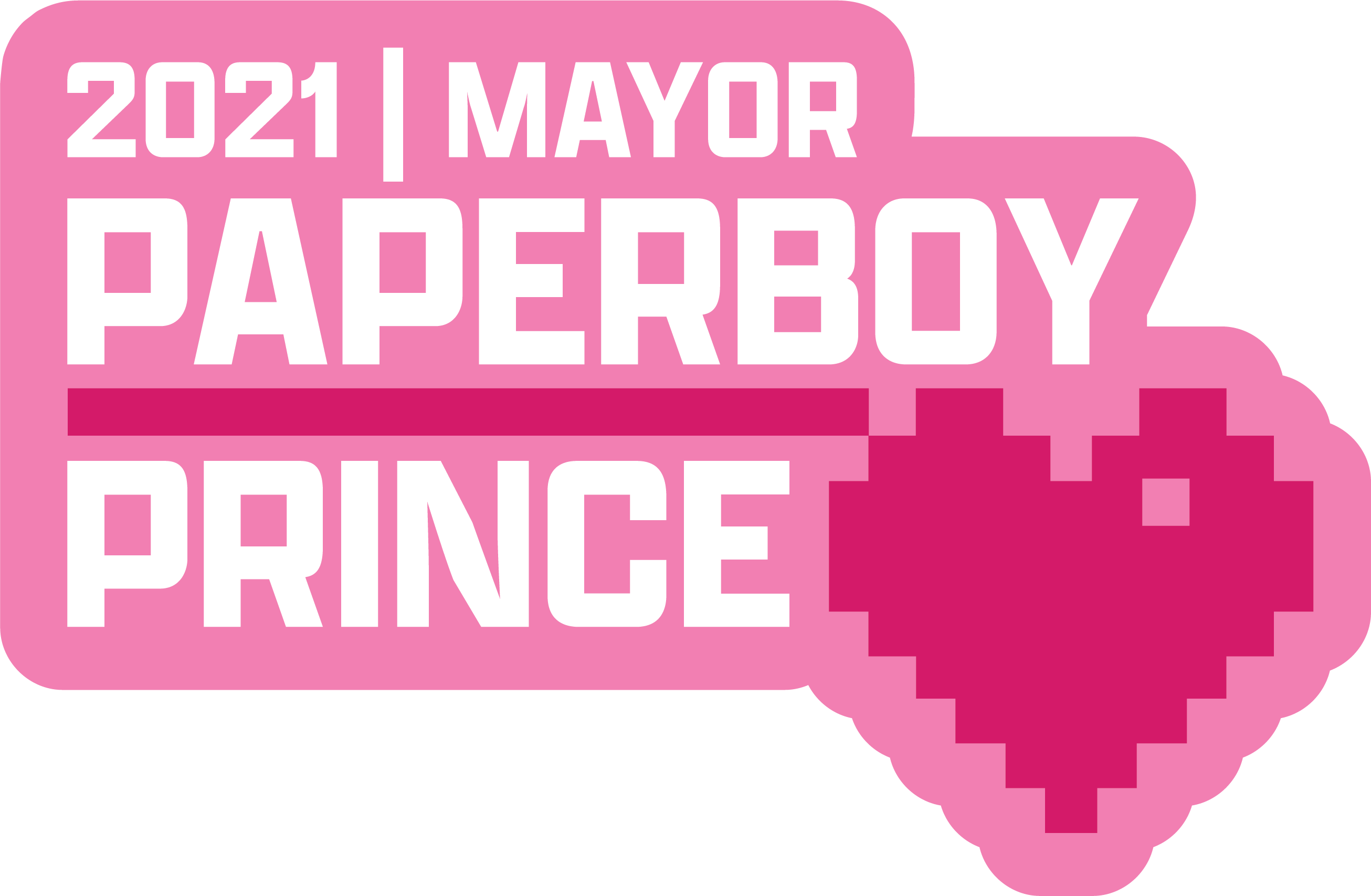
Paperboy Prince for the 2021 New York City Democratic mayoral primary

Paperboy Love Prince has been a candidate for multiple offices. As a perennial candidate, they started in politics by hosting concerts which provided voter registration for attendees. Prince supports the redirection of police funding to other programs. Prince hosts a community center called the Love Gallery on Myrtle Avenue in Bushwick, Brooklyn. A volunteer-run mutual aid food network is operated here.

=== Campaign for New York's 7th congressional district ===
In 2020, Prince was a candidate in the primary for New York's 7th congressional district competing against incumbent Nydia Velázquez. Prince received 20% of the vote to their opponent's 80%.

In Prince's campaign, their political platform included advocacy for universal basic income, Medicare for all, and spreading love. Some media portrayed Prince's campaign as a longshot. In preparation for the election, Prince overcame a challenge to their bid to appear on the ballot.

=== 2021 New York City mayoral campaign ===
In December 2020, Prince registered as a candidate for Mayor of New York City in the 2021 Democratic primary. If elected, Prince would have been the youngest mayor in the history of New York City.

Prince's campaign manager was a 13-year-old student Theo Demel, who believes that homework is unconstitutional. The campaign's goal was to raise $2 million. Part of the fundraising strategy included busking outside the Myrtle Avenue station in Bushwick, Brooklyn. The campaign's major policy points included fighting poverty and providing more housing for New York City residents. The campaign hosted weekly food distribution events, giving away food donated by churches to whoever happened to show up.

In May 2021, Prince challenged their electoral competitor Andrew Yang in both a basketball game and rap battle at Tompkins Square Park.

One of the criteria for joining the city's mayoral debates was fundraising a minimal amount of money. Prince was among the candidates who met the criteria to appear on the ballot, but did not meet the criteria to join the debates. While Prince was not inside the building to participate in mayoral debates, they were outside the venue on a bus known as the "Love Tank". Prince's performance outside the debate included singing about affordable housing.

A writer for Harvard Political Review said that Prince's campaign could shift discussion about what sorts of political policies are acceptable to discuss and also shift the perception of the electability of non-white candidates. A writer for The Red Hook Star-Revue said that Prince was a candidate to take seriously. That paper also endorsed Prince for mayor. Trevor Noah of The Daily Show showcased Prince's idea that police should reward people for doing good as an alternative to spotting violations. The City surveyed Prince on their political positions and published their responses.

Prince received 0.4% of the vote and was not elected.

=== 2022 campaigns ===
Following the 2021 election, Prince announced intent to seek candidacy in the 2022 elections for 11 congressional districts and the New York governorship. They again got on the ballot for congress in NY District 7.

=== 2023 New York 34th City Council District campaign ===
In 2023, Prince ran for the New York City's 34th City Council district and was endorsed by Chris Smalls and many other community leaders and artists.

=== 2024 presidential campaign ===
Prince was a candidate for the 2024 Democratic nomination for president, only appearing on the ballot in New Hampshire. They were not Constitutionally eligible to run in 2024 because they would not have reached the age of 35 by January 20, 2025, when the presidential term would have started.

=== 2025 New York City mayoral campaign ===
Paperboy Prince joined the campaign for mayor following their previous 2021 campaign for mayor. They continued to advocate for health care, abolishing the police, and universal basic income for New Yorkers. A key feature of their look for this campaign is clown makeup. On May 2 when they announced being on the ballot, they released their song "Utopia Plan" which presented their vision for New York City.

In late April, Brooklyn Democrats hosted a forum where they invited qualified candidates on the ballot to present, but they excluded Paperboy Prince from the invitation. Prince crashed the event wearing clown makeup and denounced the process which left them out. Some in the crowd asked for them to be ejected, and others advocated for them to be able to speak.

=== 2026 New York State Assembly campaign ===
They announced their candidacy for New York's 54th State Assembly district and New York's 7th congressional district in summer 2025.

== Music ==
By 2015, Paperboy Prince was a rapper and a center of attention among the fans at games of the basketball team Washington Wizards. They got recognition for their effort in organizing a music campaign to raise $20 million to bring DC-native basketball player Kevin Durant to the Wizards.

At the 2016 South by Southwest, Prince spoke to reporters on behalf of street performers on the condition that Prince could talk out loud on microphone, and that they got a hug.

Prince received death threats while performing music as Minister of Fun at an anti-Trump art production by LaBeouf, Rönkkö & Turner at the Museum of the Moving Image in the days after President Trump's inauguration.

In 2017, musician Azealia Banks established the record label Chaos & Glory Recordings, with Prince as the first artist signed to produce music.

== Personal life ==
Prince is non-binary and uses the pronouns they/them/their or the neopronouns god/goddess.

They dress as "royalty" to draw attention to how politicians can hold power for longer than kings or queens. In an interview with fashion magazine V, Prince explained how freedom in fashion encourages freedom in thinking and welcoming of diversity. They often wear a Game Boy Advance SP or Game Boy Color around their neck.

Prince's role models include Martin Luther King Jr. for his vision of racial justice.

== Electoral history ==
=== 2020 ===
New York's 7th congressional district 2020 Democratic primary results
Party	Candidate	Votes	%
Democratic	Nydia Velázquez (incumbent)	56,698	80.1
Democratic	Paperboy Prince	14,120	19.9
Total votes		70,818	100.0

=== 2021 ===
2021 New York City mayoral Democratic primary election
Candidate	Round 1		Round 2		Round 3		Round 4		Round 5		Round 6		Round 7		Round 8	
Candidate	Votes	%	Votes	%	Votes	%	Votes	%	Votes	%	Votes	%	Votes	%	Votes	%
Eric Adams	289,403	30.7%	289,603	30.8%	290,055	30.8%	291,806	31.2%	295,798	31.7%	317,092	34.6%	354,657	40.5%	Won 404,513	Won 50.4%
Kathryn Garcia	184,463	19.6%	184,571	19.6%	184,669	19.6%	186,731	19.9%	191,876	20.5%	223,634	24.4%	266,932	30.5%	397,316	49.6%
Maya Wiley	201,127	21.4%	201,193	21.4%	201,518	21.4%	206,013	22.0%	209,108	22.4%	239,174	26.1%	254,728	29.1%	Eliminated	
Andrew Yang	115,130	12.2%	115,301	12.2%	115,502	12.3%	118,808	12.6%	121,597	13.0%	135,686	14.8%	Eliminated			
Scott Stringer	51,778	5.5%	51,850	5.5%	51,951	5.5%	53,599	5.7%	56,723	6.1%	Eliminated					
Dianne Morales	26,495	2.8%	26,534	2.8%	26,645	2.8%	30,157	3.2%	30,933	3.3%	Eliminated					
Raymond McGuire	25,242	2.7%	25,272	2.7%	25,418	2.7%	26,361	2.8%	27,934	3.0%	Eliminated					
Shaun Donovan	23,167	2.5%	23,189	2.5%	23,314	2.5%	24,042	2.6%	Eliminated							
Aaron Foldenauer	7,742	0.8%	7,758	0.8%	7,819	0.8%	Eliminated									
Art Chang	7,048	0.7%	7,064	0.8%	7,093	0.8%	Eliminated									
Paperboy Prince	3,964	0.4%	4,007	0.4%	4,060	0.4%	Eliminated									
Joycelyn Taylor	2,662	0.3%	2,683	0.3%	2,780	0.3%	Eliminated									
Isaac Wright Jr.	2,242	0.2%	2,254	0.2%	Eliminated											
Write-ins	1,568	0.2%	Eliminated													
Inactive ballots	0 ballots		752 ballots		1,207 ballots		5,314 ballots		8,062 ballots		26,445 ballots		65,714 ballots		140,202 ballots	

=== 2022 ===
2022 New York's 7th congressional district Democratic Primary results
Party	Candidate	Votes	%
Democratic	Nydia Velázquez (incumbent)	21,470	84.3
Democratic	Paperboy Prince	4,006	15.7
Total votes		25,476	100.0

=== 2024 ===
New Hampshire Democratic primary, January 23, 2024
Candidate	Votes	%
Joe Biden (incumbent; write-in)	79,100	63.79
Dean Phillips	24,377	19.66
Marianne Williamson	5,016	4.05
Derek Nadeau	1,616	1.30
"Cease Fire" (write-in)	1,512	1.22
Vermin Supreme	912	0.74
John Vail	685	0.55
Robert F. Kennedy Jr. (write-in) (Ind.)	439	0.35
Donald Picard	371	0.30
Paperboy Prince	326	0.26
Paul V. LaCava	176	0.14
Jason Michael Palmer	142	0.11
President R. Boddie	136	0.11
Mark Stewart Greenstein	133	0.11
Bernie Sanders (write-in) (Ind.)	125	0.10
Terrisa Bukovinac	101	0.08
Gabriel Cornejo	86	0.07
Stephen P. Lyons	80	0.06
Frankie Lozada	73	0.06
Tom Koos	71	0.06
Armando "Mando" Perez-Serrato	68	0.05
Star Locke	59	0.05
Raymond Michael Moroz	52	0.04
Eban Cambridge	47	0.04
Richard Rist	37	0.03
Nikki Haley (write-in) (Republican)	4,760	3.84
Donald Trump (write-in) (Republican)	2,079	1.68
Chris Christie (write-in) (Republican)	41	0.03
Ron DeSantis (write-in) (Republican)	33	0.03
Vivek Ramaswamy (write-in) (Republican)	2	<0.01
Other write-in votes, reported as "Scatter".	1,341	1.08
Total	123,996	100%

No delegates were awarded from the January New Hampshire primary.

=== 2025 ===
2025 New York City Democratic mayoral primary
Candidate	Round 1		Round 2		Round 3	
Candidate	Votes	%	Votes	%	Votes	%
Zohran Mamdani	469,642	43.82%	469,755	43.86%	573,169	56.39%
Andrew Cuomo	387,137	36.12%	387,377	36.17%	443,229	43.61%
Brad Lander	120,634	11.26%	120,707	11.27%	Eliminated	
Adrienne Adams	44,192	4.12%	44,359	4.14%	Eliminated	
Scott Stringer	17,820	1.66%	17,894	1.67%	Eliminated	
Zellnor Myrie	10,593	0.99%	10,648	0.99%	Eliminated	
Whitney Tilson	8,443	0.79%	8,525	0.80%	Eliminated	
Michael Blake	4,366	0.41%	4,389	0.41%	Eliminated	
Jessica Ramos	4,273	0.40%	4,294	0.40%	Eliminated	
Paperboy Prince	1,560	0.15%	1,628	0.15%	Eliminated	
Selma Bartholomew	1,489	0.14%	1,505	0.14%	Eliminated	
Write-ins	1,581	0.15%	Eliminated			
Active votes	1,071,730	100.00%	1,071,081	99.94%	1,016,398	94.84%
Exhausted ballots	—N/a		649	0.06%	55,332	5.16%
Source: New York City Board of Elections
