= 2021 New York City Democratic mayoral primary =

- June 22, 2021
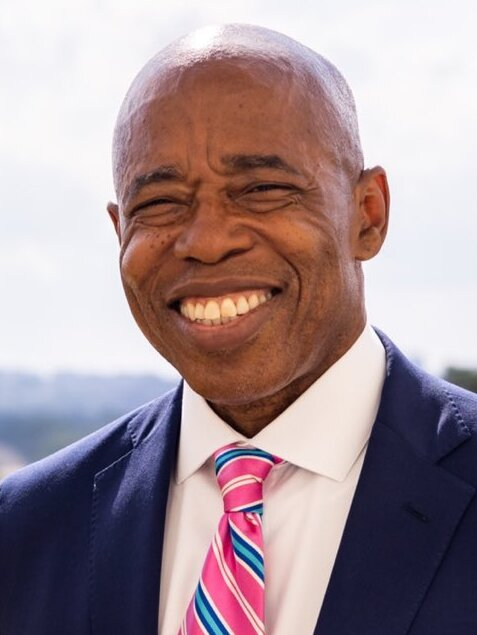

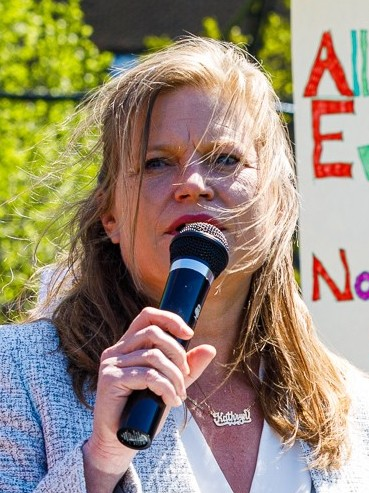

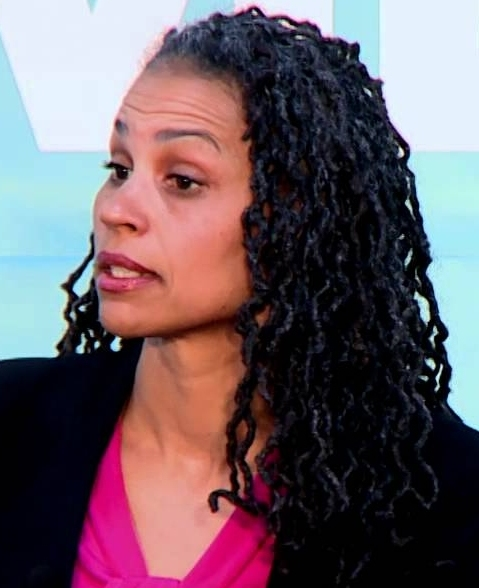

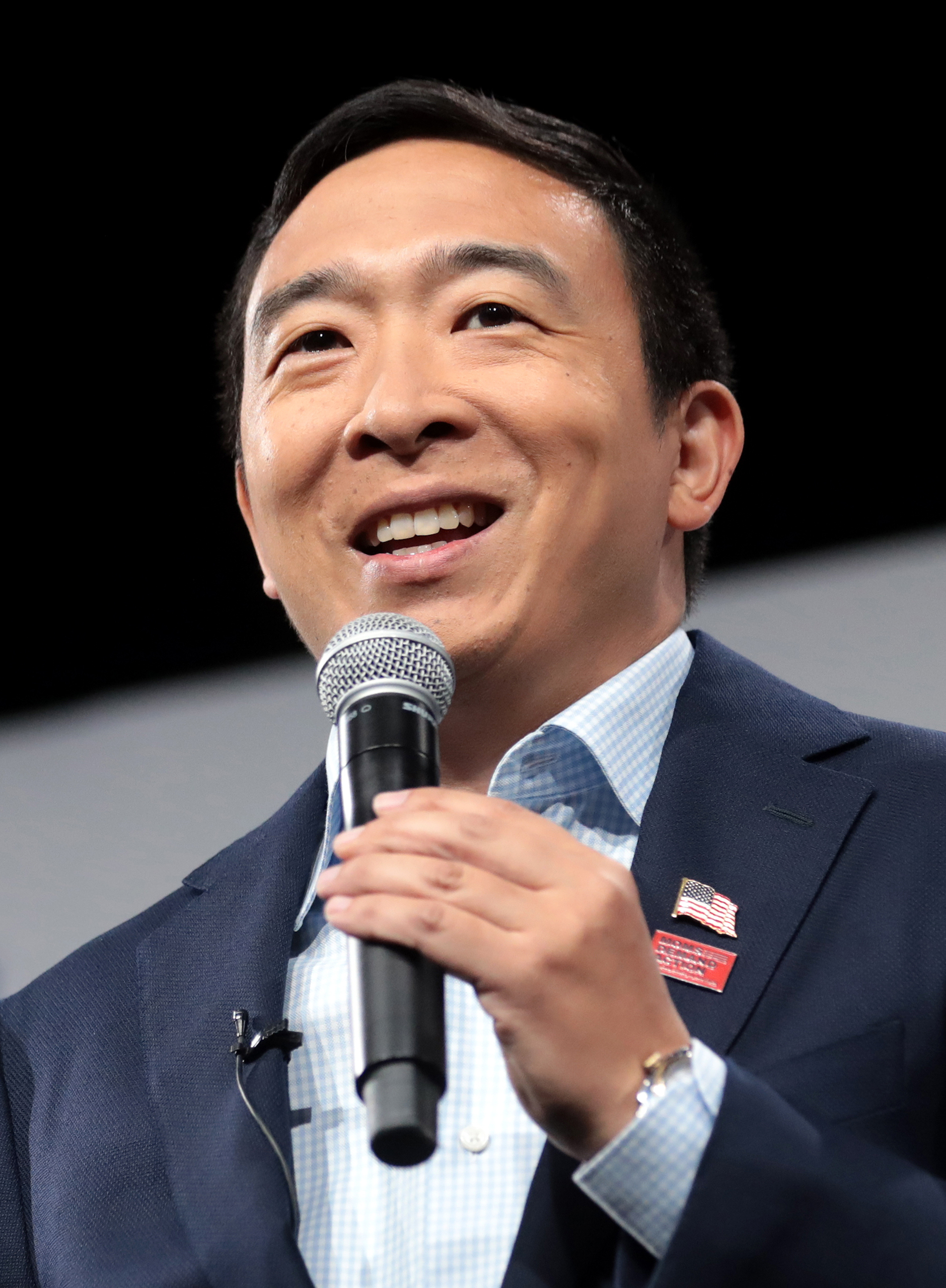

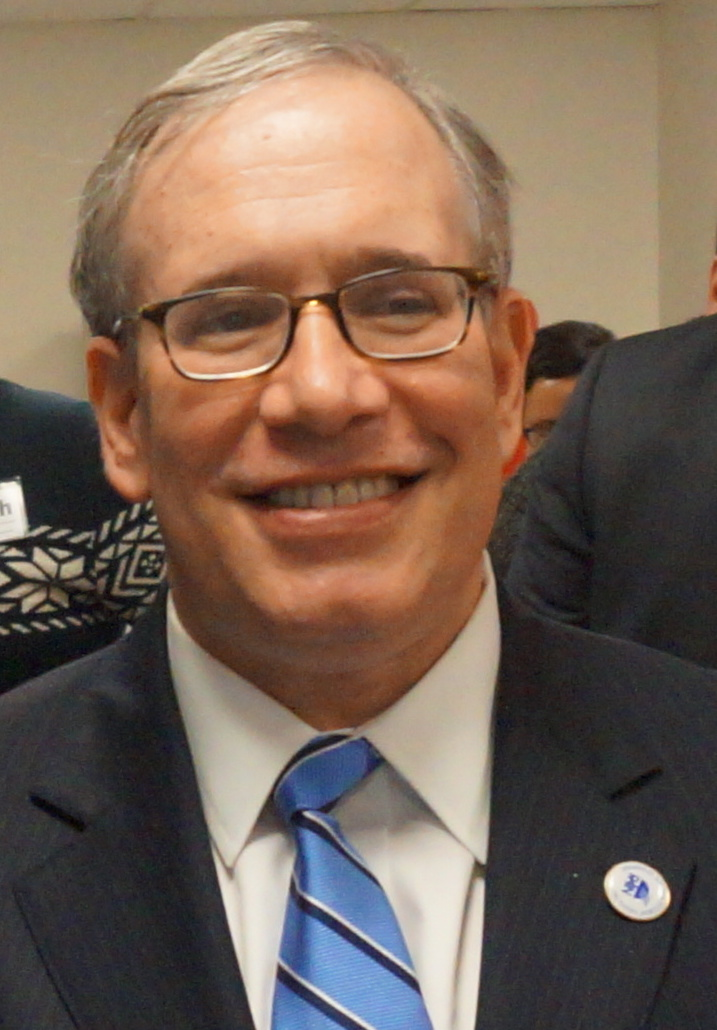
Candidate	Eric Adams	Kathryn Garcia	Maya Wiley
First round	289,403 (30.7%)	184,463 (19.6%)	201,193 (21.4%)
Final round	404,513 (50.4%)	397,316 (49.6%)	Eliminated
Candidate	Andrew Yang	Scott Stringer
First round	115,130 (12.2%)	51,778 (5.5%)
Final round	Eliminated	Eliminated
- Adams 10–20% 20–30% 30–40% 40–50% 50–60% 60–70% 70–80% 80–90% 90–100% Garcia 10–20% 20–30% 30–40% 40–50% 50–60% 60–70% 70–80% 80–90% 90–100% Wiley 10–20% 20–30% 30–40% 40–50% 50–60% 60–70% 70–80% 80–90% 90–100% Yang 10–20% 20–30% 30–40% 40–50% 50–60% 60–70% 70–80% 80–90% 90–100% Stringer 20–30% 30–40% 60–70% 90–100% Morales 60–70% 90–100% McGuire 20–30% 30–40% 40–50% 50–60% 90–100% Donovan 90–100% Tie <30% 30–40% 40–50% 50% No votes Adams 10–20% 20–30% 30–40% 40–50% 50–60% 60–70% 70–80% 80–90% 90–100% Garcia 10–20% 20–30% 30–40% 40–50% 50–60% 60–70% 70–80% 80–90% 90–100% Wiley 10–20% 20–30% 30–40% 40–50% 50–60% 60–70% 70–80% 80–90% 90–100% Yang 10–20% 20–30% 30–40% 40–50% 50–60% 60–70% 70–80% 80–90% 90–100% Stringer 20–30% 30–40% 60–70% 90–100% Morales 60–70% 90–100% McGuire 20–30% 30–40% 40–50% 50–60% 90–100% Donovan 90–100% Tie <30% 30–40% 40–50% 50% No votes Adams 50–60% 60–70% 70–80% 80–90% 90–100% Garcia 50–60% 60–70% 70–80% 80–90% 90–100% Tie 50% No votes Adams 50–60% 60–70% 70–80% 80–90% 90–100% Garcia 50–60% 60–70% 70–80% 80–90% 90–100% Tie 50% No votes
Previous Democratic nominee
Bill de Blasio
Democratic nominee
Eric Adams

The Democratic Party primary for the 2021 New York City mayoral election took place on June 22, 2021. Brooklyn Borough President Eric Adams defeated 12 other candidates, including Kathryn Garcia, Maya Wiley, and Andrew Yang. Adams went on to defeat Republican Curtis Sliwa and other candidates in the November 2, 2021 general election.

The New York City Board of Elections was substantially criticized for its handling of the race, the first after New York's initial implementation of ranked-choice voting (RCV). A week after election day, the board announced a discrepancy in the initial results, posting in a tweet that approximately 135,000 additional votes, originating from a test run, had been added to the total count.

== Background ==
In 2019, New York City voters passed Ballot Question #1 to amend the City Charter to "give voters the choice of ranking up to five candidates in primary and special elections for mayor, public advocate, comptroller, borough president, and city council beginning in January 2021". The first election in the city to use ranked-choice voting was in the 24th council district in Queens, which took place on February 2, 2021, though the first ranked-choice election with multiple rounds was held in the 31st council district in Queens on February 23. The 2021 mayoral primaries were the first New York City mayoral election primaries to use ranked-choice voting.

In 2019, journalists and political commentators predicted several potential candidates, including Brooklyn Borough President Eric Adams, Bronx Borough President Rubén Díaz Jr., NYC Council Speaker Corey Johnson, NYC Comptroller Scott Stringer, and NYC Public Advocate Jumaane Williams. All of the preceding candidates ended up joining the mayoral race with the exception of Williams, who instead decided to run for re-election as public advocate. Additionally, Díaz Jr. and Johnson dropped out before the primary election, with Johnson instead deciding to run for comptroller.

== Candidates ==
=== Major candidates ===
The following candidates (listed alphabetically) appeared on the Democratic primary ballot and had held office, had been included in polls, or had been the subject of significant media coverage.

Democratic primary candidates
Candidate	Experience	Announced	Withdrew	Ref
Eric Adams	Brooklyn Borough President (2014–2021); Former NY State Senator from the 20th district (2007–2013); Former NYPD captain	November 17, 2020 (Website)	—N/a	
Shaun Donovan	Former Director of the US Office of Management and Budget (2014–2017); Former US Secretary of housing and urban development (2009–2014); Former Commissioner of the NYC Department of Housing Preservation and Development (2004–2008)	February 3, 2020 (Website)	—N/a	
Kathryn Garcia	Former Commissioner of the NYC Department of Sanitation (2014–2020); Former Interim Chair and CEO of the NYC Housing Authority (2019); Former Chief Operating Officer of the NYC Department of Environmental Protection (2012–2014)	December 10, 2020 (Website)	July 7, 2021	
Raymond McGuire	Former Citigroup executive	October 15, 2020 (Website)	June 29, 2021	
Dianne Morales	Former social services non-profit CEO; Former teacher	November 19, 2020 Dianne Morales (Website)	July 2, 2021	
Scott Stringer	NYC Comptroller (2014–2021); Former Manhattan Borough President (2006–2013); Former NY State Assemblymember for the 67th district (1993–2005)	September 8, 2020 (Website)	June 27, 2021	
Maya Wiley	The New School professor Former chair of the NYC Civilian Complaint Review Board (2016–2017); Former counsel to Bill de Blasio; Former ACLU and NAACP Legal Defense Fund attorney	October 8, 2020 (Website)	July 7, 2021	
Andrew Yang	Candidate for President of the United States in 2020; Former Presidential Ambassador for Global Entrepreneurship (2015–2017); Founder of Venture for America	January 13, 2021 (Website)	June 22, 2021	

=== Other candidates qualifying for the ballot ===
- Art Chang, former JPMorgan Chase managing director, founder of NYC Votes
- Aaron Foldenauer, attorney
- Paperboy Love Prince, Brooklyn rapper
- Joycelyn Taylor, CEO of TaylorMade Contracting
- Isaac Wright Jr., lawyer

=== Write-in candidates who did not qualify for ballot access ===
- Eddie Cullen, tech entrepreneur and professor at Purdue University
- Ävatar Daví, tech entrepreneur and artist
- Thomas Downs, restaurant worker
- Guiddalia Emilien, real estate agent and small business owner
- Garry Guerrier, paramedic and nurse
- Max Kaplan, director of social media at Talent Resources
- Ira Seidman, data scientist
- Ahsan Syed, candidate for mayor in 2017

=== Withdrawn candidates ===
- Michael DeName, former independent US presidential candidate
- Rubén Díaz Jr., Bronx borough president (2009–2021), former NY state assemblymember (1997–2009) (endorsed Eric Adams)
- Quanda S. Francis, president of Sykes Capital Management (withdrew to run as an independent)
- Zach Iscol, entrepreneur, United States Marine Corps veteran (running for NYC comptroller; lost election)
- Corey Johnson, speaker of the NYC Council (2018–2021), NYC councilmember for the 3rd district (2014–present) (running for NYC comptroller; lost election)
- Carlos Menchaca, NYC councilmember for Brooklyn's 38th district (2013–2021) (endorsed Andrew Yang)
- Julia Qing Reaves, LGBT+ activist
- Stephen Bishop Seely, actor
- Loree Sutton, former commissioner of the NYC Department of Veterans' Services (2017–2019), former US Army brigadier general (endorsed Kathryn Garcia)

=== Declined ===
- Andy Byford, former president of the NYC Transit Authority (2018–2020)
- Melinda Katz, Queens County district attorney (2020–present), Queens borough president (2014–2020), NYC councilmember for the 29th district (2002–2009), NY state assemblymember for the 28th district (1994–1999)
- Melissa Mark-Viverito, former NYC Council speaker (2014–2017)
- Alexandria Ocasio-Cortez, US representative for New York's 14th congressional district (2019–present) (endorsed Maya Wiley)
- Christine Quinn, former NYC Council speaker (2006–2013)
- Max Rose, former US representative for New York's 11th congressional district (2019–2021) (formed exploratory committee but did not run)
- Ritchie Torres, US representative for New York's 15th congressional district (2021–present) (endorsed Andrew Yang)
- Jumaane Williams, NYC public advocate (2019–present), former NYC councilmember for the 45th district (2010–2019) (running for re-election as NYC public advocate) (endorsed Maya Wiley)
- Jeff Zucker, chairman of Warner Media News & Sports (2019–present)

== Campaign ==
=== Early months ===
Polling in late January and early February showed businessman Andrew Yang as the frontrunner, with Adams in second and Stringer in third place. As of January 20, 2021, of the major declared candidates, New York City Councilmember Carlos Menchaca and former Commissioner of the NYC Dept. of Veterans' Services Loree Sutton were considered the weakest candidates and most likely to drop out, as both of them posted very poor fundraising numbers. Sutton withdrew from the race on March 10, 2021 and Menchaca withdrew on March 24, 2021. By the middle of March, three candidates, Stringer, Dianne Morales, and Maya Wiley, were widely considered to be the chief competitors for the progressive vote. In April, Yang faced criticism when he appeared on a video by comedian Lawrence Reese in which he appeared to laugh when Reese asked him if he "choked bitches".

=== Stringer sexual assault allegations ===
In April, Stringer, who was generally polling in third place, was accused of sexual abuse by Jean Kim, who claimed that Stringer had forcibly kissed and groped her when she worked on his 2001 campaign for Public Advocate. Fellow candidates Morales, Adams, Yang, and Raymond McGuire condemned the acts in the allegation; while candidates Wiley, Kathryn Garcia, and Shaun Donovan called for him to drop out. Stringer denied the allegations, claiming that the relationship had been consensual. In June, a second woman accused him of sexual misconduct in 1992.

=== Debates ===
The first debate in the Democratic primary was sponsored by the Brooklyn Democratic Party and held on January 31, 2021. Eight candidates participated: Adams, former director of the US Office of Management and Budget Shaun Donovan, former commissioner of the NYC Dept. of Sanitation Kathryn Garcia, businessman Raymond McGuire, Stringer, Sutton, former counsel to Bill de Blasio Maya Wiley, and Yang. Former non-profit CEO Dianne Morales boycotted the debate following comments perceived as sinophobic by a former Brooklyn Democratic Party official.

The second debate took place on May 13, 2021. It was organized by the New York City Campaign Finance Board (CFB) and sponsored by NY1. Eight candidates met the CFB's qualifications to participate in the debate. Those who participated were Adams, Donovan, Garcia, McGuire, Morales, Stringer, Wiley, and Yang.

The third debate was held on June 2, 2021. It was organized by the CFB and sponsored by ABC 7. Eight candidates met the CFB's qualifications to participate in the debate. Those who participated were Adams, Donovan, Garcia, McGuire, Morales, Stringer, Wiley, and Yang.

The fourth debate was held on June 10, 2021, and sponsored by CBS 2. Five candidates participated: Adams, Garcia, Stringer, Wiley, and Yang. Adams initially announced that he would skip the debate but later opted to attend.

The fifth and final debate of the Democratic primary took place on June 16, 2021. It was organized by the CFB and was sponsored by NBC 4. Eight candidates met the CFB's qualifications and were required to participate: Adams, Donovan, Garcia, McGuire, Morales, Stringer, Wiley, and Yang.

2021 New York City mayoral election Democratic primary debates
No.	Date	Host	Moderator	Link	Participants								
Key: P Participant A Absent N Non-invitee I Invitee W Withdrawn													
Key: P Participant A Absent N Non-invitee I Invitee W Withdrawn					Eric Adams	Shaun Donovan	Kathryn Garcia	Raymond McGuire	Dianne Morales	Scott Stringer	Loree Sutton	Maya Wiley	Andrew Yang
1	Feb. 1, 2021	Kings County; Democratic Committee	Errol Louis	Video	P	P	P	P	A (Note: Morales was invited to the debate, but decided to boycott it in protest of actions within the Kings County Democratic Committee.)	P	P	P	P
2	May 13, 2021	John Jay College of Criminal Justice; NYC Votes; NY1	Brian Lehrer; Errol Louis; Josefa Velasquez	Video	P	P	P	P	P	P	W	P	P
3	Jun. 2, 2021	ABC 7 League of Women; Voters NYC; NAACP NYS; NYC Votes	Bill Ritter; Dave Evans; Yisel Tejada	Video	P	P	P	P	P	P	W	P	P
4	Jun. 10, 2021	CBS 2	Maurice DuBois; Marcia Kramer	Video	P (Note: Adams originally declined to participate, but later opted to attend.)	N	P	N	N	P	W	P	P
5	Jun. 16, 2021	NBC 4 Politico; NYC Votes	Sally Goldenberg; Melissa Russo; David Ushery; Allan Villafana	Video	P	P	P	P	P	P	W	P	P

=== Closing weeks ===
On May 5, 2021, Politico reported that a recent poll found that Eric Adams was leading the Democratic primary contest; this marked the first time since January that any Democratic candidate other than Yang had led in a public poll. On June 7, Spectrum News reported that Adams had maintained a lead in the Democratic primary.

In early May, Donovan and McGuire were characterized as being out of touch with everyday New Yorkers for greatly underestimating the median cost of a home in Brooklyn. In late May, Yang, who lives in Hell's Kitchen, faced some ridicule for answering that Times Square was his favorite subway station; the response was seen as akin to that of a tourist. Yang was also criticized as being out of touch when he appeared before the Stonewall Democrats of New York City for an endorsement screening, in which he appeared to point to his gay colleagues and supporter on the basis of their gender and sexuality rather than why they were important to him. Later in May, Morales's campaign lost three senior staff members amid allegations of a poor workplace culture and union-busting. Morales's campaign lost some endorsements and support.

In June, due to ongoing rumors that he lived in New Jersey, Adams invited reporters to Bedford-Stuyvesant to tour an apartment that he claimed was his residence.

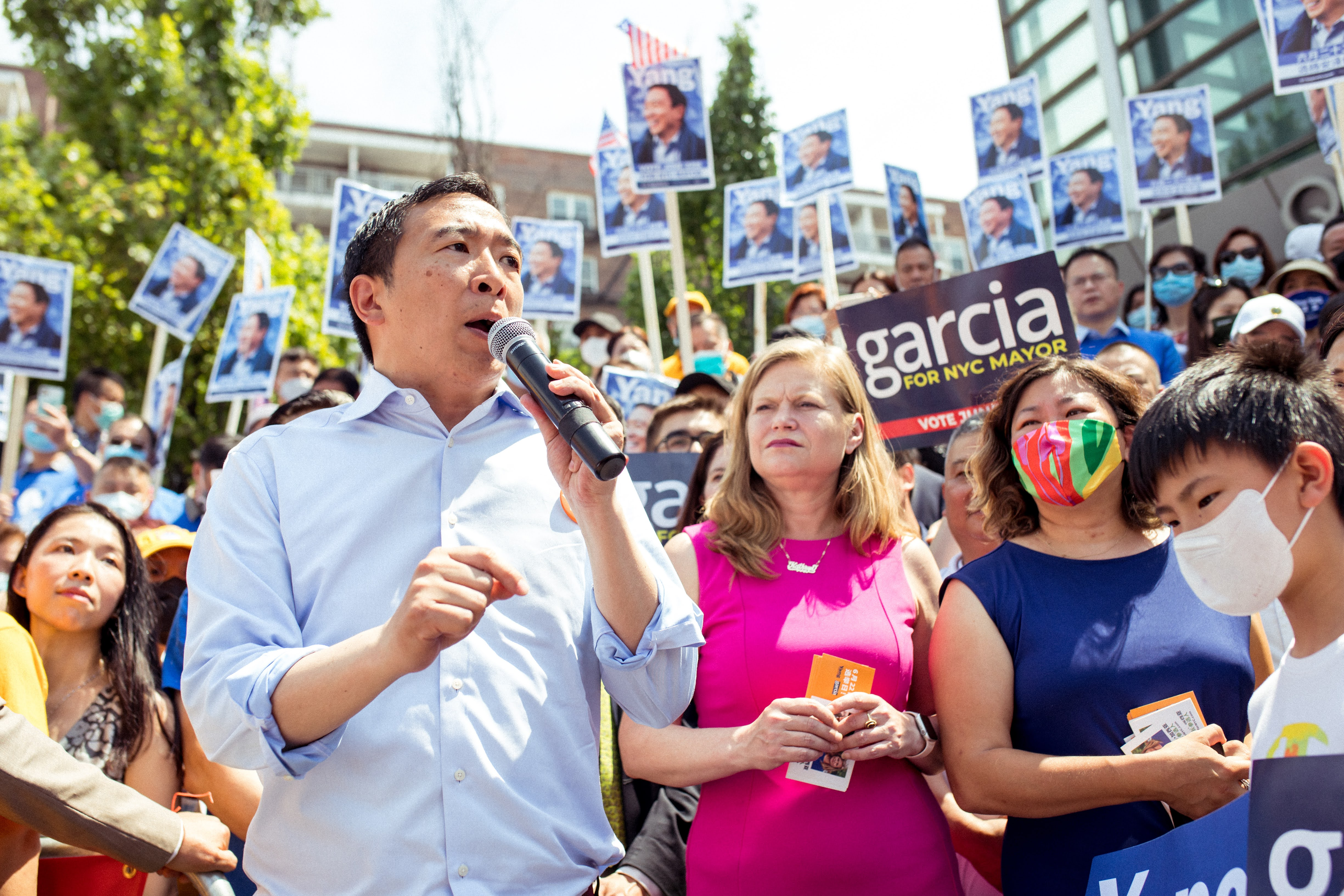
Andrew Yang and Kathryn Garcia held a joint campaign event in Flushing, Queens on June 19, 2021.

Yang asked his supporters to rank Garcia second, though she did not make a similar request of hers. Adams claimed the alliance was an attempt to disenfranchise Black and Latino voters, a claim that Garcia and Yang disputed, with rivals and officials such as Wiley and Williams claiming that Adams was using race to undermine confidence in the election.

== Endorsements ==
Eric Adams

US representatives

- Adriano Espaillat, US representative from New York's 13th congressional district (2017–present) (previously endorsed Stringer)
- Hakeem Jeffries, US representative from New York's 8th congressional district (2013–present), chair of the House Democratic Caucus (2019–2023) (second choice)
- Sean Patrick Maloney, US representative from New York's 18th congressional district (2013–2023), chair of the House of Representatives Democratic Congressional Campaign Committee (2021–2023)
- Gregory Meeks, US representative from New York's 5th congressional district (2013–present), chair of the House Foreign Affairs Committee (2021–present), US representative from New York's 6th congressional district (1998–2013), NY state assemblymember for the 31st district (1993–1998) (second choice)
- Thomas Suozzi, US representative from New York's 3rd congressional district (2017–2023), county executive of Nassau County (2002–2009)
- Ritchie Torres, US representative from New York's 15th congressional district (2021–present), NYC councilmember (2014–2020) (second choice)

State legislators

- Peter J. Abbate Jr., NY state assemblymember for the 49th district (1987–present)
- Joseph Addabbo Jr., NY state senator for the 15th district (2009–present)
- Stacey Pheffer Amato, NY state assemblymember for the 23rd district (2017–present)
- Jamaal Bailey, NY state senator for the 36th district (2017–present), chair of the Bronx County Democratic Committee (2020–present)
- Carmen De La Rosa, NY state assemblymember for the 72nd district (2017–present)
- Inez Dickens, NY state assemblymember for the 70th district (2017–present)
- Erik Dilan, NY state assemblymember for the 54th district (2015–present)
- Charles Fall, NY state assemblymember for the 61st district (2019–present) (co-endorsed with Donovan)
- Andrew Gounardes, NY state senator for the 22nd district (2019–present)
- Rodneyse Bichotte Hermelyn, NY state assemblymember for the 42nd district (2015–present), chair of the Kings County Democratic Committee (2020–present)
- Alicia Hyndman, NY state assemblymember for the 29th district (2016–present)
- Roxanne Persaud, NY state senator for the 19th district (2015–present)
- Jenifer Rajkumar, NY state assemblymember for the 38th district (2021–present)
- José Rivera, NY state assemblymember for the 78th district (2001–present)
- James Sanders Jr., NY state senator for the 10th district (2013–present)
- Diane Savino, NY state senator for the 23rd district (2005–present) (first choice)
- Clyde Vanel, NY state assemblymember for the 33rd district (2017–present)
- Jaime Williams, NY state assemblymember for the 59th district (2016–present)

Local officials

- Adrienne Adams, NYC councilmember (2017–present)
- Alicka Ampry-Samuel, NYC councilmember (2018–present)
- Diana Ayala, NYC councilmember (2018–present)
- Justin Brannan, NYC councilmember (2018–present)
- Selvena Brooks-Powers, NYC councilmember (2021–present)
- Laurie Cumbo, NYC councilmember (2014–present)
- Darma Diaz, NYC councilmember (2021–present)
- Rubén Díaz Jr., borough president of the Bronx (2009–present), former NY state assemblymember for the 85th district (2003–2009) & 75th district (1997–2002)
- Oswald Feliz, NYC councilmember (2021–present)
- Peter Koo, NYC councilmember (2010–present)
- Karen Koslowitz, NYC councilmember (2010–present)
- Farah Louis, NYC councilmember (2019–present)
- Alan Maisel, NYC councilmember (2014–present)
- Daneek Miller, NYC councilmember (2014–present)
- Francisco Moya, NYC councilmember (2018–present)
- Donovan Richards, borough president of Queens (2020–present), NYC councilmember (2014–2020)
- Kevin Riley, NYC councilmember (2021–present)
- Ydanis Rodríguez, NYC councilmember (2010–present)
- Debi Rose, NYC councilmember (2010–present)
- Rafael Salamanca, NYC councilmember (2016–present)

Individuals

- Ottis Anderson, former professional football player for the New York Giants and Super Bowl XXV MVP
- Karim Camara, former NY state assemblymember for the 43rd district (2005–2015)
- Fernando Ferrer, vice chairman of the Metropolitan Transportation Authority, 2005 Democratic nominee for mayor, former borough president of The Bronx (1987–2001)
- Taj Gibson, professional basketball player
- Dwight Gooden, former professional baseball all-star player for the New York Mets
- Aurelia Greene, former NY state assemblymember for the 77th district (1982–2009)
- Larry Holmes, former professional boxer
- Ed Kranepool, former professional baseball all-star player for the New York Mets
- Abner Louima, activist and victim of police violence in 1997 by NYPD
- Carl McCall, former NY state comptroller (1993–2002), former NY state senator for the 28th district (1975–1980)
- David Paterson, 55th governor of New York (2008–2010), former lieutenant governor of New York (2007–2008), former state senator (1985–2006)
- Charles Rangel, former US representative from New York's 13th congressional district (1971–2017)
- Norman Siegel, attorney and former executive director of the New York Civil Liberties Union
- Aaron Teitelbaum, one of two grand rebbes of Satmar
- Edolphus Towns, former US representative from New York's 10th congressional district (1983–2013)
- Angela Yee, radio personality

Organizations

- Citizens Union (second choice)
- Vulcan Society

Labor unions

- Amalgamated Transit Union Local 726-Staten Island, Local 1056-Flushing, Local 1179-Queens, Local 1181
- Civil Service Employees Association Local 1000
- District Council 37
- Council of Hotel Workers and Trades Professionals
- New York City District Council of Carpenters
- New York State Court Officers Association
- New York State Nurses Association (second choice)
- Office and Professional Employees International Union Local 153
- Public Employees Federation
- Service Employees International Union Local 32BJ
- Transport Workers Union Local 100
- Uniformed Fire Officers Association
- UNITE HERE Local 100

Newspapers

- The Chief-Leader (second choice)
- El Especialito
- The Irish Echo
- The Jewish Press
- Jewish Voice
- New York Daily News (second choice)
- Our Time Press
- Queens Chronicle
Shaun Donovan

US senators

- John Hickenlooper, US senator from Colorado (2021–present), governor of Colorado (2011–2019), mayor of Denver (2003–2011)

State legislators

- Michael Benedetto, NY state assemblymember for the 82nd district (2005–present)
- Charles Fall, NY state assemblymember for the 61st district (2019–present) (co-endorsed with Adams)

Local officials

- Fernando Cabrera, NYC councilmember (2010–present) (second choice)

Individuals

- Jay Carney, former White House press secretary (2011–2014)
- Manny Diaz, former mayor of Miami (2001–2009)
- Anthony Foxx, former US secretary of transportation (2013–2017), former mayor of Charlotte (2009–2013)
- Mitch Landrieu, former mayor of New Orleans (2010–2018)
- Edward Norton, actor
- Michael Nutter, former mayor of Philadelphia (2008–2016)
- Ashley Swearengin, former mayor of Fresno (2009–2017) (Republican)

Organizations

- 314 Action
Kathryn Garcia

US representatives

- Grace Meng, US representative from New York's 6th congressional district (2013–present), vice chair of the Democratic National Committee (2017–2021) (second choice)
- Nydia Velázquez, US representative from New York's 7th congressional district (1993–present) (second choice)

State legislators

- Liz Krueger, NY state senator for the 26th district (2002–2012) & 28th district (2013–present)
- Catherine Nolan, NY state assemblymember for the 37th district (1985–present)
- Daniel J. O'Donnell, NY state assemblymember for the 69th district (2003–present)
- Nily Rozic, NY state assemblymember for the 25th district (2013–present) (previously endorsed Stringer)
- Diane Savino, NY state senator (second choice)

Individuals

- Costa Constantinides, former NYC councilmember (2014–2021) (second choice)
- Clark Gregg, actor
- Loree Sutton, former commissioner of the NYC Department of Veterans’ Service (2017–2019), retired US Army brigadier general

Organizations

- Citizens Union (first choice)
- League of Conservation Voters New York affiliate

Labor unions

- SEIU Local 246, Local 444 – Sanitation Officers Association
- Teamsters Local 813, Local 831

Newspapers

- New York Daily News (first choice)
- The New York Times
Raymond McGuire

US representatives

- Gregory Meeks, US representative from New York's 5th congressional district (2013–present), chair of the House Foreign Affairs Committee (2021–present), US representative from New York's 6th congressional district (1998–2013), NY state assemblymember for the 31st district (1993–1998) (first choice)

State legislators

- Leroy Comrie, NY state senator for the 14th district (2015–present)
- Vivian E. Cook, NY state assemblymember for the 32nd district (1991–present)
- Robert J. Rodriguez, NY state assemblymember for the 68th district (2011–present)

Individuals

- Tiki Barber, former football player
- Gwen Carr, activist, author, and mother of Eric Garner
- Sean Combs, rapper and record executive
- Patrick Ewing, former basketball player
- Steve Israel, former US representative from New York's 3rd congressional district (2001–2017)
- Samuel L. Jackson, actor
- Valerie Jarrett, former director of the Office of Public Engagement and Intergovernmental Affairs (2009–2017), former senior advisor to the president (2009–2017)
- Jay-Z, rapper and record executive
- Spike Lee, filmmaker and actor
- LL Cool J, rapper
- Steve Martin, actor
- Nas, rapper
- Charles Oakley, former basketball player
- Charles Phillips, businessman
- Joseph Simmons, rapper

Organizations

- Stonewall Democratic Club of New York City (third choice)

Labor unions

- New York State Nurses Association (first choice)

Newspapers

- New York Daily News (third choice)
Dianne Morales

State legislators

- Jabari Brisport, NY state senator for the 25th district (2021–present) (first choice)
- ~~Harvey Epstein, NY state assemblymember for the 74th district (2018–present)~~ (Note: Withdrawn after allegations against Morales's campaign surfaced)
- Jessica González-Rojas, NY state assemblymember for the 34th district (2021–present)
- Marcela Mitaynes, NY state assemblymember for the 51st district (2021–present)
- ~~Gustavo Rivera, NY state senator for the 33rd district (2011–present)~~ (Note: Previously second choice to Stringer, then first choice after allegations of sexual assault against Stringer surfaced, then withdrawn after allegations against Morales's campaign surfaced)

Local officials

- Jimmy Van Bramer, NYC councilmember (2010–present) (previously endorsed Stringer, running for borough president of Queens)

Organizations

- Stonewall Democratic Club of New York City (second choice)
- ~~Sunrise Movement NYC~~ (Note: Previously co-endorsed with Stringer, changed to sole endorsement after allegations of sexual assault against Stringer surfaced, then withdrawn after allegations against Morales's campaign surfaced)
- ~~Working Families Party~~ (Note: Previously second choice to Stringer, changed to co-endorsement with Wiley after allegations of sexual assault against Stringer surfaced, then withdrawn after allegations against Morales's campaign surfaced)

Labor unions

- Professional Staff Congress (second choice)
- United Auto Workers Region 9A (second choice)

Notes

Scott Stringer

US representatives

- ~~Jamaal Bowman, US representative from New York's 16th congressional district (2021–present)~~ (Note: Withdrawn after sexual assault allegations against Stringer surfaced)
- ~~Adriano Espaillat, US representative from New York's 13th congressional district (2017–present)~~
- Jerry Nadler, US representative from New York's 10th congressional district (1992–present)

State legislators

- ~~Alessandra Biaggi, NY state senator for the 34th district (2019–present)~~
- ~~Jabari Brisport, NY state senator for the 25th district (2021–present)~~ (Note: Previously second choice, withdrawn after sexual assault allegations against Stringer surfaced)
- ~~Robert Carroll, NY state assemblymember for the 44th district~~
- ~~Catalina Cruz, NY state assemblymember for the 39th district (2019–present)~~
- ~~Maritza Davila, NY state assemblymember for the 53rd district (2013–present)~~
- ~~Carmen De La Rosa, NY state assemblymember for the 72nd district (2017–present), 2021 candidate for NYC councilmember~~
- Mathylde Frontus, NY state assemblymember for the 46th district (2018–present)
- Richard N. Gottfried, NY state assemblymember for the 75th district (1971–present)
- ~~Robert Jackson, NY state senator for the 31st district (2019–present)~~
- Brian P. Kavanagh, NY state senator for the 26th district (2017–present)
- ~~Yuh-Line Niou, NY state assemblymember for the 65th district (2017–present)~~
- N. Nick Perry, NY state assemblymember for the 58th district (1993–present)
- ~~Jessica Ramos, NY state senator for the 13th district (2019–present)~~
- Diana Richardson, NY state assemblymember for the 43rd district (2015–present)
- ~~Gustavo Rivera, NY state senator for the 33rd district (2011–present)~~
- Linda Rosenthal, NY state assemblymember for the 67th district (2006–present)
- ~~Nily Rozic, NY state assemblymember for the 25th district (2013–present)~~
- ~~Julia Salazar, NY state senator for the 18th district (2019–present)~~
- Rebecca Seawright, NY state assemblymember for the 76th district (2015–present)
- ~~Amanda Septimo, NY state assemblymember for the 84th district (2021–present)~~
- ~~José M. Serrano, NY state senator for the 29th district (2005–present)~~
- Al Taylor, NY state assemblymember for the 71st district (2017–present)

Local officials

- ~~Diana Ayala, NYC councilmember (2018–present)~~
- ~~Mark Levine, NYC councilmember (2014–present)~~
- ~~Jimmy Van Bramer, NYC councilmember (2010–present)~~

Individuals

- Costa Constantinides, former NYC councilmember (2014–2021) (first choice)
- Phil Goldfeder, former NY state assemblymember for the 23rd district (2011–2016)
- Scarlett Johansson, actress
- Bill McKibben, environmental activist
- Ruth Messinger, former borough president of Manhattan (1990–1998)

Organizations

- Citizens Union (third choice)
- ~~Food & Water Action~~
- ~~New York Communities for Change~~
- Stonewall Democratic Club of New York City (first choice) (voted on May 5, 2021 to withdraw endorsement after sexual assault allegations against Stringer surfaced but failed to get 2/3 majority)
- ~~Sunrise Movement NYC~~ (Note: Previously co-endorsed with Morales, withdrawn after sexual assault allegations against Stringer surfaced)
- ~~Working Families Party~~

Labor unions

- Communications Workers of America District 1
- Council of School Supervisors & Administrators
- International Brotherhood of Electrical Workers Local 3
- International Union of Painters and Allied Trades District Council 9
- Laborers' International Union of North America
- Professional Staff Congress (first choice)
- Retail, Wholesale and Department Store Union
- Sheet Metal Workers Local 28
- United Auto Workers Region 9A
- United Federation of Teachers
- ~~United Food and Commercial Workers Local 1500~~

Notes

Loree Sutton (withdrew)

Individuals

- Kenneth Fisher, businessman
Maya Wiley

US senators

- Elizabeth Warren, US senator from Massachusetts (2013–present)

US representatives

- Jamaal Bowman, US representative from New York's 16th congressional district (2021–present) (previously endorsed Stringer)
- Yvette Clarke, US representative from New York's 9th congressional district (2006–present)
- Hakeem Jeffries, US representative from New York's 8th congressional district (2013–present), chair of the House Democratic Caucus (2019–present) (first choice)
- Alexandria Ocasio-Cortez, US representative from New York's 14th congressional district (2019–present)
- Katie Porter, US representative from California's 45th congressional district (2019–present)
- Nydia Velázquez, US representative from New York's 7th congressional district (1993–present)

State legislators

- Khaleel Anderson, NY state assemblymember for the 31st district (2020–present)
- Jeffrion L. Aubry, NY state assemblymember for the 35th district (1992–present)
- Maritza Davila, NY state assemblymember for the 53rd district (2013–present) (previously endorsed Stringer)
- Emily Gallagher, NY state assemblymember for the 50th district (2021–present)
- Michael Gianaris, NY state senator for the 12th district (2011–present)
- Deborah Glick, NY state assemblymember for the 66th district (1991–present)
- Latoya Joyner, NY state assemblymember for the 77th district (2015–present)
- Julia Salazar, NY state senator for the 18th district (2019–present) (previously endorsed Stringer)

Local officials

- Stephen Levin, NYC councilmember (2010–present)
- Helen Rosenthal, NYC councilmember (2016–present)
- Jumaane Williams, New York City public advocate (2019–present), NYC councilmember (2010–2019)

Individuals

- Tichina Arnold, actress
- Michael Blake, former NY state assemblymember for the 79th district (2015–2021)
- Yvette Nicole Brown, actress
- Julian Castro, former HUD secretary (2014–2017), former Mayor of San Antonio (2009–2014), former San Antonio City Council member (2001–2005)
- Chris Evans, actor
- Jonathan Frakes, actor and director
- Kathy Griffin, comedian and actress
- Melissa Harris-Perry, writer, television host, and political commentator
- Alyssa Milano, actress
- Rosie O'Donnell, comedian and actress
- Patton Oswalt, actor
- The Strokes, rock band
- Gabrielle Union, actress
- James Vacca, former NYC councilmember (2006–2017)

Organizations

- Democracy for America
- EMILY's List
- Freelancers Union (co-endorsed with Yang)
- Our Revolution
- Working Families Party (previously third choice to Stringer and Morales, changed to co-endorsement with Morales after allegations of sexual assault against Stringer surfaced, then changed to first place after allegations against Morales's campaign surfaced)

Labor unions

- Service Employees International Union Local 1199
Isaac Wright Jr.

Individuals

- 50 Cent, rapper, television producer, and actor
- Fat Joe, rapper and actor
Andrew Yang

US representatives

- Grace Meng, US representative from New York's 6th congressional district (2013–present), vice chair of the Democratic National Committee (2017–2021)
- Ritchie Torres, US representative from New York's 15th congressional district (2021–present), NYC councilmember (2014–2020) (first choice)

State legislators

- Kenny Burgos, NY state assemblymember for the 85th district (2020–present)
- Jeremy Cooney, NY state senator for the 58th district (2021–present)
- Michael Cusick, NY state assemblymember for the 63rd district (2003–present), chair of the Richmond County Democratic Committee (2019–present)
- Simcha Eichenstein, NY state assemblymember for the 48th district (2019–present)
- Ron Kim, NY state assemblymember for the 40th district (2013–present)
- John Liu, NY state senator for the 11th district (2019–present), former NYC comptroller (2010–2013), former NYC Councilmember (2002–2009)
- Daniel Rosenthal, NY state assemblymember for the 27th district (2017–present)
- Toby Ann Stavisky, NY state senator for the 16th district (1999–present)
- Maritza Davila, NY state assemblymember (2013–present) (second choice)

Local officials

- Margaret Chin, NYC councilmember (2010–present)
- Vanessa Gibson, NYC councilmember (2014–present), NY State Assemblymember for the 77th district (2009–2013)
- Stephen Levin, NYC councilmember (2010–present) (second choice)
- Carlos Menchaca, NYC councilmember (2014–present) (endorsed after withdrawing from the race)
- Kalman Yeger, NYC councilmember (2018–present)

Individuals

- Sal Albanese, former NYC councilmember (1983–1998)
- Charlamagne tha God, radio presenter and television personality
- Elizabeth Crowley, former NYC councilmember (2009–2017)
- Matthew W. Daus, former commissioner and chairman of the New York City Taxi and Limousine Commission (2001–2010)
- Ben Zion Aryeh Leibish Halberstam, current leader of the Bobov Hasidic dynasty
- Cameron Kasky, activist against gun violence
- Dara Kass, physician and professor
- Daniel Dae Kim, actor and producer
- Martin Luther King III, civil rights activist, former president of the Southern Christian Leadership Conference (1997–2004)
- John Leguizamo, actor and comedian
- Walter T. Mosley, former NY state assemblymember for the 57th district (2013–2021)
- Naked Cowboy, street performer
- David S. Rose, entrepreneur
- Anthony Scaramucci, former White House communications director (2017) (Republican)
- Amy Schumer, stand-up comedian and actress
- Lis Smith, communications director for Pete Buttigieg's 2020 presidential campaign
- Zalman Teitelbaum, grand rebbe of Satmar
- Bradley Tusk, businessman, philanthropist, and political strategist
- Mordechai Dovid Unger, first rebbe of Bobov-45

Organizations

- AAPI Victory Fund
- Freelancers Union (co-endorsed with Wiley)

Labor unions

- Detectives' Endowment Association
- New York City Police Captains Endowment Association

Newspapers and other media

- The Queens Ledger

== Opinion polling ==
==== Graphical summary (first-past-the-post polls) ====
View source data.

Among those supporting a candidate (first-past-the-post polls)

View source data.

==== Ranked-choice polls ====
Poll source	Date(s) administered	Sample size (Note: Key: A – all adults RV – registered voters LV – likely voters V – unclear)	Margin of error	RCV count	Eric Adams	Shaun Donovan	Kathryn Garcia	Raymond McGuire	Dianne Morales	Scott Stringer	Maya Wiley	Andrew Yang	Others	Undecided
Data for Progress (D)	Jun 18–20, 2021	1,354 (LV)	± 3.0%	BA (Note: Before allocation (including undecided respondents))	26%	3%	18%	3%	2%	5%	21%	12%	2%	6%
Data for Progress (D)	Jun 18–20, 2021	1,354 (LV)	± 3.0%	1	28%	3%	19%	4%	2%	5%	22%	13%	3%	–
Data for Progress (D)	Jun 18–20, 2021	1,354 (LV)	± 3.0%	2	28%	3%	20%	4%	3%	5%	23%	13%	–	–
Data for Progress (D)	Jun 18–20, 2021	1,354 (LV)	± 3.0%	3	28%	3%	20%	4%	–	6%	24%	14%	–	–
Data for Progress (D)	Jun 18–20, 2021	1,354 (LV)	± 3.0%	4	29%	–	21%	4%	–	6%	25%	14%	–	–
Data for Progress (D)	Jun 18–20, 2021	1,354 (LV)	± 3.0%	5	30%	–	24%	–	–	6%	25%	14%	–	–
Data for Progress (D)	Jun 18–20, 2021	1,354 (LV)	± 3.0%	6	32%	–	26%	–	–	–	27%	15%	–	–
Data for Progress (D)	Jun 18–20, 2021	1,354 (LV)	± 3.0%	7	38%	–	31%	–	–	–	31%	–	–	–
Data for Progress (D)	Jun 18–20, 2021	1,354 (LV)	± 3.0%	8	54%	–	–	–	–	–	46%	–	–	–
Data for Progress (D)	Jun 18–20, 2021	1,354 (LV)	± 3.0%	8 (Note: Hypothetical scenario with Wiley eliminated instead of Garcia after round 7)	48%	–	52%	–	–	–	–	–	–	–
Citizen Data (Note: This poll was sponsored by FairVote)	Jun 14–17, 2021	800 (LV)	± 3.5%	1	32%	5%	18%	3%	6%	6%	18%	11%	2%	–
Citizen Data	Jun 14–17, 2021	800 (LV)	± 3.5%	2	32%	5%	18%	3%	6%	6%	18%	12%	–	–
Citizen Data	Jun 14–17, 2021	800 (LV)	± 3.5%	3	33%	5%	18%	–	6%	7%	19%	12%	–	–
Citizen Data	Jun 14–17, 2021	800 (LV)	± 3.5%	4	34%	–	19%	–	6%	7%	20%	13%	–	–
Citizen Data	Jun 14–17, 2021	800 (LV)	± 3.5%	5	36%	–	20%	–	–	8%	21%	15%	–	–
Citizen Data	Jun 14–17, 2021	800 (LV)	± 3.5%	6	37%	–	22%	–	–	–	26%	15%	–	–
Citizen Data	Jun 14–17, 2021	800 (LV)	± 3.5%	7	44%	–	28%	–	–	–	28%	–	–	–
Citizen Data	Jun 14–17, 2021	800 (LV)	± 3.5%	8	56%	–	–	–	–	–	44%	–	–	–
Citizen Data	Jun 14–17, 2021	800 (LV)	± 3.5%	8 (Note: Hypothetical scenario based on FairVote's RCV simulations with various permutations of candidates)	54%	–	46%	–	–	–	–	–	–	–
Citizen Data	Jun 14–17, 2021	800 (LV)	± 3.5%	8	67%	–	–	–	–	–	–	33%	–	–
Citizen Data	Jun 14–17, 2021	800 (LV)	± 3.5%	8	–	–	51%	–	–	–	49%	–	–	–
Citizen Data	Jun 14–17, 2021	800 (LV)	± 3.5%	8	–	–	60%	–	–	–	–	40%	–	–
Citizen Data	Jun 14–17, 2021	800 (LV)	± 3.5%	8	–	–	–	–	–	–	59%	41%	–	–
Ipsos	Jun 10–17, 2021	702 (LV)	± 5.7%	BA	28%	5%	15%	5%	1%	8%	13%	20%	–	6%
Ipsos	Jun 10–17, 2021	702 (LV)	± 5.7%	1	29%	5%	16%	5%	1%	8%	13%	21%	–	
Ipsos	Jun 10–17, 2021	702 (LV)	± 5.7%	2	29%	5%	16%	5%	–	8%	14%	22%	–	
Ipsos	Jun 10–17, 2021	702 (LV)	± 5.7%	3	31%	7%	16%	–	–	9%	14%	22%	–	
Ipsos	Jun 10–17, 2021	702 (LV)	± 5.7%	4	34%	–	17%	–	–	12%	15%	23%	–	
Ipsos	Jun 10–17, 2021	702 (LV)	± 5.7%	5	36%	–	20%	–	–	–	16%	27%	–	
Ipsos	Jun 10–17, 2021	702 (LV)	± 5.7%	6	43%	–	25%	–	–	–	–	31%	–	
Ipsos	Jun 10–17, 2021	702 (LV)	± 5.7%	7	56%	–	–	–	–	–	–	44%	–	
Emerson College (Note: This poll was sponsored by WPIX and NewsNation)	Jun 15–16, 2021	664 (LV)	± 3.7%	BA	23%	2%	17%	3%	2%	9%	18%	14%	1% Chang: 1% Foldenauer: 0% Prince: 0% Taylor: 0% Wright: 0%	10%
Emerson College	Jun 15–16, 2021	664 (LV)	± 3.7%	2	26%	3%	19%	4%	2%	10%	20%	15%	1% Chang: 1% Prince: 0%	–
Emerson College	Jun 15–16, 2021	664 (LV)	± 3.7%	3	26%	3%	19%	4%	2%	10%	20%	15%	1% Chang: 1%	–
Emerson College	Jun 15–16, 2021	664 (LV)	± 3.7%	4	26%	3%	20%	4%	2%	10%	21%	15%	–	–
Emerson College	Jun 15–16, 2021	664 (LV)	± 3.7%	5	26%	3%	20%	4%	–	10%	22%	15%	–	–
Emerson College	Jun 15–16, 2021	664 (LV)	± 3.7%	6	27%	–	21%	5%	–	10%	22%	15%	–	–
Emerson College	Jun 15–16, 2021	664 (LV)	± 3.7%	7	29%	–	21%	–	–	11%	22%	17%	–	–
Emerson College	Jun 15–16, 2021	664 (LV)	± 3.7%	8	32%	–	25%	–	–	–	26%	18%	–	–
Emerson College	Jun 15–16, 2021	664 (LV)	± 3.7%	9	41%	–	30%	–	–	–	29%	–	–	–
Emerson College	Jun 15–16, 2021	664 (LV)	± 3.7%	10	52%	–	48%	–	–	–	–	–	–	–
Change Research (D) (Note: This poll was sponsored by New Generation of Leadership PAC, which supports Garcia for mayor)	Jun 11–14, 2021	822 (LV)	± 3.4%	BA	23%	4%	19%	3%	1%	8%	19%	12%	0% Chang: 0% Foldenauer: 0% Prince: 0% Taylor: 0% Wright: 0%	10%
Change Research (D)	Jun 11–14, 2021	822 (LV)	± 3.4%	2	26%	4%	22%	3%	2%	9%	21%	13%	1% Wright: 1% Chang: 0% Prince: 0%	–
Change Research (D)	Jun 11–14, 2021	822 (LV)	± 3.4%	3	26%	4%	22%	3%	2%	9%	21%	13%	1% Wright: 1% Chang: 0%	–
Change Research (D)	Jun 11–14, 2021	822 (LV)	± 3.4%	4	26%	4%	22%	3%	2%	9%	21%	13%	1% Wright: 1%	–
Change Research (D)	Jun 11–14, 2021	822 (LV)	± 3.4%	5	26%	5%	22%	3%	2%	9%	21%	13%	–	–
Change Research (D)	Jun 11–14, 2021	822 (LV)	± 3.4%	6	26%	5%	22%	3%	–	9%	22%	13%	–	–
Change Research (D)	Jun 11–14, 2021	822 (LV)	± 3.4%	7	27%	5%	22%	–	–	10%	23%	14%	–	–
Change Research (D)	Jun 11–14, 2021	822 (LV)	± 3.4%	8	28%	–	23%	–	–	10%	23%	16%	–	–
Change Research (D)	Jun 11–14, 2021	822 (LV)	± 3.4%	9	30%	–	27%	–	–	–	26%	17%	–	–
Change Research (D)	Jun 11–14, 2021	822 (LV)	± 3.4%	10	37%	–	33%	–	–	–	30%	–	–	–
Change Research (D)	Jun 11–14, 2021	822 (LV)	± 3.4%	11	49%	–	51%	–	–	–	–	–	–	–
Schoen Cooperman Research (D) (Note: This poll was sponsored by Strong Leadership NYC, Inc., which supports Adams for mayor)	Jun 10–13, 2021	1,000 (LV)	± 3.1%	BA	22%	6%	14%	4%	4%	9%	16%	18%	0%	7%
Schoen Cooperman Research (D)	Jun 10–13, 2021	1,000 (LV)	± 3.1%	1	24%	7%	15%	5%	4%	9%	17%	19%	–	
Schoen Cooperman Research (D)	Jun 10–13, 2021	1,000 (LV)	± 3.1%	2	24%	7%	16%	5%	–	10%	18%	20%	–	
Schoen Cooperman Research (D)	Jun 10–13, 2021	1,000 (LV)	± 3.1%	3	24%	8%	17%	–	–	10%	19%	22%	–	
Schoen Cooperman Research (D)	Jun 10–13, 2021	1,000 (LV)	± 3.1%	4	26%	–	18%	–	–	11%	21%	24%	–	
Schoen Cooperman Research (D)	Jun 10–13, 2021	1,000 (LV)	± 3.1%	5	31%	–	20%	–	–	–	23%	26%	–	
Schoen Cooperman Research (D)	Jun 10–13, 2021	1,000 (LV)	± 3.1%	6	40%	–	–	–	–	–	28%	32%	–	
Schoen Cooperman Research (D)	Jun 10–13, 2021	1,000 (LV)	± 3.1%	7	55%	–	–	–	–	–	–	45%	–	
Public Opinion Strategies (R) (Note: This poll was sponsored by the Manhattan Institute for Policy Research)	Jun 9–13, 2021	500 (LV)	± 4.4%	BA	21%	4%	20%	2%	2%	8%	18%	13%	2% Chang: 1% Taylor: 1% Prince: <1% Foldenauer: 0% Wright: 0%	9%
Public Opinion Strategies (R)	Jun 9–13, 2021	500 (LV)	± 4.4%	1	24%	4%	22%	2%	2%	9%	20%	14%	3% Chang: 1% Prince: 1% Taylor: 1% Foldenauer: 0% Wright: 0%	–
Public Opinion Strategies (R)	Jun 9–13, 2021	500 (LV)	± 4.4%	2	24%	4%	22%	2%	2%	9%	20%	14%	3% Chang: 1% Prince: 1% Taylor: 1% Foldenauer: 0%	–
Public Opinion Strategies (R)	Jun 9–13, 2021	500 (LV)	± 4.4%	3	24%	4%	22%	2%	2%	9%	20%	14%	2% Chang: 1% Taylor: 1%	–
Public Opinion Strategies (R)	Jun 9–13, 2021	500 (LV)	± 4.4%	4	24%	4%	22%	2%	3%	9%	20%	14%	1% Chang: 1%	–
Public Opinion Strategies (R)	Jun 9–13, 2021	500 (LV)	± 4.4%	5	25%	4%	22%	2%	3%	9%	21%	14%	–	–
Public Opinion Strategies (R)	Jun 9–13, 2021	500 (LV)	± 4.4%	6	25%	4%	22%	–	3%	9%	21%	15%	–	–
Public Opinion Strategies (R)	Jun 9–13, 2021	500 (LV)	± 4.4%	7	26%	4%	23%	–	–	9%	22%	15%	–	–
Public Opinion Strategies (R)	Jun 9–13, 2021	500 (LV)	± 4.4%	8	27%	–	25%	–	–	10%	23%	15%	–	–
Public Opinion Strategies (R)	Jun 9–13, 2021	500 (LV)	± 4.4%	9	29%	–	28%	–	–	–	25%	17%	–	–
Public Opinion Strategies (R)	Jun 9–13, 2021	500 (LV)	± 4.4%	10	38%	–	33%	–	–	–	29%	–	–	–
Public Opinion Strategies (R)	Jun 9–13, 2021	500 (LV)	± 4.4%	11	48%	–	52%	–	–	–	–	–	–	–
Honan Strategy Group (D) (Note: This poll was sponsored by the NYC-based lobbying group Capalino & Company, which is not working on behalf of any candidates)	May 26 – Jun 10, 2021	950 (LV)	± 3.2%	BA	28%	9%	13%	1%	1%	6%	7%	19%	–	16%
Honan Strategy Group (D)	May 26 – Jun 10, 2021	950 (LV)	± 3.2%	1	33%	11%	15%	1%	1%	7%	9%	23%	–	
Honan Strategy Group (D)	May 26 – Jun 10, 2021	950 (LV)	± 3.2%	2	33%	11%	16%	1%	–	7%	9%	23%	–	
Honan Strategy Group (D)	May 26 – Jun 10, 2021	950 (LV)	± 3.2%	3	34%	11%	16%	–	–	7%	9%	23%	–	
Honan Strategy Group (D)	May 26 – Jun 10, 2021	950 (LV)	± 3.2%	4	35%	12%	17%	–	–	–	11%	25%	–	
Honan Strategy Group (D)	May 26 – Jun 10, 2021	950 (LV)	± 3.2%	5	39%	13%	19%	–	–	–	–	29%	–	
Honan Strategy Group (D)	May 26 – Jun 10, 2021	950 (LV)	± 3.2%	6	44%	–	24%	–	–	–	–	33%	–	
Honan Strategy Group (D)	May 26 – Jun 10, 2021	950 (LV)	± 3.2%	7	56%	–	–	–	–	–	–	44%	–	
Marist College (Note: This poll was sponsored by WNBC, WNJU, and Politico)	Jun 3–9, 2021	876 (LV)	± 3.8%	BA	24%	3%	17%	3%	3%	7%	15%	13%	2% Chang: 1% Prince: 1% Foldenauer: <1% Taylor: <1% Wright: <1%	13%
Marist College	Jun 3–9, 2021	876 (LV)	± 3.8%	1	28%	3%	19%	4%	4%	8%	17%	15%	2% Chang: 1% Prince: 1% Foldenauer: <1% Taylor: <1% Wright: <1%	–
Marist College	Jun 3–9, 2021	876 (LV)	± 3.8%	2	28%	3%	19%	4%	4%	8%	17%	15%	2% Chang: 1% Prince: 1% Taylor: <1% Wright: <1%	–
Marist College	Jun 3–9, 2021	876 (LV)	± 3.8%	3	28%	3%	19%	4%	4%	8%	17%	15%	2% Chang: 1% Prince: 1% Taylor: <1%	–
Marist College	Jun 3–9, 2021	876 (LV)	± 3.8%	4	28%	3%	19%	4%	4%	8%	17%	15%	2% Chang: 1% Prince: 1%	–
Marist College	Jun 3–9, 2021	876 (LV)	± 3.8%	5	28%	3%	20%	4%	4%	8%	17%	15%	1% Prince: 1%	–
Marist College	Jun 3–9, 2021	876 (LV)	± 3.8%	6	28%	4%	20%	4%	4%	8%	17%	15%	–	–
Marist College	Jun 3–9, 2021	876 (LV)	± 3.8%	7	29%	–	20%	4%	5%	9%	17%	16%	–	–
Marist College	Jun 3–9, 2021	876 (LV)	± 3.8%	8	30%	–	21%	–	5%	9%	18%	17%	–	–
Marist College	Jun 3–9, 2021	876 (LV)	± 3.8%	9	31%	–	22%	–	–	9%	20%	17%	–	–
Marist College	Jun 3–9, 2021	876 (LV)	± 3.8%	10	34%	–	24%	–	–	–	22%	19%	–	–
Marist College	Jun 3–9, 2021	876 (LV)	± 3.8%	11	43%	–	30%	–	–	–	27%	–	–	–
Marist College	Jun 3–9, 2021	876 (LV)	± 3.8%	12	56%	–	44%	–	–	–	–	–	–	–
Emerson College	Jun 7–8, 2021	725 (LV)	± 3.6%	BA	23%	4%	12%	3%	2%	9%	17%	15%	4% Taylor: 2% Chang: 1% Prince: 1% Foldenauer: 0% Wright: 0%	12%
Emerson College	Jun 7–8, 2021	725 (LV)	± 3.6%	2	26%	4%	14%	3%	2%	11%	19%	17%	5% Taylor: 2% Chang: 2% Prince: 1%	–
Emerson College	Jun 7–8, 2021	725 (LV)	± 3.6%	3	26%	5%	14%	4%	2%	11%	19%	17%	4% Taylor: 2% Chang: 2%	–
Emerson College	Jun 7–8, 2021	725 (LV)	± 3.6%	4	26%	5%	14%	4%	3%	11%	19%	18%	2% Taylor: 2%	–
Emerson College	Jun 7–8, 2021	725 (LV)	± 3.6%	5	26%	5%	14%	4%	3%	11%	19%	19%	–	–
Emerson College	Jun 7–8, 2021	725 (LV)	± 3.6%	6	26%	5%	14%	4%	–	11%	21%	19%	–	–
Emerson College	Jun 7–8, 2021	725 (LV)	± 3.6%	7	28%	5%	15%	–	–	11%	21%	20%	–	–
Emerson College	Jun 7–8, 2021	725 (LV)	± 3.6%	8	29%	–	15%	–	–	12%	22%	22%	–	–
Emerson College	Jun 7–8, 2021	725 (LV)	± 3.6%	9	33%	–	19%	–	–	–	26%	23%	–	–
Emerson College	Jun 7–8, 2021	725 (LV)	± 3.6%	10	40%	–	–	–	–	–	33%	27%	–	–
Emerson College	Jun 7–8, 2021	725 (LV)	± 3.6%	11	59%	–	–	–	–	–	41%	–	–	–
Ipsos (Note: This poll was sponsored by Spectrum News NY1)	May 17–31, 2021	906 (LV)	± 4.5%	BA	24%	4%	13%	5%	5%	10%	10%	17%	–	11%
Ipsos	May 17–31, 2021	906 (LV)	± 4.5%	1	27%	5%	15%	5%	6%	11%	12%	19%	–	
Ipsos	May 17–31, 2021	906 (LV)	± 4.5%	2	28%	–	16%	5%	6%	12%	12%	20%	–	
Ipsos	May 17–31, 2021	906 (LV)	± 4.5%	3	30%	–	17%	–	7%	13%	13%	20%	–	
Ipsos	May 17–31, 2021	906 (LV)	± 4.5%	4	32%	–	18%	–	–	14%	16%	21%	–	
Ipsos	May 17–31, 2021	906 (LV)	± 4.5%	5	37%	–	22%	–	–	–	19%	23%	–	
Ipsos	May 17–31, 2021	906 (LV)	± 4.5%	6	42%	–	29%	–	–	–	–	28%	–	
Ipsos	May 17–31, 2021	906 (LV)	± 4.5%	7	60%	–	40%	–	–	–	–	–	–	
Ipsos	May 17–31, 2021	906 (LV)	± 4.5%	7 (Note: Hypothetical scenario with Garcia eliminated instead of Yang after round 6)	58%	–	–	–	–	–	–	42%	–	
Emerson College	May 23–24, 2021	570 (LV)	± 4.1%	BA	20%	5%	21%	2%	7%	10%	9%	16%	2% Foldenauer: 1% Prince: 1% Chang: 0% Taylor: 0% Wright: 0%	9%
Emerson College	May 23–24, 2021	570 (LV)	± 4.1%	2	22%	6%	23%	2%	8%	10%	9%	17%	2% Foldenauer: 1% Prince: 1% Chang: 0%	–
Emerson College	May 23–24, 2021	570 (LV)	± 4.1%	3	22%	6%	23%	2%	8%	10%	9%	17%	2% Foldenauer: 1% Prince: 1%	–
Emerson College	May 23–24, 2021	570 (LV)	± 4.1%	4	22%	6%	23%	2%	8%	11%	10%	17%	1% Foldenauer: 1%	–
Emerson College	May 23–24, 2021	570 (LV)	± 4.1%	5	22%	6%	23%	2%	8%	12%	10%	17%	–	–
Emerson College	May 23–24, 2021	570 (LV)	± 4.1%	6	24%	6%	24%	–	8%	12%	10%	17%	–	–
Emerson College	May 23–24, 2021	570 (LV)	± 4.1%	7	25%	–	26%	–	8%	12%	10%	19%	–	–
Emerson College	May 23–24, 2021	570 (LV)	± 4.1%	8	25%	–	27%	–	–	13%	15%	19%	–	–
Emerson College	May 23–24, 2021	570 (LV)	± 4.1%	9	28%	–	31%	–	–	–	20%	22%	–	–
Emerson College	May 23–24, 2021	570 (LV)	± 4.1%	10	34%	–	40%	–	–	–	–	26%	–	–
Emerson College	May 23–24, 2021	570 (LV)	± 4.1%	11	45%	–	55%	–	–	–	–	–	–	–
Slingshot Strategies (D) (Note: This poll was sponsored by Yang's campaign committee)	May 17–20, 2021	749 (LV)	± 3.6%	BA	16%	4%	10%	5%	7%	13%	8%	19%	7% Foldenauer: 4% Chang: 2% Prince: 1% Taylor: 0% Wright: 0% "Other": 0%	13%
Slingshot Strategies (D)	May 17–20, 2021	749 (LV)	± 3.6%	1	18%	5%	11%	5%	8%	15%	9%	21%	8% Foldenauer: 5% Chang: 2% Prince: 1% Taylor: 0% Wright: 0% "Other": 0%	–
Slingshot Strategies (D)	May 17–20, 2021	749 (LV)	± 3.6%	2	18%	5%	11%	5%	8%	15%	9%	21%	8% Foldenauer: 5% Chang: 2% Prince: 1% Taylor: 0%	–
Slingshot Strategies (D)	May 17–20, 2021	749 (LV)	± 3.6%	3	18%	5%	11%	5%	8%	15%	9%	21%	8% Foldenauer: 5% Chang: 2% Prince: 1%	–
Slingshot Strategies (D)	May 17–20, 2021	749 (LV)	± 3.6%	4	18%	5%	11%	5%	8%	15%	9%	21%	7% Foldenauer: 5% Chang: 2%	–
Slingshot Strategies (D)	May 17–20, 2021	749 (LV)	± 3.6%	5	19%	5%	12%	6%	8%	15%	10%	22%	5% Foldenauer: 5%	–
Slingshot Strategies (D)	May 17–20, 2021	749 (LV)	± 3.6%	6	19%	5%	12%	7%	9%	16%	11%	22%	–	–
Slingshot Strategies (D)	May 17–20, 2021	749 (LV)	± 3.6%	7	20%	–	13%	8%	9%	16%	11%	23%	–	–
Slingshot Strategies (D)	May 17–20, 2021	749 (LV)	± 3.6%	8	21%	–	14%	–	9%	19%	13%	24%	–	–
Slingshot Strategies (D)	May 17–20, 2021	749 (LV)	± 3.6%	9	22%	–	14%	–	–	22%	17%	25%	–	–
Slingshot Strategies (D)	May 17–20, 2021	749 (LV)	± 3.6%	10	25%	–	–	–	–	25%	21%	29%	–	–
Slingshot Strategies (D)	May 17–20, 2021	749 (LV)	± 3.6%	11	33%	–	–	–	–	31%	–	36%	–	–
Slingshot Strategies (D)	May 17–20, 2021	749 (LV)	± 3.6%	12	49%	–	–	–	–	–	–	51%	–	–
Public Opinion Strategies (R)	May 14–17, 2021	500 (LV)	± 4.4%	BA	18%	4%	11%	6%	6%	8%	10%	19%	2% Prince: 1% Wright: 1% Chang: 0% Foldenauer: 0% Taylor: 0%	14%
Public Opinion Strategies (R)	May 14–17, 2021	500 (LV)	± 4.4%	1	21%	5%	13%	7%	7%	10%	11%	22%	2% Prince: 1% Wright: 1% Chang: 0% Taylor: 0%	–
Public Opinion Strategies (R)	May 14–17, 2021	500 (LV)	± 4.4%	2	21%	5%	13%	7%	7%	10%	11%	22%	2% Prince: 1% Wright: 1% Taylor: 0%	–
Public Opinion Strategies (R)	May 14–17, 2021	500 (LV)	± 4.4%	3	21%	5%	13%	7%	7%	10%	11%	23%	2% Prince: 1% Wright: 1%	–
Public Opinion Strategies (R)	May 14–17, 2021	500 (LV)	± 4.4%	4	21%	5%	13%	8%	7%	10%	11%	23%	1% Prince: 1%	–
Public Opinion Strategies (R)	May 14–17, 2021	500 (LV)	± 4.4%	5	21%	5%	13%	8%	7%	10%	12%	23%	–	–
Public Opinion Strategies (R)	May 14–17, 2021	500 (LV)	± 4.4%	6	23%	–	13%	9%	8%	11%	13%	24%	–	–
Public Opinion Strategies (R)	May 14–17, 2021	500 (LV)	± 4.4%	7	24%	–	15%	10%	–	11%	16%	24%	–	–
Public Opinion Strategies (R)	May 14–17, 2021	500 (LV)	± 4.4%	8	27%	–	16%	–	–	12%	18%	26%	–	–
Public Opinion Strategies (R)	May 14–17, 2021	500 (LV)	± 4.4%	9	30%	–	20%	–	–	–	21%	29%	–	–
Public Opinion Strategies (R)	May 14–17, 2021	500 (LV)	± 4.4%	10	36%	–	–	–	–	–	30%	34%	–	–
Public Opinion Strategies (R)	May 14–17, 2021	500 (LV)	± 4.4%	11	52%	–	–	–	–	–	–	48%	–	–
Emerson College	May 13–15, 2021	631 (LV)	± 3.8%	BA	18%	5%	8%	4%	6%	15%	4%	15%	3% Chang: 2% Taylor: 1% Foldenauer: 0% Prince: 0% Wright: 0%	23%
Emerson College	May 13–15, 2021	631 (LV)	± 3.8%	2	23%	7%	10%	5%	7%	20%	5%	20%	3% Chang: 2% Taylor: 1%	–
Emerson College	May 13–15, 2021	631 (LV)	± 3.8%	3	23%	7%	11%	5%	7%	20%	5%	20%	3% Chang: 3%	–
Emerson College	May 13–15, 2021	631 (LV)	± 3.8%	4	23%	7%	11%	5%	7%	20%	5%	22%	–	–
Emerson College	May 13–15, 2021	631 (LV)	± 3.8%	5	24%	7%	13%	6%	8%	20%	–	23%	–	–
Emerson College	May 13–15, 2021	631 (LV)	± 3.8%	6	26%	9%	13%	–	9%	20%	–	23%	–	–
Emerson College	May 13–15, 2021	631 (LV)	± 3.8%	7	27%	9%	18%	–	–	22%	–	24%	–	–
Emerson College	May 13–15, 2021	631 (LV)	± 3.8%	8	29%	–	21%	–	–	24%	–	26%	–	–
Emerson College	May 13–15, 2021	631 (LV)	± 3.8%	9	36%	–	–	–	–	31%	–	33%	–	–
Emerson College	May 13–15, 2021	631 (LV)	± 3.8%	10	53%	–	–	–	–	–	–	47%	–	–
Change Research (D)	May 11–12, 2021	418 (LV)	± 4.8%	BA	21%	6%	11%	6%	5%	8%	6%	18%	2% "Would not vote": 1% Wright: 1% Chang: 0% Prince: 0% Taylor: 0%	18%
Change Research (D)	May 11–12, 2021	418 (LV)	± 4.8%	2	26%	7%	14%	7%	6%	10%	7%	22%	1% Wright: 1% Chang: 0%	–
Change Research (D)	May 11–12, 2021	418 (LV)	± 4.8%	3	26%	7%	14%	8%	6%	10%	7%	22%	1% Wright: 1%	–
Change Research (D)	May 11–12, 2021	418 (LV)	± 4.8%	4	26%	7%	14%	8%	6%	10%	8%	22%	–	–
Change Research (D)	May 11–12, 2021	418 (LV)	± 4.8%	5	26%	7%	16%	8%	–	11%	10%	23%	–	–
Change Research (D)	May 11–12, 2021	418 (LV)	± 4.8%	6	27%	–	17%	9%	–	12%	11%	25%	–	–
Change Research (D)	May 11–12, 2021	418 (LV)	± 4.8%	7	28%	–	18%	–	–	14%	11%	28%	–	–
Change Research (D)	May 11–12, 2021	418 (LV)	± 4.8%	8	31%	–	21%	–	–	17%	–	31%	–	–
Change Research (D)	May 11–12, 2021	418 (LV)	± 4.8%	9	37%	–	26%	–	–	–	–	37%	–	–
Change Research (D)	May 11–12, 2021	418 (LV)	± 4.8%	10	50%	–	–	–	–	–	–	50%	–	–
Change Research (D)	May 6–12, 2021	1,422 (LV)	± 2.6%	BA	19%	7%	7%	7%	5%	9%	7%	16%	2% "Would not vote": 1% Wright: 1% Chang: 0% Prince: 0% Taylor: 0%	20%
Change Research (D)	May 6–12, 2021	1,422 (LV)	± 2.6%	2	24%	9%	8%	9%	6%	11%	9%	21%	1% Wright: 1% Prince: 0%	–
Change Research (D)	May 6–12, 2021	1,422 (LV)	± 2.6%	3	24%	9%	9%	9%	7%	11%	9%	21%	1% Wright: 1%	–
Change Research (D)	May 6–12, 2021	1,422 (LV)	± 2.6%	4	25%	9%	9%	9%	7%	11%	10%	21%	–	–
Change Research (D)	May 6–12, 2021	1,422 (LV)	± 2.6%	5	26%	9%	9%	9%	–	12%	13%	22%	–	–
Change Research (D)	May 6–12, 2021	1,422 (LV)	± 2.6%	6	27%	–	11%	11%	–	14%	13%	24%	–	–
Change Research (D)	May 6–12, 2021	1,422 (LV)	± 2.6%	7	30%	–	12%	–	–	15%	15%	28%	–	–
Change Research (D)	May 6–12, 2021	1,422 (LV)	± 2.6%	8	34%	–	–	–	–	18%	18%	31%	–	–
Change Research (D)	May 6–12, 2021	1,422 (LV)	± 2.6%	9	41%	–	–	–	–	23%	–	37%	–	–
Change Research (D)	May 6–12, 2021	1,422 (LV)	± 2.6%	10	53%	–	–	–	–	–	–	47%	–	–
Schoen Cooperman Research (D) (Note: This poll was sponsored by New Yorkers for a Better Future, Inc.)	May 4–9, 2021	1,003 (LV)	± 3.1%	BA	17%	6%	8%	6%	4%	10%	10%	21%	1%	17%
Schoen Cooperman Research (D)	May 4–9, 2021	1,003 (LV)	± 3.1%	1	21%	7%	9%	8%	5%	12%	12%	26%	–	
Schoen Cooperman Research (D)	May 4–9, 2021	1,003 (LV)	± 3.1%	2	22%	7%	10%	9%	–	13%	13%	26%	–	
Schoen Cooperman Research (D)	May 4–9, 2021	1,003 (LV)	± 3.1%	3	23%	–	10%	10%	–	15%	14%	28%	–	
Schoen Cooperman Research (D)	May 4–9, 2021	1,003 (LV)	± 3.1%	4	25%	–	12%	–	–	17%	16%	30%	–	
Schoen Cooperman Research (D)	May 4–9, 2021	1,003 (LV)	± 3.1%	5	28%	–	–	–	–	19%	20%	33%	–	
Schoen Cooperman Research (D)	May 4–9, 2021	1,003 (LV)	± 3.1%	6	36%	–	–	–	–	–	24%	40%	–	
Schoen Cooperman Research (D)	May 4–9, 2021	1,003 (LV)	± 3.1%	7	47%	–	–	–	–	–	–	53%	–	
Mercury Public Affairs (D) (Note: This poll was sponsored by Future Forward NYC, Inc., which supports Yang for mayor)	Apr 26 – May 1, 2021	600 (LV)	± 4.0%	BA	14%	6%	4%	6%	3%	14%	6%	21%	–	26%
Mercury Public Affairs (D)	Apr 26 – May 1, 2021	600 (LV)	± 4.0%	1	15%	8%	5%	6%	5%	18%	8%	35%	–	
Mercury Public Affairs (D)	Apr 26 – May 1, 2021	600 (LV)	± 4.0%	2	15%	8%	5%	6%	–	19%	11%	36%	–	
Mercury Public Affairs (D)	Apr 26 – May 1, 2021	600 (LV)	± 4.0%	3	15%	8%	–	7%	–	20%	12%	36%	–	
Mercury Public Affairs (D)	Apr 26 – May 1, 2021	600 (LV)	± 4.0%	4	17%	9%	–	–	–	21%	13%	40%	–	
Mercury Public Affairs (D)	Apr 26 – May 1, 2021	600 (LV)	± 4.0%	5	19%	–	–	–	–	24%	14%	43%	–	
Mercury Public Affairs (D)	Apr 26 – May 1, 2021	600 (LV)	± 4.0%	6	23%	–	–	–	–	28%	–	48%	–	
Mercury Public Affairs (D)	Apr 26 – May 1, 2021	600 (LV)	± 4.0%	7	–	–	–	–	–	39%	–	61%	–	
Benenson Strategy Group (D) (Note: This poll was sponsored by StudentsFirstNY, a pro-charter schools group, which released this poll just before its executive director formed a pro-Adams PAC)	Apr 16–21, 2021	1,558 (LV)	± 2.5%	BA	17%	7%	5%	8%	7%	11%	8%	22%	1%	14%
Benenson Strategy Group (D)	Apr 16–21, 2021	1,558 (LV)	± 2.5%	1	20%	8%	6%	9%	8%	12%	10%	26%	–	
Benenson Strategy Group (D)	Apr 16–21, 2021	1,558 (LV)	± 2.5%	2	21%	8%	–	10%	9%	14%	11%	27%	–	
Benenson Strategy Group (D)	Apr 16–21, 2021	1,558 (LV)	± 2.5%	3	22%	–	–	11%	10%	16%	12%	30%	–	
Benenson Strategy Group (D)	Apr 16–21, 2021	1,558 (LV)	± 2.5%	4	23%	–	–	12%	–	18%	15%	32%	–	
Benenson Strategy Group (D)	Apr 16–21, 2021	1,558 (LV)	± 2.5%	5	27%	–	–	–	–	20%	18%	36%	–	
Benenson Strategy Group (D)	Apr 16–21, 2021	1,558 (LV)	± 2.5%	6	31%	–	–	–	–	26%	–	43%	–	
Benenson Strategy Group (D)	Apr 16–21, 2021	1,558 (LV)	± 2.5%	7	44%	–	–	–	–	–	–	56%	–	
Ipsos	Apr 1–15, 2021	1,000 (LV)	± 4.7%	BA	13%	5%	5%	6%	5%	14%	8%	23%	–	21%
Ipsos	Apr 1–15, 2021	1,000 (LV)	± 4.7%	1	17%	6%	6%	7%	7%	17%	10%	29%	–	
Ipsos	Apr 1–15, 2021	1,000 (LV)	± 4.7%	2	18%	7%	–	7%	8%	19%	11%	30%	–	
Ipsos	Apr 1–15, 2021	1,000 (LV)	± 4.7%	3	18%	–	–	9%	8%	21%	12%	32%	–	
Ipsos	Apr 1–15, 2021	1,000 (LV)	± 4.7%	4	20%	–	–	10%	–	22%	15%	34%	–	
Ipsos	Apr 1–15, 2021	1,000 (LV)	± 4.7%	5	23%	–	–	–	–	25%	16%	36%	–	
Ipsos	Apr 1–15, 2021	1,000 (LV)	± 4.7%	6	27%	–	–	–	–	30%	–	43%	–	
Ipsos	Apr 1–15, 2021	1,000 (LV)	± 4.7%	7	–	–	–	–	–	43%	–	57%	–	
Data for Progress (D)	Mar 21 – Apr 5, 2021	1,007 (LV)	± 3.0%	BA	13%	7%	4%	6%	3%	11%	10%	26%	5% "A different candidate": 4% Menchaca: 1%	14%
Data for Progress (D)	Mar 21 – Apr 5, 2021	1,007 (LV)	± 3.0%	8	41%	–	–	–	–	–	–	59%	–	
Data for Progress (D)	Mar 21 – Apr 5, 2021	1,007 (LV)	± 3.0%	8 (Note: Hypothetical scenario with all candidates eliminated but Donovan and Yang)	–	27%	–	–	–	–	–	73%	–	
Data for Progress (D)	Mar 21 – Apr 5, 2021	1,007 (LV)	± 3.0%	8 (Note: Hypothetical scenario with all candidates eliminated but Stringer and Yang)	–	–	–	–	–	39%	–	61%	–	
Data for Progress (D)	Mar 21 – Apr 5, 2021	1,007 (LV)	± 3.0%	8 (Note: Hypothetical scenario with all candidates eliminated but Wiley and Yang)	–	–	–	–	–	–	32%	68%	–	
Slingshot Strategies (D)	Mar 12–18, 2021	1,000 (LV)	± 3.1%	BA	15%	4%	6%	5%	3%	12%	7%	25%	3% Menchaca: 2% "Other": 1%	20%
Slingshot Strategies (D)	Mar 12–18, 2021	1,000 (LV)	± 3.1%	1	18%	5%	8%	6%	3%	15%	9%	31%	4% Menchaca: 3% "Other": 1%	–
Slingshot Strategies (D)	Mar 12–18, 2021	1,000 (LV)	± 3.1%	2	18%	5%	8%	6%	3%	15%	9%	31%	3% Menchaca: 3%	–
Slingshot Strategies (D)	Mar 12–18, 2021	1,000 (LV)	± 3.1%	3	18%	6%	9%	6%	4%	16%	10%	32%	–	–
Slingshot Strategies (D)	Mar 12–18, 2021	1,000 (LV)	± 3.1%	4	19%	6%	10%	6%	–	16%	11%	32%	–	–
Slingshot Strategies (D)	Mar 12–18, 2021	1,000 (LV)	± 3.1%	5	20%	–	10%	7%	–	18%	11%	33%	–	–
Slingshot Strategies (D)	Mar 12–18, 2021	1,000 (LV)	± 3.1%	6	22%	–	11%	–	–	19%	12%	35%	–	–
Slingshot Strategies (D)	Mar 12–18, 2021	1,000 (LV)	± 3.1%	7	24%	–	–	–	–	22%	15%	39%	–	–
Slingshot Strategies (D)	Mar 12–18, 2021	1,000 (LV)	± 3.1%	8	28%	–	–	–	–	26%	–	46%	–	–
Slingshot Strategies (D)	Mar 12–18, 2021	1,000 (LV)	± 3.1%	9	41%	–	–	–	–	–	–	59%	–	–
Slingshot Strategies (D)	Jan 15–19, 2021	1,000 (LV)	± 3.1%	BA	17%	1%	1%	1%	1%	12%	8%	25%	1% "Other": 1% Iscol: <1% Menchaca: <1% Sutton: <1%	32%
Slingshot Strategies (D)	Jan 15–19, 2021	1,000 (LV)	± 3.1%	1	26%	1%	2%	2%	2%	18%	11%	37%	2% Sutton: 1% "Other": 1% Iscol: <1% Menchaca: <1%	–
Slingshot Strategies (D)	Jan 15–19, 2021	1,000 (LV)	± 3.1%	2	26%	1%	2%	2%	2%	19%	11%	37%	1% Sutton: 1% Iscol: <1% Menchaca: <1%	–
Slingshot Strategies (D)	Jan 15–19, 2021	1,000 (LV)	± 3.1%	3	26%	1%	2%	2%	2%	19%	11%	37%	1% Sutton: 1% Menchaca: <1%	–
Slingshot Strategies (D)	Jan 15–19, 2021	1,000 (LV)	± 3.1%	4	26%	1%	2%	2%	2%	19%	11%	37%	1% Sutton: 1%	–
Slingshot Strategies (D)	Jan 15–19, 2021	1,000 (LV)	± 3.1%	5	26%	1%	2%	2%	2%	19%	12%	37%	–	–
Slingshot Strategies (D)	Jan 15–19, 2021	1,000 (LV)	± 3.1%	6	26%	–	2%	2%	2%	19%	12%	37%	–	–
Slingshot Strategies (D)	Jan 15–19, 2021	1,000 (LV)	± 3.1%	7	26%	–	2%	–	2%	20%	12%	38%	–	–
Slingshot Strategies (D)	Jan 15–19, 2021	1,000 (LV)	± 3.1%	8	27%	–	3%	–	–	20%	12%	39%	–	–
Slingshot Strategies (D)	Jan 15–19, 2021	1,000 (LV)	± 3.1%	9	27%	–	–	–	–	20%	13%	39%	–	–
Slingshot Strategies (D)	Jan 15–19, 2021	1,000 (LV)	± 3.1%	10	30%	–	–	–	–	24%	–	46%	–	–
Slingshot Strategies (D)	Jan 15–19, 2021	1,000 (LV)	± 3.1%	11	39%	–	–	–	–	–	–	61%	–	–
Slingshot Strategies (D)	Nov 30 – Dec 6, 2020	1,000 (LV)	± 3.1%	BA	11%	2%	3%	2%	2%	11%	7%	17%	20% Quinn: 7% Rose: 5% Menchaca: 3% Iscol: 2% Sutton: 2% "Other": 1%	25%
Slingshot Strategies (D)	Nov 30 – Dec 6, 2020	1,000 (LV)	± 3.1%	1	15%	3%	4%	3%	2%	15%	9%	23%	25% Quinn: 10% Rose: 6% Menchaca: 3% Iscol: 2% Sutton: 2% "Other": 2%	–
Slingshot Strategies (D)	Nov 30 – Dec 6, 2020	1,000 (LV)	± 3.1%	2	15%	3%	5%	3%	2%	15%	9%	23%	26% Quinn: 10% Rose: 7% Menchaca: 4% Iscol: 3% Sutton: 2%	–
Slingshot Strategies (D)	Nov 30 – Dec 6, 2020	1,000 (LV)	± 3.1%	3	16%	3%	5%	3%	3%	15%	9%	23%	24% Quinn: 10% Rose: 7% Menchaca: 4% Iscol: 3%	–
Slingshot Strategies (D)	Nov 30 – Dec 6, 2020	1,000 (LV)	± 3.1%	4	16%	3%	5%	3%	–	15%	9%	24%	24% Quinn: 10% Rose: 7% Menchaca: 4% Iscol: 3%	–
Slingshot Strategies (D)	Nov 30 – Dec 6, 2020	1,000 (LV)	± 3.1%	5	16%	3%	6%	3%	–	15%	9%	24%	22% Quinn: 11% Rose: 7% Menchaca: 4%	–
Slingshot Strategies (D)	Nov 30 – Dec 6, 2020	1,000 (LV)	± 3.1%	6	16%	–	6%	4%	–	16%	10%	24%	24% Quinn: 11% Rose: 8% Menchaca: 5%	–
Slingshot Strategies (D)	Nov 30 – Dec 6, 2020	1,000 (LV)	± 3.1%	7	17%	–	6%	–	–	17%	10%	25%	25% Quinn: 11% Rose: 9% Menchaca: 5%	–
Slingshot Strategies (D)	Nov 30 – Dec 6, 2020	1,000 (LV)	± 3.1%	8	18%	–	7%	–	–	18%	11%	26%	21% Quinn: 12% Rose: 9%	–
Slingshot Strategies (D)	Nov 30 – Dec 6, 2020	1,000 (LV)	± 3.1%	9	19%	–	–	–	–	18%	12%	27%	23% Quinn: 13% Rose: 10%	–
Slingshot Strategies (D)	Nov 30 – Dec 6, 2020	1,000 (LV)	± 3.1%	10	21%	–	–	–	–	21%	14%	29%	14% Quinn: 14%	–
Slingshot Strategies (D)	Nov 30 – Dec 6, 2020	1,000 (LV)	± 3.1%	11	26%	–	–	–	–	24%	–	33%	17% Quinn: 17%	–
Slingshot Strategies (D)	Nov 30 – Dec 6, 2020	1,000 (LV)	± 3.1%	12	30%	–	–	–	–	29%	–	41%	–	–
Slingshot Strategies (D)	Nov 30 – Dec 6, 2020	1,000 (LV)	± 3.1%	13	42%	–	–	–	–	–	–	58%	–	–

==== First-past-the-post polls ====
Poll source	Date(s) administered	Sample size	Margin of error	Eric Adams	Shaun Donovan	Kathryn Garcia	Raymond McGuire	Dianne Morales	Scott Stringer	Maya Wiley	Andrew Yang	Others	Undecided
Data for Progress (D)	Jun 18–20, 2021	1,354 (LV)	± 3.0%	26%	3%	18%	3%	2%	5%	21%	12%	2%	6%
Citizen Data (Note: First-choice results from a ranked-choice poll)	Jun 14–17, 2021	800 (LV)	± 3.5%	32%	5%	18%	3%	6%	6%	18%	11%	2%	–
Ipsos	Jun 10–17, 2021	702 (LV)	± 5.7%	27%	4%	12%	5%	2%	9%	12%	20%	<1%	7%
Emerson College	Jun 15–16, 2021	664 (LV)	± 3.7%	23%	2%	17%	3%	2%	9%	18%	14%	1% Chang: 1% Foldenauer: 0% Prince: 0% Taylor: 0% Wright: 0%	10%
McLaughlin & Associates (R) (Note: This poll was sponsored by the New York Post, whose editorial board endorsed Adams)	Jun 10–15, 2021	1,000 (LV)	± 3.1%	21%	3%	16%	2%	3%	7%	17%	10%	1%	21%
Change Research (D)	Jun 11–14, 2021	822 (LV)	± 3.4%	23%	4%	19%	3%	1%	8%	19%	12%	0% Chang: 0% Foldenauer: 0% Prince: 0% Taylor: 0% Wright: 0%	10%
Schoen Cooperman Research (D)	Jun 10–13, 2021	1,000 (LV)	± 3.1%	22%	6%	14%	4%	4%	9%	16%	18%	0%	7%
Public Opinion Strategies (R)	Jun 9–13, 2021	500 (LV)	± 4.4%	21%	4%	20%	2%	2%	8%	18%	13%	2% Chang: 1% Taylor: 1% Prince: <1% Foldenauer: 0% Wright: 0%	9%
Data for Progress (D)	Jun 7–13, 2021	998 (LV)	± 3.0%	26%	2%	14%	4%	3%	8%	20%	16%	3%	4%
Honan Strategy Group (D)	May 26 – Jun 10, 2021	950 (LV)	± 3.2%	31%	9%	15%	1%	1%	6%	7%	21%	–	9%
Marist College	Jun 3–9, 2021	876 (LV)	± 3.8%	24%	3%	17%	3%	3%	7%	15%	13%	2% Chang: 1% Prince: 1% Foldenauer: <1% Taylor: <1% Wright: <1%	13%
Emerson College	Jun 7–8, 2021	725 (LV)	± 3.6%	23%	4%	12%	3%	2%	9%	17%	15%	4% Taylor: 2% Chang: 1% Prince: 1% Foldenauer: 0% Wright: 0%	12%
Slingshot Strategies (D)	Jun 1–6, 2021	1,191 (LV)	± 2.8%	17%	3%	14%	4%	7%	12%	8%	16%	7% Foldenauer: 4% Chang: 1% Prince: 1% Wright: 1% Taylor: 0% "Other": 0%	12%
Media Predict (Note: This poll was sponsored by Univision 41 Nueva York (WXTV))	May 27 – Jun 6, 2021	501 (RV)	± 6.0%	20%	4%	15%	1%	5%	8%	7%	19%	–	20%
Ipsos	May 17–31, 2021	906 (LV)	± 4.5%	22%	3%	15%	4%	5%	10%	9%	16%	<1%	16%
Emerson College	May 23–24, 2021	570 (LV)	± 4.1%	20%	5%	21%	2%	7%	10%	9%	16%	2% Foldenauer: 1% Prince: 1% Chang: 0% Taylor: 0% Wright: 0%	9%
Slingshot Strategies (D)	May 17–20, 2021	749 (LV)	± 3.6%	16%	4%	10%	5%	7%	13%	8%	19%	7% Foldenauer: 4% Chang: 2% Prince: 1% Taylor: 0% Wright: 0% "Other": 0%	13%
Core Decision Analytics (Note: This poll was conducted by Core Decision Analytics, which is working with Garcia's campaign, and was sponsored by the NYC-based lobbying group Fontas Advisors, which is not working on behalf of any candidates)	May 15–19, 2021	800 (LV)	± 3.5%	18%	4%	11%	4%	9%	7%	9%	13%	1%	26%
Public Opinion Strategies (R)	May 14–17, 2021	500 (LV)	± 4.4%	18%	4%	11%	6%	6%	8%	10%	19%	2% Prince: 1% Wright: 1% Chang: 0% Foldenauer: 0% Taylor: 0%	14%
Emerson College	May 13–15, 2021	631 (LV)	± 3.8%	18%	5%	8%	4%	6%	15%	4%	15%	3% Chang: 2% Taylor: 1% Foldenauer: 0% Prince: 0% Wright: 0%	23%
Change Research (D)	May 11–12, 2021	418 (LV)	± 4.8%	21%	6%	11%	6%	5%	8%	6%	18%	2% "Would not vote": 1% Wright: 1% Chang: 0% Prince: 0% Taylor: 0%	18%
Change Research (D)	May 6–12, 2021	1,422 (LV)	± 2.6%	19%	7%	7%	7%	5%	9%	7%	16%	2% "Would not vote": 1% Wright: 1% Chang: 0% Prince: 0% Taylor: 0%	20%
Schoen Cooperman Research (D)	May 4–9, 2021	1,003 (LV)	± 3.1%	17%	6%	8%	6%	4%	10%	10%	21%	1%	17%
Slingshot Strategies (D)	Apr 20–27 and May 3–6, 2021	1,393 (LV)	± 2.6%	11%	6%	5%	10%	6%	15%	7%	21%	6% Foldenauer: 3% Chang: 1% Wright: 1% "Other": 1% Prince: 0%	13%
Slingshot Strategies (D)	Apr 20–27 and May 3–6, 2021	275 (LV)	± 5.9%	12%	10%	5%	9%	4%	– (Note: Hypothetical scenario excluding Stringer)	8%	27%	9% "Other": 4% Foldenauer: 3% Chang: 1% Prince: 1% Wright: 0%	15%
Honan Strategy Group (D) (Note: This poll was sponsored by Hotel Workers for Stronger Communities, which supports Adams for mayor)	Apr 24 – May 2, 2021	1,100 (LV)	± 3.0%	22%	0%	1%	2%	12%	13%	3%	20%	1%	25%
Mercury Public Affairs (D)	Apr 26 – May 1, 2021	600 (LV)	± 4.0%	14%	6%	4%	6%	3%	14%	6%	21%	–	26%
GQR Research (D) (Note: This poll was sponsored by Corey Johnson's comptroller campaign committee)	Apr 27–29, 2021	500 (LV)	± 4.4%	21%	8%	6%	6%	6%	15%	7%	18%	1%	11%
Slingshot Strategies (D)	Apr 20–27, 2021	824 (LV)	± 3.4%	11%	6%	3%	9%	5%	16%	6%	24%	5% Foldenauer: 3% Chang: 1% "Other": 1% Prince: 0% Wright: 0%	14%
Benenson Strategy Group (D)	Apr 16–21, 2021	1,558 (LV)	± 2.5%	17%	7%	5%	8%	7%	11%	8%	22%	1%	14%
Ipsos	Apr 1–15, 2021	1,000 (LV)	± 4.7%	13%	6%	4%	6%	5%	11%	7%	22%	<1%	26%
Data for Progress (D)	Mar 21 – Apr 5, 2021	1,007 (LV)	± 3.0%	13%	7%	4%	6%	3%	11%	10%	26%	5% "A different candidate": 4% Menchaca: 1%	14%
Core Decision Analytics	Mar 15–18, 2021	800 (LV)	± 3.5%	10%	2%	2%	4%	2%	5%	6%	16%	1%	50%
Slingshot Strategies (D)	Mar 12–18, 2021	1,000 (LV)	± 3.1%	15%	4%	6%	5%	3%	12%	7%	25%	3% Menchaca: 2% "Other": 1%	20%
Emerson College	Mar 4–6, 2021	644 (LV)	± 3.8%	19%	4%	5%	3%	4%	6%	9%	32%	2% Chang: 1% Menchaca: 1% Foldenauer: 0% Kavovit: 0% Sutton: 0% Taylor: 0%	17%
Media Predict	Feb 12–25, 2021	894 (RV)	± 3.3%	11%	2%	4%	2%	3%	9%	6%	27%	2% Menchaca: 2%	34%
Core Decision Analytics	Jan 20–25, 2021	842 (LV)	± 3.4%	17%	8%	2%	2%	2%	13%	8%	28%	1% Iscol: 1%	19%
Slingshot Strategies (D)	Jan 15–19, 2021	1,000 (LV)	± 3.1%	17%	1%	1%	1%	1%	12%	8%	25%	1% "Other": 1% Iscol: <1% Menchaca: <1% Sutton: <1%	32%
Public Policy Polling (D) (Note: This poll was sponsored by Democrats for Education Reform, a pro-charter schools group)	Dec 16–17, 2020	755 (LV)	± 3.6%	16%	–	–	4%	5%	5%	7%	17%	6% Quinn: 6%	40%
Slingshot Strategies (D)	Nov 30 – Dec 6, 2020	1,000 (LV)	± 3.1%	14%	2%	3%	2%	2%	11%	7%	20%	17% Quinn: 7% Rose: 6% Menchaca: 2% Iscol: 1% Sutton: 1% "Other": 0%	20%
Data for Progress (D)	Jan 13–19, 2020	366 (LV)	± 5.1%	9%	–	–	–	2%	5%	–	–	38% Johnson: 10% Díaz Jr.: 8% Liu: 7% Quinn: 6% Brewer: 2% Mark-Viverto: 2% Taylor: 2% Foldenauer: 1% Sutton: 0%	46%

==== Head-to-head polls ====
Poll source	Date(s) administered	Sample size	Margin of error	Eric Adams	Kathryn Garcia	Raymond McGuire	Dianne Morales	Scott Stringer	Maya Wiley	Andrew Yang	Undecided
Slingshot Strategies (D)	Jun 1–6, 2021	1,191 (LV)	± 2.8%	44%	–	–	–	–	–	42%	15%
Slingshot Strategies (D)	Jun 1–6, 2021	1,191 (LV)	± 2.8%	–	41%	–	–	–	–	45%	14%
Slingshot Strategies (D)	Jun 1–6, 2021	1,191 (LV)	± 2.8%	–	–	–	–	36%	–	46%	18%
Slingshot Strategies (D)	Jun 1–6, 2021	1,191 (LV)	± 2.8%	–	–	–	–	–	32%	51%	17%
Slingshot Strategies (D)	May 17–20, 2021	749 (LV)	± 3.6%	37%	–	–	–	–	–	44%	18%
Slingshot Strategies (D)	May 17–20, 2021	749 (LV)	± 3.6%	–	–	–	–	36%	–	44%	21%
Slingshot Strategies (D)	May 17–20, 2021	749 (LV)	± 3.6%	–	–	–	–	–	34%	45%	21%
Honan Strategy Group (D)	Apr 24 – May 2, 2021	1,100 (LV)	± 3.0%	51%	–	12%	–	–	–	–	37%
Honan Strategy Group (D)	Apr 24 – May 2, 2021	1,100 (LV)	± 3.0%	44%	–	–	–	33%	–	–	24%
Honan Strategy Group (D)	Apr 24 – May 2, 2021	1,100 (LV)	± 3.0%	50%	–	–	–	–	19%	–	31%
Honan Strategy Group (D)	Apr 24 – May 2, 2021	1,100 (LV)	± 3.0%	39%	–	–	–	–	–	38%	23%
Honan Strategy Group (D)	Apr 24 – May 2, 2021	1,100 (LV)	± 3.0%	30%	–	–	19%	–	5%	22%	23%
Honan Strategy Group (D)	Apr 24 – May 2, 2021	1,100 (LV)	± 3.0%	31%	–	–	–	20%	8%	26%	16%
Slingshot Strategies (D)	Apr 20–27, 2021	824 (LV)	± 3.4%	31%	–	–	–	–	–	44%	25%
Slingshot Strategies (D)	Apr 20–27, 2021	824 (LV)	± 3.4%	–	–	–	–	33%	–	47%	21%
Slingshot Strategies (D)	Apr 20–27, 2021	824 (LV)	± 3.4%	–	–	–	–	–	25%	51%	24%
Slingshot Strategies (D)	Mar 12–18, 2021	1,000 (LV)	± 3.1%	33%	–	–	–	–	–	47%	20%
Slingshot Strategies (D)	Mar 12–18, 2021	1,000 (LV)	± 3.1%	–	–	–	–	27%	–	52%	21%
Slingshot Strategies (D)	Mar 12–18, 2021	1,000 (LV)	± 3.1%	–	–	–	–	–	20%	54%	26%
Slingshot Strategies (D)	Jan 15–19, 2021	1,000 (LV)	± 3.1%	27%	–	–	–	–	–	48%	25%
Slingshot Strategies (D)	Jan 15–19, 2021	1,000 (LV)	± 3.1%	–	–	–	–	27%	–	49%	24%
Slingshot Strategies (D)	Jan 15–19, 2021	1,000 (LV)	± 3.1%	–	–	–	–	–	20%	50%	30%

Polling key and sponsors

== Results ==
Map of cumulative inactive ballots in each round by precinct

On June 29, the New York City Board of Elections became aware of a discrepancy in the unofficial primary results and subsequently posted in a tweet that both test and election night results were tallied together in an error, adding approximately 135,000 additional votes.

On July 6, after new vote tallies were released, the Associated Press declared Eric Adams to be the winner of the primary. The Guardian stated that Adams had prevailed "after appealing to the political center and promising to strike the right balance between fighting crime and ending racial injustice in policing". An earlier report from The New York Times asserted that Adams had run as a "working-class underdog" and had "hammered away at the message that he was the only candidate who could tackle both crime and police reform". The Associated Press later added that Adams had made "his rejection of left-leaning activists’ calls to defund the police" a "centerpiece of his campaign".

Adams was heavily favored to prevail in the general election.

2021 New York City mayoral Democratic primary election
Candidate	Round 1		Round 2		Round 3		Round 4		Round 5		Round 6		Round 7		Round 8	
Candidate	Votes	%	Votes	%	Votes	%	Votes	%	Votes	%	Votes	%	Votes	%	Votes	%
Eric Adams	289,403	30.7%	289,603	30.8%	290,055	30.8%	291,806	31.2%	295,798	31.7%	317,092	34.6%	354,657	40.5%	Won 404,513	Won 50.4%
Kathryn Garcia	184,463	19.6%	184,571	19.6%	184,669	19.6%	186,731	19.9%	191,876	20.5%	223,634	24.4%	266,932	30.5%	397,316	49.6%
Maya Wiley	201,127	21.4%	201,193	21.4%	201,518	21.4%	206,013	22.0%	209,108	22.4%	239,174	26.1%	254,728	29.1%	Eliminated	
Andrew Yang	115,130	12.2%	115,301	12.2%	115,502	12.3%	118,808	12.6%	121,597	13.0%	135,686	14.8%	Eliminated			
Scott Stringer	51,778	5.5%	51,850	5.5%	51,951	5.5%	53,599	5.7%	56,723	6.1%	Eliminated					
Dianne Morales	26,495	2.8%	26,534	2.8%	26,645	2.8%	30,157	3.2%	30,933	3.3%	Eliminated					
Raymond McGuire	25,242	2.7%	25,272	2.7%	25,418	2.7%	26,361	2.8%	27,934	3.0%	Eliminated					
Shaun Donovan	23,167	2.5%	23,189	2.5%	23,314	2.5%	24,042	2.6%	Eliminated							
Aaron Foldenauer	7,742	0.8%	7,758	0.8%	7,819	0.8%	Eliminated									
Art Chang	7,048	0.7%	7,064	0.8%	7,093	0.8%	Eliminated									
Paperboy Prince	3,964	0.4%	4,007	0.4%	4,060	0.4%	Eliminated									
Joycelyn Taylor	2,662	0.3%	2,683	0.3%	2,780	0.3%	Eliminated									
Isaac Wright Jr.	2,242	0.2%	2,254	0.2%	Eliminated											
Write-ins	1,568	0.2%	Eliminated													
Total votes	942,031	100.0%	941,279	100.0%	940,824	100.0%	936,717	100.0%	933,969	100.0%	915,586	100.0%	876,317	100.0%	801,829	100.0%
Exhausted ballots	—		752	0.08%	1,207	0.13%	5,314	0.56%	8,062	0.86%	26,445	2.81%	65,714	6.98%	140,202	14.88%

2021 New York City Democratic mayoral primary
Candidate	Maximum round	Maximum votes	Share in maximum round	Maximum votes First round votesTransfer votes
Eric Adams	8	404,513	42.9%	
Kathryn Garcia	8	397,316	42.2%	
Maya Wiley	7	254,728	27.0%	
Andrew Yang	6	135,686	14.4%	
Scott Stringer	5	56,723	6.0%	
Exhausted votes		140,202	14.9%	

=== Maps ===
First round

Second round

Third round

Fourth round

Fifth round

Sixth round

Seventh round

Eighth round

Adams

10–20%
20–30%
30–40%
40–50%
50–60%
60–70%
70–80%
80–90%
90–100%

Garcia

10–20%
20–30%
30–40%
40–50%
50–60%
60–70%
70–80%
80–90%
90–100%

Wiley

10–20%
20–30%
30–40%
40–50%
50–60%
60–70%
70–80%
80–90%
90–100%

Yang

10–20%
20–30%
30–40%
40–50%
50–60%
60–70%
70–80%
80–90%
90–100%

Stringer

20–30%
30–40%
60–70%
90–100%

Morales

60–70%
90–100%

McGuire

20–30%
30–40%
40–50%
50–60%
90–100%

Donovan

90–100%

Tie

<30%
30–40%
40–50%
50%

No votes
