= The Chief (New York newspaper) =

Newspaper aimed at civil service workers in New York City

- Type: Weekly newspaper
- Founder: Joseph J. O'Reilly
- Editor: Richard Khavkine
- Founded: 1897; 128 years ago
- Language: English
- City: New York City
- Country: United States
- Circulation: 30,651 (as of 2017)
- Website: thechiefleader.com

The Chief, formerly The Chief-Leader, is a long-established newspaper focused on civil service and local government in New York City. Privately owned, it was established in 1897 by Joseph J. O'Reilly, and was first aimed at city firefighters.

The weekly newspaper is known for in-depth coverage of the unions representing civil servants. Its most popular features include listings of job certifications and articles on job openings in city government. Among the many topics it covers are the unions representing firefighters, police, sanitation workers, teachers, and other public servants. The paper also reports on state and federal workers, in addition to issues related to the September 11 attacks, which affected many first-responders in the city.

Its longtime former editor, Richard Steier, wrote a weekly column called ‘’Razzle Dazzle’’.

The newspaper prides itself on a long tradition of independent reporting. It was owned by the Prial family from 1919 until 2021, when it was sold to Ben August. Both the newspaper and website were recently updated with a more modern format. The Chief also expanded its web presence with an e-edition of each issue, opinion polls and other interactive elements. The newspaper is also active on Facebook and Twitter. It's available via paper or online subscription.
