= Shaun Donovan =

American government official and politician

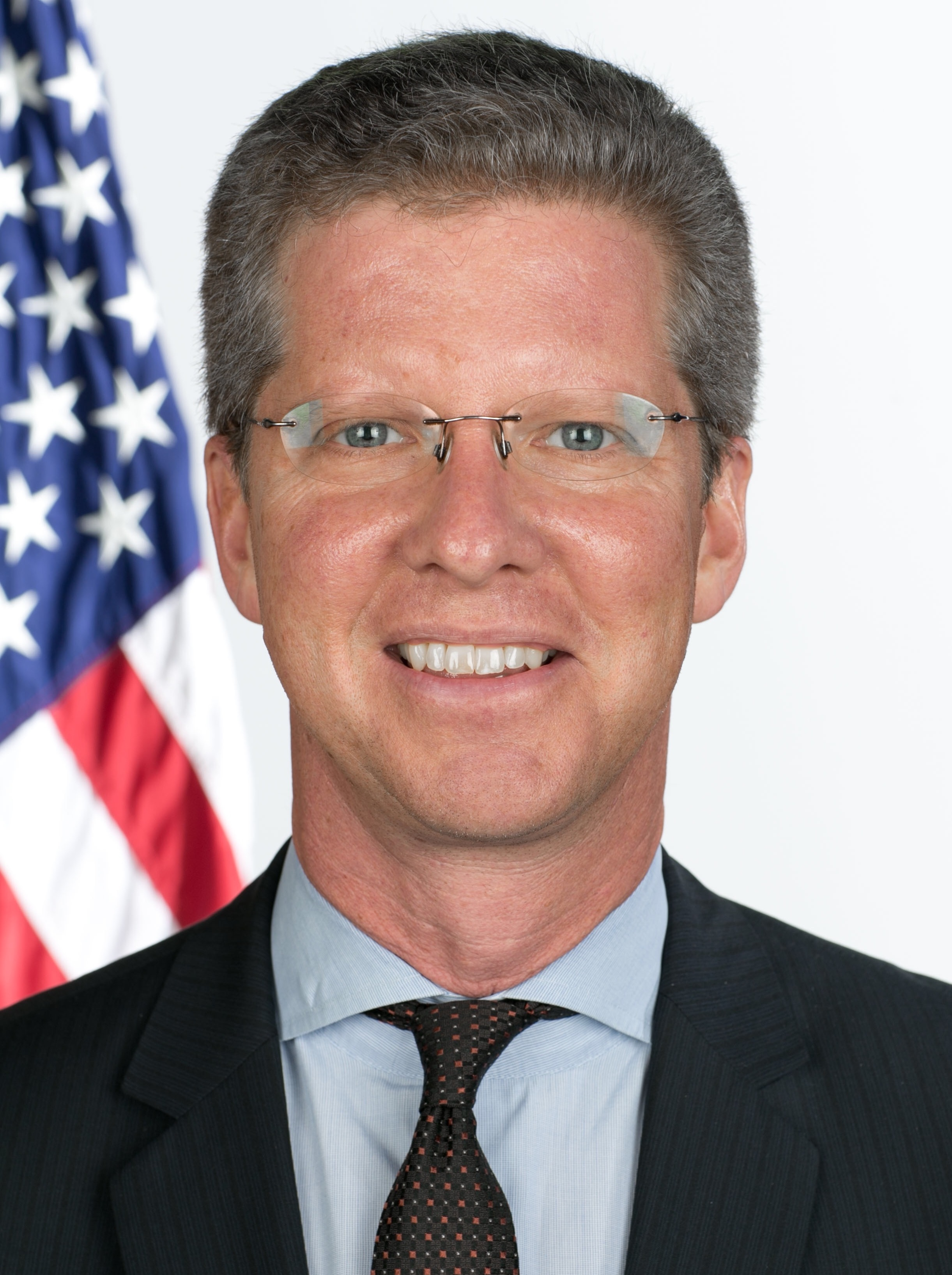
- Official portrait, 2014

40th Director of the Office of Management and Budget
- In office August 5, 2014 – January 20, 2017
- President: Barack Obama
- Deputy: Brian Deese; Robert Gordon (acting)
- Preceded by: Brian Deese (acting)
- Succeeded by: Mick Mulvaney

15th United States Secretary of Housing and Urban Development
- In office January 26, 2009 – July 28, 2014
- President: Barack Obama
- Deputy: Ron Sims; Maurice Jones; Helen Kanovsky (acting)
- Preceded by: Steve Preston
- Succeeded by: Julian Castro

Commissioner of the New York City Department of Housing Preservation and Development
- In office March 1, 2004 – January 20, 2009
- Appointed by: Michael Bloomberg
- Preceded by: Jerilyn Perine
- Succeeded by: Rafael Cestero

Personal details
- Born: Shaun Lawrence Sarda Donovan; January 24, 1966 (age 60) New York City, New York, U.S.
- Party: Democratic
- Spouse: Liza Gilbert
- Education: Harvard University (AB, MPA, MArch)

Shaun Lawrence Sarda Donovan (born January 24, 1966) is an American government official and housing specialist who served as the 15th United States secretary of housing and urban development from 2009 to 2014, and as director of the Office of Management and Budget from 2014 to 2017. Prior to his time in the Obama administration he served as Commissioner of the New York City Department of Housing Preservation and Development from 2004 to 2009 under Mayor Michael Bloomberg.

In February 2020, he filed paperwork to run for Mayor of New York City in the 2021 Democratic primary, which was ultimately won by Eric Adams. In 2023, he was named President and CEO of Enterprise Community Partners, a housing non-profit.

== Early life and education ==
Born in New York, to parents Michael and Martha, Donovan grew up on the Upper East Side and attended the Dalton School in Manhattan. He has three siblings. He holds three degrees from Harvard University: an A.B. in engineering sciences from Harvard College in 1987, a Master of Public Administration degree from the John F. Kennedy School of Government in 1995, and a Master of Architecture degree from the Graduate School of Design in 1995.

Shaun's father, Michael Donovan, is the founder and chairman of the board of directors of advertising software company Mediaocean. He was born in Panama of mixed Catholic, Protestant, and Jewish parentage. Michael Donovan's father was Irish and his mother was Jewish.

== Early career ==
From 1995 to 1998, he worked at the Community Preservation Corporation, a nonprofit lender and affordable housing developer in New York, as a Special Assistant/Assistant Director of Development. While working there, he helped a group of faith-based organizations implement the renowned Nehemiah project, creating 5,000 housing units and helping to revitalize some of New York City's poorest and most disinvested neighborhoods.

During the Bill Clinton administration, from 1998 to 2001, Donovan was Special Assistant/Deputy Assistant Secretary for Multifamily Housing at the United States Department of Housing and Urban Development (HUD), and was acting Federal Housing Administration (FHA) Commissioner.

Donovan then worked on private sector initiatives to finance affordable housing, and researched and wrote about the preservation of federally assisted housing as a visiting scholar at New York University. As a consultant, Donovan advised the Millennial Housing Commission on strategies for increasing multifamily housing development.

He worked for Prudential Mortgage Capital, from 2002 to 2004, as a managing director of FHA lending and affordable housing investments.

== New York City HPD (2004–2009) ==
Donovan was Commissioner of the New York City Department of Housing Preservation and Development from 2004 to 2009 under Mayor Michael Bloomberg. The agency had a $1 billion budget, and 2,700 employees. He was credited with creating the department's Marketplace Plan to build and preserve over 160,000 affordable homes, which was the largest city-sponsored affordable housing plan in US history.

== Obama cabinet (2009–2017) ==
=== Secretary of HUD (2009–2014) ===
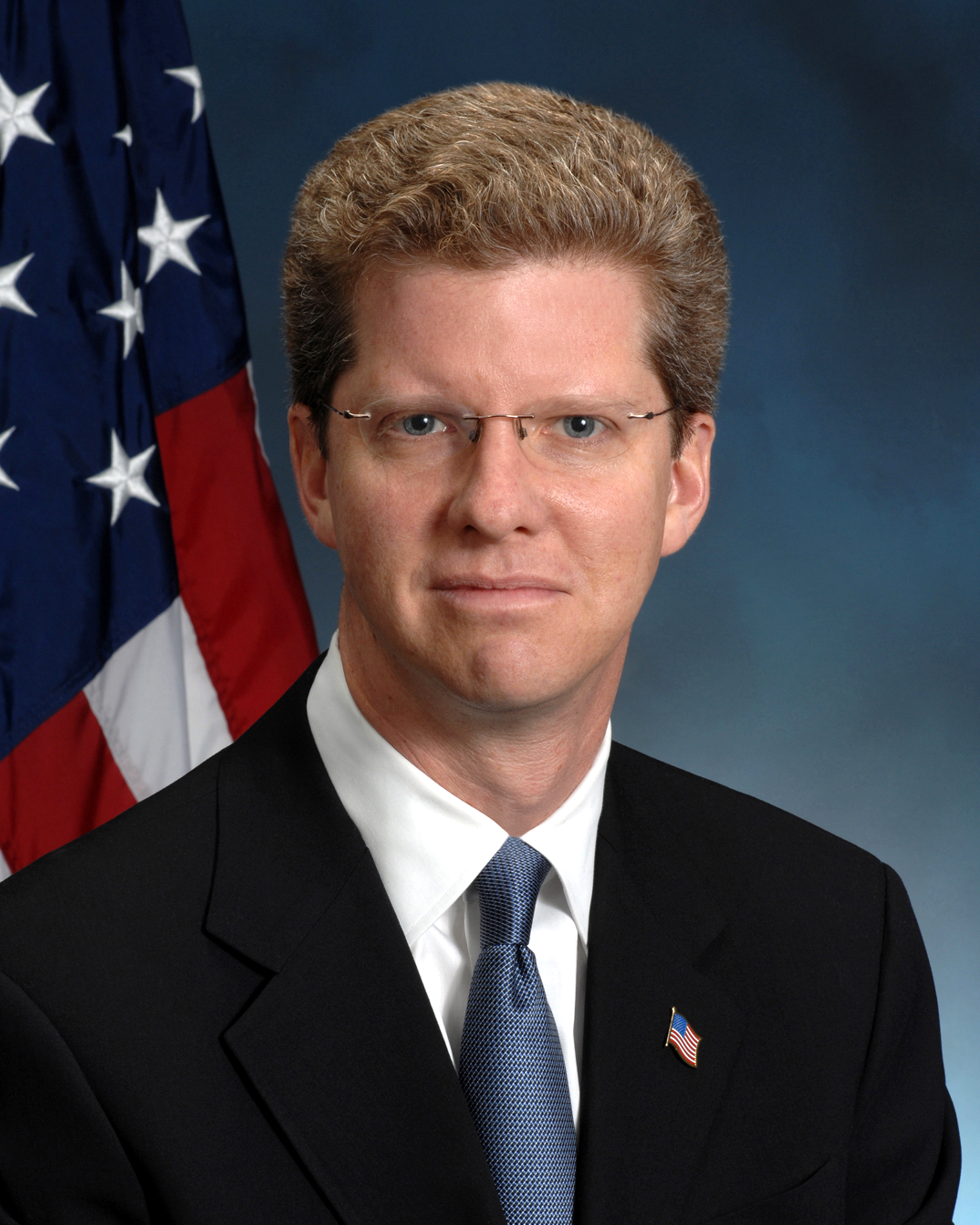
Secretary, U.S. Department of Housing and Urban Development

During the 2008 United States Presidential campaign, Donovan worked for the Obama campaign. On December 13, 2008, President-elect Barack Obama announced that he would appoint Donovan to his cabinet. He was confirmed as US Secretary of Housing and Urban Development by the U.S. Senate through unanimous consent on January 22, 2009, and sworn in on January 26.

While Secretary, Donovan oversaw the allocation of 75% of HUD's share of the American Recovery and Reinvestment Act within one week of the bill's passage.

For President Obama's State of the Union address in 2010, Donovan served as the designated survivor.

On July 28, 2014 he was succeeded as Secretary by Julian Castro, former mayor of San Antonio.

=== Office of Management and Budget (2014–2017) ===
On May 22, 2014, President Obama nominated Donovan to be the next director of the Office of Management and Budget. On July 10, 2014, he was confirmed by the United States Senate by a vote of 75–22. He was ceremonially sworn in by Vice President Joe Biden on August 5, 2014. He served in that role until 2017.

== Post-Obama career ==
In 2017, Harvard University named Donovan Senior Strategist and Advisor to the President on Allston and Campus Development and its expansion in Allston, Massachusetts.

On February 3, 2020, Donovan announced his candidacy for Mayor of New York City in the Democratic primary in 2021. Despite being one of the first announced candidates, Donovan got little support from local organizations and elected officials, and was ranked in the bottom half of pre-primary polls. He committed a notable gaffe when, during an interview with the New York Times, he estimated the median sale price of a home in Brooklyn to be "around $100,000," when it was actually $900,000. Donovan later emailed the New York Times to explain that he thought the question referred to the median assessed value of Brooklyn homes, not the sale price. He was defeated with 2.5% of the vote.

In 2023, he was named President and CEO of Enterprise Community Partners, a national housing nonprofit.

== Personal life ==
Donovan is married to Elizabeth "Liza" Eastman Gilbert, a landscape designer, and they have two sons. They live in Brooklyn, New York City.

Political offices
Preceded by Steve Preston	United States Secretary of Housing and Urban Development; 2009–2014	Succeeded by Julian Castro
Preceded by Brian Deese; Acting	Director of the Office of Management and Budget; 2014–2017	Succeeded by Mick Mulvaney
U.S. order of precedence (ceremonial)
Preceded by Timothy Geithner as Former U.S. Cabinet Member	Order of precedence of the United States as Former U.S. Cabinet Member	Succeeded by Eric Holder as Former U.S. Cabinet Member
