= Dianne Morales =

American non-profit executive

- Born: June 21, 1967 (age 59); New York City, New York, U.S.
- Education: Stony Brook University (BA); Harvard University (MA); Columbia University (MEd)
- Political party: Democratic

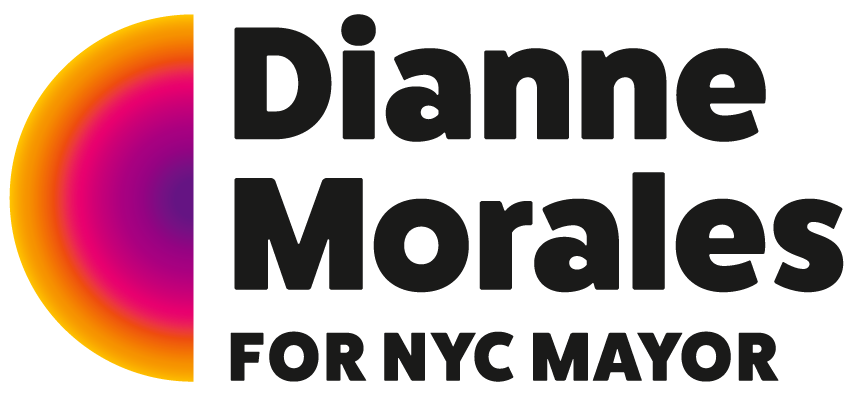
The logo of Dianne Morales's 2021 campaign for Mayor of New York City

Dianne Morales is an American nonprofit executive and politician. She was a candidate in the 2021 New York City Democratic mayoral primary.

== Early life and education ==
Morales is Afro-Latina; her parents are from Puerto Rico. She was born and raised in Bedford-Stuyvesant in Brooklyn, growing up on DeKalb Avenue, and graduated from Stuyvesant High School in Manhattan in New York City.

Morales then went on to attend Stony Brook University and earned a Master of Social Administration from the Harvard Graduate School of Education, and a Master of Education Administration from Columbia University.

== Career ==
While working at the New York City Department of Education, Morales helped open the Office of Youth Development and School-Community Services under Chancellor Joel Klein, and served as its Chief of Operations from 2002 to 2004. From 2004 to 2005, she served as a director of The Teaching Commission, a national task force that focuses on improving teaching quality in American schools. Morales was a founding member of Jumpstart, a national early childhood nonprofit organization. From 2005 to 2009, she served as executive director of The Door, a youth-development organization that serves over 11,000 young people every year.

Since 2010 Morales had been the executive director and CEO of Phipps Neighborhoods in the South Bronx, a Bronx social services organization that fights poverty, until she stepped down to run for mayor in 2019. She serves on the board of the NYC Human Services Council and the Community Schools Advisory Board.

In 2011, she founded the charter school Broome Street Academy.

=== 2021 NYC Mayoral campaign ===
In 2019, Morales announced her candidacy for Mayor of New York City in the 2021 election. In January 2020 she quit her job to campaign full time, in her first political campaign.

Her campaign-announced priorities include reforming the New York City Housing Authority, desegregating city schools, promoting equitable and affordable mass transit, creating green jobs, building affordable housing, a guaranteed minimum income, rent cancellation, cutting the New York Police Department budget, an elected police oversight body, and reforming the police. Morales also is looking to create a "community first responders department" to respond to non-criminal issues such as homelessness and mental health that are currently handled by the police. The New York Daily News in November 2020 described her as one of the most progressive candidates in the race. If elected, she would have become the city's first Afro-Latina mayor and its first female mayor.

In May 2021, senior staffers campaign manager Whitney Hu and senior adviser Ifeoma Ike resigned from the campaign. Four other women attempting to unionize remaining staffers were fired. The departures were preceded by allegations of racial discrimination, sexual harassment, and employee abuse. The New York Times reported on June 9, 2021: "At least four political groups, including the Working Families Party, have rescinded their endorsements, donations slowed to a crawl and her senior adviser has joined a rival campaign."

Morales finished in sixth place in the Democratic primary election held on June 22, 2021.

=== Career since 2021 ===
Morales founded her own consulting firm StillRising since 2021, and worked on other initiatives related to post-Hurricane Maria recovery in Puerto Rico. Since 2025, Morales has been the Executive Director of El Puente based in Brooklyn.

== Personal life ==
Morales is a single mother and lives in Bedford-Stuyvesant with her two children and her parents.
