= Public transport security =

Public safety measures in mass transit

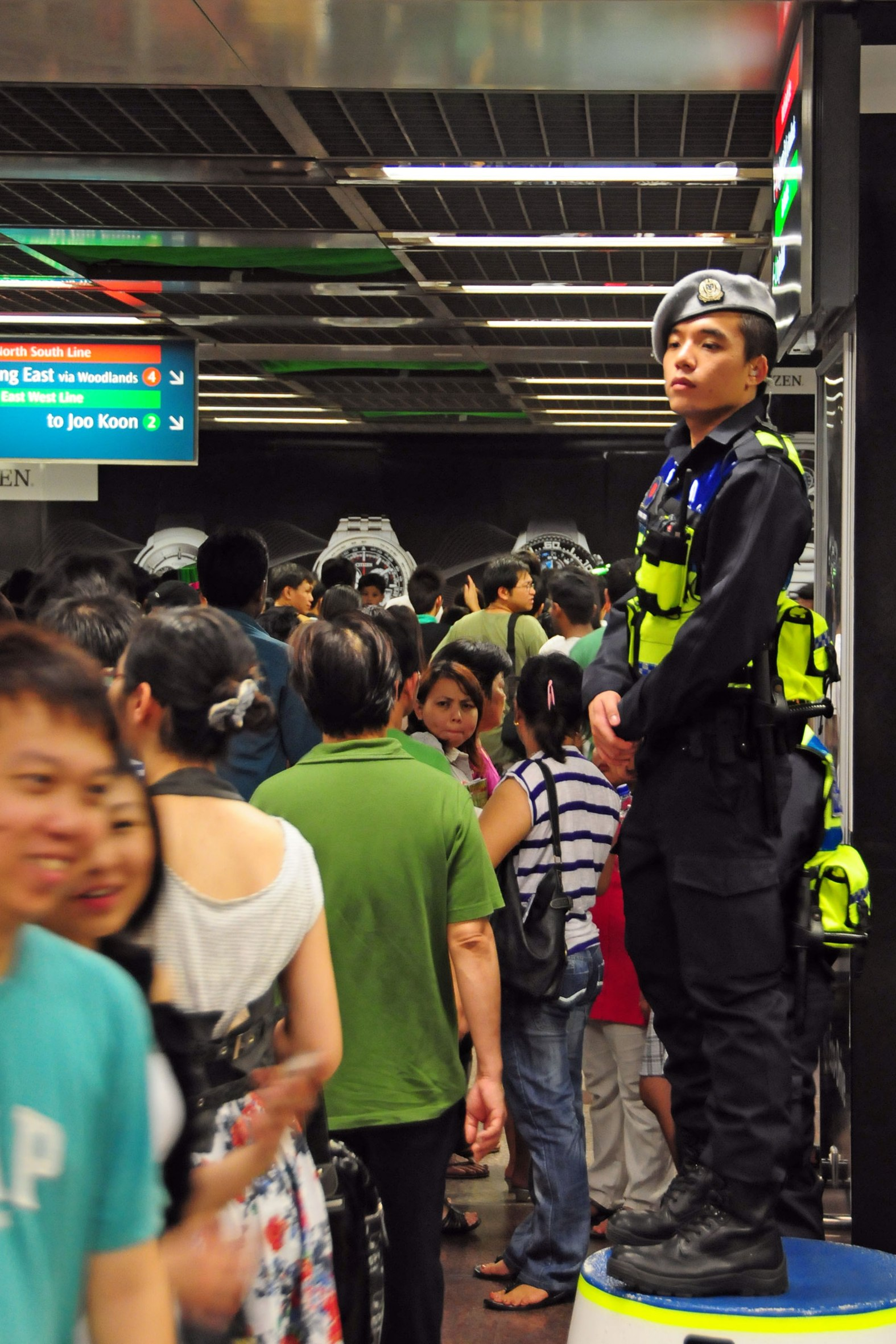
Member of Singapore's Public Transport Security Command keeping watch over train passengers.

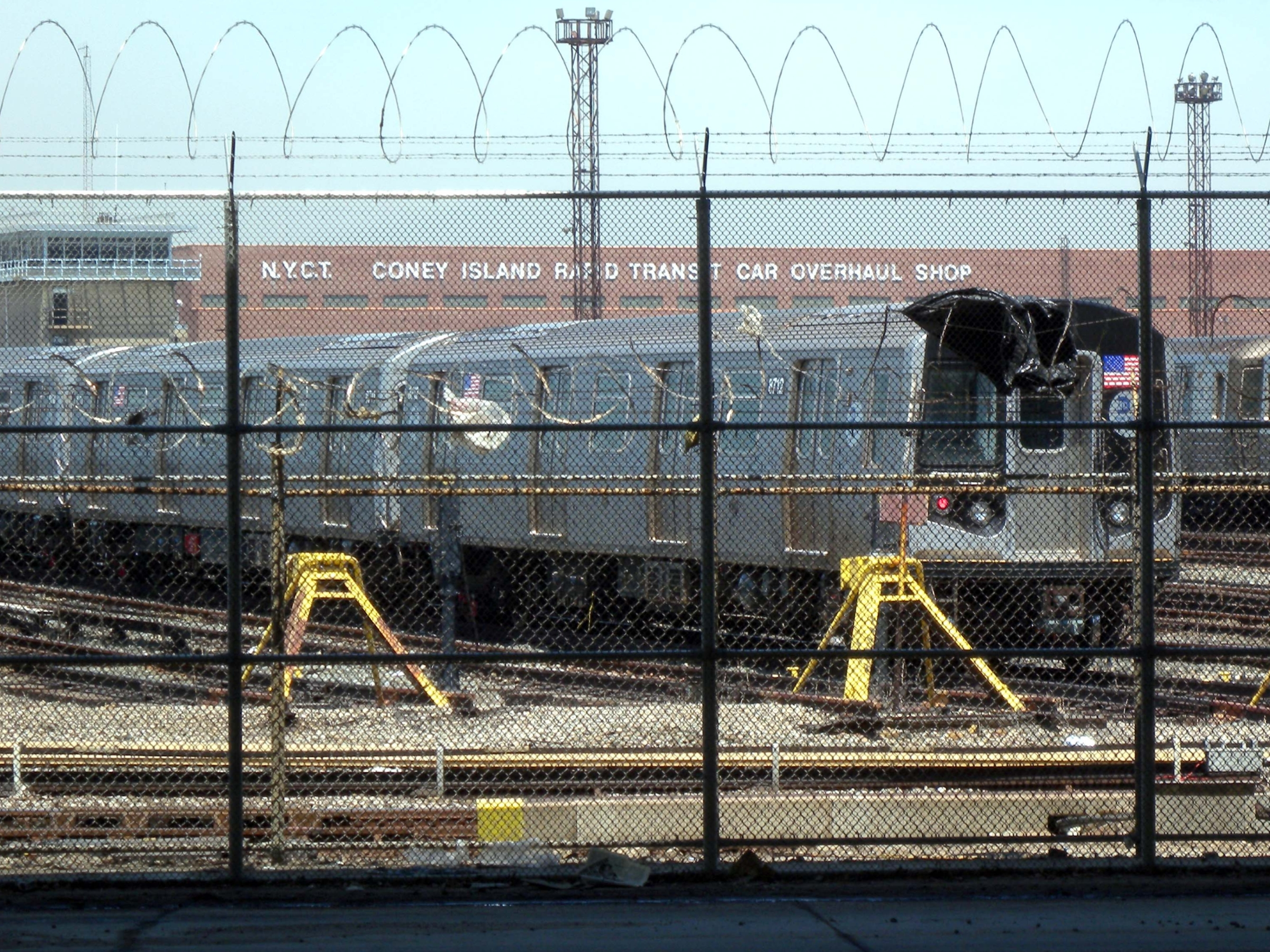
Rail yard in NYC enclosed with security fencing. However, this is primarily intended to deter vandalism such as tagging.

Public transport security refers to measures taken by a mass transit system to keep its passengers and employees safe, to protect the carrier's equipment, and to make sure other violations do not occur. This includes the enforcement of various bye-laws, rules and regulations, human and video surveillance, the deployment of a transit police force, and other techniques.

Public transport security has become a major issue around the world since the September 11 attacks, and especially the 2004 Madrid train bombings.

In the United States, the FBI at times has put the nation's mass transit systems on high alert, and the U.S. Congress has reconsidered cuts in funding following attacks in other parts of the world.. Grants have been given in order to improve security to mass transit systems in the United States, while in the United Kingdom, public transport, due to its "open nature", is considered a major potential target for terrorists.

== Security measures ==
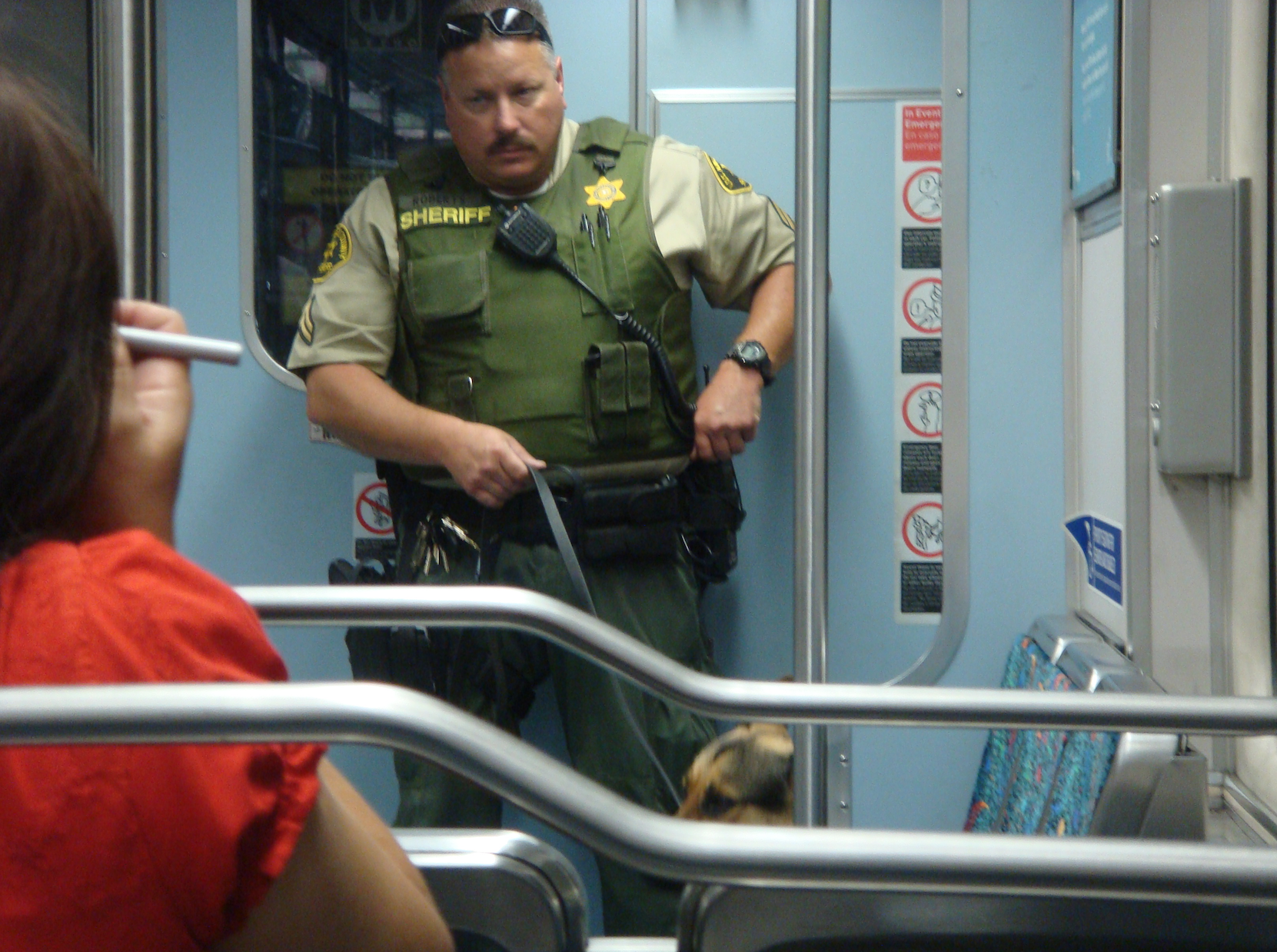
A LASD deputy and a police dog patrol a LA Metro light rail train.

It has been proposed that extra security screening of passengers and their bags would be the best option for preventing weapons or bombs on public transport. However, this would also have a number of negative side effects, which could outweigh the benefits, among them:

- increased (and prohibitive) costs
- reduced public transport convenience, leading to more car travel (and thus road deaths)
- making the queues of people waiting for screening vulnerable to attacks
- creating a sense of fear and a call for further measures and reduced civil liberties

Therefore, most experts recommend against such methods. Like random or profile-based searches of public transport users, they are often considered security theater, because random searches will be unlikely to catch the particular terrorist, and profile-based searching allows the terrorist to reverse engineer the search system, using attackers which are unsuspicious.

Passengers are often instructed to be extra-vigilant, including looking out for persons behaving oddly while on or in the vicinity of mass transit vehicles or stations, being dressed out of character for the weather, or leaving behind bags or packages. However, this has also been criticised as scaremongering, as the likelihood of terror attacks on public transport is, for the individual, very low. Individual attacks are also likely to kill fewer people than an attack on an airplane, and are thus of less attractiveness to terrorists.

Opponents of security theater therefore argue that even very good security around public transport is relatively useless, as it only moves the threat from transport to other targets - such as movie theaters. They instead advocate spending more money on investigative (police and secret service) ways of apprehending terrorists before they can carry out an attack.

Similar arguments have been raised about the United States Federal Air Marshal Service, which provides plainclothes marshals aboard airline flights. According to Congressman John J. Duncan, the air marshals had led to only 4.2 arrests a year, at an average cost of $200 million per arrest. He argued that this represents a win of the perceived dangers of terror, supported by a profit center-type approach, over realistic spending priorities.

== See also ==
- Armoured bus
- Railroad police – Police forces of rail transport
  - British Transport Police – Police force responsible for railways in Britain

=== Vigilante/volunteer ===
- Guardian Angels – American crime prevention organization
- City Angels – Italian volunteer organization
