= Curtis Sliwa =

American politician and talk radio show host (born 1954)

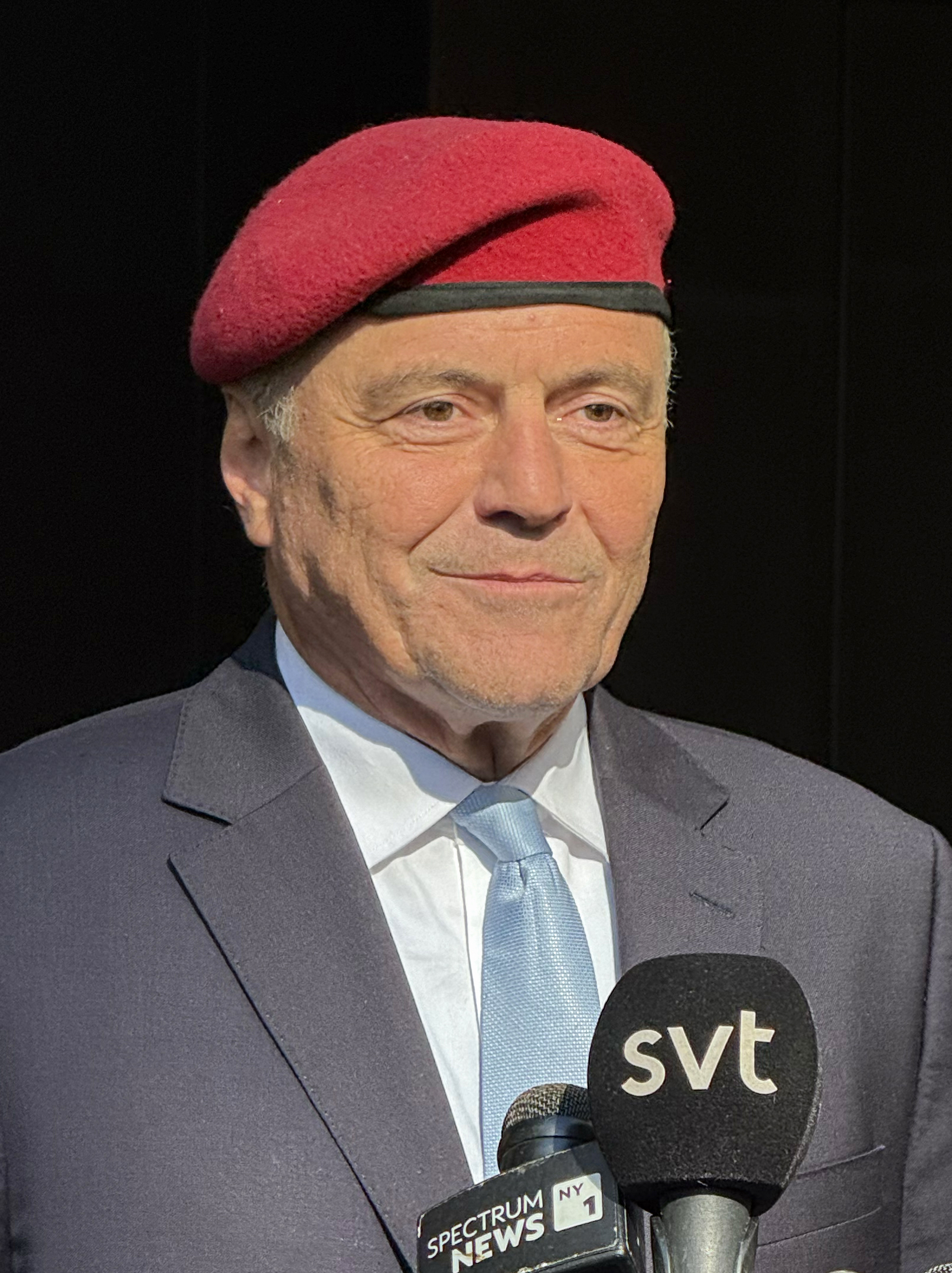
- Sliwa in 2025

Chair of the New York Reform Party
- In office September 2016 – November 2018
- Preceded by: Bill Morrell
- Succeeded by: Bill Morrell

Personal details
- Born: Curtis Anthony Sliwa; March 26, 1954 (age 72) New York City, U.S.
- Party: Republican (before 2016, 2021–present)
- Spouses: Koren Drayton (m. 1976; div. 1977) Lisa Evers (m. 1981; div. 1994) Mary Galda (m. 2000; div. 2012) Nancy Regula (m. 2018)
- Children: 3
- Website: Campaign website

Curtis Anthony Sliwa (/ˈsliːwə/ SLEE-wə; born March 26, 1954) is an American activist, politician, and radio talk show host. He is the founder and chief executive officer of the Guardian Angels, a nonprofit crime-prevention organization headquartered in New York City. Sliwa was twice the unsuccessful Republican nominee for Mayor of New York, being defeated in the 2021 election by Democratic nominee Eric Adams and in 2025 by Democratic nominee Zohran Mamdani.

In 1977, Sliwa founded the safety group "The Magnificent 13" to patrol the Bronx and the New York City Subway overnight. As crime rates spiked across the five boroughs, the group enrolled hundreds of recruits and began to operate throughout the whole city. In 1979, it was re-established as the Guardian Angels. Since then, his leadership has expanded domestically and internationally, covering fourteen countries and over 130 cities. The Angels specialize in crime prevention, self-defense training, youth mentoring, and homeless outreach.

Sliwa has hosted talk shows on local New York radio for over thirty years, on WABC, WNYC, WNYM, and others. He began his radio career in 1990 on WABC-AM and stayed with the station until the 2025 mayoral election, when he quit during a heated live interview. Programs such as Curtis Sliwa Live and Curtis & Kuby in the Morning (with Ron Kuby) have centered predominantly around current affairs from a conservative perspective, often with shock jock humor. As of 2026, he hosts a current affairs morning show with former news anchor Larry Mendte on station 710 WOR.

In addition to his history with the Guardian Angels, Sliwa has engaged in protests and civil disobedience on issues regarding crime and immigration. He has been arrested at least 77 times as of 2023. Sliwa refers to himself as a populist and an outsider, focusing solely on right-wing New York politics. As an influential activist in the city for decades, he has been supported and endorsed by many New York politicians, including Republicans George Pataki, Nicole Malliotakis, and Elise Stefanik, among others. As a candidate, Sliwa likens himself to former mayor Rudy Giuliani, and cites former state governor Pataki as his mentor. His campaigns have highlighted law and order, public safety and policing, poverty and homelessness, and widespread tax cuts on income and property. He is also an ardent animal welfare supporter.

== Early life and education ==
Curtis Anthony Sliwa was born on March 26, 1954, as the second of three children to a Catholic family in Canarsie, Brooklyn. His mother, Francesca "Frances" Bianchino (1924–2017), was a saleswoman native to Brooklyn. Both of Francesca's parents, Fidel and Nicoletta, were Italian immigrants from Bari. His father, Chester Sliwa (1921–2012), was a merchant seaman from Chicago who served in the United States Merchant Marine for 46 years. Both of Chester's parents, Anton and Wanda, were Polish immigrant dairy farmers from Limanowa, with the original surname spelled Śliwa. Sliwa has two sisters, Aleta and Maria.

Sliwa attended St. Matthew's in Crown Heights, and P.S. 114 and Bildersee Junior High School, both in Canarsie. He later attended Brooklyn Preparatory School, a Jesuit high school, where he was class president. Sliwa was expelled from Brooklyn Prep for student activism, after leading protests against the school's dress code. He subsequently attended and graduated from Canarsie High School. In his youth, he worked as a delivery boy for the Daily News, where he was awarded the title of "Newsboy of the Year" and a trip to the White House after he saved several people from a burning building while on a paper route.

Prior to founding the Guardian Angels, he was the night manager of a McDonald's restaurant on Fordham Road in the Bronx.

== Guardian Angels ==
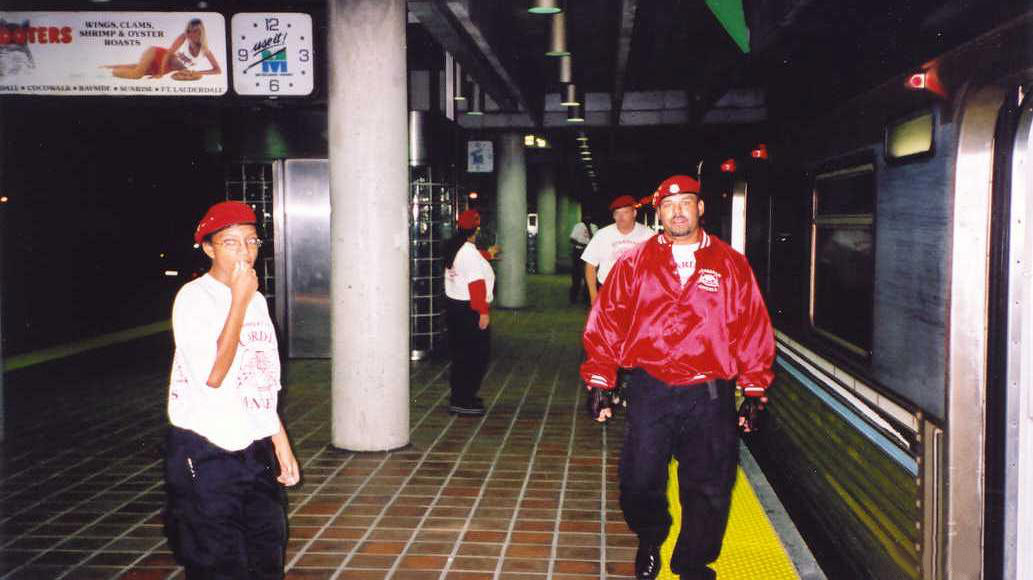
Guardian Angels in Miami Metrorail, 2001

In May 1977, Sliwa created the "Magnificent 13", a civilian group dedicated to combating violence and crime on the New York City Subway. At the time, the city was experiencing a crime wave. The Magnificent 13 grew and was renamed the Guardian Angels in 1979. The group's actions drew strong reactions, both positive and negative.

Most of the Guardian Angels members were either Black or Hispanic. Unarmed, the group required members to train in karate and learn the legal requirements for citizens' arrest before being deployed. Sliwa's red beret is a component of the Guardian Angels' uniform.

In 1981, then-Mayor Ed Koch, a critic of Sliwa and the organization, launched an investigation into the Guardian Angels, which, according to The Washington Post, proved "so positive that the Guardian Angels will soon be awarded some sort of official status." Then-Lieutenant Governor Mario Cuomo was a rare early advocate of the organization, being quoted saying "[t]hey are a better expression of morality than our city deserves".

In the early 1980s, he expanded operations to Buffalo and was often critical of local police policies and practices. One incident involved Guardian Angels member Frank Melvin, who was fatally shot in New Jersey by a Newark police officer in December 1981 after an officer claimed they mistook his unzipping of his jacket – to display his Guardian Angels emblem – as a threat. Sliwa claimed that the killing of Melvin – an African American – was racially motivated, and had been done by a white officer who was being protected by the police department, rather than by the Hispanic officer identified as the shooter. An Essex County grand jury cleared both officers of charges related to Melvin's death.

In late 1992, speaking on the Crown Heights riot and related issues to Hasidic Jews, Sliwa said of the difference between Hasids and Black New Yorkers:

"There is no fear that the Jewish community is going to come to the streets and loot and rob and rape." When in my lifetime have I ever seen a Hasid grab anyone's pocketbook?"

In late November 1992, Sliwa admitted that he and the Guardian Angels faked six early incidents for publicity. He admitted to having faked an injury while fighting rapists, the rescue of a mugging victim, and a false allegation that three off-duty transit police officers had kidnapped him. Sliwa explained at the time his stunts were intended to underscore the dangers of the subways. When the Guardian Angels first began patrolling the streets and subways, New York City was experiencing some of its highest crime rates. "I feel the incidents we staged led to some improvements," he said.

=== 1992 baseball bat attack ===
In April 1992, Sliwa was assaulted outside his Lower East Side home. He was struck by three men, two dozen times, with baseball bats. Sliwa suffered a broken wrist and head injuries from the assault. Prosecutors later argued that John A. Gotti was behind the attack, presenting evidence in court.

=== 1992 attempted assassination ===
On June 19, 1992, Sliwa was kidnapped and shot by two gunmen after entering a stolen taxi in Manhattan. The taxi picked up Sliwa near his home in the East Village, and a gunman hiding in the front passenger seat jumped up and fired several shots, hitting him in the groin and legs. The kidnapping failed when Sliwa leaped from the front window of the moving cab and escaped. Sliwa underwent surgery for internal injuries and leg wounds.

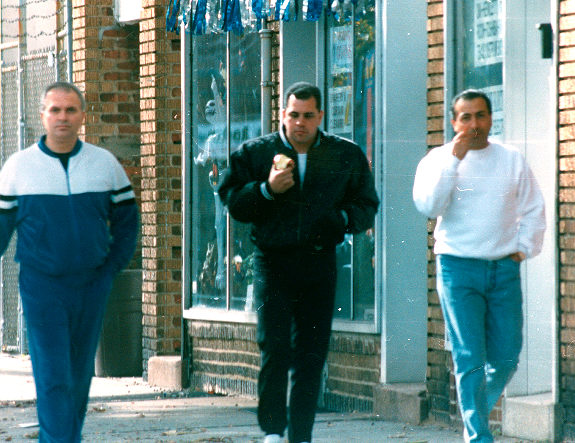
John A. Gotti (middle) in a Federal Bureau of Investigation surveillance photo

Federal prosecutors eventually charged John A. Gotti, the son of Gambino crime family leader John Gotti, with attempted murder and racketeering. Prosecutors claimed that Gotti was angered by remarks Sliwa had made about Gotti's father on his radio program. After three attempts to try him, on September 20, 2005, three separate juries could not agree to convict Gotti on any of the charges brought against him, and the charges were dropped. Jurors later told reporters they believed he had a role in Sliwa's shooting. Prosecutors declined to re-try Gotti and dismissed the charges against him. Sliwa said he would seek damages in civil court.

Michael Yannotti, a Gotti associate, was also charged with shooting Sliwa in the incident but was acquitted.

=== 2020 clash with looters ===
In June 2020, during a riot in the SoHo neighborhood following the murder of George Floyd, Sliwa and several Guardian Angels engaged in a clash with looters while trying to prevent them from robbing a Foot Locker store. Roughly 300 looters were present, variously armed with baseball bats, claw hammers, lock cutters, and machetes. Some of the looters began detonating fireworks and throwing blunt objects at the Angels, including glass bottles and bricks. Sliwa was treated at Bellevue Hospital for a linear fracture of the jaw, while fellow Guardian Angel Aram Sabet suffered a broken eye socket and broken nose. Sabet received 48 stitches.

== Media career ==
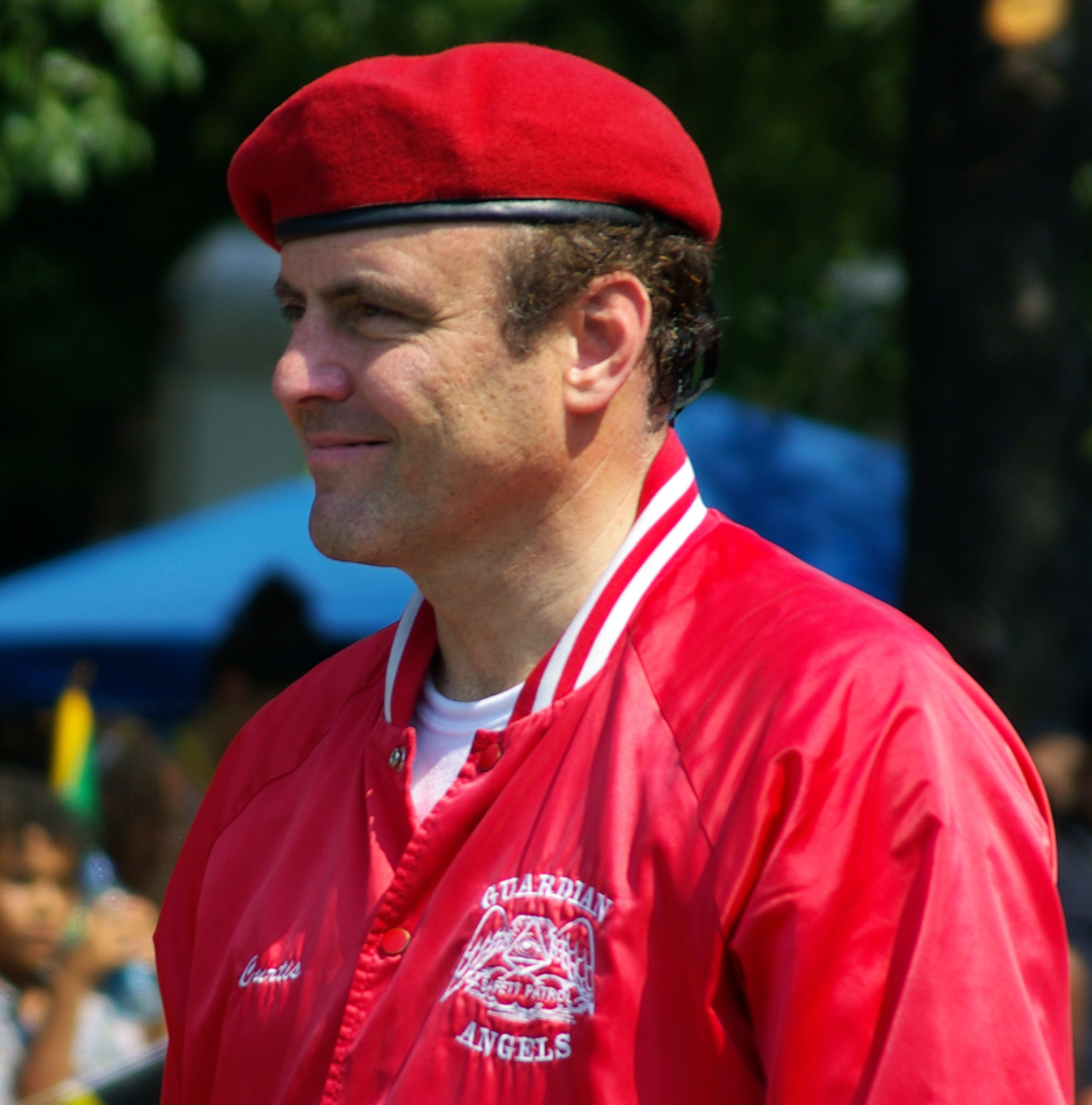
Sliwa in September 2007

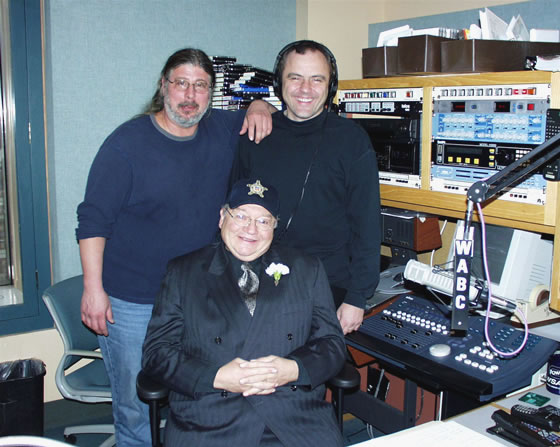
Sliwa (right) and Ron Kuby (left) with U.S. Representative Gary Ackerman (center) in 2005

Sliwa has been a radio broadcaster for three decades, most of that time on WABC-AM, where he began his career in 1990. In 1994, the then city-owned and operated WNYC hired Sliwa, whom WABC had released. Some, including Sliwa, have suggested that he was given access to the station by newly elected Mayor Rudy Giuliani, whom he had supported in the 1993 mayoral race.

As a political conservative, Sliwa has hosted various radio talk shows on WABC since 1996. His longtime broadcast partner was lawyer Ron Kuby, with whom he hosted the "Curtis & Kuby" weekday radio show at noon on WABC-AM in New York City. In 2000, Sliwa and Kuby became the co-hosts of the long-running Curtis and Kuby in the Morning, which lasted eight years before Citadel Broadcasting replaced them with Don Imus.

The Curtis Sliwa LIVE program began national syndication on December 1, 2008. WABC retained Sliwa until November 2009, when his show was cancelled after a contract dispute. He hosted both the morning and evening "drive time" shows on WNYM-AM 970, but as of January 2, 2014, Sliwa returned to WABC, replacing Rush Limbaugh, who moved to WOR-AM. Starting in June 2017, Sliwa's co-host was attorney and television commentator, Eboni Williams. His most recent co-host was Juliet Huddy, who joined the show in February 2019.

In April 2018, Sliwa's radio show was temporarily suspended after making lewd comments about Democratic city-council member Melissa Mark-Viverito. He described Mark-Viverito as "extraordinarily hot" and said that he has fantasized about having sex with her. Sliwa also added "Melissa I'm [your] papi, right?"; while also claiming he had sex with three other members of the City Council. Mark-Viverito criticized Sliwa on Twitter, attacking him as sexist. Sliwa later apologized for the comments, describing them as "a parody, or a satire". In May 2018, NY1 announced that Sliwa's radio show would be unsuspended.

After officially declaring his candidacy in March 2021, Sliwa's radio program went on hiatus. His programs once again went on hiatus upon the announcement of his second candidacy in February 2025.

In October 2025, Sliwa and John Catsimatidis, WABC-AM's owner, got into a heated on-air shouting match. Catsimatidis repeated his calls for Sliwa to drop out of the 2025 NYC mayoral election, in order to help boost Andrew Cuomo's chances of beating Zohran Mamdani in the election. This led to Sliwa attacking the station and immediately quitting WABC. Sliwa told Sid Rosenberg, "You will never see me in the studios of WABC again. Never. No matter how this election turns out".

Curtis Sliwa was hired by the news-talk station 710 WOR-AM on March 9, 2026. Sliwa is co-hosting the show along with radio/TV veteran Larry Mendte. Their daily morning show is called "Curtis Sliwa and Larry Mendte In the Morning."

== Political career ==
In 2007, Sliwa announced an intention to reinvigorate New York City's Republican party, and possibly run for office. In 2013, Sliwa endorsed Republican candidate John Catsimatidis for mayor.

In September 2016, Sliwa and Frank Morano launched a successful hostile takeover of the Reform Party of New York State. The Party lost its ballot access in the November 2018 elections.

=== 2021 mayoral campaign ===
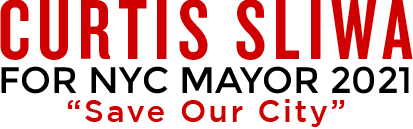
Sliwa's 2021 campaign logo

Sliwa announced on March 8, 2020, that he would run for mayor of New York City in 2021 as a Republican.

The primary race turned Sliwa and Fernando Mateo, once friends, into bitter rivals. The Manhattan, Queens, and Bronx Republican parties endorsed Mateo, while the Staten Island and Brooklyn Republican parties endorsed Sliwa. Sliwa criticized Mateo for donating to the 2017 re-election campaign of Mayor Bill de Blasio, a Democrat, and also accused Mateo of breaking the law; Mateo replied that Sliwa's accusations were bogus and shameful.

During the campaign, Mateo and Sliwa clashed over loyalty to former president Donald Trump. Mateo voiced support for Trump's false claim that he won the 2020 presidential election; by contrast, Sliwa did not support Trump in either 2016 or 2020 and does not support Trump's election denial. The unofficial results showed Sliwa winning by 72 to 28 percent.

Sliwa ran on a platform opposing the defund the police movement, supporting a property tax overhaul so that working-class residents would not pay higher property taxes than wealthy citizens, keeping in place the Specialized High Schools Admissions Test while increasing opportunities for vocational training in charter schools, and focusing on fiscal restraint. He also opposed the killing of unwanted animals and supported making all animal shelters no-kill shelters, pointing to his own home life with 16 cats.

Sliwa campaigned on beginning a trial program to test out the feasibility of universal basic income in New York City.

Sliwa lost to Brooklyn Borough President Eric Adams in a landslide defeat in the general election on November 2, 2021, with Adams winning just over two-thirds of the votes. Sliwa conceded that same night, calling for unity in order to save New York City.

After his loss, he brought two cats outside the Brooklyn home of Adams in January 2023, after the latter had been fined for rodent violations, and suggested that feral cats could address the rodent problem in the city.

=== 2025 mayoral campaign ===
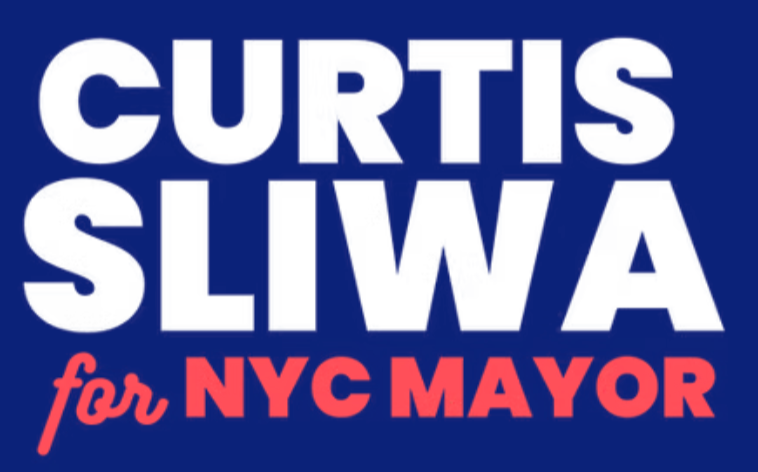
Sliwa's 2025 campaign logo

On February 13, 2025, Sliwa announced his candidacy to run for mayor of New York City in 2025, again as a Republican. During his candidacy, he apologized for past statements regarding the city's Hasidic population and criticized ICE's detainments of immigrants coming to courthouses for appointments and deportation without due process: "everybody gets due process in the United States."

A mid-July 2025 poll of registered NYC voters found Sliwa coming in third, with 13%. The pattern continued into early September, with Sliwa placing third, after Democratic nominee Zohran Mamdani and independent candidate Andrew Cuomo, but ahead of incumbent mayor Eric Adams. Throughout the election, Sliwa rejected calls for him to exit the race in order to help defeat Mamdani, including pressure from Trump and, Sliwa said, from billionaires who had offered to pay him to drop out.

In spite of strong opposition from various billionaires and national Republicans to stay in the race, Sliwa received support from most GOP leaders in the five boroughs. In response to Andrew Cuomo calling Sliwa a "spoiler" and saying that "Curtis will make Mamdani a winner", Sliwa stated, "I suggest Andrew Cuomo come off his high horse. If he wants to win this election, go out and campaign for your voters."

It was debated whether or not Sliwa ending his campaign would have boosted Cuomo's campaign or allowed him to defeat Mamdani. An AARP poll conducted in October showed Cuomo with 41% against Mamdani's 44% if Sliwa were to step aside, within the poll's margin of error. Sliwa firmly rejected this poll and many others throughout the campaign, saying, "I don't believe in polls. I believe you have to have a get-out-the-vote effort." A spokesperson for the Sliwa campaign has said, "The overwhelming majority of Sliwa supporters would not touch Andrew Cuomo with a ten-foot pole." Sliwa, having consistently rebuked calls to drop out, voted for himself on the first day of early voting on October 26; he urged his supporters to show up for early voting as well.

Sliwa received 7% of the vote, placing behind both Cuomo, and Mamdani who won the election with over 51% of the vote.

=== Future ===
In May 2026, Sliwa expressed interest in running for Mayor of New York again in the 2029 election.

== Political positions ==
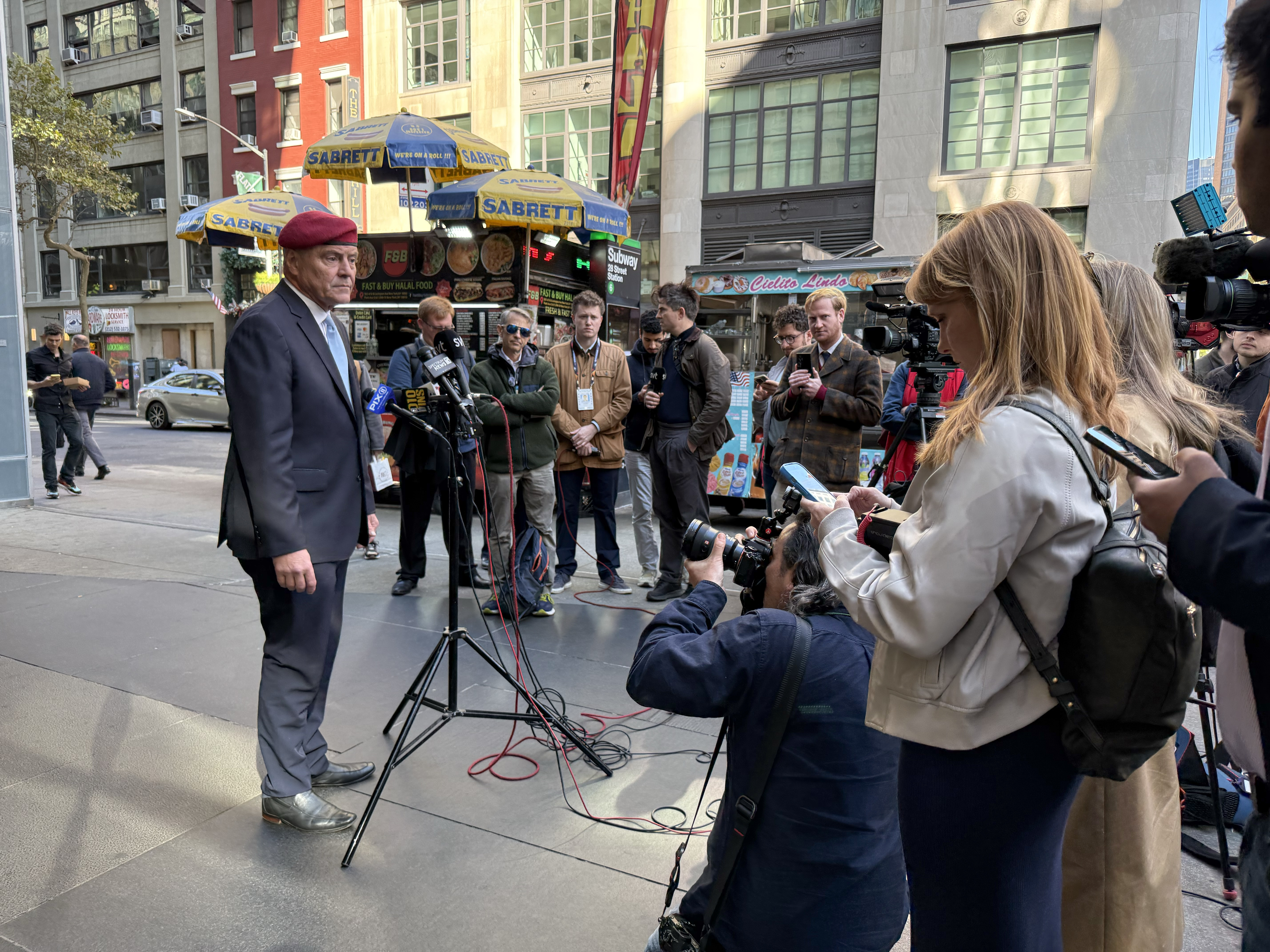
Sliwa at a press conference in October 2025

Sliwa is considered a populist Republican unaffiliated with the MAGA movement. He supports ranked-choice voting, same-sex marriage, separation of church and state, pro-choice stances, gun control, and is sympathetic to the idea of implementing universal basic income in New York City. Fiscally, he supports launching a property tax against major New York institutions (including Madison Square Garden, Columbia University, and New York University), yet wants to alleviate taxes on individual New Yorkers, including no property tax for elderly homeowners, and a five-year moratorium on income tax for those graduating from college who stay in the city. He opposes vaccine mandates, critical race theory, congestion pricing, and sanctuary cities.

Sliwa is a staunch supporter of the New York City Police Department (NYPD). He opposes the defund the police movement, Black Lives Matter, and no-cash bail; he additionally wants to recruit thousands of new officers for the city. He is in support of stop-and-frisk measures implemented by previous mayors, including Rudy Giuliani, but is opposed to a daily quota of stops per officer. Sliwa additionally is against the closing of Rikers Island's prison facilities, which the New York City Council voted for in 2019.

Sliwa has campaigned on converting the tens of thousands of vacant rent-controlled apartments and commercial spaces in New York City into affordable housing, as opposed to building further units. He is in favor of school choice and expanding access to charter schools in the city, in addition to prioritizing job-readiness and financial literacy throughout city classrooms.

Throughout time, Sliwa has gone back and forth in his opinions on President Donald Trump, saying he has a "love-hate relationship" with him. The two men have known each other for decades as prominent New York City conservatives. In 2013, Sliwa had Trump as a guest on his WABC radio program. In December 2019, Sliwa declared in an interview that Trump was a "screwball and a crackpot". In February 2021, weeks after Trump left office, Sliwa switched his registration from the New York Reform Party back to the Republican Party. Sliwa has stated that he did not vote for Trump in the 2016 or 2020 presidential elections. He did vote for Trump in 2024. In the 2025 campaign, he has said, "[Trump] should stay out of [New York politics]", choosing to run a localized and grassroots campaign. Trump himself has never endorsed Sliwa, referring to him during the 2025 campaign as "not exactly prime-time", and instead endorsed Andrew Cuomo for mayor.

In August 2025, he criticized Mayor Eric Adams for failing to solve the city's rat problem, despite Adams having appointed a "rat czar" in 2023. Sliwa suggested that feral cats let loose in the city would be a more effective way of dealing with rats than the current methods employed. He also said that he would convert Gracie Mansion to a home for animals on death row.

In March 2026, Sliwa acted in a skit titled “Paging Dr. Cliwa,” collaborating with New York City mayor Zohran Mamdani to raise awareness for pet adoption. Following the skit, Republicans and Democrats accused Curtis Sliwa of making a nonaggression pact with Zohran Mamdani during 2025 in order to make former New York governor Andrew Cuomo lose the New York City mayoral election. Sliwa stated that he agreed to participate in the skit due to supporting pet adoption as opposed to euthanization. Sliwa denied accusations of colluding with Mamdani during the 2025 New York City mayoral election.

In October 2026, Sliwa and Mamdani received their flu shots together as part of a social media campaign encouraging New Yorkers to get vaccinated.

=== Anti-illegal immigration rallies and apprehension ===
In late August 2023, Sliwa, along with four other organizers, were arrested after an anti-illegal immigration rally outside Gracie Mansion. Police issued a desk appearance ticket on misdemeanor charges of resisting arrest and obstruction, but the Manhattan district attorney's office declined to prosecute. Sliwa had been arrested at several previous rallies. As of 2023, Sliwa has been arrested 77 times.

In February 2024, Sliwa and other Guardian Angels apprehended a New York man, claiming that he was an immigrant and claiming that migrants had "taken over," during a segment on Fox News. The man was issued a summons for disorderly conduct, as police described him as "acting in a loud and threatening manner on a public sidewalk". No Guardian Angels were charged in regard to the incident.

== Personal life ==
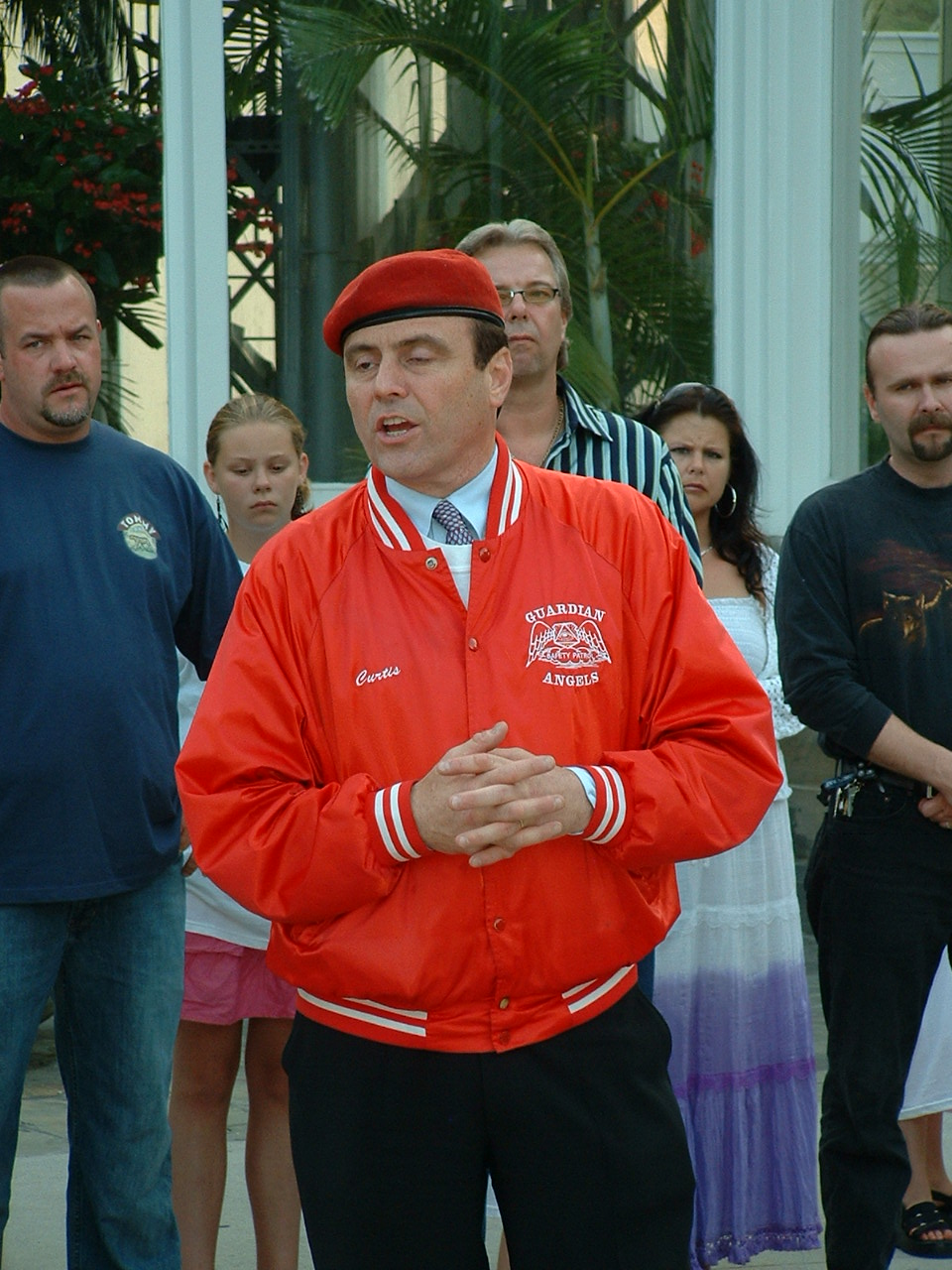
Sliwa at a Toronto gathering in July 2006

Sliwa is a Catholic, while his two sons with Melinda Katz are Jewish.

Sliwa is a noted animal lover; he has cared for as many as 17 cats, but as of September 2025 was down to 6. During his 2025 mayoral campaign, he said he believed there was an underestimated population of animal-loving voters in New York City who his mayoral candidacy would resonate with.

Sliwa has competed in multiple eating contests. In 1994, Sliwa won the Carnegie Deli's annual sour pickle-eating contest, becoming world champion. Sliwa has also competed in Nathan's Hot Dog Eating Contest, ranking third in both 1994 and 1996, eating 13 and 14 hot dogs respectively.

In 2010, Sliwa was diagnosed with prostate cancer, which he announced publicly in April 2011. That September, he underwent robotic surgery and had the cancer removed.

=== Relationships ===
Sliwa has been married five times.

==== Koren Drayton ====
Sliwa wed his first wife, Koren Drayton, in 1975. The couple divorced one year later. Little is publicly known about Drayton, other that she is Caribbean-American, was from the Virgin Islands, and lived in Brownsville. Sliwa has stated that he has not spoken to Drayton since their divorce.

==== Lisa Evers ====
Sliwa wed his second wife, Lisa Evers, on Christmas Eve 1981. He became infatuated with her after she accidentally broke his foot and dislocated his knee at Guardian Angel demonstrations. They divorced in 1994; Sliwa has stated that their relationship began to fall apart following John A. Gotti's attempted assassination on his life.

At the time of their marriage, Evers was the National Director of the Guardian Angels and co-hosted a WABC-AM radio show called Angels in the Morning. She is also a martial arts expert, holding a black belt in Karate, who briefly trained with the World Wrestling Federation in 1986.

==== Mary Paterson ====
In 2000, Sliwa married his third wife, Mary (née Galda), a former WABC employee who also served as the Guardian Angels' national director. They have one son, Anthony, born circa 2004. They divorced in 2012, after she accused him of infidelity. In 2019, she married former New York State governor David Paterson and took his surname.

Sliwa and Paterson have both stated that they have kept in contact following their divorce, and maintain a good relationship.

==== Melinda Katz ====
Sliwa was in a relationship with Melinda Katz, the Queens County District Attorney. Unlike Sliwa, Katz is a member of the Democratic Party. The pair first met in 1993, but didn't begin dating until much later. They later dated for two years, having their first date in Rockefeller State Park Preserve. In 1998, after Katz had an ovary removed, she asked Curtis to serve as a sperm donor to her, to which he agreed.

The pair reconnected in 2011, and Sliwa separated from her in 2014; they have two children together, conceived in vitro over the previous five years. In court documents, Sliwa's ex-wife, Mary, accused him of diverting money to Katz while still married to Mary, as part of a plan to build a "nest egg" with Katz prior to moving in with her. The lawsuit was later dismissed.

==== Nancy Regula ====
On July 5, 2018, Sliwa wed his longtime girlfriend, animal activist and attorney Nancy Regula, at the Howe Caverns.

Regula is a licensed attorney, animal rights activist, member of the Guardian Angels, and political candidate. In 2018, she was the Reform candidate for New York Attorney General election; she finished with 0.4% of the vote. In 2021, she was the Republican candidate for the New York City Council, District 6 election; she finished with 13.2%.

== Filmography ==
Acting roles

Year	Film	Credited as
1998	The Siege	Newscaster
2005	Soft Money	Himself

In popular culture

- We're Fighting Back (1981): A TV movie from Lou Antonio, loosely inspired by Sliwa and the Guardian Angels. Sliwa was unhappy with the film, and unsuccessfully filed a lawsuit against Highway Pictures for $5 million. He described the film as "materially false, fabricated and misleading."
- Vigilante: The Incredible True Story of Curtis Sliwa and the Guardian Angels (2018): A documentary covering Sliwa's life in the Guardian Angels.
- Saturday Night Live - Season 51, Episode 4 (2025): Comedian Shane Gillis portrays Sliwa in a sketch.
- Paging Dr Cliwa (2026): A comedy skit, created by the New York Mayor, Zohran Mamdani, for April Fools Day. Where Curtis Sliwa played Dr Shurtis Cliwa.

== Electoral history ==
2025 New York City mayoral election
Party	Candidate	Votes	%	±%
Democratic	Zohran Mamdani	944,950	43.07%	−22.12%
Working Families	Zohran Mamdani	169,234	7.71%	N/A
Total	Zohran Mamdani	1,114,184	50.78%	−16.21%
Fight and Deliver	Andrew Cuomo	906,614	41.32%	N/A
Republican	Curtis Sliwa	143,305	6.53%	−20.37%
Protect Animals	Curtis Sliwa	10,444	0.48%	N/A
Total	Curtis Sliwa	153,749	7.01%	−19.89%
Safe&Affordable/EndAntiSemitism	Eric Adams (incumbent) (withdrawn)	6,897	0.31%	N/A
Conservative	Irene Estrada	2,856	0.13%	−0.99%
Integrity	Jim Walden (withdrawn)	2,319	0.11%	N/A
Quality of Life	Joseph Hernandez	1,379	0.06%	N/A
Write-in		6,206	0.28%	−0.34%
Total votes		2,194,204	100%	
Democratic hold				

2025 New York City Republican mayoral primary
Party	Candidate	Votes	%
Republican	Curtis Sliwa	Uncontested	N/A

2021 New York City mayoral election
Party	Candidate	Votes	%
Democratic	Eric Adams	753,801	66.99%
Republican	Curtis Sliwa	312,385	27.76%

2021 New York City Republican mayoral primary
Party	Candidate	Votes	%
Republican	Curtis Sliwa	40,794	67.9%
Republican	Fernando Mateo	16,719	27.8%

Party political offices
Preceded by Nicole Malliotakis	Republican nominee for Mayor of New York City; 2021, 2025	Most recent
