= Śliwa (disambiguation) =

Śliwa is a Polish surname.

Śliwa may also refer to:

- Śliwa, Warmian-Masurian Voivodeship, Poland
- J.P. Śliwa, the third solo album by Polish rock singer Piotr Rogucki
