= Tony Ricciardi =

American businessman

Anthony Ricciardi is the co-founder of The Templeton Group in New York City. He was also the Director of NYMUG (The New York Mac User Group) from 1997 to 1998.

He has been a prominent fixture on the New York City Macintosh Scene for over 30 years and has been a Technology writer and pundit for publications such as Red Herring, Webmaster, Silicon Alley Reporter, Fortune, CNET and The New York Times.

The Templeton Group has provided extensive Macintosh consulting services for many Fortune 500 firms in New York City since 1997.

In 1995 he founded inet.d, a New York Internet Development firm. inet.d was one of the pioneering web companies in the early days of New York's famed Silicon Alley. inet.d created websites for Compaq Computers, The United Nations, GMHC and designed the first campaign website for Mayoral Candidate Rudy Giuliani.

He has appeared in CyberAngels on CNET Television as well as interviews with The Discovery Channel and NY1 News.

He lives and works in New York City.
