= Guardian Angels =

American crime prevention organization

- Founded: February 14, 1979
- Founder: Curtis Sliwa
- Purpose: Public security
- Location: New York City, United States
- Region served: Global
- Website: guardianangels.org

The Guardian Angels is an American nonprofit volunteer organization with the goal of unarmed crime prevention. The organization was founded by Curtis Sliwa in New York City on February 14, 1979.

Sliwa originally created the Guardian Angels to combat violence and crime on the New York City Subway. The organization originally trained members to make citizen's arrests for violent crimes. Members patrolled streets and neighborhoods without involving the police or any external authority, and they provided educational programs for schools and businesses.

In December 2024, Sliwa told the New York Post that the group's focus would shift to include wellness checks on homeless people, as well as people who seemed emotionally distressed.

== History ==
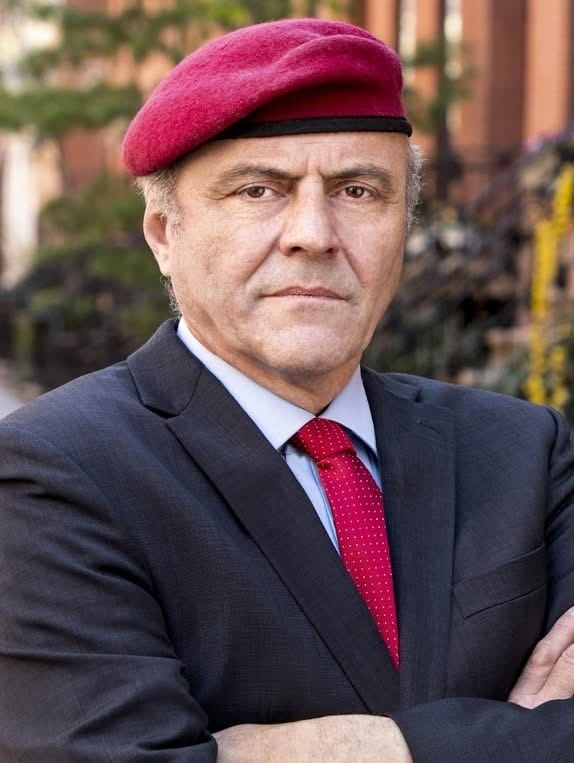
Curtis Sliwa, the founder of the Guardian Angels

Initially, New York City Mayor Ed Koch publicly opposed the group. Over the years, the controversy has diminished. As citizen involvement and outreach have increased, there has been less public opposition to the group by administration officials. Koch later reversed his stance on the organization, and former New York City Mayors Rudy Giuliani and Michael Bloomberg have publicly supported the group.

== Rules and activities ==
The original and primary activity of the Guardian Angels is "safety patrol", in which members walk the streets or ride public transit. Guardian Angels must be in uniform to represent the organization. They can be identified by their red berets and red jackets, or white T-shirts with the Guardian Angels' logo in red—an eye inside a pyramid on a winged shield.

Chapters of the Guardian Angels operate similarly to franchise networks, by supporting each other regionally according to standard rules, regulations, and training. The organization states that it offers equal opportunity and encourages diversity.

The organization accepts volunteers who have no recent or serious criminal record, as well as those who do not belong to a gang or a racial-hate group. To join the safety patrol program, members must be at least 16 years old; youth programs are offered for younger applicants. Safety patrol members are prohibited from carrying weapons, and they physically search each other before patrolling. Members are trained in first aid, cardiopulmonary resuscitation (CPR), law, conflict resolution, communication, and basic martial arts. Members are paired and follow the directions of a patrol leader. If there is danger to their own or other citizens' lives or health, they are allowed to do whatever is lawful and necessary.

The Guardian Angels have also begun to include the following:

- youth programs
- teacher programs
- disaster response
- an Internet safety program called CyberAngels
- self-defense courses
- community outreach programs to address issues beyond crime

The Guardian Angels do not demand or request money on subways. During the 1980s, when members were often seen there, impersonators would wear the Guardian Angels' characteristic attire (including red berets) and solicit money.

=== CyberAngels program ===
The CyberAngels program was founded in 1995 by Colin Gabriel Hatcher as an online "neighborhood watch". Originally, the group monitored chat rooms to apprehend sexual predators. Later, based on what it had learned from the program to date, the group changed the focus to educating police, schools, and families about online abuse and cybercrime. Tony Ricciardi, the co-founder of The Templeton Group, was an early member of the group.

== Chapters ==
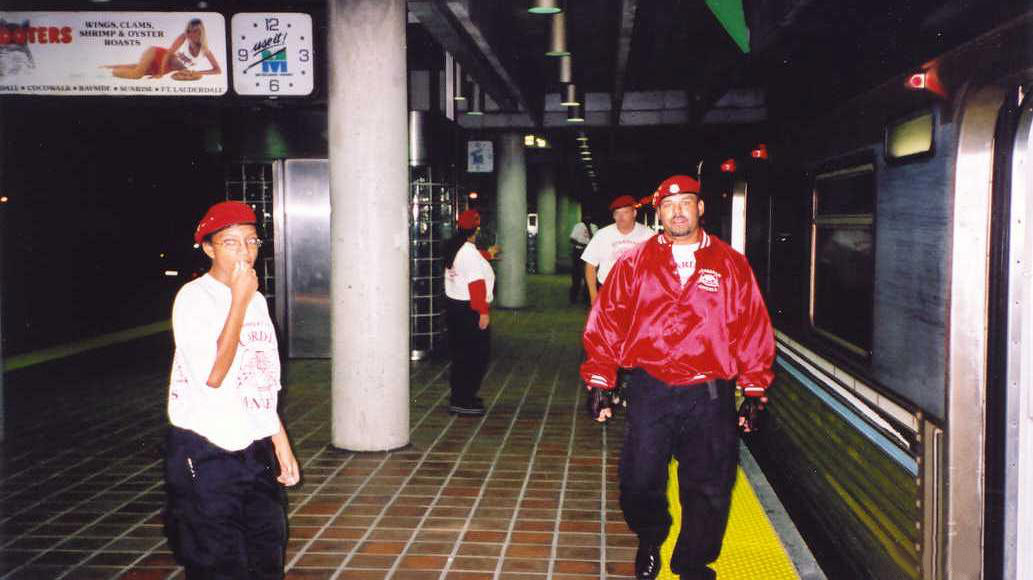
Guardian Angels in a Metrorail station in Miami

=== Expansion in the United States ===
Outside of New York City, the Guardian Angels first established chapters in larger US cities, such as Washington, D.C., New Orleans, Los Angeles, San Diego, San Francisco, Fresno, Chicago, Philadelphia, Boston, Denver, Dallas, Houston, Savannah, and Seattle. The organization also established chapters in larger cities in other countries; these cities included London, Toronto, Tokyo, Cape Town, Auckland, and York. Subsequently, the organization established chapters in smaller US cities, such as Springfield and Brockton, Massachusetts; Sacramento and Stockton, California; and Portland, Maine. In May 2011, a chapter was organized in Indianapolis. The Los Angeles, York, Pennsylvania, and Sacramento chapters collaborated with law enforcement officers and agencies.

=== Selected local operations ===
The Tampa Bay region of Florida has had two Guardian Angels chapters. The first Tampa chapter was established in 1984 and lasted until 1992. A second chapter was established in 1999. In 2017, when the Seminole Heights serial killer, Howell Emanuel Donaldson III, was active in the city's Seminole Heights neighborhood, the Tampa Bay chapter patrolled the streets of the neighborhood.

The Guardian Angels have been active in Orlando, Florida, because of the increase in murder and crime rates.

In 2016, the Washington, D.C. chapter announced that it would increase its presence on the Washington Metro following an increase in violent crime.

== Outside the United States ==
=== Australia ===
Several Guardian Angels chapters have been formed in Australia:

- A chapter actively patrolled in Sydney during the early 1990s, but it disbanded soon after.
- A chapter was formed in Brisbane during the 1990s, after Curtis Sliwa and Sebastian Metz visited the city.
- A chapter was planned to form in Canberra c. 2010, calling for volunteers to patrol the City and Woden bus interchanges.
- In 2017, a branch was formed in the city of Logan in Queensland. They initially patrolled local parks, but they have since patrolled streets and other public areas.
- In 2019, a chapter was formed in Melbourne in 2019, and it closed twelve months later in 2020.

=== Canada ===
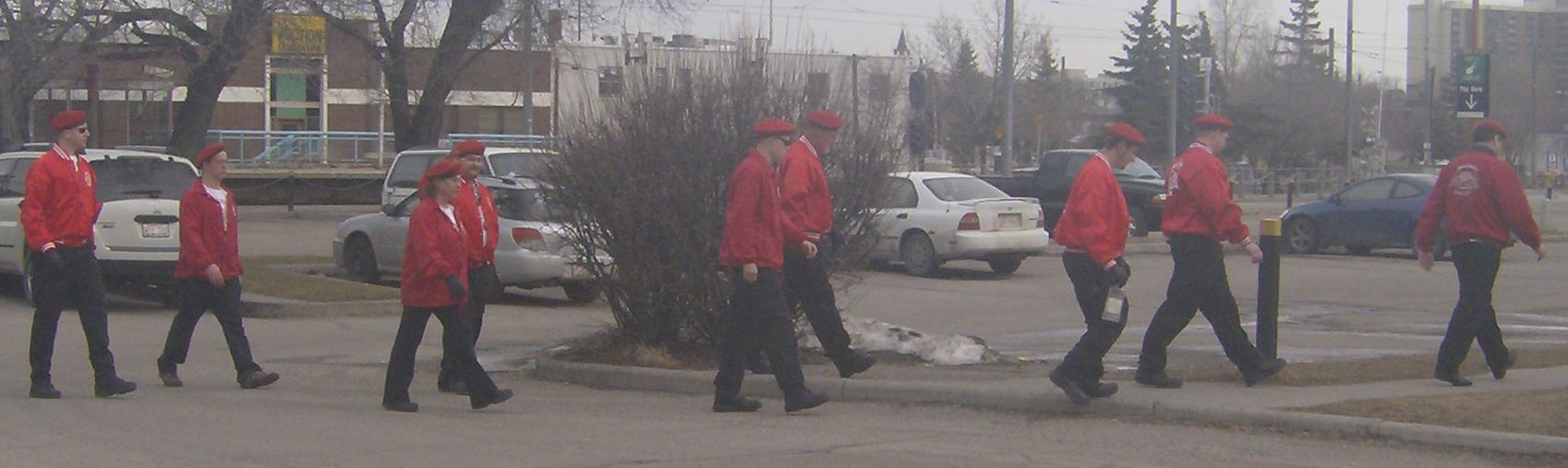
Calgary, Alberta, on March 24, 2007: A group of Guardian Angel trainees went on a final training patrol, the day before their expected graduation. They toured the east side of the downtown area.

Several chapters of the Guardian Angels were formed in Canada from the 1980s onward. However, as of 2024, there is no record of active chapters in the country.

==== Toronto ====
A Toronto chapter was originally formed in 1982 and operated until 1984. A smaller chapter operated briefly in the Parkdale neighborhood in 1992–1993, but it later disbanded.

The 2005 Boxing Day shooting resulted in the death of teenager Jane Creba on a busy downtown street; this incident provoked renewed attention to law-and-order issues in Canada. Curtis Sliwa said that he was contacted by many Torontonians interested in a local chapter of the Guardian Angels. On July 13, 2006, a new chapter of the Guardian Angels Canada was formed in Toronto. However, both Mayor David Miller and police chief Bill Blair expressed a lack of interest in trying a solution that had failed twice previously. When Sliwa and three other Guardian Angels arrived in Toronto, Miller declined to meet them, commenting that police work was best left to the police. Despite opposition by the mayor, the police chief, and community groups, the Toronto chapter proceeded. The 2006 mayoral candidate Jane Pitfield expressed her support for the Guardian Angels, as did former television anchor Peter Kent and former professional boxer Spider Jones (now the host of a radio talk show). Toronto's first group of Guardian Angels went on their inaugural patrol on July 13, 2006, in the city's downtown core. The group's official launch in the city came just two days after members were forced to relocate their graduation ceremony from a seniors' residence on Dundas Street.

==== Other cities in Canada ====
Several other chapters were formed in Canada:

- Vancouver had a chapter during the early 1980s, and a chapter was in operation there as of November 2006. Some alumni from the earlier group assisted with the later chapter.
- An attempt to organize a chapter in Ottawa failed because of a lack of cooperation from the police and the city, in addition to a negative reaction and lack of interest from most of the public.
- A chapter was established in Calgary, with the first group completing its training in March 2007.
- A Halifax chapter was in operation as of May 2008. Recent outbreaks of violent crime in Halifax had prompted residents to contact the Guardian Angels, urging them to start a chapter in the city.

=== Germany ===
In 1993, Guardian Angels chapters were founded in several German cities, such as Berlin and Hamburg, to patrol the local S-Bahn (urban-suburban rail) and U-Bahn (rapid transit) facilities. The organization remains active in Hanover and has been renamed Schutzengel (the German translation of 'Guardian Angels').

=== Japan ===
A national organization of the Guardian Angels was formed in Japan in 1996. This organization has chapters in most of the major cities, and it is second only to the United States in membership and activities. Keiji Oda, the founder and president of the Guardian Angels Japan, joined the Boston and New York City chapters during the 1980s. The concept of the Guardian Angels initially faced opposition in Japan, but Oda convinced government officials that the organization would be run by Japanese members on behalf of the Japanese people, and that the principles of the organization were universal (not just American). Official acceptance culminated in a meeting with the Prime Minister Junichiro Koizumi in 2005. The Guardian Angels were the first community organization in Japan to be granted nonprofit status.

=== Mexico ===
In 2007, a chapter was formed in Mexico City, led by the Canadian professional wrestler Vampiro.

=== New Zealand ===
The history of the Guardian Angels in New Zealand begins in 2006–2007:

- In January 2006, the Guardian Angels opened its New Zealand Headquarters in Henderson, a suburb of West Auckland, New Zealand. The National Director was Andy "Chieftain" Cawston.
- The country's inaugural Guardian Angels patrol was held on January 13, 2006. The organization was active in South Auckland for a brief period.
- On August 30, 2007, Curtis Sliwa graduated from the Auckland CBD chapter, led by Anna "Kimodo" Cruse. This chapter's first official patrol took place the following evening.
- Members of the Wellington chapter held their inaugural training and orientation patrol on October 6, 2006, in the Auckland CBD.

Within New Zealand, the international Alliance of Guardian Angels was recognized and registered as a charitable trust for tax purposes. The organization's headquarters were located in the Waitakere Community Center, Ratanui Street, Henderson.

In 2016, the New Zealand chapters disbanded.

=== The Philippines ===
The Philippines chapter of the Guardian Angels has made several contributions within police organizational efforts, including the following:

- Cybertanod—a combination of 'cyber' and 'tanod', meaning 'cyber-watchman'
- Role Model Cop
- Barangay Peacekeeping Action Teams (BPATs) of The Philippine National Police

Joint police programs with the Guardian Angels led to national awards for officers and local police stations where the Guardian Angels operate.

The Philippines chapter covered Southern Mindanao and recently expanded into Northern Luzon. Today, the chapter aims to spread the program around Southeast Asia, and it is currently developing an independent "citizen police organization" concept for the region. The national chapter is gathering support to host the first annual, international joint patrol—with the police and the Guardian Angels—for citizen safety; this is part of the Guardian Angels' cross-border initiatives on violence prevention and a global campaign for public safety awareness. The effort in Southeast Asia is overseen by Mike Zarate, National Director for the Philippines.

=== South Africa ===
The South African chapter of the Guardian Angels was started by Carl Viljoen in Cape Town in 2004. Other chapters exist in two locations: Kuilsrivier in the Western Cape, and Potchefstroom in North West province.

=== United Kingdom ===
In London, the Guardian Angels is an independent, nonprofit, non-political voluntary organization; its main purpose is to tackle violent crime, act as positive role models for young people, and serve local communities. This branch was formed on May 14, 1989, but by 2007, its numbers had dwindled almost to zero. In the United Kingdom the same as other common law nations the law requires that people use "proportionate force" as appropriate to the situation. All violent crimes are reported to the police; only in extreme cases are interventions employed that lead to citizens' arrests (which are legal in Britain) or to the use of force. Guardian Angels in the UK are unarmed but all fully trained in self-defense, first aid, and law for personal and community protection.

The London chapter seemed to be dormant for several years.

== Controversies ==
In the early 1990s, the Guardian Angels was involved in a public controversy with American rapper Ice Cube following the release of his 1991 album Death Certificate. The group criticized the album’s lyrical content, arguing that certain songs promoted racial hostility and social division, and publicly condemned Ice Cube’s work in statements to the media. The Guardian Angels urged broadcasters, including MTV, to reconsider airing Ice Cube’s music videos. Ice Cube later responded to the criticism in his work, including a reference to the group on the track "Dirty Mack" from his third studio album, The Predator (1992), in which he made a dismissive lyrical remark about the organization.

In 1992, Guardian Angels founder Curtis Sliwa issued a public apology for faking several subway rescues during the 1980s to gain publicity for the group.

In October 2020, several people running for the New York City Council expressed concerns that the presence of the Guardian Angels might bring tension to their neighborhoods.

In February 2021, Patrick Bobilin, a candidate for the New York State Assembly, posted a video to Twitter showing members of the Guardian Angels allegedly harassing and attacking protesters (including Bobilin), as they returned from a protest at the Stonewall Inn.

In February 2024, several members of the Guardian Angels shoved a man to the sidewalk and put him in a headlock during a live interview with Sliwa at Times Square in New York City. During the interview—which came a week after a widely publicized brawl between several migrants and New York City Police Department officers—Sliwa stated that the man was a migrant. He also stated that the man had been caught shoplifting. In a later segment of the interview, Sliwa added, "[...] Let's just say we gave him a little pain compliance, his mother back in Venezuela felt the vibrations. He's sucking concrete, the cops scraped him off the asphalt [...]" The NYPD later said that the man was actually from the city's Bronx borough, and they provided no evidence of the man shoplifting. Sliwa told the Associated Press that he believed the man was a migrant because he spoke Spanish and had been encountered with other Spanish speakers during patrols. The police issued the man a summons for disorderly conduct.

== See also ==
- City Angels – Italian volunteer organization
- Lisa Evers – American general assignment reporter (born 1958)
- Public transport security – Public safety measures in mass transit
