= Śliwa =

Śliwa or Sliwa is a Polish surname.

- Bogdan Śliwa (1922–2003), Polish chess master
- Curtis Sliwa (born 1954), American anti-crime activist
- Czesław Śliwa (1932–1971), Polish con artist, forger and a fake Austrian consul
- Izabela Sliwa (born 1990), Polish volleyball player
- Lisa Sliwa, the former name of Lisa Evers (born 1953), American journalist and ex-wife of Curtis Sliwa
- Lucyna Śliwa (born 1964), Polish mycologist and lichenologist
- Magdalena Śliwa (born 1969), Polish volleyball player
- Maciej Śliwa (born 2001), Polish footballer
- Stefan Śliwa (1898–1964), Polish footballer
