= Lisa Evers =

American general assignment reporter (born 1958)

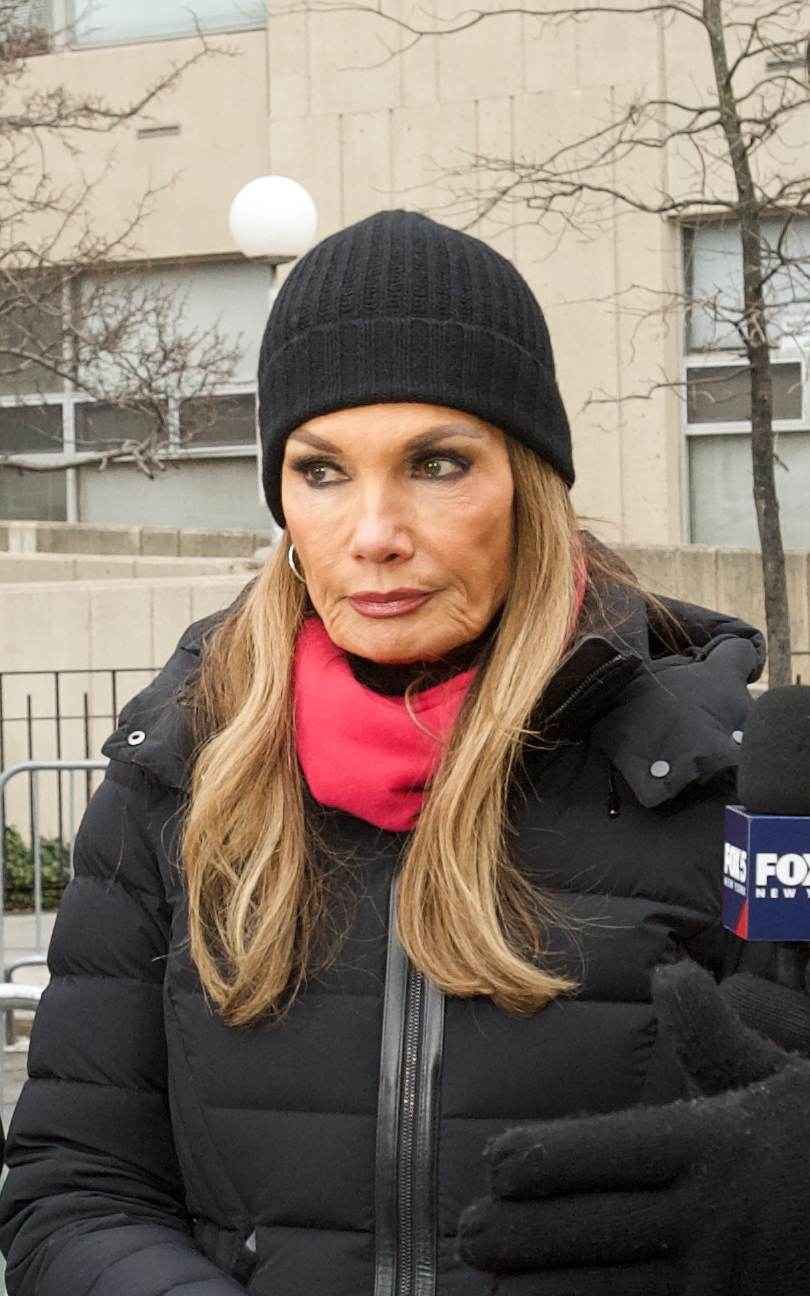
- Evers in 2026, during the arraignment of Nicolás Maduro
- Born: Lisa Evers; June 15, 1953 (age 73); Chicago, Illinois, U.S.
- Education: Lake Forest College (BA)
- Occupations: Journalist; radio personality
- Spouse: Curtis Sliwa (m. 1981; div. 1995)

Lisa Evers (formerly Lisa Sliwa) (born June 15, 1953) is an American general assignment reporter for FOX 5 News, host of the Street Soldiers with Lisa Evers television and radio show in New York City, a former high-ranking Guardian Angel, and a long-time community volunteer for urban, youth and children's charities.

== Early life and education ==
Evers grew up in Hinsdale, Illinois.

In 1978, Evers began attending Lake Forest College, where she earned a Bachelor of Arts in Economics, with a minor in 17th-century French literature.

== Career ==
=== Modeling ===
Evers was discovered by a fashion photographer who saw her on the subway and took some test shots, which led her to a modeling contract with Elite Model Management in the 1980s. With Elite, she worked in New York and Paris, and appeared in a variety of magazines around the world, including French editions of Elle and Vogue, as well as magazines in Australia, India, and the UK.

=== Guardian Angels ===
Evers was once vice-president of the Guardian Angels, a volunteer crime-fighting organization. At that time she was married to its founder, Curtis Sliwa; was known as Lisa Sliwa; and worked as a model with Elite Model Management in New York City and Paris. With Sliwa, she co-hosted a talk radio show on WABC-AM in New York City that ended shortly before their divorce.

In 1983, Evers was beaten up by three men, in their 20's and 30's, in her Manhattan office. According to her then-husband, the men pinned her arms and punched her in the stomach. They also attempted to rape her, but were unsuccessful, fleeing after she punched one in the groin.

As a Guardian Angel, Evers was also arrested during her patrols, and once was charged for disturbing the peace and obstructing justice, after refusing to obey a police officer's commands to leave a subway car.

=== Martial Arts and Wrestling ===
Evers holds a black belt in karate and has been featured in self-defense videos for women. In 1987, she was the first woman to be inducted into the Black Belt Hall of Fame as "Woman of the Year". Additionally, she authored several monthly columns in Black Belt magazine between 1986 and 1994.

In the 1980s, Evers briefly attempted to become a professional wrestler and joined the World Wrestling Federation. She appeared on Tuesday Night Titans in 1985 and demonstrated several self-defense holds.

Evers once trained with The Fabulous Moolah.

=== Journalism ===
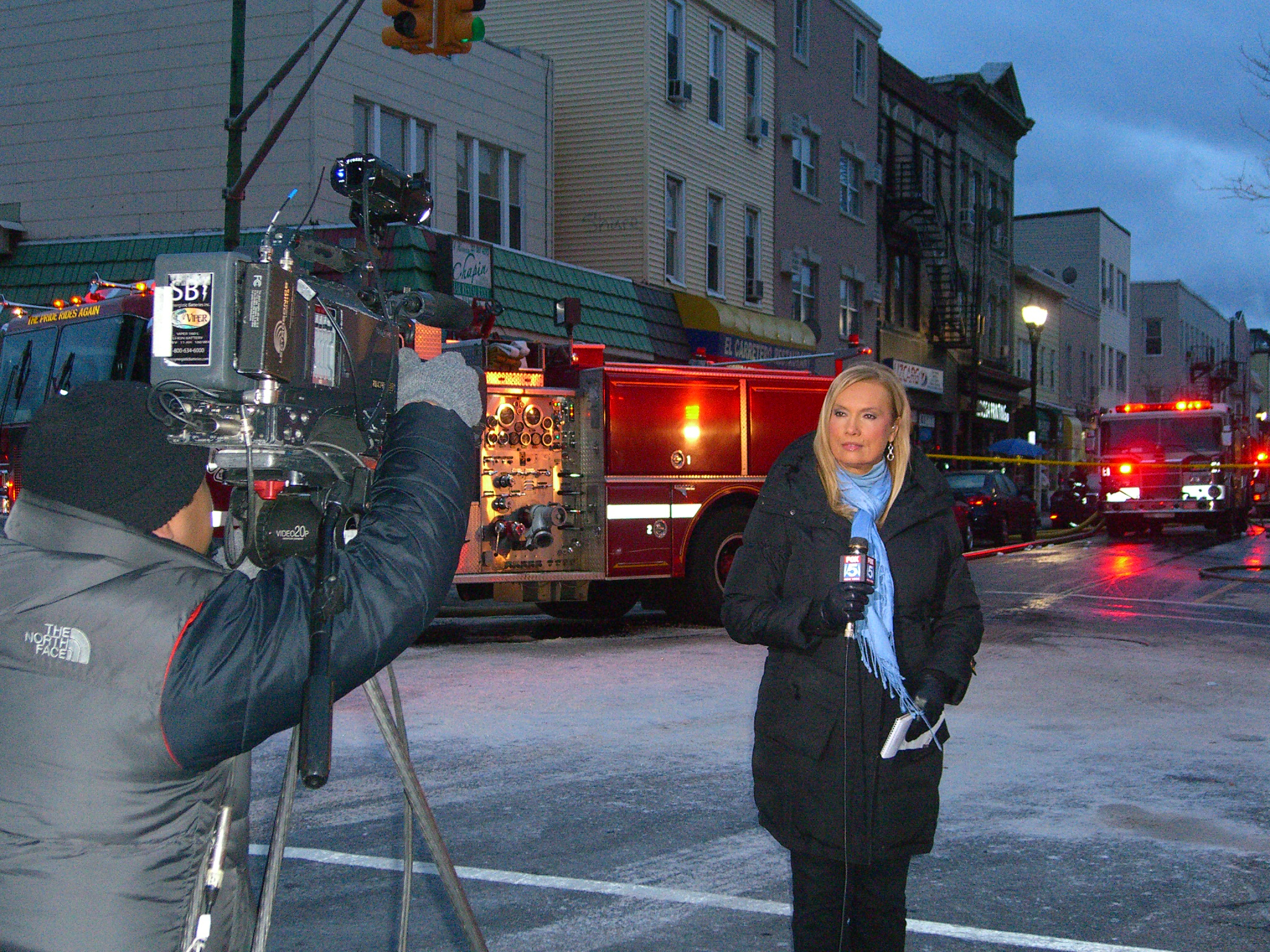
Evers reporting on a January 2012 fire in Union City, New Jersey.

In 2016, the long-running HOT 97 show Street Soldiers with Lisa Evers was turned into a weekly TV show on FOX 5 in New York, airing Friday nights at 10:30 pm. Her list of exclusive one-on-one interviews with big-name hip hop celebrities continues to grow, from 50 Cent's first television interview (FOX 5 News, 2003) to Diddy, Jay-Z, DMX, Fetty Wap, and many more.

She began at WINS as a freelance reporter, and she also worked for CNN Radio Network and the ABC Radio Network.

== Personal life ==
Evers married her former husband, Curtis Sliwa, on Christmas Eve 1981. They later divorced.

=== Charitable work ===
With the support of FOX 5 and HOT 97, Evers led a drive that brought a truckload of new clothes, sneakers, and toys to survivors of Hurricane Katrina. More recently, along with the Hip Hop Has Heart Foundation, she helped organize a major relief effort in the Rockaways, following Super Storm Sandy.

== Published works ==
Bibliography

- Attitude, Crown Publishers. (1980's)

Videography

- Lisa Sliwa's Common-Sense Defense (1980's)
