= City Angels =

Italian volunteer organization

- Formation: 7 September 1994
- Founder: Mario Furlan
- Type: Volunteer association
- Headquarters: Milan, Italy
- Region served: Italy and Switzerland
- Website: cityangels.it

City Angels is an Italian volunteer association based in Milan. It was founded in 1994 by the journalist and university lecturer Mario Furlan.

== History ==
City Angels was founded on 7 September 1994 in Milan as a secular, multi-ethnic, gay-friendly and anti-racist group of volunteers inspired by the Guardian Angels of New York City, but conceived to combine public safety with humanitarian aid. The first team worked with a homeless shelter run by Camillian priest Ettore Boschini near Milano Centrale railway station. After several months of grassroots activity, City Angels were formally inaugurated on 8 February 1995 in the Church of the Carmine, in the Brera district.

In 2007, City Angels opened Casa Silvana, a municipal night shelter named after a murdered homeless woman and inaugurated by then-mayor Letizia Moratti. The municipality later entrusted them with additional hostels; by 2014 they managed three facilities (≈400 beds) and in 2016 opened a 130-bed shelter in Niguarda named "Elio Fiorucci" after the designer who created the group’s logo.

In 2017, City Angels launched the Oasi del clochard (Homeless Oasis), a cluster of prefabricated houses on the site of a former Roma camp; it closed in 2019 when the land lease was not renewed. Since 2020 the association has managed accommodation in Monza, Varese and, since 2023, Sondrio.

During the COVID-19 pandemic in Italy (March–May 2020) volunteers distributed food, medicines, masks and sanitiser to older people, people with disabilities and the homeless in every city where they operate, and kept soup kitchens and public showers open in Rome, Bergamo and Monza when other operators closed.

After the outbreak of the war in Ukraine (2022), chapters in Rome, Milan, Bergamo, Voghera, Monza, Parma and Campomarino coordinated the collection and shipment of essential supplies to the conflict zone.

As of 2024, City Angels is present in 20 Italian cities and two Swiss ones.

== Volunteers ==
City Angels are private citizens who assist people in social or economic exclusion (homeless people, substance users, sex workers, migrants, older adults, people with disabilities, crime victims, prisoners and abandoned animals). Many volunteers combine daytime jobs or studies with night-time or weekend patrols.

Their unarmed uniform consists of black trousers and shoes, a red jacket or T-shirt and a blue beret modelled on the UN peacekeepers’ headgear.

== Training ==
Applicants must pass a psycho-aptitude test and complete a 20-hour course covering first aid, criminal law, psychology, communication and addictions. They also learn Wilding, a self-defence system developed by Furlan.

== Emblem ==
Designer Elio Fiorucci created the logo, which shows an eagle with outstretched wings protecting a city skyline; the image is topped by the words "City Angels" and the motto "Solidarietà e Sicurezza".

== Maroni decree ==
In early 2009 the Interior Minister Roberto Maroni promoted a "security decree" authorising unarmed citizen patrols. City Angels were often cited as a successful example in cities such as Milan, and several mayors (Rome, Turin) said they preferred cooperating with them rather than creating new patrols. The association did not register under the decree, as Furlan argued that its members are social workers, not security patrols.

== Operations ==
=== Italy ===
City Angels are active in Milan, Rome, Turin, Monza, Parma, Brescia, Bergamo, Voghera, Ancona, Sondrio, Novara, Como, Varese, Campomarino, Lecco, Palermo, Genoa, Busto Arsizio, Gallarate and Saronno.

=== Switzerland ===
The Swiss chapter has been based in Lugano since 2014 and, since 2018, also in Chiasso, where it cooperates with the border police.

== Awards and prizes ==
The City Angels have received several awards in their history by the institutions. Among these the most important are:

- 1999: "Ambrogino d'Oro", the most important recognition in the City of Milan
- 2000: Motta Goodness Award
- 2007: Paul Harris Award of the Rotary Club International to Mario Furlan, founder of City Angels
- 2008: "Ambrogino d'Oro" (to the honorary City Angel Eddy Gardner)
- 2008: Ambassador for Peace Award of the World Peace Organisation
- 2009: The Gift of Humanity Award
- 2013: Carlo Porta Award
- 2018: Gold medal of the City of Bergamo
- 2019: "Bronzi di Riace" award to Mario Furlan, founder of City Angels
- 2024: "Cavaliere al merito" award to Mario Furlan, founder of City Angels
