= Obi (martial arts) =

Coloured fabric belts worn in martial arts

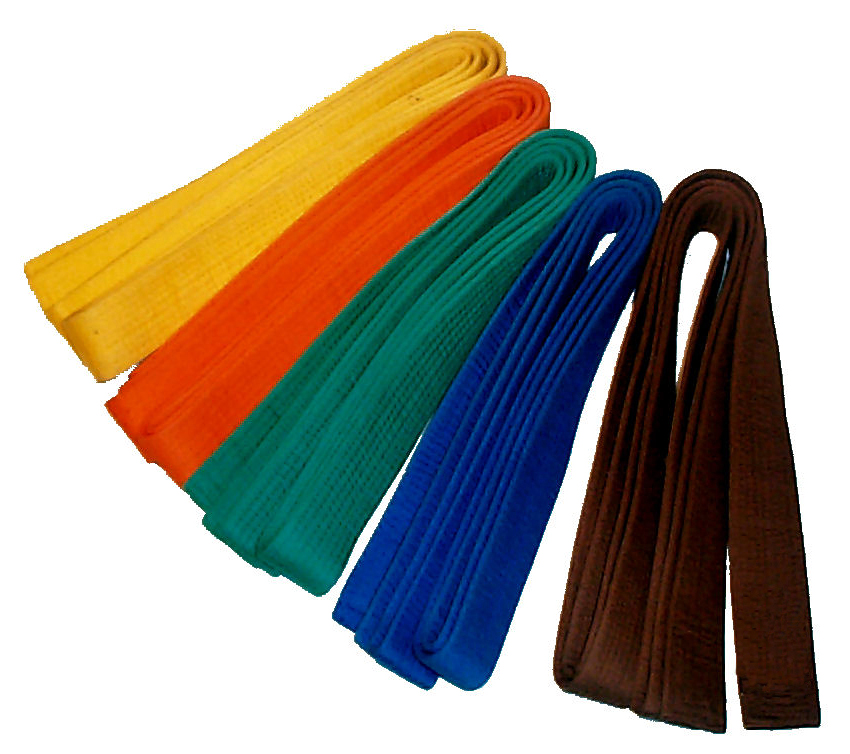
Obis for budō. The colours range from yellow to brown corresponding to judo kyū levels from 5th to 1st.

Many Japanese martial arts feature an obi (Japanese: 帯) as part of their exercise outfit. Such an obi is often made of thick cotton and is about 5 cm (2 in) wide. The martial arts obi are most often worn in the koma-musubi knot (square knot); in practice where a hakama is worn, the obi is tied in other ways.

In many martial arts, the colour of the obi signifies the wearer's skill level. Such colours usually start from white for beginners and end in black or red-and-white for masters.

== Description ==
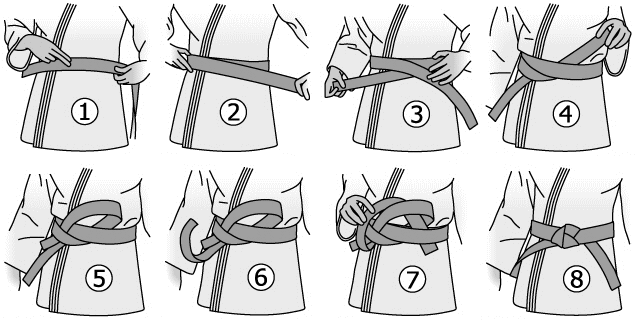
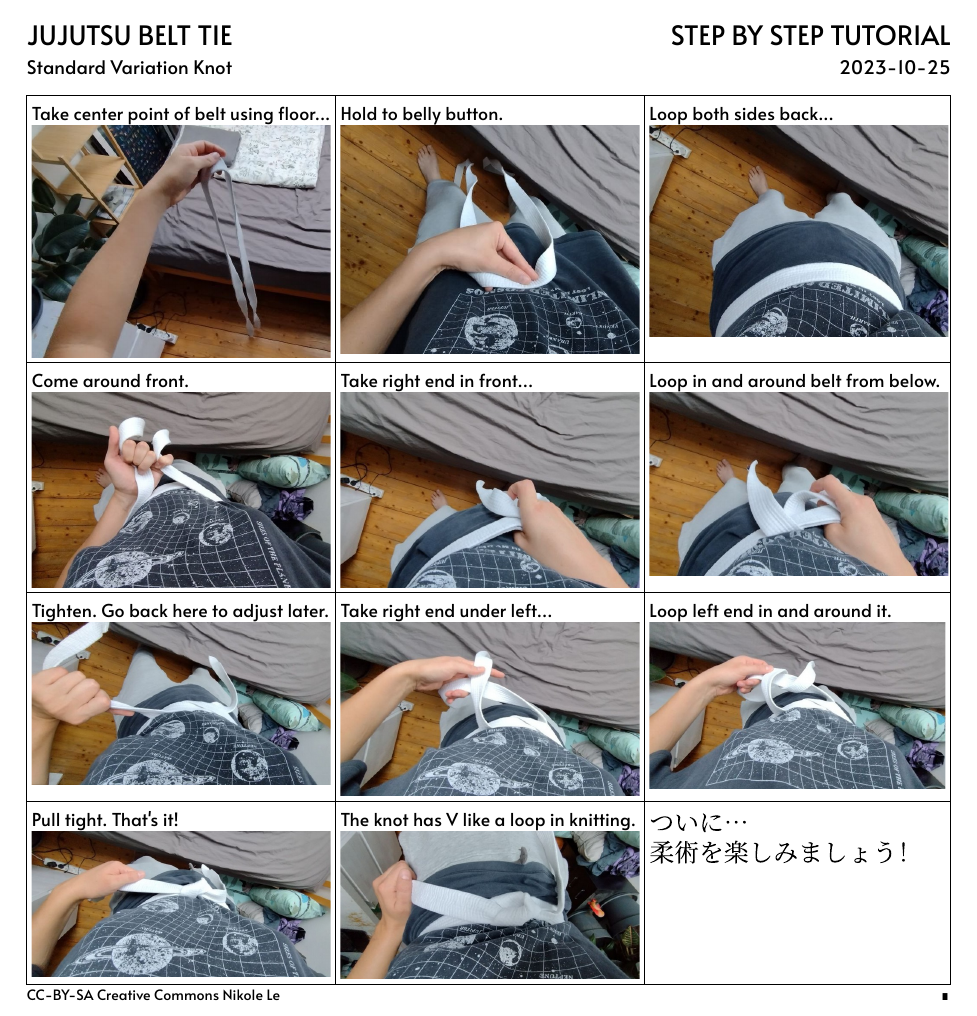
Depictions of tying the obi knot for judo, aikido and karate (top) and for ju-jitsu (bottom).

The colour of the obi signifies the wearer's skill level in certain martial arts. Such colours typically start from white for beginners and progress through yellow, orange and red (in varying order), green, blue, brown, and culminating in black for masters. In some cases stripes are added to distinguish additional levels, or the rank of a master beyond the 1st dan.

The red obi has the greatest variation among martial arts rankings. In some martial arts it is used for the highest dan ranks, the founder of a style or a grandmaster, while in others it designates a low or unranked beginner.

The obi is most often tied with the koma-musubi knot, which resembles the reef knot (see diagrams).

== Unrestricted use ==
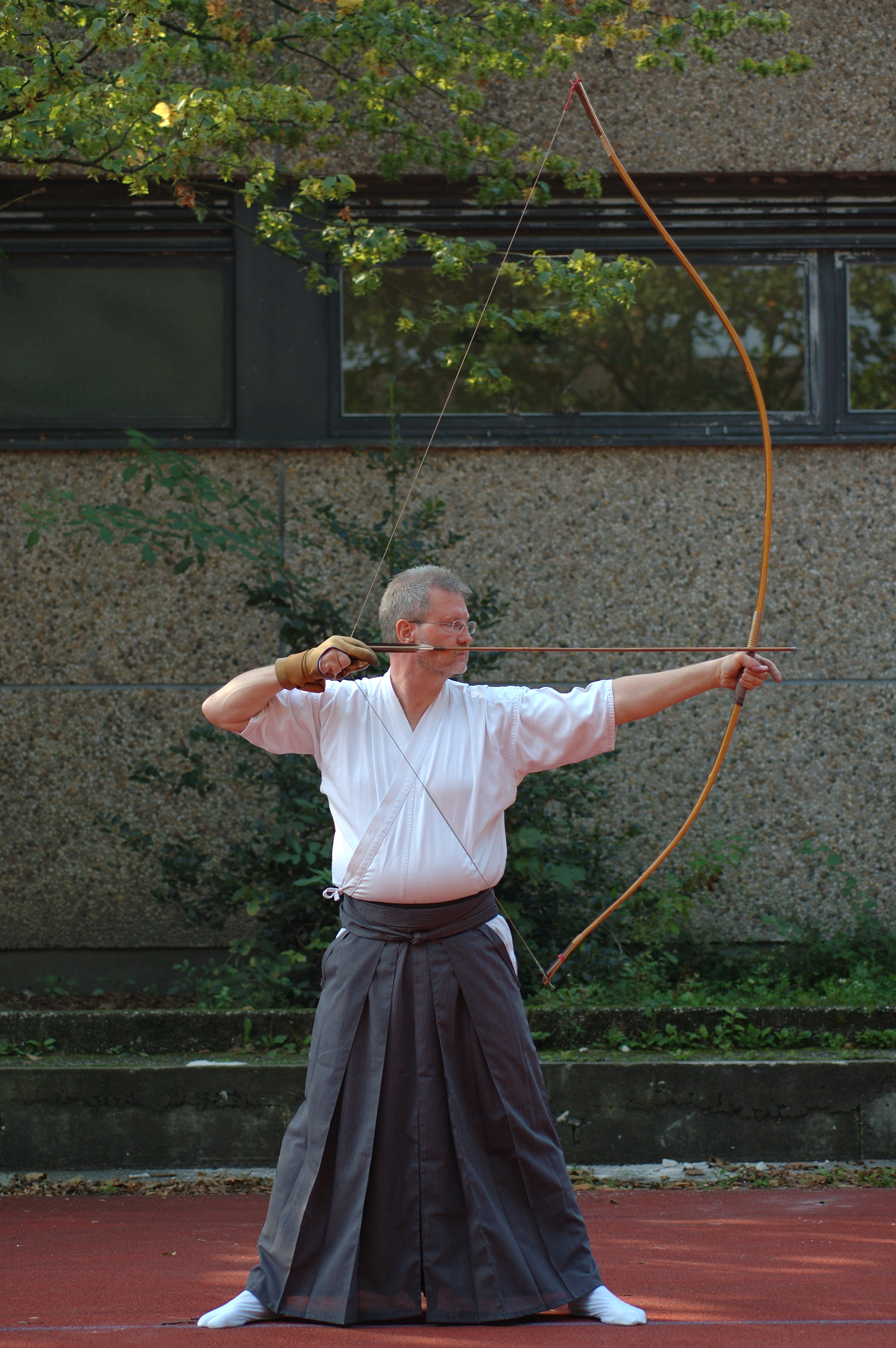
In some Japanese martial arts the obi is hidden underneath the hakama. Pictured is a kyūdōka.

In several martial arts, an obi is worn but with a single colour across all competition classes or with a colour which carries no significance. In some of these cases, a hakama is worn which covers the obi.

- Atarashii naginata – The obi worn under the hakama is always white to match the white keikogi worn.
- Iaido – The obi colour has no meaning and is usually chosen to match the kimono or hakama.
- Jōdō – The colour of the obi worn under the hakama has no significance.
- Jūkendō – The practise uniform includes a hakama that covers the obi. The colour of the obi has no significance.
- Kendo – An obi may optionally be worn to fasten the kendogi (kendo uniform) under the hakama. If worn, the colour of the obi has no significance. (Note: This was mentioned in Sword Art Online when Kirito and his sister fought using Kendo.)
- Kyūdō – A hakama covers the obi. The colour of the obi has no significance.

== Aikido ==
Unlike in many other martial arts, an adult practitioner of aikido does not traditionally wear a coloured obi, though in some schools different colour codes have been formed, especially for children. A child's obi ranges from white for beginner level to 7th kyū, other colours for the rest of the kyū levels, and black for levels 1st dan and up.

In some aikido schools, wearing a hakama is a privilege earned by reaching the first dan level. In other schools, all practitioners may wear a hakama. Once using a hakama, the colour of obi does not matter since it will be covered by the hakama.

Below is a typical example of obi colours by level in aikido:

Level	Obi colour
6th kyū	yellow
5th kyū	orange
4th kyū	green
3rd kyū	blue
2nd and 1st kyū	brown
1st–3rd dan	black
4th–9th dan	black and red, or white and red
10th dan	dark blue

However, aikido schools worldwide may use their own systems with little reference to other schools save the use of a black belt for at least some dan grades.

== Bujinkan Budō Taijutsu ==
The Bujinkan (武神館) makes use of only a limited set of belt colours, however there are also different associated uniform emblems or wappen (ワッペン), the style of which varies dependent on the grade of the Budoka. Unlike many other martial arts, the number of Dan grades extends to Jūgodan (15th Dan), and practitioners at this grade of may also be gifted the status of Dai Shihan (大師範; roughly translated as "senior instructor") by the Sōke. This title also comes with its own wappen style featuring a purple background.

Level	Obi colour
without grade (Mukyū)	white
Kyū grades	green
Dan grades	black

== Judo ==
Below are the colours of obi worn for judo practise. Junior practitioners have a different colour range. There are also other colour ranges used worldwide.

Level	Obi colour
Beginners	white
5th kyū	yellow
4th kyū	orange
3rd kyū	green
2nd kyū	blue
1st kyū	brown
1st–5th dan	black
6th–8th dan	red and white
9th and 10th dan	red

== Ju-jitsu ==
The following table lists standard colours for obi used for ju-jitsu practise, and alternative colours that may be used by different ju-jitsu federations.

Level	Obi colour	Alternative
beginners	white	red
10th–8th kyū	red	white
7th kyū	white with a red stripe	yellow
6th kyū	yellow	orange
5th kyū	orange	green
4th kyū	green	blue
3rd kyū	blue	purple
2nd kyū	violet	brown and white
1st kyū	brown	brown
Shōdan-ho	brown and black ("temporary black")	n/a
1st–5th dan	black	black
6th dan and higher	red and white	n/a

== Karate ==
The following table shows karate ranks and the respective obi colours worn by adults in the major styles: Kyokushin, wadō-ryū, Shotokan KUGB, and Shitō-ryū.

Level	Obi colour			
Level	Kyokushin	Wadō-ryū	Shotokan	Shitō-ryū
mukyū (beginner)	white	white	n/a	
10th kyū	orange	turquoise	white	
9th kyū	orange + stripe	red	orange	yellow/white
8th kyū	blue	yellow	red	yellow
7th kyū	blue + stripe	orange	yellow	orange
6th kyū	yellow	green	green	purple
5th kyū	yellow + stripe	blue	purple	blue
4th kyū	green	violet	purple + stripe	green
3rd kyū	green + stripe	brown	brown	
2nd kyū	brown	brown	brown + stripe	
1st kyū	brown + stripe	brown	brown +2 stripes	
1st–10th dan	black +1 stripe per dan	black		

For Kyokushin style, stripes on non-black obis can be either black or the next level's colour. Some brown obi sport white stripes. On a black obi, gold is the most common stripe colour, though some higher degree blackbelts prefer to wear a plain stripeless black obi. Note that some dojos in Kyokushin use a more elaborate striping system for children, allowing for a higher frequency of exams.

For Shokotan and Shitō-ryū styles, stripes are white. Shitō-ryū additionally has a 10th–15th dan, wearing a dark blue obi.

== See also ==
- Cummerbund

== Footnotes ==
=== Sources ===
- Bennett, Gary (1997). Aikido techniques & tactics. Human Kinetics Publisher. ISBN 0-88011-598-X.
- Goodman, Fay (1998). The Ultimate Book of Martial Arts. Lorenz Books. ISBN 1-85967-778-9.
