= List of borough presidents of New York City =

Current borough presidents

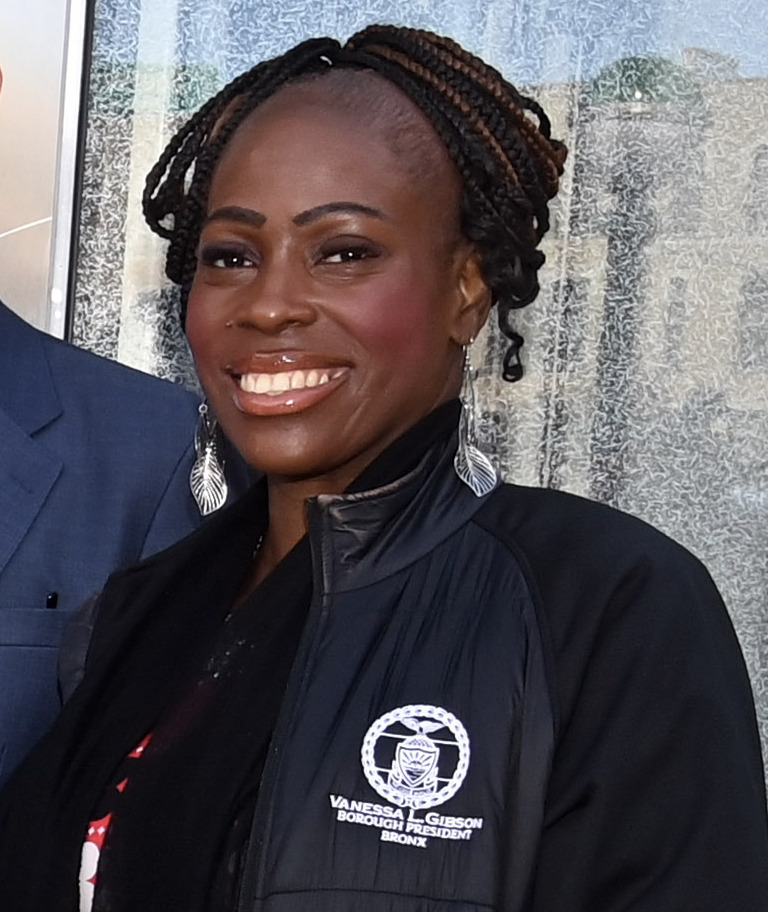
Vanessa Gibson
(The Bronx)
(since 2022)

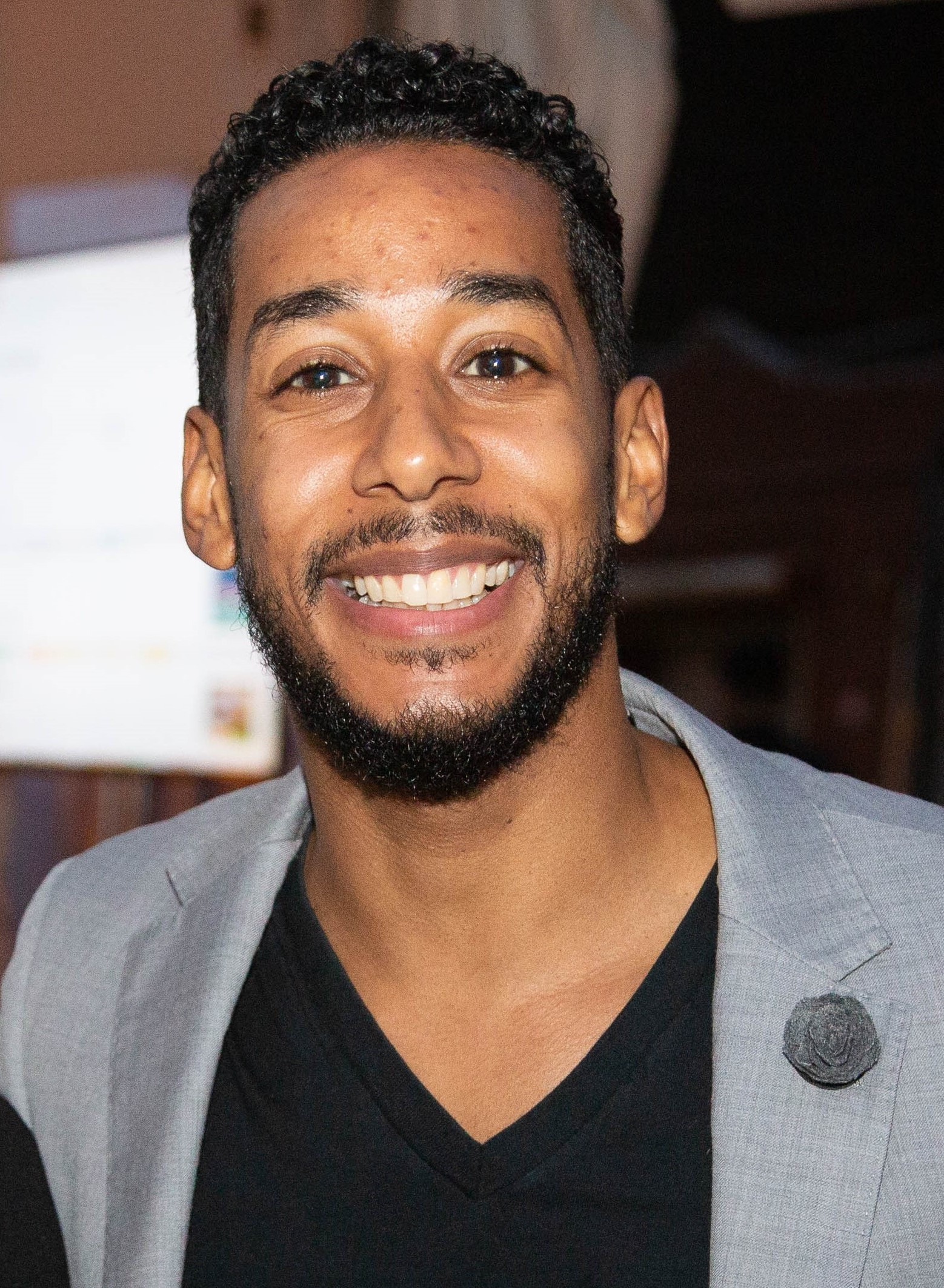
Antonio Reynoso
(Brooklyn)
(since 2022)

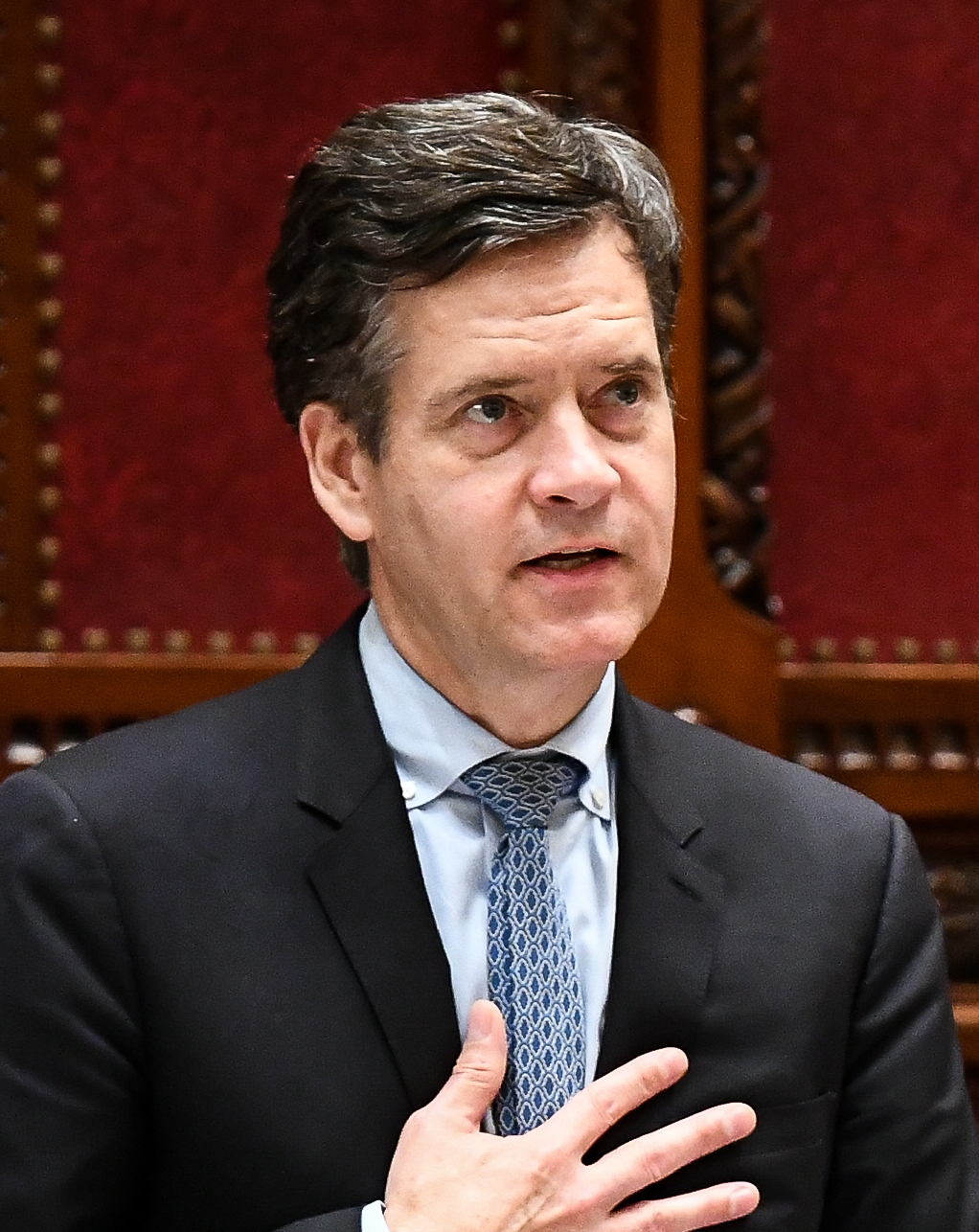
Brad Hoylman-Sigal
(Manhattan)
(since 2026)

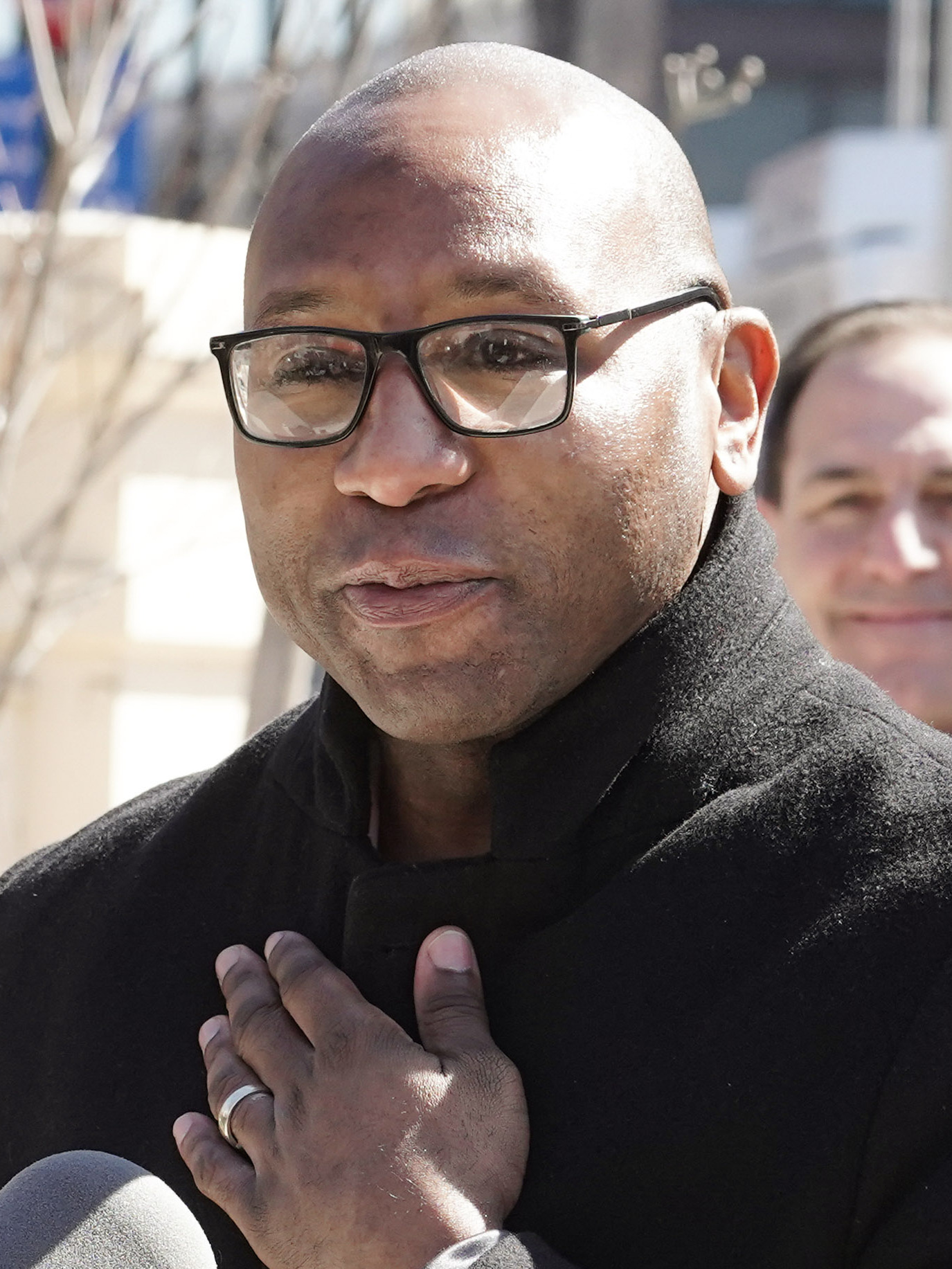
Donovan Richards
(Queens)
(since 2020)

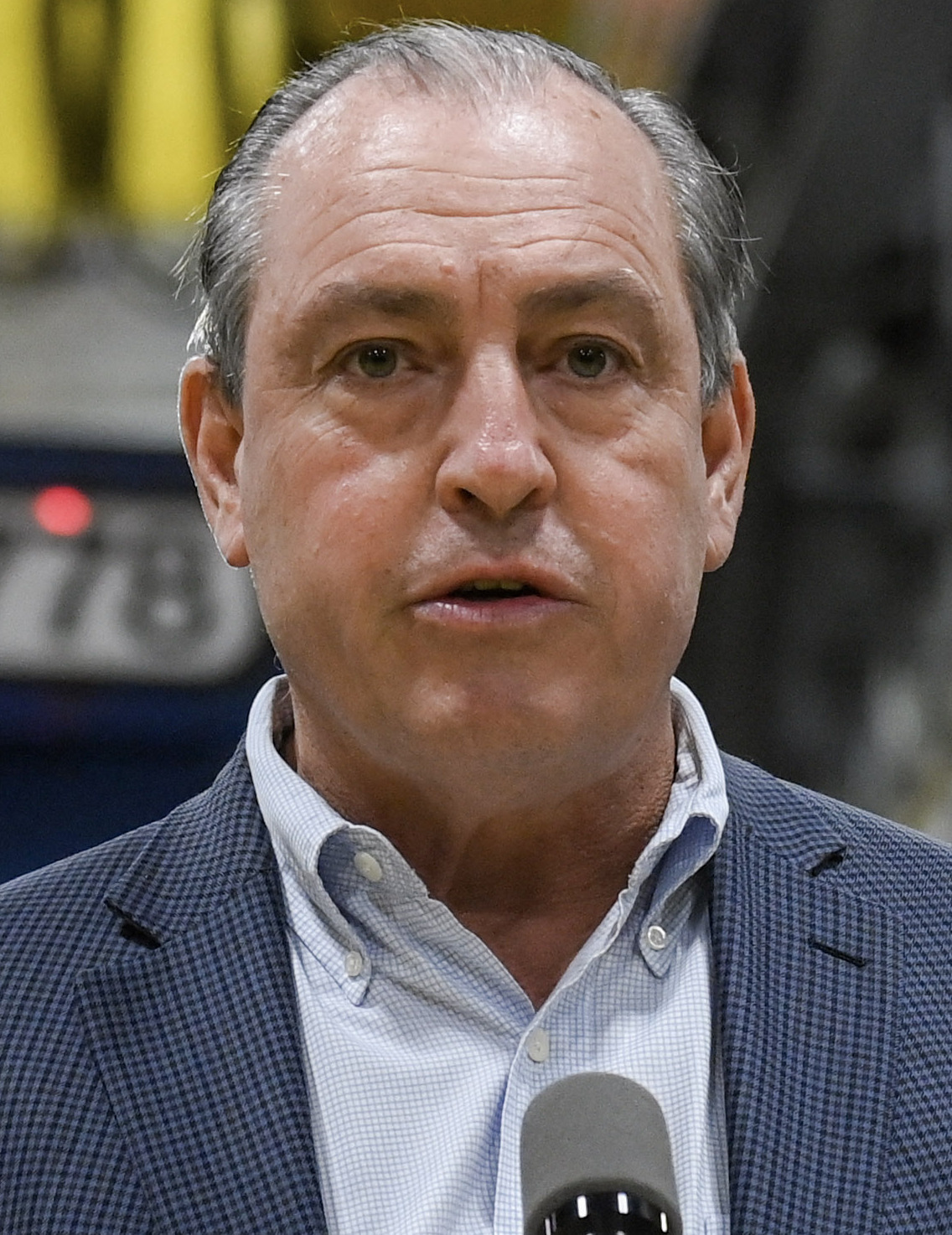
Vito Fossella
(Staten Island)
(since 2022)

The following is a list of borough presidents of the five boroughs of New York City.

== The Bronx borough presidents ==
No.	Borough President		Took office	Left office	Tenure	Election	Party
1	Portrait of Louis F. Haffen	Louis F. Haffen (1854–1935)	January 1, 1898	August 29, 1909 (Note: Haffen was removed by Governor Charles Evans Hughes for misconduct in office and neglect of duty.)	11 years, 240 days	1897	Democratic
1	Portrait of Louis F. Haffen	Louis F. Haffen (1854–1935)	January 1, 1898	August 29, 1909	11 years, 240 days	1901	Democratic
1	Portrait of Louis F. Haffen	Louis F. Haffen (1854–1935)	January 1, 1898	August 29, 1909	11 years, 240 days	1903	Democratic
1	Portrait of Louis F. Haffen	Louis F. Haffen (1854–1935)	January 1, 1898	August 29, 1909	11 years, 240 days	1905	Democratic
–		John F. Murray (1862–1928); Acting, then interim	August 29, 1909	September 9, 1909	11 days	–	Democratic
2		John F. Murray (1862–1928); Acting, then interim	September 9, 1909	December 31, 1909	113 days	App.	Democratic
3	Portrait of Cyrus C. Miller	Cyrus C. Miller (1866–1956)	January 1, 1910	December 31, 1913	3 years, 364 days	1909	Democratic
4	Portrait of Douglas Mathewson	Douglas Mathewson (1870–1948)	January 1, 1914	December 31, 1917 (Note: Mathewson ran successfully for a City Court judge position.)	3 years, 364 days	1913	Fusion (Republican)
5	Portrait of Henry Bruckner	Henry Bruckner (1871–1942)	January 1, 1918	December 31, 1933	15 years, 364 days	1917	Democratic
5	Portrait of Henry Bruckner	Henry Bruckner (1871–1942)	January 1, 1918	December 31, 1933	15 years, 364 days	1921	Democratic
5	Portrait of Henry Bruckner	Henry Bruckner (1871–1942)	January 1, 1918	December 31, 1933	15 years, 364 days	1925	Democratic
5	Portrait of Henry Bruckner	Henry Bruckner (1871–1942)	January 1, 1918	December 31, 1933	15 years, 364 days	1929	Democratic
6	Portrait of James J. Lyons	James J. Lyons (1890–1966)	January 1, 1934	January 2, 1962	28 years, 1 day	1933	Democratic
6	Portrait of James J. Lyons	James J. Lyons (1890–1966)	January 1, 1934	January 2, 1962	28 years, 1 day	1937	Democratic
6	Portrait of James J. Lyons	James J. Lyons (1890–1966)	January 1, 1934	January 2, 1962	28 years, 1 day	1941	Democratic
6	Portrait of James J. Lyons	James J. Lyons (1890–1966)	January 1, 1934	January 2, 1962	28 years, 1 day	1945	Democratic
6	Portrait of James J. Lyons	James J. Lyons (1890–1966)	January 1, 1934	January 2, 1962	28 years, 1 day	1949	Democratic
6	Portrait of James J. Lyons	James J. Lyons (1890–1966)	January 1, 1934	January 2, 1962	28 years, 1 day	1953	Democratic
6	Portrait of James J. Lyons	James J. Lyons (1890–1966)	January 1, 1934	January 2, 1962	28 years, 1 day	1957	Democratic
7	Portrait of Joseph F. Periconi	Joseph F. Periconi (1910–1994)	January 2, 1962	December 28, 1965	3 years, 360 days	1961	Republican (Note: Periconi was also nominated and endorsed by the Liberal and Brotherhood parties for borough president.)
8	Portrait of Herman Badillo	Herman Badillo (1929–2014)	December 28, 1965	December 31, 1969 (Note: Badillo ran unsuccessfully for Mayor of New York City.)	4 years, 3 days	1965	Democratic
9	Portrait of Robert Abrams	Robert Abrams (born 1938)	January 1, 1970	December 31, 1978 (Note: Abrams resigned to become New York Attorney General.)	8 years, 364 days	1969	Democratic
9	Portrait of Robert Abrams	Robert Abrams (born 1938)	January 1, 1970	December 31, 1978	8 years, 364 days	1973	Democratic
9	Portrait of Robert Abrams	Robert Abrams (born 1938)	January 1, 1970	December 31, 1978	8 years, 364 days	1977	Democratic
Vacant			January 1, 1979	January 5, 1979			
10		Stanley Simon (1930–2023)	January 5, 1979	March 11, 1987 (Note: Simon resigned prior to being indicted in the Wedtech scandal.)	8 years, 65 days	App.	Democratic
10		Stanley Simon (1930–2023)	January 5, 1979	March 11, 1987	8 years, 65 days	1981	Democratic
10		Stanley Simon (1930–2023)	January 5, 1979	March 11, 1987	8 years, 65 days	1985	Democratic
–		Cecil P. Joseph (TBA–TBA); Acting	March 11, 1987	April 15, 1987	35 days	–	Democratic
11	Portrait of Fernando Ferrer	Fernando Ferrer (born 1950)	April 15, 1987	December 31, 2001	14 years, 260 days	App.	Democratic
11	Portrait of Fernando Ferrer	Fernando Ferrer (born 1950)	April 15, 1987	December 31, 2001	14 years, 260 days	1989	Democratic
11	Portrait of Fernando Ferrer	Fernando Ferrer (born 1950)	April 15, 1987	December 31, 2001	14 years, 260 days	1993	Democratic
11	Portrait of Fernando Ferrer	Fernando Ferrer (born 1950)	April 15, 1987	December 31, 2001	14 years, 260 days	1997	Democratic
12	Portrait of Adolfo Carrión Jr.	Adolfo Carrión Jr. (born 1961)	January 1, 2002	February 19, 2009 (Note: Carrión resigned to become Director of the White House Office of Urban Affairs.)	7 years, 49 days	2001	Democratic
12	Portrait of Adolfo Carrión Jr.	Adolfo Carrión Jr. (born 1961)	January 1, 2002	February 19, 2009	7 years, 49 days	2005	Democratic
–		Earl D. Brown (TBA–TBA); Acting	February 19, 2009	May 21, 2009	91 days	–	Democratic
13	Portrait of Rubén Díaz Jr.	Rubén Díaz Jr. (born 1973)	May 21, 2009	December 31, 2021	12 years, 224 days	2009 special	Democratic
13	Portrait of Rubén Díaz Jr.	Rubén Díaz Jr. (born 1973)	May 21, 2009	December 31, 2021	12 years, 224 days	2009	Democratic
13	Portrait of Rubén Díaz Jr.	Rubén Díaz Jr. (born 1973)	May 21, 2009	December 31, 2021	12 years, 224 days	2013	Democratic
13	Portrait of Rubén Díaz Jr.	Rubén Díaz Jr. (born 1973)	May 21, 2009	December 31, 2021	12 years, 224 days	2017	Democratic
14	Portrait of Vanessa Gibson	Vanessa Gibson (born 1979)	January 1, 2022	Incumbent (Note: Gibson's second term began on January 1, 2026, and is set to expire on December 31, 2029; she will be term-limited.)	4 years, 324 days	2021	Democratic
14	Portrait of Vanessa Gibson	Vanessa Gibson (born 1979)	January 1, 2022	Incumbent	4 years, 324 days	2025	Democratic

== Brooklyn borough presidents ==
No.	Borough President		Took office	Left office	Tenure	Election	Party
1	Portrait of Edward M. Grout	Edward M. Grout (1861–1931)	January 1, 1898	December 31, 1901	3 years, 364 days	1897	Democratic
2	Portrait of J. Edward Swanstrom	J. Edward Swanstrom (1853–1911)	January 1, 1902	December 31, 1903	1 year, 364 days	1901	Fusion (Republican)
3	Portrait of Martin W. Littleton	Martin W. Littleton (1872–1934)	January 1, 1904	December 31, 1905	1 year, 364 days	1903	Democratic-Independent
4	Portrait of Bird Sim Coler	Bird Sim Coler (1867–1941)	January 1, 1906	December 31, 1909	3 years, 364 days	1905	Municipal Ownership League
5		Alfred E. Steers (1860–1948)	January 1, 1910	December 31, 1913	3 years, 364 days	1909	Democratic-Independent
6	Portrait of Lewis H. Pounds	Lewis H. Pounds (1860–1947)	January 1, 1914	December 31, 1917	3 years, 364 days	1913	Fusion (Republican)
7		Edward J. Riegelmann (1869–1941)	January 1, 1918	December 31, 1924 (Note: Riegelmann resigned to become a justice of the New York State Supreme Court.)	6 years, 365 days	1917	Democratic
7		Edward J. Riegelmann (1869–1941)	January 1, 1918	December 31, 1924	6 years, 365 days	1921	Democratic
8		Joseph A. Guider (1870–1926)	January 1, 1925	September 22, 1926 (Note: Died in office)	1 year, 264 days	App.	Democratic
8		Joseph A. Guider (1870–1926)	January 1, 1925	September 22, 1926	1 year, 264 days	1925	Democratic
–		James J. Byrne (1863–1930)	September 22, 1926	September 30, 1926	8 days	–	Democratic
9		James J. Byrne (1863–1930)	September 30, 1926	March 14, 1930	3 years, 165 days	App.	Democratic
9		James J. Byrne (1863–1930)	September 30, 1926	March 14, 1930	3 years, 165 days	1926 special	Democratic
9		James J. Byrne (1863–1930)	September 30, 1926	March 14, 1930	3 years, 165 days	1929	Democratic
–		Henry Hesterberg (1881–1950); Interim	March 14, 1930	April 2, 1930	19 days	–	Democratic
10		Henry Hesterberg (1881–1950); Interim	April 2, 1930	December 11, 1933 (Note: Hesterberg lost the 1933 election, then resigned two weeks before the end of his term to accept a position on the City Water Board.)	3 years, 253 days	App.	Democratic
10		Henry Hesterberg (1881–1950); Interim	April 2, 1930	December 11, 1933	3 years, 253 days	1930 special	Democratic
11		Peter A. Carey (c. 1873–1940); Interim	December 13, 1933	December 31, 1933	18 days	App.	Democratic
12	Portrait of Raymond Ingersoll	Raymond Ingersoll (1875–1940)	January 1, 1934	February 24, 1940	6 years, 54 days	1933	Fusion (Democratic)
12	Portrait of Raymond Ingersoll	Raymond Ingersoll (1875–1940)	January 1, 1934	February 24, 1940	6 years, 54 days	1937	Fusion (Democratic)
–		Arthur R. Ebel (TBA–TBA); Acting	February 24, 1940	March 4, 1940	9 days	–	Democratic
13	Portrait of John Cashmore	John Cashmore (1895–1961)	March 4, 1940	May 7, 1961	21 years, 64 days	App.	Democratic
13	Portrait of John Cashmore	John Cashmore (1895–1961)	March 4, 1940	May 7, 1961	21 years, 64 days	1940 special	Democratic
13	Portrait of John Cashmore	John Cashmore (1895–1961)	March 4, 1940	May 7, 1961	21 years, 64 days	1941	Democratic
13	Portrait of John Cashmore	John Cashmore (1895–1961)	March 4, 1940	May 7, 1961	21 years, 64 days	1945	Democratic
13	Portrait of John Cashmore	John Cashmore (1895–1961)	March 4, 1940	May 7, 1961	21 years, 64 days	1949	Democratic
13	Portrait of John Cashmore	John Cashmore (1895–1961)	March 4, 1940	May 7, 1961	21 years, 64 days	1953	Democratic
13	Portrait of John Cashmore	John Cashmore (1895–1961)	March 4, 1940	May 7, 1961	21 years, 64 days	1957	Democratic
–		John F. Hayes (1915–2001); Interim	May 7, 1961	July 6, 1961	60 days	–	Democratic
14		John F. Hayes (1915–2001); Interim	July 6, 1961	December 31, 1961	178 days	App.	Democratic
15	Portrait of Abe Stark	Abe Stark (1894–1972)	January 1, 1962	September 8, 1970 (Note: Stark resigned due to poor health.)	8 years, 250 days	1961	Democratic
15	Portrait of Abe Stark	Abe Stark (1894–1972)	January 1, 1962	September 8, 1970	8 years, 250 days	1965	Democratic
15	Portrait of Abe Stark	Abe Stark (1894–1972)	January 1, 1962	September 8, 1970	8 years, 250 days	1969	Democratic
16		Sebastian Leone (1924–2016); Interim, then elected	September 9, 1970	December 31, 1970	113 days	App.	Democratic
16		Sebastian Leone (1924–2016); Interim, then elected	January 1, 1971	December 31, 1976 (Note: Leone resigned to become a justice of the New York State Supreme Court.)	5 years, 365 days	1970 special	Democratic
16		Sebastian Leone (1924–2016); Interim, then elected	January 1, 1971	December 31, 1976	5 years, 365 days	1973	Democratic
17	Portrait of Howard Golden	Howard Golden (1925–2024); Interim, then elected	January 3, 1977	December 31, 1977	362 days	App.	Democratic
17	Portrait of Howard Golden	Howard Golden (1925–2024); Interim, then elected	January 1, 1978	December 31, 2001	24 years, 362 days	1977	Democratic
17	Portrait of Howard Golden	Howard Golden (1925–2024); Interim, then elected	January 1, 1978	December 31, 2001	24 years, 362 days	1981	Democratic
17	Portrait of Howard Golden	Howard Golden (1925–2024); Interim, then elected	January 1, 1978	December 31, 2001	24 years, 362 days	1985	Democratic
17	Portrait of Howard Golden	Howard Golden (1925–2024); Interim, then elected	January 1, 1978	December 31, 2001	24 years, 362 days	1989	Democratic
17	Portrait of Howard Golden	Howard Golden (1925–2024); Interim, then elected	January 1, 1978	December 31, 2001	24 years, 362 days	1993	Democratic
17	Portrait of Howard Golden	Howard Golden (1925–2024); Interim, then elected	January 1, 1978	December 31, 2001	24 years, 362 days	1997	Democratic
18	Portrait of Marty Markowitz	Marty Markowitz (born 1945)	January 1, 2002	December 31, 2013	11 years, 364 days	2001	Democratic
18	Portrait of Marty Markowitz	Marty Markowitz (born 1945)	January 1, 2002	December 31, 2013	11 years, 364 days	2005	Democratic
18	Portrait of Marty Markowitz	Marty Markowitz (born 1945)	January 1, 2002	December 31, 2013	11 years, 364 days	2009	Democratic
19	Portrait of Eric Adams	Eric Adams (born 1960)	January 1, 2014	December 31, 2021 (Note: Adams ran successfully for Mayor of New York City.)	7 years, 364 days	2013	Democratic
19	Portrait of Eric Adams	Eric Adams (born 1960)	January 1, 2014	December 31, 2021	7 years, 364 days	2017	Democratic
20	Portrait of Antonio Reynoso	Antonio Reynoso (born 1983)	January 1, 2022	Incumbent (Note: Reynoso's second term began on January 1, 2026, and is set to expire on December 31, 2029; he will be term-limited.)	4 years, 324 days	2021	Democratic
20	Portrait of Antonio Reynoso	Antonio Reynoso (born 1983)	January 1, 2022	Incumbent	4 years, 324 days	2025	Democratic

== Manhattan borough presidents ==
Before 1874, when it annexed part of the Bronx, New York City was the same as the present Borough of Manhattan. For New York's mayors before 1898, see List of mayors of New York City.

No.	Borough President		Took office	Left office	Tenure	Election	Party
1	Portrait of Augustus W. Peters	Augustus W. Peters (1844–1898)	January 1, 1898	December 29, 1898 (Note: Died in office)	362 days	1897	Democratic
Vacant			December 29, 1898	January 5, 1899			
2	Portrait of James J. Coogan	James J. Coogan (1846–1915)	January 5, 1899	December 31, 1901	2 years, 360 days	App.	Democratic
3	Portrait of Jacob A. Cantor	Jacob A. Cantor (1854–1921)	January 1, 1902	December 31, 1903	1 year, 364 days	1901	Fusion (Republican)
4	Portrait of John F. Ahearn	John F. Ahearn (1853–1920)	January 1, 1904	December 29, 1909 (Note: Ahearn was removed by Governor Charles Evans Hughes for failure to perform his duties, but was re-elected as his own replacement by a 24–12 vote of the Manhattan aldermen and managed to stay in office by legal challenges until the Court of Appeals ruled against him near the end of his term.)	5 years, 362 days	1903	Democratic
4	Portrait of John F. Ahearn	John F. Ahearn (1853–1920)	January 1, 1904	December 29, 1909	5 years, 362 days	1905	Democratic
5		John Cloughen (1849–1911); Interim	December 29, 1909	December 31, 1909	2 days	App.	Democratic
6	Portrait of George McAneny	George McAneny (1869–1953)	January 1, 1910	December 31, 1913	3 years, 364 days	1909	Fusion (Democratic)
7	Portrait of Marcus M. Marks	Marcus M. Marks (1858–1934)	January 1, 1914	December 31, 1917	3 years, 364 days	1913	Republican
8		Frank L. Dowling (c. 1865–1919)	January 1, 1918	September 27, 1919	1 year, 269 days	1917	Democratic
–		Michael F. Loughman (1866–1937); Acting	September 27, 1919	October 16, 1919	19 days	–	Democratic
9		Edward F. Boyle (c. 1876–1943); Interim	October 16, 1919	November 17, 1919 (Note: Boyle resigned to become chairman of the New York State Industrial Commission.)	32 days	App.	Democratic
–		Michael F. Loughman (1866–1937); Acting	November 17, 1919	December 31, 1919	44 days	–	Democratic
10		Henry H. Curran (1877–1966)	January 1, 1920	December 31, 1921	1 year, 364 days	1919 special	Republican
11	Portrait of Julius Miller	Julius Miller (1880–1955)	January 1, 1922	December 31, 1930 (Note: Miller resigned to become a justice of the New York State Supreme Court.)	8 years, 364 days	1921	Democratic
11	Portrait of Julius Miller	Julius Miller (1880–1955)	January 1, 1922	December 31, 1930	8 years, 364 days	1925	Democratic
11	Portrait of Julius Miller	Julius Miller (1880–1955)	January 1, 1922	December 31, 1930	8 years, 364 days	1929	Democratic
–		H. Warren Hubbard (c. 1872–1946); Acting	January 1, 1931	January 16, 1931	15 days	–	Democratic
12	Portrait of Samuel Levy	Samuel Levy (1876–1953)	January 16, 1931	December 31, 1937	6 years, 349 days	App.	Democratic
12	Portrait of Samuel Levy	Samuel Levy (1876–1953)	January 16, 1931	December 31, 1937	6 years, 349 days	1933	Democratic
13	Portrait of Stanley M. Isaacs	Stanley M. Isaacs (1882–1962)	January 1, 1938	December 31, 1941	3 years, 364 days	1937	Republican
14	Portrait of Edgar J. Nathan	Edgar J. Nathan (1891–1965)	January 1, 1942	December 31, 1945	3 years, 364 days	1941	Republican
15		Hugo Rogers (1899–1974)	January 1, 1946	December 31, 1949	3 years, 364 days	1945	Democratic
16	Portrait of Robert F. Wagner Jr.	Robert F. Wagner Jr. (1910–1991)	January 1, 1950	December 31, 1953 (Note: Wagner ran successfully for Mayor of New York City.)	3 years, 364 days	1949	Democratic
17	Portrait of Hulan Jack	Hulan Jack (1906–1986)	January 1, 1954	January 13, 1960 (Note: Jack suspended himself from office upon being indicted for conspiracy to obstruct justice and violations of the New York City charter.)	6 years, 12 days	1953	Democratic
17	Portrait of Hulan Jack	Hulan Jack (1906–1986)	January 1, 1954	January 13, 1960	6 years, 12 days	1957	Democratic
–		Louis A. Cioffi (TBA–TBA); Acting	January 13, 1960	March 15, 1960	62 days	–	Democratic
(17)	Portrait of Hulan Jack	Hulan Jack (1906–1986)	March 15, 1960 (Note: Jack resumed office after his indictment was dismissed on technical grounds.)	April 22, 1960 (Note: Jack suspended himself a second time when his indictment was reinstated and was removed from office upon his sentencing.)	38 days	–	Democratic
–		Louis A. Cioffi (TBA–TBA); Acting	April 22, 1960	January 31, 1961	284 days	–	Democratic
18		Edward Richard Dudley (1911–2005)	January 31, 1961	January 4, 1965 (Note: Dudley resigned to become a justice of the New York State Supreme Court.)	3 years, 339 days	App.	Democratic
18		Edward Richard Dudley (1911–2005)	January 31, 1961	January 4, 1965	3 years, 339 days	1961	Democratic
–		Earl Louis Brown (1903–1980); Acting	January 4, 1965	February 24, 1965	51 days	–	Democratic
19	Portrait of Constance Baker Motley	Constance Baker Motley (1921–2005)	February 24, 1965	September 8, 1966 (Note: Baker was appointed as a federal judge.)	1 year, 196 days	App.	Democratic
19	Portrait of Constance Baker Motley	Constance Baker Motley (1921–2005)	February 24, 1965	September 8, 1966	1 year, 196 days	1965	Democratic
–		Leonard N. Cohen (TBA–TBA); Acting	September 8, 1966	September 13, 1966	5 days	–	Democratic
20	Portrait of Percy Sutton	Percy Sutton (1920–2009)	September 13, 1966	December 31, 1977 (Note: Sutton ran unsuccessfully for Mayor of New York City.)	11 years, 110 days	App.	Democratic
20	Portrait of Percy Sutton	Percy Sutton (1920–2009)	September 13, 1966	December 31, 1977	11 years, 110 days	1966 special	Democratic
20	Portrait of Percy Sutton	Percy Sutton (1920–2009)	September 13, 1966	December 31, 1977	11 years, 110 days	1969	Democratic
20	Portrait of Percy Sutton	Percy Sutton (1920–2009)	September 13, 1966	December 31, 1977	11 years, 110 days	1973	Democratic
21	Portrait of Andrew Stein	Andrew Stein (born 1945)	January 1, 1978	December 31, 1985 (Note: Stein ran successfully for President of the New York City Council.)	7 years, 364 days	1977	Democratic
21	Portrait of Andrew Stein	Andrew Stein (born 1945)	January 1, 1978	December 31, 1985	7 years, 364 days	1981	Democratic
22	Portrait of David Dinkins	David Dinkins (1927–2020)	January 1, 1986	December 31, 1989 (Note: Dinkins ran successfully for Mayor of New York City.)	3 years, 364 days	1985	Democratic
23	Portrait of Ruth Messinger	Ruth Messinger (born 1940)	January 1, 1990	December 31, 1997 (Note: Messinger ran unsuccessfully for Mayor of New York City.)	7 years, 364 days	1989	Democratic
23	Portrait of Ruth Messinger	Ruth Messinger (born 1940)	January 1, 1990	December 31, 1997	7 years, 364 days	1993	Democratic
24	Portrait of C. Virginia Fields	C. Virginia Fields (born 1945)	January 1, 1998	December 31, 2005 (Note: Fields ran unsuccessfully for Mayor of New York City.)	7 years, 364 days	1997	Democratic
24	Portrait of C. Virginia Fields	C. Virginia Fields (born 1945)	January 1, 1998	December 31, 2005	7 years, 364 days	2001	Democratic
25	Portrait of Scott Stringer	Scott Stringer (born 1960)	January 1, 2006	December 31, 2013 (Note: Stringer ran successfully for New York City Comptroller.)	7 years, 364 days	2005	Democratic
25	Portrait of Scott Stringer	Scott Stringer (born 1960)	January 1, 2006	December 31, 2013	7 years, 364 days	2009	Democratic
26	Portrait of Gale Brewer	Gale Brewer (born 1951)	January 1, 2014	December 31, 2021	7 years, 364 days	2013	Democratic
26	Portrait of Gale Brewer	Gale Brewer (born 1951)	January 1, 2014	December 31, 2021	7 years, 364 days	2017	Democratic
27	Portrait of Mark Levine	Mark Levine (born 1969)	January 1, 2022	December 31, 2025 (Note: Levine ran successfully for New York City Comptroller.)	3 years, 364 days	2021	Democratic
28	Portrait of Brad Hoylman-Sigal	Brad Hoylman-Sigal (born 1965)	January 1, 2026	Incumbent (Note: Hoylman-Sigal's term expires on December 31, 2029; he is eligible to run for re-election.)	324 days	2025	Democratic

== Queens borough presidents ==
No.	Borough President		Took office	Left office	Tenure	Election	Party
1		Frederick Bowley (1851–1916)	January 1, 1898	December 31, 1901	3 years, 364 days	1897	Democratic
2	Portrait of Joseph Cassidy	Joseph Cassidy (c. 1866–1920)	January 1, 1902	December 31, 1905	3 years, 364 days	1901	Democratic
2	Portrait of Joseph Cassidy	Joseph Cassidy (c. 1866–1920)	January 1, 1902	December 31, 1905	3 years, 364 days	1903	Democratic
3	Portrait of Joseph Bermel	Joseph Bermel (1860–1921)	January 1, 1906	April 29, 1908 (Note: Bermel resigned while under investigation for corruption.)	2 years, 119 days	1905	Democratic
4	Portrait of Lawrence Gresser	Lawrence Gresser (1851–1935); Interim, then elected	April 30, 1908	September 27, 1911 (Note: Gresser was removed by Governor John Alden Dix for "inefficiency, incompetency, and neglect of duty.")	3 years, 150 days	App.	Democratic
4	Portrait of Lawrence Gresser	Lawrence Gresser (1851–1935); Interim, then elected	April 30, 1908	September 27, 1911	3 years, 150 days	1909	Democratic
–		Walter H. Bunn (1839–1918); Acting	September 27, 1911	October 4, 1911	7 days	–	Democratic
5		Maurice E. Connolly (1880–1935)	October 4, 1911	April 2, 1928 (Note: Connolly resigned while under investigation for official conspiracy.)	16 years, 181 days	App.	Democratic
5		Maurice E. Connolly (1880–1935)	October 4, 1911	April 2, 1928	16 years, 181 days	1913	Democratic
5		Maurice E. Connolly (1880–1935)	October 4, 1911	April 2, 1928	16 years, 181 days	1917	Democratic
5		Maurice E. Connolly (1880–1935)	October 4, 1911	April 2, 1928	16 years, 181 days	1921	Democratic
5		Maurice E. Connolly (1880–1935)	October 4, 1911	April 2, 1928	16 years, 181 days	1925	Democratic
–		Michael J. Shugrue (TBA–TBA); Acting	April 2, 1928	April 18, 1928	16 days	–	Democratic
6		Bernard M. Patten (c. 1882–1963); Interim	April 18, 1928	December 31, 1928	257 days	App.	Democratic
7		George U. Harvey (1881–1946)	January 1, 1929	December 31, 1941	12 years, 364 days	1928 special	Republican
7		George U. Harvey (1881–1946)	January 1, 1929	December 31, 1941	12 years, 364 days	1929	Republican
7		George U. Harvey (1881–1946)	January 1, 1929	December 31, 1941	12 years, 364 days	1933	Republican
7		George U. Harvey (1881–1946)	January 1, 1929	December 31, 1941	12 years, 364 days	1937	Republican
8		James A. Burke (1890–1965)	January 1, 1942	December 31, 1949	7 years, 364 days	1941	Democratic
8		James A. Burke (1890–1965)	January 1, 1942	December 31, 1949	7 years, 364 days	1945	Democratic
9		Maurice A. FitzGerald (1897–1951)	January 1, 1950	August 25, 1951 (Note: Died in office)	1 year, 236 days	1949	Democratic
–		Joseph F. Mafera (1895–1967); Interim	August 25, 1951	September 5, 1951	11 days	–	Democratic
10		Joseph F. Mafera (1895–1967); Interim	September 5, 1951	December 31, 1951 (Note: Mafera was instead named to the City Tax Commission by Mayor Vincent R. Impellitteri.)	117 days	App.	Democratic
11		James A. Lundy (c. 1906–1973)	January 1, 1952	December 31, 1957	5 years, 364 days	1951 special	Republican
11		James A. Lundy (c. 1906–1973)	January 1, 1952	December 31, 1957	5 years, 364 days	1953	Republican
12		James J. Crisona (1907–2003)	January 1, 1958	December 31, 1958 (Note: Crisona resigned to become a justice of the New York State Supreme Court.)	364 days	1957	Democratic
Vacant			January 1, 1959	January 5, 1959			
13		John T. Clancy (1903–1985)	January 5, 1959	December 31, 1962 (Note: Clancy resigned to become a Surrogate Court judge.)	3 years, 360 days	App.	Democratic
13		John T. Clancy (1903–1985)	January 5, 1959	December 31, 1962	3 years, 360 days	1959 special	Democratic
13		John T. Clancy (1903–1985)	January 5, 1959	December 31, 1962	3 years, 360 days	1961	Democratic
14		Mario J. Cariello (1907–1985)	January 2, 1963	December 31, 1968 (Note: Cariello resigned to become a justice of the New York State Supreme Court.)	5 years, 364 days	App.	Democratic
14		Mario J. Cariello (1907–1985)	January 2, 1963	December 31, 1968	5 years, 364 days	1965	Democratic
–		Sidney Leviss (1917–2007)	January 1, 1969	January 3, 1969	2 days	–	Democratic
15		Sidney Leviss (1917–2007)	January 3, 1969	September 18, 1971 (Note: Leviss resigned to run successfully for a seat on the New York State Supreme Court.)	2 years, 258 days	App.	Democratic
15		Sidney Leviss (1917–2007)	January 3, 1969	September 18, 1971	2 years, 258 days	1969	Democratic
16	Portrait of Donald Manes	Donald Manes (1934–1986)	September 22, 1971	February 11, 1986 (Note: Manes resigned during a corruption investigation ahead of his indictment. He committed suicide a month later.)	14 years, 142 days	App.	Democratic
16	Portrait of Donald Manes	Donald Manes (1934–1986)	September 22, 1971	February 11, 1986	14 years, 142 days	1971 special	Democratic
16	Portrait of Donald Manes	Donald Manes (1934–1986)	September 22, 1971	February 11, 1986	14 years, 142 days	1973	Democratic
16	Portrait of Donald Manes	Donald Manes (1934–1986)	September 22, 1971	February 11, 1986	14 years, 142 days	1977	Democratic
16	Portrait of Donald Manes	Donald Manes (1934–1986)	September 22, 1971	February 11, 1986	14 years, 142 days	1981	Democratic
16	Portrait of Donald Manes	Donald Manes (1934–1986)	September 22, 1971	February 11, 1986	14 years, 142 days	1985	Democratic
–	Portrait of Claire Shulman	Claire Shulman (1926–2020)	February 11, 1986	March 12, 1986	29 days	–	Democratic
17	Portrait of Claire Shulman	Claire Shulman (1926–2020)	March 12, 1986	December 31, 2001	15 years, 294 days	App.	Democratic
17	Portrait of Claire Shulman	Claire Shulman (1926–2020)	March 12, 1986	December 31, 2001	15 years, 294 days	1986 special	Democratic
17	Portrait of Claire Shulman	Claire Shulman (1926–2020)	March 12, 1986	December 31, 2001	15 years, 294 days	1989	Democratic
17	Portrait of Claire Shulman	Claire Shulman (1926–2020)	March 12, 1986	December 31, 2001	15 years, 294 days	1993	Democratic
17	Portrait of Claire Shulman	Claire Shulman (1926–2020)	March 12, 1986	December 31, 2001	15 years, 294 days	1997	Democratic
18	Portrait of Helen M. Marshall	Helen M. Marshall (1929–2017)	January 1, 2002	December 31, 2013	11 years, 364 days	2001	Democratic
18	Portrait of Helen M. Marshall	Helen M. Marshall (1929–2017)	January 1, 2002	December 31, 2013	11 years, 364 days	2005	Democratic
18	Portrait of Helen M. Marshall	Helen M. Marshall (1929–2017)	January 1, 2002	December 31, 2013	11 years, 364 days	2009	Democratic
19	Portrait of Melinda Katz	Melinda Katz (born 1965)	January 1, 2014	December 31, 2019 (Note: Katz resigned to become Queens County District Attorney.)	5 years, 364 days	2013	Democratic
19	Portrait of Melinda Katz	Melinda Katz (born 1965)	January 1, 2014	December 31, 2019	5 years, 364 days	2017	Democratic
–		Sharon Lee (born TBA); Acting	January 1, 2020	December 2, 2020	336 days	–	Democratic
20	Portrait of Donovan Richards	Donovan Richards (born 1983)	December 2, 2020	Incumbent (Note: Richards's second full term began on January 1, 2026, and is set to expire on December 31, 2029; he will be term-limited.)	5 years, 354 days	2020 special	Democratic
20	Portrait of Donovan Richards	Donovan Richards (born 1983)	December 2, 2020	Incumbent	5 years, 354 days	2021	Democratic
20	Portrait of Donovan Richards	Donovan Richards (born 1983)	December 2, 2020	Incumbent	5 years, 354 days	2025	Democratic

== Richmond/Staten Island borough presidents ==
The Borough of Richmond was renamed the Borough of Staten Island in 1975. The county is still named Richmond County.

No.	Borough President		Took office	Left office	Tenure	Election	Party
1	Portrait of George Cromwell	George Cromwell (1860–1934)	May 24, 1898 (Note: Cromwell was elected in November 1897 but not sworn into office until May 1898 because the election results were disputed and appealed.)	December 31, 1913	15 years, 221 days	1897	Republican
1	Portrait of George Cromwell	George Cromwell (1860–1934)	May 24, 1898	December 31, 1913	15 years, 221 days	1901	Republican
1	Portrait of George Cromwell	George Cromwell (1860–1934)	May 24, 1898	December 31, 1913	15 years, 221 days	1903	Republican
1	Portrait of George Cromwell	George Cromwell (1860–1934)	May 24, 1898	December 31, 1913	15 years, 221 days	1905	Republican
1	Portrait of George Cromwell	George Cromwell (1860–1934)	May 24, 1898	December 31, 1913	15 years, 221 days	1909	Republican
2		Charles J. McCormack (1865–1915)	January 1, 1914	July 11, 1915 (Note: Died in office)	1 year, 191 days	1913	Democratic
–		Spire Pitou Jr. (1874–1946); Acting	July 11, 1915	July 29, 1915	18 days	–	Democratic
3		Calvin D. Van Name (1857–1924)	July 29, 1915	December 31, 1921	6 years, 155 days	App.	Democratic
3		Calvin D. Van Name (1857–1924)	July 29, 1915	December 31, 1921	6 years, 155 days	1917	Democratic
4		Matthew J. Cahill (1869–1922)	January 1, 1922	July 14, 1922	194 days	1921	Democratic
Vacant			July 14, 1922	July 18, 1922			
5		John A. Lynch (1882–1954)	July 18, 1922	December 31, 1933	11 years, 166 days	App.	Democratic
5		John A. Lynch (1882–1954)	July 18, 1922	December 31, 1933	11 years, 166 days	1922 special	Democratic
5		John A. Lynch (1882–1954)	July 18, 1922	December 31, 1933	11 years, 166 days	1925	Democratic
5		John A. Lynch (1882–1954)	July 18, 1922	December 31, 1933	11 years, 166 days	1929	Democratic
6		Joseph A. Palma (1889–1969)	January 1, 1934	December 31, 1945	11 years, 364 days	1933	Republican
6		Joseph A. Palma (1889–1969)	January 1, 1934	December 31, 1945	11 years, 364 days	1937	Republican
6		Joseph A. Palma (1889–1969)	January 1, 1934	December 31, 1945	11 years, 364 days	1941	Republican
7		Cornelius A. Hall (1889–1953)	January 1, 1946	February 12, 1953 (Note: Hall retired due to illness and died less than a month later.)	7 years, 42 days	1945	Democratic
7		Cornelius A. Hall (1889–1953)	January 1, 1946	February 12, 1953	7 years, 42 days	1949	Democratic
–		Thomas F. Reilly (1895–1969); Acting	February 12, 1953	February 20, 1953	8 days	–	Democratic
8		Edward G. Baker (1906–1971)	February 20, 1953	December 31, 1954 (Note: Baker resigned to become a justice of the New York State Supreme Court.)	1 year, 314 days	App.	Democratic
8		Edward G. Baker (1906–1971)	February 20, 1953	December 31, 1954	1 year, 314 days	1953	Democratic
9		Albert V. Maniscalco (1908–1998)	January 1, 1955	December 31, 1965	10 years, 364 days	App.	Democratic
9		Albert V. Maniscalco (1908–1998)	January 1, 1955	December 31, 1965	10 years, 364 days	1955 special	Democratic
9		Albert V. Maniscalco (1908–1998)	January 1, 1955	December 31, 1965	10 years, 364 days	1957	Democratic
9		Albert V. Maniscalco (1908–1998)	January 1, 1955	December 31, 1965	10 years, 364 days	1961	Democratic
10		Robert T. Connor (1919–2009)	January 1, 1966	June 10, 1977 (Note: Connor resigned to become deputy assistant to the Secretary of the Navy.)	11 years, 160 days	1965	Republican
10		Robert T. Connor (1919–2009)	January 1, 1966	June 10, 1977	11 years, 160 days	1969	Republican
10		Robert T. Connor (1919–2009)	January 1, 1966	June 10, 1977	11 years, 160 days	1973	Republican
11		Anthony Gaeta (1927–1988)	June 10, 1977	November 10, 1984	7 years, 153 days	App.	Democratic
11		Anthony Gaeta (1927–1988)	June 10, 1977	November 10, 1984	7 years, 153 days	1977	Democratic
11		Anthony Gaeta (1927–1988)	June 10, 1977	November 10, 1984	7 years, 153 days	1981	Democratic
12		Ralph J. Lamberti (1934–2025)	November 10, 1984	December 31, 1989	5 years, 51 days	App.	Democratic
12		Ralph J. Lamberti (1934–2025)	November 10, 1984	December 31, 1989	5 years, 51 days	1985	Democratic
13	Portrait of Guy Molinari	Guy Molinari (1928–2018)	January 1, 1990	December 31, 2001	11 years, 364 days	1989	Republican
13	Portrait of Guy Molinari	Guy Molinari (1928–2018)	January 1, 1990	December 31, 2001	11 years, 364 days	1993	Republican
13	Portrait of Guy Molinari	Guy Molinari (1928–2018)	January 1, 1990	December 31, 2001	11 years, 364 days	1997	Republican
14	Portrait of James Molinaro	James Molinaro (born 1931)	January 1, 2002	December 31, 2013	11 years, 364 days	2001	Conservative
14	Portrait of James Molinaro	James Molinaro (born 1931)	January 1, 2002	December 31, 2013	11 years, 364 days	2005	Conservative
14	Portrait of James Molinaro	James Molinaro (born 1931)	January 1, 2002	December 31, 2013	11 years, 364 days	2009	Conservative
15	Portrait of James Oddo	James Oddo (born 1966)	January 1, 2014	December 31, 2021	7 years, 364 days	2013	Republican
15	Portrait of James Oddo	James Oddo (born 1966)	January 1, 2014	December 31, 2021	7 years, 364 days	2017	Republican
16	Portrait of Vito Fossella	Vito Fossella (born 1965)	January 1, 2022	Incumbent (Note: Fossella's second term began on January 1, 2026, and is set to expire on December 31, 2029; he will be term-limited.)	4 years, 324 days	2021	Republican
16	Portrait of Vito Fossella	Vito Fossella (born 1965)	January 1, 2022	Incumbent	4 years, 324 days	2025	Republican

== See also ==
- Borough president
