= 2005 New York City borough president elections =

2005 borough elections held in New York City

- November 8, 2005
	Majority party	Minority party	Third party
Party	Democratic	Republican	Conservative
Seats before	4	0	1
Seats won	4	0	1
Seat change	Steady	Steady	Steady
Popular vote	774,891	155,375	48,432
Percentage	76.30% (Note: Totals may be combined with that of other parties who cross-endorsed Democratic Party candidates via electoral fusion.)	15.30% (Note: Totals may be combined with that of other parties who cross-endorsed Republican Party candidates via electoral fusion.)	4.77% (Note: Totals may be combined with that of other parties who cross-endorsed Conservative Party candidates via electoral fusion.)
- Results: Democratic hold Conservative hold

The 2005 New York City borough president elections were held on November 8, 2005 to elect the presidents of each of the five boroughs in New York City. They coincided with other city elections, including for mayor, comptroller, public advocate, and city council. Primary elections were held on September 13, 2005.

The winning candidates were as follows:

- The Bronx: Adolfo Carrión Jr., incumbent borough president (Democratic)
- Brooklyn: Marty Markowitz, incumbent borough president (Democratic)
- Manhattan: Scott Stringer, New York State Assembly member (Democratic)
- Queens: Helen Marshall, incumbent borough president (Democratic)
- Staten Island: James Molinaro, incumbent borough president (Conservative)

== Overview ==
Borough	Democratic		Republican		Others		Total		Result
Borough	Votes	%	Votes	%	Votes	%	Votes	%	Result
The Bronx	138,133	87.01%	20,626	12.99%	2	0.00%	158,761	100.0%	Democratic hold
Brooklyn	222,591	80.66%	32,444	11.76%	20,937	7.59%	275,972	100.0%	Democratic hold
Manhattan	200,152	77.64%	41,698	16.18%	15,933	6.18%	257,783	100.0%	Democratic hold
Queens	179,992	74.80%	60,607	25.19%	16	0.01%	240,615	100.0%	Democratic hold
Staten Island	34,023	41.26%	N/A	N/A	48,436	58.74%	82,459	100.0%	Conservative hold
Total	774,891	76.30%	155,375	15.30%	85,324	8.40%	1,015,590	100.0%	

== The Bronx ==
2005 Bronx presidential election

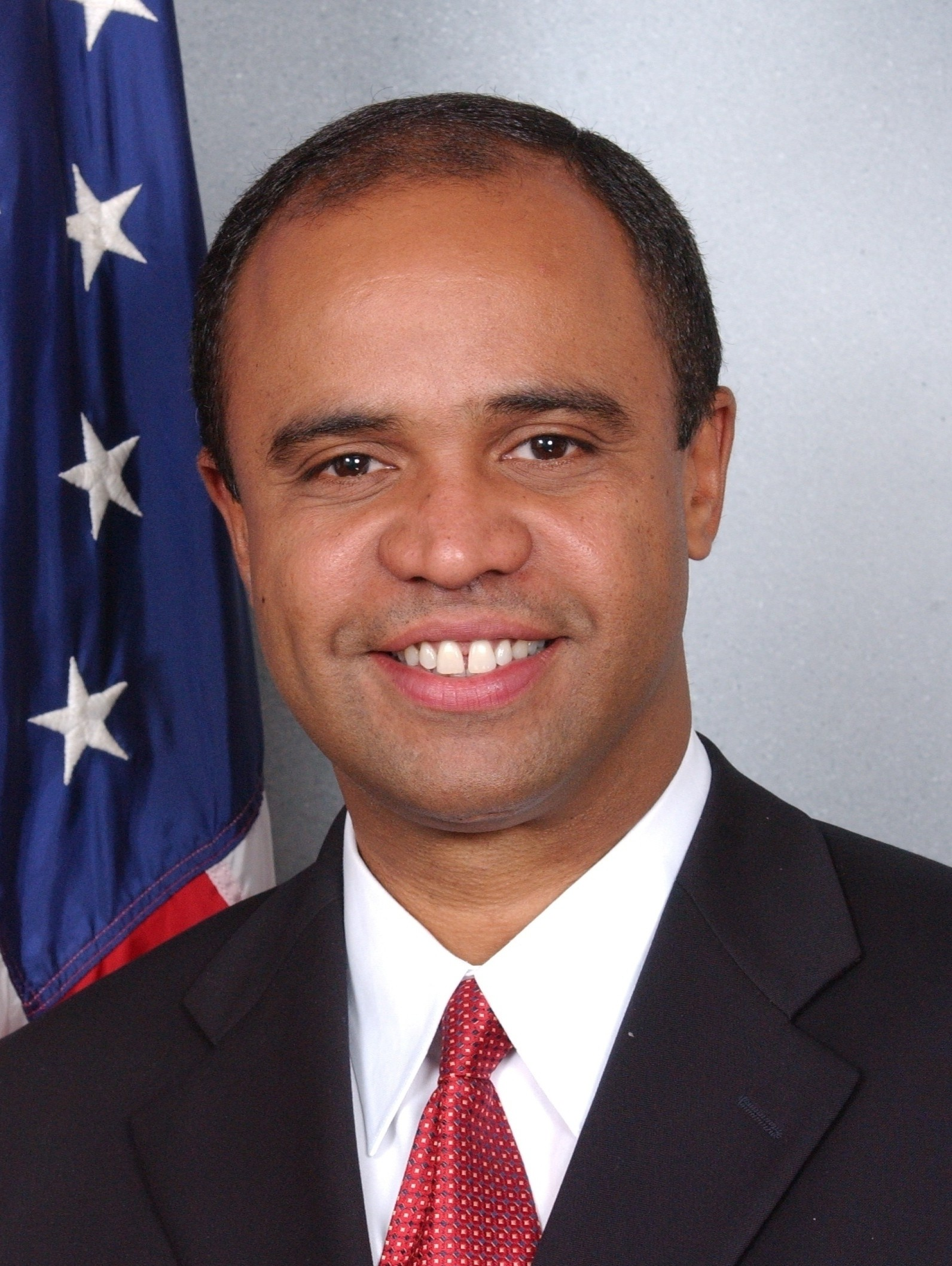

Nominee	Adolfo Carrión Jr.	Kevin Brawley
Party	Democratic	Republican
Alliance	Working Families	Conservative
Popular vote	138,133	20,626
Percentage	87.01%	12.99%
- State Assembly results Carrión: 70–80% 80–90% >90%
President before election
Adolfo Carrión Jr.
Democratic
Elected President
Adolfo Carrión Jr.
Democratic

Incumbent Bronx Borough President Adolfo Carrión Jr. ran for a second term.

=== Candidate ===
- Adolfo Carrión Jr., incumbent Borough President

=== Republican ===
==== Candidate ====
- Kevin Brawley, consultant and chair of the Bronx Conservative Party

=== General Election ===
Carrión won the election with 87% of the vote, with Brawley receiving 13%.

2005 Bronx Borough President Election
Party	Candidate	Votes	%
Democratic	Adolfo Carrión Jr.	133,093	83.83
Working Families	Adolfo Carrión Jr.	5,040	3.17
Total	Adolfo Carrión Jr. (incumbent)	138,133	87.01
Republican	Kevin Brawley	18,347	11.56
Conservative	Kevin Brawley	2,279	1.44
Total	Kevin Brawley	20,626	12.99
Write-in		2	0.00
Total votes		158,761	100.00
Democratic hold			

== Brooklyn ==
2005 Brooklyn presidential election

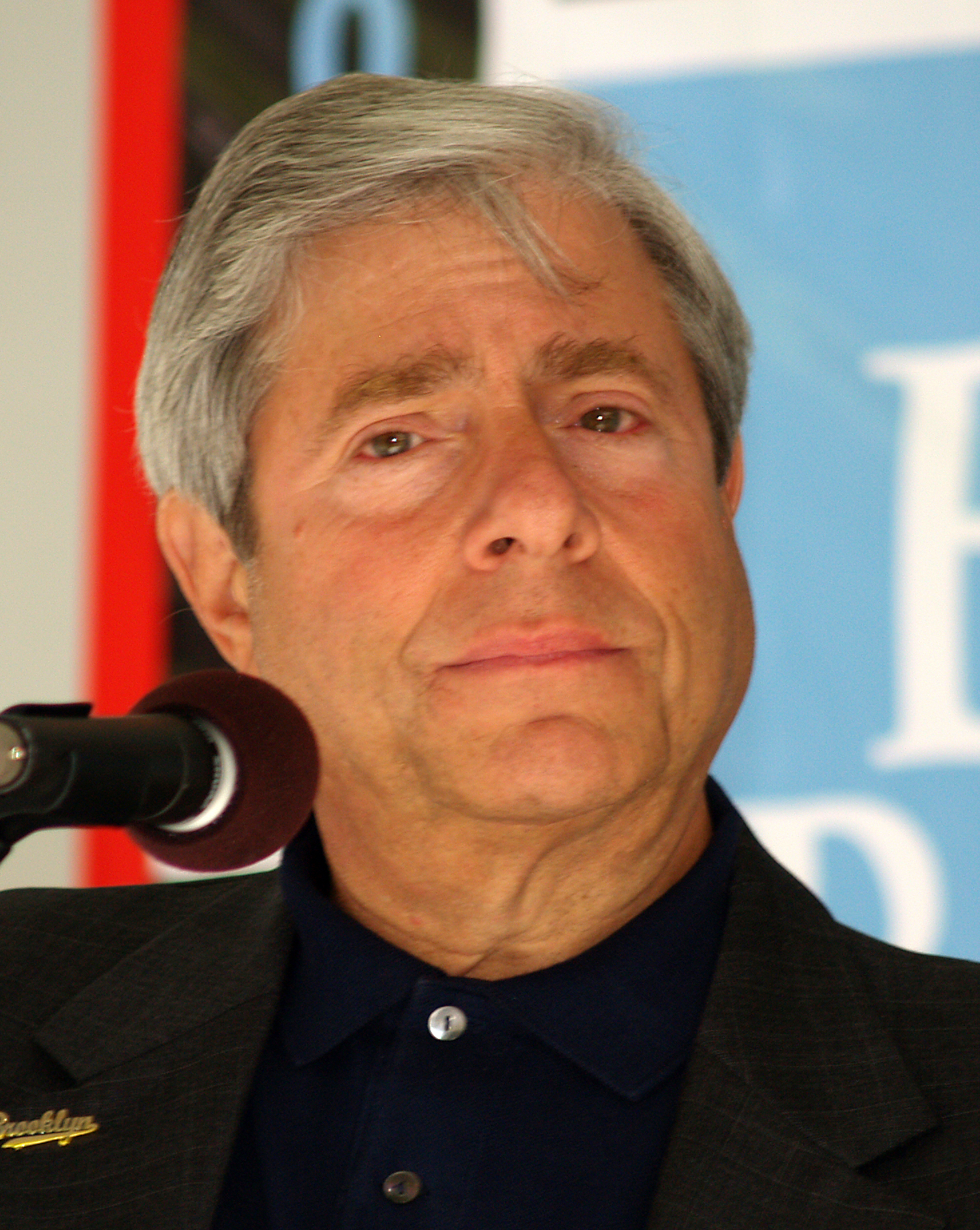

Nominee	Marty Markowitz	Theodore Alatsas	Gloria Mattera
Party	Democratic	Republican	Green
Alliance	Working Families	Conservative
Popular vote	222,591	32,444	18,944
Percentage	80.66%	11.76%	6.86%
- State Assembly results Markowitz: 60–70% 70–80% 80–90% >90%
President before election
Marty Markowitz
Democratic
Elected President
Marty Markowitz
Democratic

Incumbent Brooklyn Borough President Marty Markowitz ran for a second term.

=== Democratic ===
==== Candidate ====
- Marty Markowitz, incumbent Borough President

=== Republican ===
==== Candidate ====
- Theodore Alatsas

=== Minor Third Parties ===
Any candidate not among the qualified New York parties had to petition their way onto the ballot; they did not face primary elections.

=== Libertarian ===
==== Candidate ====
- Gary Popkin, retired college professor (Note: Cross-endorsed by the Reform Party.)

=== Green ===
==== Candidate ====
- Gloria Mattera, educator

=== Reform ===
==== Candidate ====
- Gary Popkin, retired college professor (Note: Cross-endorsed by the Libertarian Party.)

=== General Election ===
Markowitz won reelection with 80.7% of the vote, with Alatsas and Mattera receiving 11.8% and 6.9%, respectively.

2005 Brooklyn Borough President Election Results
Party	Candidate	Votes	%
Democratic	Marty Markowitz	210,459	76.26
Working Families	Marty Markowitz	12,132	4.40
Total	Marty Markowitz (incumbent)	222,591	80.66
Republican	Theodore Alatsas	28,300	10.25
Conservative	Theodore Alatsas	4,144	1.50
Total	Theodore Alatsas	32,444	11.76
Green	Gloria Mattera	18,944	6.86
Libertarian	Gary Popkin (Note: Vote totals include the Reform Party ballot line.)	1,991	0.72
Write-in		2	0.00
Total votes		275,972	100.00
Democratic hold			

== Manhattan ==
2005 Manhattan presidential election

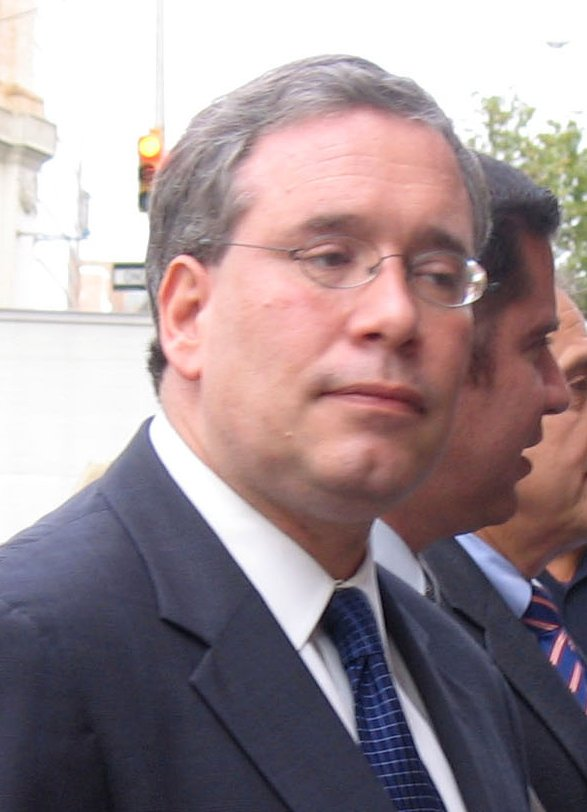

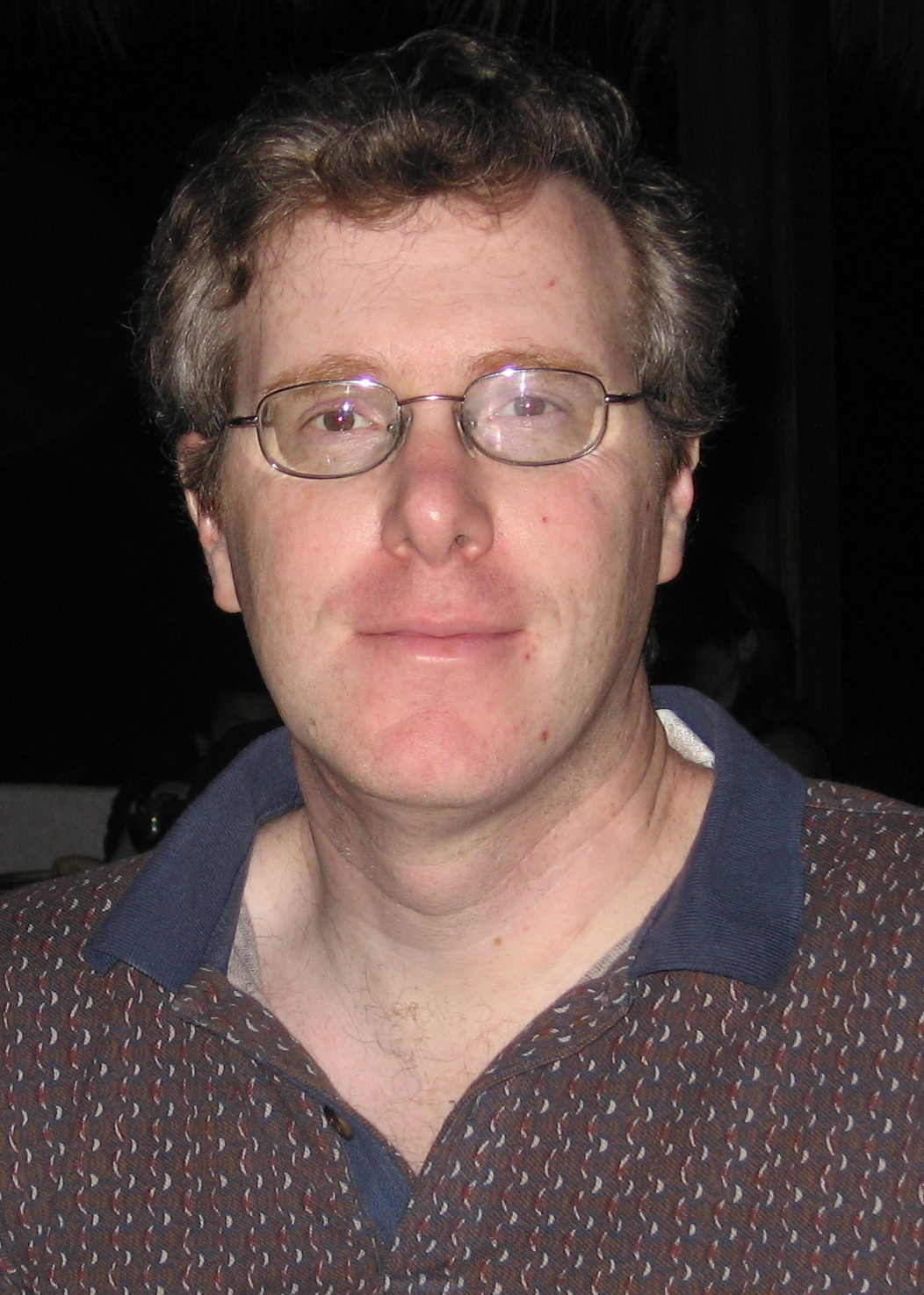
Nominee	Scott Stringer	Barry Popik
Party	Democratic	Republican
Alliance		Liberal
Popular vote	200,152	41,698
Percentage	77.64%	16.18%
- State Assembly results Stringer: 60–70% 70–80% 80–90%
President before election
C. Virginia Fields
Democratic
Elected President
Scott Stringer
Democratic

Incumbent Manhattan Borough President C. Virginia Fields was ineligible to run for a third term and ran for mayor of New York City in the Democratic primary.

=== Democratic primary ===
==== Candidates ====
- Brian Ellner, media and political strategist
- Adriano Espaillat, New York State Assembly member
- Margarita López, New York City Council member
- Carlos Manzano
- Stanley Michels, former New York City Council member
- Eva Moskowitz, New York City Council member
- Bill Perkins, New York City Council member
- Scott Stringer, New York State Assembly member
- Keith L. T. Wright, New York State Assembly member

==== Results ====
2005 Manhattan Borough President Democratic Primary Results
Party	Candidate	Votes	%
Democratic	Scott Stringer	40,226	26.08
Democratic	Eva Moskowitz	26,348	17.08
Democratic	Margarita López	20,126	13.05
Democratic	Brian Ellner	17,791	11.54
Democratic	Bill Perkins	16,690	10.82
Democratic	Adriano Espaillat	13,999	9.08
Democratic	Keith L. T. Wright	8,078	5.24
Democratic	Stanley Michels	5,684	3.69
Democratic	Carlos Manzano	5,282	3.42
Write-in		2	0.00
Total votes		154,226	100.00

=== Republican ===
==== Candidate ====
- Barry Popik, etymologist and lawyer

=== Minor Third Parties ===
Any candidate not among the qualified New York parties had to petition their way onto the ballot; they did not face primary elections.

=== Independence ===
==== Candidate ====
- Jesse A. Fields, physician

=== Libertarian ===
==== Candidate ====
- Joseph Dobrian, journalist and consultant

=== Socialist Workers ===
==== Candidate ====
- Arrin T. Hawkins

=== General Election ===
Stringer won the election with 77.6% of the vote, with Popik receiving 16.2%.

2005 Manhattan Borough President Election
Party	Candidate	Votes	%
Democratic	Scott Stringer	200,152	77.64
Republican	Barry Popik	40,974	15.89
Liberal	Barry Popik	724	0.28
Total	Barry Popik	41,698	16.18
Independence	Jesse A. Fields	11,282	4.38
Libertarian	Joseph Dobrian	2,678	1.04
Socialist Workers	Arrin T. Hawkins	1,967	0.76
Write-in		6	0.00
Total votes		257,783	100.00
Democratic hold			

== Queens ==
2005 Queens presidential election

Nominee	Helen Marshall	Philip T. Sica
Party	Democratic	Republican
Alliance	Working Families	Conservative
Popular vote	179,992	60,607
Percentage	74.80%	25.19%
- State Assembly results Marshall: 60–70% 70–80% 80–90% >90%
President before election
Helen Marshall
Democratic
Elected President
Helen Marshall
Democratic

Incumbent Queens Borough President Helen Marshall ran for a second term.

=== Democratic ===
==== Candidate ====
- Helen Marshall, incumbent borough president

=== Republican ===
==== Candidate ====
- Philip T. Sica, realtor

=== General Election ===
Marshall won reelection with 74.8% of the vote, with Sica receiving 25.2%.

2005 Queens Borough President Election
Party	Candidate	Votes	%
Democratic	Helen M. Marshall	171,546	71.29
Working Families	Helen M. Marshall	8,446	3.51
Total	Helen M. Marshall (incumbent)	179,992	74.80
Republican	Philip T. Sica	53,472	22.22
Conservative	Philip T. Sica	7,135	2.97
Total	Philip T. Sica	60,607	25.19
Write-in		16	0.01
Total votes		240,615	100.00
Democratic hold			

== Staten Island ==
2005 Staten Island presidential election
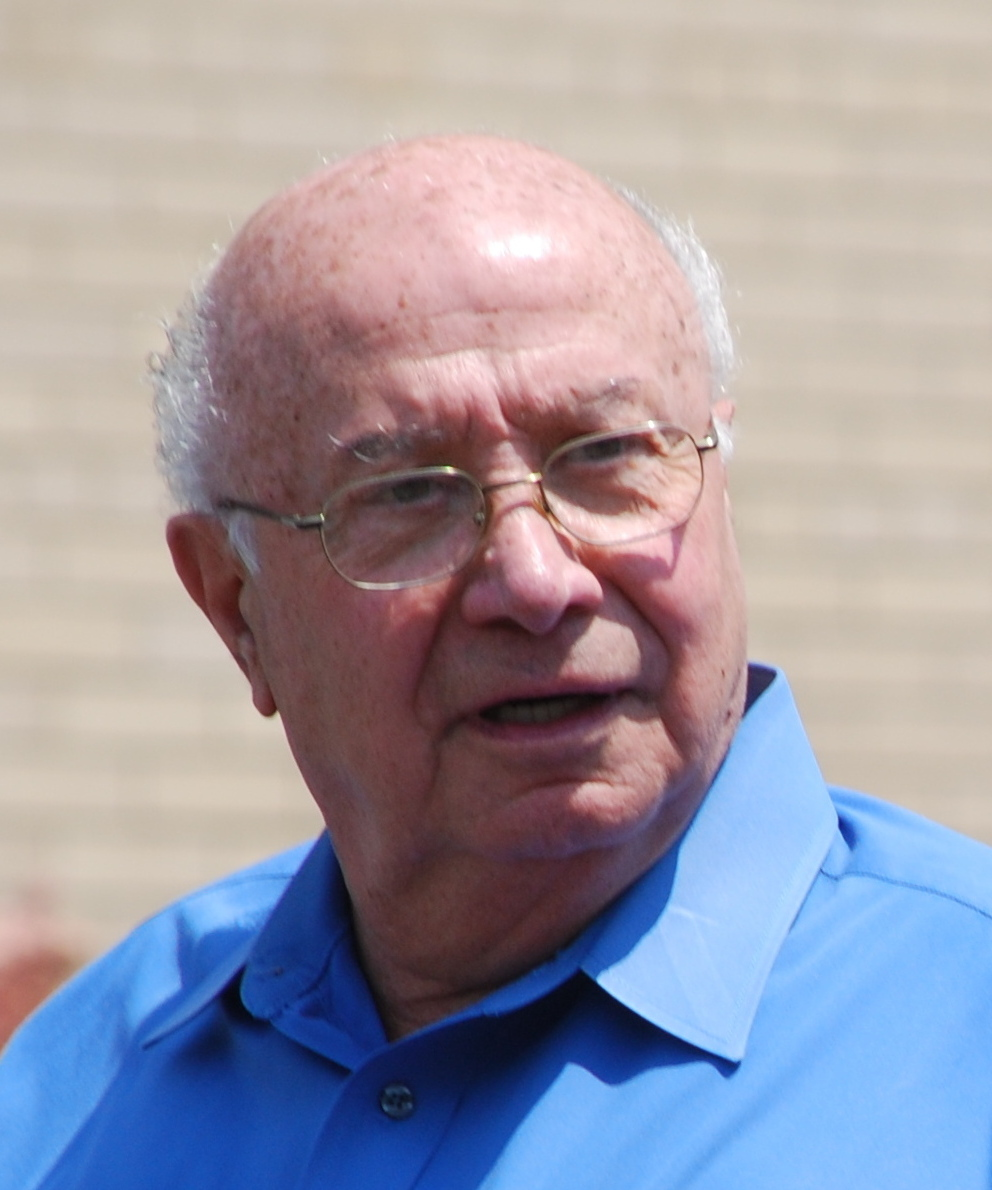

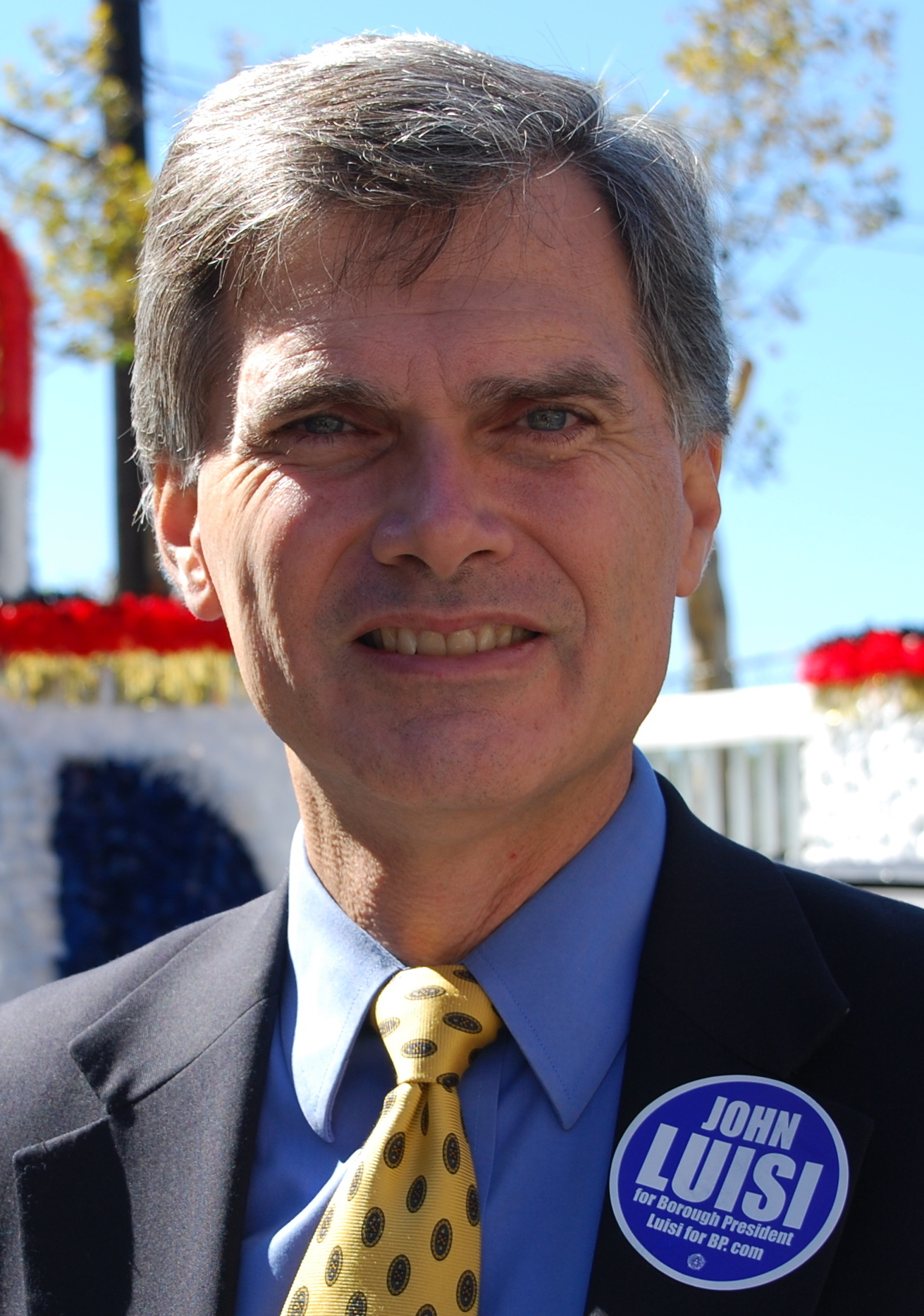
Nominee	James Molinaro	John Luisi
Party	Conservative	Democratic
Alliance	Republican	Independence; Working Families
Popular vote	48,432	34,023
Percentage	58.73%	41.26%
- State Assembly results Molinaro: 60–70% Luisi: 50–60%
President before election
James Molinaro
Conservative
Elected President
James Molinaro
Conservative

Incumbent Staten Island Borough President James Molinaro ran for a second term.

=== Democratic ===
==== Candidates ====
- John Luisi, attorney

=== Conservative ===
==== Candidates ====
- James Molinaro, incumbent Borough President (Note: Cross-endorsed by the Republican Party.)

=== General Election ===
Molinaro won reelection with 58.7% of the vote, with Luisi receiving 41.3%.

2005 Staten Island Borough President Election
Party	Candidate	Votes	%
Republican	James Molinaro	43,488	52.74
Conservative	James Molinaro	4,944	6.00
Total	James Molinaro (incumbent)	48,432	58.73
Democratic	John V. Luisi	30,072	36.47
Independence	John V. Luisi	2,587	3.14
Working Families	John V. Luisi	1,364	1.65
Total	John V. Luisi	34,023	41.26
Write-in		4	0.00
Total votes		82,459	100.00
Conservative hold			
