= 2009 New York City borough president elections =

- November 3, 2009
	Majority party	Minority party	Third party
Party	Democratic	Republican	Conservative
Seats before	4	0	1
Seats won	4	0	1
Seat change	Steady	Steady	Steady
Popular vote	739,548	132,354	57,771
Percentage	78.87% (Note: Totals may be combined with that of other parties who cross-endorsed Democratic Party candidates via electoral fusion.)	14.11% (Note: Totals may be combined with that of other parties who cross-endorsed Republican Party candidates via electoral fusion.)	6.16% (Note: Totals may be combined with that of other parties who cross-endorsed Conservative Party candidates via electoral fusion.)
- Results: Democratic hold Conservative hold

The 2009 New York City borough president elections were held on November 3, 2009 to elect the presidents of each of the five boroughs in New York City. They coincided with other city elections, including for mayor, comptroller, public advocate, and city council. Primary elections were held on September 15, 2009.

The winning candidates were as follows:

- The Bronx: Rubén Díaz, Jr., incumbent borough president (Democratic)
- Brooklyn: Marty Markowitz, incumbent borough president (Democratic)
- Manhattan: Scott Stringer, incumbent borough president (Democratic)
- Queens: Helen Marshall, incumbent borough president (Democratic)
- Staten Island: James Molinaro, incumbent borough president (Conservative)

== Overview ==
Borough	Democratic		Republican		Others		Total		Result
Borough	Votes	%	Votes	%	Votes	%	Votes	%	Result
The Bronx	96,135	87.15%	14,160	12.84%	11	0.01%	110,306	100.0%	Democratic hold
Brooklyn	239,326	85.81%	34,620	12.41%	4,964	1.78%	278,910	100.0%	Democratic hold
Manhattan	195,194	83.02%	36,879	15.69%	3,041	1.29%	235,114	100.0%	Democratic hold
Queens	180,268	76.30%	46,695	19.76%	9,300	3.94%	236,263	100.0%	Democratic hold
Staten Island	28,625	37.11%	N/A	N/A	48,503	62.89%	77,128	100.0%	Conservative hold
Total	739,548	78.87%	132,354	14.11%	65,819	7.02%	937,721	100.0%	

== The Bronx ==
2009 Bronx presidential election

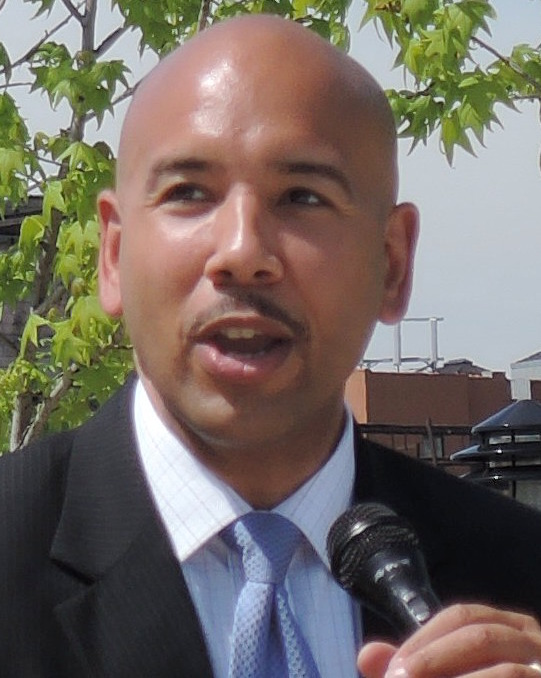

Nominee	Rubén Díaz Jr.	Allison Oldak
Party	Democratic	Republican
Alliance	Conservative
Popular vote	96,135	14,160
Percentage	87.15%	12.84%
- State Assembly results Díaz: 70–80% 80–90% >90%
President before election
Rubén Díaz Jr.
Democratic
Elected President
Rubén Díaz Jr.
Democratic

In February 2009 incumbent Bronx Borough President Adolfo Carrión Jr. was appointed by U.S. President Barack Obama to serve as director of the newly created White House Office of Urban Affairs and resigned the presidency. A special election was held on April 21, 2009, with New York State Assembly member Rubén Díaz Jr. defeating Republican candidate Anthony Ribustello with 86% of the vote.

=== Special Election ===
==== Candidates ====
- Rubén Díaz Jr., member of the New York State Assembly
- Anthony Ribustello, actor

==== Results ====
2009 Bronx Borough President Special Election Results
Party	Candidate	Votes	%
Democratic	Rubén Díaz Jr.	29,420	86.33
Republican	Anthony Ribustello	4,646	13.63
Write-in		11	0.03
Total votes		34,077	100.00
Democratic hold			

=== Democratic ===
==== Candidate ====
- Rubén Díaz Jr., incumbent Borough President

=== Republican ===
==== Candidate ====
- Allison Oldak

=== General Election ===
Díaz won the election with 87.1% of the vote, with Oldak receiving 12.8%.

2009 Bronx Borough President Election Results
Party	Candidate	Votes	%
Democratic	Rubén Díaz Jr.	92,876	84.20
Conservative	Rubén Díaz Jr.	3,259	2.95
Total	Rubén Díaz Jr. (incumbent)	96,135	87.15
Republican	Allison M. Oldak	14,160	12.84
Write-in		11	0.01
Total votes		110,306	100.00
Democratic hold			

== Brooklyn ==
2009 Brooklyn presidential election

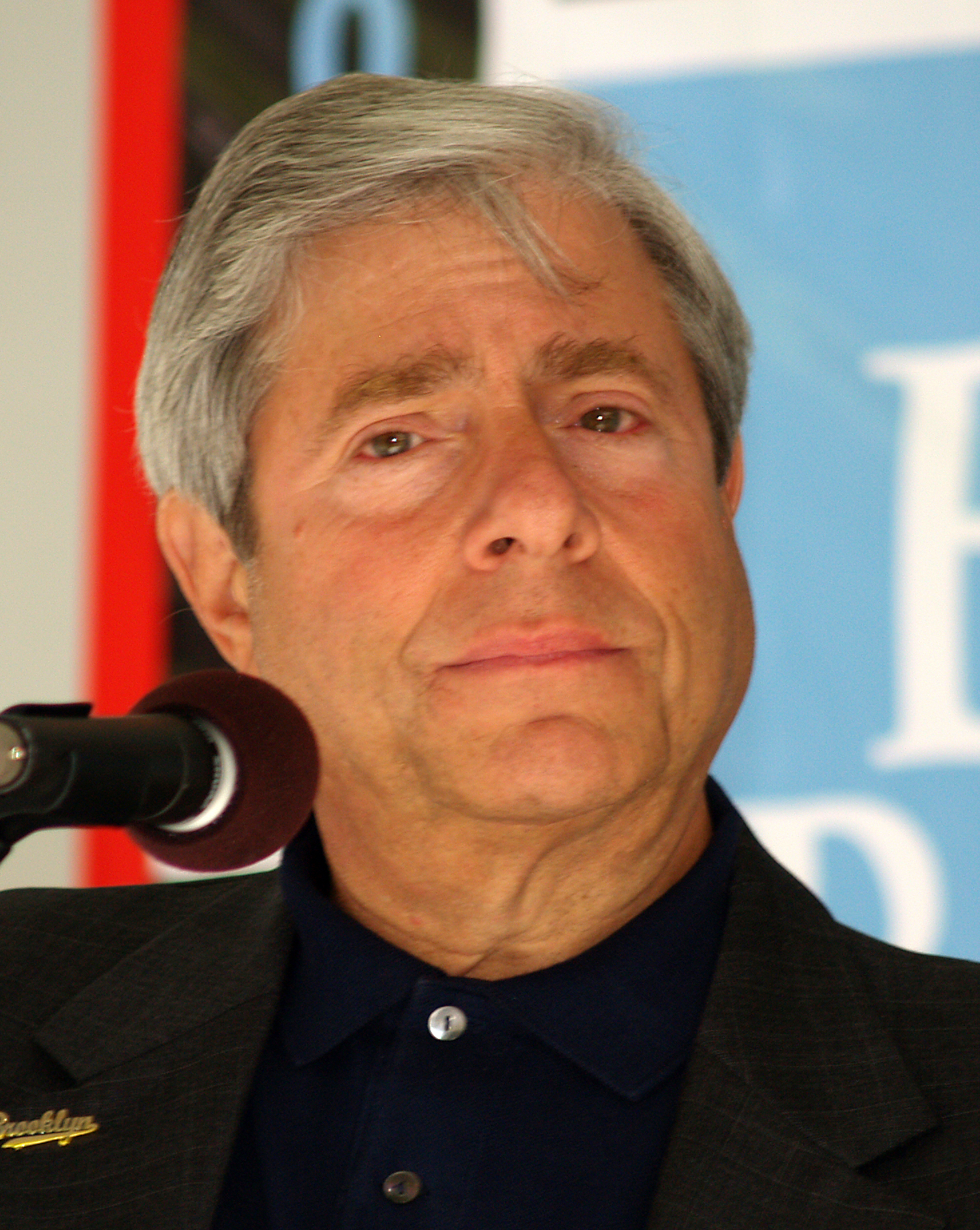

Nominee	Marty Markowitz	Marc D'Ottavio
Party	Democratic	Republican
Alliance	Working Families	Conservative
Popular vote	239,326	34,620
Percentage	85.81%	12.41%
- State Assembly results Markowitz: 70–80% 80–90% >90%
President before election
Marty Markowitz
Democratic
Elected President
Marty Markowitz
Democratic

Incumbent Brooklyn Borough President Marty Markowitz ran for a third and final term. He considered running for mayor but decided against it and endorsed incumbent Mayor Michael Bloomberg.

=== Democratic ===
==== Candidate ====
- Marty Markowitz, incumbent Borough President

=== Republican ===
==== Candidate ====
- Marc D'Ottavio, automobile sales manager

=== Minor Third Party ===
Any candidate not among the qualified New York parties had to petition their way onto the ballot; they did not face primary elections.

=== Libertarian ===
==== Candidate ====
- Michael Sanchez

=== General Election ===
Markowitz won reelection with 85.8% of the vote, with D'Ottavio receiving 12.4%.

2009 Brooklyn Borough President Election Results
Party	Candidate	Votes	%
Democratic	Marty Markowitz	219,716	78.78
Working Families	Marty Markowitz	19,610	7.03
Total	Marty Markowitz (incumbent)	239,326	85.81
Republican	Marc L. D'Ottavio	28,798	10.33
Conservative	Marc L. D'Ottavio	5,822	2.09
Total	Marc L. D'Ottavio	34,620	12.41
Libertarian	Michael Sanchez	4,916	1.76
Write-in		48	0.02
Total votes		278,910	100.00
Democratic hold			

== Manhattan ==
2009 Manhattan presidential election

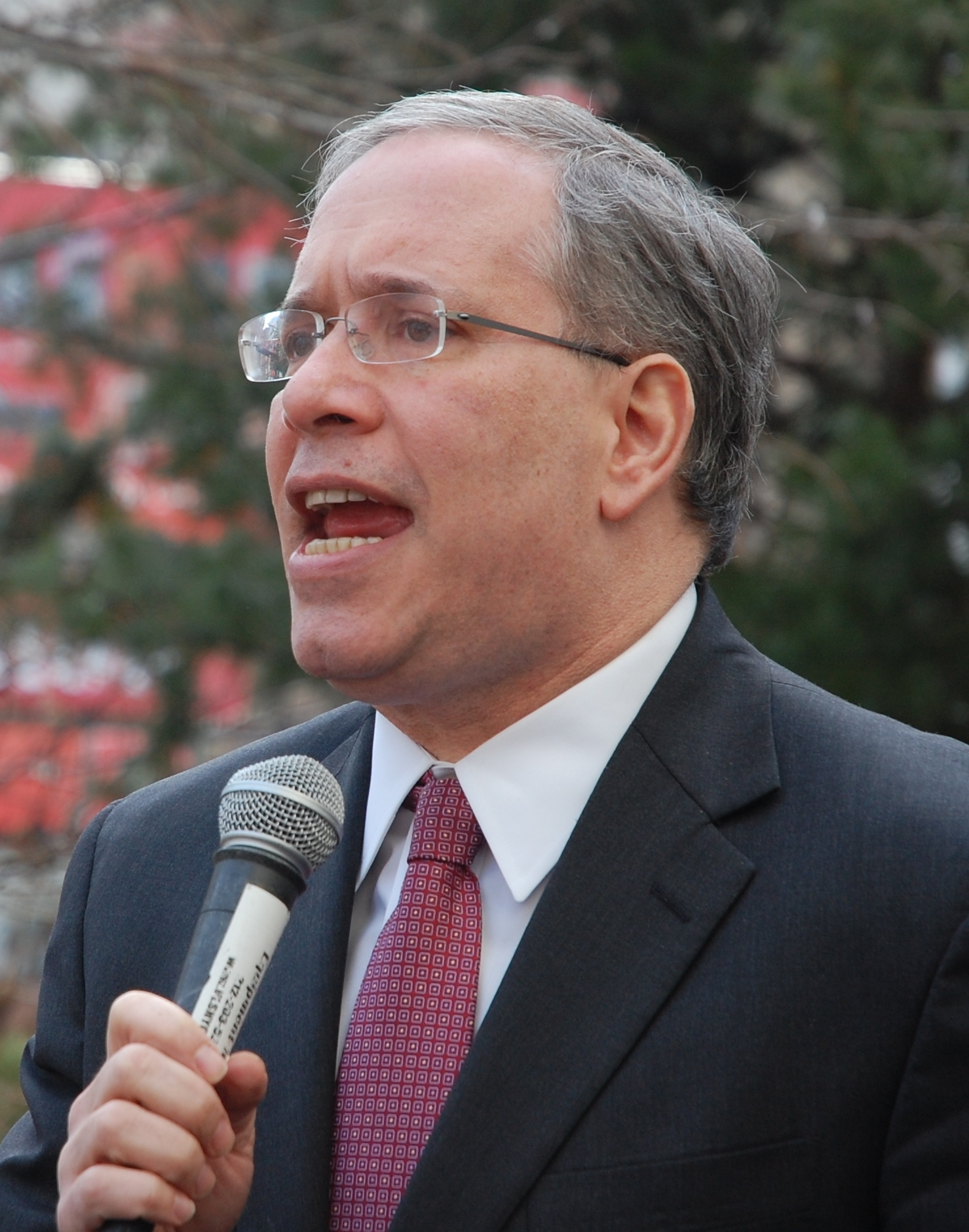

Nominee	Scott Stringer	David Casavis
Party	Democratic	Republican
Alliance	Working Families
Popular vote	195,194	36,879
Percentage	83.02%	15.69%
- State Assembly results Stringer: 60–70% 70–80% 80–90% >90%
President before election
Scott Stringer
Democratic
Elected President
Scott Stringer
Democratic

Incumbent Manhattan Borough President Scott Stringer ran for a second term, having announced his decision on November 6, 2008. Stringer considered a primary challenge to incumbent U.S. Senator Kirsten Gillibrand, but decided to run for reelection in May 2009. The Republican candidate, David Casavis, campaigned on abolishing the office of Borough President.

=== Democratic ===
==== Candidate ====
- Scott Stringer, incumbent Borough President

=== Republican ===
==== Candidate ====
- David Casavis, college professor

=== Minor Third Party ===
Any candidate not among the qualified New York parties had to petition their way onto the ballot; they did not face primary elections.

=== Socialist Worker ===
==== Candidate ====
- Tom Baumann, student

=== General Election ===
Stringer won reelection with 83% of the vote, with Casavis receiving 15.7%.

2009 Manhattan Borough President Election Results
Party	Candidate	Votes	%
Democratic	Scott Stringer	182,798	77.75
Working Families	Scott Stringer	12,396	5.27
Total	Scott Stringer (incumbent)	195,194	83.02
Republican	David B. Casavis	36,879	15.69
Socialist Workers	Tom Baumann	3,029	1.29
Write-in		12	0.01
Total votes		235,114	100.00
Democratic hold			

== Queens ==
2009 Queens presidential election

Nominee	Helen Marshall	Robert Hornak
Party	Democratic	Republican
Alliance	Working Families
Popular vote	180,268	46,695
Percentage	76.30%	19.76%
- State Assembly results Marshall: 60–70% 70–80% 80–90% >90%
President before election
Helen Marshall
Democratic
Elected President
Helen Marshall
Democratic

Incumbent Queens Borough President Helen Marshall ran for a third and final term.

=== Democratic primary ===
==== Candidates ====
- Marc C. Leavitt
- Helen Marshall, incumbent Borough President
- Robert Schwartz, business executive

==== Results ====
2009 Queens Borough President Democratic Primary Results
Party	Candidate	Votes	%
Democratic	Helen M. Marshall	56,114	72.39
Democratic	Marc C. Leavitt	12,871	16.61
Democratic	Robert Schwartz	8,501	10.97
Write-in		25	0.03
Total votes		77,511	100.00

=== Republican ===
==== Candidate ====
- Robert A. Hornak, consultant

=== Major Third Parties ===
Besides the Democratic and Republican parties, the Conservative, Green, Independence and Working Families parties were qualified New York parties. These parties had automatic ballot access.

=== Conservative ===
- Robert Schwartz, business executive (Note: Candidate in the Democratic primary.)

=== General Election ===
Marshall won reelection with 76.3% of the vote, with Hornak receiving 19.8%.

2009 Queens Borough President Election
Party	Candidate	Votes	%
Democratic	Helen M. Marshall	171,088	72.41
Working Families	Helen M. Marshall	9,180	3.89
Total	Helen M. Marshall (incumbent)	180,268	76.30
Republican	Robert A. Hornak	46,695	19.76
Conservative	Robert Schwartz	9,277	3.93
Write-in		23	0.01
Total votes		236,263	100.00
Democratic hold			

== Staten Island ==
2009 Staten Island presidential election
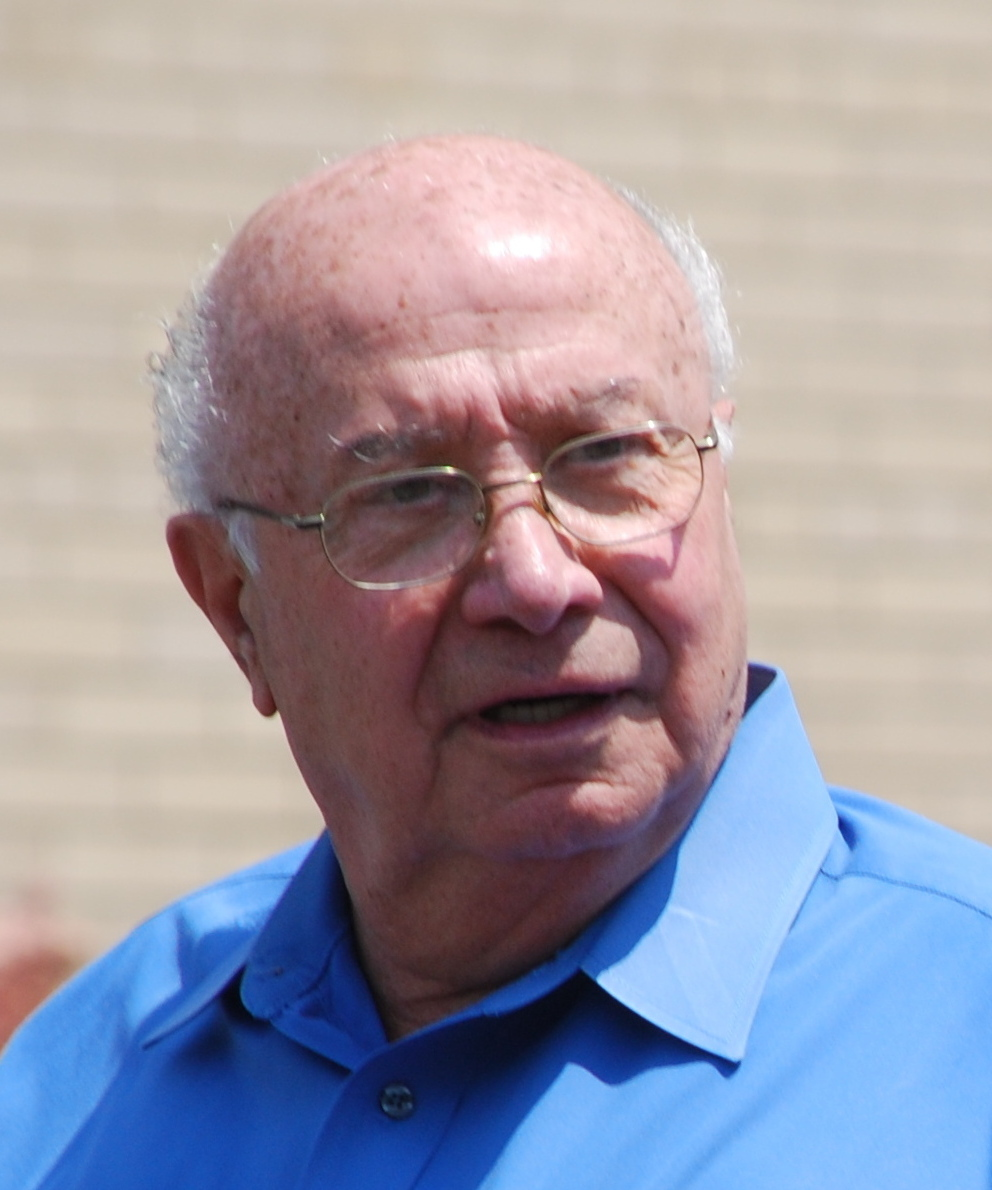

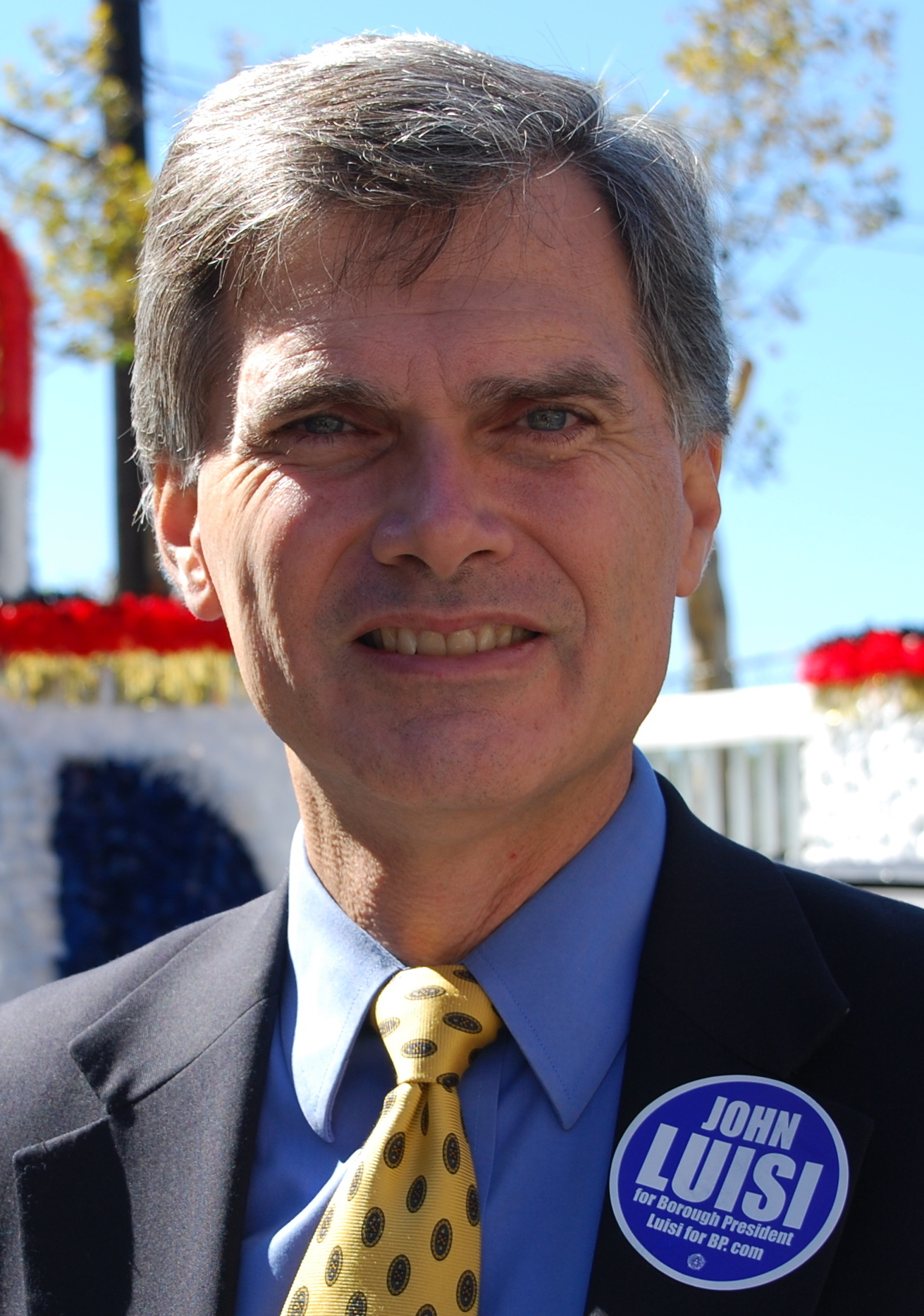
Nominee	James Molinaro	John Luisi
Party	Conservative	Democratic
Alliance	Republican; Independence	Working Families
Popular vote	48,494	28,625
Percentage	62.87%	37.11%
- State Assembly results Molinaro: 60–70% 70–80% Luisi: 50–60%
President before election
James Molinaro
Conservative
Elected President
James Molinaro
Conservative

Incumbent Staten Island Borough President James Molinaro ran for a third and final term.

=== Democratic ===
==== Candidates ====
- John Luisi, attorney

=== Conservative ===
==== Candidates ====
- James Molinaro, incumbent Borough President (Note: Cross-endorsed by the Republican Party and Independence Party.)

=== General Election ===
Molinaro won reelection with 62.9% of the vote, with Luisi receiving 37.1%.

2009 Staten Island Borough President Election
Party	Candidate	Votes	%
Republican	James Molinaro	38,223	49.56
Conservative	James Molinaro	5,493	7.12
Independence	James Molinaro	4,778	6.19
Total	James Molinaro (incumbent)	48,494	62.87
Democratic	John V. Luisi	26,549	34.42
Working Families	John V. Luisi	2,076	2.69
Total	John V. Luisi	28,625	37.11
Write-in		9	0.01
Total votes		77,128	100.00
Conservative hold			
