= Jack Eichenbaum =

Jack Eichenbaum (February 2, 1943 - December 30, 2023) was a tour guide and the Queens, New York official borough historian.

Eichenbaum was born Jacob Eichenbaum on February 2, 1943, to Gertrude Blum and Abraham Eichenbaum.

He earned a PhD in urban geography from the University of Michigan and subsequently taught at Queens and Hunter Colleges in addition to his work for New York City and as a tour guide. Eichenbaum was appointed as borough historian by then Borough President Helen Marshall in 2010 and remained in that role under subsequent Borough Presidents.
