= 1933 New York City borough president elections =

19 New York City borough president elections
- November 7, 1933

Elections were held for New York City's five borough presidencies on November 7, 1933, the same day as aldermanic elections, the aldermanic presidential election, and the mayoral election. Republicans or Fusionists won Queens, Brooklyn, and Richmond, while Democrats retained office in Manhattan and The Bronx. This gave mayor-elect Fiorello H. La Guardia control of the Board of Estimate and Apportionment.
