= 1929 New York City borough president elections =

1901 New York City borough president elections
- November 5, 1901

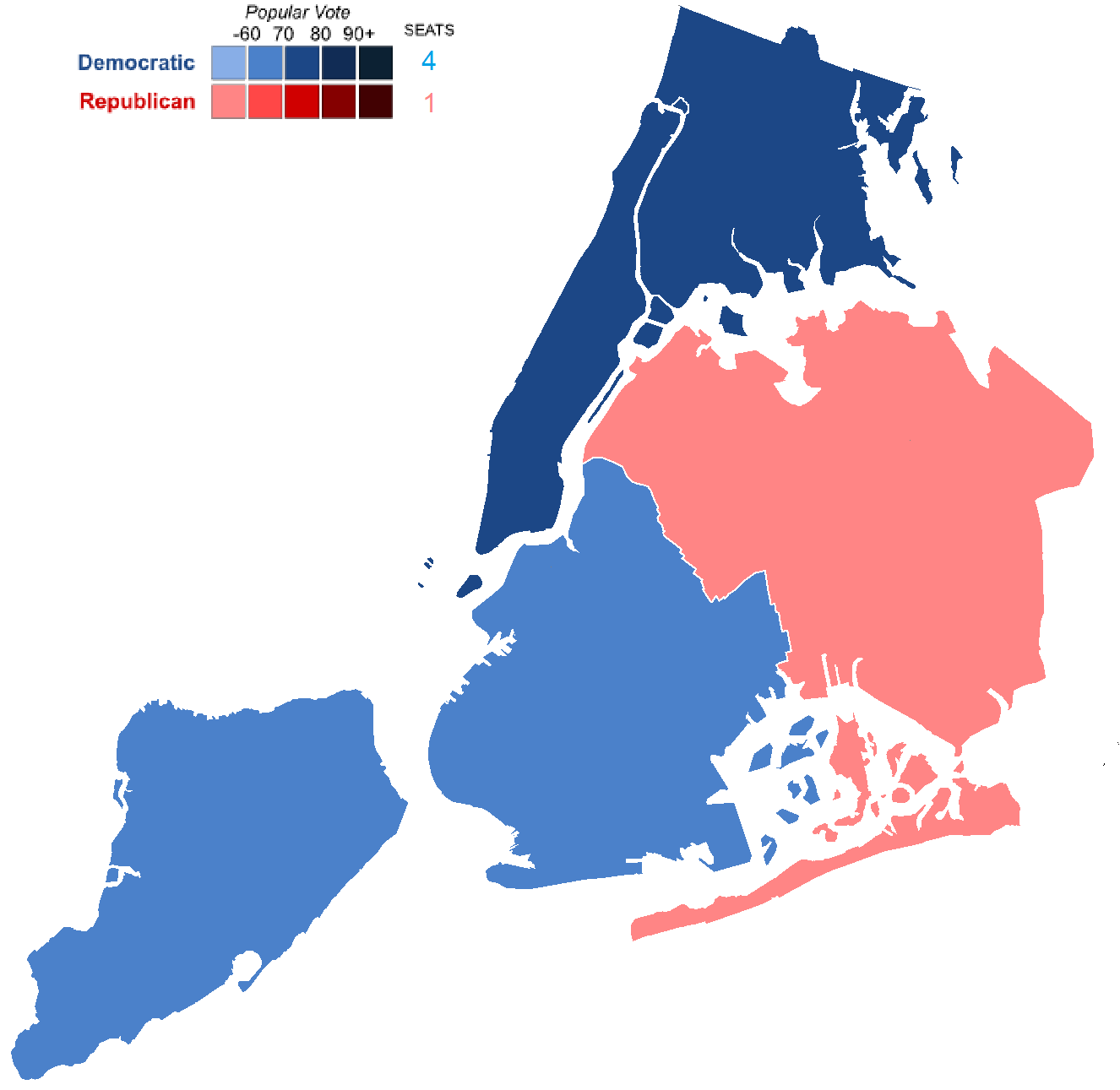
Results by borough.

Elections of New York City's borough presidents were held on November 5, 1929, in concert with such contests as the mayoralty, Comptroller, aldermen, County Sheriffs, Aldermanic Board President, and other miscellaneous questions on the ballot. Democrats were elected in all Boroughs except Queens. This and Democratic victories in other contests were all a part of what was considered "a Crushing Defeat to [the] City G.O.P. [delivered]" by Tammany Hall.

Summary of results by Borough
Borough	Democratic candidate, vote, %	Republican candidate, vote, %
Manhattan	Julius Miller, 237,981, 71.77%	Fay, 93,605, 28.23%
The Bronx	Henry Bruckner, 168,484, 77.52%	Welsch, 48,850, 22.48%
Brooklyn	James J. Byrne, 288,658, 66.71%	Miller, 144,021, 33.29%
Queens	Cox, 116,527, 44.58%	George U. Harvey, 144,852, 55.42%
Richmond	John A. Lynch, 26,167, 68.49%	Allen, 12,040, 31.51%

== Manhattan ==
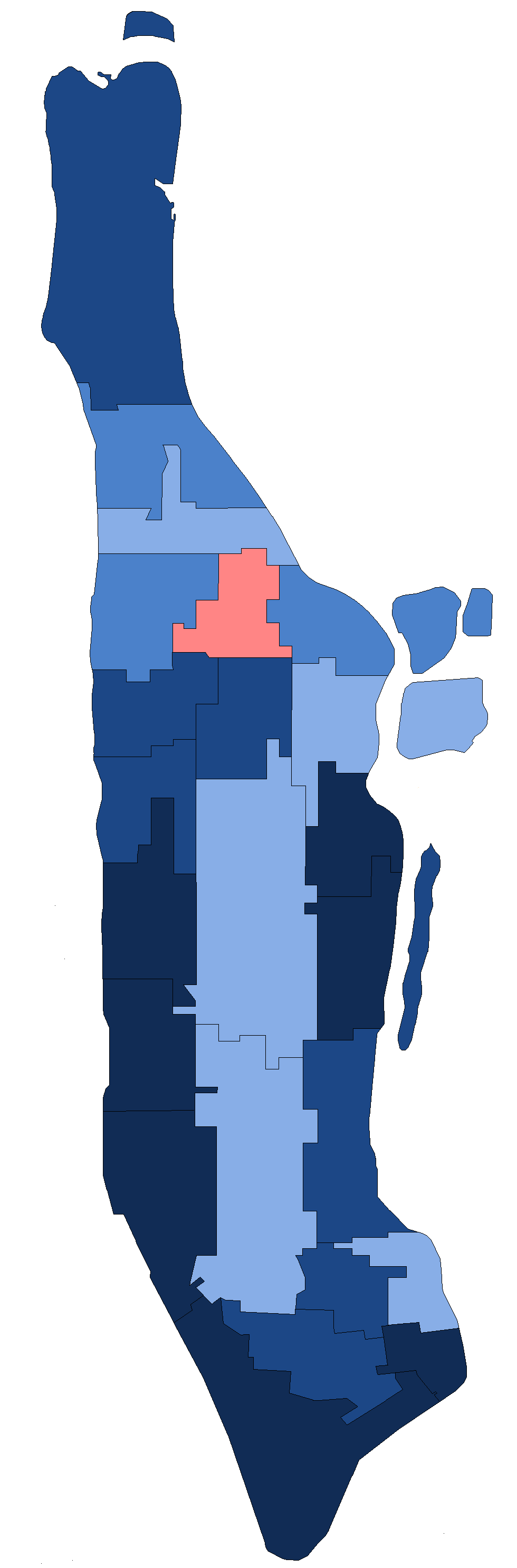
Results by Assembly district, not accounting for rounding

Democratic incumbent Julius Miller defeated Republican challenger Fay.

Result of Manhattan election by Assembly District
Assembly District	Miller, %	Fay, %
1	11,182, 82.70%	2,468, 17.30%
2	9,024, 77.07%	2,685, 22.93%
3	12,944, 80.75%	3,086, 19.25%
4	10,042, 89.59%	1,167, 10.41%
5	13,099, 85%	2,333, 15%
6	6,975, 59%	4,873, 41%
7	13,499, 72%	5,125, 28%
8	6,832, 70%	2,870, 30%
9	14,035, 75%	4,771, 25%
10	7,980, 59%	5,581, 41%
11	12,567, 75%	4,094, 25%
12	13,746, 80%	3,443, 20%
13	8,880, 68%	4,198, 32%
14	12,225, 82%	2,746, 18%
15	9,338, 59%	6,409, 41%
16	12,375, 82%	2,641, 18%
17	6,289, 76%	2,026, 24%
18	8,209, 57%	6,223, 43%
19	5,105, 49%	5,287, 51%
20	5,643, 61%	3,537, 39%
21	6,313, 51%	6,132, 49%
22	9,087, 64%	5,060, 36%
23	21,972, 76%	6,850, 24%
Total	237,981, 71.77%	93,605, 28.23%
