= Philip T. Sica =

American businessman (1934–2021)

Republican/Conservative candidate for Queens Borough President
- Opponent(s): Helen Marshall (D, WF)

Personal details
- Born: September 27, 1934
- Died: September 10, 2021 (aged 86)
- Party: Republican/Conservative
- Other political affiliations: Independence, Right to Life
- Spouse(s): Naomi Sica, Ed.D.
- Occupation: Realtor

Philip Theodore Sica (September 27, 1934 – September 10, 2021) was an American realtor and political activist. He was the President of Wise Choice Realty and, in 2005, made an unsuccessful bid for Queens borough president in New York City. He was the nominee for the Republican and Conservative parties ultimately losing to incumbent Borough President Helen Marshall.

== Early life ==
Sica's earliest education was at St. Stephen's Elementary School. Sica graduated from Cardinal Hayes High School. He then went on to receive a Bachelor of Arts from Pace University (Government and Business), a B.A. from Atlantic Union College (Religion), attended New York Law School, and did religious graduate work with Andrews University.

== Career ==
Sica served New York City in various capacities. He worked in the New York City Department of Hospitals, which is now called the Department of Health and Mental Hygiene. He was a senior investigator for the New York City Department of Finance, a NYC Housing Authority Assistant, a detective-investigator for the Queens County District Attorney's Office, and Marshal for the City (mayoral appointment). In 1980, Sica's career changed when he became a minister of various Seventh-day Adventist Churches in the city.

Prior to running for borough president, Sica ran for the State Assembly's 24th district in 2000, and lost to Mark Weprin (72% to 28%). Sica then went on to run for Council District 23 in 2001 and lost to David Weprin (Mark's brother) 69% to 31%. During his run for the Council District, Sica outlined his wishes to promote a reduction in crime, the lowering of taxes, and reform of the city's education system through increased investment by the state. In the race for the State Assembly, Sica received the support of the Republican Party, the Conservative Party, and the Right to Life. In his 2001 bid for the City Council, he was additionally endorsed by the Independence Party.

Sica was unopposed for the Republican and Conservative parties' nomination in the race for Queens Borough President. Additionally, Borough President Helen Marshall ran unopposed for the nomination of the Democratic and Working Families parties.

After counting the absentee ballots and affidavit ballots cast either for Marshall or Sica, the result turned out to be seventy-five percent for Marshall and twenty-five percent for Sica. Sica's strongest assembly district was A.D. 23 (comprising Howard Beach, Ozone Park, and Far Rockaway) where he garnered 39% of the votes cast.

Sica was active in the American Legion, having served in the Army's Military Police. On September 18, 2007, Philip T. Sica was elected to continue representing the Republicans of the 24th Assembly District in the New York Republican State Committee. In October 2007, Philip T. Sica was elected to be a Vice-Chairman of the Queens County Republican Party and is again serving as its Chaplain.

== Death ==
Sica died in his sleep on September 10, 2021, at the age of 86. He was survived by his wife, Naomi, as well as four children and four grandchildren.

== Electoral history ==
Queens Borough President (General Election)
| Year | Candidate | Party | Votes | Pct | Opponent | Party | Votes | Pct |
| 2005 | Philip T. Sica | Republican, Conservative | 60,607 | 25% | Helen Marshall (inc.) | Democrat, Working Families | 179,992 | 75% |

Party political offices
| Preceded by Al C. Stabile | Republican Party Borough Presidential candidate 2005 | Succeeded by Robert Hornak |
| Preceded by Al C. Stabile | Conservative Party Borough Presidential candidate 2005 | Succeeded by Robert Hornak |
