= 1897 New York City borough president elections =

- November 2, 1897

Elections for New York City's borough presidents were held on November 2, 1897. The City of Greater New York, as the newly enlarged New York City was colloquially known, had been created from what had been New York City, Richmond County, Kings County (then coterminous with the City of Brooklyn), and the western part of Queens County. The city was then divided into five boroughs, which each elected a borough president every four years.

Democrats won the presidencies of all five boroughs, as well as the mayoralty, Comptroller, and Council President of the new city.
