= Brian Ellner =

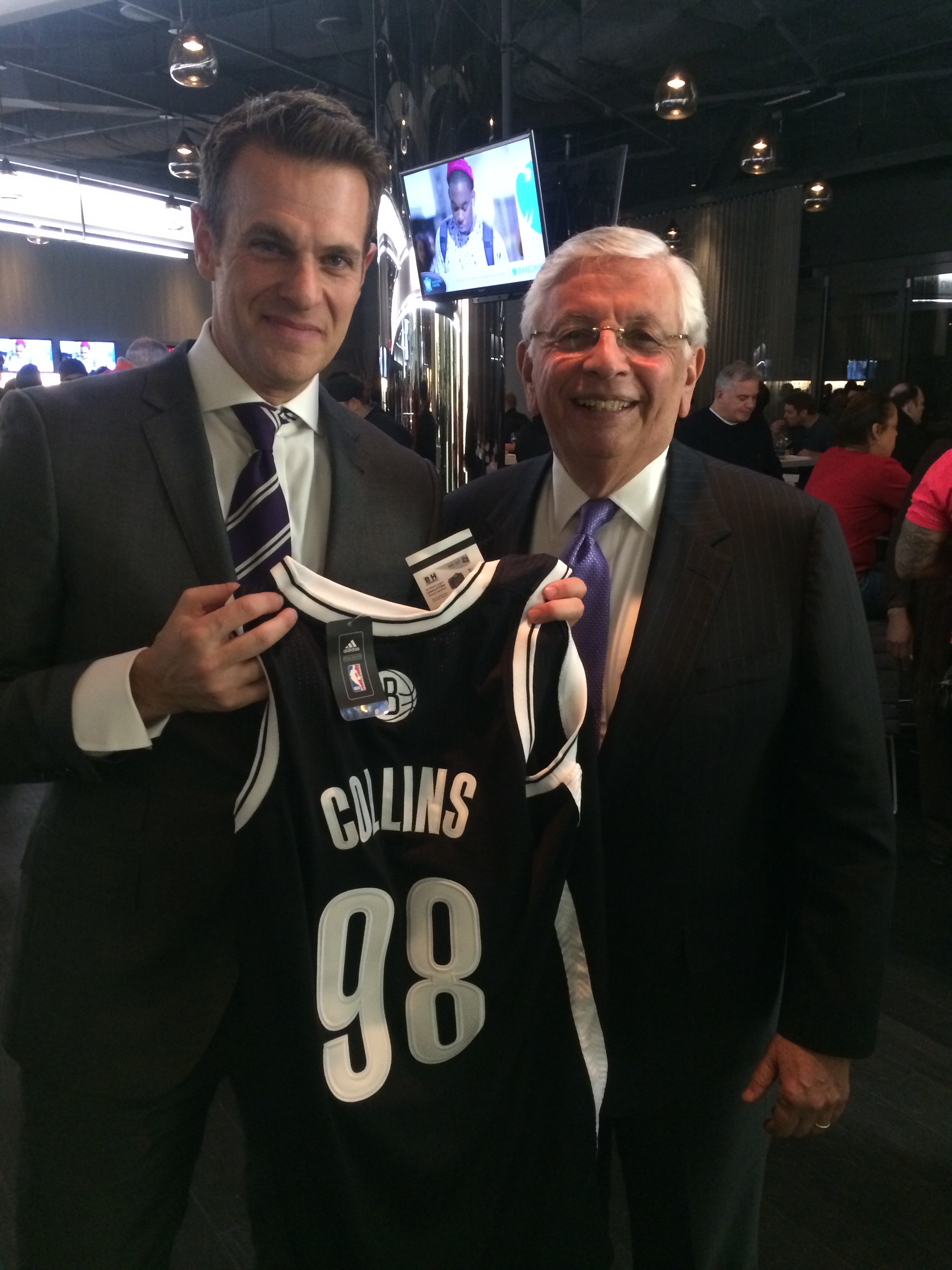
- Brian Ellner and NBA Commissioner David Stern
- Education: Dartmouth College; Harvard Law School
- Occupations: LGBT activist and political strategist, Head of U.S. Corporate Practice (BCW)
- Known for: New Yorker Same-sex Marriage Campaign
- Board member of: Athlete Ally

Brian Ellner is an LGBT rights activist, media and political strategist. He was formerly the executive vice president for public affairs at Edelman in New York and currently leads BCW's U.S. corporate practice, in addition to his role as US Public Affairs lead for WPP, a leading global marketing communications company.” He was the architect of two successful pro-gay marriage campaigns, TheFour2012 and New Yorkers for Marriage Equality. His efforts were considered instrumental to the 2011 passage of the Marriage Equality Act in New York. He serves on the board of directors of Athlete Ally and is widely referenced in the LGBTQ sports movement. In 2014, he founded a global campaign for the Sochi Olympics to feature Russia's anti-LGBTQIA + laws. In June 2022, Brian was named one of the Crains' New York business notable LGBTQ leaders and was ranked 30 of 100 of city's state magazines 2022 Pride Power List. Brian Ellner married Jarrett Olivo, Director of Global Marketing for Tiffany & Company on October 2, 2021, in Manhattan.

== See also ==
- LGBT culture in New York City
- List of LGBT people from New York City
- NYC Pride March
