= 1901 New York City borough president elections =

- November 5, 1901

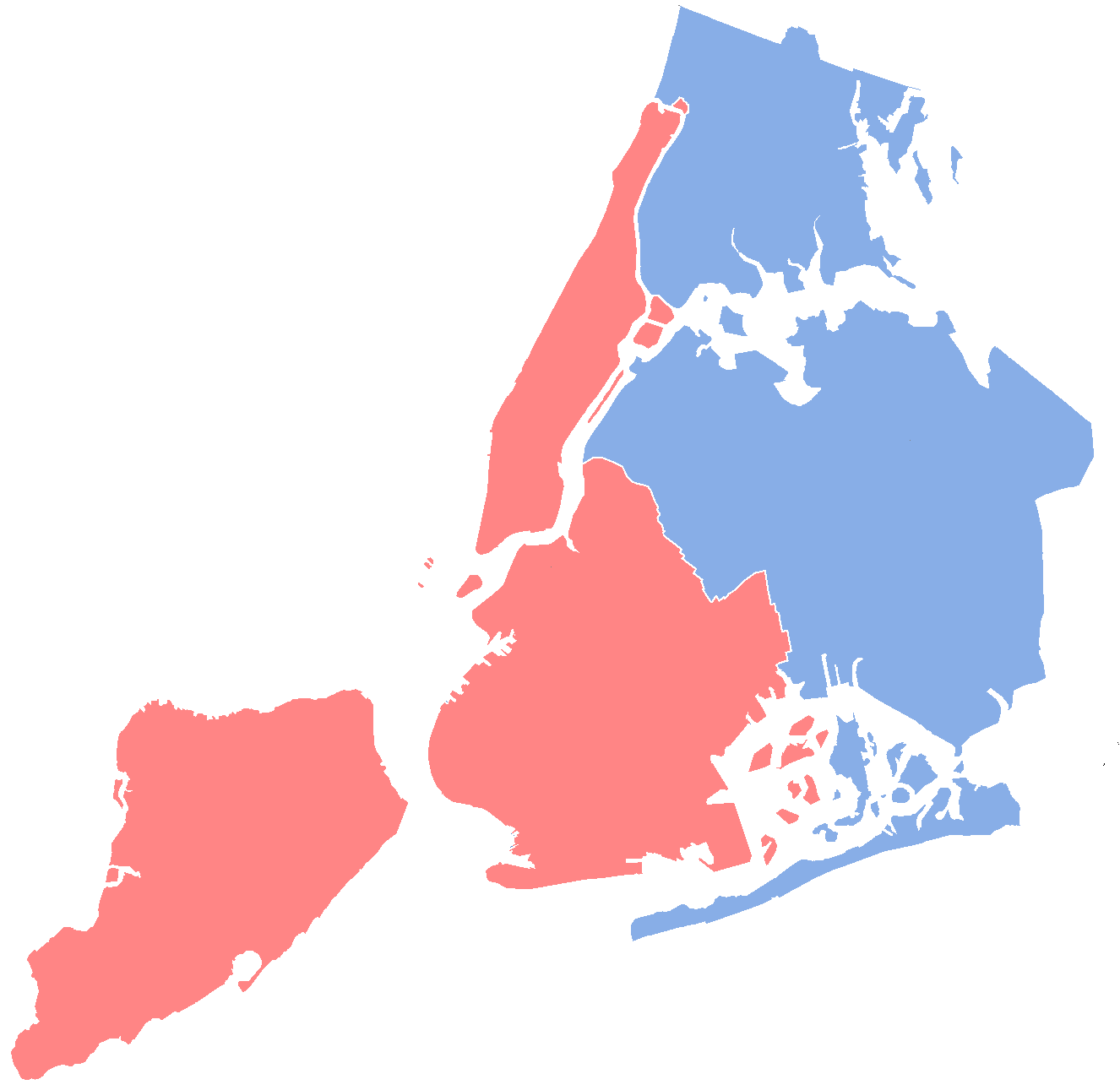
Results by borough. Fusion/Republican 50–60% Democratic 50–60%

Elections were held to elect the borough presidents of New York City on November 5, 1901. Fusionists and Republicans won three of the city's five boroughs while Democrats were returned in The Bronx and Queens.

Summary of results by Borough
Borough	Democratic candidate, vote, %	Fusion/Republican candidate, vote, %
Manhattan	Fromme, 129,257, 48.06%	Jacob A. Cantor, 139,685, 51.94%
The Bronx	Louis F. Haffen, 19,509, 51.96%	Wells, 18,039, 48.04%
Brooklyn	Driggs, 93,392, 46.24%	J. Edward Swanstrom, 108,559, 53.76%
Queens (Note: Tallies account for Citizens' Union candidate Lawrence, who received 1,952 votes for 7.26%.)	Joseph Cassidy, 14,437, 53.72%	Doht, 10,484, 39.01%
Richmond	Muller, 6,160, 48.17%	George Cromwell, 6,628, 51.83%
