= Anthony Ribustello =

American actor and politician (died 2019)

- Born: Anthony J. Ribustello; August 6, 1966
- Died: December 28, 2019 (aged 53); New York City, U.S.
- Occupations: Actor, politician
- Employer: New York City Board of Elections
- Known for: Dante Greco on The Sopranos
- Political party: Republican

Anthony J. Ribustello was an American actor and politician. He was best known for his role as Dante Greco, Tony Soprano's driver on the HBO series The Sopranos. A member of the Republican Party, Ribustello was the party's nominee for Bronx Borough President in 2009, losing to Democratic Assemblyman Rubén Díaz Jr., who subsequently appointed him to Bronx Community Board 10.

== Career ==
In April 2009, Ribustello ran for Bronx borough president as the Republican candidate in a special election to replace incumbent Democrat Adolfo Carrión Jr., who resigned to take a position in the Obama administration. Ribustello received about 13 percent of the vote in the overwhelmingly Democratic borough, losing to Democratic Assemblyman Rubén Díaz Jr. After the election, Diaz appointed Ribustello to Bronx Community Board 10.

In addition to acting, Ribustello was also employed at the New York City Board of Elections.

== Death ==
Ribustello died on December 28, 2019 at the age of 53, after years of waiting for a kidney transplant.

== Filmography ==
=== Film ===
Year	Title	Role	Notes
1991	Poison	Fontenal Inmate	
1992	Fathers & Sons	Chris	
1995	No Exit	Goombie	
1999	Under Hellgate Bridge	Vincent's Crew	
2003	Uptown Girls	Tony	
2003	Anything Else	Car Thug #1	
2005	Be Cool	Fast Freddie	
2008	A Jersey Christmas	John	
2010	Bronx Paradise	Dante Greco	
2012	The History of Future Folk	Cop #2	
2013	Side Effects	Desk Sergeant	Uncredited

=== Television ===
Year	Title	Role	Notes
1996–1997	The City	Vito	16 episodes
1999	Sex and the City	Large Imposing Man	Episode: "La Douleur Exquise!"
2001	Deadline	Al	Episode: "Somebody's Fool"
2002	Law & Order: Special Victims Unit	Fast Food Manager	Episode: "Protection"
2002, 2009	Law & Order	Paul Upton / Hank	2 episodes
2004	Ed	Mitch Martel	Episode: "Happily Ever After"
2004–2007	The Sopranos	Dante Greco	11 episodes
2004	Bad Apple	Stanley	Television film
2007	The Knights of Prosperity	Drunk Guy	Episode: "Operation: Fighting Shape"
2008	Law & Order: Criminal Intent	Tony Snails	Episode: "Contract"
2012	Magic City	Jilly Rizzo	Episode: "The Year of the Fin"
