= James Molinaro =

American politician

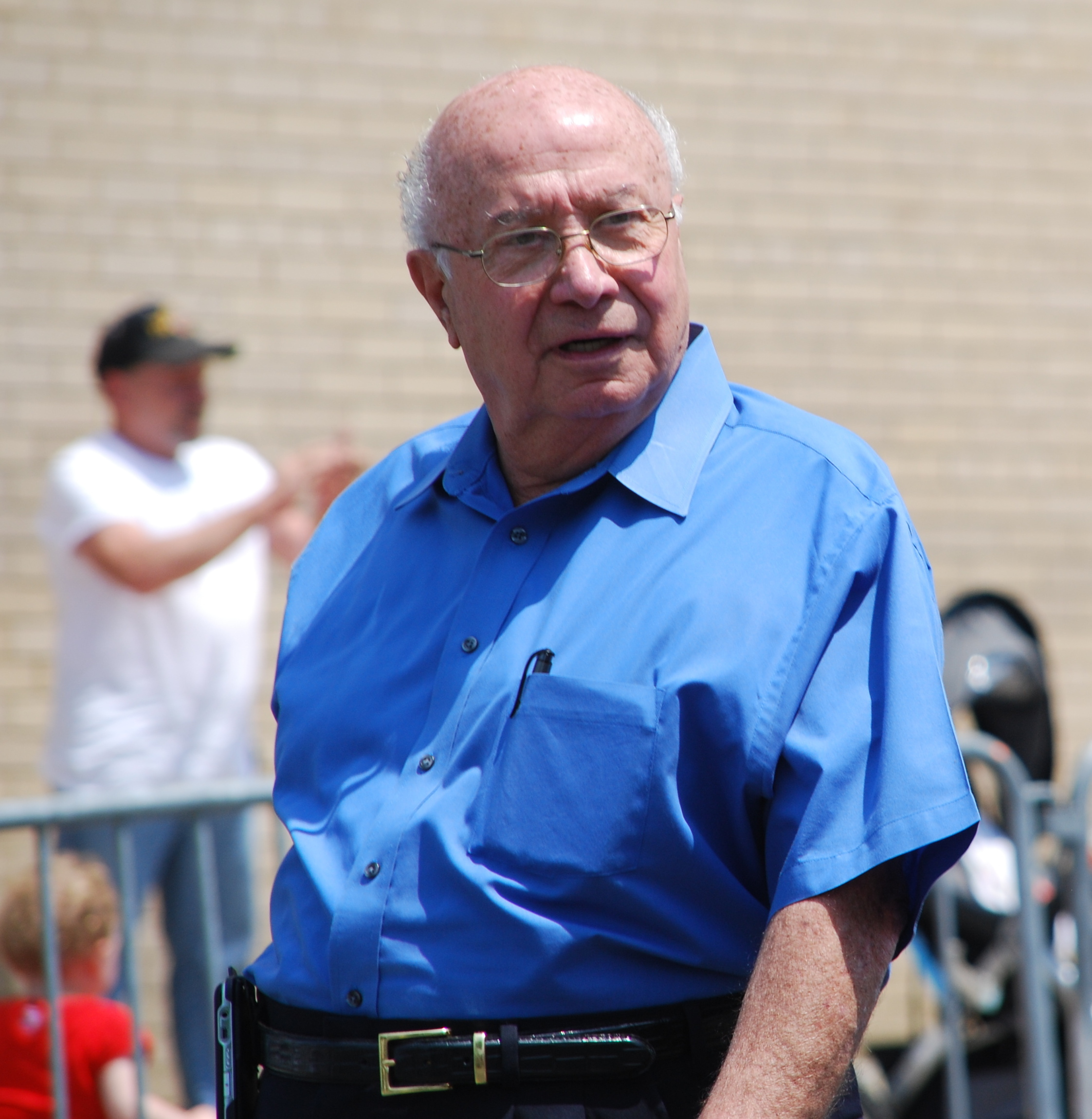
- Molinaro in 2009

14th Borough President of Staten Island
- In office January 1, 2002 – December 31, 2013
- Preceded by: Guy Molinari
- Succeeded by: James Oddo

Deputy Borough President of Staten Island
- In office January 1, 1990 – December 31, 2001
- Preceded by: Nicholas LaPorte
- Succeeded by: Dan Donovan

Personal details
- Born: March 11, 1931 (age 95) Manhattan, New York, U.S.
- Party: Conservative
- Spouse: Carol (m. 1962; died 1990)
- Children: 2
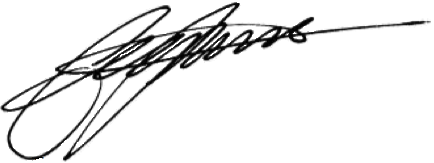
- Signature

James P. Molinaro (born March 11, 1931) is an American politician and a former borough president of Staten Island.

Molinaro first won the election as borough president of Staten Island on November 6, 2001, defeating his Democratic opponent Councilman Jerome X. O'Donovan, with 50 percent of the vote to 43 percent. He took office on January 1, 2002.

Molinaro won re-election for a third and last term on November 3, 2009, with 46,061 votes (62.7%) compared to 27,356 (37.3%) votes for his challenger John Luisi, who had also challenged him in 2005.

== Personal life ==
Molinaro was born on the Lower East Side of Manhattan to Italian immigrants. He has three brothers and two sisters and has lived in the Staten Island neighborhood of Fort Wadsworth since 1964.

He is a widower since 1990 when his wife of 28 years, Carol, died of complications relating to scleroderma. The couple had two sons, Peter and Steven.

== Career ==
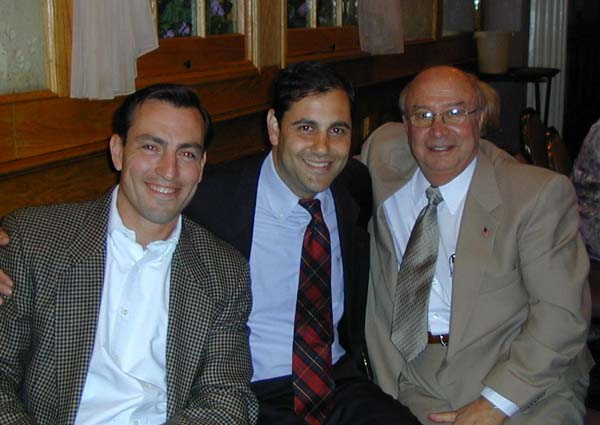
Molinaro with Vito Fossella and Andrew Lanza in 2004

His political career began in 1964 when he joined the New York State Conservative Party. In 1976, he was elected as Chairman of the Richmond County Conservative Party and subsequently as Vice Chair of the State Party. In 1989, he was elected Executive Vice Chair of the New York State Conservative Party, a post he still holds today.

Molinaro served for 12 years as deputy borough president to former Borough President Guy V. Molinari. He also served as chief of staff to Molinari when the latter was a congressman representing New York's 14th Congressional District. Molinaro has had two deputy borough presidents while in office. His first was Daniel M. Donovan, Jr., who left to become the Richmond County District Attorney in January 2004 after winning election to that office the previous November. The deputy post was left vacant until November 2006. After much speculation, Molinaro named Ed Burke to the deputy position. Ed Burke had been executive assistant to Guy V. Molinari for twelve years and to Molinaro for nearly five.

Over a 20-year period, he has served on the board of directors for the Veterans Memorial Sports Complex, Staten Island Community Television, New York State Regional Organ Transplant and Bayley Seton Hospital. He was also the chairman of the St. Elizabeth Ann's Health and Rehabilitation Center which he helped to create.

In 1989, Molinaro also helped to establish Staten Island’s first AIDS day care center and AIDS medical care facility.

Currently, Molinaro serves on the board of the Heart Institute of Staten Island, a cardiac care facility. He is also on the board of the Sisters of Charity Health Care Corporation. Molinaro also serves as a Senior Advisor to the law firm of Pitta & Baione LLP, who assist 9/11 victims in getting the compensation they deserve. In 1991, in memory of his late wife, Molinaro helped dedicate a local dialysis unit in her name. In 2000 St. Elizabeth Ann's Health and Rehabilitation Center opened the James P. and Carol E. Molinaro Health Care and Rehabilitation Center Atrium.

In 2012, Molinaro called Stephani Germanotta (professionally known as Lady Gaga) a "slut" after a photo of her smoking a joint of marijuana during a concert in Amsterdam was published, receiving widespread backlash.

Molinaro has been critical of how Italian-Americans and Staten Island residents are both portrayed in the media. In 2010, he penned the introduction of Andrew Paul Mele's Italian Staten Island (Images of America).

== Accomplishments ==
=== Overdevelopment ===
Reacting to the development pressure threatening the character of Staten Island, Molinaro spearheaded the largest NIMBY down zoning on Staten Island in more than 40 years. It affected more than 41,459 individual properties on 4,554 acres (18.43 km^{2}). Ultimately, this NIMBY down zoning has reduced the total number of potential new homes on Staten Island, by 25%.

=== Parks ===
Since entering Borough Hall, Molinaro has aided in the allotment of nearly 100 million dollars to Park acquisition and maintenance. The renaissance of the South Beach Boardwalk, new recreational fields, an expansion of the Blue Belt, and a quarter-mile-long fishing pier are just some of the parks related activities that have benefited from his capital funding. Currently, 25 percent of Staten Island has protected Parkland, a higher percentage than any other borough. Molinaro is a self-identified environmentalist.

=== Economic development ===
Molinaro was instrumental in bringing Visy Paper to Staten Island in 1997. The company, a subsidiary of Australian-owned Pratt Industries, created hundreds of new jobs when it opened its cardboard recycling facility on Victory Boulevard near the Arthur Kill, representing the largest single investment in manufacturing in New York City in the last 50 years. Molinaro was also involved in the 2007 restoration of a freight rail service, linking Staten Island to the rest of the nation by rail for the first time in 16 years.

=== Education ===
Molinaro has allotted $500,000 from his capital budget to purchase Wireless laptop computers for all of Staten Island’s Intermediate schools as well as many elementary schools. He has also worked closely with Mayor Michael Bloomberg to bring additional schools to Staten Island including P.S. 58 (opened in 2003) and I.S. (scheduled to open in 2007).

Molinaro has also allocated $1,000,000 from Staten Island's capital budget for "electronic" blackboards for each public school on Staten Island.

== Current initiatives ==
=== Wind turbines ===
Although an advocate for urban parks and Fresh Kills Park itself, Molinaro has butted heads with the New York City Department of Parks and Recreation over their refusal to consider the construction of wind turbines for renewable energy on the site.

New York City Mayor Michael R. Bloomberg, a Molinaro ally, also holds an opinion that the former landfill is a place where renewable energy should be generated but prefers the installation of a photovoltaic system instead.

=== Landfill roadways ===
Molinaro has also butted heads with the New York City Department of Parks and Recreation over their refusal to open up currently unused former New York City Department of Sanitation roads within the landfill. Molinaro believes that with the opening of these roads, congestion around the Richmond Avenue commercial district, which includes the Staten Island Mall would be alleviated.

In the past, his predecessor Guy V. Molinari, and former New York State Assemblyman Eric Nicholas Vitaliano also held an opinion that the roads should be opened.

In April 2011, the New York City Department of Parks and Recreation announced that it would construct a bicycle and pedestrian path along the park's eastern border.

Political offices
Preceded by Nicholas LaPorte	Deputy Borough President of Staten Island; 1990-2001	Succeeded by Daniel M. Donovan, Jr.
Preceded by Guy Molinari	Borough President of Staten Island; 2002-2013	Succeeded by James Oddo
