= Helen M. Marshall =

American politician (1929–2017)

Helen Marshall
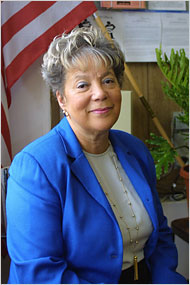

18th Borough President of Queens
- In office January 1, 2002 – January 1, 2014
- Preceded by: Claire Shulman
- Succeeded by: Melinda Katz

Member of the New York City Council from the 21st district
- In office January 1, 1992 – December 31, 2001
- Preceded by: Walter McCaffrey
- Succeeded by: Hiram Monserrate

Member of the New York State Assembly from the 35th district
- In office January 5, 1983 – December 31, 1991
- Preceded by: John G. LoPresto
- Succeeded by: Jeffrion L. Aubry

Personal details
- Born: September 30, 1929 The Bronx, New York, U.S.
- Died: March 4, 2017 (aged 87) Palm Desert, California, U.S.
- Party: Democratic
- Spouse: Donald Marshall
- Children: 2
- Education: Queens College

Helen Marie Marshall (née Sargent; September 30, 1929 – March 4, 2017) was an American politician from New York City. She was Borough President of Queens from 2002-2013. She was also the first African-American Borough President of Queens.

== Biography ==
Marshall was born on September 30, 1929, in the Bronx, having been raised in between both Harlem and the Bronx. Both of her parents were immigrants of African descent from British Guiana (now Guyana).

She graduated with a B.A. in education from CUNY Queens College. She was a teacher for eight years. In 1969, she left teaching to become the first Director of the Langston Hughes Library in Queens. She was married to Donald Edward Marshall until his death; they had two children, Donald Jr. and Agnes Marie. She entered politics as a Democrat. She was a member of the New York State Assembly for eight years and a member of the New York City Council for ten.

She was elected as Borough President of Queens in November 2001, to succeed the term-limited Claire Shulman. As Borough President, Marshall made marketing Queens as a tourist destination one of her priorities. In 2005, she won a second term, defeating her Republican/Conservative challenger Philip T. Sica with 75% of the vote to his 25%. She was inaugurated to her second term as President of the Borough of Queens on January 3, 2006, in a ceremony held at Terrace on the Park in Flushing Meadows Corona Park. Marshall outlined her plans for the next four years including health care, education, housing and new park projects. In November 2009, Marshall was re-elected to a third term.

In 2017, P.S. 330 was renamed the Helen M. Marshall School to honor her legacy.

== Death ==
Marshall died on March 4, 2017, at her home in Palm Desert, California, aged 87. A widow, she was survived by her two children.

New York State Assembly
Preceded by John G. Lopresto	New York State Assembly; 35th district 1983–1991	Succeeded by Jeffrion L. Aubry
New York City Council
Preceded by Walter McCaffrey	New York City Council; 21st district 1992–2001	Succeeded by Hiram Monserrate
Political offices
Preceded by Claire Shulman	Borough President of Queens; 2002–2013	Succeeded by Melinda Katz
