= 2001 New York City borough president elections =

- November 6, 2001
	Majority party	Minority party	Third party
Party	Democratic	Republican	Conservative
Seats before	4	1	0
Seats won	4	0	1
Seat change	Steady	1▼	1▲
Popular vote	801,435	222,362	60,397
Percentage	70.69% (Note: Totals may be combined with that of other parties who cross-endorsed Democratic Party candidates via electoral fusion.)	19.61% (Note: Totals may be combined with that of other parties who cross-endorsed Republican Party candidates via electoral fusion.)	5.33% (Note: Totals may be combined with that of other parties who cross-endorsed Conservative Party candidates via electoral fusion.)
- Results: Conservative gain Democratic hold

The 2001 New York City borough president elections were held on November 6, 2001, to elect the presidents of each of the five boroughs in New York City. They coincided with other city elections, including for mayor, comptroller, public advocate, and city council. Primary elections were originally held on September 11, but due to the September 11 attacks were postponed to September 25, 2001 (votes cast on September 11 were not counted).

The winning candidates were as follows:

- The Bronx: Adolfo Carrión Jr., New York City Council member (Democratic)
- Brooklyn: Marty Markowitz, New York State Senate member (Democratic)
- Manhattan: C. Virginia Fields, incumbent borough president (Democratic)
- Queens: Helen Marshall, New York City Council member (Democratic)
- Staten Island: James Molinaro, deputy borough president (Conservative)

== Overview ==
Borough	Democratic		Republican		Others		Total		Result
Borough	Votes	%	Votes	%	Votes	%	Votes	%	Result
The Bronx	108,680	79.32%	23,007	16.79%	5,327	3.89%	137,014	100.0%	Democratic hold
Brooklyn	225,093	76.45%	47,187	16.03%	22,151	7.52%	294,431	100.0%	Democratic hold
Manhattan	227,929	72.85%	64,156	20.50%	20,800	6.65%	312,885	100.0%	Democratic hold
Queens	193,970	67.99%	88,012	30.85%	3,326	1.17%	285,308	100.0%	Democratic hold
Staten Island	45,763	43.98%	N/A	N/A	58,281	56.02%	104,044	100.0%	Conservative gain
Total	801,435	70.69%	222,362	19.61%	109,885	9.69%	1,133,682	100.0%	

== The Bronx ==
2001 Bronx presidential election

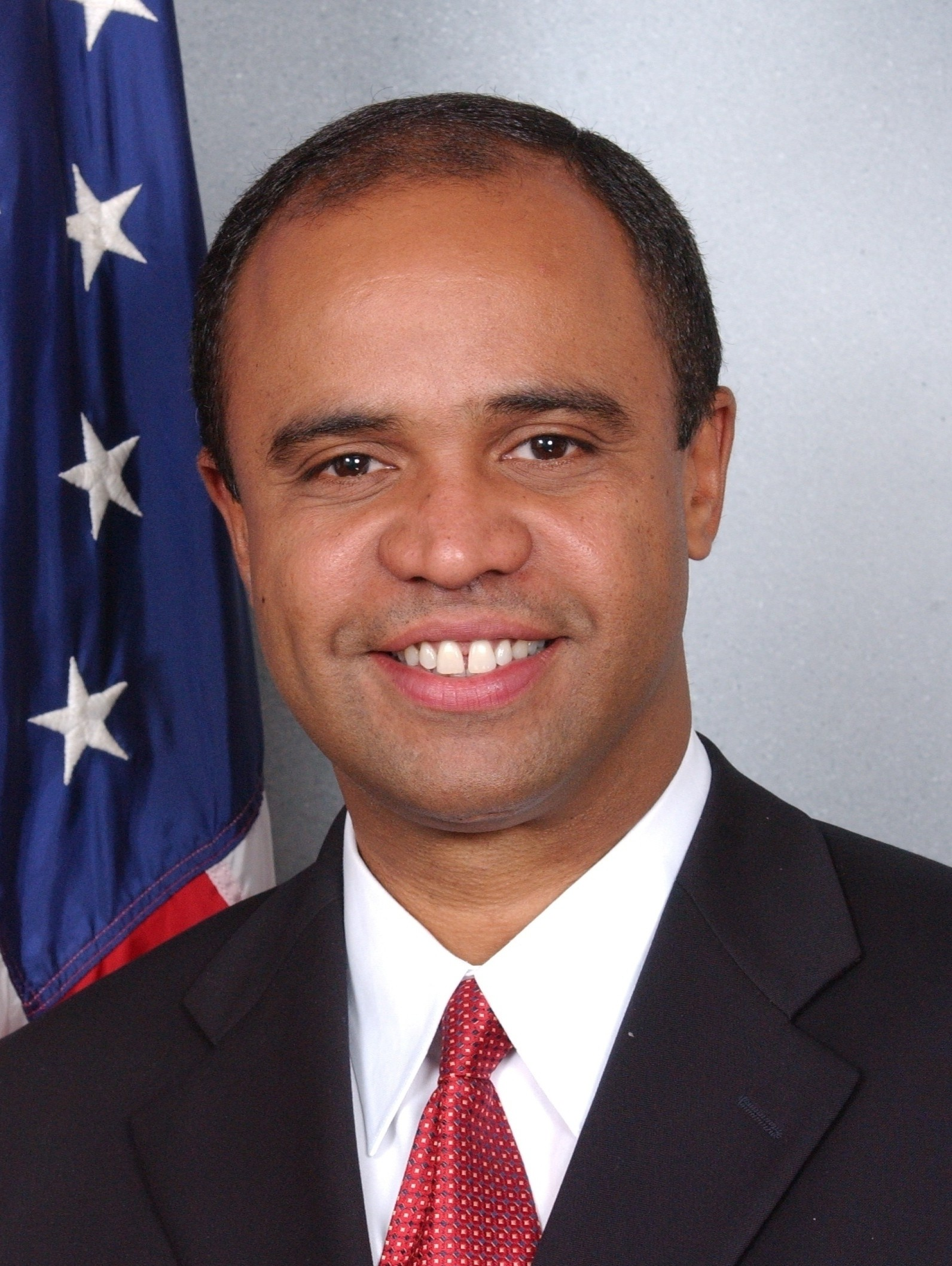

Nominee	Adolfo Carrión Jr.	Aaron Justice
Party	Democratic	Republican
Alliance	Working Families
Popular vote	108,680	23,007
Percentage	79.32%	16.79%
- State Assembly results Carrión: 60–70% 80–90% >90%
President before election
Fernando Ferrer
Democratic
Elected President
Adolfo Carrión Jr.
Democratic

Incumbent Bronx Borough President Fernando Ferrer was ineligible to run for another term and ran for mayor of New York City in the Democratic primary.

=== Democratic primary ===
==== Candidates ====
- Adolfo Carrión Jr., New York City Councilmember
- Pedro Espada Jr., former New York State Senate member
- June M. Eisland, New York City Councilmember

==== Results ====
2001 Bronx Borough President Democratic Primary Results
Party	Candidate	Votes	%
Democratic	Adolfo Carrión Jr.	48,913	40.79
Democratic	Pedro Espada Jr.	44,124	36.80
Democratic	June M. Eisland	26,815	22.36
Write-in		57	0.05
Total votes		119,909	100.00

=== Republican ===
==== Candidate ====
- Aaron Justice

=== Minor Third Parties ===
Besides the Democratic and Republican parties, the Conservative, Green, Independence and Working Families parties were qualified New York parties. These parties had automatic ballot access.

=== Conservative ===
==== Candidate ====
- Kevin Brawley, consultant and chair of the Bronx Conservative Party

=== Liberal ===
==== Candidate ====
- Ronald Law

=== General Election ===
Carrión won the election with 79.3% of the vote, with Justice receiving 16.8%.

2001 Bronx Borough President Election
Party	Candidate	Votes	%
Democratic	Adolfo Carrión Jr.	102,090	74.51
Working Families	Adolfo Carrión Jr.	6,590	4.81
Total	Adolfo Carrión Jr.	108,680	79.32
Republican	Aaron Justice	23,007	16.79
Conservative	Kevin Brawley	3,131	2.29
Liberal	Ronald Law	2,183	1.59
Write-in		13	0.01
Total votes		137,014	100.00
Democratic hold			

== Brooklyn ==
2001 Brooklyn presidential election

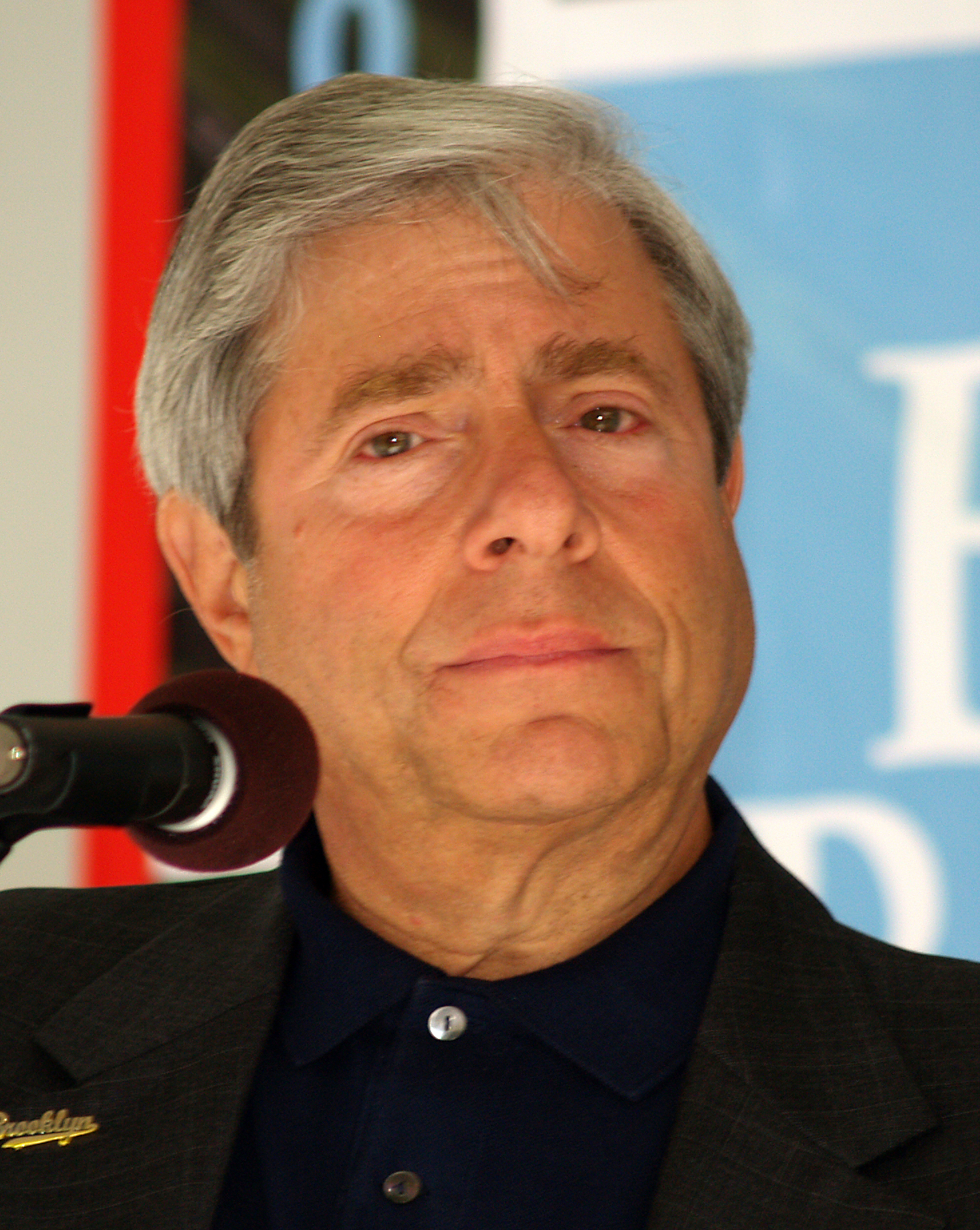

Nominee	Marty Markowitz	Lori Sue Maslow
Party	Democratic	Republican
Popular vote	225,093	47,187
Percentage	76.45%	16.03%
- State Assembly results Markowitz: 50–60% 60–70% 70–80% 80–90% >90%
President before election
Howard Golden
Democratic
Elected President
Marty Markowitz
Democratic

Incumbent Brooklyn Borough President Howard Golden was ineligible to run for another term. Golden endorsed Deputy Borough President Jeannette Gadson in the Democratic primary.

=== Democratic primary ===
==== Candidates ====
- Kenneth K. Fisher
- Jeannette Gadson, deputy borough president
- Marty Markowitz, New York State Senate member

==== Results ====
2001 Brooklyn Borough President Democratic Primary Results
Party	Candidate	Votes	%
Democratic	Marty Markowitz	79,443	39.63
Democratic	Jeannette Gadson	67,329	33.58
Democratic	Kenneth K. Fisher	53,703	26.79
Write-in		1	0.00
Total votes		200,476	100.00

=== Republican ===
==== Candidate ====
- Lori Sue Maslow

=== Minor Third Parties ===
Besides the Democratic and Republican parties, the Conservative, Green, Independence and Working Families parties were qualified New York parties. These parties had automatic ballot access.

=== Conservative ===
==== Candidate ====
- Robert Maresca

=== Green ===
==== Candidate ====
- Paulo A. Nunes-Ueno

=== Liberal ===
==== Candidate ====
- Kenneth K. Fisher (Note: Ran in the Democratic primary.)

=== General Election ===
Markowitz won the election with 76.5% of the vote, with Maslow receiving 16%.

2001 Brooklyn Borough President Election
Party	Candidate	Votes	%
Democratic	Marty Markowitz	225,093	76.45
Republican	Lori Sue Maslow	47,187	16.03
Liberal	Kenneth K. Fisher	11,544	3.92
Conservative	Robert Maresca	5,749	1.95
Green	Paulo A. Nunes-Ueno	4,856	1.65
Write-in		2	0.00
Total votes		294,431	100.00
Democratic hold			

== Manhattan ==
2001 Manhattan presidential election

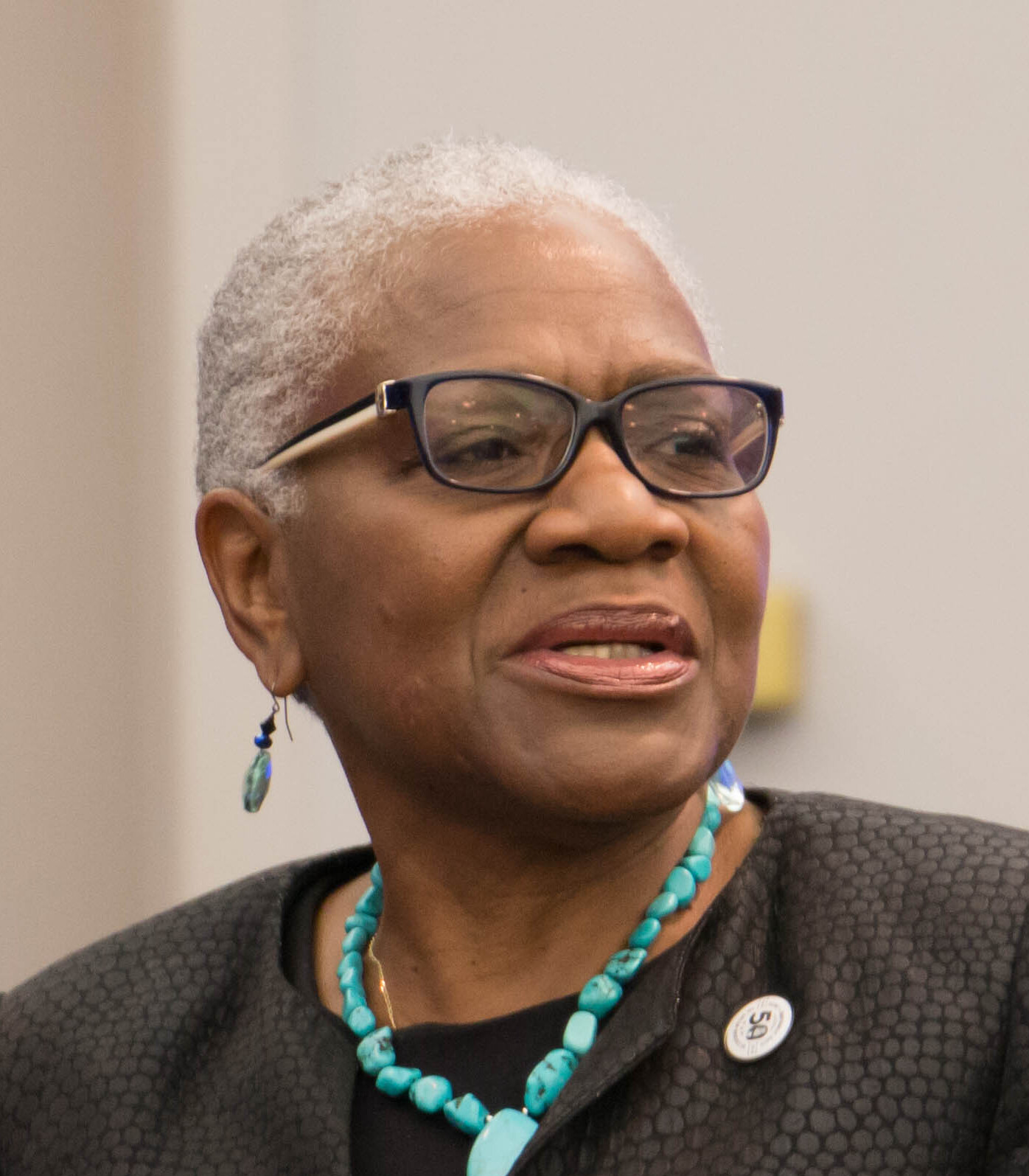

Nominee	C. Virginia Fields	Danniel Maio
Party	Democratic	Republican
Alliance	Liberal
Popular vote	227,929	64,156
Percentage	72.85%	20.50%
- State Assembly results Fields: 50–60% 60–70% 70–80% 80–90% >90%
President before election
C. Virginia Fields
Democratic
Elected President
C. Virginia Fields
Democratic

Incumbent Manhattan Borough President C. Virginia Fields ran for a second term.

=== Democratic ===
==== Candidate ====
- C. Virginia Fields, incumbent borough president

=== Republican ===
==== Candidate ====
- Danniel Maio

=== Minor Third Parties ===
Besides the Democratic and Republican parties, the Conservative, Green, Independence and Working Families parties were qualified New York parties. These parties had automatic ballot access.

=== Green ===
==== Candidate ====
- Michael G. Kasenter

=== Independence ===
==== Candidate ====
- Jesse A. Fields

=== Libertarian ===
==== Candidate ====
- Scott Jeffrey

=== Marijuana Reform ===
==== Candidate ====
- Garry Goodrow

=== General Election ===
Fields won reelection with 72.8% of the vote, with Maio receiving 20.5%.

2001 Manhattan Borough President Election
Party	Candidate	Votes	%
Democratic	C. Virginia Fields	221,956	70.94
Liberal	C. Virginia Fields	5,973	1.91
Total	C. Virginia Fields (incumbent)	227,929	72.85
Republican	Danniel Maio	64,156	20.50
Marijuana Reform	Garry Goodrow	7,322	2.34
Independence	Jesse A. Fields	6,654	2.13
Green	Michael G. Kasenter	3,767	1.20
Libertarian	Scott Jeffrey	3,052	0.98
Write-in		5	0.00
Total votes		312,885	100.00
Democratic hold			

== Queens ==
2001 Queens presidential election

Nominee	Helen Marshall	Alfonso C. Stabile
Party	Democratic	Republican
Alliance	Liberal; Working Families	Conservative
Popular vote	193,970	88,012
Percentage	67.99%	30.85%
- State Assembly results Marshall: 50–60% 60–70% 70–80% 80–90% >90% Stabile: 50–60%
President before election
Claire Shulman
Democratic
Elected President
Helen Marshall
Democratic

Incumbent Queens Borough President Claire Shulman was ineligible to run for another term.

=== Democratic primary ===
==== Candidates ====
- Carol A. Gresser
- Sheldon S. Leffler, New York City Council member
- Helen Marshall, New York City Council member

==== Results ====
2001 Queens Borough President Democratic Primary Results
Party	Candidate	Votes	%
Democratic	Helen M. Marshall	78,653	52.69
Democratic	Carol A. Gresser	46,155	30.92
Democratic	Sheldon S. Leffler	24,416	16.36
Write-in		51	0.03
Total votes		149,275	100.00

=== Republican ===
==== Candidate ====
- Alfonso C. Stabile, New York City Council member

=== Minor Third Parties ===
Besides the Democratic and Republican parties, the Conservative, Green, Independence and Working Families parties were qualified New York parties. These parties had automatic ballot access.

=== Green ===
==== Candidate ====
- Dorothy Williams-Pereira

=== General Election ===
Marshall won the election with 68.% of the vote, with Stabile receiving 30.8%.

2001 Queens Borough President Election
Party	Candidate	Votes	%
Democratic	Helen M. Marshall	185,558	65.04
Working Families	Helen M. Marshall	4,800	1.68
Liberal	Helen M. Marshall	3,612	1.27
Total	Helen M. Marshall	193,970	67.99
Republican	Alfonso C. Stabile	80,797	28.32
Conservative	Alfonso C. Stabile	7,215	2.53
Total	Alfonso C. Stabile	88,012	30.85
Green	Dorothy Williams-Pereira	3,317	1.16
Write-in		9	0.00
Total votes		285,308	100.00
Democratic hold			

== Staten Island ==
2001 Staten Island presidential election
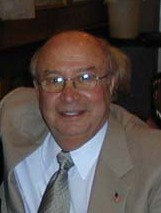

Nominee	James Molinaro	Jerome X. O'Donovan	Robert A. Straniere
Party	Conservative	Democratic	Independence
Alliance	Republican; Right to Life	Working Families
Popular vote	51,517	45,763	5,571
Percentage	49.51%	43.98%	5.35%
- State Assembly results Molinaro: 50–60% O'Donovan: 50–60%
President before election
Guy Molinari
Republican
Elected President
James Molinaro
Conservative

Incumbent Staten Island Borough President Guy Molinari was ineligible to run for another term.

=== Democratic ===
==== Candidate ====
- Jerome X. O'Donovan, New York City Council member

==== Candidates ====
- James Molinaro, deputy borough president
- Robert A. Straniere, New York State Assembly member

==== Results ====
2001 Staten Island Borough President Republican Primary Results
Party	Candidate	Votes	%
Republican	James Molinaro (Note: Member of the Conservative Party.)	8,512	65.84
Republican	Robert A. Straniere	4,414	34.14
Write-in		2	0.02
Total votes		12,928	100.00

=== Minor Third Parties ===
Besides the Democratic and Republican parties, the Conservative, Green, Independence and Working Families parties were qualified New York parties. These parties had automatic ballot access.

=== Independence primary ===
2001 Staten Island Borough President Independence Primary Results
Party	Candidate	Votes	%
Independence	Robert A. Straniere (Note: Running in the Republican Party primary.)	209	71.58
Write-in		83	28.42
Total votes		292	100.00

=== Liberal ===
==== Candidate ====
- John Walker

=== General Election ===
2001 Staten Island Borough President Election
Party	Candidate	Votes	%
Republican	James Molinaro	46,832	45.01
Conservative	James Molinaro	3,020	2.90
Right to Life	James Molinaro	1,665	1.60
Total	James Molinaro (incumbent)	51,517	49.51
Democratic	Jerome X. O'Donovan	43,081	41.41
Working Families	Jerome X. O'Donovan	2,682	2.58
Total	Jerome X. O'Donovan	45,763	43.98
Independence	Robert A. Straniere	5,571	5.35
Liberal	John Walker	1,188	1.14
Write-in		5	0.00
Total votes		104,044	100.00
Conservative gain from Republican			
