= Walter Hart (disambiguation) =

Walter Hart (died 1472) was a medieval Bishop of Norwich. Other people named Walter Hart or Harte include:

- Walter Hart (rugby union) (born 1935), Scottish rugby union player
- Walter R. Hart (1894–1969), American judge
- Walter Harte (1709–1774), English poet and historian
- Walter Harte (clergyman) (1650–1735), English clergyman

== See also ==
- Charles Walter Hart (1872–1937), American mechanical engineer, inventor, and businessman
