= New York's 55th State Assembly district =

American legislative district

Assemblymember
Latrice Walker; D–Brownsville

New York's 55th State Assembly district is one of the 150 districts in the New York State Assembly. It has been represented by Latrice Walker since 2015.

== Geography ==
=== 2020s ===
District 55 is in Brooklyn, encompassing most of Brownsville and Ocean Hill, and portions of Bed-Stuy, Crown Heights and East New York.

The district overlaps (partially) with New York's 7th, 8th and 9th congressional districts, the 19th, 20th and 25th districts of the New York State Senate, and the 36th, 37th, 41st and 42nd districts of the New York City Council.

=== 2010s ===
District 55 is in Brooklyn, encompassing portions of Brownsville and Ocean Hill.

== Recent election results ==
=== 2026 ===
2026 New York State Assembly election, District 55
Party	Candidate	Votes	%
Democratic	Latrice Walker		
Working Families	Latrice Walker		
Total	Latrice Walker (incumbent)		
Write-in			
Total votes			100.0

=== 2024 ===
2024 New York State Assembly election, District 55
Party	Candidate	Votes	%
Democratic	Latrice Walker (incumbent)	28,825	91.5
Republican	Berneda Jackson	2,068	
Conservative	Berneda Jackson	544	
Total	Berneda Jackson	2,612	8.3
Write-in		51	0.2
Total votes			100.0
Democratic hold			

=== 2022 ===
2022 New York State Assembly election, District 55
Primary election
Party	Candidate	Votes	%
Democratic	Latrice Walker (incumbent)	5,008	90.4
Democratic	Tracey Cashaw	507	9.2
Write-in		23	0.4
Total votes		5,538	100.0
General election
Democratic	Latrice Walker	15,687	
Working Families	Latrice Walker	1,079	
Total	Latrice Walker (incumbent)	16,766	92.9
Republican	Berneda Jackson	830	4.6
Rent Is Too Damn High	Anthony Jones	430	2.4
Write-in		12	0.1
Total votes		18,038	100.0
Democratic hold			

=== 2020 ===
2020 New York State Assembly election, District 55
Party	Candidate	Votes	%
Democratic	Latrice Walker (incumbent)	37,501	95.3
Republican	Berneda Jackson	1,826	4.6
Write-in		34	0.1
Total votes		39,361	100.0
Democratic hold			

=== 2018 ===
2018 New York State Assembly election, District 55
Party	Candidate	Votes	%
Democratic	Latrice Walker	27,045	
Working Families	Latrice Walker	865	
Total	Latrice Walker (incumbent)	27,910	98.1
Republican	Berneda Jackson	513	1.8
Write-in		14	0.1
Total votes		28,437	100.0
Democratic hold			

=== 2016 ===
2016 New York State Assembly election, District 55
Primary election
Party	Candidate	Votes	%
Democratic	Latrice Walker (incumbent)	4,276	74.2
Democratic	Darlene Mealy	1,475	25.6
Write-in		9	0.2
Total votes		5,760	100.0
General election
Democratic	Latrice Walker	34,172	
Working Families	Latrice Walker	1,180	
Total	Latrice Walker (incumbent)	35,352	97.6
Republican	Berneda Jackson	869	2.4
Write-in		17	0.0
Total votes		36,238	100.0
Democratic hold			

=== 2014 ===
2014 New York State Assembly election, District 55
Primary election
Party	Candidate	Votes	%
Democratic	Latrice Walker	1,930	39.9
Democratic	Lori Boozer	1,078	22.2
Democratic	Anthony Jones	532	11.0
Democratic	Ineisha Williford	520	10.7
Democratic	Anthony Herbert	397	8.2
Democratic	David Miller	278	5.7
Democratic	Bilal Malik	102	2.1
Write-in		8	0.2
Total votes		4,845	100.0
General election
Democratic	Latrice Walker	10,640	92.4
Working Families	Lori Boozer	597	5.2
Republican	Berneda Jackson	272	2.4
Write-in		10	0.0
Total votes		11,519	100.0
Democratic hold			

=== 2012 ===
2012 New York State Assembly election, District 55
Primary election
Party	Candidate	Votes	%
Democratic	William Boyland Jr. (incumbent)	1,595	36.9
Democratic	Anthony Jones	638	14.8
Democratic	Royston Antoine	564	13.0
Democratic	Anthony Herbert	510	11.8
Democratic	Nathan Bradley	509	11.8
Democratic	David Miller	289	6.7
Democratic	Christopher Durosinmi	207	4.8
Write-in		12	0.2
Total votes		4,324	100.0
General election
Democratic	William Boyland Jr. (incumbent)	30,847	94.5
Independence	Bilal Malik	979	3.0
Republican	Jonathan Anderson	656	2.0
Write-in		171	0.5
Total votes		32,653	100.0
Democratic hold			

=== 2010 ===
2010 New York State Assembly election, District 55
Party	Candidate	Votes	%
Democratic	William Boyland Jr.	14,685	
Working Families	William Boyland Jr.	647	
Total	William Boyland Jr. (incumbent)	15,332	96.6
Republican	Robert Marshall	418	
Conservative	Robert Marshall	125	
Total	Robert Marshall	543	3.4
Write-in		3	0.0
Total votes		15,878	100.0
Democratic hold			

=== 2008 ===
2008 New York State Assembly election, District 55
Primary election
Party	Candidate	Votes	%
Democratic	William Boyland Jr. (incumbent)	2,838	63.8
Democratic	Royston Antoine	883	19.8
Democratic	Leonard Hatter Jr.	728	16.4
Write-in		2	0.0
Total votes		4,451	100.0
General election
Democratic	William Boyland Jr.	26,774	
Working Families	William Boyland Jr.	552	
Total	William Boyland Jr. (incumbent)	27,326	98.1
Republican	Jonathan Anderson	516	1.9
Write-in		0	0.0
Total votes		27,842	100.0
Democratic hold			

=== 2006 ===
2006 New York State Assembly election, District 55
Party	Candidate	Votes	%
Democratic	William Boyland Jr.	9,880	
Working Families	William Boyland Jr.	625	
Total	William Boyland Jr. (incumbent)	10,505	96.0
Republican	Rose Laney	440	4.0
Write-in		1	0.0
Total votes		10,946	100.0
Democratic hold			

=== 2004 ===
2004 New York State Assembly election, District 55
Primary election
Party	Candidate	Votes	%
Democratic	William Boyland Jr. (incumbent)	3,410	71.4
Democratic	Reginald Bowman	1,363	28.6
Write-in		0	0.0
Total votes		4,773	100.0
General election
Democratic	William Boyland Jr.	23,403	
Independence	William Boyland Jr.	365	
Total	William Boyland Jr. (incumbent)	23,768	96.5
Republican	Rose Laney	867	3.5
Write-in		0	0.0
Total votes		24,635	100.0
Democratic hold			

=== 2003 special ===
Incumbent William F. Boyland resigned his seat in January 2003, triggering a special election. In special elections for state legislative offices, primaries are usually not held – county committee members and district leaders for each party select nominees. Election was held on February 25th, 2003.

2003 New York State Assembly special election, District 55
Party	Candidate	Votes	%
Democratic	William Boyland Jr.	1,087	
Independence	William Boyland Jr.	92	
Total	William Boyland Jr.	1,179	68.8
Justice 4 All People	Reginald Bowman	327	19.1
Republican	Abdur Rahman Farrakhan	154	
Conservative	Abdur Rahman Farrakhan	54	
Total	Abdur Rahman Farrakhan	208	12.1
Write-in		0	0.0
Total votes		1,714	100.0
Democratic hold			

=== 2002 ===
2002 New York State Assembly election, District 55
Primary election
Party	Candidate	Votes	%
Democratic	William F. Boyland (incumbent)	3,788	73.5
Democratic	Abdur Rahman Farrakhan	1,368	26.5
Write-in		0	0.0
Total votes		5,156	100.0
General election
Democratic	William F. Boyland	12,025	
Liberal	William F. Boyland	114	
Total	William F. Boyland (incumbent)	12,139	93.4
Republican	Abdur Rahman Farrakhan	856	6.6
Write-in		1	0.0
Total votes		12,996	100.0
Democratic hold			

=== 2000 ===
2000 New York State Assembly election, District 55
Party	Candidate	Votes	%
Democratic	William F. Boyland	21,844	
Liberal	William F. Boyland	230	
Total	William F. Boyland	22,074	97.7
Republican	Edwin Anderson	335	1.5
Independence	Lorraine Stevens	188	0.8
Write-in		0	0.0
Total votes		22,597	100.0
Democratic hold			

=== Federal results in Assembly District 55 ===
Year	Office	Results
2024	President	Harris 89.6 - 9.1%
2024	Senate	Gillibrand 91.5 - 7.7%
2022	Senate	Schumer 94.6 - 4.8%
2020	President	Biden 94.1 - 5.0%
2018	Senate	Gillibrand 98.0 - 1.9%
2016	President	Clinton 95.8 - 2.4%
2016	Senate	Schumer 95.7 - 2.3%
2012	President	Obama 98.8 - 1.0%
2012	Senate	Gillibrand 98.4 - 1.2%
