= Alicka Ampry-Samuel =

American lawyer and politician (born 1976)

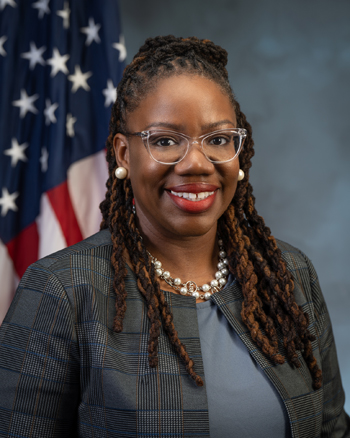
- Official portrait, 2022

Regional Administrator for the U.S. Department of Housing and Urban Development
- Incumbent
- Assumed office January 1, 2022
- Preceded by: Lynne Patton

Member of the New York City Council from the 41st district
- In office January 1, 2018 – December 31, 2021
- Preceded by: Darlene Mealy
- Succeeded by: Darlene Mealy

Personal details
- Born: May 6, 1976 (age 50) Brooklyn, New York, U.S.
- Party: Democratic
- Children: 1

Alicka Ampry-Samuel (born May 6, 1976) is an American lawyer and politician. A Democrat, she served as a New York City Council member for the 41st district. The district included portions of Bedford-Stuyvesant, Ocean Hill-Brownsville, East Flatbush, Crown Heights in Brooklyn.

In an upset, Ampry-Samuel was defeated for re-election in 2021 by Darlene Mealy, the former Council member whom Ampry-Samuel had succeeded four years earlier.

== Early life and education ==
Ampry-Samuel was born on May 6, 1976, in Brownsville, one of the most impoverished neighborhoods of Brooklyn. She graduated from North Carolina A&T State University and the CUNY School of Law.

== Career ==
Ampry-Samuel first ran for the City Council in 2005, but lost to Darlene Mealy in the Democratic primary.

Prior to public office, Ampry-Samuel worked as a Child Protective Specialist with the NYC Administration for Children Services.

From 2012 to 2014, during a stint at the US Embassy in Ghana, she worked as a communication and outreach specialist for the United States Agency for International Development and subsequently on a human rights portfolio in the Embassy's Political Office. She also served as Chief of Staff for State Assemblywoman Latrice Walker.

=== New York City Council ===
Three-term Councilwoman Darlene Mealy was term-limited in 2017 and unable to seek another term. Ampry-Samuel was one of nine Democrats who vied to replace her, and she won the Democratic primary with just over 31% of the vote. She would go on to win the general election in the overwhelmingly Democratic district with over 95% of the vote.

Ampry-Samuel was sworn into office on January 1, 2018.

Election history
| Location | Year | Election | Results |
|---|---|---|---|
| NYC Council District 41 | 2005 | Democratic Primary | √ Darlene Mealy 46.77% William Boyland, Jr. 18.85% Danny King 9.06% Royston Antoine 5.98% Stanley Kinard 5.11% David R. Miller 3.50% Alicka Ampry-Samuel 3.23% |
| NYC Council District 41 | 2017 | Democratic Primary | √ Alicka Ampry-Samuel 31.23% Henry L. Butler 22.04% Cory Provost 11.20% Moreen A. King 8.51% Deidre Olivera 8.11% Royston Antoine 5.72% Victor A. Jordan 5.28% David R. Miller 4.86% Leopold Cox 2.89% |
| NYC Council District 41 | 2017 | General | √ Alicka Ampry-Samuel (D) 95.49% Berneda Jackson (R) 3.18% Christopher Carew (I) 1.19% |

=== Housing and Urban Development ===
Ampry-Samuel was sworn into office as the Regional Administrator for New York and New Jersey of the U.S. Department of Housing and Urban Development on January 18, 2022.

Political offices
| Preceded by Darlene Mealy | New York City Council, 41st district 2018–present | Incumbent |
