= New York City's 41st City Council district =

- Boundaries following the 2020 census

Government
  - Councilmember: . Darlene Mealy. D–Bedford-Stuyvesant

Population (2010)
  - Total: 153,328

Demographics
  - Black: 81%
  - Hispanic: 14%
  - White: 2%
  - Asian: 1%
  - Other: 2%

Registration
  - Democratic: 80.7%
  - Republican: 3.1%
  - No party preference: 13.8%
- Registered voters (2021) 107,686

New York City's 41st City Council district is one of 51 districts in the New York City Council. It has been represented by Democrat Darlene Mealy since 2022, succeeding fellow Democrat Alicka Ampry-Samuel; Mealy defeated Ampry-Samuel in the 2021 Democratic primary.

== Geography ==
District 41 covers a series of predominantly Black neighborhoods in central and eastern Brooklyn, including parts of Bedford–Stuyvesant, Brownsville, East Flatbush, Crown Heights, and Ocean Hill.

The district overlaps with Brooklyn Community Boards 3, 8, 9, 16, and 17, and with New York's 8th and 9th congressional districts. It also overlaps with the 18th, 19th, 20th, 21st, and 25th districts of the New York State Senate, and with the 43rd, 54th, 55th, 56th, and 58th districts of the New York State Assembly.

As of the 2010 Census, the district was over 80 percent Black, making it the district with the largest Black population in the city. Correspondingly, every councilmember to represent the district since its creation has been Black.

Members	Party	Years served	Electoral history
District established January 1, 1992
Enoch H. Williams (Brownsville)	Democratic	January 1, 1992 – December 31, 1997	Redistricted from the 26th district and re-elected in 1991. Re-elected in 1993. Retired.
Tracy L. Boyland (Brownsville)	Democratic	January 1, 1998 – December 31, 2005	Elected in 1997. Re-elected in 2001. Retired to run for U.S. House of Representatives.
Darlene Mealy (Bedford-Stuyvesant)	Democratic	January 1, 2006 – December 31, 2017	Elected in 2005. Re-elected in 2009. Re-elected in 2013. Termed out.
Alicka Ampry-Samuel (Brownsville)	Democratic	January 1, 2018 – December 31, 2021	Elected in 2017. Lost renomination.
Darlene Mealy (Bedford-Stuyvesant)	Democratic	January 1, 2022 –	Elected in 2021. Re-elected in 2023. Re-elected in 2025.

== Recent election results ==
=== 2025 ===
2025 New York City Council election, District 41 Democratic primary
Party	Candidate	Maximum round	Maximum votes	Share in maximum round	Maximum votes First round votes Transfer votes
Democratic	Darlene Mealy (incumbent)	8	8,251	65.1%	
Democratic	Lawman Lynch	8	4,425	34.9%	
Democratic	Jammel Thompson	7	2,926	20.6%	
Democratic	Bianca Cunningham	5	2,537	16.6%	
Democratic	Jamell Henderson	4	1,095	6.9%	
Democratic	Dante Arnwine	4	706	4.4%	
Democratic	Eli Brown	3	641	4.0%	
Democratic	Clifton Hinton	2	182	1.1%	
Write-in		1	67	0.4%	

2025 New York City Council election, District 41 general election
Party	Candidate	Votes	%
Democratic	Darlene Mealy (incumbent)	25,898	93.0
United Alliance	Yehuda Shaffer	1,741	6.3
Write-in		199	0.7
Total votes		27,838	100.0
Democratic hold			

=== 2023 (redistricting) ===
Due to redistricting and the 2020 changes to the New York City Charter, councilmembers elected during the 2021 and 2023 City Council elections will serve two-year terms, with full four-year terms resuming after the 2025 New York City Council elections.

2023 New York City Council election, District 41
Primary election
Party	Candidate	Votes	%
Democratic	Darlene Mealy (incumbent)	2,806	61.4
Democratic	Iris McIntosh Green	1,346	29.5
Democratic	Reginald Bowman	234	5.1
Democratic	Joyce Shearin	162	3.5
Write-in		22	0.5
Total votes		4,570	100.0
General election
Democratic	Darlene Mealy (incumbent)	6,134	97.5
Write-in		155	2.5
Total votes		6,289	100.0
Democratic hold			

=== 2021 ===
In 2019, voters in New York City approved Ballot Question 1, which implemented ranked-choice voting in all local elections. Under the new system, voters have the option to rank up to five candidates for every local office. Voters whose first-choice candidates fare poorly will have their votes redistributed to other candidates in their ranking until one candidate surpasses the 50 percent threshold. If one candidate surpasses 50 percent in first-choice votes, then ranked-choice tabulations will not occur.

An interactive map of District 41

2021 New York City Council election, District 41
Primary election
Party	Candidate	Votes	%
Democratic	Darlene Mealy	8,849	57.3
Democratic	Alicka Ampry-Samuel (incumbent)	6,507	42.1
Write-in		91	0.6
Total votes		15,447	100
General election
Democratic	Darlene Mealy	15,911	95.5
Green	Scott Hutchins	694	4.2
Write-in		51	0.3
Total votes		16,656	100
Democratic hold			

=== 2017 ===
2017 New York City Council election, District 41
Primary election
Party	Candidate	Votes	%
Democratic	Alicka Ampry-Samuel	3,385	31.2
Democratic	Henry Butler	2,389	22.0
Democratic	Cory Provost	1,214	11.2
Democratic	Moreen King	922	8.5
Democratic	Deidre Olivera	879	8.1
Democratic	Royston Antoine	620	5.7
Democratic	Victor Jordan	572	5.3
Democratic	David Miller	527	4.9
Democratic	Leopold Cox	313	2.9
Write-in		17	0.2
Total votes		10,838	100
General election
Democratic	Alicka Ampry-Samuel	17,520	
Working Families	Alicka Ampry-Samuel	683	
Total	Alicka Ampry-Samuel	18,203	95.5
Republican	Berneda Jackson	469	
Conservative	Berneda Jackson	138	
Total	Berneda Jackson	607	3.2
Solutions	Christopher Carew	227	1.2
Write-in		24	0.1
Total votes		19,061	100
Democratic hold			

=== 2013 ===
2013 New York City Council election, District 41
Primary election
Party	Candidate	Votes	%
Democratic	Darlene Mealy (incumbent)	7,607	66.3
Democratic	Kathleen Daniel	2,284	19.9
Democratic	Stanley Kinard	1,575	13.7
Write-in		3	0.0
Total votes		11,469	100
General election
Democratic	Darlene Mealy	17,165	
Working Families	Darlene Mealy	413	
Total	Darlene Mealy (incumbent)	17,578	97.3
Independence	Bilal Malik	474	2.6
Write-in		12	0.1
Total votes		18,064	100
Democratic hold			
