= Darlene Mealy =

American politician (born 1964)

Member of the New York City Council from the 41st district
- Incumbent
- Assumed office January 1, 2022
- Preceded by: Alicka Ampry-Samuel
- In office January 1, 2006 – December 31, 2017
- Preceded by: Tracy L. Boyland
- Succeeded by: Alicka Ampry-Samuel

Personal details
- Born: August 31, 1964 (age 62)
- Party: Democratic
- Education: Manhattan Community College
- Website: Official website

Darlene Mealy (born August 31, 1964) is an American politician who is a member of the New York City Council from the 41st district, which includes Brownsville, Crown Heights, East Flatbush and Prospect Lefferts Gardens in Brooklyn.

A Democrat, Mealy previously held the same seat from 2006 to 2017. In 2021, she defeated incumbent Alicka Ampry-Samuel in the Democratic primary in a major upset.

== Life and career ==
Mealy was born in Detroit, Michigan, and attended public schools, graduating from George Wingate High School. Following high school, she attended the Borough of Manhattan Community College (BMCC) and later pursued coursework in Labor & Women’s Studies offered by Cornell University.

Prior to her election to the New York City Council, Mealy was employed at the New York City Transit Authority for 17 years, in the Department of Buses Technical Services Division.

=== Controversies ===
She brought controversial attention to herself in 2009 when she voted to give $5,000 of public money to Lynval Samuels (also known as Dr. Bidi XiLi Bey), for teaching "etymology". Referred to by some as a lunatic, Samuels "has been a fixture at Union St. and Utica Ave. for years, neighbors said - stopping traffic, splattering paint on parking meters and fire hydrants, and handing out flyers for his self-styled etymology classes."

Mealy was also highlighted by the press for a history of questionable housing deals she was involved in before becoming a councilwoman. In 1993, when Mealy was still with the MTA, she and her sister moved into a 3-bedroom, low-income apartment in Bushwick. These apartments were only available to families on limited incomes, specifically, those making less than $15,200 a year. Within two years, however, Mealy and her sister had purchased a $90,000 brownstone.

In 2014, Mealy "failed to pay the landlord who owned the space she leased for her district office for five months and then had him arrested when he changed the locks."

In 2026, the Manhattan District Attorney announced charges against four members of Mealy's family, alleging they were part of a deed theft ring that tried to steal a family's home in Harlem.

== New York City Council ==
Mealy was first elected to the 41st district of the New York City Council in 2005 after defeating William Boyland, Jr., a member of the famed Boyland political family. She was re-elected in 2009 after narrowly besting Tracy E. Boyland.

In 2010, Mealy was also elected as the Democratic District Leader for the 55th Assembly District in Brooklyn after defeating Latrice Walker, the legal counsel to Congresswoman Yvette Clarke and future assemblymember. Mealy was re-elected to her third term on the City Council in 2013, beating her Democratic rival Kathleen Daniel 66% to 20%.

Mealy chaired the Contracts Committee and was the co-chair of the Council’s Brooklyn delegation, and a member of the Black, Latino and Asian Caucus and the Women’s Caucus.

She courted attention when she was televised tearfully casting her "yes" vote regarding Mayor Michael Bloomberg's efforts to overturn a referendum limiting him to two terms as New York City's Mayor. She had previously stated that she opposed the measure. In 2011, Mealy earned the distinction of missing the highest percentage of meetings and hearings she was supposed to have attended - 24%. In 2023, Mealy attracted notice for her poor attendance record at City Council meetings, as she had been absent for 32% of meetings that term so far, and for how difficult it was for district residents to speak to her or her office, as the district office was rarely open.

== Electoral history ==
=== 2025 ===
2025 New York City Council Democratic primary, District 41
| Party | Candidate | Maximum round | Maximum votes | Share in maximum round | Maximum votes First round votes Transfer votes |
|---|---|---|---|---|---|
| Democratic | Darlene Mealy (incumbent) | 8 | 8,251 | 65.1% | |
| Democratic | Lawman Lynch | 8 | 4,425 | 34.9% | |
| Democratic | Jammel Thompson | 7 | 2,926 | 20.6% | |
| Democratic | Bianca Cunningham | 5 | 2,537 | 16.6% | |
| Democratic | Jamell Henderson | 4 | 1,095 | 6.9% | |
| Democratic | Dante Arnwine | 4 | 706 | 4.4% | |
| Democratic | Eli Brown | 3 | 641 | 4.0% | |
| Democratic | Clifton A. Hinton | 2 | 182 | 1.1% | |
| Write-In | | 1 | 67 | 0.4% | |

2025 New York City Council election, District 41
| Party | Candidate | Votes | % |
|---|---|---|---|
| Democratic | Darlene Mealy (incumbent) | 25,898 | 93.0 |
| United Alliance | Yehuda Shaffer | 1,741 | 6.3 |
| Write-in | | 199 | 0.7 |
| Total votes | | 27,838 | 100.0 |
| Democratic hold | | | |

=== 2023 ===
2023 New York City Council Democratic primary, District 41
| Party | Candidate | Votes | % |
|---|---|---|---|
| Democratic | Darlene Mealy (incumbent) | 2,806 | 61.4 |
| Democratic | Isis McIntosh Green | 1,346 | 29.5 |
| Democratic | Reginald Bowman | 234 | 5.1 |
| Democratic | Joyce D. Shearin | 162 | 3.5 |
| Write-in | | 22 | 0.5 |
| Total votes | | 4,570 | 100.0 |

2023 New York City Council election, District 41
| Party | Candidate | Votes | % |
|---|---|---|---|
| Democratic | Darlene Mealy (incumbent) | 6,134 | 96.2 |
| Write-in | | 155 | 1.0 |
| Total votes | | 6,289 | 100.0 |
| Democratic hold | | | |

=== 2021 ===
2021 New York City Council Democratic primary, District 41
| Party | Candidate | Votes | % |
|---|---|---|---|
| Democratic | Darlene Mealy | 8,849 | 57.3 |
| Democratic | Alicka Ampry-Samuel (incumbent) | 6,507 | 42.1 |
| Write-in | | 91 | 0.6 |
| Total votes | | 15,447 | 100.0 |

2021 New York City Council election, District 41
| Party | Candidate | Votes | % |
|---|---|---|---|
| Democratic | Darlene Mealy | 15,911 | 95.5 |
| Green | Scott Hutchins | 694 | 4.2 |
| Write-in | | 51 | 0.3 |
| Total votes | | 16,656 | 100.0 |
| Democratic hold | | | |

=== 2013 ===
2013 New York City Council Democratic primary, District 41
| Party | Candidate | Votes | % |
|---|---|---|---|
| Democratic | Darlene Mealy (incumbent) | 7,607 | 66.3 |
| Democratic | Kathleen Daniel | 2,284 | 19.9 |
| Democratic | Stanley Kinard | 1,575 | 13.7 |
| Write-in | | 3 | 0.0 |
| Total votes | | 11,469 | 100.0 |

2013 New York City Council election, District 41
| Party | Candidate | Votes | % |
|---|---|---|---|
| Democratic | Darlene Mealy | 17,165 | 95.0 |
| Working Families | Darlene Mealy | 413 | 2.3 |
| Total | Darlene Mealy (incumbent) | 17,578 | 97.3 |
| Independence | Bilal Malik | 474 | 2.6 |
| Write-in | | 12 | 0.1 |
| Total votes | | 18,064 | 100.0 |
| Democratic hold | | | |

=== 2009 ===
2009 New York City Council Democratic primary, District 41
| Party | Candidate | Votes | % |
|---|---|---|---|
| Democratic | Darlene Mealy (incumbent) | 2,802 | 36.8 |
| Democratic | Tracy L. Boyland | 2,724 | 35.8 |
| Democratic | Tulani Kinard | 1,536 | 20.2 |
| Democratic | Anthony L. Herbert | 546 | 7.2 |
| Total votes | | 7,608 | 100.0 |

2009 New York City Council election, District 41
| Party | Candidate | Votes | % |
|---|---|---|---|
| Democratic | Darlene Mealy (incumbent) | 13,454 | 95.1 |
| Republican | Rose Laney | 637 | 4.5 |
| Write-in | | 49 | 0.3 |
| Total votes | | 14,140 | 100.0 |
| Democratic hold | | | |

=== 2005 ===
2005 New York City Council Democratic primary, District 41
| Party | Candidate | Votes | % |
|---|---|---|---|
| Democratic | Darlene Mealy | 4,480 | 46.8 |
| Democratic | William F. Boyland | 1,806 | 18.9 |
| Democratic | Danny King | 868 | 9.1 |
| Democratic | Royston P. Antoine | 573 | 6.0 |
| Democratic | Stanley Kinard | 489 | 5.1 |
| Democratic | David R. Miller | 335 | 3.5 |
| Democratic | Alicka Ampry-Samuel | 309 | 3.2 |
| Democratic | Pamela M. Junior | 294 | 3.1 |
| Democratic | Essie M. Duggan | 276 | 2.9 |
| Democratic | Maryam A. Samad | 149 | 1.6 |
| Total votes | | 9,579 | 100.0 |

2005 New York City Council election, District 41
| Party | Candidate | Votes | % |
|---|---|---|---|
| Democratic | Darlene Mealy | 11,102 | 85.8 |
| Working Families | Darlene Mealy | 562 | 4.3 |
| Total | Darlene Mealy | 11,664 | 90.1 |
| Republican | A. Brinmore C. Britton | 899 | 6.9 |
| Independence | Naquan Abdul Hanif Muhammad | 377 | 2.9 |
| Total votes | | 12,940 | 100.0 |
| Democratic hold | | | |

Political offices
| Preceded by Tracy L. Boyland | Member of the New York City Council from the 41st district 2006–2017 | Succeeded by Alicka Ampry-Samuel |
| Preceded by Alicka Ampry-Samuel | Member of the New York City Council from the 41st district 2022–present | Incumbent |
