= William Boyland =

William Boyland may refer to:

- William Boyland (Australian politician) (1885–1967), member of the Victorian Legislative Assembly
- William F. Boyland, New York assemblyman
- William Boyland Jr. (born 1970), his son, New York assemblyman
