= Tracy L. Boyland =

American politician (born 1968)

Member of the New York City Council from the 41st district
- In office January 1, 1998 – December 31, 2005
- Preceded by: Enoch H. Williams
- Succeeded by: Darlene Mealy

Personal details
- Born: December 18, 1968 (age 57) New York City, U.S.
- Party: Democratic

Tracy L. Boyland (born December 18, 1968) is an American politician who served in the New York City Council from the 41st district from 1998 to 2005. A Democrat, she represented a Brooklyn district covering parts of Bedford–Stuyvesant, Brownsville, Crown Heights, East Flatbush and Ocean Hill, and chaired the council's Committee on Women's Issues.

Boyland is a member of a family that has held elected office in Brownsville since the 1970s and that The New York Times has called "the Kennedys of Brownsville". After leaving the council she ran unsuccessfully for the New York State Senate in 2006 and for her former council seat in 2009.

== Family ==
Boyland's uncle, Thomas S. Boyland, represented the 55th district in the New York State Assembly from 1977 until his death in 1982. Her father, William F. Boyland, won the same seat and held it for more than twenty years, and her brother, William Boyland Jr., succeeded their father in the Assembly.

== New York City Council ==
Boyland was elected to the New York City Council in 1997, succeeding Enoch H. Williams, and took office on January 1, 1998. She was re-elected in 2001 and served until the end of 2005. During her tenure she chaired the council's Committee on Women's Issues.

Her seat was won in 2005 by Darlene Mealy, who defeated Boyland's father in the Democratic primary.

== Later campaigns ==
In 2006, Boyland challenged Velmanette Montgomery, who had represented the 18th State Senate district since 1985, in the Democratic primary. The contest was one of the few primary challenges to a sitting Brooklyn state senator that year. Montgomery won the September primary.

In 2009, Boyland entered the Democratic primary for her former council seat, then held by Mealy. Mealy was re-elected.
