= Daphne Sheppard =

American journalist

Daphne Sheppard was an American journalist. She was a Brooklyn-based columnist, journalist manager and editor for the New York Amsterdam News from 1955 until 1970. The New York Amsterdam News is one of the oldest and largest newspapers established by, for and about the African American community in the United States. The weekly publication was established in Harlem in 1910, and remains in circulation today.

== Career ==
Sheppard was listed as Brooklyn Manager on the newspaper's mastheads from 1955 to 1965, and a New York Times article in 1970 refers to her as the Brooklyn Editor of the paper. From 1955 to 1970, Sheppard was also major contributor to the weekly publication. In her regular column “Kings Diary,” of which she authored more than 180 entries, Sheppard reported and commented on social and political happenings in Brooklyn's predominantly African American communities of Bedford Stuyvesant, Ocean Hill and Brownsville in Central Brooklyn. Subjects of her column included local politics, and the activities of local civic, business, educational and social associations, as well as updates and commentaries on prominent community members. As a reporter, Sheppard also covered developments and controversies related to desegregation, equity and leadership of Central Brooklyn's public schools, including the short-lived Community Control Experiment in which a board of community leaders assumed administrative responsibilities for two public schools in Ocean Hill and Brownsville, and the establishment of Medgar Evers College, a college of the City University of New York, in 1970. Sheppard also reported on Shirley Chisholm’s historic election as the first African American woman to serve in the United States Congress in 1968, when she defeated rival James Farmer, a prominent leader of the civil rights movement to become the Representative for New York’s 12th congressional district (which included Bedford-Stuyvesant and other neighborhoods of Brooklyn and Queens).

== Honors ==
In 1964, Sheppard received an award for “accomplishment in the field of journalism” from the Brooklyn Club of Professional Women. In 1970, the New York Urban League granted Sheppard and seven other journalists the John B. Russwurm Award for “’sustained excellence in interpreting, analyzing and reporting.’”
