= 2005 New York City Comptroller election =

- November 8, 2005
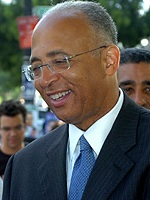

Candidate	Bill Thompson	Herbert F. Ryan
Party	Democratic	Conservative
Alliance	Working Families
Popular vote	751,033	41,603
Percentage	92.55%	5.13%
- Results by State Assembly district Thompson: 50–60% 60–70% 70–80% 80–90% >90%
Comptroller before election
Bill Thompson
Democratic
Elected Comptroller
Bill Thompson
Democratic

The 2005 New York City Comptroller election took place on November 8, 2005, to elect the comptroller of New York City. The election was held concurrently with the races for mayor and public advocate.

The incumbent comptroller, Bill Thompson, a Democrat first elected in 2001, won re-election with 92.55% of the vote.

== Background ==
Thompson, the former president of the New York City Board of Education, was elected comptroller in 2001, when he became the first African American to hold the office. He sought a second term in 2005.

== Democratic primary ==
Thompson was the only Democratic candidate for comptroller, and no Democratic primary for the office was held; the Board of Elections' Democratic primary returns for September 13, 2005, cover only mayor and public advocate.

== Working Families primary ==
Thompson also secured the Working Families Party line through a write-in primary on September 13, 2005, in which 72 write-in votes were cast citywide, 63 of them for "William C. Thompson Jr." as spelled on the ballot and the rest for misspelled variants of his name or other write-in names.

== General election ==
With no Republican running, the election was considered uncompetitive and potentially a lead-up for Thompson to run for mayor in 2009. Thompson had raised $3.5 million by July 5th.

In the general election, Thompson faced Conservative nominee Herbert F. Ryan, Libertarian nominee Ron Moore and Socialist Workers nominee Daniel B. Fein. Thompson won with 92.55% of the vote, carrying every borough.

Candidate	Party/Line	Votes	% of candidate votes
William C. Thompson Jr.	Democratic + Working Families	751,033	92.55%
Herbert F. Ryan	Conservative	41,603	5.13%
Ron Moore	Libertarian	11,289	1.39%
Daniel B. Fein	Socialist Workers	7,527	0.93%
Write-ins		26	<0.01%
Total		811,478	100.00%

Thompson received 710,196 votes on the Democratic line and 40,837 on the Working Families line.

=== Results by borough ===
Candidate	Manhattan	The Bronx	Brooklyn	Queens	Staten Island	Total
William C. Thompson Jr. (Democratic)	200,260	117,767	188,492	170,550	33,127	710,196
William C. Thompson Jr. (Working Families)	11,533	4,909	14,035	7,895	2,465	40,837
Thompson total	211,793	122,676	202,527	178,445	35,592	751,033
Herbert F. Ryan (Conservative)	7,888	3,809	9,476	13,379	7,051	41,603
Ron Moore (Libertarian)	4,186	986	2,863	2,503	751	11,289
Daniel B. Fein (Socialist Workers)	2,009	1,048	2,486	1,557	427	7,527
Write-ins	5	4	8	8	1	26
Total votes	225,881	128,523	217,360	195,892	43,822	811,478

== Aftermath ==
Thompson was sworn in for a second term on January 1, 2006. He served until the end of 2009, after running for mayor in 2009, where he narrowly lost to Michael Bloomberg.
