= Enoch H. Williams =

American politician (1927–2012)

Member of the New York City Council from the 41st district
- In office January 1, 1992 – December 31, 1997
- Preceded by: District created
- Succeeded by: Tracy L. Boyland

Member of the New York City Council from the 26th district
- In office October 28, 1978 – December 31, 1991
- Preceded by: Samuel D. Wright
- Succeeded by: Walter McCaffrey

Personal details
- Born: June 21, 1927 Wilmington, North Carolina
- Died: April 24, 2012 (aged 84) Heathrow, Florida
- Party: Democratic

Enoch H. Williams (June 21, 1927 – April 24, 2012) was an American politician who served in the New York City Council from 1978 to 1997.

Williams was born in Wilmington, North Carolina on June 21, 1927. His father died when he was very young, and his mother relocated to Harlem. He served in the Army during World War II and the Korean War. Williams received a bachelor's degree in business management from Long Island University and studied urban renewal at New York University and the New School. He then ran a coin laundry business and a church housing program.

Williams was the civilian director of the selective service system in New York City for many years; he also continued his military service as a member of the National Guard and retired as a brigadier general. In 1990, he succeeded Vincent W. Lanna as commander of the New York Guard, the volunteer organization that augments the National Guard. He was a delegate to the Democratic National Convention three times. He died on April 24, 2012, in Heathrow, Florida at age 84.
