= Eric Gioia =

American politician

Eric N. Gioia
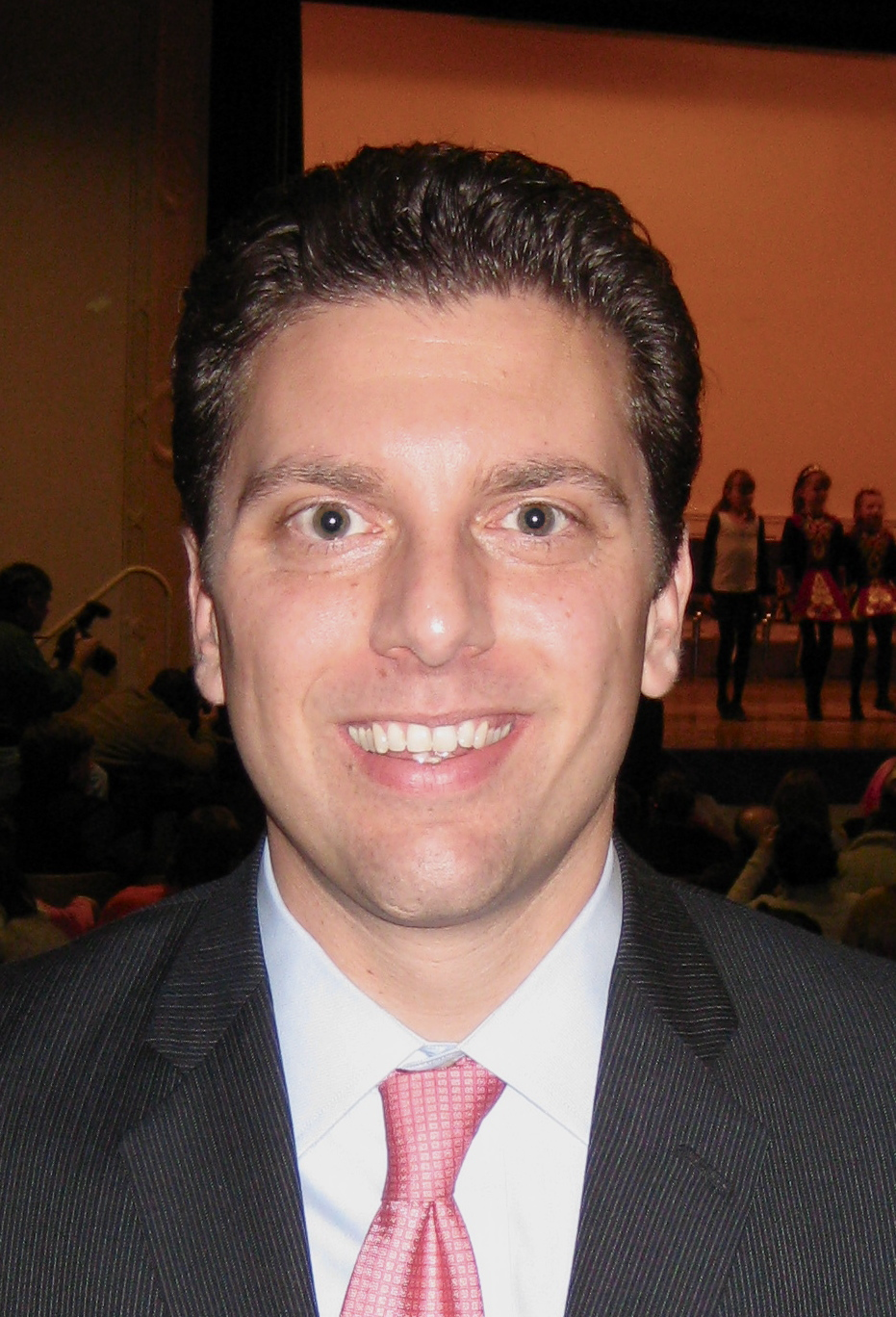

Member of the New York City Council from the 26th district
- In office January 1, 2002 – December 31, 2009
- Preceded by: Walter McCaffrey
- Succeeded by: Jimmy Van Bramer
- Constituency: Queens: Woodside, Sunnyside, Long Island City, Astoria, Maspeth

Personal details
- Born: April 27, 1973 (age 53)
- Party: Democratic
- Education: New York University
- Profession: Lawyer

Eric N. Gioia (born April 27, 1973) is a New York City politician of the Democratic Party. He served for eight years as a member of the New York City Council, representing the 26th district. He was elected to two year terms in 2001 and 2003 and to a four-year term in 2005, representing the Queens neighborhoods of Woodside, Sunnyside, Maspeth, and Long Island City.

== Early life and career ==
Gioia attended PS11 Queens, a public elementary school. He worked in his family's florist shop in Woodside, Queens, which has been in operation for more than a century. He attended St. Francis Preparatory School, New York University and Georgetown University Law Center. He worked his way through NYU as a janitor/elevator operator, and member of Service Employees International Union/SEIU-Local 32BJ. He worked as a law clerk in the White House under President Bill Clinton. He worked in private practice in Manhattan at Milbank, Tweed, Hadley & McCloy, and later on Al Gore's presidential campaign in 2000.

As of 2023, Gioia was an adjunct professor at New York University's College of Arts and Science.

== City Council ==
On the City Council, Gioia advocated for the poor, and wrote laws to help alleviate child hunger and to protect the environment. He served as Chairman of the Oversight and Investigations Committee of the New York City Council, in which capacity he conducted over 50 investigations, leading to the passage of laws which protect homeless people with HIV and AIDS, ensure the availability of emergency contraception, increase government accountability and transparency, and encourage voter registration among young people.

He was particularly active in expanding opportunity for the residents of public housing. He founded a youth baseball and basketball league and brought a bank to Queensbridge Houses in Long Island City where previously the closest bank was over a mile away. He led a campaign to get more New Yorkers to claim the Earned Income Tax Credit (EITC), and passed legislation strengthening the Taxpayer's Bill of Rights.

In September 2007, he was named one of City Hall's "40 under 40" for being a young influential member of New York City politics.

Gioia was mentioned as a possible candidate for New York's 14th congressional district.

=== Food Stamp Challenge ===
In 2007, Gioia voluntarily chose to live on $28 for one week, in order to bring attention to the daily struggle of millions of New Yorkers. He stated, "But as tough as this week has been for me, the sad fact is that it was nothing compared with what over 1.1 million New Yorkers face every day. Far too many New Yorkers make impossible choices among health care for their children, paying their rent or putting food on the table on a daily basis."

Gioia introduced legislation to make access to food stamps easier, including putting applications online, and successfully pushed retailer Costco to accept food stamps at two of its New York locations. His work was popular among his constituents. In a major victory for hunger advocates, in 2009 Costco announced that after successfully accepting food stamps in New York City, it would begin accepting food stamps at all locations nationwide.

=== Con Edison ===
In 2006, an extended blackout affected large portions of Gioia's district. Con Edison's slow response and misleading information about the extent of the blackout led Gioia to criticize the company and its CEO, Kevin Burke. After power was fully restored nine days later, Gioia continued to scrutinize the company's safety record. The 2006 blackout was followed by a steam pipe explosion in 2007 and two fatal gas explosions in Queens in 2007 and 2009.

Gioia also criticized the utility company's rate hikes when it continued to pay high dividends to its investors. To improve efficiency, Gioia lobbied Con Ed to implement a smart grid, commenting that "new digital technology - called Smart Meters - has allowed customers elsewhere to cut their bills by 10%, but here in New York, Con Ed continues to rely on 19th century technology to power a 21st century city." In August 2009, Con Ed launched a pilot smart grid project in Gioia's district in Western Queens.

=== Council investigation into FDNY radio problems ===
Fire Department of New York radios failed in the Twin Towers during the rescue operations immediately following the September 11, 2001 attacks on the World Trade Center. Council member Gioia introduced a measure to have the Council investigate the issue of FDNY radio problems.

"I will do everything in my power to get answers, to get the truth ... [T]hese families deserve answers and really the entire city and our country deserve answers", Gioia stated. He introduced the investigation resolution following a petition drive to have the Council investigate the radios issue. The petitions carried 20,000 signatures. Petition organizers congratulated Gioia on his sponsorship of the investigation proposal.

== Public Advocate campaign ==
Having reaffirmed his opposition to extending term limits, and having publicly ruled out seeking re-election in 2009 Gioia ran to become the next New York City Public Advocate. Gioia was endorsed in the primary by the New York Daily News. Gioia raised more money than any of his opponents but finished third with only 18.40% of the vote, behind Mark Green and Bill de Blasio. He was succeeded in the City Council by Jimmy Van Bramer. After leaving the City Council, Gioia accepted a position as Vice President of J.P Morgan Chase's private bank. He remained active in the community and serves on the board of several New York non-profits.

Political offices
Preceded by Walter McCaffrey	New York City Council, 26th district 2002–2009	Succeeded by Jimmy Van Bramer
