= Walter McCaffrey =

American politician (1949–2013)

Member of the New York City Council from the 26th district
- In office January 1, 1992 – December 31, 2001
- Preceded by: Enoch H. Williams
- Succeeded by: Eric Gioia

Member of the New York City Council from the 21st district
- In office January 1, 1986 – December 31, 1991
- Preceded by: Mary C. Crowley
- Succeeded by: Helen M. Marshall

Personal details
- Born: January 28, 1949 Queens, New York City, New York, U.S.
- Died: July 10, 2013 (aged 64) Manhattan, New York City, New York, U.S.
- Party: Democratic

Walter Lawrence McCaffrey (January 28, 1949 – July 10, 2013) was an American politician from New York City.

Born in Queens, New York to Irish parents, he graduated from the Monsignor McClancy Memorial High School and attended Iona College. He served on the New York City Council as a Democrat from 1986 to 2001. He served as a lobbyist and consultant in his business, The McCaffrey Group.

McCaffrey died at age 64, two months after sustaining injuries in a car crash in Manhattan. On May 8, 2014, the corner of 61st Street and Woodside Avenue in Woodside, Queens, New York, was renamed "Walter McCaffery Place".
