= Jimmy Van Bramer =

American politician

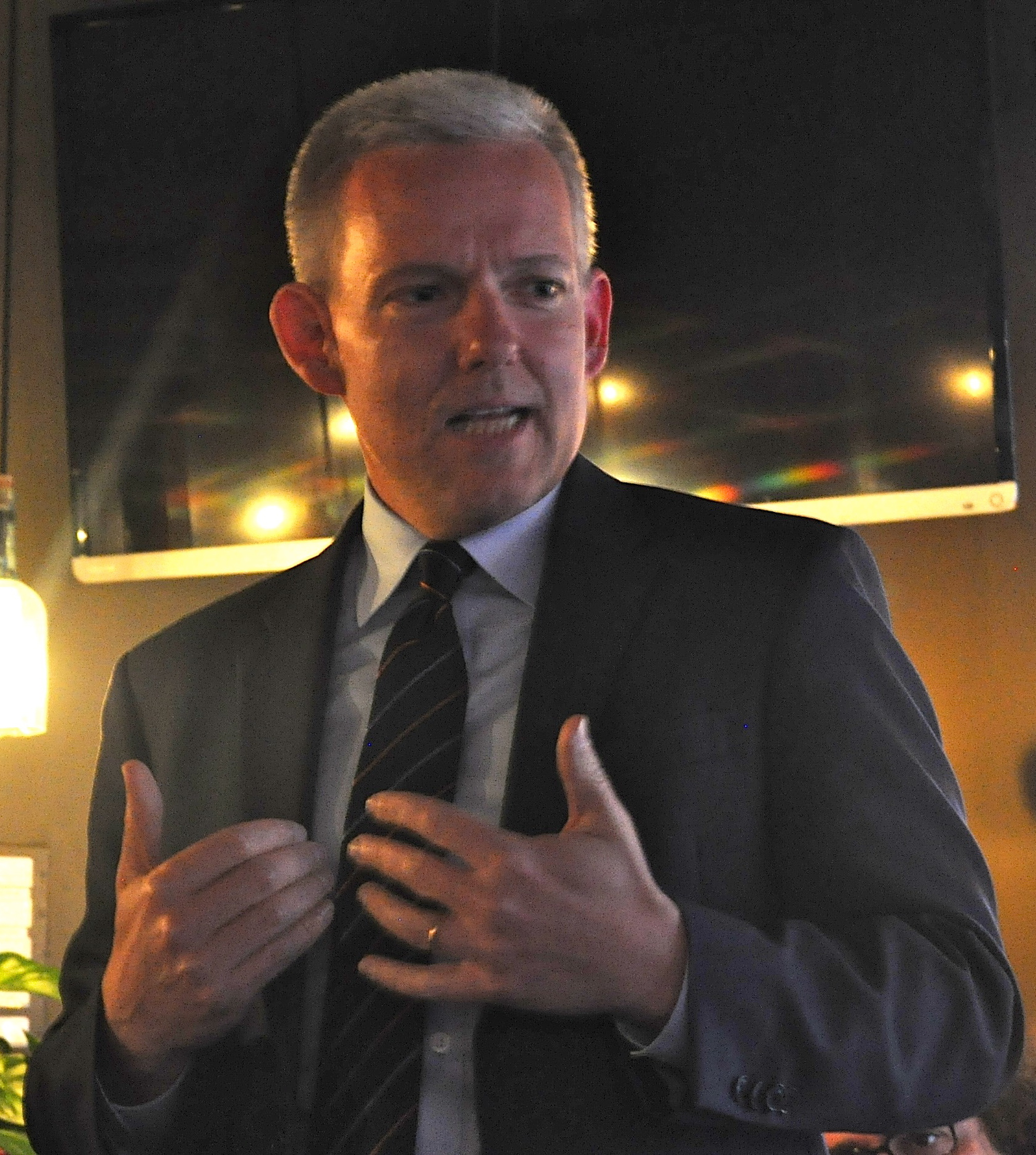
- Van Bramer in 2014

Majority Leader of the New York City Council
- In office January 8, 2014 – December 31, 2017
- Speaker: Melissa Mark-Viverito
- Preceded by: Joel Rivera
- Succeeded by: Laurie Cumbo

Member of the New York City Council from the 26th district
- In office January 1, 2010 – December 31, 2021
- Preceded by: Eric Gioia
- Succeeded by: Julie Won

Personal details
- Born: August 19, 1969 (age 57) Queens, New York, U.S.
- Party: Democratic
- Spouse: Dan Hendrick
- Education: St. John's University (BA)
- Website: Official website

James G. Van Bramer (born August 19, 1969) is an American politician and journalist who served in the New York City council from 2010 to 2021 as a Democrat. He represented the 26th district, which includes Astoria, Long Island City, Sunnyside, and Woodside in Queens. Van Bramer is a progressive who was one of the few members of the City Council to endorse Cynthia Nixon's campaign in the 2018 New York gubernatorial election.

== Early life and education ==
Van Bramer was born and grew up in the New York City borough of Queens, the son of retired active union members. His father, William Van Bramer, was a lifelong member of Printers' and Pressman's Union Local 2. His mother, Elizabeth, helped support the family by taking a variety of jobs in their neighborhood. She was a member of Local 1893 of the International Brotherhood of Painters.

Van Bramer grew up in Astoria, New York and graduated from William Cullen Bryant High School. In 1994, he graduated from St. Johns University. He majored in criminal justice and a minor in sociology.

== Career ==
Before joining the City Council, Van Bramer served as the Chief External Affairs Officer of the Queens Public Library. In this capacity, he was the library's link between community members and government.

He worked as a reporter for Lesbian and Gay New York (now Gay City News) a community newspaper, where he brought attention to the AIDS epidemic and bias/hate crimes. He represents his neighborhood and the 37th Assembly District on the New York State Democratic Committee.

In September 2007, he was named one of City & State's "40 under 40" for being a young influential member of New York City politics. Van Bramer currently lives in Sunnyside Gardens with his husband, Dan Hendrick. They married on July 28, 2012. Van Bramer is one of four openly LGBTQ+ members of the New York City Council, alongside Corey Johnson, Daniel Dromm and Carlos Menchaca.

In 2016, Van Bramer voted against a 100% affordable housing apartment building that would have had 209 homes affordable to people of low and moderate incomes. Van Bramer felt that preserving neighborhood character outweighed affordable housing as a priority for the site. The site is used as a surface parking lot, which would have disappeared if the project had been approved.

== New York City Council ==
Van Bramer was first elected to the New York City Council to represent the 26th district on November 3, 2009. He was re-elected in 2013. On January 22, 2014, Van Bramer was chosen to be the New York City Council's Majority Leader, the second-most powerful position in the body. He was also named to serve as co-chair of a budget negotiating team set up by Speaker Melissa Mark-Viverito.

He was elected to a third 4-year term on November 7, 2017, and reappointed to the budget negotiating team by Speaker Corey Johnson. Van Bramer was appointed to chair the council's Cultural Affairs, Libraries and International Relations Committee. He has served as chair of this committee throughout his tenure as a council member.

Election history
Location	Year	Election	Results
NYC Council District 25	2001	Democratic primary	√ Helen Sears 31.56% Jimmy Van Bramer 22.52% Rudolph E. Greco 21.76% Maqdalena U. Schultheis 13.50% Louis M. Chan 10.66%
NYC Council District 25	2001	General	√ Helen Sears 82.68% Magdalena U. Schultheis (I) 7.46% Jimmy Van Bramer (WF) 7.12% Barton Goft (Green) 2.73%
NYC Council District 26	2009	Democratic	√ Jimmy Van Bramer 45.99% Dierdre A. Feerick 37.29% Brent O'Leary 16.73%
NYC Council District 26	2009	General	√ Jimmy Van Bramer (D) 70.38% Angelo Maragos (R) 23.72% Dierdre A. Feerick (I) 5.90%
NYC Council District 26	2013	General	√ Jimmy Van Bramer (D) 99.70%
NYC Council District 26	2017	General	√ Jimmy Van Bramer (D) 85.0% Marvin Jeffcoat (R) 14.60% Write-ins 0.30%

== See also ==
- LGBT culture in New York City
- List of LGBT people from New York City
- Neighborhoods in Queens
- NYC Pride March

Political offices
Preceded by Eric Gioia	New York City Council, 26th district 2010–2021	Succeeded by Julie Won
