= Jeannette Gadson =

American politician

Jeannette Gadson (July 5, 1945 – February 13, 2007) was an American politician from New York.

== Life ==
She was born on July 5, 1945, to Jeanie Wright-Gadson and Samuel Gadson, Sr.

Jeannette Gadson entered politics as a Democrat, and became executive secretary to her uncle, Assemblyman Samuel D. Wright.

On November 4, 1975, she was elected to the New York State Assembly, to fill the vacancy caused by the resignation of Charles T. Hamilton. She took her seat in the 181st New York State Legislature later that month during a special session, and remained in the Assembly until the end of 1976. In September 1976, she challenged the incumbent Major Owens in the Democratic primary in the 17th State Senate District, but was defeated.

Afterwards she was a member of the 23rd District School Board, and District Manager of Brooklyn Community Board 16. In 1990, she was appointed to the New York City Board of Elections. In 1993, she was appointed by Brooklyn Borough President Howard Golden as his deputy. She resigned the post on March 31, 2001, and was appointed by Golden as a special assistant instead, because she planned to run later that year to succeed Golden as borough president and certain appointed public officials are barred from receiving campaign contributions under New York City election law. In September 2001, she ran in the Democratic primary for borough president, but was defeated by Marty Markowitz.

She died on February 13, 2007, of lung cancer, and was buried at the Talbird Cemetery in Hilton Head Island, South Carolina.

New York State Assembly
Preceded by Charles T. Hamilton	New York State Assembly; 54th District; 1975–1976	Succeeded by Thomas S. Boyland
