= 2001 New York City Public Advocate election =

- November 6, 2001
Candidate	Betsy Gotbaum	Joseph Dubowski
Party	Democratic	Conservative
Popular vote	845,924	56,647
Percentage	86.2%	5.8%
Public Advocate before election
Mark Green
Democratic
Elected Public Advocate
Betsy Gotbaum
Democratic

The 2001 New York City Public Advocate election took place on Tuesday, November 6, 2001, along with elections for mayor, the city comptroller, borough presidents, and members of the New York City Council. The seat was open because the incumbent, Mark Green, ran for mayor. The Democratic nominee, Betsy Gotbaum, won election with 86% of the vote against 5.8% for the Conservative nominee, Joseph Dubowski, 4.5% for Scott Stringer of the Liberal Party, and 3.5% combined for three other candidates.

The public advocate has the formal role of presiding over meetings of the New York City Council (although the speaker elected by the council itself now does much of this work), and, until the next election, would serve as acting mayor whenever the elected mayor is unable to serve.

== Candidates ==
=== Democratic party ===
Seven candidates appeared on the Democratic primary ballot: Betsy Gotbaum, a former Parks Commissioner and president of the New-York Historical Society; Norman Siegel, the former executive director of the New York Civil Liberties Union; Scott Stringer; Stephen DiBrienza; Willie Colon; Kathryn Freed; and Sheila Flaxman.

The primary was held on September 25, 2001. No candidate won the 40% needed to avoid a runoff, and Gotbaum and Siegel, the top two finishers, advanced to a runoff held on October 11, 2001. Gotbaum won the runoff with 63.9% of the vote.

=== Other parties ===
- Joseph Dubowski, Conservative Party
- Scott Stringer, Liberal Party
- Chris Launois, Marijuana Reform Party
- Travis Pahl, Libertarian Party
- Sheila Flaxman, Fusion

== Results ==
=== Democratic primary ===
Tuesday, September 25, 2001

Official results as reported by the New York City Campaign Finance Board:

2001 Democratic primary	Votes	%
Betsy Gotbaum	156,832	24.4%
Norman Siegel	105,985	16.5%
Stephen DiBrienza	102,338	15.9%
Willie Colon	101,424	15.8%
Scott Stringer	99,914	15.5%
Kathryn Freed	54,669	8.5%
Sheila Flaxman	21,550	3.4%
T O T A L	642,712	

As no candidate reached 40%, a runoff election between Gotbaum and Siegel was required.

=== Democratic run-off primary ===
Thursday, October 11, 2001

Official returns from the New York City Board of Elections:

2001 Democratic run-off primary	Manhattan	The Bronx	Brooklyn	Queens	Staten Island	Total	%
Betsy Gotbaum	121,400	71,829	122,781	96,365	14,752	427,127	63.9%
Betsy Gotbaum	63.9%	63.3%	63.0%	65.1%	66.6%	427,127	63.9%
Norman Siegel	68,454	41,576	72,150	51,551	7,401	241,132	36.1%
Norman Siegel	36.1%	36.7%	37.0%	34.9%	33.4%	241,132	36.1%
T O T A L	189,854	113,405	194,931	147,916	22,153	668,259	

Betsy Gotbaum became the Democratic nominee for public advocate.

=== General election ===
Tuesday, November 6, 2001

2001 general election	Party	Manhattan	The Bronx	Brooklyn	Queens	Staten Island	Total	%
Betsy Gotbaum	Democratic	243,083	108,804	244,963	205,881	43,193	845,924	86.2%
Betsy Gotbaum	Democratic	85.8%	89.8%	88.4%	85.7%	72.7%	845,924	86.2%
Joseph Dubowski	Conservative	11,312	4,523	12,110	17,959	10,743	56,647	5.8%
Joseph Dubowski	Conservative	4.0%	3.7%	4.4%	7.5%	18.1%	56,647	5.8%
Scott Stringer	Liberal	19,100	3,491	9,848	8,571	3,115	44,125	4.5%
Scott Stringer	Liberal	6.7%	2.9%	3.6%	3.6%	5.2%	44,125	4.5%
Chris Launois	Marijuana Reform	6,474	2,756	6,451	4,484	1,556	21,721	2.2%
Chris Launois	Marijuana Reform	2.3%	2.3%	2.3%	1.9%	2.6%	21,721	2.2%
Travis Pahl	Libertarian	1,948	817	1,624	1,672	559	6,620	0.7%
Travis Pahl	Libertarian	0.7%	0.7%	0.6%	0.7%	0.9%	6,620	0.7%
Sheila Flaxman	Fusion	1,341	779	2,066	1,579	241	6,006	0.6%
Sheila Flaxman	Fusion	0.5%	0.6%	0.7%	0.7%	0.4%	6,006	0.6%
Total scattering		28	17	3	12	11	71	0.01%
Total votes		283,286	121,187	277,065	240,158	59,418	981,114	

Source: Board of Elections in the City of New York

Betsy Gotbaum was elected public advocate.

== See also ==
- New York City Public Advocate
- Government of New York City
- 2001 New York City mayoral election
- 2001 New York City Comptroller election
