= 2005 New York City Public Advocate election =

- November 8, 2005
Candidate	Betsy Gotbaum	Jay Golub
Party	Democratic	Conservative
Popular vote	745,035	48,082
Percentage	90.0%	5.8%
Public Advocate before election
Betsy Gotbaum
Democratic
Elected Public Advocate
Betsy Gotbaum
Democratic

The 2005 New York City Public Advocate election took place on Tuesday, November 8, 2005, along with elections for mayor, the city comptroller, borough presidents, and members of the New York City Council. The Democratic incumbent, Betsy Gotbaum, won reelection with 90% of the vote against 5.8% for the Conservative nominee, Jay Golub, 2.1% for Jim Lesczynski of the Libertarian Party, and 2.1% for Bernard Goetz on the Rebuild line.

The public advocate has the formal role of presiding over meetings of the New York City Council (although the speaker elected by the council itself now does much of this work), and, until the next election, would serve as acting mayor whenever the elected mayor is unable to serve.

== Candidates ==
=== Democratic party ===
Gotbaum, who was first elected public advocate in 2001, sought a second term. She faced a contested Democratic primary against five challengers: Norman Siegel, the civil liberties lawyer who lost a runoff to Gotbaum in 2001; Andrew Rasiej; Michael E. Brown; Jay Golub; and Damon Cabbagestalk.

On September 13, 2005, Gotbaum won the Democratic primary with 48.6% of the vote to 30.5% for Siegel. Because Gotbaum cleared the 40% threshold, no runoff election was required.

=== Other parties ===
- Jay Golub, Conservative Party
- Jim Lesczynski, Libertarian Party
- Bernard Goetz, Rebuild

== Results ==
=== Democratic primary ===
Tuesday, September 13, 2005

Official results from the New York City Board of Elections, printed September 28, 2005:

2005 Democratic primary	Manhattan	The Bronx	Brooklyn	Queens	Staten Island	Total	%
Betsy Gotbaum	65,025	29,004	53,659	39,707	5,332	192,727	48.6%
Betsy Gotbaum	49.0%	46.0%	47.1%	51.9%	53.0%	192,727	48.6%
Norman Siegel	45,444	17,281	34,292	20,736	3,066	120,819	30.5%
Norman Siegel	34.2%	27.4%	30.1%	27.1%	30.5%	120,819	30.5%
Michael E. Brown	7,199	7,546	12,482	7,547	714	35,488	9.0%
Michael E. Brown	5.4%	12.0%	11.0%	9.9%	7.1%	35,488	9.0%
Andrew Rasiej	7,237	3,410	5,314	3,125	380	19,466	4.9%
Andrew Rasiej	5.5%	5.4%	4.7%	4.1%	3.8%	19,466	4.9%
Jay Golub	5,347	3,684	5,038	3,585	362	18,016	4.5%
Jay Golub	4.0%	5.8%	4.4%	4.7%	3.6%	18,016	4.5%
Damon L. Cabbagestalk	2,462	2,058	3,088	1,860	211	9,679	2.4%
Damon L. Cabbagestalk	1.9%	3.3%	2.7%	2.4%	2.1%	9,679	2.4%
all write-in votes	8	5	43	2	3	61	0.02%
T O T A L	132,722	62,988	113,916	76,562	10,068	396,256	

Gotbaum became the Democratic nominee for public advocate.

=== General election ===
Tuesday, November 8, 2005

2005 general election	Party	Manhattan	The Bronx	Brooklyn	Queens	Staten Island	Total	%
Betsy Gotbaum	Democratic	214,150	121,012	197,903	176,134	35,836	745,035	90.0%
Betsy Gotbaum	Democratic	91.0%	93.8%	90.6%	88.9%	76.5%	745,035	90.0%
Jay Golub	Conservative	10,708	4,186	11,141	14,423	7,624	48,082	5.8%
Jay Golub	Conservative	4.6%	3.2%	5.1%	7.3%	16.3%	48,082	5.8%
Bernard Goetz	Rebuild	4,320	2,338	4,631	3,843	2,125	17,257	2.1%
Bernard Goetz	Rebuild	1.8%	1.8%	2.1%	1.9%	4.5%	17,257	2.1%
Jim Lesczynski	Libertarian	6,034	1,516	4,569	3,795	1,225	17,139	2.1%
Jim Lesczynski	Libertarian	2.6%	1.2%	2.1%	1.9%	2.6%	17,139	2.1%
Total write-ins		121	9	106	26	7	269	0.03%
Total votes		235,333	129,061	218,350	198,221	46,817	827,782	

Source: Board of Elections in the City of New York

Betsy Gotbaum was reelected public advocate.

== See also ==
- New York City Public Advocate
- Government of New York City
- 2005 New York City mayoral election
- 2005 New York City Comptroller election
