= Prospect Plaza Houses =

Former public housing development in Brooklyn, New York

- NYCHA property
- Location within New York City
- Coordinates: 40.672720°N 73.917830°W
- Country: United States
- State: New York
- City: New York City
- Borough: Brooklyn
- ZIP codes: 11233
- Area codes: 718, 347, 929, and 917

The Prospect Plaza Houses was a 4.53-acre (18,300 m^{2}) complex owned by the New York City Housing Authority (NYCHA) in the Ocean Hill section of Brooklyn and was bordered by St. Marks and Sterling Place, Howard and Saratoga Avenues. It was the first NYCHA development to be fully demolished.

== Former development ==
Prospect Plaza Houses had four buildings, 12 and 15 stories tall with 368 apartments and approximately 1,171 residents. It was completed on June 30, 1974.

== Demolition ==
In 1999, NYCHA applied for a $21.4 million HOPE VI grant from the U.S. Department of Housing and Urban Development (HUD) to rebuild the complex after noting its deterioration. The proposed plan contained approximately 670 units, 323 of which are public housing rental units, 273 are non-public housing rental units and 37 are two-family homeowner units. The total project was anticipated to cost over $255 million.

Developer Michaels Development Company was hired in 2003 and the first building was torn down in 2005 and the New York City Housing Authority plans to demolish the other buildings and build new apartments as this would be cheaper than renovating the existing units. In 2007, NYCHA terminated its agreement with Michaels. Michaels sued the agency for $5.6 million for breach of contract.

Against federal guidelines, New York City amended its 2010 annual plan with HUD, after the public hearing. Instead of adding one building, it would tear down the entire development and replace it with 80 public housing rental units and add affordable housing.

In the summer of 2014, the other three buildings were torn down and new buildings are currently being built. Construction has started on the buildings on Prospect Place. The buildings are set to be completed in the summer/fall of 2016.

=== Residents reactions ===
Over 1,000 residents were displaced and were scattered around the city with the last of the tenants leaving in 2003, costing taxpayers roughly $6 million. According to reports the deal offered residents of Prospect Plaza Houses temporary townhouse styled housing while their apartments were renovated. Many of these residents were instead given vouchers to alternative Section 8 housing. Many former residents have expressed dissatisfaction with what they claim was an unfair deal to remove them in order for the city to turn the buildings into condominiums and bring in more money.

== New development ==
Construction of the new development finished in 2017 with 284 apartments. 80 units are being managed by NYCHA, while the rest for households making no more than 60% of the Area Median Income. The development was designed by Dattner Architects.

== Notable residents ==
- Latrice Walker, New York State Assembly member

== See also ==
- New York City Housing Authority
