= Julie Won =

American politician (born 1990)

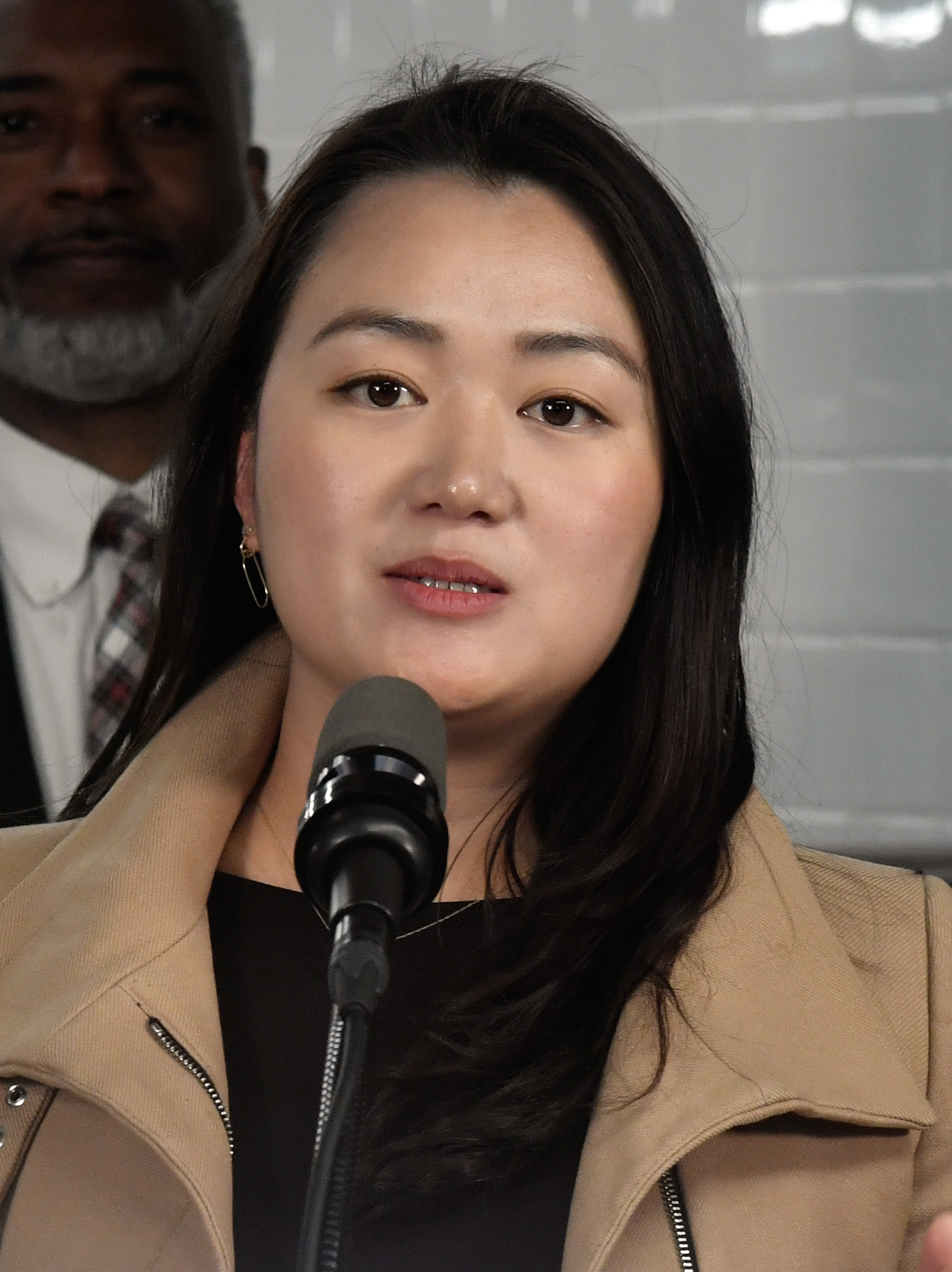

Member of the New York City Council from the 26th district
- Incumbent
- Assumed office January 1, 2022
- Preceded by: Jimmy Van Bramer

Personal details
- Born: April 17, 1990 (age 36) South Korea
- Party: Democratic
- Spouse: Eugene Noh
- Education: Syracuse University (BA)
- Website: Official website Campaign website

Julie Jaehee Won (born April 17, 1990) is a Korean-American politician. She is a member of the New York City Council for the 26th district, which covers the western Queens neighborhoods of Sunnyside, Long Island City, Woodside, and Astoria. She chairs the Committee on Workforce Development.

== Early life and career ==
Won was born in South Korea and immigrated with her family to the United States in 1998, when she was eight years old. Her parents, who had left their jobs in South Korea after the 1997 Asian financial crisis, both worked in local small businesses. She grew up in Long Island and attended George W. Hewlett High School. Won received her undergraduate degree from the Maxwell School of Citizenship and Public Affairs at Syracuse University.

Prior to entering politics, Won worked as a consultant and a federal client relationship representative at IBM in Washington, D.C. While in DC, she served on the Mayor of the District of Columbia's Office on Asian & Pacific Islander Affairs. After moving to NYC, in June 2020, acting Queens Borough President Sharon Lee appointed Won to Queens Community Board 2.

== Political career ==
=== 2021 city council campaign ===
In October 2020, Won announced her 2021 campaign for the 26th district of the New York City Council, held by term-limited Democrat Jimmy Van Bramer. Won had been serving as a member of Queens Community Board 2 for most of the year, and cited the difficulties her family faced due to the COVID-19 pandemic as the reason for her campaign. Won emphasized her work in the technology sector and her support for citywide free WiFi.

Won faced 14 other candidates in the Democratic primary, many of whom also ran on progressive platforms, with no clear frontrunner among them. In part because of the size and volatility of the field, many would-be endorsers chose to remain on the sidelines, while others – including Van Bramer and the influential Working Families Party – coalesced around New York City Census deputy director Amit Singh Bagga.

On election night, Won finished neck-and-neck with Bagga, receiving 18.5% of the vote to Bagga's 17.7%; every other candidate lagged behind in the single digits. Won received a major boost, however, when absentee ballots and ranked-choice votes were counted, and prevailed over Bagga 57-43% in the 15th round of ranked-choice tabulation; she formally declared victory on July 6. She faced minimal opposition in the November general election, and won easily.

=== Subsequent City Council elections ===
Won won re-election in 2023 and 2025.

=== Actions as Councilmember ===
Won supports intersection daylighting and more control by the City Council over appointments to neighborhood Community Boards. The New York League of Conservation Voters rated Won 100 percent on their environmental scorecard in 2024 and 2025. Won is skeptical of the proposed Sunnyside Yards development project, arguing that poor soil quality and existing train infrastructure make the project less cost-effective than other ways to address housing shortages.

=== 2025 mayoral election ===
She endorsed Zohran Mamdani in the 2025 New York City Democratic mayoral primary. Her husband, Eugene Noh, who managed the re-election campaign of Staten Island congressman Max Rose, was hired as the campaign manager for Eric Adams's embattled re-election campaign. In an unusual arrangement, Noh's hiring had been facilitated by right-wing hedge fund managers Ken Griffin and Daniel S. Loeb.

=== 2026 congressional campaign ===
2026 Democratic primary results by precinct Valdez: 30–40%; 40–50%; 50–60%; 60–70%; 70–80%; 80–90%; 90–100%; Reynoso: 30–40%; 40–50%; 50–60%; 60–70%; 70–80%; 80–90%; 90–100%; Won: 30–40%; 40–50%; Tie: 30–40%; 40–50%

In February 2026, Won announced her candidacy for the United States House of Representatives to represent New York's 7th congressional district, after incumbent Nydia Velázquez announced she would retire. Won was endorsed by state Senator John C. Liu, state Assemblyman Ron Kim, and New York City Councilwoman Shanel Thomas-Henry.

Won's campaign centered on establishing universal paid leave, securing affordable childcare, expanding access to universal healthcare, and systematically improving the care economy. Won was the only candidate in the primary field to answer a questionnaire from the cryptocurrency industry lobby, supporting their policy priorities. By March, Won had raised $644,604 in campaign contributions.

Won's former landlord claimed in court eviction documents that she owed $25,000 in unpaid rent from a previous luxury apartment rental, which she denied owing.

Won finished third in the June primary, receiving 6.3% of the vote. She trailed state Assemblymember Claire Valdez, who won the race with 56.1%, and Brooklyn borough president Antonio Reynoso, who finished second with 35.8%.

== Personal life ==
Won used to live in Sunnyside, Queens and now lives in Long Island City, with her husband, Eugene Noh, campaign manager for Eric Adams' re-election bid in 2025 and an alum of Max Rose's campaign team.

== Electoral history ==
=== 2026 ===
97.51% reporting

2026 United States House of Representatives Democratic primary in New York, District 7
| Party | Candidate | Votes | % |
|---|---|---|---|
| Democratic | Claire Valdez | 37,531 | 56.1 |
| Democratic | Antonio Reynoso | 23,960 | 35.8 |
| Democratic | Julie Won | 4,231 | 6.3 |
| Democratic | Vichal Kumar | 1,134 | 1.7 |
| Write-in | | 97 | 0.1 |
| Total votes | | 66,953 | 100.0 |

=== 2025 ===
2025 New York City Council election, District 26
| Party | Candidate | Votes | % |
|---|---|---|---|
| Democratic | Julie Won (incumbent) | 33,425 | 81.4 |
| Republican | John Patrick Healy | 6,607 | 16.1 |
| Conservative | John Patrick Healy | 891 | 2.2 |
| Total | John Patrick Healy | 7,498 | 18.3 |
| Write-in | | 152 | 0.4 |
| Total votes | | 41,075 | 100.0 |
| Democratic hold | | | |

=== 2023 ===
2023 New York City Council Democratic primary, District 26
| Party | Candidate | Votes | % |
|---|---|---|---|
| Democratic | Julie Won (incumbent) | 3,701 | 60.9 |
| Democratic | Hailie Kim | 2,298 | 37.8 |
| Write-in | | 76 | 1.3 |
| Total votes | | 6,075 | 100.0 |

2023 New York City Council election, District 26
| Party | Candidate | Votes | % |
|---|---|---|---|
| Democratic | Julie Won | 6,930 | 64.7 |
| Working Families | Julie Won | 1,524 | 14.2 |
| Total | Julie Won (incumbent) | 8,454 | 78.9 |
| Republican | Marvin R. Jeffcoat | 2,020 | 18.9 |
| Medical Freedom | Marvin R. Jeffcoat | 118 | 1.1 |
| Total | Marvin R. Jeffcoat | 2,138 | 20.0 |
| Write-in | | 119 | 1.1 |
| Total votes | | 10,711 | 100.0 |
| Democratic hold | | | |

=== 2021 ===
2021 New York City Council Democratic primary, District 26
| Party | Candidate | Maximum round | Maximum votes | Share in maximum round | Maximum votes First round votes Transfer votes |
|---|---|---|---|---|---|
| Democratic | Julie Won | 15 | 6,822 | 56.7% | |
| Democratic | Amit S. Bagga | 15 | 5,211 | 43.3% | |
| Democratic | Brent O'Leary | 14 | 3,150 | 22.7% | |
| Democratic | Julia L. Forman | 13 | 2,705 | 17.9% | |
| Democratic | Ebony R. Young | 12 | 1,807 | 11.4% | |
| Democratic | Denise M. Keehan-Smith | 11 | 1,533 | 9.4% | |
| Democratic | Badrun Khan | 10 | 1,340 | 8.0% | |
| Democratic | Hailie Kim | 9 | 1,166 | 6.9% | |
| Democratic | Jonathan Bailey | 8 | 1,002 | 5.8% | |
| Democratic | Glennis E. Gomez | 7 | 733 | 4.2% | |
| Democratic | Emily E. Sharpe | 6 | 679 | 3.9% | |
| Democratic | Jesse Laymon | 5 | 609 | 3.5% | |
| Democratic | Steven B. Raga | 4 | 570 | 3.2% | |
| Democratic | Lorenzo Brea | 3 | 368 | 2.1% | |
| Democratic | Sultan Al Maruf | 2 | 295 | 1.7% | |
| Write-In | | 1 | 46 | 0.3% | |

2021 New York City Council election, District 26
| Party | Candidate | Votes | % |
|---|---|---|---|
| Democratic | Julie Won | 15,398 | 77.3 |
| Republican | Marvin R. Jeffcoat | 3,842 | 19.3 |
| Conservative | Marvin R. Jeffcoat | 561 | 2.8 |
| Total | Marvin R. Jeffcoat | 4,403 | 22.1 |
| Write-in | | 107 | 0.5 |
| Total votes | | 19,908 | 100.0 |
| Democratic hold | | | |

== See also ==
- Korean Americans in New York City
