= Walter Harte (clergyman) =

Reverend Canon William Harte
- Reverend Canon William Harte
- Born: 28 October 1650
- Died: 2 February 1735 (aged 84); Kintbury, Berkshire

Reverend Canon Walter Harte (1650–1735) was a clergyman and Prebendary of Bath and Wells and was a principal pillar of the Nonjuring schism cause.

== Education ==
Son of Walter Harte, he was educated at John Roysse's Free School in Abingdon, (now Abingdon School) (1662–1667). His later education was as a scholar at Pembroke College, Oxford where he earned a B.A (1671) and M.A and fellow (1674).

== Career ==
In 1676 he was incorporated into Cambridge and ordained by Dr Fell. He became Prebendary of Bath and Wells from 1677 to 1691 and the vicar of St Mary Magdalene, Taunton and Canon of Bristol from 1684 to 1691.

He refused to take the Nonjuring schism oaths after the Glorious Revolution, which resulted in him being deprived of all of his preferments. Unusually his three successors all agreed that he receive the benefits of his prebend until death and he was regarded as a principal pillar of the nonjuring cause.

He was a Tesdale Usher at Abingdon School from 1692 to 1703 and his son Walter Harte was born in 1709. He retired to Kintbury, where he died in 1735.

== See also ==
- List of Old Abingdonians
