= Walter Harte =

English poet and historian

- Born: 1709
- Died: March 1774 (aged 64–65)

Walter Harte (1709–1774) was an English poet and historian. He was a friend of Alexander Pope, Oxford don, canon of Windsor, and vice-principal of St. Mary's Hall, Oxford.

The son of the Reverend Walter Harte, a fellow of Pembroke College, Oxford, prebendary of Wells, canon of Bristol, and vicar of St. Mary Magdalen, Taunton, Somerset, the young Harte was educated at Marlborough Grammar School and St Mary Hall, Oxford, where he graduated BA in 1728 and proceeded MA in 1731.

In 1750 he was appointed Canon of the third stall at St George's Chapel, Windsor Castle, a position he held until 1774.

== Works ==
- Poems on several occasions (1727)
- An essay on reason.; 2nd ed. 1735
- An essay on satire, particularly on the Duncaid (1730)
- Essays on husbandry. (1764)
- The amaranth; or, Religious poems (1767)
- The history of the life of Gustavus Adolphus, king of Sweden
- The reasonableness and advantage of national humiliations, upon the approach of war (1740)
- The union and harmony of reason, morality, and revealed religion.
