= Latrice Walker =

American politician

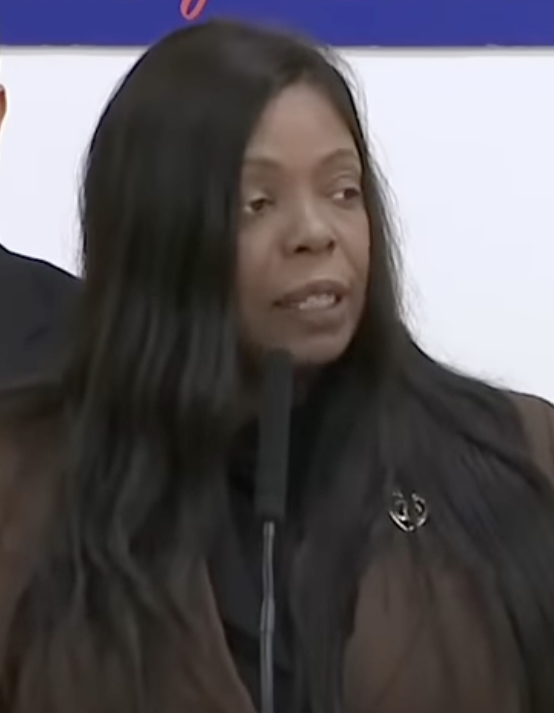
- Walker in 2026

Member of the New York State Assembly from the 55th district
- Incumbent
- Assumed office January 1, 2015
- Preceded by: William Boyland Jr.

Personal details
- Born: August 13, 1979 (age 47) New York City, New York, U.S.
- Party: Democratic
- Education: State University of New York, Purchase (BA); Pace University (JD)
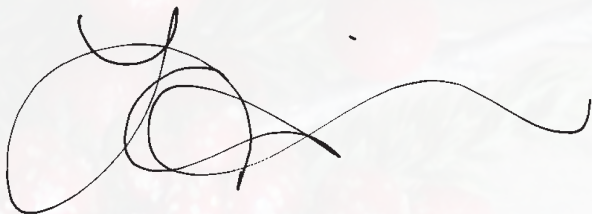
- Signature
- Website: State Assembly website

Latrice Monique Walker is an American politician. A Democrat, she represents District 55 in the New York State Assembly. The district includes portions of Brownsville in Brooklyn.

== Life and career ==
Walker was born and raised in Ocean Hill, Brooklyn in Prospect Plaza Houses, a NYCHA development. She attended New York City Public Schools, including Brooklyn Technical High School, prior to receiving her bachelor's degree at SUNY Purchase College, and her J.D. from Pace University.

Prior to her election to the assembly, Walker served as chief counsel to United States Congresswoman Yvette Clarke, who represents much of the same area in Congress. Currently, she resides in Ocean Hill-Brownsville with her daughter, Nile.

Walker is an active member of Zeta Phi Beta sorority.

== New York Assembly ==
In 2014, Assemblyman William F. Boyland Jr. was found guilty of corruption and was therefore forced to resign. As a result, the seat became open and Walker as well as six others entered the race. In a seven-way primary, Walker secured the nomination with just under 40% of the vote. She would easily win the general election.

Walker was sworn into office on January 1, 2015.
