= Walter R. Hart =

Judge for Brooklyn and Staten Island (1894–1969)

Walter R. Hart (February 27, 1894 – June 17, 1969) was an American judge for the Second Judicial District (Kings and Richmond Counties).

== Early life and education ==
Hart was born on February 27, 1894, in Ocean Hill, Brooklyn neighborhood. He attended a local high school which he left at the age of 13 to work as a law clerk. Later, he earned Regents credits at East New York Preparatory School and graduating from the Fordham University School of Law in 1916. He joined the United States Marine Corps the following year.

== Career ==
Between 1925 and 1937, he was a Brooklyn member of the Board of Aldermen.

As a lawyer, Hart represented building trade unions and bus lines, and served as an impartial adviser in a 1953 transit dispute.

Hart was also a councilman. He led a 1946 council committee investigating racial discrimination in the city. The report, which unveiled discrimination against Jewish, African American, and Italian-American students in post-graduate medical schools, was adopted by the council and President Truman's Commission on Civil Rights.

Hart also contributed to his community as president of the Hebrew Educational Society of Brooklyn from 1949 to 1951.

== Death ==
Hart died from a heart ailment at Brooklyn Jewish Hospital and Medical Center, at age 75.
