= Thomas S. Boyland =

American politician

Member of the New York State Assembly from the 54th district
- In office January 1, 1977 – February 7, 1982
- Preceded by: Jeannette Gadson
- Succeeded by: William F. Boyland
- Constituency: Bushwick, Brooklyn, New York City

Personal details
- Born: August 13, 1942 Memphis, Tennessee, U.S.
- Died: February 7, 1982 (aged 39) Hilton Head Island, South Carolina, U.S.
- Party: Democratic
- Education: Philander Smith College

Thomas S. Boyland (August 13, 1942 – February 7, 1982) was an American politician from New York.

== Life ==
Boyland was born on August 13, 1942, in Memphis, Tennessee, the son of Theodore Boyland and Ora Boyland. He graduated B.A. in mathematics from Philander Smith College. Then he went with the Peace Corps to East Africa, teaching in Zambia for some years. After his return, he attended Hunter College, Syracuse University and New York University. While studying for a master's degree, beginning in 1967, he taught mathematics at high schools in New York City. He married Linda, and they had three sons.

He entered politics as a Democrat, and was a member of the New York State Assembly from 1977 until his death in 1982, sitting in the 182nd, 183rd and 184th New York State Legislatures.

He died on February 7, 1982, during a meeting of the National Black Caucus of State Legislators on Hilton Head Island, South Carolina.

He was succeeded in the Assembly by his brother William F. Boyland, and then by his nephew William Boyland, Jr.

In Brooklyn, Thomas Boyland Park, Thomas S. Boyland School (also known as PS 73), and Thomas S. Boyland Street (renamed from Hopkinson Avenue) were named in his honor.

New York State Assembly
Preceded by Jeannette Gadson	New York State Assembly; 54th District; 1977–1982	Succeeded by William F. Boyland
