= William Boyland Jr. =

American politician

William F. Boyland, Jr.

Member of the New York State Assembly from the 55th district
- In office 2003 – March 6, 2014
- Preceded by: William F. Boyland
- Succeeded by: Latrice Walker

Personal details
- Born: September 9, 1970 (age 55)
- Party: Democratic

William Frank Boyland Jr. (born September 9, 1970) is an American former politician and convicted felon from the state of New York. A Democrat, Boyland represented District 55 (Brooklyn) in the New York State Assembly and was first elected in a 2003 special election. He succeeded his father, William F. Boyland Sr., in the seat. He forfeited his Assembly seat on March 6, 2014 due to his conviction on 21 federal felony counts related to extortion, bribery, and official corruption, and in 2015 was sentenced to 14 years in prison. In December 2024, his sentence was commuted by President Joe Biden.

== Early life and family ==
William Frank Boyland Jr. was born on September 9, 1970. He came from a prominent Brooklyn political family: his uncle, Thomas S. Boyland, represented the 54th district in the New York State Assembly from 1977 until his death in 1982; his father, William F. Boyland Sr., held seats in the Assembly from 1982 to 2003; and his sister, Tracy L. Boyland, served on the New York City Council from 1998 to 2005. A street, a public school, and a park in Brooklyn are named after Thomas S. Boyland.

Prior to his election to the assembly, Boyland served as an intern in the offices of several United States Congressmen, including those of fellow Brooklynites Edolphus Towns and Major Owens.

== Assembly career ==
Boyland was first elected to the Assembly in a 2003 special election, succeeding his father, who had resigned the seat in January 2003. He represented the 55th district, which covers the Brooklyn neighborhoods of Ocean Hill, Brownsville, Bedford–Stuyvesant, Crown Heights, and Bushwick. During the 2013–2014 legislative session he sat on the Assembly's committees on Housing, Economic Development, Local Government, Banking, and Aging. Following his conviction and removal from office, he was succeeded by Latrice Walker, who took office on January 1, 2015.

== Criminal proceedings ==
On March 10, 2011, Boyland was among eight individuals (including State Senator Carl Kruger) who surrendered to face charges in a federal corruption case accusing the lawmakers of taking bribes over the course of a decade. On November 10, 2011, Boyland was acquitted of those charges. Before the end of the month, he was arrested again on separate federal bribery charges, with prosecutors claiming to have secretly recorded him soliciting $250,000 in bribes even while the first set of charges was still unresolved. Boyland's chief of staff, Ry-Ann Hermon, was also arrested on related charges, and eventually pleaded guilty. On March 8, 2013, Boyland was charged with three additional counts of mail fraud for falsely securing tens of thousands of dollars in travel reimbursements. Several weeks later, another fraud charge was added for steering taxpayer money to a nonprofit agency and directing that agency to reimburse him for other expenses. On May 14, 2013, Boyland pleaded not guilty.

On March 6, 2014, Boyland was convicted of all 21 felony counts he faced, including extortion, bribery, and mail fraud (Eastern District of New York, docket no. 11-CR-850). Upon conviction, Boyland immediately lost his seat in the Assembly. In September 2015, he was sentenced to 14 years in federal prison; less than the 19 years sought by prosecuters, but more than the sentences received by other state lawmakers convicted of corruption-related charges. As of August 2016, he was serving his sentence at the Federal Correctional Institution, Loretto, a low-security federal prison in Western Pennsylvania.

In February 2021, Boyland was granted a compassionate release to home confinement after serving less than half his sentence, on account of the COVID-19 pandemic. On December 12, 2024, his sentence was commuted by President Joe Biden, one of 1,583 people granted clemency by the outgoing administration that day.

== See also ==
- List of people pardoned or granted clemency by the president of the United States

New York State Assembly
Preceded by William F. Boyland	New York State Assembly; 55th District; 2003–2014	Succeeded by Latrice Walker
