= Brooklyn Community Board 16 =

Brooklyn Community District 16
- Community District
- Country: United States
- State: New York
- City: New York City
- Borough: Brooklyn
- Neighborhoods: List: Brownsville; Ocean Hill

Government
  - Chairperson: Genese Morgan
  - District Manager: Viola D. Greene-Walker

Area
  - Total: 1.9 sq mi (4.9 km^{2})

Population (2020)
  - Total: 98,506 ▲
  - Density: 52,000/sq mi (20,000/km^{2})

Ethnicity
  - Black: 67.4%
  - Hispanic and Latino (any race): 22.0%
  - Others: 5.8%
  - White: 3.4%
  - Asian: 1.4%
- Time zone: UTC−5 (Eastern)
  - Summer (DST): UTC−4 (EDT)
- ZIP Codes: 11212 and 11233
- Area code: 718, 347, 929, and 917
- Police Precincts: 73rd (website)
- Website: www1.nyc.gov/site/brooklyncb16/index.page

Brooklyn Community Board 16 is a New York City community board that encompasses the Brooklyn neighborhoods of Brownsville and Ocean Hill. It is delimited by East 98th street, East New York Avenue, Ralph Avenue, Atlantic Avenue and Saratoga Avenue on the west, Broadway on the north, Van Sinderen Avenue on the east, as well as by the Long Island Rail Road on the south.

Its current chairperson is Genese Morgan, and its district manager Viola D. Greene-Walker. The Community Board #16's Office is located at 444 Thomas S. Boyland Street.

On a daily basis, the District Office staff monitors all complaints from community residents and works with the Mayor's Office, Borough President's Office, and City agencies to resolve local complaints; i.e., potholes, street light outages, water leaks, refuse collection, housing, heat and hot water complaints, demolition and seal-up of abandoned buildings, pest control, lot cleaning, human resources, and youth programs. The staff also follows-up on the business of the Board and its committees.

The District Manager convenes a District Service Cabinet composed of all local service agency chiefs within the confines of Community District #16. The Cabinet members interface with each other on specific projects in the district and follow up on individual complaints of the community. The Cabinet members provide invaluable assistance to the District Manager as it relates to the delivery of City services to the residents of Community District #16.

The land area is 1,230.6 acres (4.980 km^{2}).

== Demographics ==
Historical population
Census	Pop.	Note	%±
1990	84,923		—
2000	85,343		0.5%
2010	86,468		1.3%
2020	98,506		13.9%
U.S. Decennial Census

Population by race as of 2010 and 2020 censuses:
Race	2010		2020	
Black	65,930	76.25%	66,418	67.42%
White	858	0.99%	3,347	3.40%
Asian	604	0.70%	1,331	1.35%
Other	583	0.67%	1,145	1.16%
Multiracial	1,124	1.30%	4,556	4.62%
Hispanic (any race)	17,369	20.09%	21,709	22.04%
Total	86,468	100%	98,506	100%

As of the 2010 United States census, the Community Board has a population of 86,468, up from 85,343 in 2000 and 84,923 in 1990.

Of them (as of 2010), 858 (1.0%) are White non Hispanic, 65,930 (76.2%) are African-American, 620 (0.7%) Asian or Pacific Islander, 287 (0.3%) American Indian or Native Alaskan, 280 (0.3%) of some other race, 1,124 (1.3%) of two or more race, 17,369 (20.1%) of Hispanic origins. 55.2% of the population benefited from public assistance in 2012, including 31.9% who receive Medicaid only.

The entirety of Community Board 14, which comprises Flatbush and Midwood, had 165,543 inhabitants as of NYC Health's 2018 Community Health Profile, with an average life expectancy of 82.4 years. This is slightly higher than the median life expectancy of 81.2 for all New York City neighborhoods. Most inhabitants are middle-aged adults and youth: 25% are between the ages of 0–17, 29% between 25–44, and 24% between 45–64. The ratio of college-aged and elderly residents was lower, at 9% and 13% respectively.

As of 2016, the median household income in Community Board 14 was $56,599. In 2018, an estimated 22% of Flatbush and Midwood residents lived in poverty, compared to 21% in all of Brooklyn and 20% in all of New York City. One in eleven residents (9%) were unemployed, compared to 9% in the rest of both Brooklyn and New York City. Rent burden, or the percentage of residents who have difficulty paying their rent, is 57% in Flatbush and Midwood, higher than the citywide and boroughwide rates of 52% and 51% respectively.
