= William F. Boyland =

American politician

Member of the New York State Assembly from the 55th district
- In office January 1, 1983 – January 2003
- Preceded by: Thomas R. Fortune
- Succeeded by: William Boyland Jr.

Member of the New York State Assembly from the 54th district
- In office April 20, 1982 – December 31, 1982
- Preceded by: Thomas S. Boyland
- Succeeded by: Thomas F. Catapano

Personal details
- Party: Democratic

William Frank Boyland was a New York Assemblyman from 1982 to 2003. In January 2003, he resigned his seat, and his son William Boyland, Jr. was elected to fill the vacancy.

Assemblyman Thomas S. Boyland was his brother. The influential family has been described as a dynasty.

New York State Assembly
Preceded by Thomas S. Boyland	New York State Assembly; 54th District; 1982	Succeeded by Thomas F. Catapano
Preceded by Thomas R. Fortune	New York State Assembly; 55th District; 1983–2003	Succeeded by William Boyland Jr.
