= 2001 New York City Comptroller election =

- November 6, 2001
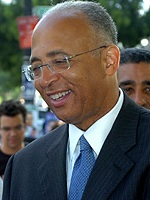

Candidate	Bill Thompson	Herbert Berman	John Demic
Party	Democratic	Liberal	Conservative
Alliance	Working Families
Popular vote	796,166	63,343	58,383
Percentage	83.92%	6.68%	6.15%
- Results by State Assembly district Thompson: 50–60% 60–70% 70–80% 80–90% >90%
Comptroller before election
Alan Hevesi
Democratic
Elected Comptroller
Bill Thompson
Democratic

The 2001 New York City Comptroller election took place on November 6, 2001, to elect the comptroller of New York City. The election was held concurrently with the races for mayor and public advocate.

The incumbent comptroller, Alan Hevesi, was term-limited and could not seek re-election, instead choosing to run for mayor. The election resulted in the victory of Bill Thompson, the former president of the New York City Board of Education, who became the first African American to hold the office.

== Background ==
The 2001 election cycle was the first to be impacted by the city's new term limit laws, which forced a massive turnover in city government. Along with the comptroller, the mayor, public advocate, and dozens of City Council members were barred from seeking re-election.

The primary election was originally scheduled for September 11, 2001. Due to the terrorist attacks on the World Trade Center that morning, the primary was suspended and rescheduled for September 25.

== Democratic primary ==
=== Campaign ===
Most state legislators from New York City, along with some federal congressmen, endorsed Bill Thompson, a former president of the New York City Board of Education. Most of the New York City Council endorsed Herbert Berman, who was himself a councilmember.

=== Candidates ===
- Bill Thompson, president of the Board of Education and former investment banker
- Herbert Berman, city councilmember

=== Results ===
Candidate	Party	Votes	%
William C. Thompson Jr.	Democratic	315,683	54.9%
Herbert Berman	Democratic	258,958	45.1%

Democratic primary by State Assembly district

== General election ==
In the general election, Thompson faced Berman, now running on the Liberal Party line, once again, as well as Conservative nominee John Demic. Thompson was seen as the heavy favorite in a city where registered Democrats vastly outnumber Republicans. Thompson ended up winning with 83.92% of the vote.

Candidate	Party/Line	Votes	% of candidate votes
William C. Thompson Jr.	Democratic + Working Families	796,166	83.92%
Herbert E. Berman	Liberal	63,343	6.68%
John J. D'Emic	Conservative	58,383	6.15%
Tracy L. Blevins	Marijuana Reform	17,340	1.83%
Joseph D. Fusco	Fusion	6,938	0.73%
James Eisert	Libertarian	6,638	0.70%
Total		948,808	100.00%

== Aftermath ==
Thompson was sworn in on January 1, 2002. He became the first African American to serve as city comptroller. He served two terms before running for mayor in 2009, where he narrowly lost to Michael Bloomberg. His tenure was marked by a focus on pension fund performance and auditing city agencies during the post-9/11 economic recovery.
