= New York City's 26th City Council district =

- Boundaries following the 2020 census

Government
  - Councilmember: Julie Won (D–Sunnyside)

Population (2010)
  - Total: 161,419

Demographics
  - Hispanic: 36%
  - White: 28%
  - Asian: 27%
  - Black: 6%
  - Other: 3%

Registration
  - Democratic: 65.6%
  - Republican: 8.6%
  - No party preference: 22.7%
- Registered voters (2021) 106,058

New York City's 26th City Council district is one of 51 districts in the New York City Council. It has been represented by Democrat Julie Won since 2022. She replaced former councilman Jimmy Van Bramer who was term-limited and ran unsuccessfully for Queens Borough President.

== Geography ==
District 26 covers the westernmost neighborhoods of Queens along the East River, including Long Island City, Sunnyside, southern Astoria, and northern Woodside.

The district overlaps with Queens Community Boards 1 and 2, and with New York's 6th, 12th, and 14th congressional districts. It also overlaps with the 12th, 13th, and 16th districts of the New York State Senate, and with the 30th, 34th, 36th, 37th, and 39th districts of the New York State Assembly.

== Recent election results ==
=== 2025 ===
2025 New York City Council election, District 26
Party	Candidate	Votes	%
Democratic	Julie Won (incumbent)	33,425	81.4
Republican	John Healy	6,607	
Conservative	John Healy	891	
Total	John Healy	7,498	18.3
Write-in		152	0.3
Total votes		41,075	100.0
Democratic hold			

=== 2023 (redistricting) ===
Due to redistricting and the 2020 changes to the New York City Charter, councilmembers elected during the 2021 and 2023 City Council elections will serve two-year terms, with full four-year terms resuming after the 2025 New York City Council elections.

2023 New York City Council election, District 26
Primary election
Party	Candidate	Votes	%
Democratic	Julie Won (incumbent)	3,701	60.9
Democratic	Hailie Kim	2,298	37.8
Write-in		76	1.3
Total votes		6,075	100.0
General election
Democratic	Julie Won	6,930	
Working Families	Julie Won	1,524	
Total	Julie Won (incumbent)	8,454	78.9
Republican	Marvin Jeffcoat	2,020	
Medical Freedom	Marvin Jeffcoat	118	
Total	Marvin Jeffcoat	2,138	20.0
Write-in		119	1.1
Total votes		10,711	100.0
Democratic hold			

=== 2021 ===
In 2019, voters in New York City approved Ballot Question 1, which implemented ranked-choice voting in all local elections. Under the new system, voters have the option to rank up to five candidates for every local office. Voters whose first-choice candidates fare poorly will have their votes redistributed to other candidates in their ranking until one candidate surpasses the 50 percent threshold. If one candidate surpasses 50 percent in first-choice votes, then ranked-choice tabulations will not occur.

2021 New York City Council election, District 26 Democratic primary
Party	Candidate	Maximum round	Maximum votes	Share in maximum round	Maximum votes First round votes Transfer votes
Democratic	Julie Won	15	6,822	56.7%	
Democratic	Amit Bagga	15	5,211	43.3%	
Democratic	Brent O'Leary	14	3,150	22.7%	
Democratic	Julia Forman	13	2,705	17.9%	
Democratic	Ebony Young	12	1,807	11.4%	
Democratic	Denise Keehan-Smith	11	1,533	9.4%	
Democratic	Badrun Khan	10	1,340	8.0%	
Democratic	Hailie Kim	9	1,166	6.9%	
Democratic	Jonathan Bailey	8	1,002	5.8%	
Democratic	Glennis Gomez	7	733	4.2%	
Democratic	Emily Sharpe	6	679	3.9%	
Democratic	Jesse Laymon	5	609	3.5%	
Democratic	Steven Raga	4	570	3.2%	
Democratic	Lorenzo Brea	3	368	2.1%	
Democratic	Sultan Maruf	2	295	1.7%	
Write-in		1	46	0.3%	

An interactive map of District 26

2021 New York City Council election, District 26 general election
Party	Candidate	Votes	%
Democratic	Julie Won	15,398	77.3
Republican	Marvin Jeffcoat	3,842	
Conservative	Marvin Jeffcoat	561	
Total	Marvin Jeffcoat	4,403	22.1
Write-in		106	0.6
Total votes		19,907	100
Democratic hold			

=== 2017 ===
2017 New York City Council election, District 26
Party	Candidate	Votes	%
Democratic	Jimmy Van Bramer	15,285	
Working Families	Jimmy Van Bramer	1,816	
Total	Jimmy Van Bramer (incumbent)	17,101	85.1
Republican	Marvin Jeffcoat	2,477	
Conservative	Marvin Jeffcoat	461	
Total	Marvin Jeffcoat	2,938	14.6
Write-in		69	0.3
Total votes		20,108	100
Democratic hold			

=== 2013 ===
2013 New York City Council election, District 26
Party	Candidate	Votes	%
Democratic	Jimmy Van Bramer	12,897	
Working Families	Jimmy Van Bramer	1,506	
Total	Jimmy Van Bramer (incumbent)	14,403	99.4
Write-in		94	0.6
Total votes		14,497	100
Democratic hold			
