= Ocean Hill, Brooklyn =

Neighborhood in New York City

Coordinates: 40.680°N 73.908°W

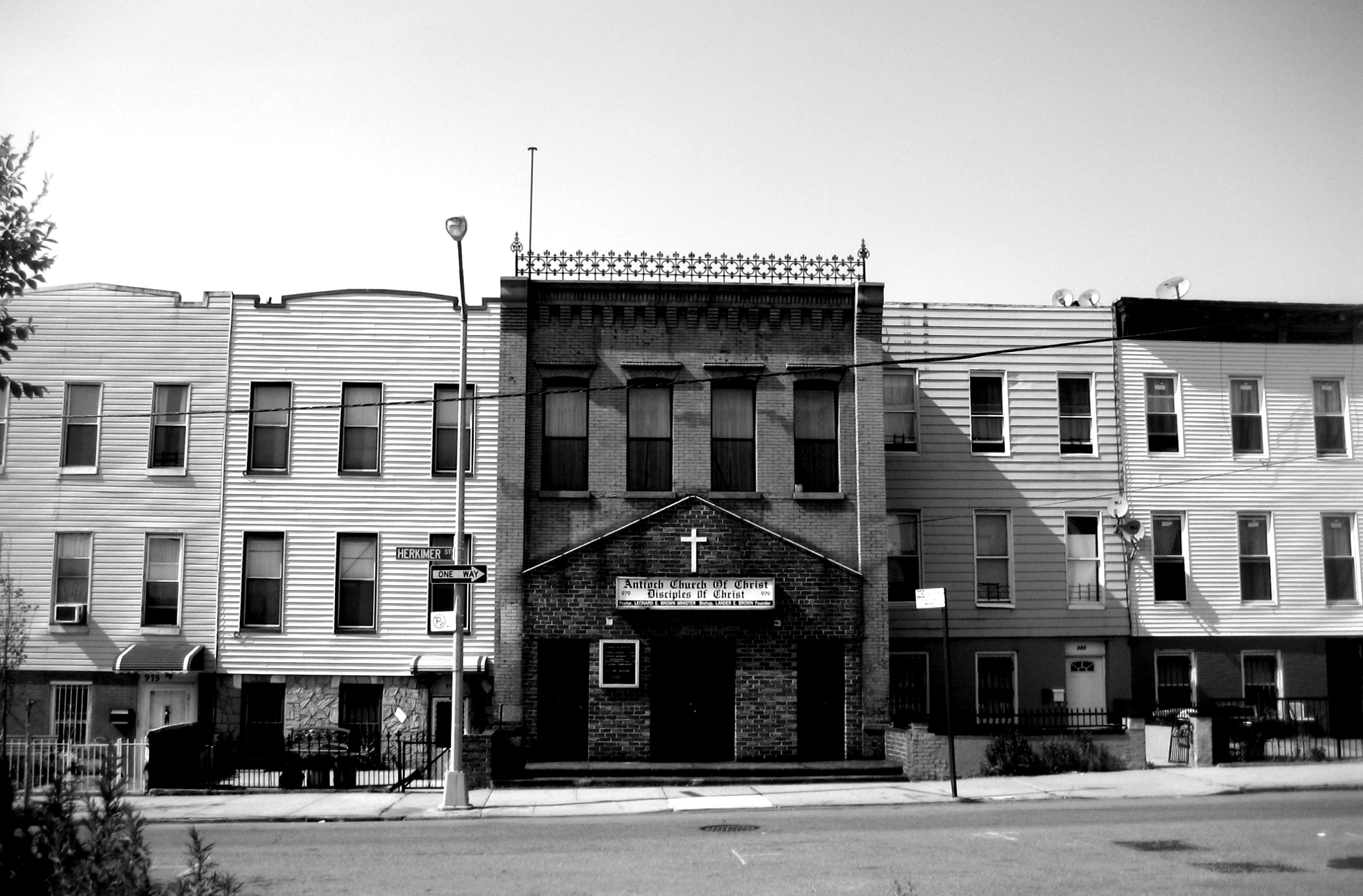
Houses in Ocean Hill

Location in New York City

Ocean Hill is a subsection of Bedford–Stuyvesant in the New York City borough of Brooklyn. The neighborhood is part of Brooklyn Community Board 16 and was founded in 1890. The ZIP code for the neighborhood is 11233. Ocean Hill's boundaries start from Broadway and the neighborhood of Bushwick in the north, Ralph Avenue and the neighborhoods of Bedford–Stuyvesant proper and Crown Heights to the west, East New York Avenue and the neighborhood of Brownsville to the south, and Van Sinderen Avenue and the neighborhood of East New York to the east.

== History ==
Ocean Hill was named because it was slightly hilly. Ocean Hill was subdivided from the larger community of Stuyvesant Heights. From the beginning of the 20th century to the 1960s Ocean Hill was an Italian enclave. By the late 1960s Ocean Hill and Bedford–Stuyvesant proper together formed the largest African American community in the United States.

In 1968, the Ocean Hill–Brownsville school district experienced a major teachers' strike. At that time, the New York City Board of Education exercised centralized control of the entire school system, assigning teachers and administrators to local schools. In response to complaints from parents in poor minority neighborhoods that schools were failing their students, the Ford Foundation helped fund an experimental program in the district that gave control to local educators and families. The program started off smoothly, but it ended as a fiery chapter in city history. Charging that Board of Education employees were seeking to sabotage the decentralization effort, black district leaders exiled 13 teachers and six administrators—most of them Jewish—to other districts. As the United Federation of Teachers protested the transfers, the two sides traded harsh accusations of racism and anti-Semitism. Teachers declared a months' long strike that shuttered most of the city's schools. The conflict finally ended when the Board of Education agreed to set up local school boards throughout the city.

The July 1977 blackout in New York City led to widespread looting and arson. A fire set in a looted warehouse spread to several nearby structures and severely damaged tenement buildings in the area. Many heavily damaged buildings were abandoned for many years like the ones in the South Bronx. Finally in the 1990s Ocean Hill experienced a revitalization as many abandoned buildings and lots were renovated.

=== Gentrification ===
Ocean Hill is in the process of gentrification. An increasing number of people of various ethnicities are moving into the area due to slightly lower rent prices in Brownsville and eastern Crown Heights. Many abandoned buildings and brownstones have been rehabilitated. Prospect Plaza Houses, once a notorious housing project unit, has been closed by the New York City Housing Authority and is in the process of being rebuilt under the federally funded HOPE VI program. There are attempts to overhaul the area to resemble Fort Greene-Clinton Hill due to the low rents and massive retail space.

Many residents of Ocean Hill consider themselves residents of Bedford-Stuyvesant. Due to gentrification, many real estate developers and the community board use the name Bedford-Stuyvesant/Ocean Hill or just Bedford-Stuyvesant, to avoid the neighborhood being confused with neighboring Brownsville to the southeast.

== Broadway Junction ==
Ocean Hill, itself a sub-neighborhood of Bedford–Stuyvesant, also contains the sub-sub-neighborhood of Broadway Junction, defined by Broadway to the north, Atlantic Avenue to the south, Rockaway Avenue to the west, and Van Sinderen Avenue to the east. The area is mostly zoned for light commercial and industrial use, but there is some residential development in the area which consists of two- to three-story residences. Broadway Junction is split roughly in half by the Atlantic Avenue/LIRR viaduct, with few connections between the two parts of the neighborhood. This disconnect, combined with small blocks and relatively underused streets, parcels, and public spaces, has led to the subsection's characterization as a blighted area, and as such, it is largely ignored by neighboring communities. There are plans to add mixed-use areas in Broadway Junction, as well as rezone the area for residential, commercial, and industrial developments, as well as improve transit connectivity in the area. A plan put forth by the New York City Department of Transportation would make Broadway Junction into a transportation hub, with residential integration with Ocean Hill on the west and mixed-use industrial and commercial properties on the east.

Broadway Junction was originally known as Jamaica Pass, a name that became famous in 1776 as the route the British Army marched from southern Kings County to attack Brooklyn during the Battle of Long Island. The current name refers to the current Broadway Junction subway station, which once connected to the LIRR and the Fulton Street El as well. Nearby is the Cemetery of the Evergreens, and Highland Park.

== Demographics ==
Based on data from the 2020 United States census, the population for the neighborhood was 37,952, an increase of 18.8% from the 31,935 counted in the 2010 census. The 2020 population for the neighborhood was 24,567 (64.7%) Black non-Hispanic, 7,714 (20.3%) Hispanic/Latino (of any race), 2,597 (6.8%) White non-Hispanic, 1,879 (5.0%) Non-Hispanic of two or more races, 741 (2.0%) Asian non-Hispanic and 454 (1.2%) some other race, non-Hispanic.

Based on data from the 2010 census, the population of Ocean Hill was 31,935, an increase of 1,868 (6.2%) from the 30,067 counted in 2000. Covering an area of 460.85 acres (186.50 ha), the neighborhood had a population density of 69.3 inhabitants per acre (44,400/sq mi; 17,100/km^{2}). The racial makeup of the neighborhood was 1.4% (439) White, 77.7% (24,825) African American, 0.4% (132) Native American, 0.6% (199) Asian, 0.0% (2) Pacific Islander, 0.3% (111) from other races, and 1.6% (511) from two or more races. Hispanic or Latino of any race were 17.9% (5,716) of the population.

== Safety ==
The 73rd Precinct of the New York City Police Department covers the area. From the 1960s to early 2000s, Ocean Hill and neighboring Brownsville experienced a high crime rate, but by 2019, the crime rates reached an all-time low.

== Transportation ==
Ocean Hill is served by the B7, B12, B15, B20, B25, B47, B60 and Q24 of the New York City Bus. The A, C, J, L, and Z trains of the New York City Subway, on the BMT Canarsie Line, BMT Jamaica Line, and IND Fulton Street Line, which all meet at Broadway Junction. There is also Long Island Rail Road (LIRR) service at nearby East New York.

== Notable residents ==
- Anton Coppola (1917–2020), opera conductor and composer
- Steve Cuozzo (born 1950), writer/editor for the New York Post
- Meade Esposito (1907–1993), politician who was a Brooklyn Democratic Party leader and political boss
- Walter R. Hart (1894–1969), judge for the Second Judicial District
- Red Holzman (1920–1998), Basketball Hall of Fame NBA 2-time All-Star & coach.
- Harry Maione (1908–1942), contract killer and gangster who served as a hitman for Murder, Inc. and was born in and led a gang in Ocean Hill.
- Samuel D. Wright (1925–1998), politician who served in the New York State Assembly and the New York City Council

== See also ==
- Bedford–Stuyvesant
- Brooklyn Community Board 16
- New York City teachers' strike of 1968
