= McCooey =

McCooey is a surname. Notable people with the surname include:

- Art McCooey (1738–1773), Irish poet
- David McCooey (born 1967), Australian poet
- Frank McCooey (1888–1962), Australian rules footballer
- John H. McCooey (1864–1934), New York politician
- Matt McCooey (born 1981), British-Japanese actor
- Richard McCooey (1930–2014), American restaurateur
