= Edward J. Riegelmann =

American judge and entrepreneur (1870–1941)

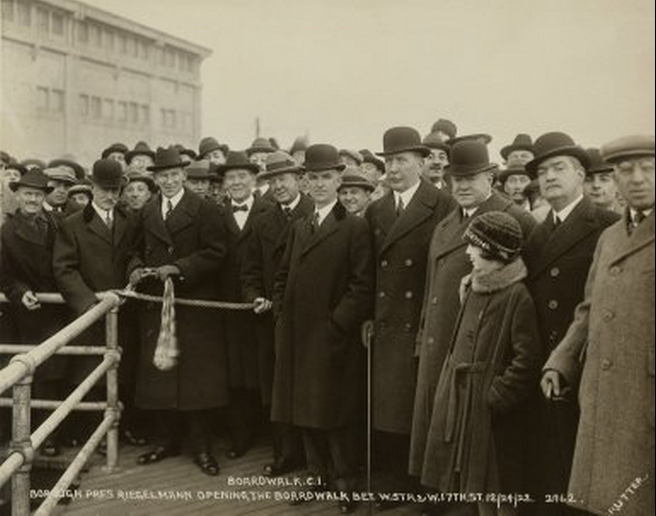
Riegelmann opening the Coney Island boardwalk in 1922. Riegelmann is the man in the center, next to the man holding the cane.

Edward J. Riegelmann (September 5, 1869 – January 15, 1941) was an American Democratic politician from Brooklyn, Kings County, New York, best remembered for the Riegelmann Boardwalk.

== Biography ==
Riegelmann was one of five children born to Frederick and Margret Riegelmann on the Lower East Side of Manhattan. The family moved to Williamsburg, Brooklyn ten years later. Riegelmann graduated from the Metropolis Law School, which later merged with New York University Law School. He was admitted to the New York State Bar in 1898. He began practicing law with the Charles O. Grim and set out to make a mark in the field of Democratic Politics.

In 1904, Riegelmann was rewarded with leadership of the Democratic State Speakers Bureau in the presidential campaign. He then served as counsel to the Sheriff of Kings County, New York, assistant corporation counsel in Brooklyn, assistant counsel to the New York Public Service Commission, and was Sheriff of Kings County from 1915 to 1917. He was a delegate to Democratic National Convention from New York in 1920. He then ran successfully for Brooklyn Borough President, serving from January 1, 1918 to December 31, 1924. During his tenure as borough president, Riegelmann won approval for construction of the Brooklyn Municipal Building at Court and Joralemon Streets, worked to beautify Coney Island and make all access to the beach free, and was largely responsible for the construction of the Coney Island boardwalk, which was eventually named for him. He was a Democratic National Committee alternate in 1924 and 1940, and was appointed Justice of New York Supreme Court 2nd District, by Franklin Roosevelt serving from January 1, 1925, until he retired on December 31, 1939.

Edward J. Riegelmann died on January 15, 1941, in Brooklyn, aged 72, and was buried at Calvary Cemetery in Queens.

== Riegelmann Boardwalk/Coney Island Beach ==
One of Riegelmann's most notable projects was the construction of the Riegelmann Boardwalk in Coney Island. As early as the 19th century, it was being developed as a seaside resort, and by the first decade of the 20th century, it had become overcrowded. As Brooklyn Borough President, Riegelmann took charge of beautifying Coney Island and ensuring public access to the beach and shore. After the city secured title to property along the beachfront, the project began in 1921. The boardwalk, which extended between West 37th Street and Ocean Parkway, opened on May 15, 1923.

Political offices
Preceded by Lewis H. Pounds	Borough president of Brooklyn; 1918–1924	Succeeded by Joseph A. Guider
