= McCovey =

McCovey is a surname. Notable people with the surname include:

- Willie McCovey (1938–2018), American baseball player

== See also ==
- McCooey
- McCovey Cove, the name for a section of San Francisco Bay
- Wendi McLendon-Covey (born 1969), American actress, writer, producer, and comedian
