= Joseph A. Guider =

American politician

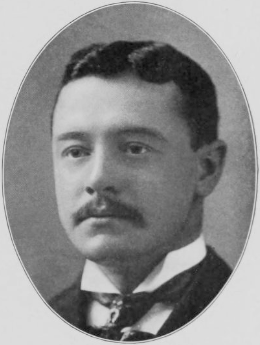

Borough President of Brooklyn
- In office 1925–1926
- Preceded by: Edward J. Riegelmann
- Succeeded by: James J. Byrne

Member of the New York State Assembly from Kings County, 11th District
- In office 1896–1900

Personal details
- Born: March 12, 1870 Brooklyn, New York, US
- Died: September 22, 1926 (aged 56) Brooklyn, New York, US
- Resting place: Holy Cross Cemetery, Brooklyn
- Party: Democratic
- Spouse: Sadie Blanche Fox (d. 1915)

Joseph A. Guider (March 12, 1870 – September 22, 1926) was an American politician from New York.

== Life ==
Guider was born on March 12, 1870, in Brooklyn. After finishing school, he worked in the New England Improvement Company. When he was 22, he moved to the building business and quickly became regarded as an expert in the field. He was a director of the Mechanics and Traders' Exchange, a director of The Sun Manufacturing Company, and vice-president of the Brucker Fire Proofing Company.

In 1895, Guider was elected to the New York State Assembly as a Democrat, representing the Kings County 11th District. He served in the Assembly in 1896, 1898, 1899, and 1900. While in the Assembly, he introduced and passed a bill that allowed bicyclists to cross the Brooklyn Bridge without charge.

When Edward J. Riegelmann was elected borough president of Brooklyn in 1918, Guider became the Commissioner of Public Works in Brooklyn. He served in that position for the next seven years. When Riegelmann resigned to join the New York Supreme Court at the end of 1924, Guider was elected by the Brooklyn aldermen to replace him as borough president. He was then elected to the office in 1925. As borough president, he sponsored a number of improvements in Brooklyn, including building the Brooklyn Municipal Building, and advocated for an independent Brooklyn university.

Guider's wife, Sadie Blanche Fox, died in 1915. They had no children. He was a member of the Ancient Order of Foresters and president of the American Foot Ball Association.

Guider died at Skene Sanitarium in Brooklyn on September 22, 1926. He went to the sanitarium to undergo an appendectomy, since his appendix ruptured and peritonitis set in. He was buried in Holy Cross Cemetery.

New York State Assembly
| Preceded by Henry Schulz | New York State Assembly; Kings County, 11th District; 1896 | Succeeded by Lucien S. Bayliss |
| Preceded by Lucien S. Bayliss | New York State Assembly; Kings County, 11th District; 1898-1900 | Succeeded by Waldo R. Blackwell |
Political offices
| Preceded by Edward J. Riegelmann | Borough President of Brooklyn; 1925-1926 | Succeeded by James J. Byrne |
