= James J. Byrne (politician) =

American politician

Borough President of Brooklyn
- In office 1926 – March 14, 1930
- Preceded by: Joseph A. Guider

Personal details
- Born: April 8, 1863 Brooklyn, New York, U.S.
- Died: March 14, 1930 (aged 66) Brooklyn, New York, U.S.
- Resting place: Holy Cross Cemetery, Brooklyn
- Party: Democratic
- Spouse: Mary A. Sesnon
- Children: 3
- Education: St. James Parochial School
- Occupation: Singer, politician

James J. Byrne (April 8, 1863 – March 14, 1930) was an American singer and politician from New York.

== Biography ==
Byrne was born on April 8, 1863, in Brooklyn, the son of Irish immigrants Richard Byrne and Bridget Lawrey. He grew up in Irishtown district and attended St. James Parochial School.

Byrne initially worked as a clerk for a shoe store in downtown Brooklyn. He later worked in John Good's machine shop on Park Avenue and became a machinist. Good later promoted him to a clerkship. When Good's machine shop was absorbed by a different company, Byrne worked for the James Reilly Repair and Supply Company. He was also working on his singing during this time; even as a young man, he won recognition for his baritone voice. He studied for several years under Luigi Meola, and in 1890 he and his childhood friend Peter J. Collins organized the Metropolitan Male Quartet. The quartet were in amateur light opera presentations, minstrel shows, and choir singers. He left the quartet in 1895, when they entered the professional field, but he continued singing in amateur affairs.

In 1898, Byrne took the civil service examination and was promptly appointed chief clerk of the Building Department. In 1907, he became chief clerk of the Bureau of Public Offices and Buildings. In 1918, he became superintendent of the department. When Joseph A. Guider became borough president of Brooklyn, Byrne succeeded him as Commissioner of Public Works. After Guider's death in 1926, the Brooklyn aldermen unanimously picked Byrne to succeed him. In the fall of that year, the Democrats nominated him to finish Guider's term. He easily won that election as well as a re-election in 1929. As borough president, he brought a number of civic improvements to the borough, including for the Coney Island Boardwalk, the Brooklyn Municipal Building, and the Central Court Building.

In 1906, Byrne married Mary A. Sesnon, the sister-in-law of John H. McCooey. Their children were Richard Sesnon (who died in 1928), Donald, and Jean. Richard and Donald were both singers and served as soloists for the Paulist Choristers. Byrne was a member of the Cathedral Club, the Elks, the St. Patrick's Society, the Emerald Society, the Holy Name Society of St. Joseph's Roman Catholic Church, the Knights of Columbus, and the American Irish Historical Society.

Byrne died in Brooklyn Hospital from an embolism and a stroke on March 14, 1930. He was buried in Holy Cross Cemetery. Thirty thousand people attended his funeral.

Political offices
Preceded by Joseph A. Guider	Borough president of Brooklyn; 1926–1930	Succeeded by Henry Hesterberg
