= Riegelmann Boardwalk =

Boardwalk in Brooklyn, New York

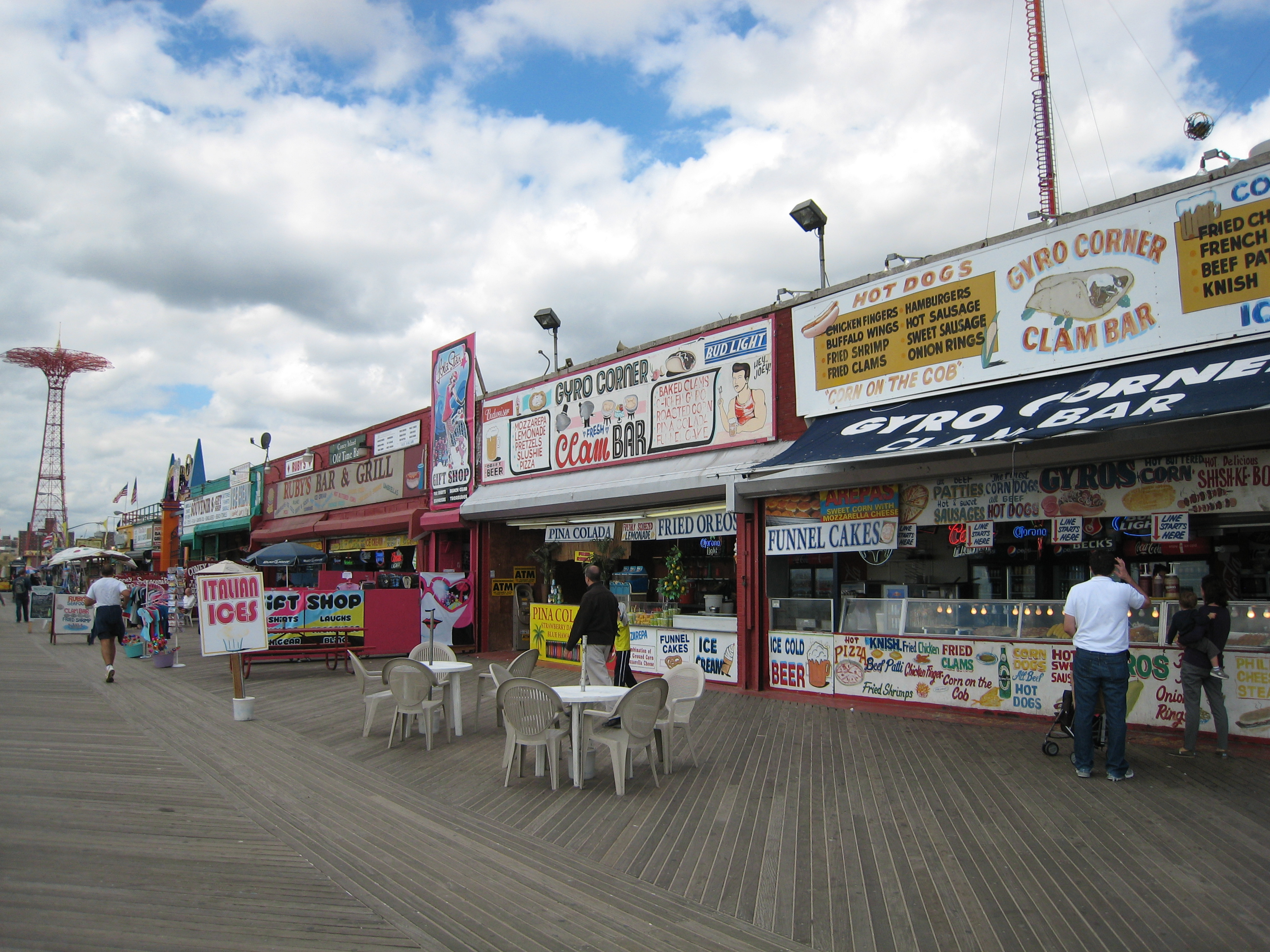
- Shops along the boardwalk, with the Parachute Jump in the background
- Interactive map of Riegelmann Boardwalk
- Location: Brooklyn, New York, U.S.
- Nearest city: New York City
- Coordinates: 40°34′24″N 73°58′44″W
- Area: 2.7 miles (4.3 km) long by 50 to 80 feet (15 to 24 m) wide
- Created: 1923
- Operator: New York City Department of Parks and Recreation
- Status: Open year-round

New York City Landmark
- Designated: May 15, 2018
- Reference no.: 2583

The Riegelmann Boardwalk (also known as the Coney Island Boardwalk) is a 2.7-mile-long (4.3 km) boardwalk on the southern shore of the Coney Island peninsula of Brooklyn in New York City, New York, United States. Opened in 1923, the boardwalk runs along the Atlantic Ocean between West 37th Street to the west, at the edge of the Sea Gate neighborhood, and Brighton 15th Street to the east, in Brighton Beach. It is operated by the New York City Department of Parks and Recreation (NYC Parks).

The Riegelmann Boardwalk is primarily made of wooden planks arranged in a chevron pattern. It ranges from 50 to 80 feet (15 to 24 m) wide and is raised slightly above sea level. The boardwalk connects several amusement areas and attractions on Coney Island, including the New York Aquarium, Luna Park, Deno's Wonder Wheel Amusement Park, and Maimonides Park. It has become an icon of Coney Island, with numerous appearances in the visual arts, music, and film. After its completion, the boardwalk was considered the most important public works project in Brooklyn since the Brooklyn Bridge, with a comparable impact to the Catskill Watershed and Central Park.

By the mid-19th century, the Coney Island waterfront was divided among several private entities who erected barriers. Plans for a Coney Island boardwalk were first discussed in the late 1890s as a means of uniting the different sections of Coney Island, and as a revitalization project for these areas. The boardwalk, designed by Philip P. Farley, was named after Brooklyn borough president Edward J. Riegelmann, who led its construction. The Riegelmann Boardwalk's first portion opened in 1923, with further extensions in 1926 and 1941, as well as several modifications and repairs throughout the 20th century. After NYC Parks proposed repairing the boardwalk with concrete in the early 21st century, the New York City Landmarks Preservation Commission designated the Riegelmann Boardwalk a scenic landmark in 2018. A renovation of the boardwalk was announced in November 2021 but was delayed.

== Description ==
=== Dimensions and materials ===
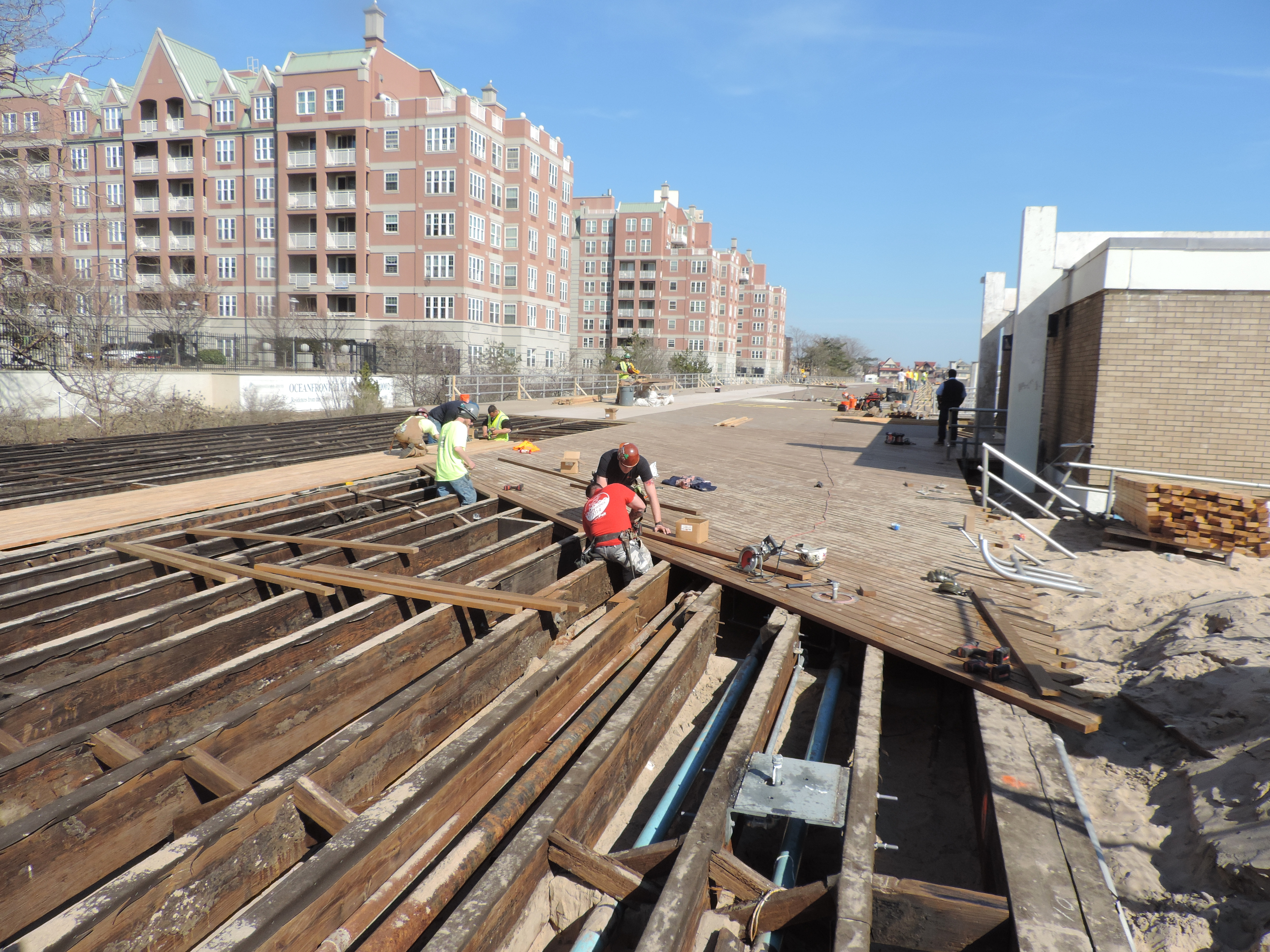
Internal structure of the boardwalk, seen in a 2016 rebuild

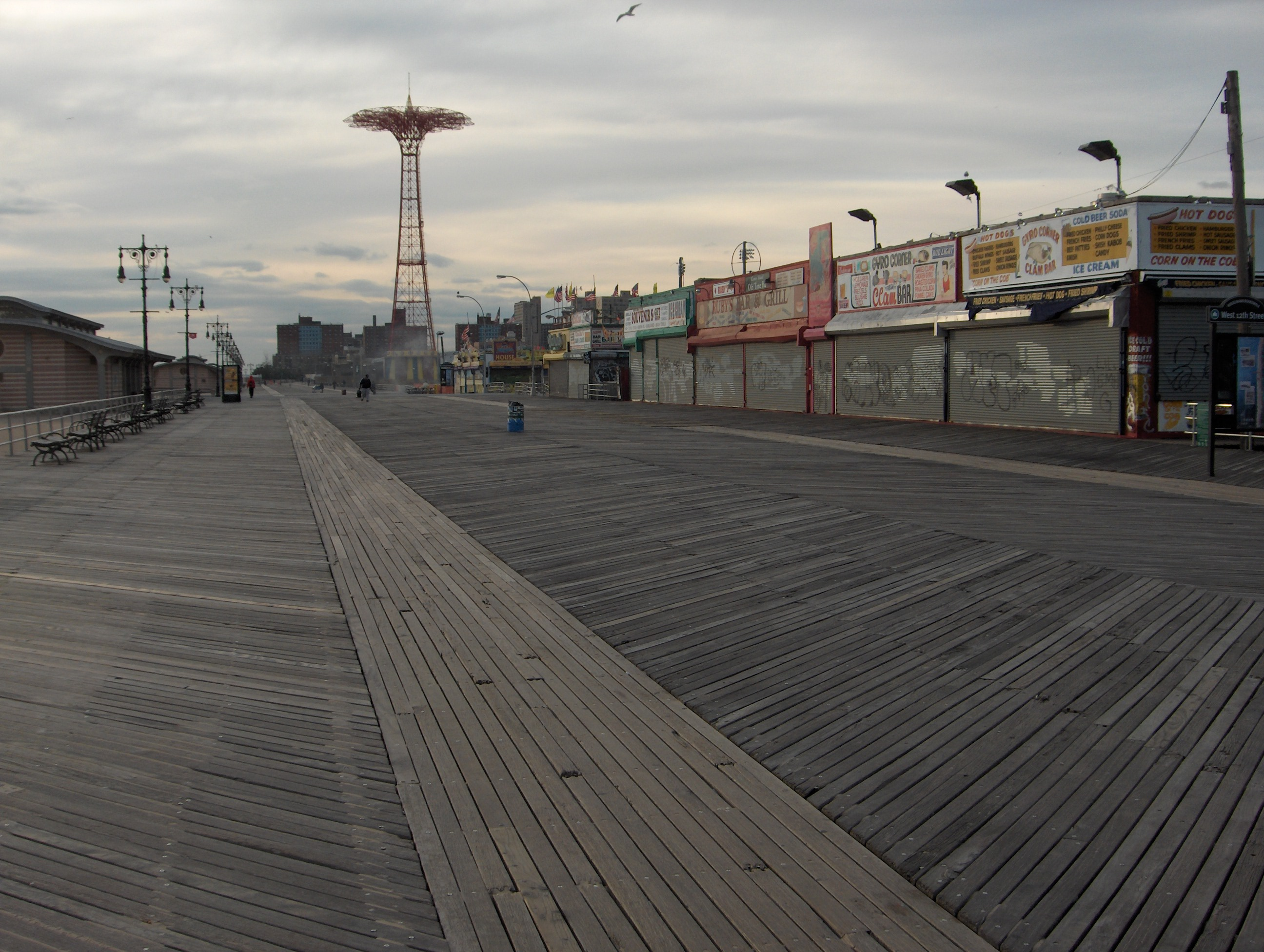
The modified-chevron pattern of the planks

The Riegelmann Boardwalk stretches for 2.7 miles (4.3 km) from West 37th Street at the border of Coney Island and Sea Gate to Brighton 15th Street in Brighton Beach. The boardwalk is 80 feet (24 m) wide for most of its length, though portions in Brighton Beach are 50 feet (15 m) wide. It is raised 13 or 14 feet (4.0 or 4.3 m) above sea level to protect against storm surges. According to a speech given in 1923 to the Rotary Club of Brooklyn, the raised boardwalk was designed to "give ample clear space under the boardwalk" both parallel and perpendicular to the deck. Staircases and ramps lead southward to the beach at intervals of 1 1/2 blocks or 300 feet (91 m). Ramps also connect the boardwalk to the streets to the north.

The boardwalk has a steel and concrete foundation supporting wood planking for the walkway, though much of this is no longer visible due to the beach having been raised after the boardwalk was constructed. The boardwalk was built using 1,700,000 cubic yards (1,300,000 m^{3}) of sand, 120,000 short tons (110,000 long tons) of stone, 7,700 cubic yards (5,900 m^{3}) of reinforced concrete, and 3,600,000 feet (1,100,000 m) of timber flooring. To prevent violent waves from crashing against the boardwalk, sixteen rock jetties were built at intervals of 600 feet (183 m). The beaches are not a natural feature; the sand that would naturally replenish Coney Island is cut off by the jetty at Breezy Point, Queens. Following the boardwalk's construction, sand has been redeposited on the beaches via beach nourishment.

The boardwalk is designed to handle a maximum load of 125 pounds per square foot (610 kg/m^{2}). To accomplish this, designer Philip Farley installed a precast concrete-girder structure under the boardwalk on the advice of J.W. Hackney, who designed Atlantic City's boardwalk. Pile bents were placed every 20 feet (6 m), with each bent containing two bundles of four reinforced concrete piles. The piles rest on bases that measure 14 inches (36 cm) square and extend downward 20 feet (6 m). The ends of the girder structures are cantilevered outside the piles.

The boardwalk's planks are set in a modified chevron design, running at 45-degree angles between two longitudinal wooden axes. The diagonal pattern was intended to "facilitate ease in walking", according to American Lumberman magazine, while the 6-foot-wide (1.8 m) wooden axes were designed for chairs to be rolled down the boardwalk. The boardwalk was first built using Douglas fir planks from Washington state. By the early 2010s, sturdy hardwoods were added to the boardwalk, as were plastic and concrete. The boardwalk is used as a bike lane between 6 a.m. and 9 p.m. each day, except during summers, when cycling is curtailed after 10 a.m. The boardwalk must be manually shoveled during snowstorms, as road salt and snowplows both damage the wood.

=== Amenities ===
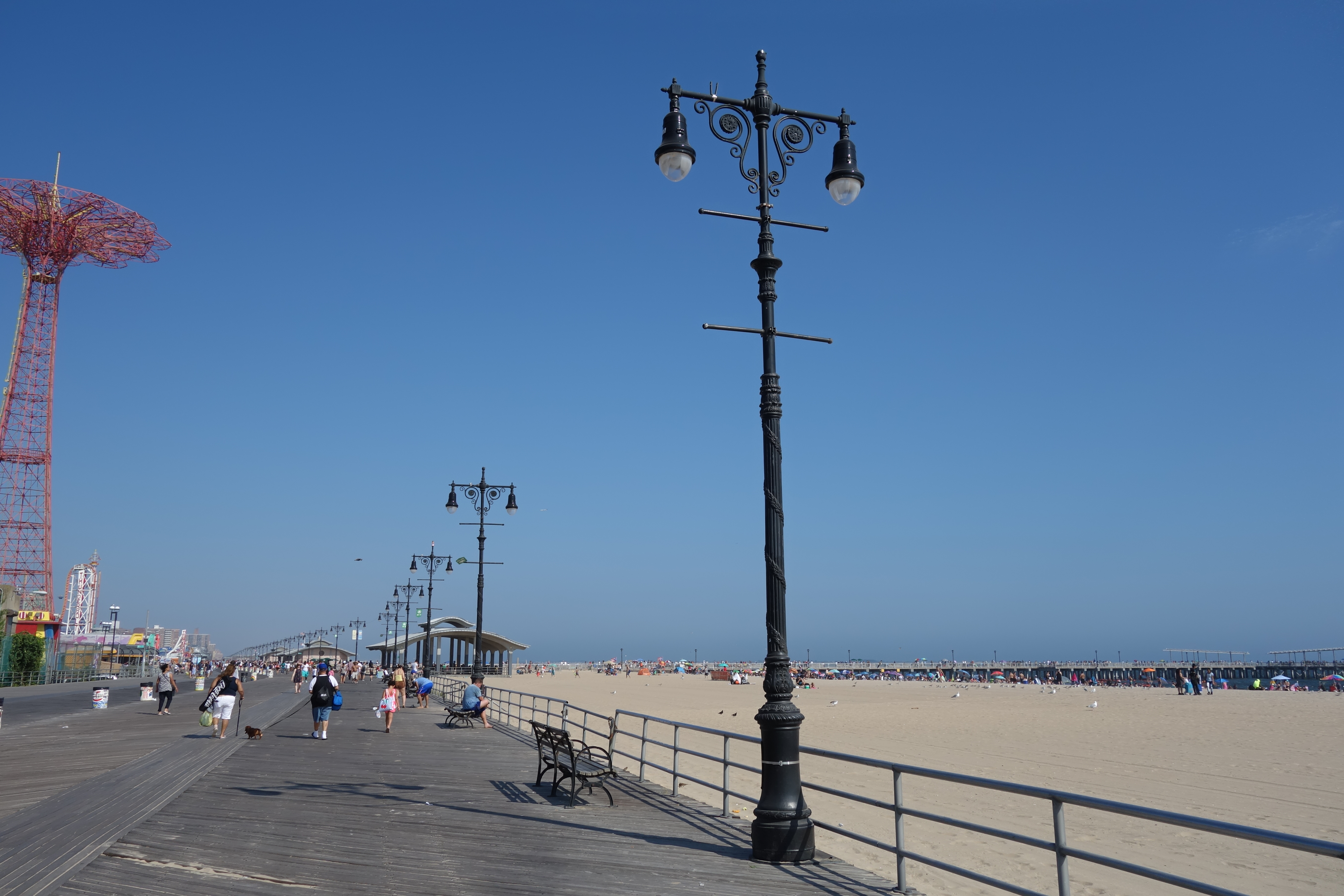
Original twin-lamp street lights

There are restrooms, benches, and drinking fountains along the boardwalk's length, both atop the deck and beneath it. Five pavilions and five pergolas were completed in 1925 by J. Sarsfield Kennedy. (Note: The pavilions were constructed at West 8th, West 15th, West 21st, West 27th, and West 33rd Streets. The pergolas were constructed between the following streets: West 12th Street/Jones Walk, West 23rd/24th Streets, West 29th/30th Streets, and West 35th/36th Streets.) These no longer exist but were designed in the Mediterranean Revival style and contained arched doorways, along with tiled roofs supported by corner piers and Tuscan columns.

There were also "comfort stations", or restrooms, beneath the boardwalk, characterized by ornamental semicircular stairs and rooftop terraces at the same height as the deck. Most of the shade pavilions south of the boardwalk were built in the 2000s and 2010s and are elevated to comply with Federal Emergency Management Agency (FEMA) storm-surge regulations, though there are also some historic pavilions from the 20th century. The newer pavilions, designed by Garrison Architects, are modular structures that are installed in pairs. The modular structures contain double-layered stainless-steel facades and are powered by photovoltaic cells. There are four non-functional historic cast iron fountains as well as newer, functioning steel fountains.

The boardwalk's original street furnishings included 170 street lights with twin lamps, similar to those installed on Fifth Avenue in Manhattan. These street lights are placed every 80 feet (24 m), as well as at street intersections. Benches that faced the ocean were installed by the J.W. Fiske Ironworks Company, but have since been replaced.

=== Attractions ===
Modern attractions on the boardwalk include Luna Park, Deno's Wonder Wheel Amusement Park, and the New York Aquarium. The boardwalk is adjacent to Maimonides Park, which opened in 2001 and is the home stadium of the Brooklyn Cyclones, a Minor League Baseball team. A live performance venue, the Ford Amphitheater at Coney Island, opened on the boardwalk in 2016. Several amusement parks that formerly faced the boardwalk, including Steeplechase Park (1897–1964), the original Luna Park (1903–1944), and Astroland (1962–2008), no longer exist.

There are several officially designated landmarks on the boardwalk. The Childs Restaurants building, a New York City designated landmark that is now the site of the Ford Amphitheater, opened in 1923 at West 21st Street; its terracotta facade was designed to blend in with the boardwalk's appearance. To the east is the Parachute Jump, a defunct parachute tower ride standing 250 feet (76 m) tall, which is both a city landmark and a National Registered Historic Place. The B&B Carousell, directly beside the Parachute Jump, is the last operating carousel in Coney Island and is also listed on the National Register of Historic Places. The Coney Island Cyclone, a wooden roller coaster built in 1927 at West 10th Street, is the only operating coaster on Coney Island from the 20th century, and is both a city and national landmark. Set inland from the boardwalk is the Wonder Wheel (built 1920), an eccentric Ferris wheel which is 150 feet (46 m) tall and recognized as a city landmark. Other attractions on the boardwalk include the Thunderbolt roller coaster and the Abe Stark Recreation Center, as well as small amusement rides, shops, and restaurants.

The First Symphony of the Sea, a wall relief created by Japanese artist Toshio Sasaki, was installed along the boardwalk, outside the New York Aquarium, in 1993. It is 332 feet (101 m) long and 10 feet (3.0 m) tall. The relief contains depictions of waves, fish, and zygotes of marine species in terrazzo and ceramic.

==== Steeplechase Pier ====
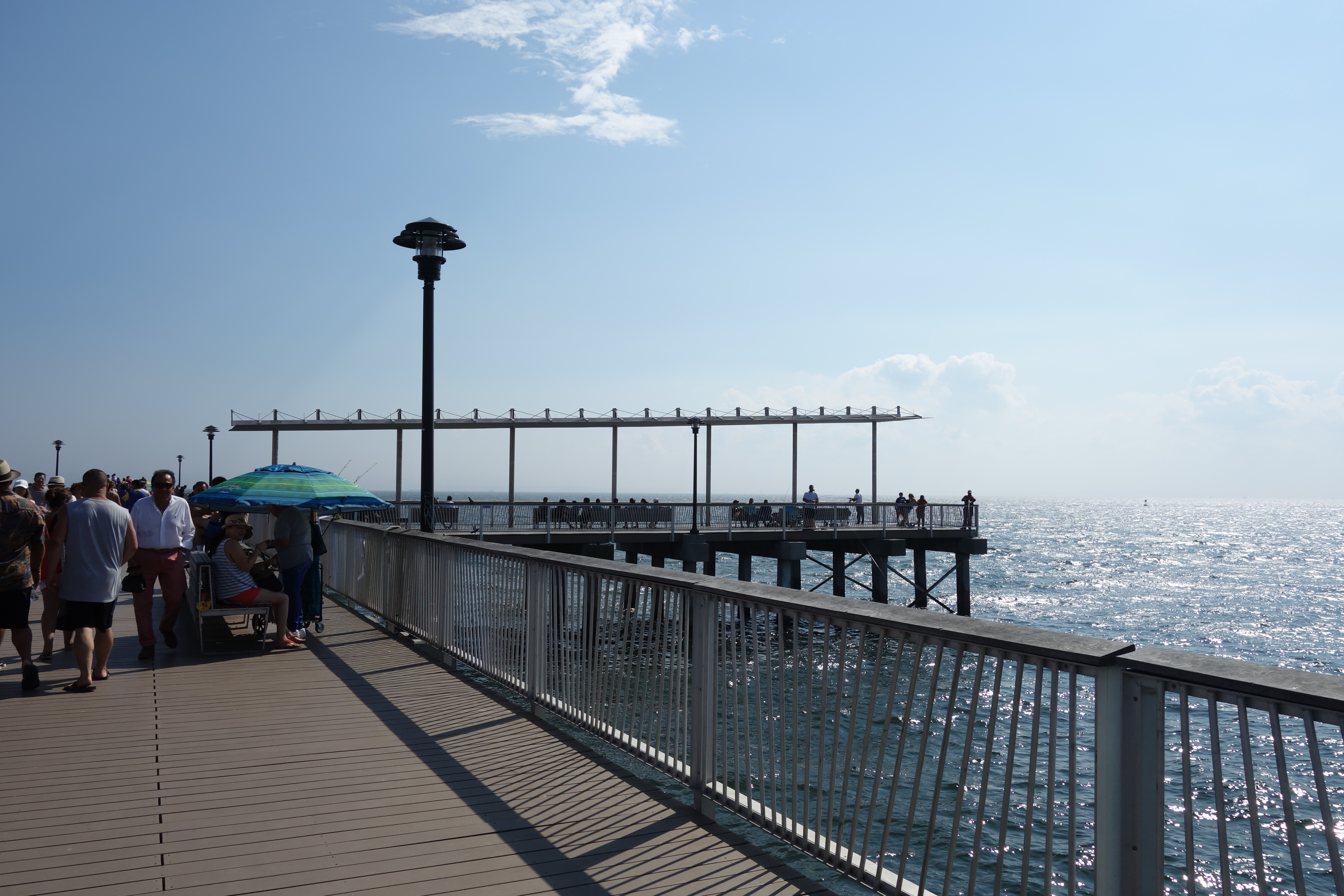
View toward the end of the pier

Steeplechase Pier, the only one remaining on Coney Island's beach, extends 1,040 feet (317 m) southward from the boardwalk's intersection with West 17th Street. It is near Steeplechase Park, of which the pier was originally part. The pier had been built by 1904, at which point it was estimated as being 2,000 feet (610 m) long. A newspaper article from that year praised the view from the pier: "There is no more beautiful view around New York than the sight of the twinkling colored lights of Coney Island and its reflection in the water." Steeplechase Pier was originally used by anglers and, until 1932, was used by ferry lines to Coney Island.

The original Steeplechase Pier was erected by builder F. J. Kelly at an unknown date and was completed within 30 days. The pier was ceded to the city in October 1921 just before the boardwalk was constructed, and was reopened in December 1922. Several proposed improvements, such as a widened deck and an auditorium, were never built. In the following years, Steeplechase Pier was damaged multiple times by hurricanes, fires, and boat accidents. The most serious incident was a fire in 1957 that destroyed the pier; a larger replacement opened the next year, with a T-shaped extension at the end. The pier was rebuilt most recently in 2013 after it was damaged by Hurricane Sandy in 2012. Two years after it reopened, the pier received a $3.4 million grant for a total reconstruction.

== History ==
=== Context ===
The Coney Island House, established in the early 19th century, was the first seaside resort on Coney Island. Coney Island could be reached easily from Manhattan, while appearing to be relatively far away. As a result, Coney Island began attracting vacationers in the 1830s and 1840s, and numerous resorts were built. New railroad lines, built after the American Civil War, served Coney Island's restaurants, hotels, bathing pavilions, theaters, the waterfront, and other attractions. A series of fires destroyed the resorts in the 1880s and 1890s. This opened up large tracts of land for the development of theme parks; the first of these was Sea Lion Park, which opened in 1895 and closed eight years later. By the first decade of the 20th century, Coney Island contained three competing amusement parks (Luna Park, Dreamland, and Steeplechase Park), and many independent amusements.

The beach remained largely inaccessible to the public, since it was the private property of beachfront lots. In 1882, the first lots were acquired from the village of Gravesend at unusually low prices and subdivided to private interests. Some portions of the beach contained private boardwalks, but other portions had no infrastructure, and some sections of the beach were enclosed by fences that extended into the water. In the 1890s, a private boardwalk was built to connect the hotels and bungalows in Brighton Beach and Manhattan Beach; this walk extended for nearly 1 mile (1.6 km). George C. Tilyou, who operated various amusements in Coney Island and later consolidated them into his Steeplechase Park, built boardwalks in his resorts at Coney Island and Rockaway Beach. Numerous privately owned piers jutted into the water at West 5th, West 8th, and West 17th Streets. Public beach accessibility was considered almost nonexistent; in 1904, it was estimated that there were 1.4 square inches (9.0 cm^{2}) of public beachfront on Coney Island for each of the 3.7 million residents of New York City. In 1912, the West End Improvement League of Coney Island noted that only one street, West 23rd Street, had direct public access to the beach from Surf Avenue, the southernmost west–east artery on what was then an island.

=== Planning and construction ===
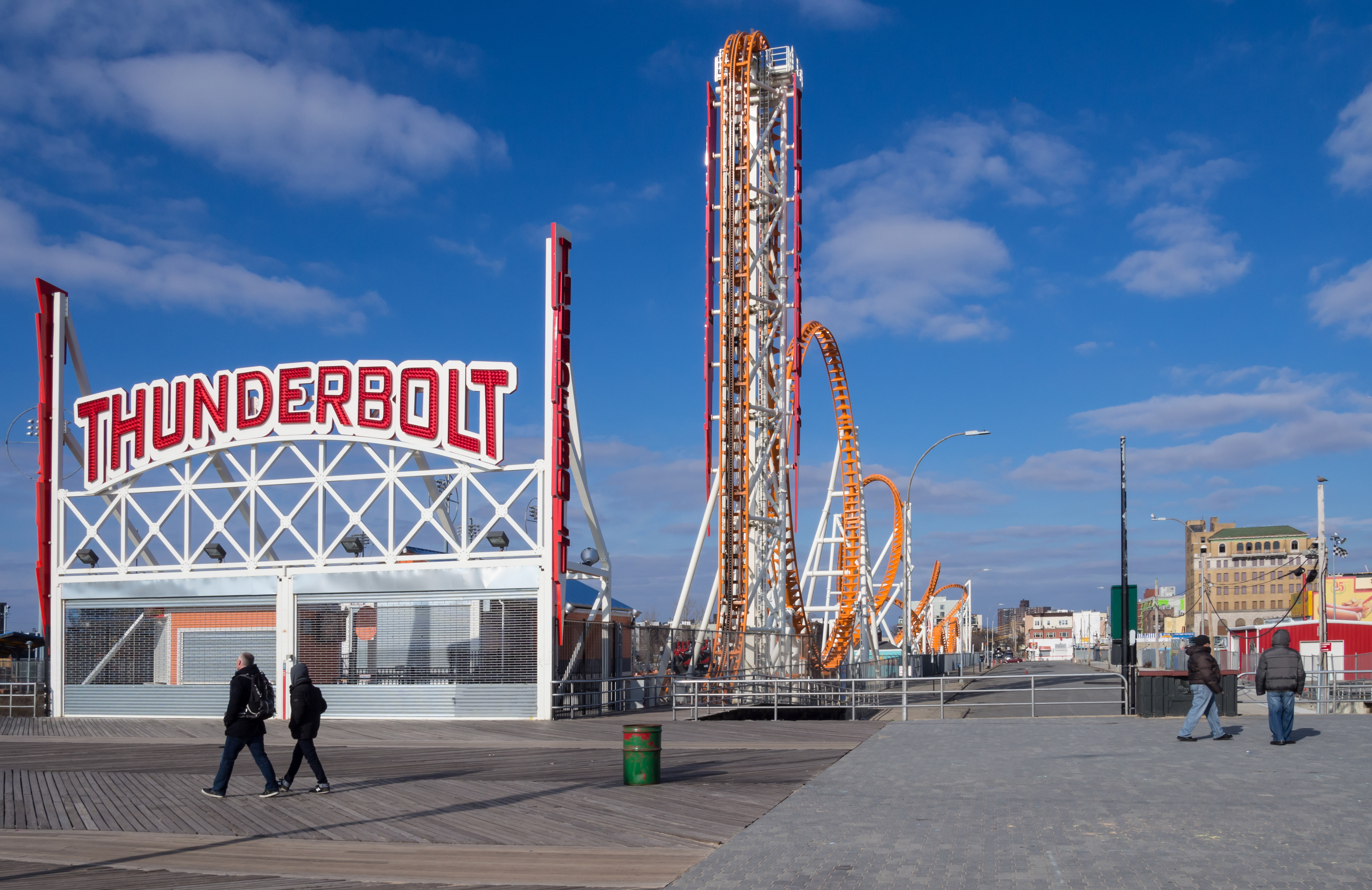
The Thunderbolt at West 15th Street

Interest in creating a public boardwalk increased in the 1890s, when the formerly separate boroughs of New York City were consolidated. The economist Simon Patten, a boardwalk proponent, said that the construction of a similar boardwalk in Atlantic City, New Jersey, in the late 19th century had helped to revitalize the formerly rundown waterfront there. The New York Association for Improving the Condition of the Poor took a similar position. In 1897, the Board of Public Improvements and Brooklyn borough president Edward M. Grout proposed a boardwalk along the southern shore of Coney Island, between West 37th and West 5th Streets. The board and Grout expected that property owners would relinquish their waterfront plots to create a 100-foot-wide (30 m) space for a boardwalk. A bill proposed in the New York State Legislature in 1901 would have required property owners to pay half of the boardwalk's $350,000 construction cost. However, the bill was heavily opposed by organizations who cited the bill's language and the projected property losses as reasons for their disapproval. Ultimately, only one segment was constructed near the Seaside Park resort, between West 5th Street and Ocean Parkway.

Other organizations in the 1900s presented numerous proposals to build a boardwalk, though these mainly entailed building a walkway over the ocean, rather than constructing a beach or clearing the waterfront. In 1912, the West End Improvement League published a 36-page booklet about the benefits of constructing a 60-foot-wide (18 m) boardwalk. This plan was endorsed by the New York City Board of Estimate, which in April 1913 approved a special committee's report on the feasibility of building such a structure. This time, Coney Island residents largely supported the proposed boardwalk, though there were disputes over whether to pay the $5 million cost through private capital or city funds. Simultaneously, in 1912, New York State sued amusement owners for taking private ownership of Coney Island's beach. A judge ruled the next year that all of the beachfront exposed at low tide belonged to the state. An appellate court affirmed this decision in 1916, with an exception made for part of Steeplechase Park, a plot of land granted by the state prior to the creation of the park. All obstructions on the beachfront were demolished in accordance with the ruling.

The Coney Island–Stillwell Avenue station, completed in 1920, allowed greater access from the rest of New York City. Overcrowding became common, with up to one million people filling the island on the hottest days. In May 1921, the state legislature voted to give the city the right to acquire any uplands facing the Atlantic Ocean on Coney Island, as well as on Queens' Rockaway Peninsula west of Beach 25th Street in Far Rockaway, Queens. In preparation for this action, the city held meetings on the initial boardwalk design in 1919. The city approved Brooklyn borough president Edward J. Riegelmann's proposal for an 80-foot-wide (24 m), 9,000-foot-long (2,700 m) boardwalk between Ocean Parkway and Sea Gate in July 1920. City officials held a groundbreaking ceremony on October 1, 1921, the day they obtained title to the land.

The actual beach improvement and boardwalk construction began in 1922. Construction was overseen by Philip P. Farley, consulting engineer for Brooklyn from 1918 to 1951. The first bents for the boardwalk structure were erected in March 1923, and the last bents were completed ten months later. Initially there was some opposition to the boardwalk's construction, and business owners unsuccessfully attempted to erect fences to prevent construction progress. Concurrently with the boardwalk improvements, Riegelmann petitioned the city to make improvements to the beach and surrounding streets to make the boardwalk easier to access. In accordance with this, sand from the seabed was used to replenish the eroded shorelines. Timber bulkheads, timber groynes, and granite jetties were installed starting in August 1922. The beach could accommodate more than a half-million people when the project was finished.

=== Opening and early operation ===
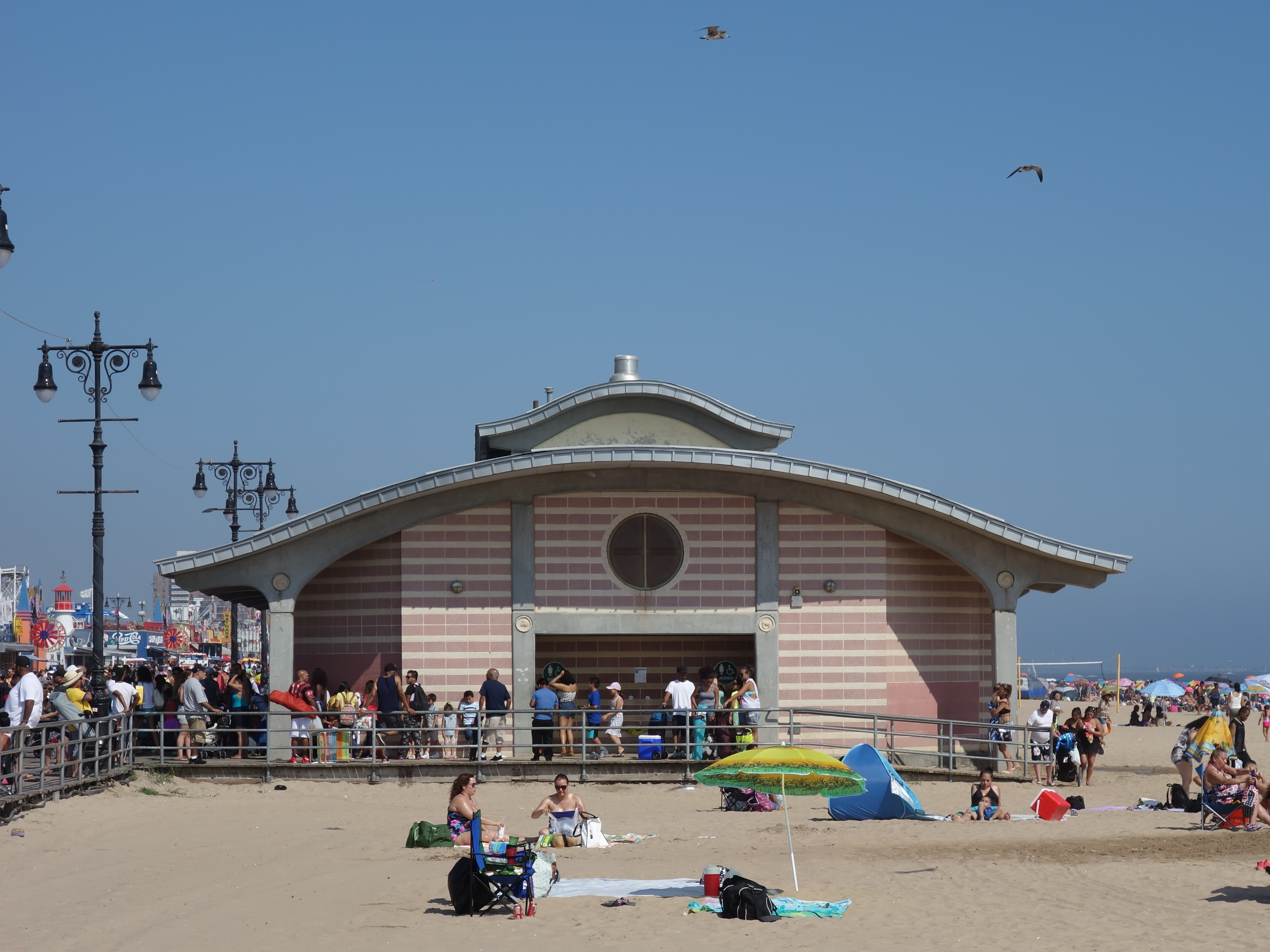
A comfort station along the boardwalk

In April 1923, shortly before the boardwalk was completed, city officials named it after Riegelmann. As one of the project's main leaders, he had boasted that the boardwalk would raise real estate values on Coney Island. Despite his role in the boardwalk's development, Riegelmann and his assistant commissioner of public works opposed the name, preferring that the project be known as the "Coney Island Boardwalk". Riegelmann stated that, when the boardwalk was completed, "poor people will no longer have to stand with their faces pressed against wire fences looking at the ocean".

The boardwalk was opened in three phases between Ocean Parkway and West 37th Street. The first section of the boardwalk, comprising the eastern section between Ocean Parkway and West 5th Street, opened in October 1922. The boardwalk was extended westward to West 17th Street in December 1922. The final section of the boardwalk, from West 17th to West 37th Street, was officially opened with a ceremony on May 15, 1923. At the time of its opening, the boardwalk was said to be wider and more expensive than the comparable boardwalks at Atlantic City, the Rockaways, and Long Beach on Long Island.

After the boardwalk was completed, Charles L. Craig, the New York City Comptroller, said that it could not be considered a "real boardwalk" without pergolas and restrooms. Accordingly, in June 1924, the New York City Board of Estimate approved the erection of five comfort stations and five beachfront pavilions. The pavilions were completed by early 1925. The Board of Estimate, in December 1922, approved another project to widen, create, or open private streets that led to the boardwalk. The work, which began in 1923, entailed condemning 288 lots, including 175 houses and portions of Steeplechase Park. Eighteen streets, each 60 feet (18 m) wide, were created between West 8th and West 35th Streets. Surf and Stillwell Avenues were widened, and the city took over several private passageways, including West 12th Street. Sewers and sidewalks were installed. Brooklyn public officials believed these changes would revitalize Coney Island's shore and lessen congestion on Surf Avenue. In total, the boardwalk and related improvement projects cost $20 million (about $376 million in 2025). Of this cost, 35 percent was paid through taxes, and the remainder was paid by the city.

The Brighton Beach extension of the boardwalk, which would build out the boardwalk from Ocean Parkway eastward to Coney Island Avenue, was formally approved by the city's Board of Estimate in June 1925. The extension was 3,000 to 4,000 feet (910 to 1,220 m) long, and entailed expanding the beach and creating new paths to the boardwalk. Real estate developments were proposed as a result of the extension, which was completed by mid-1926. The $1 million extension was to be funded via taxes levied on Coney Island property owners. Although some property owners objected to the assessments, they were ultimately forced to pay for the project.

A similar scheme to extend the boardwalk 3,000 feet (910 m) westward, from West 37th Street to Coney Island Light, was opposed by the residents of Sea Gate, the private community through which the boardwalk would have been expanded. In June 1927, borough president James J. Byrne approved the Sea Gate extension and bought land on the Sea Gate waterfront. The following year, the bulkhead lines in Sea Gate were approved for demolition, in anticipation of the boardwalk being extended. The boardwalk extension was slated to connect to a steamship pier operated by the Coney Island Steamship Corporation. However, the company was permanently enjoined from selling stocks and bonds in July 1930. The corporation claimed that the Brooklyn government had allocated $3 million to extend the boardwalk in December 1929, but borough president Henry Hesterberg denied having done so. The boardwalk was ultimately not extended past the fence on West 37th Street. After a four-block section of the boardwalk was damaged in a July 1932 fire, it was rebuilt and reopened within a month.

=== Moses reconstruction ===
In 1938, New York City Department of Parks and Recreation (NYC Parks) took over responsibility for the boardwalk's maintenance. Parks commissioner Robert Moses criticized the condition of the Coney Island, Rockaway, and South Beach boardwalks, saying, "These beaches and boardwalks were never properly planned, and cannot under present conditions be properly maintained and operated." In a letter to mayor Fiorello La Guardia, Moses wrote:

The boardwalk was constructed too near the water without providing any play areas on the north side. [...] When sand was pumped in to increase the width of the beach, instead of obtaining good white material, the contractor was allowed to deposit brown sand on the beach. Streets were cut through which dead-ended at the boardwalk, and which are no good as traffic arteries and are not proper parking spaces. The zoning ordinance was adapted to the wishes of the property owners rather than to the requirements of the public welfare.

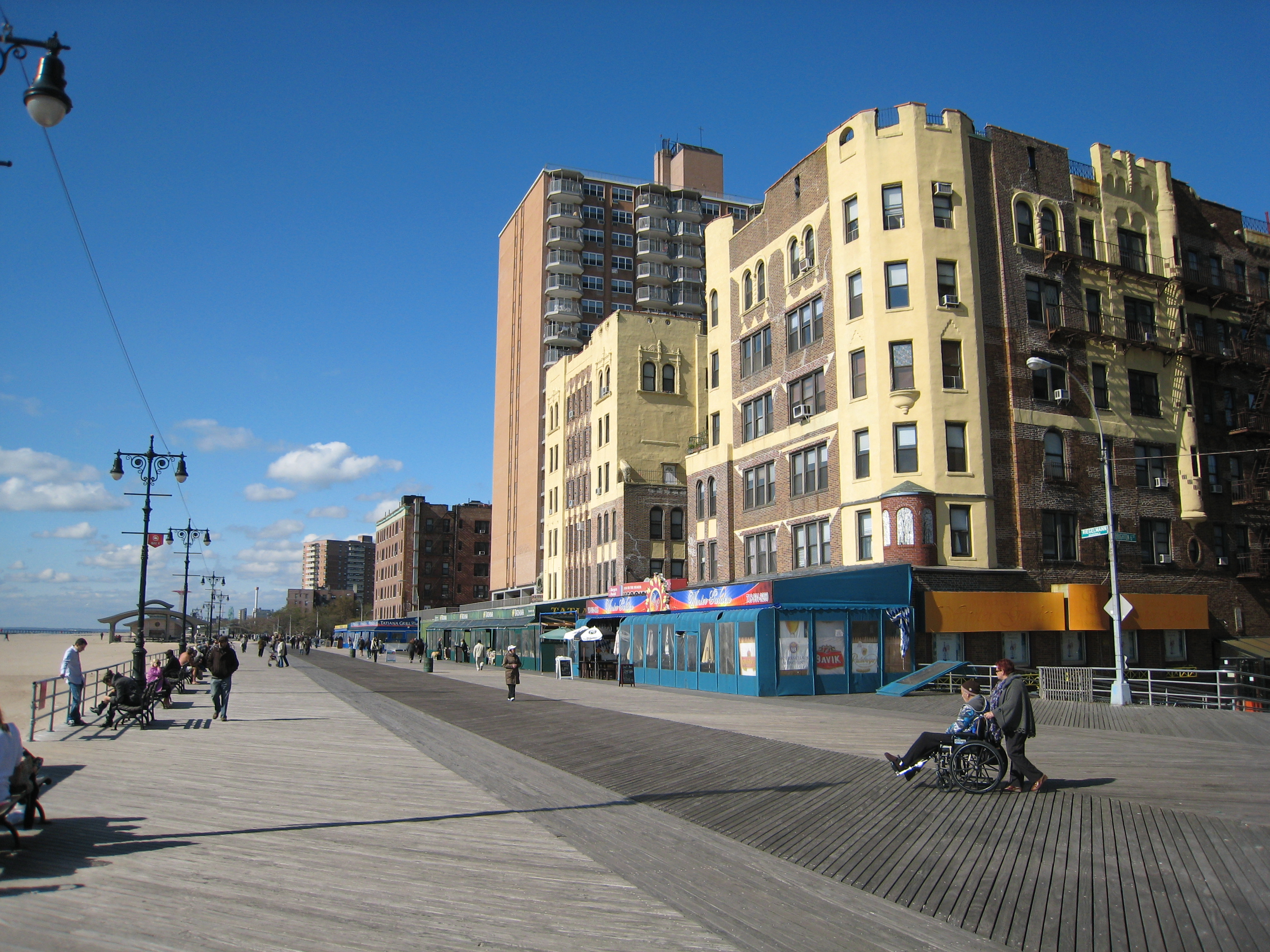
Brighton Beach extension, looking westward

Moses unsuccessfully tried to prohibit carnival barkers from the boardwalk. He also announced plans to expand it eastward, to the vicinity of Corbin Place in Brighton Beach, as well as to incorporate another 18 acres (7.3 ha) within Brighton Beach. The expansion would add capacity for 50,000 visitors along the Coney Island Beach. The project involved rebuilding an 800-foot-long (240 m) stretch of the boardwalk, relocating it 300 feet (91 m) inland and straightening its route; this required the condemnation of 20 buildings and the demolition of the Municipal Baths at West 5th Street. City officials announced plans in August 1938 to acquire 18 acres (7.3 ha) along the Brighton Beach shoreline. That October, the city acquired 18 acres (7.3 ha) from developer Joseph P. Day for the eastward extension. The expanded beach in Brighton Beach opened to the public in July 1939, and officials began allowing bicyclists to use the boardwalk that year.

Moses had originally planned to clear another 100 feet (30 m) inland of the boardwalk, but these plans were modified in August 1939 to preserve the amusement area there. The Board of Estimate approved the modified plan for the boardwalk in December; the approval had been delayed by one week after a landowner objected. The following month, the board provided an $850,000 appropriation for the work, and construction started on the boardwalk extension. To provide easier access to the boardwalk, a new street near West 9th Street was built. As part of the renovations, a two-foot (0.61 m) covering of sand, from the Rockaways and New Jersey, was placed along the entire beachfront. Some portions of the original boardwalk were preserved and moved using cranes. In addition, workers relocated lighting and emergency phone boxes; realigned Surf Avenue; and erected a lifeguard station with restrooms. The relocated boardwalk was completed by May 1940. The same year, gray paving blocks were added at Brighton 2nd, West 2nd, West 15th, West 21st, West 27th, and West 33rd Streets, as well as at Stillwell Avenue, creating firebreaks in the boardwalk.

In early 1941, workers started extending the boardwalk 1,500 feet (460 m) from Coney Island Avenue to Brighton 15th Street. The extension, 50 feet (15 m) wide, was narrower than the rest of the boardwalk. Upon completion of the extension, the boardwalk reached its current length of 2.7 miles (4.3 km). In 1955, Moses proposed extending the boardwalk east to the Manhattan Beach Boardwalk. These plans were opposed by Manhattan Beach property owners, who contended that it would bring social degradation to their community. The Board of Estimate ultimately voted against Moses's plan.

=== Late 20th century ===
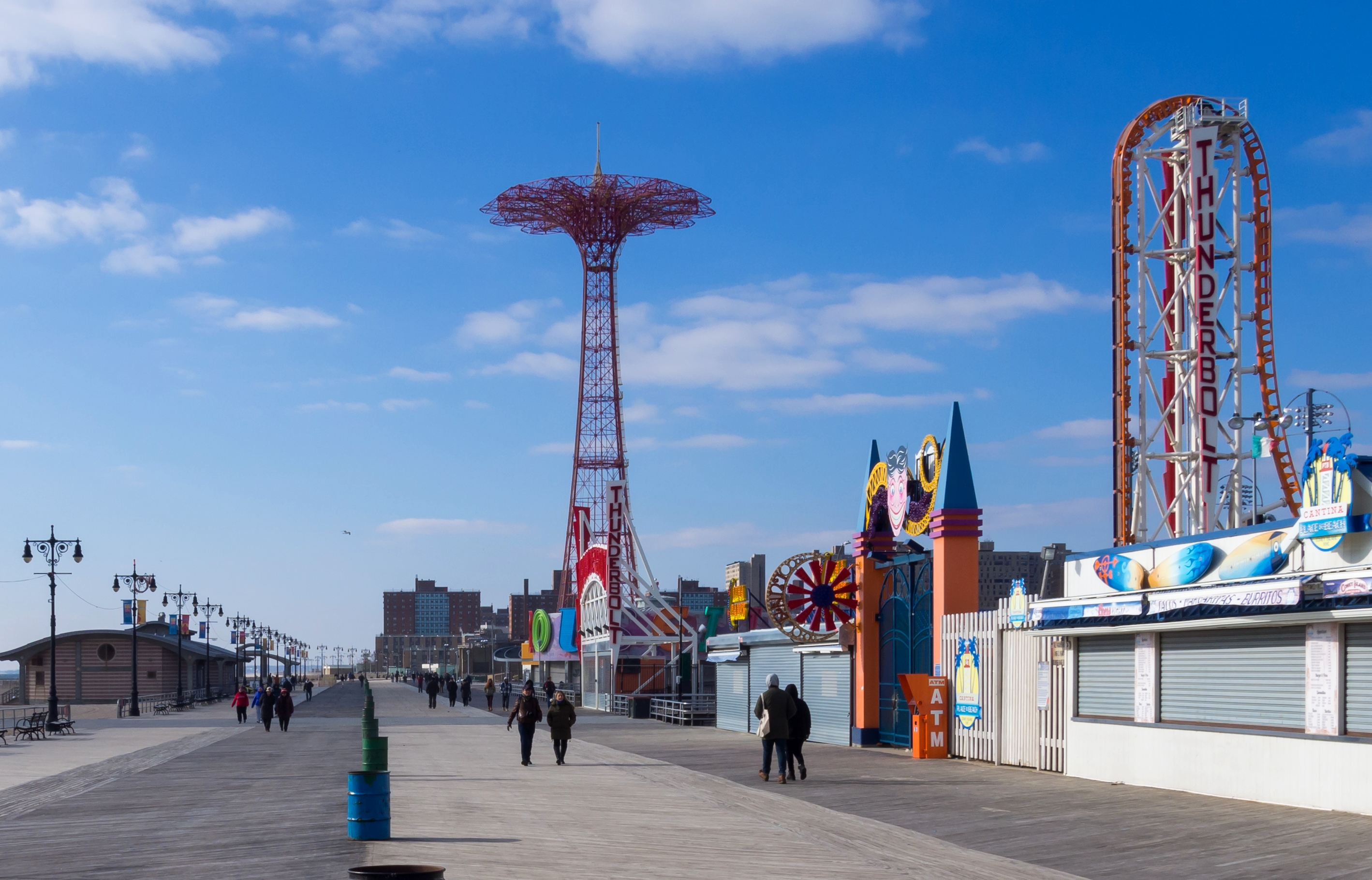
View on the boardwalk, looking west at Luna Park

Further work was undertaken on the boardwalk in the late 20th century. This included the replacement of the original street lights with replicas in the 1960s, and the replacement of benches, drinking fountains, pavilions, and comfort stations. Concrete and brick lifeguard towers were erected in the 1970s.

By the 1960s, Coney Island was in decline because of increased crime, insufficient parking facilities, bad weather, and the post-World War II automotive boom. This culminated in the closure and sale of Steeplechase Park, the area's last major amusement park, in 1965. A newspaper article noted in 1961 that between 5,000 and 10,000 people slept on the beach every night, and that the boardwalk was a common place for purse snatchings and muggings. Since the boardwalk contained a wide-open space underneath, it was a frequent location for such acts as looking up women's skirts, indecent exposure, and kissing. The boardwalk's maintenance was in active decline by the 1970s, although repairs on two sections of boardwalk between Brighton 1st and Brighton 15th Streets were underway by 1975. Local officials, such as then-assemblyman Chuck Schumer, and residents of the surrounding communities petitioned for the Board of Estimate to release $650,000 in funding for repairs to the boardwalk.

By the 1980s, the boardwalk was in poor condition; several people had been injured after falling through rotted portions of the boardwalk, the restrooms and drinking fountains were not functioning, and the section between West 32nd and West 33rd Street had collapsed completely. In 1983, officials estimated that one-quarter of the planks were not in good shape. The same year, New York City Comptroller Harrison J. Goldin rated the boardwalk's quality as "poor" due to holes and nails within the deck, vacant lots adjacent to the boardwalk, broken water fountains, and filthy restrooms. In 1985, a small part of the Coney Island Beach, as well as three other city beaches and Central Park's Sheep Meadow, were designated as "quiet zones" where loud radio playing was prohibited. Subsequent repairs to the boardwalk were completed by 1987.

In the early 1990s, as part of a $27 million shoreline protection project, the United States Army Corps of Engineers (USACE) filled in the area under the boardwalk with sand. Afterward, the space underneath became occupied by persons who were homeless, so in 1996 the city cleared out the encampment and fenced off the space under the boardwalk. Brooklyn borough president Howard Golden said in 1997 that he considered the boardwalk's condition to be "B-plus"; according to Golden, the largest problems were that some rails and signs needed to be fixed. On the other hand, residents had complained the previous year that the boardwalk had loose and cracked boards, holes in the wood, and uneven pilings. City vehicles frequently used the boardwalk despite exceeding the weight limit; furthermore, NYC Parks only had three employees to maintain the boardwalk year-round, as compared to eight in 1990. NYC Parks contended that it had spent $180,000 on a recent project to repair the boardwalk and that the Brooklyn borough president's office had budgeted $20 million since 1981 for repairs.

=== 21st century ===
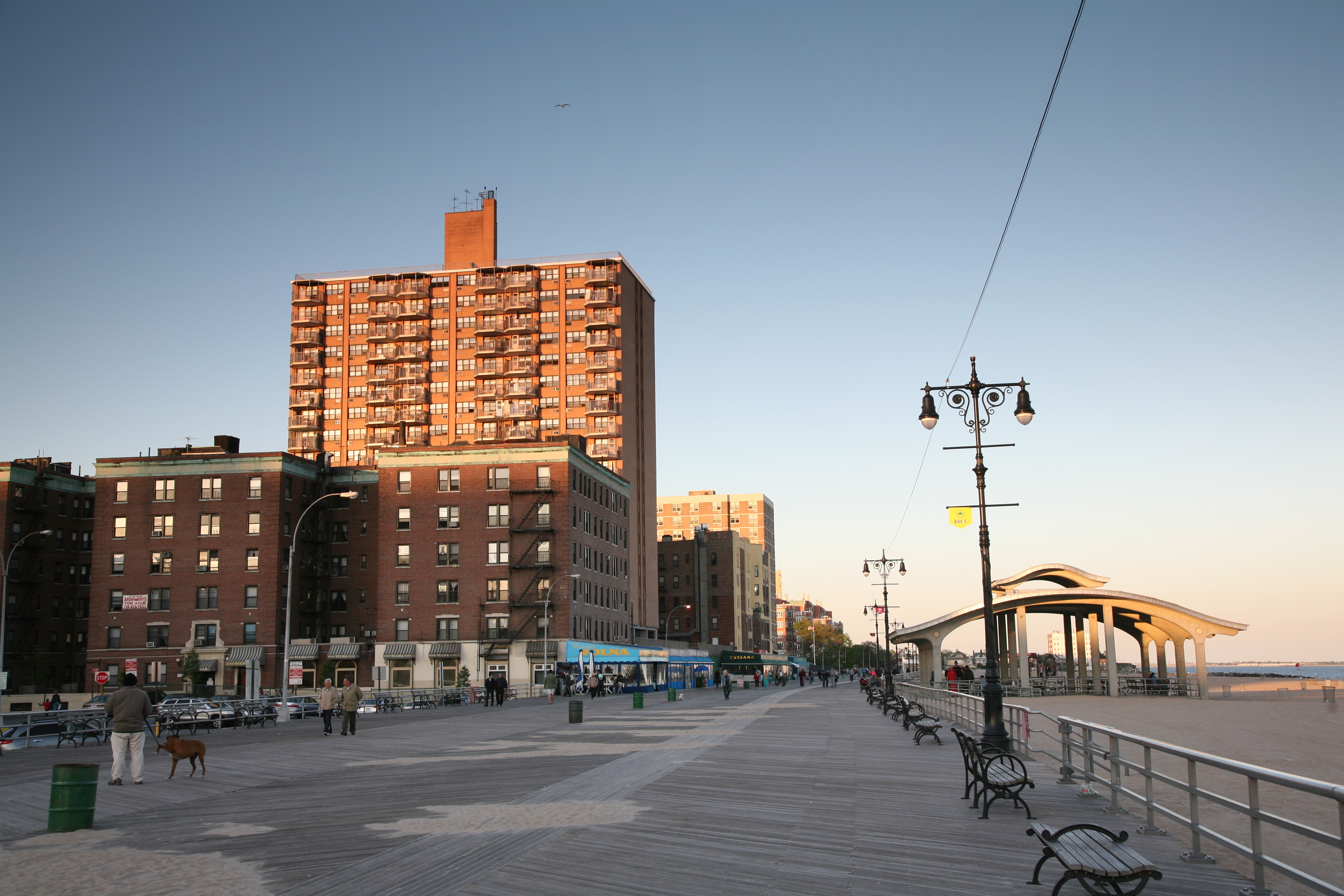
Brighton Beach section of the boardwalk in 2008

NYC Parks started re-planking the boardwalk with ipe wood in the early 1990s, though this was opposed by environmental group Rainforest Relief, who objected to the wood being logged from the Amazon rainforest. New comfort stations and shade pavilions were added around 2001. Though the boardwalk was well-known, the New York City Landmarks Preservation Commission (LPC) had not received any requests to designate the boardwalk as an official landmark by the 2000s. LPC chairman Robert B. Tierney said in 2003 that the boardwalk was unlikely to be protected as a city landmark because it had been drastically modified over the years.

==== Initial renovations and landmark status ====
By 2010, the city government was renovating the boardwalk: some sections were receiving new wood planking over concrete supports, while others were being replaced entirely with concrete. The addition of the concrete sections was controversial. Though concrete was cheaper and did not require wood sourced from the Amazon rainforest, many local residents and officials felt that wood would be more authentic. There was no logistical difficulty in securing wood because the Rockaway Boardwalk was simultaneously being rebuilt in that material. After installing two small concrete sections of the boardwalk, NYC Parks proposed using a type of plastic that resembled wood. The rebuild with concrete and plastic was approved in March 2012, though wood advocates later filed a lawsuit to stop the use of concrete. The boardwalk was slightly damaged during Hurricane Sandy that October, and the adjacent amusement parks and aquarium suffered more severe damage, as did Steeplechase Pier. Further comfort stations were added in 2013, with four modular units being delivered to West 8th, West 2nd, Brighton 2nd, and New Brighton Streets.

In late 2014, NYC Parks started repairing the section between Coney Island Avenue and Brighton 15th Street with concrete. The decision to use concrete and plastic was again controversial, but according to NYC Parks, was necessary to repair decades of use and deterioration. That December, after the repairs were announced, City Council members Mark Treyger and Chaim Deutsch suggested designating the boardwalk as a scenic landmark. The LPC initially rejected the application, stating that the boardwalk had been too heavily altered. NYC Parks completed the repairs in May 2016. Despite the rejection of landmark status, Treyger continued to advocate for the Riegelmann Boardwalk's preservation. In March 2018, the LPC voted to "calendar" a public hearing to determine whether the boardwalk should be designated. The commission designated the boardwalk as the city's eleventh scenic landmark two months later, on May 15, 2018. The same month, two comfort stations opened at Brighton 15th Street. The city government announced in November 2019 that it would spend $3.2 million to place anti-terrorism bollards at entrances to the boardwalk, as part of a larger initiative to improve safety in public areas following a deadly 2017 truck attack in Manhattan.

==== Planned reconstruction ====
Starting in 2021, NYC Parks hired a team of carpenters to repair parts of the boardwalk between March and November of each year. NYC Parks announced in November 2021 that it would renovate the entirety of the Riegelmann Boardwalk for $114.5 million. The renovation would be conducted in several phases, although only one phase was funded. The boardwalk would remain open during the project. The plans include replacing the hardwood planks with recycled plastic, renovating furniture, and constructing concrete piers to replace deteriorated wooden supports. The plan had to be approved by mayor-elect Eric Adams, who, as borough president, had opposed the previous proposal to replace the wooden deck with plastic and concrete. In mid-2022, city councilman Ari Kagan expressed concerns that the city government did not include any additional funding for the boardwalk's renovation in its 2022 budget. The $114.5 million grant was only sufficient to fund repairs to a 3-mile (4.8 km) section of the boardwalk.

An investigation by news organization The City found that, from 2012 to 2022, the city government had spent several hundred thousand dollars to settle lawsuits by visitors who had been injured on the boardwalk. WCBS-TV also found that, between 2017 and 2022, thirty-one people claimed to have sustained injuries while on the boardwalk. Although NYC Parks had replaced over a thousand planks in mid-2022, the renovation project had not started by later that year. At the time, USACE was considering raising the boardwalk to 18 feet (5.5 m). If this plan were implemented, the boardwalk-raising project would not be completed until 2030. Alec Brook-Krasny, who was reelected (Note: Brook-Krasny had previously represented Coney Island in the Assembly until 2015.) to the New York State Assembly in 2022, proposed funding repairs to the boardwalk if a planned casino on Coney Island were approved, though the casino was ultimately rejected. By early 2023, NYC Parks was planning to rebuild the section from West 24th to West 27th Street for $11.5 million. Although that section was originally supposed to have been rebuilt by February 2022, work had not even started. Designs for the renovation were also delayed because the city needed to add wheelchair ramps.

In February 2025, the city government announced plans to upgrade the western end of the Riegelmann Boardwalk as part of the Coney Island West project, for which a developer was to be selected later that year. NYC Parks and the New York City Economic Development Corporation announced that December that the boardwalk would be renovated as part of a $1 billion project, though work was not scheduled to start for at least two years. The renovation included replacing dilapidated decks and supports; making the boardwalk 80 feet (24 m) wide for its entire length; and replacing some lifeguard towers, pavilions, and restrooms. By then, the boardwalk was in such bad shape that nails and shards were sticking out at some places, and the city government had covered some holes in the deck with plywood. Residents continued to report dangerous conditions on the boardwalk, and in 2026 they asked the city to make emergency repairs before the renovation started. That October, the city issued a request for qualifications to solicit bids for a design team.

== Impact ==
=== Cultural significance ===
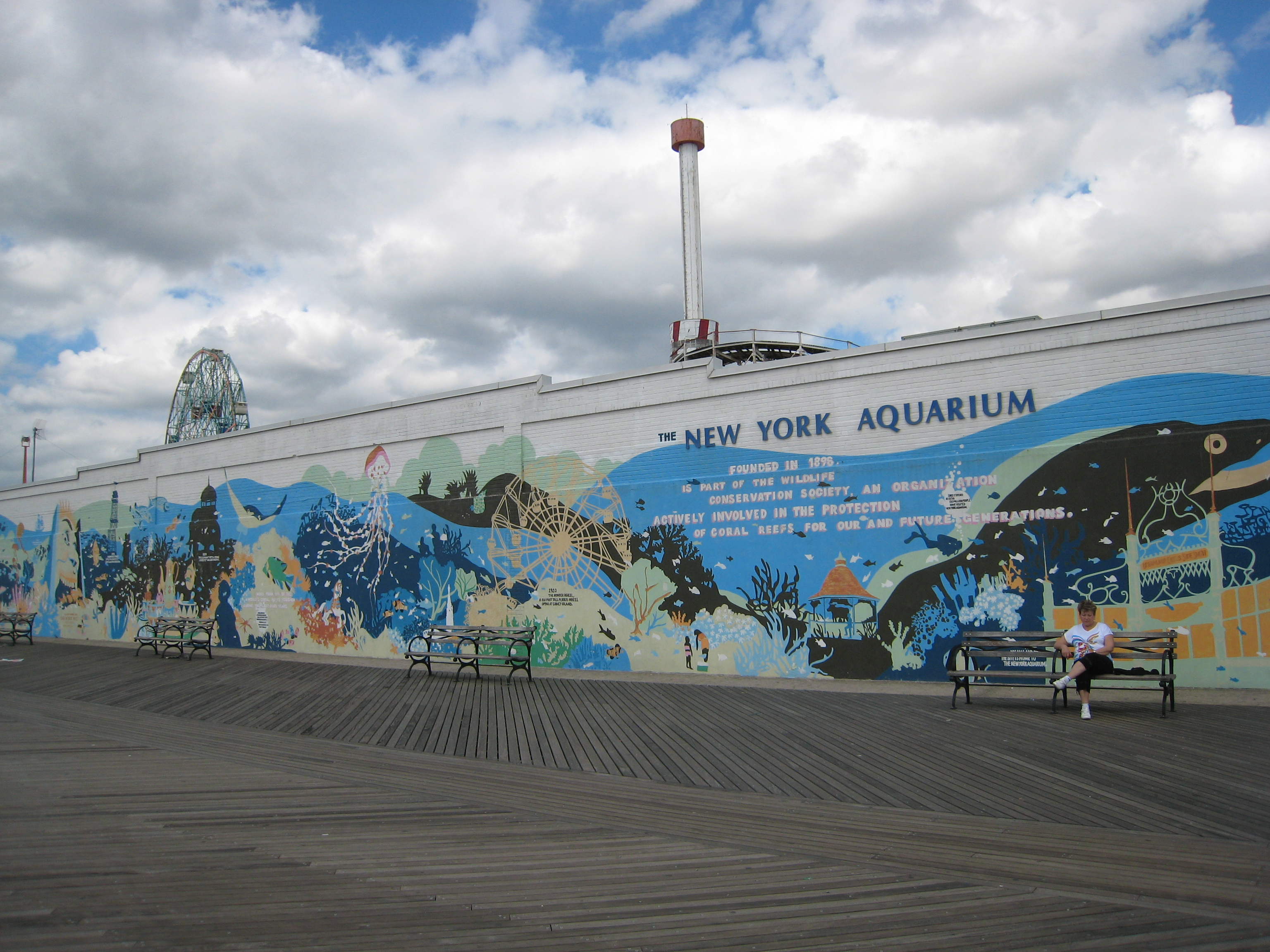
The boardwalk outside the New York Aquarium

The Riegelmann Boardwalk opened up the beach to the millions who visited Coney Island in its heyday, supplanting Surf Avenue as the area's "Main Street". A 1923 guidebook described the area as "the oldest, most densely crowded and most democratic" of all the amusement areas around New York City. The boardwalk increased international visitation to Coney Island. One French observer wrote of the boardwalk, shortly after its opening, "Families which cannot go to the rich watering places come in hordes on Sunday to enjoy the municipal beach. It is like the Promenade des Anglais at Nice turned over to the proletariat." A writer for the Brooklyn Daily Eagle cited the boardwalk's completion as "a contributing factor in the modernizing of the Coney Island section", saying that its construction had led to the development of apartment buildings on the Coney Island peninsula.

The boardwalk is the setting for two large annual events. The Nathan's Hot Dog Eating Contest takes place every July 4 outside the original Nathan's Famous location at Surf and Stillwell Avenues near the boardwalk. Nathan's had been one of several hot dog vendors that formerly lined Coney Island. The Coney Island Mermaid Parade has taken place along the boardwalk since 1983. The parade typically occurs every June, and involves floats and costumes and a King Neptune and Queen Mermaid that are crowned at the end of each parade.

As an icon of Coney Island, the Riegelmann Boardwalk has been depicted in the visual arts, music, and film. Several artworks have shown the boardwalk as a focal point, including Harry Roseland's 1930s depictions of the boardwalk and beach, as well as the 1938 lithograph The People Play-Summer by Benton Murdoch Spruance. Films have used the boardwalk as a setting or as a plot narrative, such as Sinners' Holiday (1930), Little Fugitive (1953), Annie Hall (1977), The Warriors (1979), and Requiem for a Dream (2000). The boardwalk has appeared in TV shows, including children's shows such as Dora the Explorer and sitcoms such as Seinfeld. It is also a setting in music videos, such as those by Air Supply (1982), Salt-N-Pepa (1993) and Beyoncé (2013), and albums such as Coney Island Baby (1975).

=== Accolades and landmark designations ===
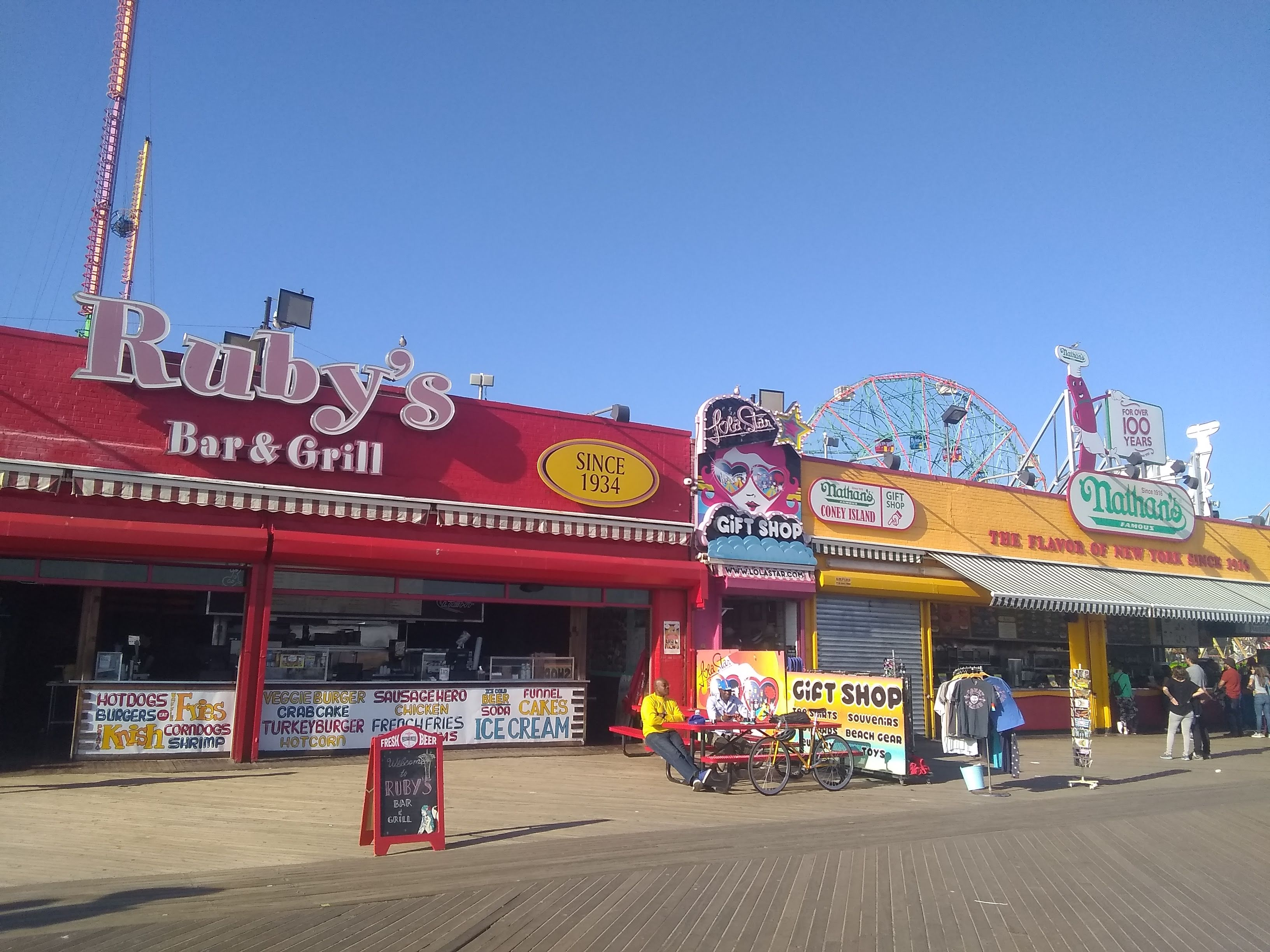
Ruby's and Nathan's, two longtime restaurants on the boardwalk

At the time of its construction, the boardwalk was considered the most important public works project in Brooklyn since the Brooklyn Bridge, which had been completed in 1883. One newspaper described the project thus: "New York scientists and engineers have succeeded where King Canute failed to halt the onward march of the tides." The boardwalk immediately became one of Coney Island's biggest draws after its opening. A columnist for the Brooklyn Times-Union wrote in 1932 that, so powerful was the boardwalk's effect, "the boardwalk and Coney Island are now synonymous".

In 1994, the American Shore & Beach Preservation Association recognized the boardwalk as an "infrastructure accomplishment" comparable to the Catskill Watershed and Central Park. In giving the award, the ASBPA stated that the boardwalk had served people who would otherwise "not have access to exclusive Long Island beaches". The city's Landmarks Preservation Commission designated the boardwalk as one of the city's scenic landmarks in 2018, having previously rejected it for landmark status.

== See also ==
- List of boardwalks in the United States
- List of New York City Designated Landmarks in Brooklyn
