= Georgetown University Student Association =

Student government of Georgetown University

- Abbreviation: GUSA
- Formation: 1984
- Members: 6,675 undergraduate students
- President: Darius Wagner (CAS '27)
- Vice President: Nazgol Missaghi (CAS '28)
- Website: gustudentassociation.com

The Georgetown University Student Association (GUSA) is the undergraduate student government of Georgetown University in Washington, D.C. The GUSA bylaws state that the organization's mission is "to (i) empower Hoyas by giving them control over resources, (ii) improve the student quality of life, (iii) safeguard Hoya rights, (iv) involve Hoyas in the governance of the University, and (v) ensure that the University conducts itself in an ethical and responsible manner."

== Structure ==
=== Executive Branch ===
The Executive Branch is made up of a President and Vice President, elected by the undergraduate student body each November to lead for the following calendar year, as well as a staff whose size and structure is largely up to the discretion of the President and Vice President. Since 2023, the executive staff has been restructured and expanded to address many issues raised by members of the undergraduate student body. Membership on cabinet staff, executive staff, and general staff positions is application-based and open to all undergraduate students. The President and Vice President also appoint student representatives to a variety of external boards and committees, and all executive staff positions and external board appointments are subject to review and confirmation by the Senate.

Current and Former Executives
Year	President	Vice President
2025	Darius Wagner	Nazgol Missaghi
2025	Ethan Henshaw	Darius Wagner
2024	Jaden Cobb	Sanaa Mehta
2023	Camber Vincent	Alyssa Hirai
2022*	Kole Wolfe	Zeke Ume-Ukeje
2021-2022	Nile Blass	Nicole Sanchez
2020-2021	Bryce Badger	Nicolo Ferretti
2019-2020	Norman Francis Jr.	Aleida Olvera
2018-2019	Juan Martinez	Kenna Chick
2017-2018	Kamar Mack	Jessica Andino
2016-2017	Enushe Khan	Chris Fisk
2015-2016	Joe Luther	Connor Rohan

*Due to a change in election timelines, beginning in 2022 the GUSA Executive serves for a calendar year rather than a school year

=== Legislative Branch ===
The Legislative Branch is made up of a 29-person Senate which can amend the GUSA bylaws, confirm executive and judicial appointments, and engage in advocacy through mechanisms that include resolutions and ad hoc committees. The Senate is led by a Speaker and Vice Speaker during the academic year and over the summer. The Senate also controls the process by which more than $1 million is allocated to student organizations. The process is overseen by the Senate's Finance and Appropriations Committee, which allocates the sum total funds generated by the Student Activities Fee ($164 per student in 2018) each year to five club advisory boards, the Lecture Fund, the Georgetown Programming Board, and other groups.

Current and Former Senate Leadership
Senate	Speaker	Vice Speaker
22nd Senate November Session (October 2026 - April 2027)	Cameran Lane	Alessia Viscusi
21st Senate April Session (April 2026 - October 2026)	Cameran Lane	Roan Bedoian
21st Senate Nov. Session (Nov 2025 - Apr 2026)	Cameran Lane	Jacob Intrator
20th Senate Apr. Session (Apr 2025 - Nov 2025)	Saahil Rao	Zadie Weaver
20th Senate Nov. Session (Nov 2024 - Apr 2025)	Rhea Iyer	Meriam Ahmad
19th Senate Apr. Session (Apr 2024 - Nov 2024)	Meriam Ahmad	Rhea Iyer
19th Senate Nov. Session (Nov 2023 - Apr 2024)	Megan Skinner	Dylan Davis
18th Senate Apr. Session (Apr 2023 - Nov 2023)	Manahal Fazal	Joshua Bernard-Pearl Megan Skinner
18th Senate Nov. Session (Nov 2022 - Apr 2023)	Manahal Fazal	Alicia Gopal
17th Senate Apr. Session (Apr 2022 - Nov 2023)	Camber Vincent	Spencer Woodall
17th Senate Nov. Session (Nov 2021 - Apr 2022)	Leo Rassieur	Rowlie Flores

The April session runs from April to November consisting of 22 representatives before the new incoming Freshmen class holds elections. The November session runs from November to April with all 29 representatives after elections are held for the Freshmen Class and At-Large senate seats. Leadership elections are held the first meeting following each election cycle.

=== Judicial Branch ===
The Judicial Branch is made up of a 3-person Constitutional Council, which oversees all internal GUSA disputes and is charged with the stewardship of the GUSA Constitution.

== Legacy ==
Student government has been involved throughout its history in the establishment, expansion, and improvement of a plethora of student resources and services. This legacy includes the Georgetown University Transportation Shuttles (GUTS) system, which was founded in 1974 and expanded several times since then through the work of student government, and campus dining, whose improvement has been a focus of student government for decades. Other initiatives include:

- The Georgetown University Lecture Fund, which was founded by Student Government in the 1970s and became an independent organization in 2005
- The GeorgetownOne Card (GoCard), in whose 2001 creation GUSA played a pivotal role
- The Collegiate Readership Program, a GUSA initiative which provided students with free copies of major newspapers from 2008 to 2015, and 2023 onwards
- The Summer Fellows program, which was founded by GUSA in 2009 and now provides free on-campus summer housing to low-income students under the auspices of the Georgetown Scholarship Program (GSP)
  - Currently known as the Summer BRIDGE Housing Program from 2023 onwards
- The Student Advocacy Office (SAO), which was founded by GUSA in 2012 and continues to provide assistance to students navigating the university's disciplinary systems
- The Georgetown University Farmer's Market, which was organized by GUSA in 2018 and continues under its own board every Wednesday during the school year
- The Georgetown Student Mental Health Fund, which was organized by GUSA in 2018 with an initial contribution from GUSA, the Student Affairs Office, and an anonymous donor, helps fund students who are referred to off campus specialists from the Counseling and Psychiatry Services, ongoing funding is being supported by the Division of Student Affairs
- The Georgetown Disability Cultural Initiative, which welcomed its first Associate Director, Dr. Amy Kenny, in the summer of 2022 and later became the Disability Cultural Center in Fall 2023
- Other notable groups that the Georgetown University Student Association has founded over its duration include:
  - Students Advocating for Food Equity (SAFE)
  - The Georgetown University Coalition for Worker's Rights (GUCWR)
  - Inter-Academic Council (InterAC)
  - The Hoya Hub

Perhaps the most famous service established by student government is Students of Georgetown, Inc., also known as "The Corp", which was founded by SG President Roger Cochetti and Vice President Nancy Kent in October 1971. Until the early 1990s, the board of The Corp remained under the control of student government and the activities of the two organizations were closely linked.

In addition to improving student resources and services, student government at Georgetown has long played a central role in the allocation of resources to student activities. This has been the case since at least the 1970s, but a notable change occurred in 2001 when a GUSA-led effort successfully established a "Student Activities Fee" to be collected from all students as part of undergraduate tuition, and disbursed to all student organizations by GUSA itself. Today, GUSA allocates more than $1 million per year to eight advisory boards, which in turn allocate their funds to over 300 student organizations.

Student government has traditionally remained focused on student life, but at times the organization has also contributed its voice to political debates on campus and around the country. In 1997, for example, GUSA vocally supported the controversial addition of crucifixes to university classrooms. And in 2011, GUSA President Mike Meaney organized a group letter from more than 100 student body presidents to President Barack Obama and Speaker of the House John Boehner urging a bipartisan compromise on the national debt ceiling.

== History ==
=== Georgetown University Athletic Association: 1874 to 1920 ===
The earliest form of student government at Georgetown was the Georgetown University Athletic Association, which formed in 1874 in order to coordinate athletics amongst the students of Georgetown College. The Athletic Association was relatively informal in its structure and duties until 1889, when students drafted a constitution and began annual elections. Its leadership consisted of three elected students –– the Vice President, Secretary, and Treasurer –– as well as the managers of each athletic team and a Jesuit advisor who held the symbolic title of "President". That symbolism was soon relinquished, however, and by 1900 the student leader of the Athletic Association was called its President. The Association's duties were almost entirely athletic in nature; it coordinated schedules for athletic practices and games, managed the sharing of athletic equipment, and raised funds in order to support activities related to athletics and school spirit.

The Athletic Association was also called "The Yard" interchangeably, in likely reference to the College Yard in which athletic games were played. Its annual leaders were thus referred to as the Yard President, Yard Secretary, and Yard Treasurer.

=== The 3 Student Councils: 1920 to 1969 ===
In 1920, a College Student Council was formed with representatives from each class year. The Athletic Association continued to exist for the limited purpose of coordinating athletics, but the College Student Council supplanted it as the most important and authoritative elected body of the College and thus assumed the title "The Yard". Unlike the Athletic Association, the Student Council's duties were wide-ranging, including advocacy for student interests and the coordination of social life in the College. Students in the College continued to elect three executives each year –– the Yard President, Yard Secretary, and Yard Treasurer –– who oversaw both the old Athletic Association and the new College Student Council.

In 1940, the students of Georgetown College approved a new constitution for the College Student Council which included representation for the College's most significant student organizations alongside the representatives of each class. Over the next thirty years, the organizations represented on the Council would include the Georgetown College Journal, the Collegiate Club, the Glee Club, The Hoya, the International Relations Club, Mask and Bauble, the Philodemic Society, the Sodality, the Washington Club, and WGTB Radio.

Around the same time that the College Student Council was formed in 1920, the students of the newly-established School of Foreign Service (SFS) founded an SFS Student Council. Like its original College counterpart, the SFS Student Council included representatives from each class year as well as the whole school and took on a variety of responsibilities including advocacy and social life. When the School of Languages and Linguistics was founded in 1949 and the School of Business in 1957, their student bodies were incorporated into the SFS Student Council's representative infrastructure. By the early 1960s, the group was called the "East Campus Student Council" or "Walsh Area Student Council" to reflect the fact that its constituency now included three undergraduate schools but that all three schools were located on Georgetown's "East Campus" (the block between 35th and 36th Streets NW, on which the Walsh Building stands).

At some point in the 1940s or 50s, the students of the Nursing School founded the Nursing School Student Council, which, like its SFS counterpart, included class representatives and school-wide elected officers but not representatives of student organizations. The first women to hold elected office in student government at Georgetown did so on the Nursing School Student Council, since the school was originally open only to women.

Administrative collaboration and social interaction between Georgetown's five separate undergraduate schools began to increase in the 1950s and 60s, and by the mid-60s there was an unprecedented sense of shared community amongst students of the five schools. Students also began to recognize the practical benefits of university-wide collaboration on the issues that affected students in all schools equally. As a result, several attempts were made throughout the 1960s to unify the three disparate student councils. Unification efforts were finally successful in March 1968, when a referendum passed among the constituencies of all three student councils. In December 1968, students from all schools elected 40 delegates to a constitutional convention, which was charged with drafting a structure for the new, unified student government. The convention released its plans within a few months, and the first university-wide student government election was held in May 1969.

=== Student Government (SG): 1969 to 1984 ===
Simply called the Student Government (SG), the new unified institution included a President and Vice President elected by the entire student body, and a Senate with 5 students elected from each school and 5 from each class (40 in total).

=== Georgetown University Student Association (GUSA): 1984 to present ===
In 1984, students replaced the SG with the Georgetown University Student Association (GUSA), a new institution that over time came to be loosely based on the tripartite structure of the federal government of the United States. GUSA's executive branch included a President and Vice President, elected annually by the student body. Its legislative branch consisted of a 16-person Assembly, with 4 representatives from each class year––thus eliminating the last vestiges of differentiated representation for the five schools. After 1990, GUSA also had a judicial branch, consisting of a 3-person Constitutional Council empowered to resolve constitutional disputes within the student government.

The GUSA Constitution has been amended three times:

- In March 1990, students replaced the original GUSA Constitution with a shorter, more streamlined document. They also created a Constitutional Council.
- In October 2006, students replaced the Assembly with the Senate, a larger body made up of representatives from geographic districts across Georgetown's campus.
- In February 2018, students voted to maintain the Senate's larger size but return it to a system of representation based on class year, rather than geography.

== Notable alumni ==
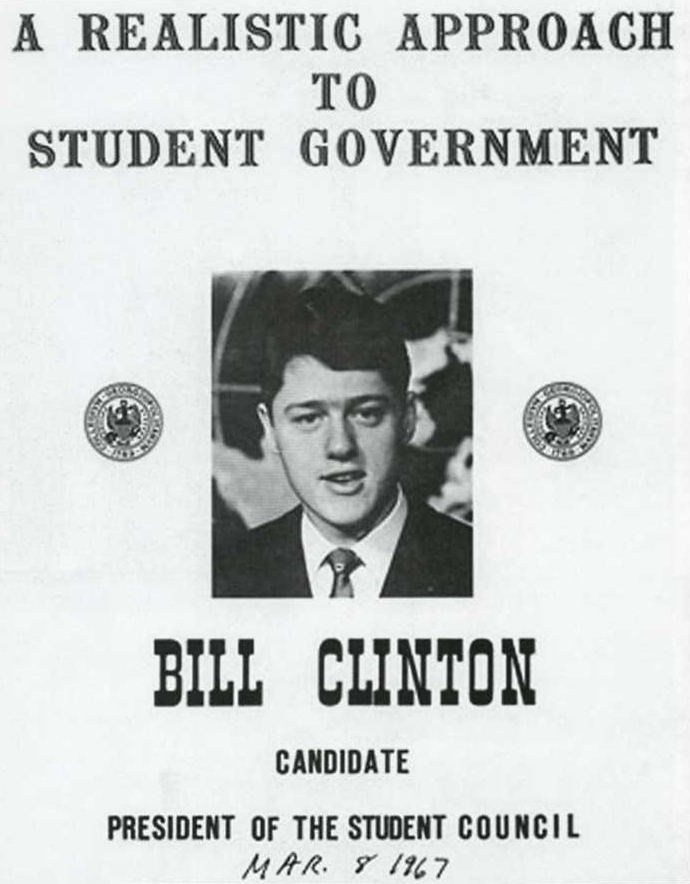
U.S. President Bill Clinton ran for the presidency of the East Campus Student Council in spring 1967 (his junior year), but lost to Terrence Modglin. This flyer advertised his candidacy.

Many notable individuals in business, politics, religion, and the arts began their careers in Georgetown's student government, including:

- Condé M. Nast (C 1894), Secretary of The Yard in 1892–93 and founder of the Condé Nast publishing empire
- Matthew R. Denver (C 1891), Vice President of The Yard in 1891–92 and a member of Congress from Ohio
- James P. B. Duffy (C 1901), President of The Yard in 1900–01 and a member of Congress from New York
- Philip A. Hart (C 1934), President of The Yard in 1933–34 and a Senator from Michigan
- George H. Guilfoyle (C 1935), President of The Yard in 1934–35 and a Roman Catholic Bishop
- Richard J. McCooey (C 1952), President of The Yard in 1951–52 and founder of Georgetown restaurants 1789, The Tombs, and F. Scott's
- Joseph R. Baczko (F 1967), Treasurer of the East Campus Student Council in 1965–66, President of Blockbuster Entertainment, and founder and President of Toys "R" Us
- Frank A. Keating (C 1966), President of The Yard in 1965–66 and Governor of Oklahoma
- William J. Clinton (F 1968), freshman class president in 1964–65, sophomore class president in 1965–66, and the 42nd President of the United States
- William Doyle (C 1972), freshman representative to The Yard in 1968–69 and Chair of the Georgetown University Board of Directors
- Jack W. Leslie (F 1976), President of the Student Government in 1974–75 and Chairman of Weber Shandwick and the U.S. African Development Foundation
- David L. Goldwyn (C 1981), President of the Student Government in 1980–81, Assistant Secretary of Energy from 1999 to 2001, and National Security Deputy to the US Ambassador to the United Nations from 1997 to 1998
- S. Fitzgerald Haney (F 1990), President of GUSA in 1989–90 and Ambassador to Costa Rica
- Stephanie H. Sandlin (C 1993), Chair of the GUSA Assembly in 1992–93, a member of Congress from South Dakota, and President of Augustana University
- Richard R. Heitzmann (B 1994), President of GUSA in 1993–94 and co-founder of venture capital firm FirstMark Capital
- John P. Cronan (C 1998), President of GUSA in 1997–99 and a United States District Judge of the United States District Court for the Southern District of New York, formerly Acting Assistant Attorney General for the Department of Justice's Criminal Division
- John Glennon (C 1999), President of GUSA in 1998–99 and Headmaster of Georgetown Preparatory School
- Mohammed bin Hamad Al Thani (F 2009), first President of GU-Q SGA in 2006–07 and Managing Director of the Qatar Supreme Committee for the 2022 FIFA World Cup

== GU-Qatar Student Government Association (GU-Q SGA) ==
Georgetown University in Qatar-Student Government Association
- Abbreviation: GU-Q SGA
- President: Ali Nasir (SFS '26)
- Vice President: Yasmin Ahmed (SFS '28)
- Chief of Staff: Pragyan Sharma (SFS '28)
- Public Relations Officer: AlJouri Al-Tamimi (SFS '28)

The Georgetown University in Qatar-Student Government Association (GU-Q SGA) is an annually elected, student-run governance association that works to represent the student body of Georgetown University in Qatar and liaise with university administrators. In addition, The President of SGA chairs the Student Liaison Commission (SLC), and The Vice President chairs the Student Activities Commission (SAC). The SGA has 11 members, replaced annually. An executive group made up of the President, the Vice President, the Chief of Staff and the Public Relations Officer guide and preside over the functions of the SGA. A core group of 8 members represents the interests of the student body, with two representatives from each undergraduate class. The SGA meets on a weekly basis and discusses the issues or concerns raised by the student body. The introduction of the Red Square, a replica of the famous Red Square in Georgetown University's main campus in Washington D.C., was a result of an initiative of the SGA led by President Malak Elmoh (SFS '21).

Sheikh Mohammed bin Hamad bin Khalifa Al Thani (SFS '09), the first President of the SGA was elected in 2006. The list of the former Presidents of the Student Government Association is as follows:

List of the Presidents of the SGA
Year	Name
2006-2007	Mohammed bin Hamad bin Khalifa Al Thani
2007-2008	Hanouf Al Buainain
2008-2009	Asma Al Addawi
2009-2010	Hadi Darwishi
2010-2011	Zainab El Fil
2011-2013	William YangUn Cha
2013-2014	Mohamed Sirelkhatim
2014-2015	Yoonsuk Choi
2015-2016	Abdullah Ahmad
2016-2017	Dialla Jandali
2017-2018	Noor Sheikh
2018-2019	Malak Elmoh
2019-2020	Abdullah Al-Malki
2020-2021	Mariam Kvaratskhelia
2021-2022	Maryam Al-Khater
2022-2023	Benjamin Kurian
May 2023-December 2023	Mohammed Jaski
January 2024-May 2024	Maryam Al-Ansari
2024-2025	Nagla Abdelhady
2025-2026	Ali Nasir

The Senate of GU-Q SGA is made up of two class representatives from each batch at GU-Q. They work alongside the SGA President and the executive board to accomplish and meet the student needs.

Apart from its role in representing students within Georgetown University in Qatar (GU-Q), the SGA also plays a vital role in representing GU-Q students within the Education City Student Government Association (ECSGA). The ECSGA is an initiative that was founded by President Hadi Darvishi in 2009, with the goal of uniting the student governments of the various universities in Education City. This platform allows for collaboration, shared initiatives, and a collective student voice across the different institutions, strengthening the overall student experience in Education City. The ECSGA provides a space where student leaders from universities such as Georgetown, Texas A&M, Carnegie Mellon, Weill Cornell, Northwestern, Virginia Commonwealth, and others can work together, address common concerns, and advocate for student needs on a broader level. By being part of the ECSGA, the GU-Q SGA extends its influence and advocacy efforts beyond its own campus, contributing to the larger Education City community.

In 2022, the Georgetown University in Qatar (GU-Q) Student Government Association (SGA) hosted a landmark meeting of the Education City Student Government Association (ECSGA) at their campus. This event was particularly significant as it marked the first ECSGA meeting after a hiatus of four years. It brought together the Presidents and Vice Presidents from all the Student Government Associations across Education City. The meeting presided by President Kurian, served as a key moment for collaboration and discussion among the various student leaders from the institutions based in Education City, fostering a renewed sense of community and cooperation. In 2023, President Benjamin Kurian inaugurated the new website of the SGA during the SGA Town hall at GU-Q Auditorium. It was in the same year that the new amendments to the constitution was approved and signed into effect by President Kurian. He also laid the foundations for the SGA by-laws.

GU-Q SGA also holds strong connections with Georgetown University Student Association(GUSA) and Georgetown University Graduate Student Government (GradGov), as part of the ‘One Georgetown’ initiative.

In 2024, GU-Q SGA established an Academic Council with cooperation from their counterparts in Washington D.C.

President Kvaratskhelia, who went on to pursue an accelerated masters program at the Washington D.C. campus, was elected the dual-degree MSFS rep for 2022-23. She was selected as the student speaker for the Georgetown University MSFS Commencement exercises in 2024.

SGA Senate 2025-26
Title	Name
Class Representative of 2026	Mahwash Sarwari Makhambet Ismailov
Class Representative of 2027	Alex Bonjoc (Spring 2026) Hissa Al-Hababi (Fall 2025) Lo'ay Ramadan (Spring 2026)
Class Representative of 2028	Ayan Mahmoud Velyutham Rama Subbiah
Class Representative of 2029	To-be-elected To-be-elected
