= John H. McCooey =

American politician

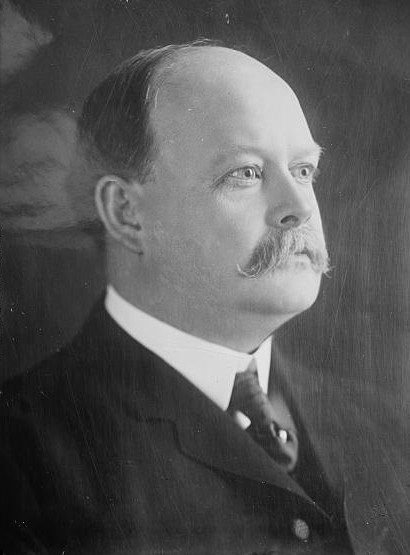

Member of the Democratic National Committee
- In office 1932–1934
- Preceded by: Norman E. Mack

Chair of the Kings County Democratic Party
- In office 1910–1934

Personal details
- Born: John Henry McCooey; July 18, 1864 Brooklyn, New York, U.S.
- Died: January 21, 1934 (aged 69) Brooklyn, New York, U.S.
- Party: Democratic
- Spouse: Catherine I. Sesnon (m. 1899)
- Relations: James J. Byrne (brother-in-law); Richard McCooey (grandson)
- Children: 4
- Occupation: Chief Clerk
- Nickname: Uncle John

John Henry McCooey (June 18, 1864 – January 21, 1934) also referred to as Uncle John was an American politician, civic leader and political boss in the Democratic Party political machine of Brooklyn, New York. He also served as chair of the Kings County Democratic Party from 1910 until his death in 1934.

== Early life and education ==
McCooey was born June 18, 1864 in Williamsburg, Brooklyn, the oldest of six children, to Patrick McCooey and Anna McCooey (née Hanlon). His father was an immigrant from Ireland. McCooey only had a limited education and reportedly worked at Morgan Iron Works aged 13. At an early age, McCooey became friends with John Francis Hylan, a future Mayor of New York City.

== Career ==
He developed the Madison Club, which became the strongest political organization in Kings County. McCooey served as secretary and president of the New York City Civil Service Commission from 1899 through 1903. He succeeded Hugh McLaughlin as Brooklyn boss in 1904. He was named to the Executive Committee of the county in 1909.

McCooey joined with Tammany Hall in 1925. In 1932, McCooey was chosen by the New York delegation to succeed Norman E. Mack as a member of the Democratic National Committee. McCooey and Tammany Hall leader John F. Curry joined to support Al Smith's candidacy for President of the United States over Franklin D. Roosevelt; after Roosevelt's triumph over Smith in the 1932 Democratic National Convention, the two backed Roosevelt. McCooey continued to serve on the Executive Committee until his death in 1934.

== Personal life ==
On January 17, 1899, McCooey married Catherine Irene "Kate" Sesnon, a daughter of Michael G. Sesnon and Anna "Annie" Sesnon (née McGuckin), both of Bensonhurst.

- John Henry McCooey, Jr. (1899–1948), served as Justice of the New York Supreme Court, married Helen Willis Cornell (1903–1971), three children.
- Herbert J. McCooey (1901–1936), married Elizabeth Larney (1901–1981), four children, including Richard McCooey.
- Adele Catherine McCooey (1903–1970), married George Cornelius Tilyou Jr. (1902–1958), a son of George C. Tilyou, four children.
- Everett David McCooey Sr. (1907–1971), married Mary Gertrude Ennis, three children.

McCooey was brother-in-law of James J. Byrne, a member of the New York State Assembly and Brooklyn Borough President. He died at his residence in Brooklyn on January 21, 1934 aged 69.

== See also ==
- List of United States political families
