= The Tombs (bar) =

Restaurant and bar in Washington, D.C.

- Interactive map of The Tombs

Restaurant information
- Established: July 23, 1962; 64 years ago
- Owner: Clyde's Restaurant Group
- Previous owner: Richard McCooey
- Location: 1226 36th Street NW, Washington, D.C., 20007, United States
- Coordinates: 38°54′22″N 77°04′14″W
- Website: www.tombs.com

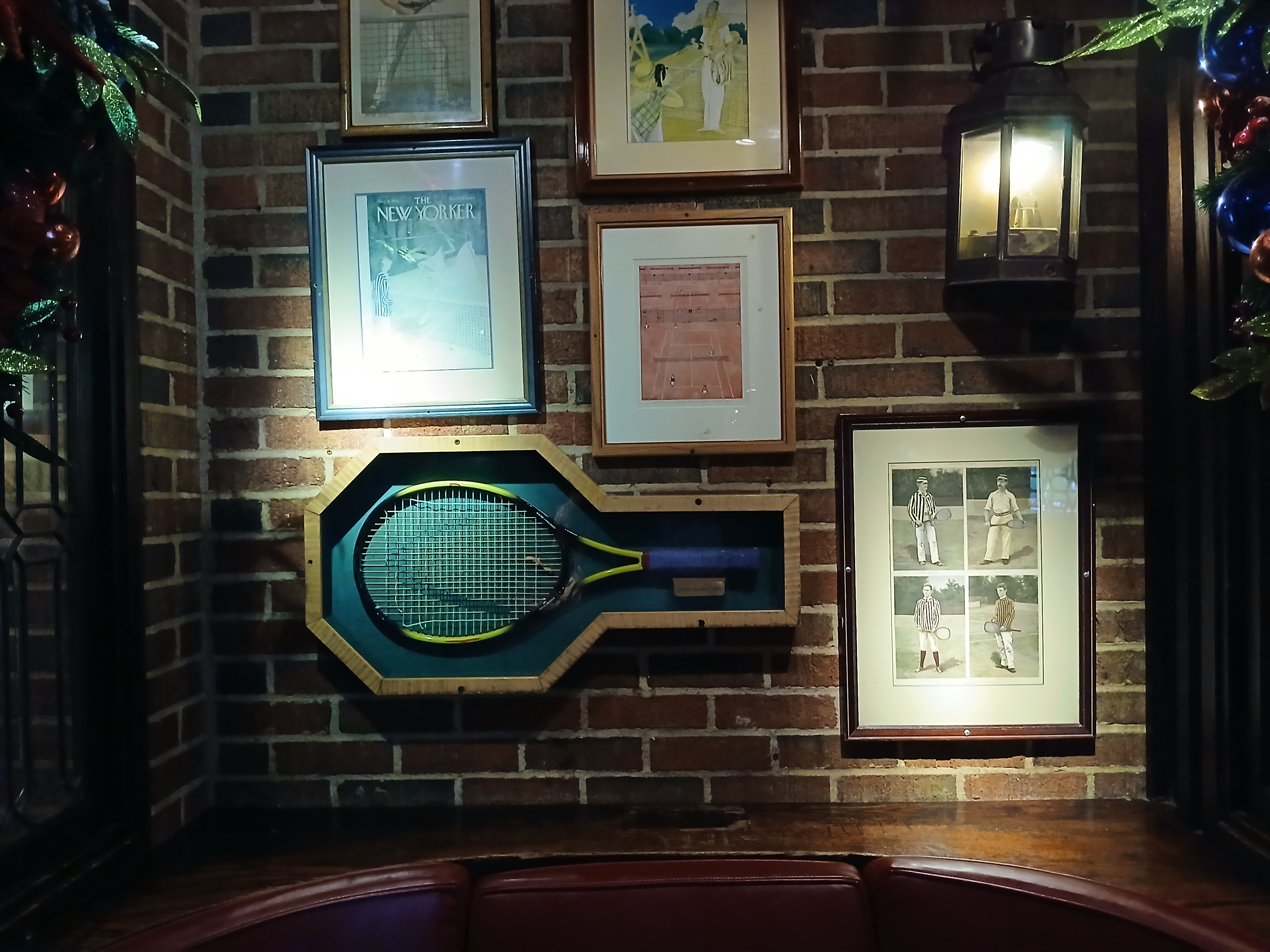
Typical wall decor inside the restaurant

The Tombs is a restaurant and bar located in the Georgetown neighborhood of Washington, D.C. It was opened on July 23, 1962, by restaurateur and Georgetown University graduate Richard McCooey as the below ground bar or rathskeller for his restaurant 1789. The Tombs is a popular destination for Georgetown University students and alumni, and has been ranked as one of the best college bars in America. It is well known for its collegiate rowing-themed interior design, as well as the 99 days club, a competition in which Georgetown seniors aim to eat or drink at the club for the final 99 days of the school year. In 1962, McCooey established the tradition of regular "Chimes Nights" where Georgetown's all-male a capella group, the Georgetown Chimes, would perform in the pub, inspired by the Whiffenpoofs' weekly performances at Yale's local establishment Mory's. The Chimes Night tradition continues. The restaurant was named after a fictional establishment mentioned in the poem "Bustopher Jones: The Cat About Town" by T. S. Eliot.

The Tombs was purchased by Clyde's Restaurant Group in 1985.

The Tombs has been used as a location in two movies set at Georgetown. One scene in The Exorcist, where Father Karras tells a fellow priest over dinner that he may be losing his faith, was filmed there. In 1985's St. Elmo's Fire, The Tombs serves as the movie's titular bar.
