= Metropolitan Male Quartet =

American all-male vocal quartet

The Metropolitan Male Quartet was a vocal quartet of men who performed in the New York City area in the years 1890 until about 1902.

The group consisted of Robert J. Webb (first tenor), Peter J. Collins (second tenor), James J. Byrne (baritone), and Richard Schumm (bass). For several years they appeared at amateur light opera presentations, in minstrel shows, and frequently as choir singers. The group became professional in 1895 at which time Byrne left to pursue other interests. Byrne later became Borough President of Brooklyn.
