= Georgetown Chimes =

American college a cappella group

- Origin: Washington, D.C.
- Genre: Collegiate a cappella
- Years active: 1946–present
- Website: georgetownchimes.org

The Georgetown Chimes is a collegiate a cappella group from Georgetown University in Washington, D.C. Founded in 1946 by Francis E. (Frank) Jones as a barbershop quartet, the group has had 296 members, and has recorded two dozen albums in its history. The Chimes are particularly well known for the annual a capella show they host each February, the Cherry Tree Massacre, which has been hosted for over 50 years. Within Washington, D.C., the Chimes are known for hosting regular "Chimes Nights" at the Tombs, a popular rathskeller bar in the Georgetown neighborhood. Additionally, the Chimes are regularly featured as guests in the DC A Cappella Festival (DCAF). The Chimes' alumni includes politicians and public figures, such as U.S. Senator from Georgia Jon Ossoff and Jeff Civillico.

The Chimes House is located at 3611 Prospect Street NW, Washington, DC.
