= Richard McCooey =

Richard J McCooey (October 14, 1930 – August 6, 2014) was an American restaurateur and restaurant design consultant. He founded and designed the Washington, D.C. restaurants 1789 and The Tombs. A graduate of Georgetown University in 1952, Richard lived most of his life in Georgetown, Washington, D.C.

== Early life and education ==
Born October 14, 1930, in Brooklyn, Richard McCooey was the third of four brothers Herbert, John, and Richard’s fraternal twin Robert. Richard's mother was Elizabeth Larney born in New York to John Edward Larney and Mary Ellen Larney, and his father was Herbert, a NY attorney. Herbert died in 1936 at the age of 35, when Richard was six. His mother later remarried and the family moved from Brooklyn, New York to Bronxville, New York. Richard's grandfather was John H McCooey an American politician most notable for his involvement as a political boss in the Democratic Party political machine of Brooklyn. Boss McCooey served as chair of the Kings County Democratic Party from 1910 until his death in 1934; significant to Al Smith and Franklin Delano Roosevelt. Richard attended Brooklyn Prep and then Iona Prep.

Richard graduated from Georgetown University with a Bachelor of Social Sciences (BSS) in both History and Government in 1952. His senior year at Georgetown, Richard was elected “President of the Yard,” the precursor to the Georgetown University Student Association, the current student government body on campus, and participated in the Army ROTC program.

Richard married Karen Marie Magnier McCooey in 1990 at Holy Trinity Catholic Church, their parish, located one block from the 1789, Tombs and Georgetown University on 36th Street. Their reception was held at 1789 Restaurant.

== Professional career ==
After graduation, Richard enlisted and was offered position in enlisted officer training school for the United States Air Force as a second lieutenant for 2 years, serving as Club Officer. After his service, McCooey worked at Benton & Bowles, an advertising agency in New York, NY.

In the early 1960s, Richard returned to Washington, D.C. at the invitation of the Rev. Edward B. Bunn, the president of Georgetown University from 1952 to 1964. Father Bunn finally agreed to Richard's vision of opening a restaurant and a student rathskeller near the main campus; a dream Richard had since his freshman year at Georgetown. In 1962, with support of the university which owned the land, Richard realized his dream, opening a restaurant named 1789 and a student rathskeller in the basement called The Tombs. Despite initial opposition from the Georgetown community, Richard, with the help of Eugene L. Stewart, Esq., also a Georgetown University alumnus and Georgetowner newspaper founder, Ami Stewart, won the legal battle 1960, 1, 1 "Town Gown".

Richard’s deep connection to Georgetown and to history inspired the naming of 1789 restaurant. There were 3 reasons why Richard came up with the name 1789: John Carroll, founded Georgetown in 1789, the first Catholic and Jesuit institution of higher learning in the United States. That year, too, the state legislature made the port of Georgetown a Maryland town. Finally, 1789 was the year the U.S. Constitution was enacted.

Richard named The Tombs after a poem from T.S. Eliot's "Old Possum's Book of Practical Cats” in “Bustopher Jones, The Cat About Town” enjoys lunch at the tomb. During his service in the Air Force, Richard’s nickname was “Bustopher Cat.”

1789 is decorated with original antiques in an upscale and classic “Old Georgetown” setting. The Tombs reflects themes of sports, the bar is surrounded by original World War One posters, while the Sweeps section celebrates rowing with original antique prints of the sport and oars painted in the colors of the great rowing collegiate teams. Richard loved Georgetown Rowing and supported them through the years; especially the Cadle years. Don Cadle was a coach at Georgetown and a key to the team's success when the program was revived half a century ago. A Rhodes Scholar and former Balliol College Boat Club rower at Oxford, Don Cadle came to Washington, D.C., to serve as a NASA official. While working at the agency, Cadle also coached the Georgetown crews. Within one season, the team was winning Dad Vails and racing in the Olympic Trials. Cadle led the Hoyas to tremendous success on the water and instilled in the team traditions that continue to this day.

The 1789 and The Tombs share a federal-style townhouse dating from the mid-1800s. In 1964, Richard established the tradition of the “Chimes Nights” for the Georgetown Chimes, inspired by the Whiffenpoofs’ weekly performances at Yale local establishment Morey’s.

Richard purchased two adjacent properties in the mid 1960s and opened a laundry and market. He re-envisioned the spaces and in 1975 opened F. Scott’s, a nightclub with art-deco design and ambiance, named for novelist F. Scott Fitzgerald. F, a distant cousin of Francis Scott Key, a Georgetowner famed for writing the national anthem, "The Star-Spangled Banner". After selling to Clyde's, F. Scott's was transformed into a private event space before closing in the summer of 2016. In 2018, it was disassembled and redesigned as a part of 1789 restaurant and named the 1789 Bar & Club Room.

In 1980 Richard along with fellow restaurateur, Stuart J. Long, and the president of Washington Boat Lines, Willem Polak, had received a $225,000 loan from the National Trust for Historic Preservation to buy and restore the 50-year-old yacht, the Williamsburg, now in poor condition at a Philadelphia dock. The project had drawn opposition from some local citizens' groups but apparently received all the necessary permits to proceed. In its heyday, the Williamsburg was used extensively by Harry Truman and briefly by Dwight Eisenhower, Winston Churchill and Joseph Stalin. President Eisenhower had the 243-foot ocean-going vessel decommissioned and sold in 1953 as a "needless luxury." It was turned into a floating restaurant in New Jersey. Since 1977, the yacht has served as home to a private Philadelphia club. Ultimately the project never got underway.

In 1985, Richard sold his restaurants to Clyde's Restaurant Group, a deal organized by John Laytham, President and CEO of Clyde’s, a graduate of Georgetown University (F'66), School of Foreign Service, and close friend of Richard. The restaurants remain in operation today by Clyde’s. The serene, white-tablecloth setting remains a frequent spot for fine dining for the Washington crowd, including Former President Barack Obama's dinner with German chancellor Angela Merkel.

Then in 1986 Richard founded his restaurant design company Persona Studios. Clyde’s was Persona Studios first client and Richard remained heavily involved in the design of their restaurants as they expanded. Over the next 20 years, Richard and Karen's Persona Studios developed a long list of design clients all across the country with some outside the US such as The Polo Club dining room at the Moscow Marriott Royal Aurora Hotel.

== Awards ==
In San Francisco 1966, Richard was the recipient of the Georgetown University John Carroll Award,. named after Archbishop John Carroll, the first Catholic bishop in North America and founder of Georgetown University and the University's highest alumni honor. Established in 1951, the John Carroll Award is conferred upon alumni whose achievements and record of service exemplify the ideals and traditions of Georgetown and its founder. McCooey was a longtime Georgetown volunteer, and previously served on the Board of Governors of the Georgetown University Alumni Association. In a surprise dinner in 2012 held on the 50th anniversary of the restaurants' opening, he added: "I am so appreciative. I did all I wanted to do. As a freshman, walking along this street, I had that dream. I kept the dream."

== Legacy ==
Richard died on August 6, 2014, in Greenwich, Connecticut at the age of 83 with Karen his wife of 24 years by his side. Richard lived his entire adult life in Georgetown, a community and a university for whom he worked his entire life. Karen held his funeral Mass at their parish, Holy Trinity Church in Georgetown. The Chimes, nearly all their alums and actives, sang and were an integral part of the liturgy.

Richard loved the sport of rowing and the GU rowers. He attended rowing regattas to spur on Georgetown University's teams and supported them over the years. It was in 1962 when he first opened the doors to the Tombs that Richard met the burgeoning Georgetown University Rowing Team. A new and faithful fellowship was forged. If Richard could be out on a launch to watch a race, he would be in heaven. $18,000 for a new launch was raised. It was christened the "Richard McCooey" in the Spring of 2015.

Richard's design legacy lives on through Karen who resides in Washington DC and works in Georgetown at her firm, Karen McCooey Design, designing restaurants and homes, and working on non-profit efforts in Richard's name.
