= Henry Hesterberg =

American politician from New York (1881–1950)

10th Brooklyn Borough President
- In office March 14, 1930 – December 11, 1933
- Preceded by: James J. Byrne
- Succeeded by: Peter A. Carey (Acting)

Personal details
- Born: September 15, 1881 New York City, U.S.
- Died: July 3, 1950 (aged 68) Midwood, Brooklyn, New York City, U.S.
- Party: Democratic
- Children: 3

Henry Hesterberg (September 15, 1881 – July 3, 1950) was an American politician who served as the 10th Brooklyn Borough President as a member of the Democratic party from March 14, 1930, until his resignation on December 11, 1933.

== Early life ==
Hesterberg was born on September 15, 1881, in Flatbush, Brooklyn to Henry Hesterberg and Marcella Minton. He married Wilhelmina C. Schimph and the couple had three children.

== Political career ==
Following the death of Brooklyn Borough President James J. Byrne on March 14, 1930, Hesterberg became acting Borough President and was ultimately elected interim borough president on April 2, 1930, by a unanimous vote of the Brooklyn aldermen. A special election was held to decide who would serve the remainder of Byrne's term on November 4, 1930, which Hesterberg won with 303,474 votes or 63.87%. Hesterberg ran for re-election in the 1933 election and won the Democratic primary on September 19, 1933, with 97,301 votes or 71.30%. However, in the general election on November 7, Hesterberg came in 2nd out of five candidates with 221,737 votes or 30.20% losing by a margin of 71,913 votes or 9.79% to Republican nominee Raymond Ingersoll. Hesterbeg resigned two weeks before the expected end of his term on December 11, 1933, in order to accept a position on the city Water Board.

Following his loss, Hesterberg continued to serve as a member of the New York Democratic State Committee until 1936 and again in 1948. He was also a delegate to the Democratic National Convention from New York in the 1932, 1936 and 1940 elections.

== Death ==
Hesterberg lived at 536 East Nineteeth Street in Flatbush, Brooklyn, where he was taken to a hospital and died at Midwood Hospital in Midwood, Brooklyn three weeks later.

== See also ==
- List of borough presidents of New York City

Political offices
Preceded by James J. Byrne	Brooklyn Borough President; 1930-1933	Succeeded by Peter A. Carey (Acting)
