= Frank McCooey =

Australian rules footballer

Personal information
- Full name: Francis Sylvester McCooey
- Born: 26 September 1888; St Kilda, Victoria
- Died: 19 August 1962 (aged 73); Toorak, Victoria
- Original team: Xavier College
- Height: 174 cm (5 ft 9 in)
- Weight: 67 kg (148 lb)

Playing career^{1}
Years	Club	Games (Goals)
1906	Melbourne	4 (0)
- ^{1} Playing statistics correct to the end of 1906.

Francis Sylvester McCooey (26 September 1888 – 19 August 1962) was an Australian rules footballer who played with Melbourne in the Victorian Football League (VFL).
