= Brooklyn Municipal Building =

Building in Brooklyn, New York

Justice Ruth Bader Ginsburg Municipal Building
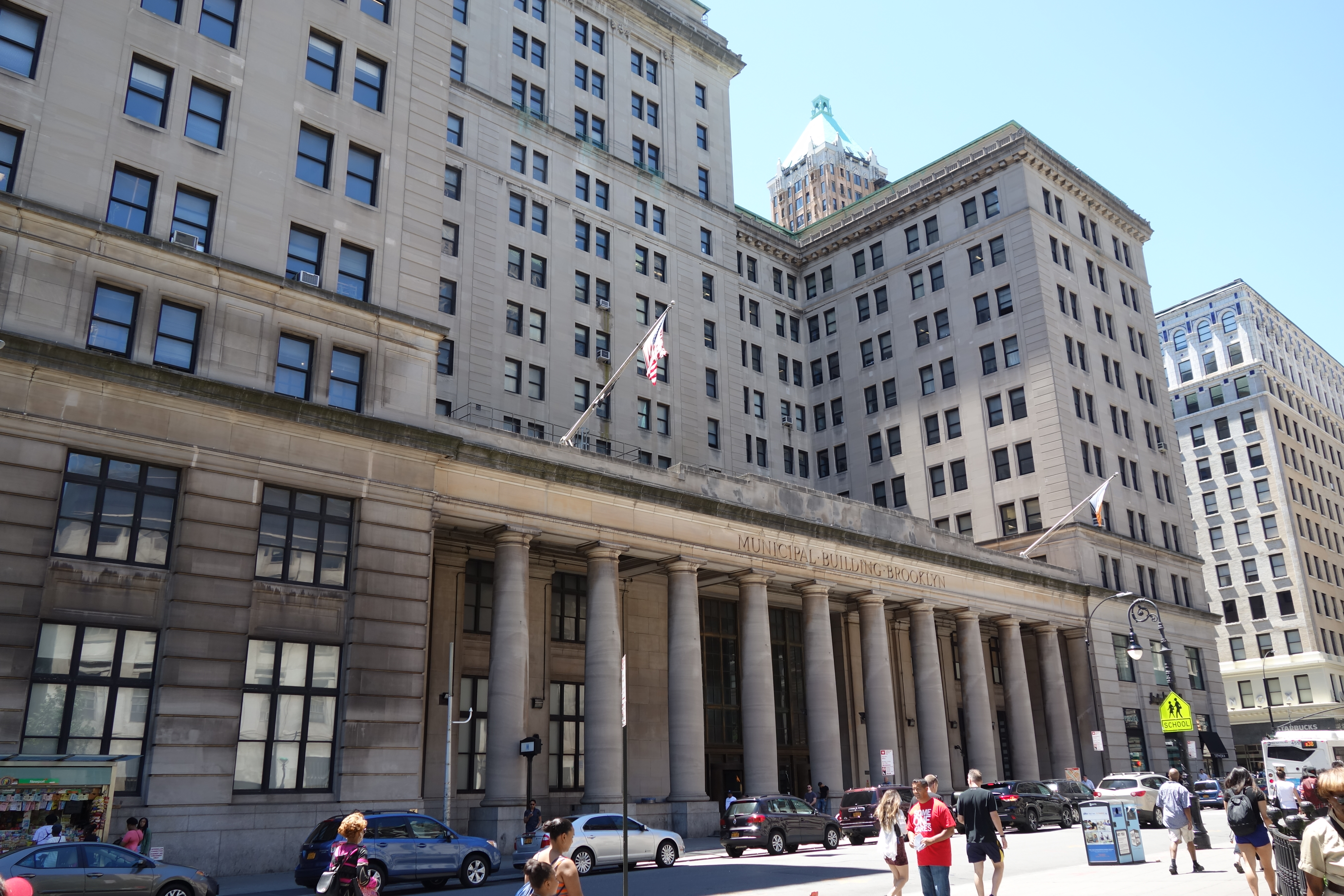
- Interactive map of the Justice Ruth Bader Ginsburg Municipal Building area
- Former names: Brooklyn Municipal Building
- Etymology: Ruth Bader Ginsburg

General information
- Status: Completed
- Type: Government (Municipal)
- Location: Downtown Brooklyn, 210 Joralemon St, Brooklyn, New York City, United States
- Coordinates: 40.6921°N 73.9905°W
- Current tenants: New York City Department of Buildings; New York City Department of Environmental Protection; New York City Department of Finance; New York City Department of Probation; New York City Marriage Bureau
- Opened: 1924
- Cost: $5,800,000

Design and construction
- Architecture firm: McKenzie, Voorhees & Gmelin

Website
- www1.nyc.gov/site/dcas/business/dcasmanagedbuildings/brooklyn-municipal-building.page

The Justice Ruth Bader Ginsburg Municipal Building, also known as the Brooklyn Municipal Building, is a civic building at 210 Joralemon Street in the Downtown Brooklyn neighborhood of New York City, built in 1924. Designed by McKenzie, Voorhees & Gmelin, it cost $5,800,000. It contains a branch of the New York City Clerk's office (including a detail of the New York City Marriage Bureau) and branch offices for the Departments of Buildings, Probation, Finance, and Environmental Protection.

In July 2012, the Landmark Preservation Commission approved an upgrade to the first few stories and add much commercial signage. In 2016, renovation was done on two cellar levels and two floors.

== Renaming ==
In 2020, it was announced that the building would be renamed for the late Ruth Bader Ginsburg, who was born and raised in Brooklyn. New York City Mayor Bill de Blasio attributed this honor to the “great things on the world stage” this Brooklynite had done.

On Monday March 15, 2021, the Brooklyn Municipal Building was renamed after United States Supreme Court Justice Ruth Bader Ginsburg in a ceremony attended by Mayor Bill de Blasio, First Lady Chirlane McCray, Brooklyn Borough President Eric Adams, and the family of Ruth Bader Ginsburg. Borough President Adams first pitched the name change to the mayor in September 20, 2018, through a letter which cited Ginsburg's many connections to the borough.

The building was officially renamed on March 15, 2021, in a ceremony that included the mayor, the Brooklyn borough president, and relatives of the late justice.
