= Stuart Davidson =

Stuart Davidson may refer to:

- Stuart Davidson, British policeman who wrote a blog under the pseudonym PC David Copperfield
- Stuart Davidson (cricketer) (born 1972), Zimbabwean-born former Scottish cricketer
- Stuart Davidson (footballer) (born 1979), Scottish footballer
- Stuart C. Davidson (1922–2001), American businessman
