= Police blog =

Blog written by police officers

Police blogs are a means for police officers from around the world to tell others about their work and way of life.

The authors often retain anonymity to avoid affecting their ongoing cases. Most police services also have rules on blogging activities that might bring the organisation into disrepute.

It is usual for police bloggers to adopt a pseudonym, such as PC David Copperfield. He is believed to have created the first UK blog of its type, extracts from which were published in the book Wasting Police Time. Subsequently, a further book, Diary of An On Call Girl has been published, based on the blog of PC Ellie Bloggs, and the book Perverting the Course of Justice based on the blog of Inspector Gadget.

Emergency Shorts complements its selection of other Emergency service blogs by collecting feeds from popular police blogs, including Crime and Justice which is a news-based police blog publishing press releases from all UK Police forces.

== Official blogs and new media ==
Recently, several police forces have been using new media channels to reach the public.
