= Egeli =

Egeli is a surname. Notable people with the surname include:

- Bjorn Egeli (1900–1984), Norwegian-born American painter
- Lene Egeli (born 1987), Norwegian beauty pageant contestant and model
- Peter Egeli (born 1934), American painter, son of Bjorn
