= Mark Lerner =

American businessman (born 1953)

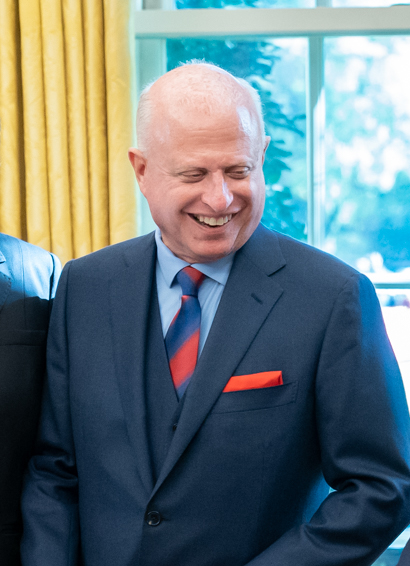
- Lerner in 2019
- Born: September 1953 (age 73)
- Education: B.B.A. George Washington University
- Occupations: Managing principal owner of Washington Nationals & Lerner Enterprises
- Spouse: Judy Lenkin
- Parent(s): Ted and Annette Lerner
- Awards: 2019 World Series Champion

Mark Lerner (born September 1953) is an American businessman who is the principal owner of Major League Baseball's (MLB) Washington Nationals and the managing owner of the real estate firm Lerner Enterprises.

== Early life ==
Lerner is the son of Annette and Ted Lerner. He graduated from the George Washington University School of Business with a BBA in 1975.

== Sports ownership ==
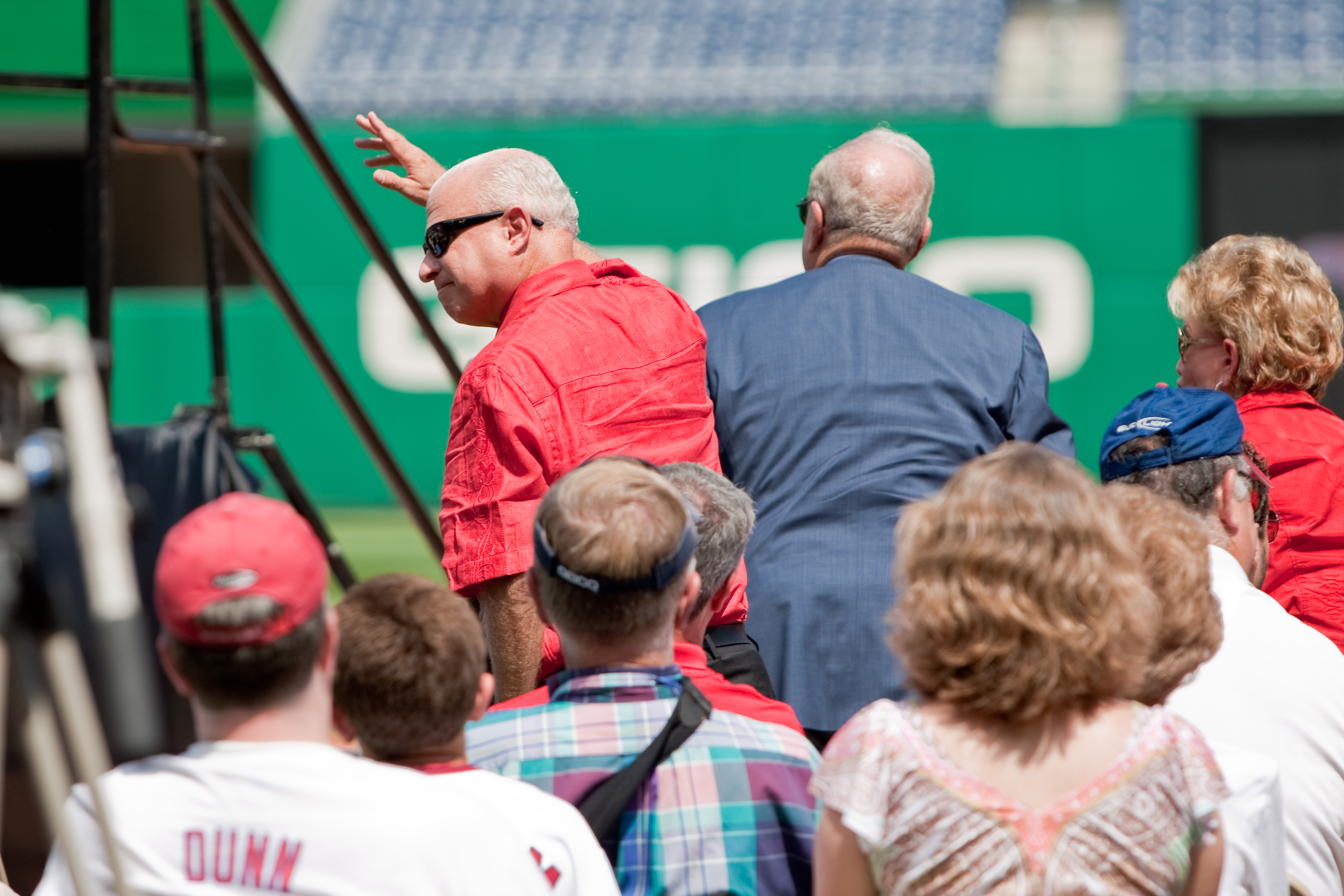
Lerner family stands when acknowledged (Mark is waving)

In 2006, Lerner's father purchased the Washington Nationals from MLB for $450 million. In 2018, his father retired and he stepped into the managing principal owner position.

== Personal life ==
He is married to Judy Lenkin. In January 2017, Lerner learned he had spindle cell sarcoma above his left knee. After wounds related to radiation did not heal properly, his left leg was amputated in April of the same year.

== Awards and honors ==
- 2019 World Series Champion (as owner of the Washington Nationals)
