= Howard C. Davidson =

American Army Air Forces general (1890–1984)

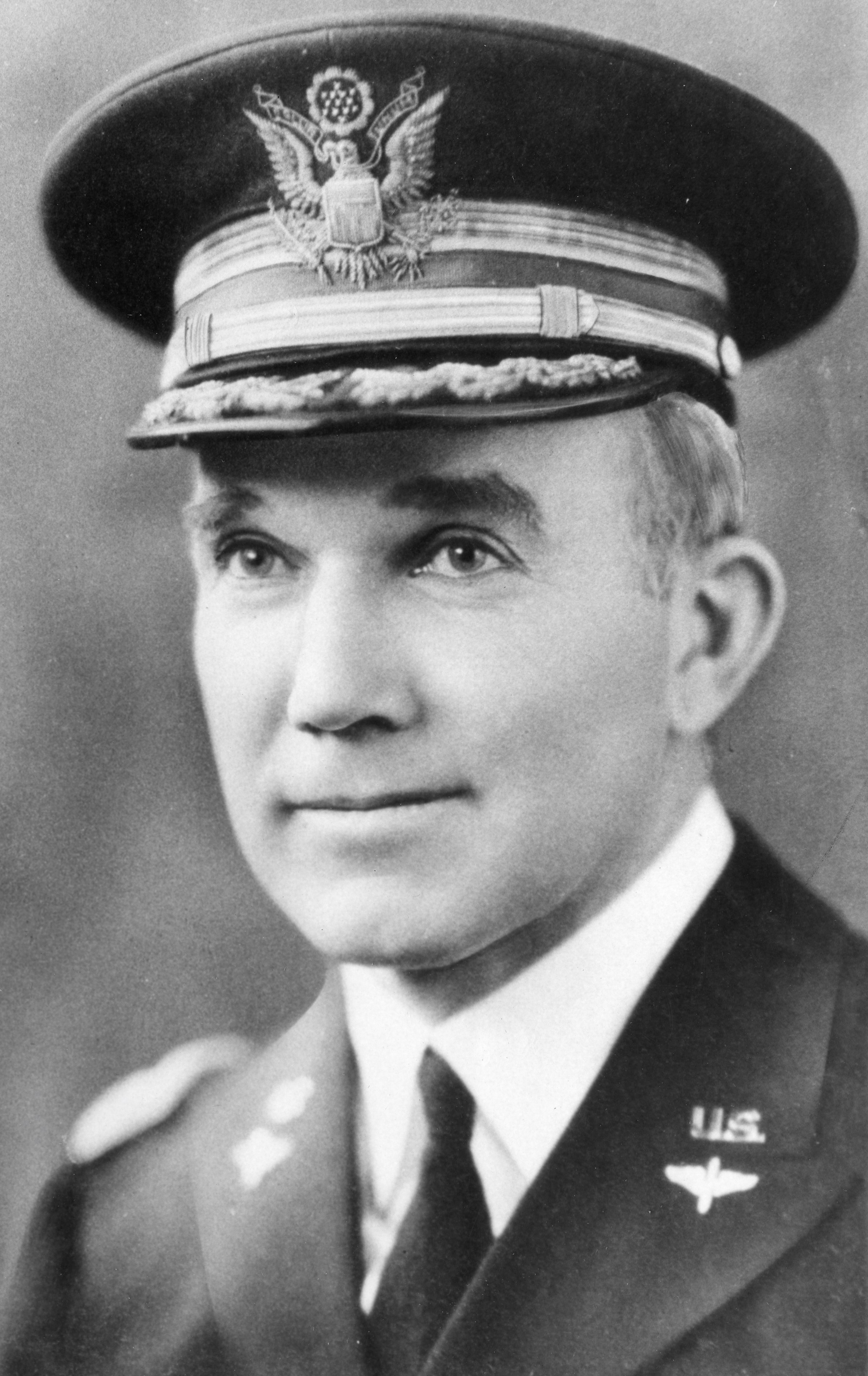
- Born: 15 September 1890; Wharton, Texas
- Died: 7 November 1984 (aged 94); Washington, D.C.
- Education: United States Military Academy
- Military career
- Allegiance: United States
- Branch: United States Army Air Forces
- Service years: 1913–1946
- Rank: Major General
- Nickname: Dave
- Commands: Tenth Air Force; VII Fighter Command; Seventh Air Force (Acting); Hawaiian Interceptor Command; 14th Pursuit Wing; Hickam Field; 19th Bombardment Group; Bolling Field; Mitchel Field (Acting); Corps Air Service, VII Army Corps
- Conflicts: Mexican Border War; World War I; World War II
- Awards: Distinguished Service Medal; Distinguished Flying Cross; Bronze Star Medal; Purple Heart; Air Medal

Howard Calhoun Davidson (15 September 1890 – 7 November 1984) was a United States Army Air Forces major general. On 7 December 1941, he was the commander of all Army Air Corps fighter aircraft in Hawaii. Davidson suffered the loss of more than half of his planes during the Japanese attack, but went on to command the Tenth Air Force in India, Burma and China from 1943 to 1945.

== Early life and education ==
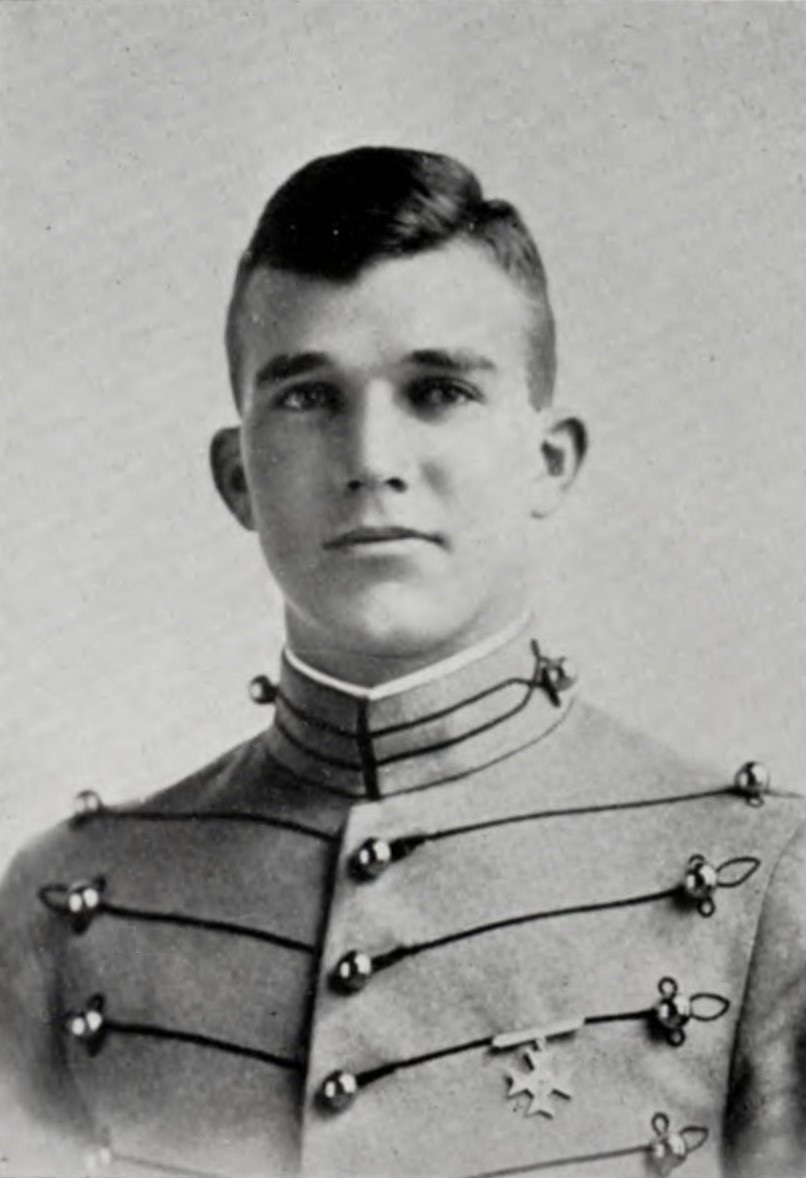
At West Point in 1913

Born and raised in Wharton, Texas, Davidson enrolled at the A&M College of Texas in 1907 but left to enter the United States Military Academy in March 1909. He graduated in June 1913 and was commissioned as a second lieutenant in the infantry. From January to September 1916, Davidson attended the Signal Corps Aviation School in San Diego, California. After World War I, he attended Sorbonne University from April to July 1919.

Transferred to the Army Air Service in July 1920, Davidson graduated from the Air Service Engineering School in July 1922. He later graduated from the Air Corps Tactical School in July 1933, the Command and General Staff School in June 1935 and the Army War College in June 1940.

== Career ==
After graduation from the Military Academy, Davidson served with the 22nd Infantry in Texas and Arizona until July 1915. He next briefly served with the 24th Infantry in the Philippines until September 1915. Davidson was then reassigned to the 27th Infantry but detailed to the Aviation Section, Signal Corps.

Promoted to first lieutenant effective 1 July 1916, Davidson became a junior military aviator and joined the 1st Aero Squadron in New Mexico in September. While there, he flew air support for the Punitive Expedition into Mexico. Davidson then served with the 3rd Aero Squadron in Texas from March to May 1917.

In May 1917, Davidson was promoted to captain and became commandant of the U.S. School of Military Aeronautics at Cornell University. In October 1917, he sailed for France. Davidson served as personnel officer for the Air Service in Paris and later in Tours until February 1918. He then supervised flying at the Second Aviation Instruction Center in Tours until August 1918. After having received a temporary promotion to major in June 1918, Davidson was given command of the Corps Air Service, VII Army Corps from September 1918 to April 1919.

Returning to the United States and reverting to the rank of captain, Davidson was assigned to McCook Field in Dayton, Ohio from August 1919 to August 1922. He received a permanent promotion to major effective 1 July 1920. Davidson then served as the assistant military attaché for aviation in London, England from October 1922 to August 1926. From August 1926 to December 1927, he was operations officer at Mitchel Field, Long Island. Davidson briefly serving as base commander for several weeks until January 1928, when he became commanding officer of Bolling Field, District of Columbia until September 1932.

Promoted to lieutenant colonel effective 1 August 1935, Davidson commanded the 19th Bombardment Group at Rockwell Field, California until October 1935 and then at March Field, California until August 1936. From September 1936 to September 1939, he served as executive officer at Army Air Corps headquarters in Washington, D.C. Davidson received a temporary promotion to colonel effective 1 August 1939. From July 1940 to April 1941, he was commanding officer of Hickam Field, Hawaii.

Receiving a temporary promotion to brigadier general on 7 April 1941, Davidson became commanding general of the 14th Pursuit Wing at Wheeler Field, Hawaii. In July, his fighter aircraft forces were redesignated as Hawaiian Interceptor Command. As tensions with Japan continued to build, he established a radar-based air warning network on Oahu. Parked out in the open to more easily guard against sabotage, more than half of his aircraft were destroyed on the ground on 7 December while Davidson and his men worked franticly to push the undamaged ones to safety. He received the Purple Heart with merit and, in 1960, the Bronze Star Medal.

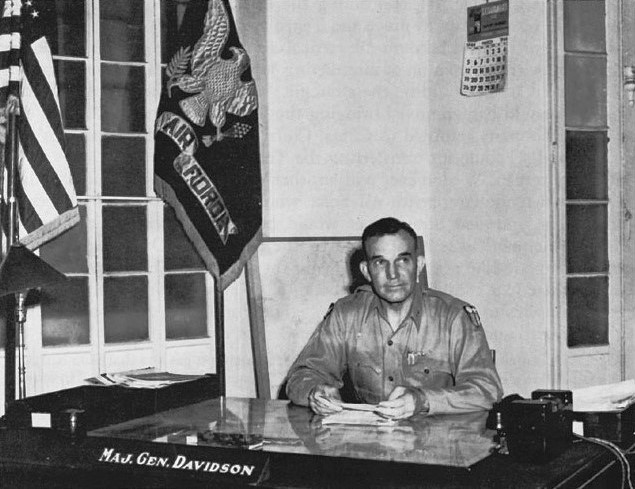
As commanding general of the Tenth Air Force

Rebuilding Pacific air forces after the Japanese attack, Davidson temporarily served as commander of the new Seventh Air Force. He then served as commanding general of VII Fighter Command until November 1942. His permanent rank was increased to colonel effective 1 July 1942. After a brief time back on the United States mainland, Davidson was sent to China in May 1943. He assumed command of the Tenth Air Force in India at the end of July. Davidson received a temporary promotion to major general on 13 January 1944 and moved his headquarters to Burma in February to better support Gen. Joseph Stilwell's forces there. He relinquished command in China on 20 August 1945.

For his service as Tenth Air Force commanding general, Davidson received the Distinguished Service Medal, the Distinguished Flying Cross and the Air Medal. The citation for his Distinguished Service Medal reads:

The President of the United States of America, authorized by Act of Congress July 9, 1918, takes pleasure in presenting the Army Distinguished Service Medal to Major General Howard Calhoun Davidson (ASN: 0-3596), United States Army Air Forces, for exceptionally meritorious and distinguished services to the Government of the United States, in a duty of great responsibility as Commanding General of the TENTH Air Force in the China-Burma-India Theater of Operations from June 1944 to March 1945. The singularly distinctive accomplishments of General Davidson culminate a long and distinguished career in the service of his country and his dedicated contributions reflect the highest credit upon himself and the United States Army Air Forces.

He was made an honorary commander of the Order of the British Empire by the United Kingdom and awarded the Order of the Cloud and Banner by China. On 21 April 1946, Davidson was conferred an honorary LL.D. degree by Texas A&M. He retired from active duty as a major general on 30 June 1946.

== Family and later life ==
Davidson was the son of Dr. John Calhoun Davidson and his wife Lily (Carleton) Davidson.

On 8 October 1921, Davidson married Mary Perrine Patterson, a daughter of Frank Patterson, co-founder of the National Cash Register Company. They had a son and three daughters. On 10 August 1950, his wife died in a fall from a fifth-story window of the Union Memorial Hospital in Baltimore after having suffered a stroke at the age of fifty-five. Their son Stuart Carleton Davidson later became a successful founder and restaurateur in the Washington DC area of Clyde's Restaurant Group.

After his retirement from active duty, Davidson lived in Washington, D.C. He served as the first director of the Air Force Aid Society from 1947 to 1966. After the creation of the United States Air Force, his entry on the retired list was transferred from the Army to the Air Force.

In 1958, Davidson married Mrs. Eva Cutts (Rucker) Finn (6 June 1894 – 24 August 1974). She was the widow of Army Air Corps officer 1st Lt. Matthew E. Finn (16 June 1897 – 21 November 1927), who had been killed in an accidental airplane crash in the Philippines. Davidson and his wife lived in Bethesda, Maryland.

Davidson underwent hip surgery at the age of ninety-four and later died from the resulting complications at the Walter Reed Army Medical Center in Washington, D.C. on 7 November 1984. At the time of his death, he had sixteen grandchildren and several great-grandchildren. On 13 November 1984, Davidson was buried next to his second wife at Arlington National Cemetery.

== Legacy ==
Davidson was portrayed by actor Edward Sheehan in the 1970 epic docudrama Tora! Tora! Tora!.

== See also ==
- Women's Air Raid Defense
- Cremona Farm

Military offices
Preceded by Clayton L. Bissell	Commanding General, Tenth Air Force; July 1943 – August 1945	Succeeded by Albert F. Hegenberger
