= Women's Air Raid Defense =

World War II Hawaiian civilian organization

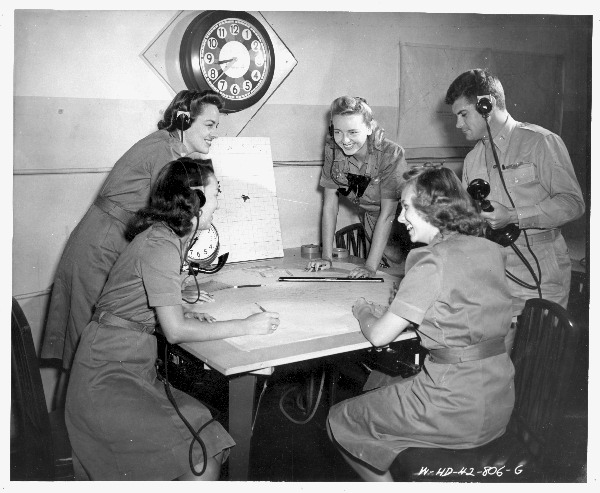
Women from WARD share a laugh.

Women's Air Raid Defense (WARD) was a World War II civilian organization that worked with the military to provide air defense for Hawaii. It formed in December 1941 after the attack on Pearl Harbor. Women volunteered in order to allow men to be freed from air defense work to go onto combat roles. WARD was the only civilian organization employed by the military for the purpose to replace men in active duty. It was disbanded after the end of WWII.

== History ==
Several days after the attack on Pearl Harbor on December 7, 1941, Una Walker, a military spouse, was called by Army Air Corps Brig. Gen. Howard C. Davidson, who commanded a wing at Wheeler Field. He asked her to assemble "a list of twenty bright, reliable women to be the nucleus of a secretive Army job". Walker and her husband Sandy compiled a list, which formed the initial roster of the WARD. Davidson, Walker and Mrs. John Howard, another military spouse, met the recruits at the Royal Hawaiian Hotel in Waikiki on December 26, the day after Admiral Nimitz's arrival. The WARD would "relieve urgently needed men for combat duty" and allow the women to operate the air defense center. There was a call for 100 women and all slots were filled. At first the women involved came from Hawaii, but later, women from the "mainland" were brought in.

Recruits for WARD were required to be between the ages of 20 and 34, without children and had to pass an Army intelligence test. Training classes were held at Iolani Palace and first started on January 1, 1942. WARDs would have two weeks of training before starting. WARD volunteers learned how to plot the positions of airplanes using radar, which was experimental at the time. After training, WARD started to work in shifts at Fort Shafter, staffing the air defense center 24 hours a day. Each WARD would work a six hour shift on and six off for eight days, after which they had 32 hours off. WARD recruits would plot the position of the aircraft on a large, gridded physical map of the Hawaiian Islands. WARD also worked with army officers who knew the locations of friendly aircraft and helped find lost planes. All of the women plotters were known by the code name, "Rascal" and the radar operator was coded "Oscar."

The organization was part of the 7th Fighter Wing, considered a detachment of Company A, Signal Aircraft Warning Regiment. Executive Order #9063 gave the organization powers to recruit and consider the volunteers civil servants for the federal government. WARD chief supervisors were under the command of Brigadier General Robert W. Douglas, Jr. The first chief supervisor of WARD was Mrs. R. T. Williams. She was followed by Catherine Coonley. Quarters were provided to the WARDs on Fort Shafter and the women moved into them on February 1, 1942. During the war, there were around 500 WARDs. They contracted to work a year at a time and were paid between $140 and $225 a month.

Other WARDs were established throughout the islands: Maui on July 30, 1942; Hilo on August 10, 1942 and Kauai on September 14, 1942.

WARD was detached from the Signal Corps on June 13, 1943 and named the WARD unit of the 17th Fighter Command.

WARD was disbanded in 1945, after the end of World War II. Some members of the group stayed on in civil service roles in Hawaii. Official records documenting the work of the WARDs was lost in a 1983 fire. A book by Kam Napier and Candace Chenowith, Shuffleboard Pilots, documents the history of the organization and was based on the personal experience of women who worked as WARDs.
