= Ted Lerner =

American businessman (1925–2023)

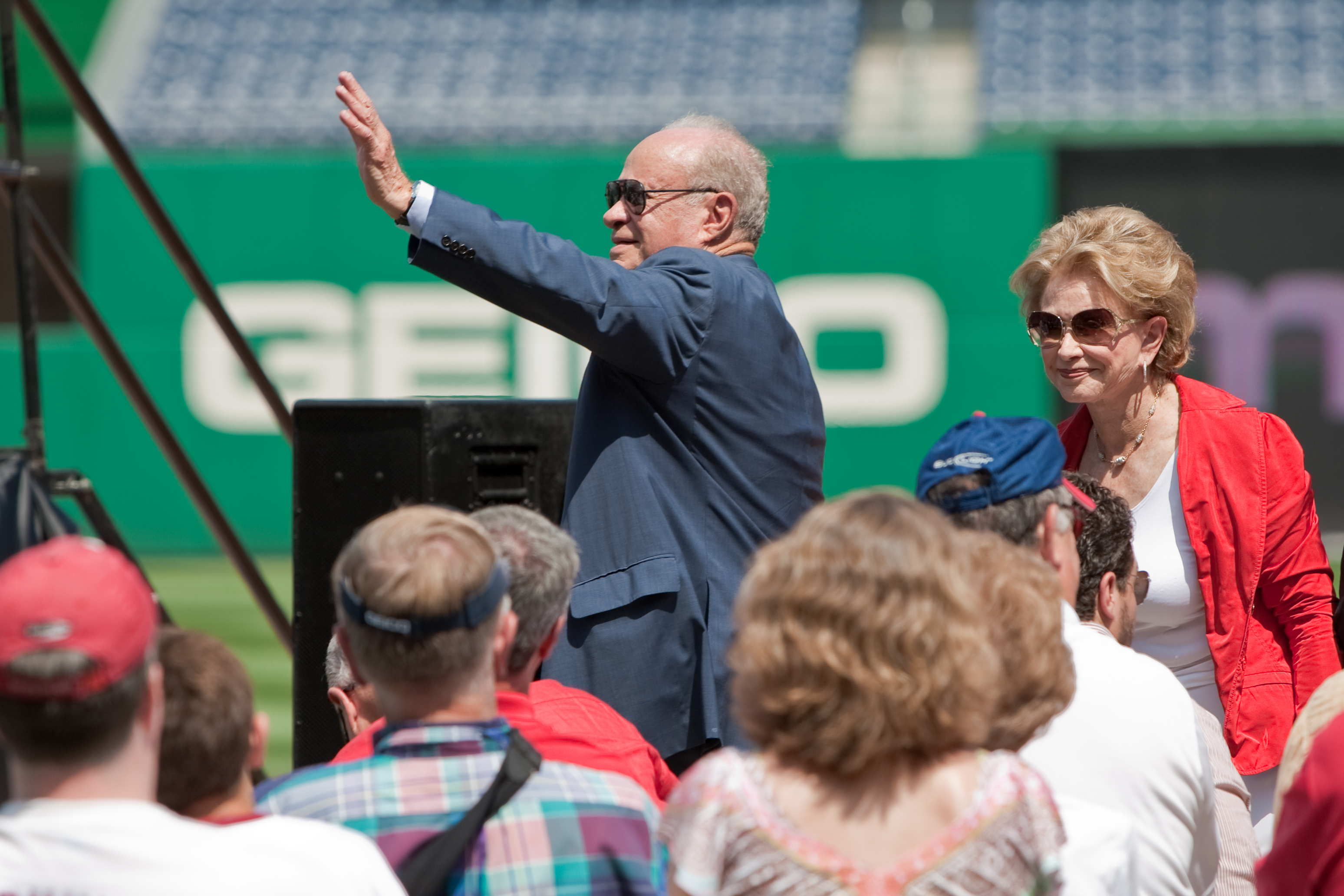
- Lerner in 2009, Washington, D.C.
- Born: Theodore Nathan Lerner; October 15, 1925; Washington, D.C., U.S.
- Died: February 12, 2023 (aged 97); Chevy Chase, Maryland, U.S.
- Education: George Washington University (AA, LLB)
- Occupations: Former managing principal owner of the Washington Nationals and Lerner Enterprises
- Spouse: Annette Lerner (m. 1951)
- Children: 3, including Mark
- Military career
- Branch: United States Army
- Service years: 1944–1946
- Conflicts: World War II

Theodore Nathan Lerner (October 15, 1925 – February 12, 2023) was an American real estate developer and managing principal owner of the Washington Nationals in Major League Baseball (MLB). He was the founder of Lerner Enterprises, the largest private landowner in the Washington metropolitan area, which owns commercial, retail, residential, and hotel properties, as well as Chelsea Piers in New York City. In 2022, with a net worth of $6.4 billion, he was tied for the richest resident of Maryland.

== Early life and education ==
Lerner was raised in an Orthodox Jewish family in Northwest Washington D.C., the eldest of three children born to Mayer, a 1921 emigrant from British Mandatory Palestine (modern day Israel), and Ethel, who immigrated from Lithuania. He attended Raymond Elementary School, MacFarland Junior High, and graduated from Roosevelt High School in 1944.

As a teenager, Lerner sold newspapers, using the proceeds to attend baseball games. He was an usher during the 1937 Major League Baseball All-Star Game.

Lerner served with the U.S. Army as a typist during the latter part of World War II, where he was stationed at Fort Hood in Waco, Texas. Using the G.I. Bill, he attended George Washington University, where he received an Associate of Arts in 1948 and then an L.L.B. from the George Washington University Law School in 1950. While in law school, he sold homes on the weekends, which piqued his interest in real estate.

== Career ==
In 1952, at age 26, Lerner borrowed $250 from his wife and founded Lerner Enterprises, a real estate development company, in Rockville, Maryland.

In the late 1950s, he developed Wheaton Plaza in partnership with Isadore Gudelsky. In 1968, he developed Tysons Corner Center on land that had in the recent past featured apple orchards and cow pastures.

He developed 22,000 homes and 6,000 apartments, along with numerous office buildings as well as Chelsea Piers, Tysons II, and Dulles Town Center.

=== Washington Nationals ===
The Washington Nationals franchise (then known as the Montreal Expos) was owned and operated by Major League Baseball from February 15, 2002. In 2006, Bud Selig chose Lerner and his family as the buyer of the team, for which he paid $450 million; the official transfer of ownership to Lerner occurred on July 24, 2006.

The Lerner family is the majority owner of the franchise, controlling over 90% of the shares. Lerner retired as managing principal owner in 2018, ceding the role to his son, Mark Lerner. Under Lerner's ownership, the Nationals won four National League East division championships and appeared in the postseason five times. Lerner won a World Series ring when the Nationals defeated the Houston Astros in the 2019 World Series.

He was also a partner in Monumental Sports & Entertainment, which owns the Washington Capitals of the National Hockey League, the Washington Mystics of the Women's National Basketball Association, the Washington Wizards of the National Basketball Association, and Capital One Arena.

== Philanthropy and accolades ==
The Annette M. and Theodore N. Lerner Family Foundation provides support to many organizations, including: Food & Friends; The Hebrew University of Jerusalem; Shady Grove Adventist Hospital; Hadley's Park; the Weizmann Institute of Science; the Scleroderma Foundation of Greater Washington; YouthAids; Junior Achievement of the Greater Washington Area; the Charles E. Smith Jewish Day School; and the Jewish Community Center of Greater Washington, among many others. Ted and his wife Annette are founding members of the United States Holocaust Memorial Museum in Washington, D.C.

The campus of the Charles E. Smith Jewish Day School in Rockville is named in his and his wife's honor after a multimillion-dollar donation to the school. The lunch room in the Melvin J. Berman Hebrew Academy was donated by the Lerner Family. The family has also donated the Lerner Family Health and Wellness Center and Theodore Lerner Hall at George Washington University in Washington, D.C. along with the Lerner Center at Hebrew University in Israel. The family donated the theater at Imagination Stage in Bethesda, Maryland.

Notable achievements include:

- 1990 American Academy of Achievement's Golden Plate Award of Excellence
- Elected to the Washington Business Hall of Fame by Junior Achievement of the National Capital Area in 2003
- Elected to the Jewish Community Center of Greater Washington Sports Hall of Fame in 2007
- Elected to the Washington DC Sports Hall of Fame in 2015
- Inducted into the Ring of Honor at Nationals Park in 2023

== Personal life and death ==
Lerner accepted few of the awards he was offered and made few public appearances, preferring to remain relatively anonymous.

On June 17, 1951, he married Annette M. Lerner. They had three children: Mark D. Lerner (married to Judy Lenkin Lerner), Debra Lerner Cohen (married to Edward L. Cohen) and Marla Lerner Tanenbaum (married to Robert K. Tanenbaum). Ted Lerner had nine grandchildren and 11 great-grandchildren.

Lerner contributed to the campaigns of Al Gore, Steny Hoyer, and Dianne Feinstein.

Lerner died from pneumonia at his home in Chevy Chase, Maryland, on February 12, 2023, at age 97.
