= Old Ebbitt Grill =

Historic bar and restaurant in Washington, D.C.

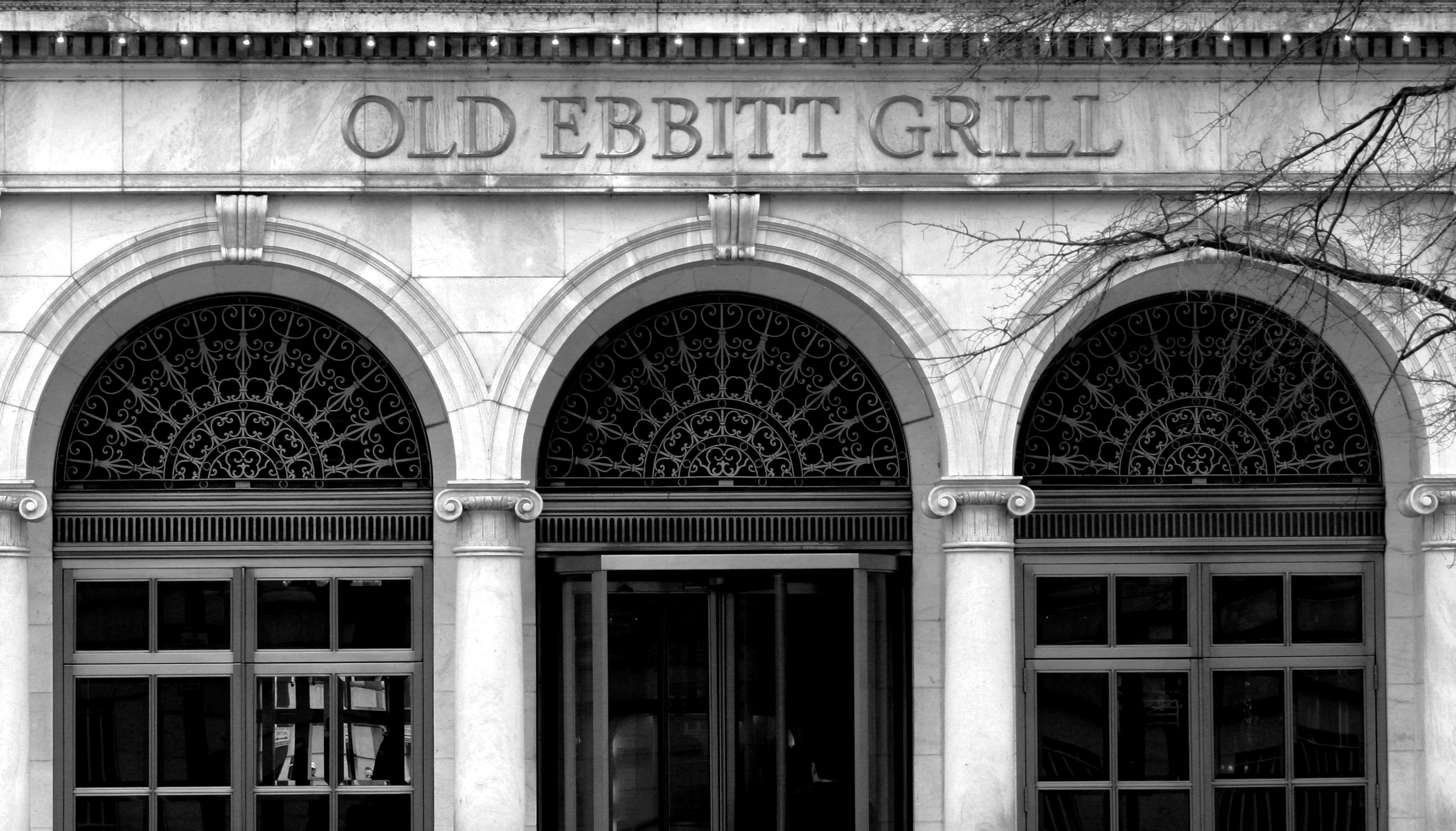
- Old Ebbitt Grill from 15th Street.
- Interactive map of Old Ebbitt Grill

Restaurant information
- Established: 1856
- Owners: Clyde's Restaurant Group, subsidiary of Graham Holdings
- Head chef: Joseph Allen
- Food type: American
- Dress code: Casual
- Location: 675 15th Street NW, Washington, D.C., 20005, United States
- Seating capacity: 398
- Reservations: Suggested
- Website: www.ebbitt.com

Old Ebbitt Grill is a historic bar and restaurant located at 675 15th Street NW in Washington, D.C., in the United States. It is Washington's oldest bar and restaurant, and is owned by Clyde's Restaurant Group. It first opened as an unnamed restaurant in the Ebbitt House Hotel. The Hotel distinguished itself as the first hotel in Washington to remain open all summer instead of closing when Congress adjourned.

In 1827, the Hotel was razed and rebuilt in the same location. Ebbitt House Hotel was razed in 1925 to make way for the National Press Building, built in 1926. The restaurant was incorporated by Anders Lofstrand, Sr., as a stand-alone business. It moved into new quarters at 1427 F Street NW. After Lofstrand's death in 1955, the restaurant was purchased by Peter Bechas in 1961. The restaurant was sold at a tax sale in June 1970, and was purchased by Clyde's Restaurant Group. The 1427 F Street NW location was demolished in 1983 during redevelopment, and Old Ebbitt Grill moved into its current quarters at 675 15th Street NW.

For many years as part of Ebbitt House, the bar/restaurant had no stand-alone name or identity. In November 1910, it began using the name "New Ebbitt Café" . In 1926, after the restaurant became incorporated as a stand-alone business, it was known as both "Ebbitt's Grill" and "Old Ebbitt Grill". Over time, only the "Old Ebbitt Grill" name was used. It retained that name after its ownership changes in 1961 and 1970.

Since 1970, because of its popularity Old Ebbitt Grill has been frequented by numerous politicians, some known for scandals and maneuvering. It has also been the site of parties hosted by famous actors and singers. For many years, it has been the restaurant with one of the highest amount of sales in the United States. In 1995, Old Ebbitt Grill created a popular annual event known as the Oyster Riot.

== Ebbitt House: 1856 to 1925 ==
=== First Ebbitt House ===
The building which later was owned by William E. Ebbitt was located on the southeast corner of F Street NW and 14th Street NW in the city of Washington, D.C. In June 1798, William Crawford obtained title to four parcels of land on the southeast corner of 14th and F streets. The four parcels lay west-to-east along 14th Street. In 1800, Crawford built two four-story Federal-style houses on the two easternmost parcels of this property. The garden of the houses extended west onto the two empty lots on the corner, and down the hill in the rear almost to Pennsylvania Avenue.

In 1833, Bushrod W. Reed relocated to the District of Columbia from Westmoreland County, Virginia, purchased the two easternmost lots from Crawford, and between 1833 and 1836 built a double-wide, four-story, Federal-style building on the corner next to the Crawford homes. Crawford's daughter, Sarah, married Richard Forrest, one of the first eight clerks appointed in 1801 by Thomas Jefferson in the United States Department of State. William Crawford installed Richard and Sarah Forrest in his houses, and they inherited them upon his death. Richard Forrest died in 1828, and Sarah died in 1832. Although it is unclear what happened to the property after Sarah Crawford's death, some time prior to 1856 it was purchased by William J. Smith. Smith joined the two houses into a single unit, and named them "Frenchman's Hotel" because he employed a French immigrant as the manager of the facility.

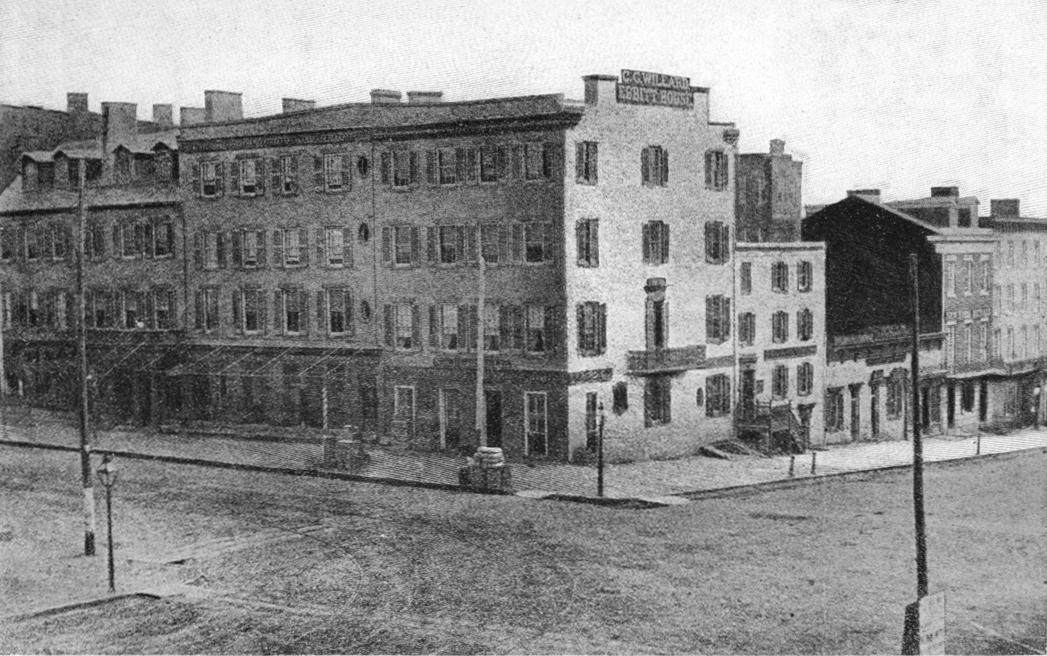
Ebbitt House in 1865, after the Reed and Ebbitt properties were joined

In 1856, William E. Ebbitt purchased Frenchman's Hotel from Smith, turned it into a boarding house, and renamed it Ebbitt House. During this time, the boarding house also took in guests from the Willard Hotel. On September 1, 1863, Ebbitt sold the boarding house to his son-in-law, Albert H. Craney. Exactly a year later, Craney sold the property to Caleb C. Willard, brother of Willard Hotel owner Henry A. Willard. Willard converted the boarding house into a hotel. The same year, Willard purchased Bushrod Reed's property as well. He joined the Ebbitt and Reed properties into a single unit enclosing a 4-foot (1.2 m) wide alley between the two and built bathrooms with oval windows in the space above.

A three-story house on 14th Street adjacent to Ebbitt House was occupied by the Reed family as well, although by 1864 it had been purchased by Willard, who raised the roof. At that time it was not yet part of the hotel; Willard leased the building to the New York Times for use as office space. Two single-story buildings south of the Reed home were also built and owned by Reed. By 1865, they were used as offices by The Philadelphia Inquirer, New York Evening Post, and other newspapers. Next to the one-story buildings was Farnham House. It was originally owned and built by David Burnes, whose plantation had covered much of the downtown area that would be developed as Washington, D.C. Burnes gave Farnham House to his daughter Marcia, who in turn sold it to William H. Dorsey in 1802. On May 16, 1818, Dorsey sold the house to William Blanchard. Blanchard's daughter, Jane Farnham, inherited the property on June 10, 1850, after his death. By 1865, it housed the D.C. offices of the New York Herald. Given the numerous newspapers with offices along 14th Street between E and F Streets, the area was nicknamed "Newspaper Row," a name it would hold into the 1930s. Farnham sold her house at auction to Caleb Willard on October 4, 1866, for $74,000.

For many years prior to the construction of the Ebbitt House stables in 1872, a large house known as Bull's Head stood at the rear of the hotel. The house marked the northeast corner of Murder Bay. Bull's Head housed prostitutes and contained a large, lower-class gambling den.

=== Second Ebbitt House ===
In 1872, Willard razed Ebbitt House, doubled its size, and built a six-story, Second Empire-style hotel with a mansard roof. The hotel had 300 rooms, canopied windows, and an elevator. The dining room was two stories high, with floor to ceiling windows, white marble floor, white painted walls, and a fresco on the ceiling. The dining room was in the rear of the hotel, on the site of what used to be Farnham House, which in photographs from the period shows as the last three windows on 14th Street. The massive chandeliers led the dining room to be called "the Crystal Room." The paneled bar was reached by passing through the lobby and down a flight of stairs into the basement.

In the late 1800s, this hotel was considered one of the most fashionable in the city; its lodgings and restaurant were patronized by politicians and high-ranking military officers. Major General Winfield Scott Hancock, Commanding General of the United States Army William Tecumseh Sherman, and Rear Admiral Samuel Rhoads Franklin all lived there for a time. It is well-documented that President Ulysses S. Grant and President Andrew Johnson both dined in the restaurant frequently, as did abolitionist clergyman Henry Ward Beecher.

From 1877 to 1890, future president William McKinley and his wife lived there, during his entire congressional career. He dined almost nightly with his wife in the restaurant. His close friend, Representative and later President James A. Garfield, visited McKinley often in the hotel. McKinley departed from the hotel for his presidential inaugural.

Presidents Grover Cleveland, Theodore Roosevelt, and Warren G. Harding all drank in the bar there. Chief Justice of the United States Salmon P. Chase lived there while working in the capital and died there in October 1886. Rear Admiral John Lee Davis also lived and died there. William Howard Taft lived there from 1890 to 1892 when he was United States Solicitor General.

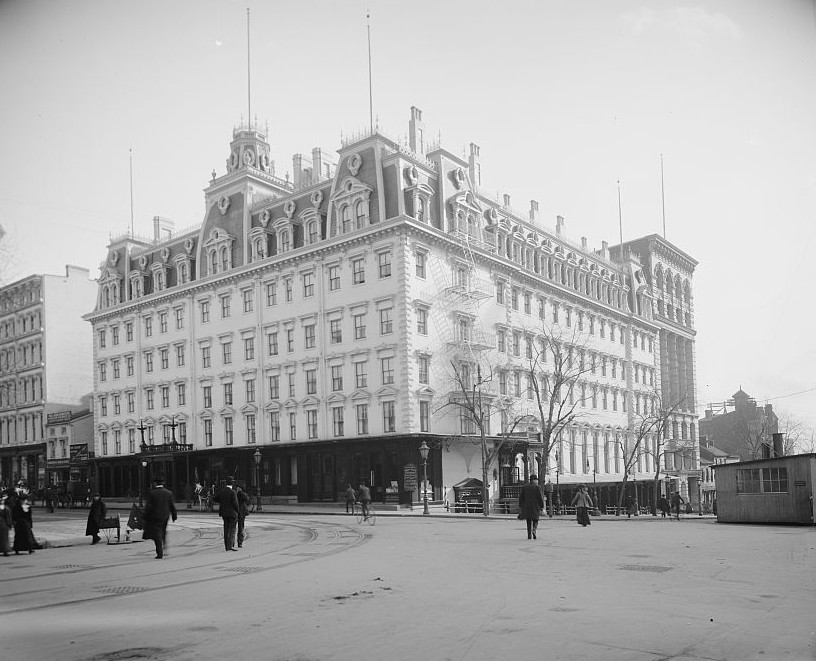
Ebbitt House in 1903. The first two stories of the building in the rear constituted the restaurant.

Ebbitt House struggled to compete against the larger and more lavish Willard Hotel, and the Raleigh Hotel, built in 1893. From the late 1860s until the 1910s, it was considered "Army and Navy Headquarters" because of the number of military personnel who lived there and the large number of veterans' meetings held there. In November 1889, Caleb Willard hired Henry C. Burch and Charles E. Gibbs, both veteran hotel managers in the city, to run Ebbitt House. Over the next two years, Burch and Gibbs completely refurnished all the rooms, adding new furniture and Belgian carpets, re-papered or added painted frescoes to the ceilings, and installed new furniture in the hallways. On the east side was the now-famous Red Parlor, a gentleman's lounge fitted with rich red and gold draperies, fabric wall coverings, and upholstered furniture. The restaurant, called "cheerful and sunny" by the Washington Post, fronted onto 14th Street NW, was lit with crystal chandeliers, and could seat up to 225 people. It was completely remodeled by Burch and Gibbs. Guests dined at tables set with tablecloths imported from Scotland, using Haviland & Co. Limoges porcelain china, silver-handled knives and forks manufactured by Reed & Barton, and Bohemian glassware. Cut-glass flower vases, finger bowls, and water bottles were used for serving. Diners sat in high-backed leather chairs. At breakfast, the waiters wore brown cutaway jackets, vests, and pants with a gold stripe, while in the evening they changed into black tuxedos. The kitchen was renovated. New steam tables and massive coffee urns manufactured by Brambull, Deane & Co. of New York City were installed. The menu — served buffet-style — included Blue Point oysters, green sea turtle, Kennebec River salmon, mutton, chicken, hominy fritters, stewed diamondback terrapin, canvasback duck, English pheasant, and a variety of vegetables, fruits, cheese, crackers, nuts, pies, and puddings. Wines, whiskeys, and brandies were served from two large storerooms. Despite the success of the changes, Gibbs left Ebbitt House in 1893 after purchasing Wormley's Hotel. Burch became the sole manager of the hotel. He conducted extensive renovations to the exterior of the hotel in 1895. An enormous two-story mansard roof, with central and corner pavilions influenced by the French Beaux-Arts movement, was added to the top floor, replacing the original single-story, restrained mansard roof.

Ebbitt House slowly declined. In 1907, John Helmus, who oversaw the serving staff and bar for 39 years, died. Caleb Willard, now one of the most famous and wealthiest men in Washington, D.C., died on August 2, 1905. H.C. Burch died the following year. Willard's estate rented Ebbitt House to George R. Shutt, who had formerly managed the National Hotel at 6th Street and Pennsylvania Avenue NW. Shutt said it was his intention to move all the stores occupying the 14th Street side of the building to the south side, and to add a large café in its place. He also planned to add a women-only restaurant to the lobby, at a time when many public facilities excluded women. Lucy Parker Willard, widow of Caleb Willard, died on January 12, 1910.

Shutt took over management of the hotel on May 16, 1910. Shutt's plans had changed somewhat in the intervening nine months. He decided to devote the whole 14th Street side to the restaurant, as well as to renovate the kitchen. A new head chef and assistant chefs had already been hired. The women's café was moved into the basement, where it occupied a portion of the old restaurant. The office space was enlarged. The restrooms were moved into the basement so they could be enlarged with lounges. An air conditioning plant was installed, elevators replaced, sleeping rooms enlarged, and bathrooms added to all sleeping rooms. What was known as the "New Ebbitt Café" opened in November 1910. It was widely considered the most luxurious restaurant in the city when it opened. The floors were colorful mosaic tiles, the furnishings were expensive, and the café profusely decorated with palms and ferns.

=== Razing of the second Ebbitt House ===
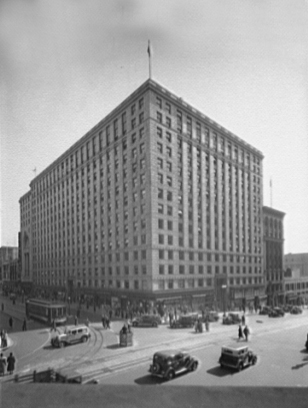
Ebbitt House was razed to construct the National Press Building (depicted).

The hotel continued to decline. A fire broke out in the kitchen on August 12, 1913, doing extensive damage. Two fire companies had to respond to the blaze, which did $5,000 worth of damage. Three months later, city officials accused Shutt of selling liquor in the bar to underage children. A jury could not reach agreement on the charges in December 1913, but the charges were not dismissed until September 1914.

The renovations were not enough. Shutt died in 1919, and his widow attempted to run the hotel. Mrs. Shutt eventually turned the hotel over to Augustus Gumpert. Prohibition began in the District of Columbia on November 1, 1917. The night before, Ebbitt Grill ran out of liquor by 10:45 P.M. While Prohibition lasted, Ebbitt Grill was known as part of "Rum Row"—former bars in an area bounded by 13th and 14th streets NW and E and F streets NW which continued to sell alcohol furtively.

In 1923, the Willard estate, which had retained ownership since Lucy Willard's death in 1910, decided to sell the hotel. The new owners refused to renew Gumpert's lease on a yearly basis. They insisted on a month-to-month lease, but Gumpert could not come to agreement with his vendors, who required a yearly lease to ensure a steady stream of income. Gumpert and the new owners both agreed the hotel should close.

Ebbitt House and its restaurant were razed in 1926 to make way for the National Press Club building. Ebbitt House closed to the public at noon on Friday, May 1, 1925, and the furnishings were auctioned off on Tuesday, May 5. By this time, the hotel was so run down that the furnishings often went for a fraction of their replacement value, most going for less than a dollar.

It was not clear if a new Ebbitt House hotel would be built. In July 1925, The Washington Post reported that Gumpert was constructing a new 10-story, 125-room Ebbitt House hotel at 10th and H Streets NW. The old hotel continued to stand, and rumors said the building would be turned into a department store or a movie theater. However, in November 1925, the owners announced that the building would be razed to make way for the National Press Club Building. Demolition of the building began at 1:00 P.M. on January 6, 1926, as National Press Club President Henry L. Sweinhart ceremoniously removed a brick from the existing building.

== Old Ebbitt Grill: 1926 to 1983 ==
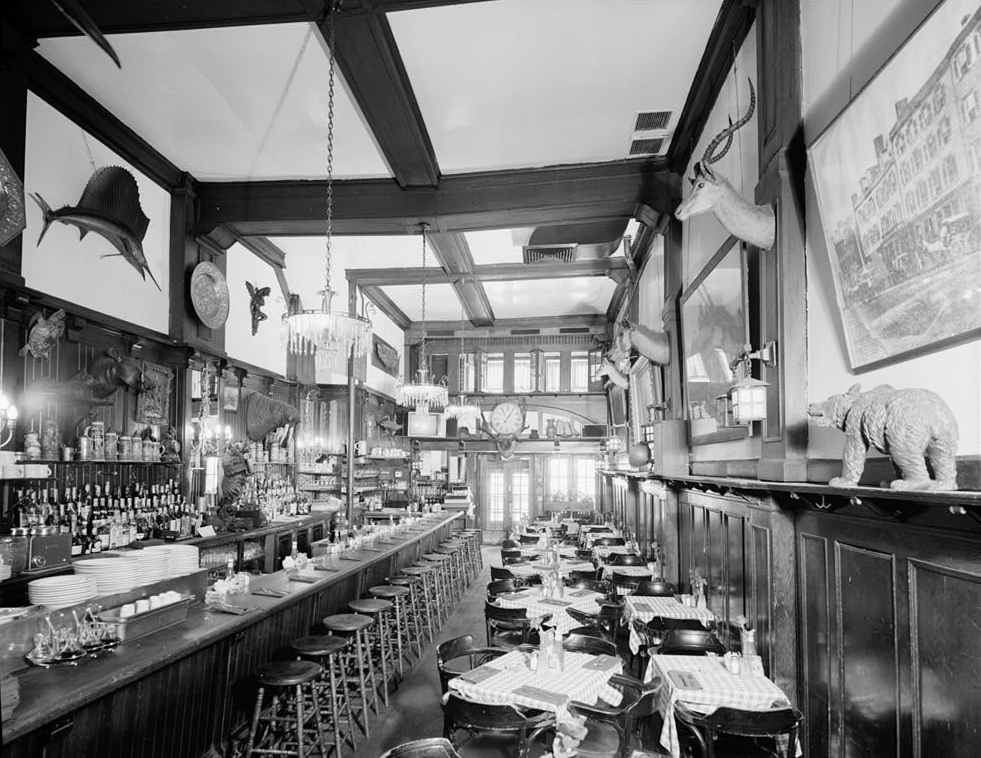
Looking south through the main bar of the Old Ebbitt Grill at 1427 F Street NW in 1967. Note the image hanging on the wall on the right, depicting the original 1856 Ebbitt House.

The history of the restaurant between its establishment in 1926 and the 1980s is not well documented. The media reported on Old Ebbitt Grill only a few times. For example, after the repeal of Prohibition in the United States, Ebbitt Grill sought a liquor license in May 1934.

=== Lofstrand years ===
The Ebbitt House bar, its paneling, and decorations were removed before the hotel's demolition and installed at a new location at 1427 F Street NW. The media reported the restaurant's name as "Ebbitt's Grill" and "Old Ebbitt Grill". Anders R. Lofstrand, Sr. was the proprietor. Lofstrand was a veteran bar and club entrepreneur in the city and in southern Maryland. He helped incorporate the Calvert Club, a private gentleman's drinking establishment dedicated to the memory of Leonard Calvert, 2nd Baron Baltimore in 1914. He and his wife, Elizabeth, later purchased Southlawn Farm, which is now a part of the city of Rockville, Maryland, in 1944, and in 1946 built a factory on it. His son, Anders R. Lofstrand, Jr., invented a machine to wash drinking glasses at Old Ebbitt Grill.

=== Bechas years ===
Anders Lofstrand, Sr. died in 1955, and in April 1961 Old Ebbitt Grill was sold to Peter Bechas, the former head waiter at the Willard Hotel from 1955 to 1958. Bechas' ownership of the restaurant was marred by repeated tax problems. Between April 1961 and April 1970, the restaurant paid its sales tax in only six of 105 months. Bechas was successfully prosecuted for failure to pay sales taxes in 1963 and 1966, and was prosecuted again in 1970. The business also failed to deposit withholding taxes on employee wages with the city.

The restaurant had little reputation by 1969, and was primarily known for its pork chops, seafood, and steaks, and as one of the few D.C. restaurants to serve dinner until 12:30 A.M. In July 1969, Old Ebbitt Grill was one of 171 firms in the city cited for non-payment of taxes. A tax claim was also filed by the federal government, and the business was unable to satisfy the claim. On June 5, 1970, Old Ebbitt Grill was closed by the Internal Revenue Service (IRS) for failure to pay $10,995.15 in taxes going back to 1965.

=== Purchase by Clyde's Restaurant Group ===
Old Ebbitt Grill was purchased on June 16, 1970, at a tax sale by Stuart C. Davidson and John Laytham, co-owners of the restaurant Clyde's of Georgetown. Clyde's was founded in 1963 by Davidson, then an investment banker, after new legislation made it legal to serve liquor to patrons standing at bars. Since 1917, the liquor law had required that alcohol only be consumed while sitting at tables. Davidson and Laytham bid in the tax sale hoping to buy beer steins and the mahogany bar, but ended up with the entire restaurant. The IRS offered the entire restaurant for sale after an auction of individual items failed to raise more than $6,639. The sale price was $11,250. Among the items they purchased were a 200-year-old clock which used carved wooden gears for its mechanism, a carved wooden grizzly bear once owned by Alexander Hamilton, crystal decanters dating to 1575, and stuffed boar's head, swordfish, alligator, and walrus head.

The new Old Ebbitt Grill improved its menu. It reopened at the same location on October 13, 1970. The mahogany bar was slightly lowered, new HVAC installed, and a general $130,000 refurbishment completed. Clyde's and Old Ebbitt Grill shared the same menus, which lowered costs and led to improved training for kitchen staff. In June 1974, a Washington Post food review declared Old Ebbitt's fare to be "American, plain, and not bad". By 1977, Washington Post food critic Donald Dresden was praising the restaurants bacon cheeseburgers and innovative menu items: "Imitators are still trying to top Clyde's and the Ebbitt's bacon cheeseburgers and the disc-shaped deep-fried potatoes that come with—but they'll have to keep trying still."

The new owners retained Old Ebbitt's dark paneling, shelves of beer steins, mounted game trophies, and spittoons, which it had long showcased. The decor was made more whimsical, however, leading Washington Post architectural critic Wolf Von Eckardt to declare in 1978 that the Grill was "one of the most charming rendezvous on the Eastern Seaboard". The restaurant featured bare, unpolished wood flooring throughout, with a fern bar on the second floor. Washington Post reporter Pamela Kessler said in 1981, "The restaurant feels like old Philadelphia, rather than a slicker, parvenu Washington".

Old Ebbitt Grill gained notoriety in 1977 as the location where a Soviet spy ring operated. In 1976, Vladimir I. Alekseyev, a reporter for the Soviet Union's news agency, TASS, contacted United States Information Agency employee Ronald L. Humphrey—who was already acting as a spy for the North Vietnamese government. Humphreys had already been identified by the Federal Bureau of Investigation (FBI) and was facing prosecution for his actions. Humphrey and his attorney told the FBI about the contact immediately, and Humphrey agreed to act as a double agent. Alekseyev and Humphrey met at Old Ebbitt Grill in December 1976. The United States expelled Alekseyev on February 6, 1977.

The restaurant continued to improve through the late 1970s and into the early 1980s. In 1978, it was one of the few establishments in Washington, D.C., to serve Guinness Stout on tap. In 1979, Washington Post restaurant reviewer Lon Tuck noted that Old Ebbitt's Omelet Room was one of the most famous locations in the city. Its trademark omelets were the "Old Ebbitt", made with sharp cheddar cheese and Bermuda onions, and another made with chili and served with a garden salad with Roquefort blue cheese dressing. Washington Post reporter Pamela Kessler observed in 1981 that its signature dishes included chili, blue cheese and Welsh rarebit hamburgers, quiche Lorraine, a Reuben sandwich, and steaks. Its crab cakes were poorly reviewed as too bland and heavy with bread. It was one of the few dining places in the city to stay open until 1:00 A.M.

=== Demolition of 1427 F Street ===
Old Ebbitt Grill was demolished in 1983 during redevelopment of the site.

The restaurant was first threatened with demolition in 1962. Around the corner from the restaurant on 15th Street NW and across the street from the U.S. Treasury Building stood the nearly block-long Keith-Albee Building designed by noted architect Jules Henri de Sibour and Rhodes' Tavern, the first polling place in the city, the first city town hall, and the place where citizens of the District of Columbia first petitioned Congress for the right to vote. Developer Morris Cafritz, who purchased the Keith-Albee Building and Rhodes' Tavern in 1956, wanted to tear down the entire half-block to construct a new office building.

He did not proceed at the time, but the threat of demolition was a catalyst to a committee of citizens known as the "Landmarks Committee" recommending in 1970 that the city enact legislation protecting the two structures and Old Ebbitt Grill. No legislation was enacted, however.

In 1977, developer Oliver T. Carr proposed tearing down the entire block between F and G streets NW and 14th and 15th streets NW and constructing a 12-story hotel and office building complex to be called Metropolitan Square. Demolition would include Old Ebbitt Grill and Rhodes' Tavern. Carr had already negotiated to move the Old Ebbitt Grill to a new location within the new structure. There was little opposition to the demolition of most of the block, which included the Old Ebbitt Grill site. A series of lawsuits, petitions, and intervention by city and federal officials occurred. As demolition proceeded, Old Ebbitt Grill hosted a large party which won notice in The Washington Post. Attendance was so large, the party spilled out into the street. Music was provided by Federal Jazz Commission, a traditional "classic" jazz band which made music indoors and out.

In February 1980, Carr agreed to preserve the facades of the Keith-Albee and National Metropolitan Bank buildings as part of the Metropolitan Square development. In August 1980, Carr announced that Old Ebbitt Grill would reopen in a corner location near to its old 1427 F Street NW spot. The restaurant said it would lease 13,492 square feet (1,253.4 m^{2}) of space on two levels, with the bar, main restaurant, and oyster bar on the main level. Old Ebbitt intended to close its doors in April 1983 and reopen a few weeks later in the new location in May.

The time frame for closure proved optimistic. Old Ebbitt Grill did not close its doors at 1427 F Street until September 12, 1983. 1427 F Street NW was demolished in early December 1983.

== Old Ebbitt Grill: 1984 to present ==
=== 1980s ===
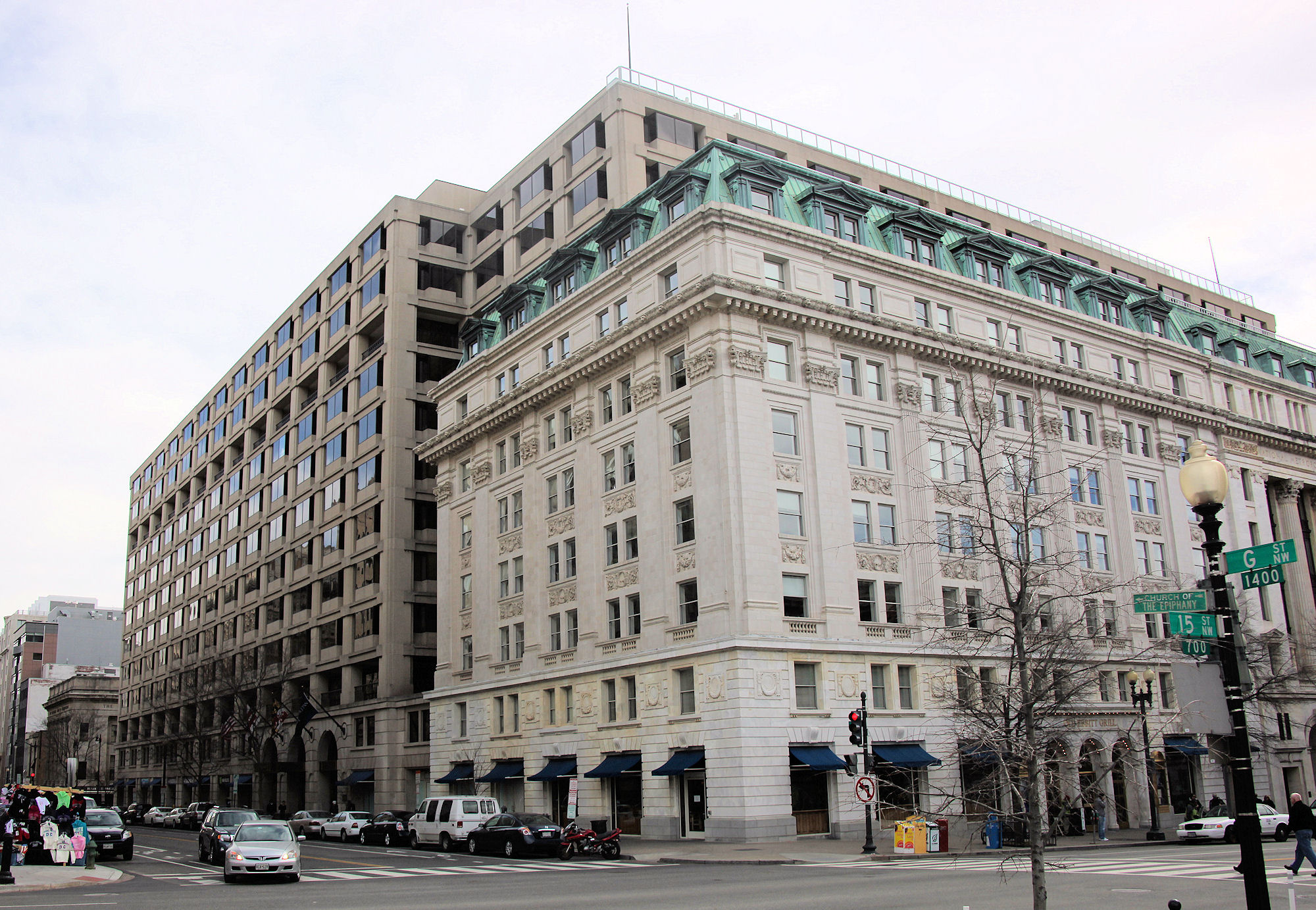
The northwest corner of Metropolitan Square, showing the Keith-Albee facade and the new structure built behind it. The blue awnings shade the windows of the Old Ebbitt Grill.

Old Ebbitt Grill reopened at 675 15th Street NW in early October 1983. Clyde's Restaurant Group spent $4.4 million constructing and outfitting the interior. The architectural firm of Andrews & Chatelain designed the interior. The interior decoration was designed to mimic the bar at 1427 F Street, and included the game trophies, some of which were originals, not recreations, and rumored to have been shot by President Theodore Roosevelt. Old Ebbitt's famous mahogany bar was not installed in the new location. A replica was crafted instead. The walls were paneled in mahogany and the ceilings decorated with murals and stencils. The restaurant had seating for 200 at tables and in booths. The booths had green leather seats and velvet-covered walls, and were separated from one another by etched glass dividers. The long bar still sported mounted game animal trophies overhead, the fixtures were of marble or brass, and the curtains of lace. An oyster bar was added to the rear of the restaurant on the main floor. The kitchen featured a special charcoal-burning grill, and the wine cellar featured a Cruvinet wine dispensing system. Gas lamps were used in the main bar and booth area. A year after the Grill opened, The Washington Post said it had the best dining ambience of any restaurant in the city.

The restaurant also instituted a "back waiter" system. Back waiters were trained to balance plates of food on their arms, so they could get them to tables faster without the need to load and unload trays. Back waiters were required to have excellent physical strength and good balance. The back waiter system was created so that waiters continued to wait on tables rather than spending time in the kitchen waiting for orders to be filled.

The Omelet Room did not make the transition to the new location. National health campaigns against high cholesterol had reduced demand for foods heavy in eggs. Instead, the basement contained a large private dining room.

The new restaurant was immediately popular. Washington Post food critic Phyllis Richman declared the restaurant's signature hamburger its best entree. She found the appetizers and salads excellent, but considered the pasta dishes hit-or-miss and disparaged the main entrees. Within a year, the restaurant was mostly being patronized by yuppies, lawyers, and tourists. A 1986 food review in The Washington Post concluded that Old Ebbitt Grill had the worst omelets and pancakes in the city, but the best appetizers. Its main claim to fame was its hefty portions and moderate prices.

Old Ebbitt Grill was the site of a discussion among administration officials hoping to protect President Reagan from fallout related to the Iran–Contra affair of 1986. Beginning in 1984, officials in the Reagan administration sought to sell conventional weapons to Iran via Israel in exchange for Iran using its influence to win the release of American hostages being held by Hezbollah and other terrorist groups in Lebanon, which was then in the throes of a civil war. In December 1985, Oliver North, a Lieutenant Colonel in the Marine Corps who was serving as a military aide to the National Security Council, proposed selling the weapons directly to Iran at a $15 million mark-up. He would use the excess funds to supply arms and supplies to the Contras. The Contras were guerrilla fighters opposed to the communist government of Nicaragua led by Daniel Ortega. The United States was barred by the Boland Amendment from supporting the Contras.

The Iran-Contra affair was exposed by the press on November 3, 1986, and on November 13, President Reagan publicly admitted that an arms-for-hostages deal existed. However, the diversion of funds to the Contras was not yet exposed. On November 22, Assistant Attorney General William Bradford Reynolds discovered an April 1986 draft memo from North to National Security Advisor John Poindexter, who was at the time also serving as a Vice Admiral in the United States Navy, which suggested that $12 million in Iranian weapons sales be used to help the Contras. Reynolds discovered the document in North's files during a meeting with North in his White House office. Reynolds smuggled the document out of North's office and took it to a luncheon meeting at Old Ebbitt with Attorney General Edwin Meese. When shown the document, Meese allegedly said, "Oh, darn." Assistant Attorney General Charles J. Cooper, a young appointee in the Office of Legal Counsel, also at the lunch, said the memo was a "bomb."

In the late 1980s, Old Ebbitt Grill became a popular hangout for actors and crew from the nearby National Theatre and Warner Theatre. Choreographer and director Bob Fosse was preparing to host a party at Old Ebbitt Grill when he collapsed outside the restaurant and died of a heart attack on September 23, 1987. His revival of Sweet Charity, which he choreographed, had just debuted at the National Theatre. Old Ebbitt began hanging posters in the lobby of current theatrical performances.

In September 1989, President George H. W. Bush and First Lady Barbara Bush met the singer and actor Sting at Old Ebbitt Grill after his Washington debut as Mack the Knife in The Threepenny Opera. The Rolling Stones dined at the restaurant a few weeks later after a concert in the city. In 1991, playwright Neil Simon, director Gene Saks and the cast of the play Lost in Yonkers held the opening night after-party on January 17 at Old Ebbitt Grill. Just minutes before the curtain rose on the Washington debut of the play, the cast learned that the United States had declared war on Iraq and begun the Gulf War. After the world premier of the motion picture The River Wild in August 1994 in Washington, D.C., a reception for the stars was held at Old Ebbitt.

=== 1990s ===
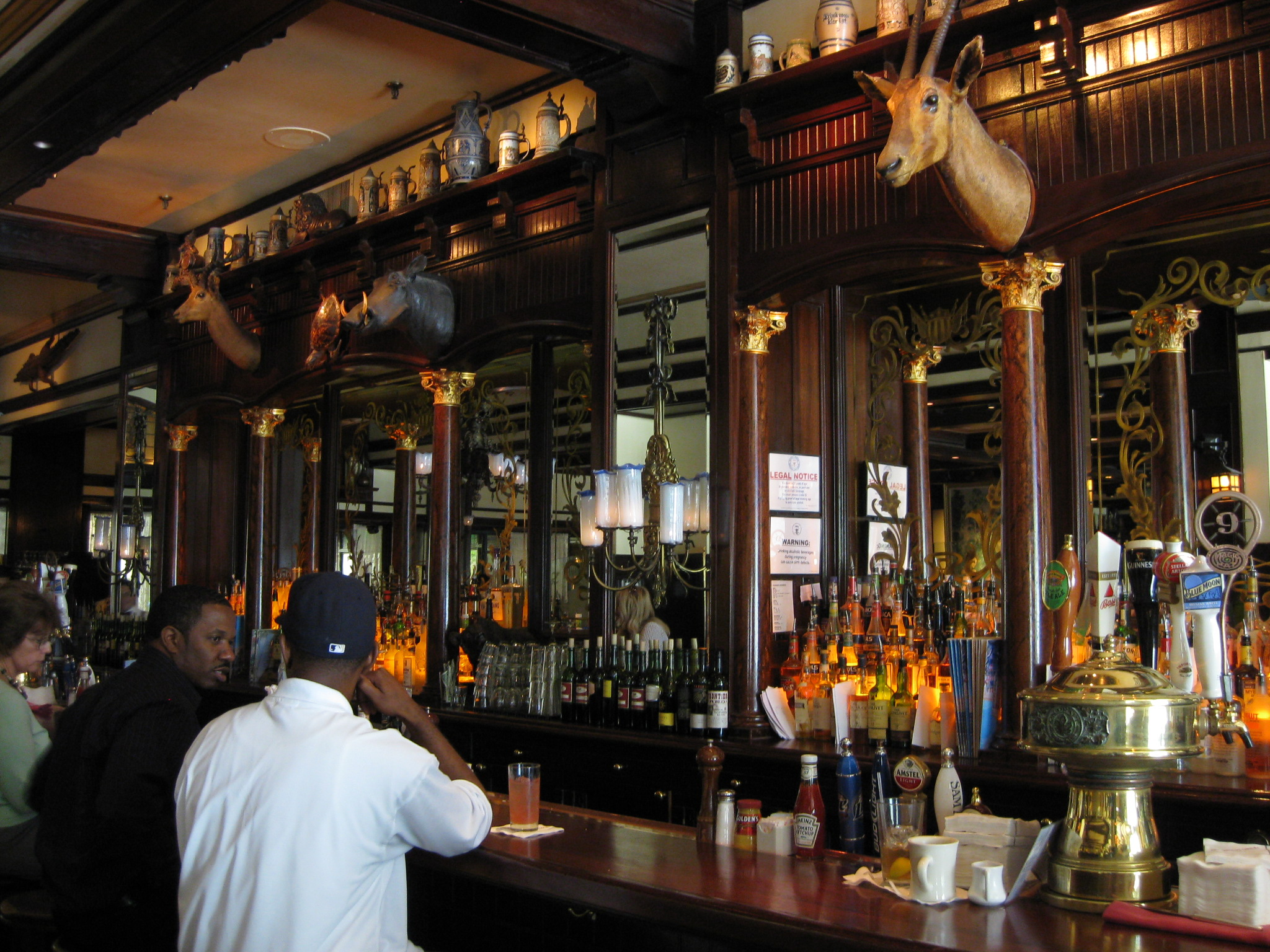
The famous mahogany bar at Old Ebbitt Grill

In the early 1990s, Old Ebbitt Grill was financially one of the best-performing restaurants in the city. In July 1992, the Washington Business Journal said the 390-seat Old Ebbitt Grill grossed more money than any other restaurant in the D.C. metropolitan area. It spent $17,000 a month on table linens. In September 1993, The Washington Post's Phyllis Richman claimed the combination of superb hamburgers with seasonal foods such as fresh Alaskan halibut, corn on the cob in the summer, and locally grown vegetables and berries, was what drew customers. In May 1994, Old Ebbitt Grill added a take-out service, Ebbitt Express, in the atrium section of its restaurant.

In 1995, business dropped after Pennsylvania Avenue NW was closed to street traffic and curbside parking was eliminated in front of the restaurant on 15th Street NW for security reasons following the bombing by an American domestic terrorist of the Oklahoma Federal Building. Some of the business was made up by Ebbitt Express, which by December 1997 was serving 600 meals a day—twice as many as projected.

In 1992, Old Ebbitt Grill's oyster bar closed after diners fell ill from eating raw oysters infected with the deadly Vibrio vulnificus bacteria. The restaurant established a procedure for an independent laboratory to test its oysters for the bacteria prior to consumption. In November 1994, Old Ebbitt Grill reopened its oyster bar to much press attention. In August 1995, Washington Post food critic Eve Zibart said that its highly polished woodwork, counter facing the ice bed and shuckers, and excellent selection of oysters made it a "first-class raw bar". Shortly after the oyster bar reopened, Old Ebbitt Grill lost its long-time chef, Juan Bosio. The restaurant hired Robert McGowan, formerly a chef at Sardi's in New York City.

=== 2000s ===
Security changes in Washington, D.C., after the September 11, 2001, terrorist attacks significantly affected Old Ebbitt Grill for a while. The restaurant was forced to close for two days when streets near the White House were closed. Over the next two weeks, the restaurant lost half its business, which normally ran 2,000 customers a day, most of them politicians and businesspeople. After First Lady Laura Bush began patronizing the restaurant, business soon returned to normal.

The Beltway sniper attacks of fall 2002 did not affect business, which continued to hold steady to February 2003, a time of high alert and anxiety.

In 2004, due to security restrictions, Old Ebbitt Grill was nearly prevented from its traditional practice of selling coffee and hot chocolate to spectators watching the inaugural parade, in this case for the landmark election of Barack Obama as President of the United States. That year the Democratic Leadership Council rented the entire restaurant for a private party on Inauguration Day.

In 2003, Old Ebbitt Grill was busiest on weekends in the spring, when high school student tourist business was at its highest in the city. The restaurant was praised by The Washington Post for being able to accommodate large groups, offering a variety of plain and upscale food, providing friendly service, and having the best raw bar in the city. The restaurant was also criticized by the newspaper for being too noisy for conversation, and providing bland hamburgers, salads, and breakfast.

By 2008, Old Ebbitt Grill's reviews had improved. Post food critic Tom Sietsema continued to laud the friendly service. He praised the Breakfast Club, a deep-fried ham, French toast, and bacon breakfast sandwich. He appreciated small touches such as coat hooks near booths and pepper mills on tables and found the staff's honesty about menu choices refreshing.

In 2009, Old Ebbitt Grill had the fourth or fifth-highest volume of restaurant customers in the United States. Due to its proximity to the White House, it was a favorite of United States Secret Service personnel as well as tourists. In 2010, after the Rally to Restore Sanity and/or Fear, comedian Stephen Colbert hosted a Comedy Central after-party at Old Ebbitt Grill. In attendance were Wyatt Cenac, Rosario Dawson, Mick Foley, Tim Meadows, John Oliver, then a Colbert show regular, and Jamie Hyneman and Adam Savage, the hosts of the MythBusters television series.

=== 2010s ===
In January 2012, Clyde's Restaurant Group chief executive officer John Laytham claimed that Old Ebbitt Grill was the third or fourth highest grossing restaurant in the US. Laytham said the restaurant turned away 800 to 900 customers a day and did $26 million in sales in 2011. In April 2012, sales were 1 percent ahead of 2011. After a slow summer, business at the restaurant had slowed so much that sales were steady compared to 2011.

In 2011, The Washington Post listed Old Ebbitt Grill as one of the top three raw bars in the city. Post food reviewer Tom Sietsema, however, had little good to say about the entrees (nearly all of which he found disappointing) and the service (which he found to be tardy and focused more on getting customers to buy more food). The busy atmosphere, he argued, was not conducive to a positive dining experience.

In December 2012, Old Ebbitt Grill said that it was already booked for a private event for the second inauguration of Barack Obama.

In October 2014, Restaurant Business Magazine reported that Old Ebbitt Grill ranked third in the nation in revenue for 2013. The industry trade publication of record said the restaurant had $26.7 million in revenues in 2013, serving 600,000 meals. Only Tao Asian Bistro in Las Vegas with $64.6 million in revenues and Joe's Stone Crab in Miami, with $35.3 million in revenues, ranked higher.

In July 2019, Clyde's Restaurant Group was acquired by Graham Holdings.

== About the restaurant ==
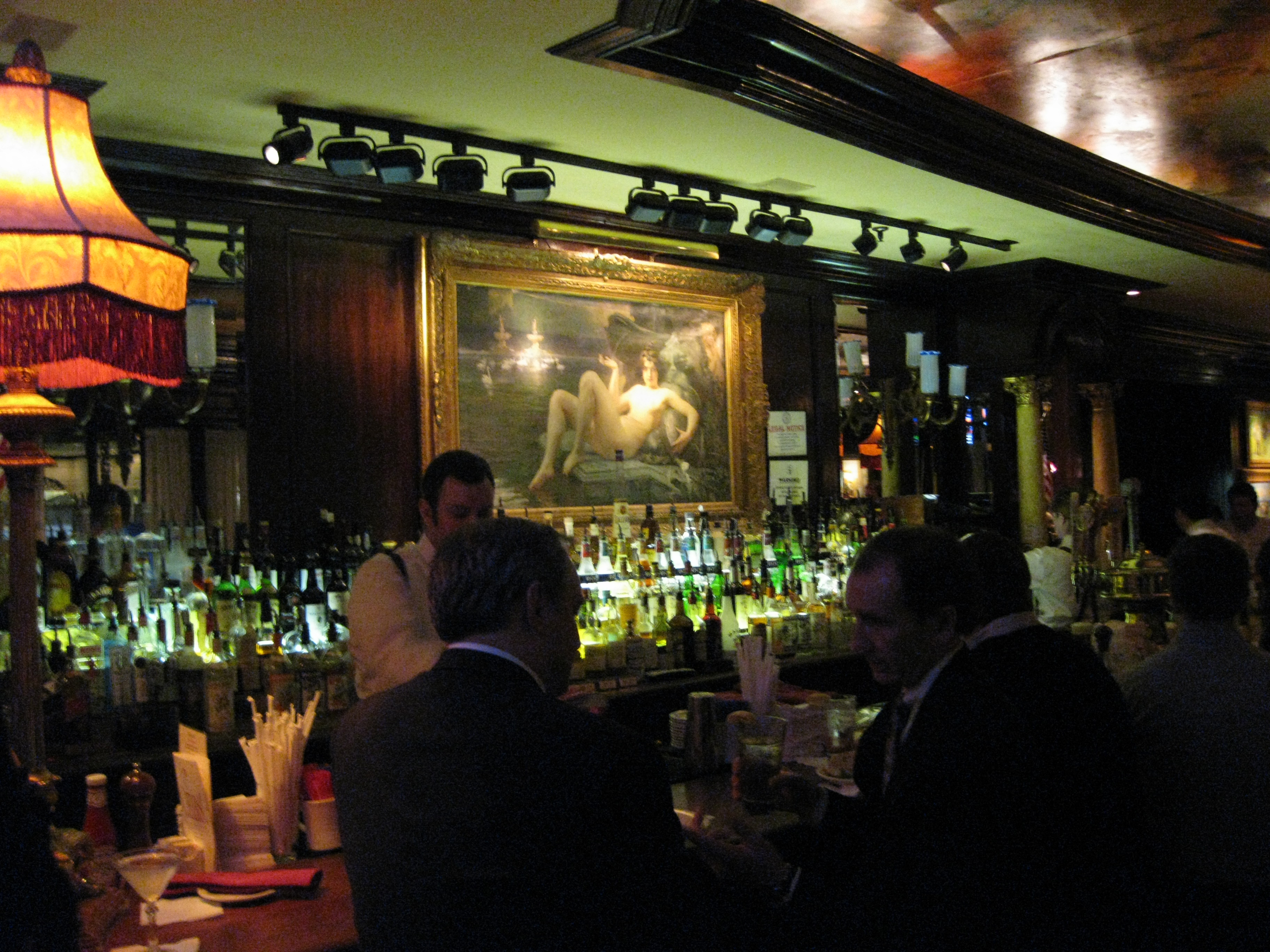
A view of Grant's Bar at Old Ebbitt Grill, featuring a 1900 oil painting by Jean-Paul Gervais.

Old Ebbitt Grill has four bars. The Old Bar is part of the Main Dining Room and features the mounted game trophies. The Oyster Bar is to the right of the entry foyer. Grant's Bar is toward the rear of the restaurant, adjacent to the Atrium Dining Room. The Corner Bar is up the short steps and to the left of the entry foyer, along G Street NW.

The etched glass panels separating the Old Bar from the Main Dining Room were created by Charles Shefts. Grant's Bar, named for American Civil War General Ulysses S. Grant, features a ceiling mural by Carol Loeb. An oil painting by Peter Egeli replicates one of Mathew Brady's famous Civil War photographs of Grant.

The Main Dining Room contains booth seating and limited table seating. The Atrium Dining Room in the rear offers table seating, although fixed, long benches provide some seating. The Atrium Dining Room contains a large marble fountain, and is open to the atrium in the center of Metropolitan Square. Ebbitt Express is located in the Atrium Dining Room.

Downstairs from the entry foyer is the Cabinet Room, a dining room available for private events.

The foyer and Main Dining Room feature paintings by Kamil Kubik, and in the Oyster Bar hang oil paintings by Peter Egeli and watercolors by J. Robert Burnell. The large Howard Chandler Christy painting, "Three Bathers", hangs near the rear of the Main Dining Room. The Corner Bar is decorated with paintings by Claiborne D. Gregory, Jr., and carved waterfowl decoys by numerous artists. Sculptures by John Dreyfuss adorn the Atrium Dining Room. Impressionist works by James Harrington hang throughout the restaurant. Paintings of game birds by Robin Hill hang in the Cabinet Room.

== Awards ==
The Restaurant Association of Metropolitan Washington gave Old Ebbitt Grill its Visitors' Choice Award in 2011.

== Oyster Riot ==
Oyster Riot is an annual oyster eating event held at Old Ebbitt Grill each November on the weekend before Thanksgiving. Although originally a four-hour, all-you-can eat and drink event held on one day, by 2011 Oyster Riot had expanded to a three-day event held on Friday, Saturday, and Sunday.

In October 1995, the first Oyster Riot was held to promote Old Ebbitt Grill's oyster bar. The oyster bar served 15 to 20 different varieties of oyster, and matched them with seven to 10 different types of wine. Oyster Riot proved wildly popular. In 2007, the event sold every ticket in 38 minutes.

== Environment ==
In 2010, Old Ebbitt Grill joined the Shell Recycling Alliance, a project of the Oyster Recovery Partnership, a nonprofit helping to restore oyster populations in the Chesapeake Bay. Old Ebbitt Grill donates its used oyster shells to the alliance, which plants baby oysters, known as "spat", on the shells and deposits them in the bay. The restaurant donated about 14,000 oysters a week to the alliance in 2010.

Old Ebbitt has long composted its food waste. Oyster shells are not compostable and before 2010 were thrown out as garbage. To help the Shell Recycling Alliance, Old Ebbitt Grill introduced a new element to its Oyster Riot, a Saturday afternoon event known as "Matinee Riot." Held at noon, a portion of the proceeds are donated to the Oyster Recovery Partnership.

== Popular culture ==
Old Ebbitt Grill was featured in the 1993 film In the Line of Fire. An exterior scene was shown and then Clint Eastwood and John Mahoney were shown sitting at Grant's Bar inside. A plaque referencing this film is on the wall in Grant's Bar.

Old Ebbitt Grill is mentioned by fictional White House staffer Sam Seaborn in Season 3, Episode 21 of the television show The West Wing. Sam suggests the restaurant for a lunch meeting location.

Alex Kapranos, lead singer for the Scottish rock band Franz Ferdinand, included an entry on Old Ebbitt Grill in his 2006 book, Sound Bites: Eating on Tour With Franz Ferdinand.

Old Ebbitt Grill is mentioned in the novels Path of the Assassin by Brad Thor, The Outlaws by W.E.B. Griffin and William E. Butterworth IV, The Pravda Messenger by Robert Cornuke, The Athena Factor by W. Michael Gear, House Justice by Mike Lawson, The Green Trap by Ben Bova, The Widening Gyre by Robert B. Parker, and Winter of the World by Ken Follett.

== See also ==
- List of the oldest restaurants in the United States
- List of oyster bars

== Bibliography ==
- Barnes, Robert William. Colonial Families of Maryland: Bound and Determined to Succeed. Baltimore, Md.: Genealogical Pub. Co., 2007.
- Barrows, John Henry. Henry Ward Beecher, the Shakespeare of the Pulpit. New York: Funk & Wagnalls, 1893.
- Bova, Ben. The Green Trap. New York: Macmillan, 2007.
- Corning, Amos Elwood. William McKinley: A Biographical Study. New York: Broadway Printing Co., 1907.
- Cornuke, Robert. The Pravda Messenger. New York: Simon and Schuster, 2009.
- Eskew, Garnett Laidlaw. Willard's of Washington, the Epic of a Capital Caravansary. New York: Coward-McCann, 1954.
- Evelyn, Douglas E.; Dickson, Paul; and Ackerman, S.J. On This Spot: Pinpointing the Past in Washington, D.C. Sterling, Va.: Capital Books, 2008.
- Franklin, Samuel Rhoades. Memories of a Rear-Admiral Who Has Served for More Than Half a Century in the Navy of the United States. New York: Harper & Brothers, 1898.
- Gear, W. Michael. The Athena Factor. New York: Macmillan, 2006.
- Goode, James M. Capital Losses: A Cultural History of Washington's Destroyed Buildings. 2d ed. Washington, D.C.: Smithsonian Books, 2003.
- Griffin, W.E.B. and Butterworth IV, William E. The Outlaws. New york: Putnam Adult, 2010.
- Gutheim, Frederick Albert and Lee, Antoinette Josephine. Worthy of the Nation: Washington, DC, From L'Enfant to the National Capital Planning Commission. 2d ed. Baltimore: Johns Hopkins University Press, 2006.
- Henry, Kate Kearney. "Richard Forrest and His Times: 1795-1830." Records of the Columbia Historical Society. 1902.
- Hodgson, Godfrey. Woodrow Wilson's Right Hand: The Life of Colonel Edward M. House. New Haven, Conn.: Yale University Press, 2006.
- Ingham, John N. and Feldman, Lynne B. African-American Business Leaders: A Biographical Dictionary. Westport, Conn.: Greenwood Press, 1994.
- Larner, John B. "Remarks of John B. Larner Before the Society March 10, 1902, in Exhibiting An Old Photograph of the South-East Corner of 14th and F Streets." Records of the Columbia Historical Society. 1903.
- Lawson, Mike. House Justice. New York: Atlantic Monthly Press, 2010.
- Lowry, Thomas Power. The Story the Soldiers Wouldn't Tell: Sex in the Civil War. Mechanicsburg, Pa.: Stackpole Books, 1994.
- Otero, Miguel Antonio. My Life on the Frontier. Santa Fe, N.M.: Sunstone Press, 2007.
- Peck, Garrett. Prohibition in Washington, D.C.: How Dry We Weren't. Charleston, S.C.: History Press, 2011.
- Phillips, Kevin. William McKinley. New York: Times Books, 2003.
- Porteus, Archibald. A Scamper Through Some Cities of America, Being a Record of a Three Months' Tour in the United States and Canada. Glasgow, Scotland: D. Bryce & Son, 1890.
- Reed, Robert. Old Washington, D.C., in Early Photographs: 1846-1932. New York: Dover Publications, 1980.
- Savage, Kirk. Monument Wars: Washington, D.C., the National Mall, and the Transformation of the Memorial Landscape. Berkeley, Calif.: University of California Press, 2009.
- Thor, Brad. Path of the Assassin. New York: Simon and Schuster, 2007.
- Townsend, George Alfred. Washington, Outside and Inside: A Picture and a Narrative of the Origin, Growth, Excellencies, Abuses, Beauties, and Personages of Our Governing City. Chicago: J. Betts & Co., 1874.
- Watson, Winslow Marston. In Memoriam: Benjamin Ogle Tayloe. Philadelphia: Sherman & Co., 1872.
- Zon, Calvin Goddard. The Good Fight That Didn't End: Henry P. Goddard's Accounts of Civil War and Peace. Columbia, S.C.: University of South Carolina Press, 2008.
