= Inspector Gadget (blogger) =

Pseudonymous British police officer and blogger

Inspector Gadget is the pseudonym used by an anonymous British police officer, reportedly an inspector in a rural constabulary in the north west of England, who wrote an influential blog called Police Inspector Blog, between 2006 and 2013.

Started in June 2006 after the author was required to attend a diversity training seminar he described as "60 mind numbing minutes of complete nonsense", Police Inspector Blog was sharply critical of instances of what it considered excessive bureaucracy, health and safety regulation and political correctness in modern British policing. Notable examples include Lincolnshire Police giving guidance to its officers on how to pack their lunches.

It was one of a number of police blogs that appeared in the late 2000s expressing dissatisfaction with the policies of the New Labour government. However, from 2011 onwards Inspector Gadget was also critical of the austerity policies of the Conservative–Liberal Democrat coalition, writing that as a result of police cuts criminals "ruled the streets" of the county he worked in. In response to a post regarding the Plebgate scandal (stemming from the allegation that then Chief Whip Andrew Mitchell called a police officer a "pleb" when leaving Downing Street), the former Minister for Policing Nick Herbert described the "silly blog" as representing a "hot-headed minority" of possibly corrupt police officers opposed to reform, and claimed that Inspector Gadget was not actually an inspector.

The blog was discontinued in March 2013, in response to pressure from senior officers to identify and discourage anonymous police bloggers. As of 2016, its author continued to post under the Inspector Gadget pseudonym on Twitter.

At its peak the blog was mentioned on BBC1's satirical show Have I Got News For You (regarding the Lincolnshire police sandwich story) and the then Deputy Commissioner of the Metropolitan Police Tim Godwin starting his own blog with the words "I'm not quite Inspector Gadget."

In 2013 Inspector Gadget published a book, Perverting The Course Of Justice: The Hilarious And Shocking Inside Story Of British Policing. He also contributed to Wasting More Police Time: Further Adventures In La-La Land (2012), and has written for The Telegraph.

== See also ==
- PC David Copperfield
