= Tower Oaks =

Planned community in Rockville, Maryland

Coordinates: 39.0635°N 77.1491°W

Tower Oaks is a 192-acre planned community in Rockville, Maryland.

== History ==
In 1987, the city council of Rockville approved plans for the development of the site into an office park. In 1998, Boston Properties, which purchased 84 acres of the site, submitted plans for the construction of the first office building.

In January 2002, Anteon Corporation leased 17,000 square feet at 2600 Tower Oaks Blvd.

In November 2002, Clyde's Restaurant Group opened Tower Oaks Lodge. In 2013, it had more than 450,000 guests.

In 2008, Boston Properties developed One Preserve Parkway in Tower Oaks. The building, which was leased to Booz Allen Hamilton and others, was sold in 2014 for $61.25 million to Federal Capital Partners.

In 2008, Lerner Enterprises and Tower Companies completed 2000 Tower Oaks Blvd and both companies moved their headquarters to the building. The companies had started construction of the building in 2005. The building was the first building in the Washington metropolitan area to receive a platinum rating by Leadership in Energy and Environmental Design. The building was selected as a runner-up for the best new office development. In 2015, Stanford Grill opened in the building. In 2017, Nika, an architectural firm, moved its headquarters to the building.

In 2015, Boston Properties and EYA proposed developing 375 residential units in Tower Oaks.
