= Lerner Enterprises =

Commercial real estate development company in the Washington, D.C. area

- Industry: Real estate
- Founded: 1952; 74 years ago
- Headquarters: Tower Oaks; Rockville, Maryland, U.S.
- Area served: United States
- Owner: Lerner family
- Website: lerner.com

Lerner Enterprises is a company owned by the Lerner family that develops and invests in real estate in the Washington metropolitan area. The company has developed more than 20 million square feet of real estate.

== History ==
The company was founded in 1952 by lawyer Ted Lerner, after he borrowed $250 from his wife.

In 1958, the company developed its first shopping center, Wheaton Plaza (now Westfield Wheaton) in partnership with the Gudelsky family.

Shortly thereafter, it bought 2 parcels of land in Tysons, Virginia. In 1968, the company completed development of Tysons Corner Center.

In 1972, the company completed development of Landover Mall in Prince George's County, Maryland, but the mall was closed and demolished in 2002. The company solicited the site as a location for a new headquarters of the Federal Bureau of Investigation.

In 2003, a joint venture between the company and Guggenheim Partners acquired 1275 K Street NW in Washington, D.C. from JBG Smith.

In 2004, in partnership with Tower Companies, the company began development of a 300,000 square foot shopping centre in Virginia and in 2008, the partners completed 2000 Tower Oaks Blvd, a LEED platinum building in Tower Oaks, which became both companies' headquarters.

In 2007, the company completed construction of 20 M Street SE and in 2009, the Bureau of Land Management leased 94,435 square feet of space in the building.

In 2008, the company began constructing a 2-tower combination Hilton Garden Inn and Homewood Suites by Hilton hotel in Rockville.

In 2013, the company broke ground on a 433-unit apartment complex across the street from its Dulles Town Center project and in 2014, the company broke ground on additional developments at Dulles Town Center.

In 2015, the company was subject to a lawsuit after it demolished White Flint Mall to redevelop the site, in violation of a lease with Lord & Taylor.

In February 2016, the company sold 2 office buildings in Fairfax, Virginia.

In 2016, the company completed development of 1775 Tysons in Tysons, Virginia.

In 2018, the company announced that it was looking to sell the site of the former Landover Mall.

On February 12, 2023, Ted Lerner died at age 97.
