= Peter Egeli =

American painter (born 1934)

Peter E. Egeli is a portrait artist whose subjects have included government and academic leaders.

== Early life and education ==
Egeli was born in April 1934. His parents were Bjorn and Lois Baldwin Egeli. After a period of elementary schooling in Cheverly, Maryland, he was home-educated under the Calvert system until he was fourteen. He then attended Charlotte Hall Military Academy and Great Mills High School, where he graduated in 1952.

Egeli's tertiary education took place at George Washington University and the Corcoran School of Art, where he studied with Eugene Weisz and Edmund Archer. In 1953, he joined the U.S. Marine Corps, and was stationed at Marine Barracks 8th & I in Washington, D.C., where he was an illustrator and instructor undertaking such duties as sketching Friday evening parades and drawing training aids.

In 1956, after his tour of duty, he entered Maryland Institute College of Art in Baltimore, where he studied with Jacques Maroger and won the Senior Concours. He then headed to New York City for additional training at the Arts Student’s League, where he studied with Robert Brackman. He then returned to George Washington University to obtain his remaining academic requirements, finally transferring to Maryland Institute College of Art for graduation.

== Career ==
Egeli returned to his family home in Valley Lee to begin his career in painting. Several large portrait commissions came his way as well as copy work done for his father, also a notable portrait painter. In the fall of 1960, Egeli began teaching art part-time at St. Mary’s Seminary, now St. Mary’s College of Maryland, while he continued with his studio work. At the same time he became the President of the St. Mary’s County Art Association, which held large art exhibits at the college. It was during this time that Egeli met Elizabeth Stuart (Stu) Wilkinson, who was also exhibiting. They were married in 1963 and began a life together in the arts.

Egeli insisted on sittings with his portrait clients so that he could capture more of their spirit than a camera could record. He enjoyed the time during the sittings where he would refine his work while talking with his sitter until he felt that he had obtained just the right representation in front of him.

Egeli’s career as a professional artist covers more than sixty years. His portraits included those in the government, education, courts, heads of corporations and foundations. His sitters include, Former Vice President Richard Chaney and William Cohen for the Defense Department, and General Alexander Haig, for Department of State, Admiral Michael Mullen, and General Peter Pace, as Joint Chiefs Chairmen. Also, Secretaries of Transportation, Labor, Agriculture, Commerce, Treasury Energy, Navy, Air Force and 3 Commandants of the Marine Corps. Judicial portraits include those for the U.S. District Court, U.S. Court of Appeals, Supreme Court of New York, and U.S District Court for the District of MD. Peter Egeli’s portraits grace the walls of the Norwegian Embassy, Washington, DC, American Embassy in London and Fortune 500 companies throughout the country. His works in the Maryland State Art Collection include portraits of Senator Ben Cardin, Congressman Steny Hoyer, and former Maryland Governor Marvin Mandel among others.

His works hang at Yale, Smith, Johns Hopkins, Fordham, Vanderbilt, Elon, Rice, Ball State, University of Delaware, Iowa State, New York Stock Exchange, Council on Foreign Relations, New York Bar Association, Colonial Williamsburg Foundation and many others.

His Norwegian heritage gave him a love of boats and the sea. He and his wife built a 30-foot wooden sail boat, which they sailed on the Chesapeake Bay for 25 years. His paintings of the Bay’s skipjack and buy boat fleet told the story of the life of the oystermen at work. He was a Charter Member, Fellow, Past President and Emeritus Member of the American Society of Marine Artists. His paintings at the Old Ebbit Grill, Washington, D.C. show a crabber working and oyster tongers. He enjoyed historical research, in particular on subjects like the Ark and Dove, which he painted and were among the first displays in the reconstructed 1634 State House at St. Mary’s City, and which were later published as prints. Other historical paintings include the Constellation, Virginia, Sandbagger Annie, Orozimbo as well as others.

Egeli’s illustrations appear in several books and in 2014 he published A Life in Images, about the life of his father, Bjorn Egeli.
