= Stuart C. Davidson =

American businessman

- Born: Stuart Carleton Davidson; September 9, 1922; Dayton, Ohio, United States
- Died: August 1, 2001 (aged 78); Oslo, Norway
- Occupation: Businessman
- Years active: 1963–2001
- Spouse: Sally Davidson

Stuart C. Davidson (September 9, 1922 – August 1, 2001) was an American businessman known for being the founder of the Clyde's of Georgetown restaurant in Georgetown, Washington, D.C., and the Clyde's Restaurant Group which owns and operates multiple restaurants in the Washington metropolitan area.

== Biography ==
Davidson was born in Dayton, Ohio, the son of West Point graduate Howard Calhoun Davidson and his wife Mary Perrine (Patterson) Davidson, a daughter of Frank Patterson, co-founder of the National Cash Register Company. He grew up at various Army bases but completed his high school education in Washington, D.C., graduating from St. Albans School. He attended Harvard College, with a two-year break during World War II when he served as a United States Army Air Forces pilot. After completing his A.B. degree in 1947, he also earned a Master of Business Administration from Harvard Business School and worked as an investment banker for Kidder, Peabody & Co. and Wertheim & Co.

In 1963, Davidson opened Clyde's in Georgetown, shortly after the liquor laws in Washington, D.C., were loosened to permit service of hard liquor to patrons standing at bars. The restaurant was immediately profitable, and Davidson partnered with a former Clyde's dishwasher, John G. Laytham, to expand the business to Clyde's Restaurant Group, opening five more Clyde's restaurants, purchasing the Old Ebbitt Grill, and opening several more restaurants in the Washington metropolitan area.

Davidson died of complications from acute myeloid leukemia at a hospital in Oslo, Norway, on August 1, 2001.
