= Clyde's Restaurant Group =

Restaurant owner and operator in the Washington metropolitan area

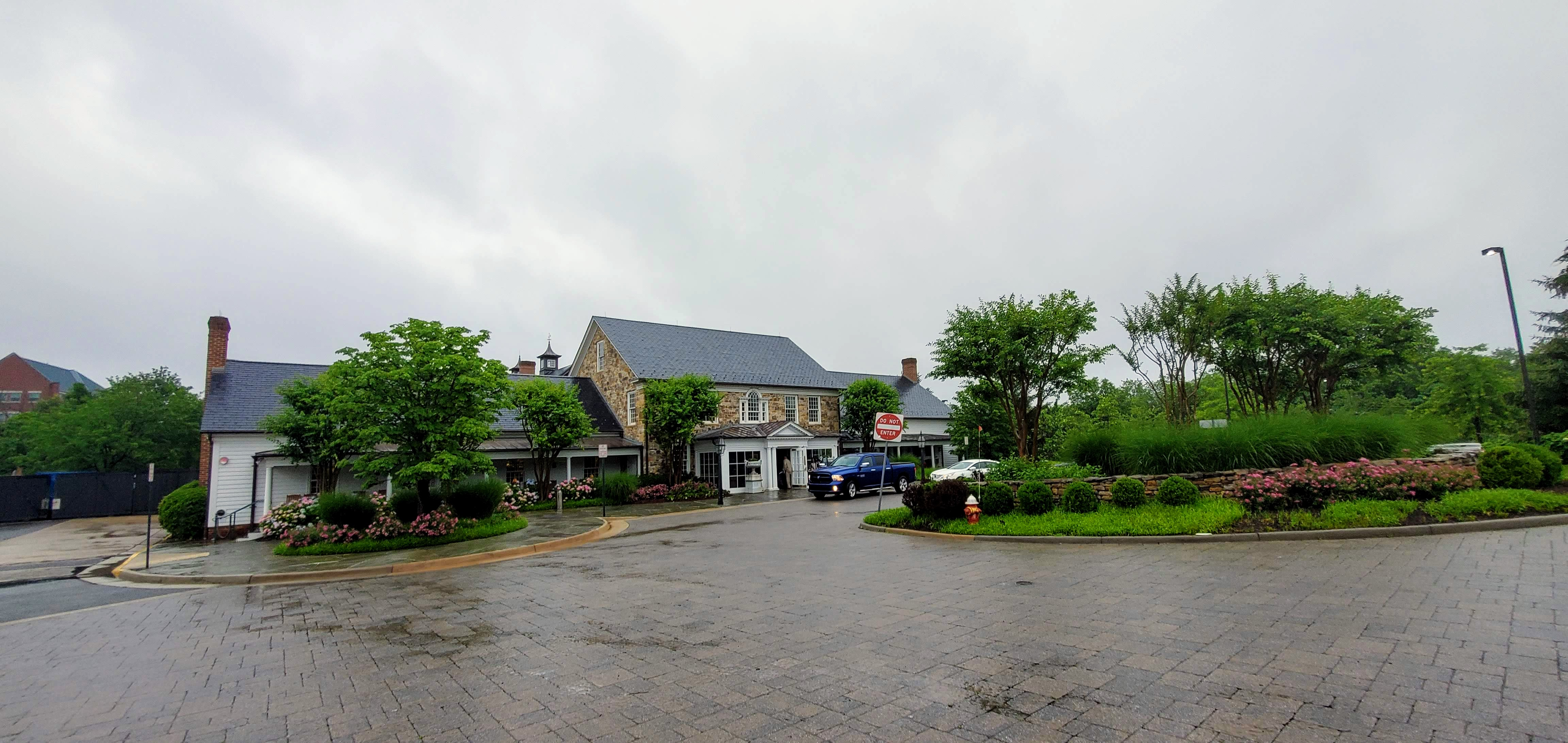
- Clyde's Willow Creek Farm in Broadlands, Virginia (c. 2006)
- Type: Subsidiary
- Industry: Restaurants
- Founded: August 12, 1963; 63 years ago in Georgetown, Washington D.C., United States
- Founders: Stuart C. Davidson; John Laytham
- Number of locations: 15
- Area served: Washington D.C., United States
- Key people: Sally Davidson (Chairman); John McDonnell (President)
- Parent: Graham Holdings
- Website: www.clydesgroup.com

Clyde's Restaurant Group is an American company that owns and operates 15 restaurants in the Washington metropolitan area. Founded in 1963 to take advantage of a change in Washington, D.C.'s liquor laws, it pioneered a number of changes in the way restaurants in the district operated. In 1970, it purchased the oldest restaurant in the district, Old Ebbitt Grill. The company has since expanded its namesake "Clyde's" restaurant into a small chain, as well as opened and purchased other restaurants. In 2019, the company was acquired by Graham Holdings.

== History ==
On August 12, 1963, investment banker Stuart C. Davidson opened Clyde's of Georgetown. For many decades, hard liquor could be served in the District of Columbia only to patrons seated at tables. President John F. Kennedy signed legislation in May 1962 allowing liquor to be sold to patrons standing up. When no other restaurant/bar opened in the district, Davidson decided to enter the restaurant business. Clyde's opened in a former biker bar known as the B&J Restaurant. When B&J lost its lease after one too many brawls occurred there, Davidson rented the two front rooms of the building and established Clyde's there. The oak bar was retained, and the decor changed to an assortment of oddities. The first Clyde's restaurant was in Georgetown, the first bar/restaurant in Georgetown to open on a Sunday, the first restaurant in Georgetown to serve brunch, and the first restaurant in Georgetown to hire women as waiters. Georgetown University student John Laytham began working at Clyde's as a busboy six months after it opened. Although he never graduated from the university, in 1968 Laytham became the restaurant's general manager. In 1970, Davidson asked Laytham to join him as a partner in Clyde's (giving him 20 percent of the ownership). In 1970, Davidson and Laytham purchased the Old Ebbitt Grill, which originally opened in 1856.

The 1976 hit song "Afternoon Delight" by Starland Vocal Band was inspired by a spicy happy hour menu at Clyde's of Georgetown titled "afternoon delights", that included items like spiced shrimp and hot Brie with almonds. Writer Bill Danoff, inspired by the menu's name, came home and explained to his wife what "afternoon delights" really should mean, becoming the seed for the creation of a song that drips with sexual innuendo.

Clyde's Restaurant Group subsequently opened more locations under the "Clyde's" name: in Columbia, Maryland (1975); Tysons Corner, Virginia (1980); Reston Town Center in Reston, Virginia (1991); Chevy Chase, Maryland (1995); Alexandria, Virginia (1998); and Gallery Place in Washington, D.C. (2005). In December 1985, Clyde's Restaurant Group purchased from founder Richard J. McCooey three notable D.C. drinking and dining establishments: The Tombs, 1789 Restaurant, and F. Scott's. These restaurants underwent a significant renovation from 2016 to 2018, and F. Scott's was closed, becoming a new bar and lounge area for 1789.

Clyde's Restaurant Group also opened several restaurants which are not branded under the "Clyde's" name. These include The Tomato Palace (1993), which opened in the same building as Clyde's of Columbia, separated by a short hallway and sharing some resources such as bathroom space; Tower Oaks Lodge in the Tower Oaks development of Rockville, Maryland (2002); Clyde's Willow Creek Farm in Broadlands, Virginia (2006); and The Hamilton in Washington, D.C. (2011). According to co-founder John Laytham, Boston Properties, the developer of the Tower Oaks office park, allowed Clyde's restaurant use of the land rent-free, and built the infrastructure of the restaurant at no cost. The Van Metre Companies, developer of the Broadlands mixed-use planned community, provided the same package of rent-free land and no-cost infrastructure to allow the construction of Clyde's Willow Creek Farm. Clyde's Restaurant Group also received a major financial incentive to open 37,500-square-foot (3,480 m^{2}) The Hamilton. The company secured a 40-year lease from the landlord (Germany-based Deka Immobilien Investment) at $20.00 per square foot, which rises to just $29 per square foot after 40 years. Although the multi-level restaurant and music venue cost $24 million to construct, the District of Columbia gave Clyde's $5 million in tax increment financing. Within a year of its opening, Laytham said it employed 355 people. According to Laytham in 2012, the company was opening a new location "every few years".

Clyde's of Tysons Corner closed on February 5, 2017, to make way for development of the Tysons Central residential and commercial building project. On July 4, 2017, Clyde's Restaurant Group closed The Tomato Palace, and repurposed the 4,600-square-foot (430 m^{2}) space into a music venue called The Soundry, which opened on June 1, 2018. After several years of struggling sales, followed by the blow from the COVID-19 pandemic, Clyde's of Columbia and The Soundry permanently closed on July 19, 2020. Clyde's of Reston closed on May 21, 2022.

In March 2023, Clyde's Restaurant Group announced that it would open Ebbitt House, a spinoff of Old Ebbitt Grill, in the Reston Station development center. It opened on November 20, 2026.

In May 2023, Clyde's purchased Rye Street Tavern, a two-story, 12,000-square-foot (1,100 m^{2}) waterfront restaurant in South Baltimore's Port Covington neighborhood that opened in 2017 and closed in 2021, from Andrew Carmellini's NoHo Hospitality. They announced plans to make "significant improvements" to the space, including a remodeled kitchen and the addition of an oyster bar and an outdoor dining and bar area. It reopened on July 15, 2024.

In July 2023, Clyde's announced that it would open Cordelia Fishbar, a seafood restaurant focused on charcoal grilling, in Union Market in Washington, D.C. It opened on November 20, 2024.

On June 15, 2026, Clyde's opened a location in Dulles International Airport.

Clyde's founder Stuart Davidson died on August 1, 2001. Clyde's co-owner and CEO John Laytham died on January 3, 2019. In July 2019, Clyde's Restaurant Group was acquired by Graham Holdings.
