= PC David Copperfield =

Pen name of Stuart Davidson

PC David Copperfield is the pen name of Stuart Davidson, formerly of the Staffordshire Police, who is believed to have been the first police blogger. He later wrote a best-selling book about the British police service, Wasting Police Time, while serving as a police constable. He is now serving as a police officer in Canada.

== Blogging ==
Copperfield began blogging in 2004. He initially wrote about his passion for gardening, but he found that his references to his working life in the police attracted far more interest and so he switched to commenting on law and order issues.

In 2005 a number of his blog posts were used without his permission by the newspaper the Mail on Sunday for a three-page article. The use of the material attracted protest from fellow bloggers, and Copperfield jokingly described the journalists as "bastards". However, the article also attracted the attention of a number of publishers and agents, eventually leading to his first book.

== Wasting Police Time ==
In early 2006 Copperfield signed a book deal with Monday Books to turn his blog into a book. For its title he chose the term "wasting police time", a criminal offence under British law. Wasting Police Time was published in October 2006. It chronicles Copperfield's despair at the way policing in his town – dubbed "Newtown" but later revealed to be Burton upon Trent) – stopped functioning properly.

The blurb on the back of the book's dust jacket asks:

Ever wondered why you can't find a policeman when you need one? PC David Copperfield has the answer ... they're all inside the station, writing reports, photocopying, stapling and filing – when they're not getting caught up in the petty squabbles of the underclass. Wasting Police Time is his hilarious and shocking diary of life as a modern British bobby. It's the first book to spill the beans about the way senior police officers waste our money while fiddling the crime figures and scrambling to meet bogus Home Office targets. Copperfield's chief constable won't like it, and neither will the government. But honest taxpayers, sick of being fleeced while criminals rule our streets, will relish every word.

His writing revealed the amount of time that police were taking to deal with relatively petty crimes. He described in detail the hugely complicated paperwork process that meant, for example, that the theft of a bicycle by three boys took around 20 hours (over the course of a month or so) to clear up. This resonated with large sections of the British public – and media – , who wondered how so much more money could have been spent on the police service for apparently so little return.

The book was serialised in the Daily Mail, the sister publication of the paper that had earlier printed his material without permission, and Copperfield found himself in great demand from other newspapers and media outlets.

== Wasting More Police Time ==
In February 2012 Monday Books published Wasting More Police Time: Further Adventures in La, La Land. It contains stories from anonymous police officers serving in the UK, including the whistle blower and blogger Inspector Gadget.

== Media appearances ==
Copperfield appeared on the BBC's flagship news show Newsnight, wrote articles for The Daily Telegraph and was written about in almost every British newspaper. Nick Cohen in The Observer named Wasting Police Time as one of the three "most important political books" of the day. Copperfield was invited to appear on the BBC Radio 5 Live chat shows of both Victoria Derbyshire and Simon Mayo. On Jon Gaunt's national Talksport network radio show – where he appeared twice – he said: "I'm just an ordinary copper who wrote a funny book about what it's like in the police now."

He was invited to discuss criminal justice policy with shadow cabinet members – having described himself in his book as "conservative with a small c" – and was a main speaker at a law-and-order seminar arranged by the Policy Exchange thinktank. However, when Labour Minister of State for Police Tony McNulty MP discussed the book on the floor of the House of Commons in late 2006, he attempted to dismiss it, describing it as "more of a fiction than Dickens".

Until that time PC Copperfield's real identity had been protected. but in the spring of 2007 Copperfield – accompanied by his editor from Monday Books – met producers from BBC Television's current affairs programme Panorama to discuss the revelation of his identity on an episode broadcast on 17 September 2007. Copperfield revealed that he was PC Stuart Davidson of the Staffordshire Police. His fictional "Newtown" was actually the Midlands brewing centre of Burton-upon-Trent.

Shortly before the programme was shown Copperfield was summoned to a meeting with his Chief Constable to discuss his "other career" as a writer. He had evaded his force's Professional Standards Department for several years, but suspicions regarding his secret identity were voiced after he had appeared on GMTV and Sky News – his face obscured, his voice unaltered – as well as numerous radio programmes, to discuss UK policing. By that stage Davidson had already applied to join Edmonton Police Service (EPS) in Edmonton, Alberta; later the same year he left for Canada, where he now works for the EPS.

In July 2010 Davidson wrote a 1,000-word essay for the Sunday Telegraph explaining how policing in Edmonton was cheaper, quicker and more effective than in the UK, and how this meant, by extension, that forthcoming cuts to UK police budgets need not necessarily mean fewer frontline police on British streets.
