= 2022 United States House of Representatives elections in New York =

- November 8, 2022

All 26 New York seats to the United States House of Representatives
	Majority party	Minority party
Party	Democratic	Republican
Last election	19	8
Seats won	15	11
Seat change	▼4	▲3
Popular vote	3,199,496	2,525,335
Percentage	55.59%	43.88%
Swing	▼6.40%	▲7.58%

Democratic hold
Republican hold Republican gain
Democratic
50–60%
60–70%
70–80%
80–90%
90–100%
Republican
50–60%
60–70%
70–80%

The 2022 United States House of Representatives elections in New York were held on November 8, 2022, to elect the 26 U.S. representatives from the State of New York, one from each of the state's 26 congressional districts. The elections coincided with elections for governor, U.S. Senate, attorney general, comptroller, state senate, and assembly, and various other state and local elections.

Following the 2020 census, New York lost one seat in the U.S. House. Incumbent representatives Lee Zeldin (R), Thomas Suozzi (D), Kathleen Rice (D), John Katko (R), Chris Jacobs (R), and Joe Sempolinski (R) retired. Representatives Carolyn Maloney (D) and Mondaire Jones (D) lost renomination in their primary contests. The primary elections were set to happen on June 28, but due to a court-ordered redraw of the state's Congressional maps, they were held on August 23. Due in part to Kathy Hochul's relatively weak performance in the governor's race and heavy pro-Republican turnout, the Democratic Party lost four seats.

With 11 seats held, this is the most seats won by Republicans since 2000, and the best performance in the popular vote since 2002.

== 2020–22 redistricting controversy ==
Following the 2020 census, New York lost one Congressional seat and its Independent Redistricting Commission (IRC) attempted to draw a new map. However they could not reach an agreement on the map, and the Democratic-dominated New York State Legislature drew their own new Congressional map. In April 2022, in the lead-up to the 2022 midterms, the New York State Court of Appeals struck down the map, known infamously as the "Hochulmander" (named after New York State Governor Kathy Hochul) as an unconstitutional partisan gerrymander that failed to follow the proper procedures. The court then assigned an Independent Special Master to create a new map. In the 2022 House election in New York, under the new map, the Republican Party flipped three seats, bringing the new seat count of 15 for the Democrats and 11 held by Republicans. The court-drawn map is often credited with helping the Republican Party win back control of the House, due to the narrow margin of the Republican majority.

== Overview ==
In some races, candidates appeared on multiple ballot lines, with Democratic candidates often appearing on the Working Families line and Republican candidates often appearing on the Conservative line. However, they all caucus with either the Democrats or the Republicans.

United States House of Representatives elections in New York, 2022
Party	Votes	Percentage	Seats	+/–
Democratic	3,028,115	52.61%	15	▼4
Republican	2,233,120	38.80%	11	▲3
Conservative	320,049	5.56%	0	
Working Families	167,605	2.91%	0	
Independent	6,749	0.12%	0	
Totals	5,755,638	100.00%	26	

Popular vote
Democratic	52.61%
Republican	38.80%
Other	8.59%

House seats by party nomination
Democratic	57.69%
Conservative	42.31%
Republican	42.31%
Working Families	34.62%

House seats by party registration
Democratic	57.69%
Republican	42.31%

=== By district ===
Candidates on multiple ballot lines are marked as the party they caucus with.

District	Democratic		Republican		Others		Total		Result
District	Votes	%	Votes	%	Votes	%	Votes	%	Result
District 1	141,907	44.49%	177,040	55.51%	0	0.00%	318,947	100.0%	Republican hold
District 2	97,774	39.27%	151,178	60.73%	0	0.00%	248,952	100.0%	Republican hold
District 3	125,404	46.24%	145,824	53.76%	0	0.00%	271,228	100.0%	Republican gain
District 4	130,871	48.20%	140,622	51.80%	0	0.00%	271,493	100.0%	Republican gain
District 5	104,396	75.21%	34,407	24.79%	0	0.00%	138,803	100.0%	Democratic hold
District 6	85,049	63.95%	47,935	36.05%	0	0.00%	132,984	100.0%	Democratic hold
District 7	119,473	80.69%	28,597	19.31%	0	0.00%	148,070	100.0%	Democratic hold
District 8	99,079	71.72%	39,060	28.28%	0	0.00%	138,139	100.0%	Democratic hold
District 9	116,970	81.52%	0	0.00%	26,521	18.48%	143,491	100.0%	Democratic hold
District 10	160,582	84.04%	29,058	15.21%	1,447	0.76%	191,087	100.0%	Democratic hold
District 11	71,801	38.23%	115,992	61.77%	0	0.00%	187,793	100.0%	Republican hold
District 12	200,890	81.76%	44,173	17.98%	631	0.26%	245,694	100.0%	Democratic hold
District 13	116,589	100.00%	0	0.00%	0	0.00%	116,589	100.0%	Democratic hold
District 14	82,453	70.72%	31,935	27.39%	2,208	1.89%	116,596	100.0%	Democratic hold
District 15	76,406	82.79%	15,882	17.21%	0	0.00%	92,288	100.0%	Democratic hold
District 16	133,567	64.30%	74,156	35.70%	0	0.00%	207,723	100.0%	Democratic hold
District 17	141,730	49.68%	143,550	50.32%	0	0.00%	285,280	100.0%	Republican gain
District 18	135,245	50.67%	131,653	49.33%	0	0.00%	266,898	100.0%	Democratic hold
District 19	141,509	49.22%	146,004	50.78%	0	0.00%	287,513	100.0%	Republican gain
District 20	160,420	55.07%	130,869	44.93%	0	0.00%	291,289	100.0%	Democratic hold
District 21	116,421	40.85%	168,579	59.15%	0	0.00%	285,000	100.0%	Republican hold
District 22	132,913	49.51%	135,544	50.49%	0	0.00%	268,457	100.0%	Republican hold
District 23	104,114	35.08%	192,694	64.92%	0	0.00%	296,808	100.0%	Republican hold
District 24	95,028	34.30%	182,054	65.70%	0	0.00%	277,082	100.0%	Republican hold
District 25	152,022	53.87%	130,190	46.13%	0	0.00%	282,212	100.0%	Democratic hold
District 26	156,883	63.98%	88,339	36.02%	0	0.00%	245,222	100.0%	Democratic hold
Total	3,199,496	55.59%	2,525,335	43.88%	30,807	0.54%	5,755,638	100.0%	

== District 1 ==
2022 New York's 1st congressional district election
- November 8, 2022
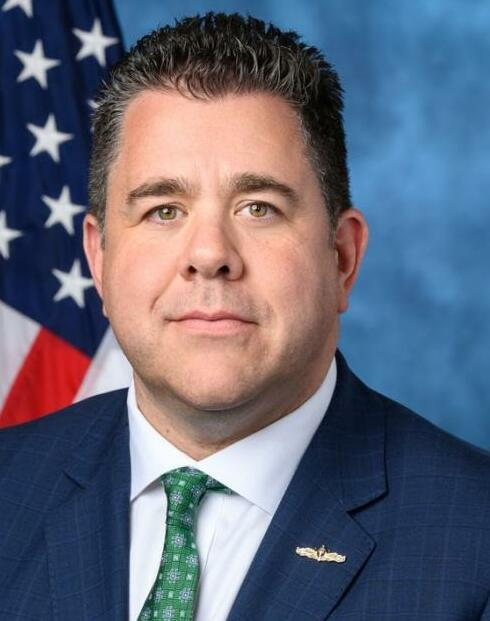

Nominee	Nick LaLota	Bridget Fleming
Party	Republican	Democratic
Alliance	Conservative	Working Families
Popular vote	177,040	141,907
Percentage	55.5%	44.5%
- County results LaLota: 50–60%
U.S. Representative before election
Lee Zeldin
Republican
Elected U.S. Representative
Nick LaLota
Republican

The 1st district is based on the eastern end and North Shore of Long Island, including the Hamptons, the North Fork, Riverhead, Port Jefferson, Smithtown, and Huntington, all in Suffolk County. Due to redistricting, the district lost most of Brookhaven to the 2nd district and picked up Huntington from the 3rd district. The district had a PVI of R+4 but voted for Joe Biden by 0.2 points in 2020. The incumbent was Republican Lee Zeldin, who was reelected with 54.8% of the vote in 2020. He was retiring to run for governor.

Republicans chose their nominee, Nick LaLota, to succeed Zeldin in a three-way primary in late August, the endorsed candidate of their county committee. The primary looked to be a race between him and Anthony Figliola, a former Brookhaven deputy supervisor who argued his independence from the county party leadership made him the better choice, until Michelle Bond, head of the Association for Digital Asset Marketing, a cryptocurrency trade group, filed petitions to run right before the deadline. Ultimately, LaLota won the primary with 47 percent of the vote. Bond finished with 28 percent to Figliola's 25 percent.

=== Republican/Conservative nominee ===
- Nick LaLota, former Suffolk County Board of Elections commissioner and chief of staff to Suffolk County legislator Kevin McCaffrey

==== Eliminated in primary ====
- Michelle Bond, businesswoman
- Anthony Figliola, former deputy supervisor of Brookhaven

==== Withdrawn / disqualified ====
- Robert Cornicelli, veteran and supervisor of Department of Public Works inspectors in Oyster Bay (running in New York's 2nd congressional district)
- Cait Corrigan
- Dean Gandley (endorsed LaLota)
- Patrick Hahn
- Edward Francis Moore Jr., businessman

==== Declined ====
- Lee Zeldin, incumbent U.S. representative (ran for governor)

==== Endorsements ====
Robert Cornicelli (withdrawn)

Executive branch officials

- Michael Flynn, former National Security Advisor of the United States (2017) (Democrat)
Nick LaLota

State officials

- Phil Boyle, New York state senator
- Keith Brown, New York state assemblyman
- Michael J. Fitzpatrick, New York state assemblyman
- Jodi Giglio, New York state assemblywoman
- Mario Mattera, New York state senator
- Anthony Palumbo, New York state senator
- Doug Smith, New York state assemblyman

Organizations

- Conservative Party of Suffolk County
- New York Federation of College Republicans
- Republican Party of Suffolk County
Michelle Bond

Federal officials

- Ted Cruz, US senator from Texas

Individuals

- Donald Trump Jr., political activist, businessman, author, and former television presenter

==== Debate ====
2022 New York's 1st congressional district Republican primary debate
No.	Date	Host	Moderator	Link	Republican	Republican	Republican
Key: P Participant A Absent N Not invited I Invited W Withdrawn							
Key: P Participant A Absent N Not invited I Invited W Withdrawn					Michelle Bond	Anthony Figliola	Nick LaLota
1	Aug. 1, 2022	Schneps Media	Jane Hanson; Stephen Witt		N	P	P

==== Primary results ====
Republican primary results
Party	Candidate	Votes	%
Republican	Nick LaLota	12,368	47.2
Republican	Michelle Bond	7,289	27.8
Republican	Anthony Figliola	6,569	25.0
Total votes		26,226	100.0

=== Democratic/Working Families nominee ===
- Bridget Fleming, member of the Suffolk County Legislature for the 2nd district and candidate for this district in 2020

==== Did not make the ballot ====
- Alexandre Zajic

==== Withdrawn ====
- Nicholas Antonucci, educator and executive director of Sachem Professional Development, Inc.
- John Atkinson (endorsed Hahn)
- Kara Hahn, deputy presiding officer of and member of the Suffolk County Legislature for the 5th district (endorsed Fleming)
- Austin Smith, bankruptcy attorney

==== Endorsements ====
Kara Hahn (withdrawn)

State officials

- Steve Englebright, member of the New York State Assembly for the 4th district

Individuals

- John Atkinson, former candidate in the Democratic primary for this district in 2022
- Perry Gershon, Democratic nominee for this district in 2018
- Nancy Goroff, chemist and Democratic nominee for this district in 2020
- Anna Throne-Holst, former Southampton town supervisor & councilperson; Democratic nominee in for this district in 2016
Bridget Fleming

State officials

- Fred Thiele Jr., member of the New York State Assembly for the 1st district

Local officials

- Robert Calarco, former member of the Suffolk County Legislature for the 7th district (2012–2021)
- Tom Donnelly, member of the Suffolk County Legislature for the 17th district
- Samuel Gonzales, member of the Suffolk County Legislature for the 9th district
- Kara Hahn, deputy presiding officer of and member of the Suffolk County Legislature for the 5th district
- Al Krupski, member of the Suffolk County Legislature for the 1st district

Organizations

- League of Conservation Voters
- Sierra Club
- Transport Workers Union of America

=== General election ===
==== Predictions ====
Source	Ranking	As of
The Cook Political Report	Lean R	May 23, 2022
Inside Elections	Lean R	November 3, 2022
Sabato's Crystal Ball	Lean R	May 25, 2022
Politico	Lean R	May 27, 2022
RCP	Safe R	June 9, 2022
Fox News	Lean R	July 11, 2022
DDHQ	Likely R	July 20, 2022
FiveThirtyEight	Likely R	October 20, 2022
The Economist	Lean R	September 28, 2022

==== Post-primary endorsements ====
Nick LaLota (R)

Organizations

- National Federation of Independent Business

Labor unions

- N.Y.C. District Council of Carpenters

Newspapers

- New York Post
Bridget Fleming (D)

Organizations

- Suffolk County Police Benevolent Association

==== Results ====
New York's 1st congressional district, 2022
Party	Candidate	Votes	%
Republican	Nick LaLota	154,046	48.3
Conservative	Nick LaLota	22,994	7.2
Total	Nick LaLota	177,040	55.5
Democratic	Bridget Fleming	135,170	42.4
Working Families	Bridget Fleming	6,737	2.1
Total	Bridget Fleming	141,907	44.5
Write-in		48	0.0
Total votes		318,995	100.0
Republican hold			

== District 2 ==
2022 New York's 2nd congressional district election
- November 8, 2022
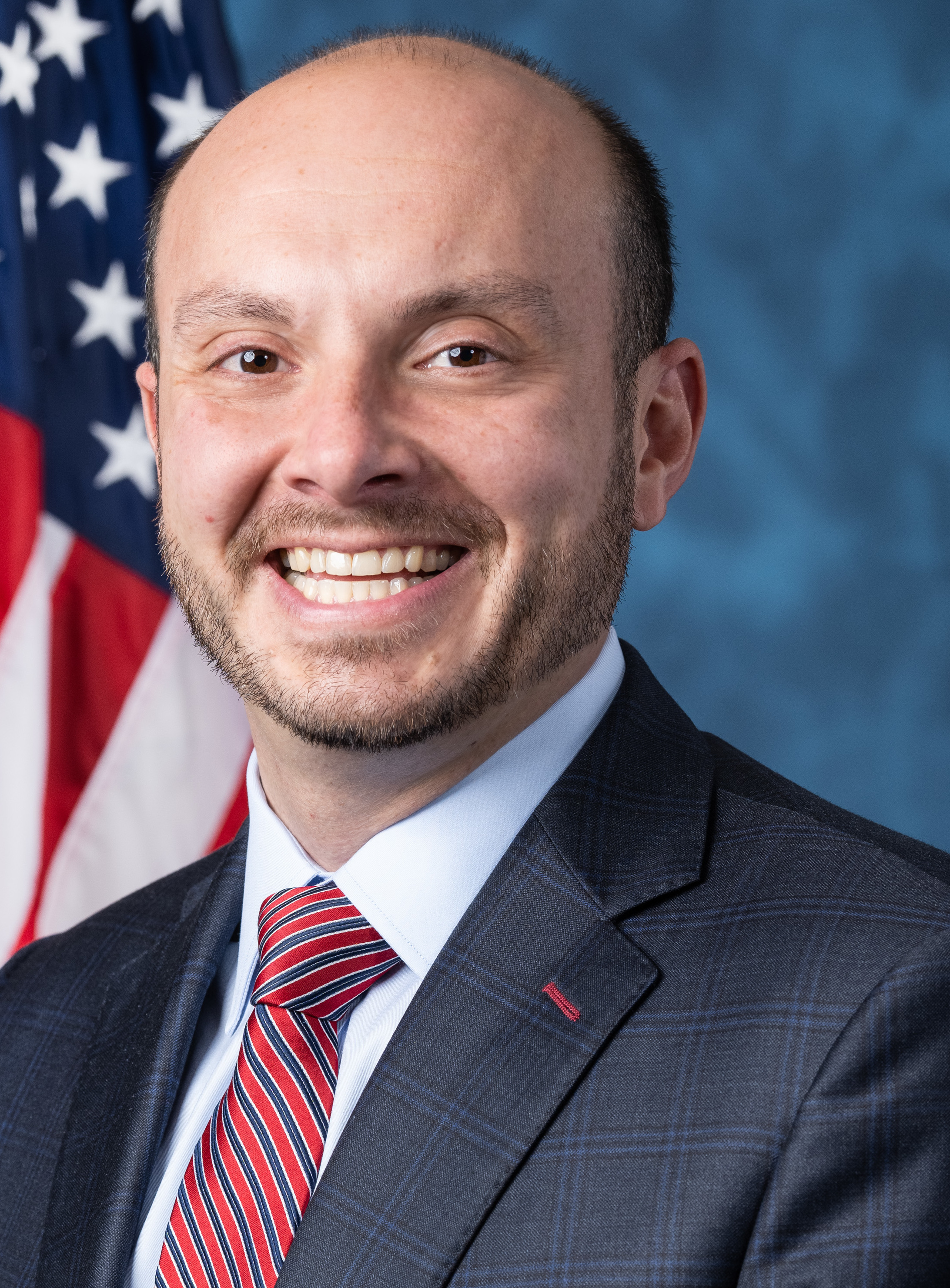

Nominee	Andrew Garbarino	Jackie Gordon
Party	Republican	Democratic
Alliance	Conservative	Working Families
Popular vote	151,178	97,774
Percentage	60.7%	39.3%
- Garbarino: 40–50% 50–60% 60–70% 70–80% 80–90% 90–100% Gordon: 50–60% 60–70% 70–80% 80–90% 90–100% No results
U.S. Representative before election
Andrew Garbarino
Republican
Elected U.S. Representative
Andrew Garbarino
Republican

The 2nd district is based on the South Shore of Suffolk County, including the towns of Babylon, Islip, and most of Brookhaven all in Suffolk County, and a small part of Oyster Bay in Nassau County. Due to redistricting, the district lost portions of Nassau County and now stretches farther east along the South Shore. The district had a PVI of R+4 and voted for Donald Trump by 1.5 points in 2020. The incumbent was Republican Andrew Garbarino, who was elected with 52.9% of the vote in 2020.

=== Republican/Conservative nominee ===
==== Nominee ====
- Andrew Garbarino, incumbent U.S. representative

==== Eliminated in primary ====
- Robert Cornicelli, U.S. Navy and U.S. Army National Guard veteran, Town of Oyster Bay Sanitation Inspector Supervisor
- Cait Corrigan, pastor
- Mike Rakebrandt, combat veteran and NYPD detective

==== Endorsements ====
Robert Cornicelli

Individuals

- Michael Flynn, retired United States Army lieutenant general and 24th United States National Security Advisor (Democrat)
- Steven Wickstrom, retired Army National Guard officer

Organizations

- New York Young Republican Club
Andrew Garbarino

Organizations

- Pro-Israel America

Newspapers

- New York Post (post-primary)

Labor unions

- New York State United Teachers
Mike Rakebrandt

Organizations

- Nassau County Libertarian Party

==== Debate ====
2022 New York's 2nd congressional district Republican primary debate
No.	Date	Host	Moderator	Link	Republican	Republican	Republican	Republican
Key: P Participant A Absent N Not invited I Invited W Withdrawn								
Key: P Participant A Absent N Not invited I Invited W Withdrawn					Robert Cornicelli	Cait Corrigan	Andrew Garbarino	Mike Rakebrandt
1	Jul. 29, 2022	Schneps Media	Jane Hanson; Stephen Witt		P	N	A	P

==== Primary results ====
Republican primary results
Party	Candidate	Votes	%
Republican	Andrew Garbarino (incumbent)	10,425	53.7
Republican	Robert Cornicelli	7,302	37.6
Republican	Mike Rakebrandt	1,679	8.7
Total votes		19,406	100.0

=== Democratic nominee ===
- Jackie Gordon, Babylon town councilwoman, U.S. Army veteran, and Democratic nominee for the 2nd district in 2020 (previously filed to run in the 1st district)

==== Endorsements ====
Jackie Gordon

Organizations

- EMILY's List
- Human Rights Campaign PAC
- League of Conservation Voters
- NARAL Pro-Choice America
- New Democrat Coalition
- New Politics
- Sierra Club
- VoteVets.org

Labor unions

- New York State United Teachers

=== General election ===
==== Predictions ====
Source	Ranking	As of
The Cook Political Report	Likely R	May 23, 2022
Inside Elections	Lean R	May 25, 2022
Sabato's Crystal Ball	Likely R	May 25, 2022
Politico	Likely R	May 27, 2022
RCP	Safe R	June 9, 2022
Fox News	Solid R	July 11, 2022
DDHQ	Likely R	August 24, 2022
FiveThirtyEight	Solid R	June 30, 2022
The Economist	Likely R	September 28, 2022

==== Post-primary endorsements ====
Andrew Garbarino

Labor unions

- N.Y.C. District Council of Carpenters

==== Polling ====
Poll source	Date(s) administered	Sample size (Note: Key: A – all adults RV – registered voters LV – likely voters V – unclear)	Margin of error	Andrew Garbarino (R)	Jackie Gordon (D)	Undecided
GQR Research (D) (Note: This poll was sponsored by the Democratic Congressional Campaign Committee.)	July 21–31, 2022	500 (LV)	± 4.4%	49%	48%	3%

==== Results ====
New York's 2nd congressional district, 2022
Party	Candidate	Votes	%
Republican	Andrew Garbarino	130,798	52.5
Conservative	Andrew Garbarino	20,380	8.2
Total	Andrew Garbarino (incumbent)	151,178	60.7
Democratic	Jackie Gordon	93,299	37.5
Working Families	Jackie Gordon	4,475	1.8
Total	Jackie Gordon	97,774	39.3
Write-in		80	0.0
Total votes		249,032	100.0
Republican hold			

== District 3 ==
2022 New York's 3rd congressional district election
- November 8, 2022
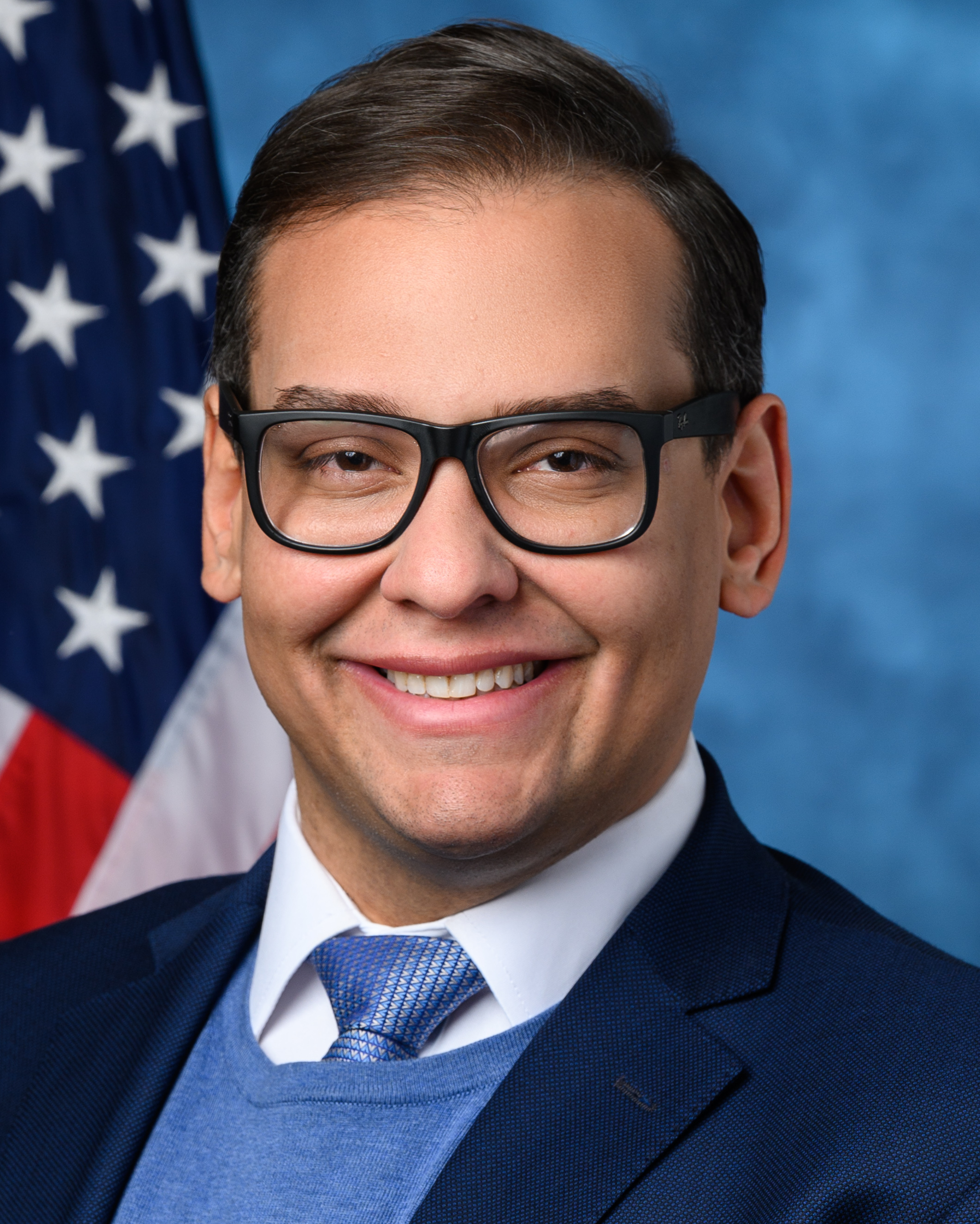

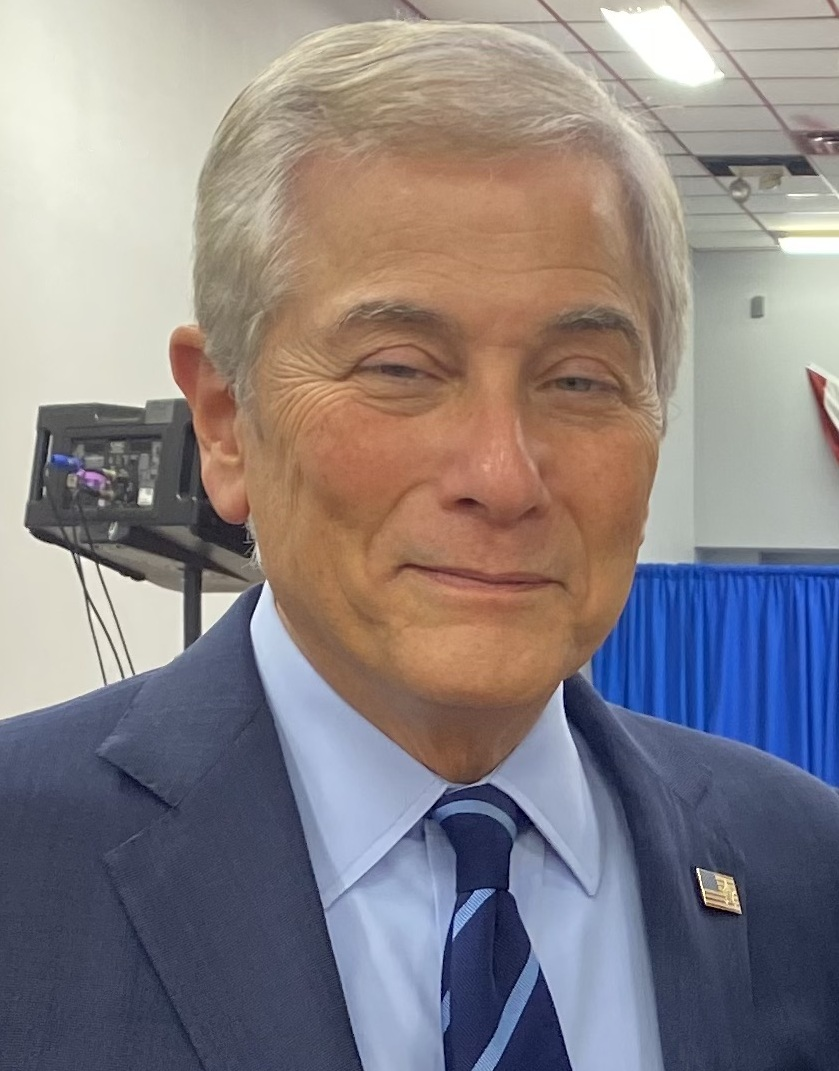
Nominee	George Santos	Robert Zimmerman
Party	Republican	Democratic
Alliance	Conservative	Working Families
Popular vote	145,824	125,404
Percentage	53.7%	46.2%
- Santos: 50–60% 60–70% 70–80% 80–90% 90–100% Zimmerman: 50–60% 60–70% 70–80% 80–90% 90–100% Tie: 50% No results
U.S. Representative before election
Tom Suozzi
Democratic
Elected U.S. Representative
George Santos
Republican

The 3rd district is based on the North Shore of Nassau County, including all of the towns of North Hempstead and Glen Cove, most of the town of Oyster Bay, and a small part of Hempstead, and parts of Northeast Queens, including the neighborhoods of Whitestone, Beechhurst, Little Neck, and Douglaston. Due to redistricting, the district lost Huntington to the 1st district. It had a PVI of D+2 and voted for Joe Biden by 8 points in 2020. The incumbent was Democrat Tom Suozzi, who was reelected with 55.9% of the vote in 2020. Suozzi declined to run for reelection, instead opting to run for governor.

In the general election, Republican George Santos defeated Democrat Robert Zimmerman by 7%, considered an upset in this Democratic-leaning district. On December 19, 2022, The New York Times published an article reporting that Santos had allegedly misrepresented many aspects of his life and career, including his education and employment history. An attorney for Santos said the report was a "smear" and "defamatory" but did not address the report's substance. Santos did not produce any documents to substantiate his claims, despite several requests from the Times to do so. Other news organizations confirmed and elaborated on the Times's reporting. Gerard Kassar, chair of the Conservative Party of New York State, said: "I've never seen anything like this. His entire life seems to be made up. Everything about him is fraudulent."

In the wake of the disclosures about Santos, commentators expressed amazement that no one, save the local North Shore Leader and opposition research by the Democratic Congressional Campaign Committee, had raised questions about Santos's background during the campaign. It was speculated that if what the Times reported had been public knowledge before the election, Santos would have lost. However, FiveThirtyEight said that was "unclear", noting that the other two Republican candidates on the ballot district-wide, Lee Zeldin and Joe Pinion, had also carried the district. Zeldin carried the 3rd District by 12 points in the 2022 New York gubernatorial election. Pinion carried the district by 4 points in the 2022 United States Senate election in New York, despite his campaign having been minimally funded. The site has found that pre-election scandals have on average cost candidates about 9 percentage points of the vote that they might otherwise have received, and while that might have been enough to throw the election to Zimmerman, "a scandal's impact varies quite a bit from election to election. So we can't just subtract 9 points from that margin and assume that would have been the result if voters had been aware of his deceptions." Nathaniel Rakich observed that "in this era of high partisan polarization, scandals may hurt candidates less than they used to."

=== Democratic nominee ===
- Robert Zimmerman, Democratic National Committee member and communications professional

==== Eliminated in primary ====
- Melanie D'Arrigo, health care consultant and candidate for this district in 2020
- Jon Kaiman, former North Hempstead supervisor, former chairman of the Nassau Interim Finance Authority, and candidate for this district in 2016
- Josh Lafazan, Nassau County legislator for the 18th district
- Reema Rasool, candidate for Oyster Bay Town Council in 2021

==== Withdrawn ====
- Alessandra Biaggi, state senator from the 34th district (2019–present) (unsuccessfully ran in the 17th district)

==== Declined ====
- Thomas Suozzi, incumbent U.S. representative (ran unsuccessfully for Democratic nomination for governor of New York)

==== Endorsements ====
Alessandra Biaggi (withdrawn)

U.S. representatives

- Jamaal Bowman, U.S. representative from New York's 16th congressional district (2021–present)

State legislators

- Jabari Brisport, New York state senator from the 25th district (2021–present)
- Samra Brouk, New York state senator from the 55th district (2021–present)
- Jeremy Cooney, New York state senator from the 56th district (2021–present)
- Andrew Gounardes, New York state senator from the 22nd district (2019–present)
- Peter Harckham, New York state senator from the 40th district (2019–present), former member of the Westchester County Board of Legislators from the 2nd district (2008–2015)
- Brad Hoylman, New York state senator from the 27th district (2013–present), candidate for Manhattan borough president in 2021
- Robert Jackson, New York state senator from the 31st district (2019–present), former New York City Councilmember from the 7th district (2002–2013)
- Rachel May, New York state senator from the 53rd district (2019–present)
- Elijah Reichlin-Melnick, New York state senator from the 38th district (2021–present)
- Gustavo Rivera, New York state senator from the 33rd district (2011–present)
- Julia Salazar, New York state senator from the 18th district (2019–present)
- James Skoufis, New York state senator from the 39th district (2019–present), former New York State Assemblymember from the 99th district (2013–2018)

Local officials

- Brad Lander, New York City Comptroller (2022–present), former New York City Councilmember from the 39th district (2010–2021)
- David Tubiolo, Westchester County legislator (2016–present)
Melanie D'Arrigo

State legislators

- Ron Kim, member of the New York State Assembly for the 40th District (2013–present)
- John Liu, member of the New York State Senate for the 11th district (2019–present)

Local officials

- Melissa Mark-Viverito, former New York City Councilmember from the 8th district (2006–2017), former Speaker of the New York City Council (2014–2017)

Individuals

- Ana Maria Archila, former director of the Center for Popular Democracy, current director of Make the Road New York, and candidate for lieutenant governor in the 2022 New York gubernatorial election
- Nomiki Konst, political commentator and Director of Matriarch PAC
- Cynthia Nixon, actress and candidate in the 2018 New York gubernatorial election
- Zephyr Teachout, Fordham University law professor and former candidate in the 2018 New York Attorney General election
- Marianne Williamson, author and candidate in the 2020 Democratic Party presidential primaries

Organizations

- Brand New Congress
- Everytown for Gun Safety Action Fund
- Friends of the Earth Action
- Indivisible
- National Organization for Women
- New York Communities for Change
- New York Working Families Party
- One Fair Wage
- Our Revolution

Labor unions

- Committee of Interns and Residents
- SEIU New York, New Jersey, and Connecticut branch
- United Auto Workers
Josh Lafazan

U.S. representatives

- Thomas Suozzi, former U.S. representative from New York's 3rd congressional district (2017–2023), former county executive of Nassau County (2002–2009), former mayor of Glen Cove (1994–2001), candidate for governor of New York in 2022 and 2006
Robert Zimmerman

Federal officials

- Hillary Clinton, United States Secretary of State (2009–2013), U.S. senator from New York (2001–2009), First Lady of the United States (1993–2001)

U.S. representatives

- Gary Ackerman, former U.S. representative from New York's 7th congressional district (1993–2013), former U.S. representative from New York's 5th congressional district (1983–1993), former New York state senator from the 12th district (1979–1983)
- Steve Israel, chair of the Democratic Congressional Campaign Committee (2011–2015), former U.S. representative from New York's 3rd congressional district (2013–2017), former U.S. representative from New York's 2nd congressional district (2001–2013)
- Carolyn Maloney, former chair of the House Oversight Committee (2019–2023), former vice chair of the Joint Economic Committee (2019–2020), former U.S. representative from New York's 12th congressional district (2013–2023), former U.S. representative from New York's 14th congressional district (1993–2013), former New York City Councilmember from the 4th district (1992–1993), former New York City Councilmember from the 8th district (1991–1983)
- Gregory Meeks, chair of the House Foreign Affairs Committee (2021–present), chair of the Queens Democratic Party (2019–present), U.S. representative from New York's 5th congressional district (2013–present), former U.S. representative from New York's 6th congressional district (1998–2013), former New York State Assemblymember from the 31st district (1993–1998)
- Grace Meng, U.S. representative from New York's 6th congressional district (2013–present), former vice chair of the Democratic National Committee (2017–2021), former New York State Assembly member from the 22nd district (2009–2012)
- Ritchie Torres, U.S. representative from New York's 15th congressional district (2021–present), former New York City Councilmember from the 15th district (2014–2020)

State officials

- Thomas DiNapoli, New York State Comptroller (2007–present), former New York State Assemblymember from the 16th district (1987–2007)

State legislators

- Charles Lavine, New York State Assembly member from the 13th district (2005–present)

Local officials

- Ruben Diaz Jr., former Bronx borough president (2009–2021), former New York State Assembly member from the 85th district (2003–2009), former New York State Assembly member from the 75th district (1997–2002)
- Corey Johnson, former Speaker of the New York City Council (2018–2021), former New York City Council member from the 3rd district (2014–2021), former acting New York City Public Advocate (2019), candidate for New York City Comptroller in 2021
- Christine Quinn, former Speaker of the New York City Council (2006–2013), former New York City Council member from the 3rd district (1999–2013), candidate for mayor of New York in 2013, CEO of Women in Need (WIN)

Individuals

- Hazel Nell Dukes, former president of the NAACP

Organizations

- League of Conservation Voters
- LGBTQ Victory Fund
- Sierra Club
- Stonewall Democratic Club of New York City

Labor unions

- New York State United Teachers

==== Debate and forum ====
2022 New York's 3rd congressional district Democratic primary debate & candidate forum
No.	Date	Host	Moderator	Link	Democratic	Democratic	Democratic	Democratic	Democratic
Key: P Participant A Absent N Not invited I Invited W Withdrawn									
Key: P Participant A Absent N Not invited I Invited W Withdrawn					Melanie D'Arrigo	John Kaiman	Josh Lafazan	Reema Rasool	Robert Zimmerman
1	Aug. 5, 2022	Schneps Media	Robert Pozarycki; Stephen Witt		P	P	P	N	P
2	Aug. 11, 2022	Leagues of Women Voters of Great Neck, NYC, East; Nassau & Port Washington-Manhasset	Nancy Rosenthal		P	P	P	P	P

==== Polling ====
Poll source	Date(s) administered	Sample size	Margin of error	Melanie D'Arrigo	Jon Kaiman	Josh Lafazan	Reema Rasool	Robert Zimmerman	Undecided
Global Strategy Group (D) (Note: This poll was sponsored by Zimmerman's campaign.)	July 20–24, 2022	400 (LV)	± 4.9%	12%	13%	10%	1%	17%	48%
The Mellman Group (D) (Note: This poll was sponsored by Lafazan's campaign.)	June 12–16, 2022	400 (LV)	± 4.9%	4%	20%	20%	4%	10%	43%

==== Primary results ====
Democratic primary results
Party	Candidate	Votes	%
Democratic	Robert Zimmerman	9,482	35.8
Democratic	Jon Kaiman	6,884	26.0
Democratic	Josh Lafazan	5,296	20.0
Democratic	Melanie D'Arrigo	4,197	15.8
Democratic	Reema Rasool	661	2.5
Total votes		26,520	100.0

=== Republican primary ===
==== Nominee ====
- George Santos, former call center employee, and nominee for this district in 2020

==== Endorsements ====
George Santos

Organizations

- New York Young Republican Club

City elected officials

- Robert F. Holden, New York City Council member (2018–present) (Democratic)

=== General election ===
==== Debate ====
2022 New York's 3rd congressional district debate
No.	Date	Host	Moderator	Link	Republican	Democratic
Key: P Participant A Absent N Not invited I Invited W Withdrawn						
Key: P Participant A Absent N Not invited I Invited W Withdrawn					George Santos	Robert Zimmerman
1	Oct. 21, 2022	League of Women Voters of Port Washington-Manhasset; Women's Group at the Unitarian Universalist; Congregation at Shelter Rock	Lisa Scott		P	P

==== Predictions ====
Source	Ranking	As of
The Cook Political Report	Tossup	November 1, 2022
Inside Elections	Tilt D	October 21, 2022
Sabato's Crystal Ball	Lean R (flip)	November 7, 2022
Politico	Lean D	May 27, 2022
RCP	Tossup	June 9, 2022
Fox News	Tossup	July 11, 2022
DDHQ	Lean D	August 10, 2022
FiveThirtyEight	Lean D	September 30, 2022
The Economist	Lean D	September 28, 2022

==== Polling ====
Poll source	Date(s) administered	Sample size	Margin of error	Robert Zimmerman (D)	George Santos (R)	Other	Undecided
RMG Research	August 27 – September 2, 2022	400 (LV)	± 4.9%	42%	41%	4%	14%

Hypothetical polling

Josh Lafazan vs. George Santos vs. Melanie D'Arrigo

Poll source	Date(s) administered	Sample size	Margin of error	Josh Lafazan (D)	George Santos (R)	Melanie D'Arrigo (WFP)	Undecided
co/efficient (R) (Note: This poll was sponsored by Santos's campaign.)	July 11–12, 2022	714 (LV)	± 3.7%	33%	44%	8%	15%

==== Post-primary endorsements ====
George Santos

Labor unions

- N.Y.C. District Council of Carpenters

Newspapers

- New York Post

==== Results ====
New York's 3rd congressional district, 2022
Party	Candidate	Votes	%
Republican	George Santos	133,859	49.3
Conservative	George Santos	11,965	4.4
Total	George Santos	145,824	53.7
Democratic	Robert Zimmerman	120,045	44.2
Working Families	Robert Zimmerman	5,359	2.0
Total	Robert Zimmerman	125,404	46.2
Write-in		103	0.0
Total votes		271,331	100.0
Republican gain from Democratic			

== District 4 ==
2022 New York's 4th congressional district election
- November 8, 2022
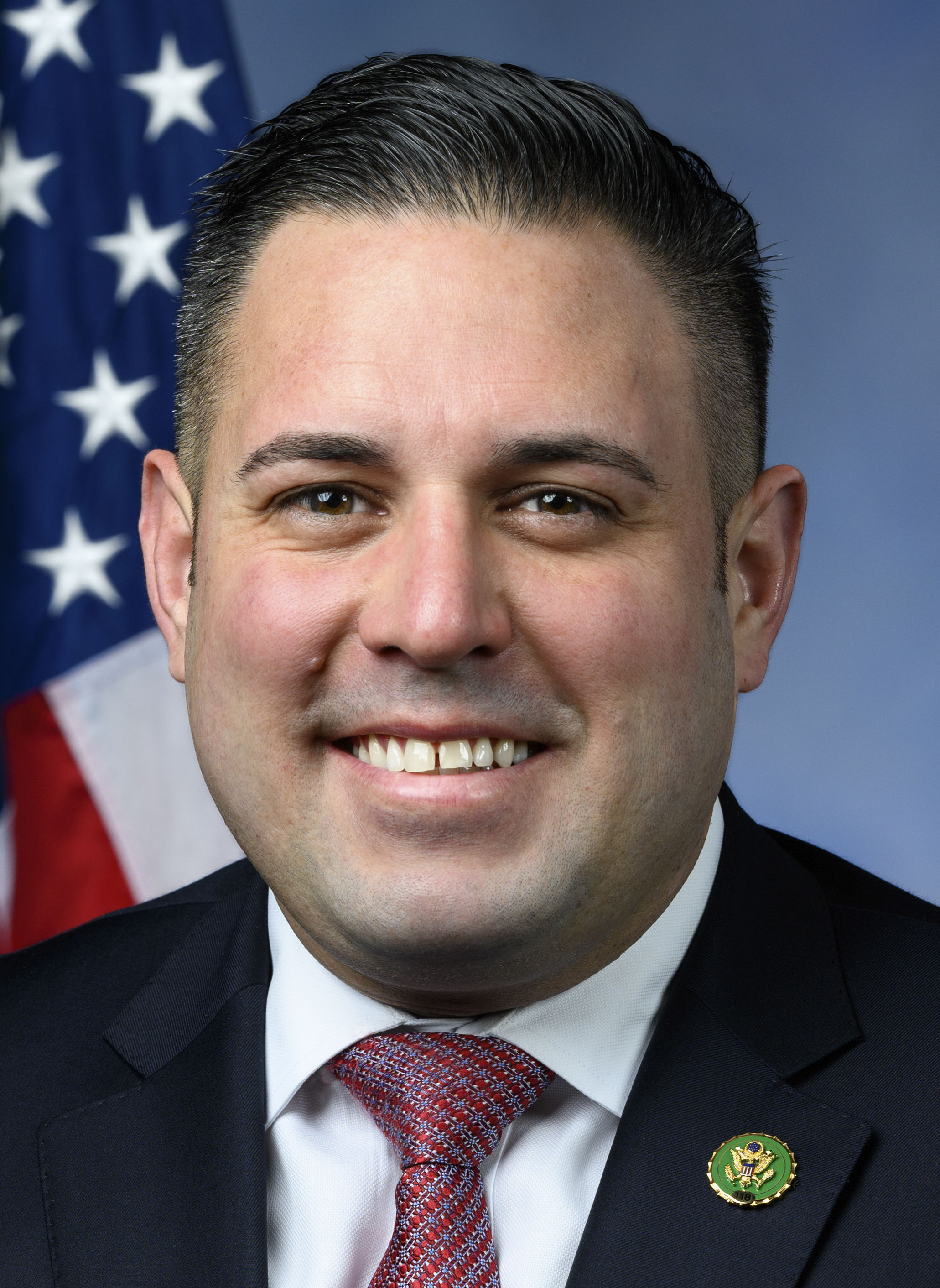

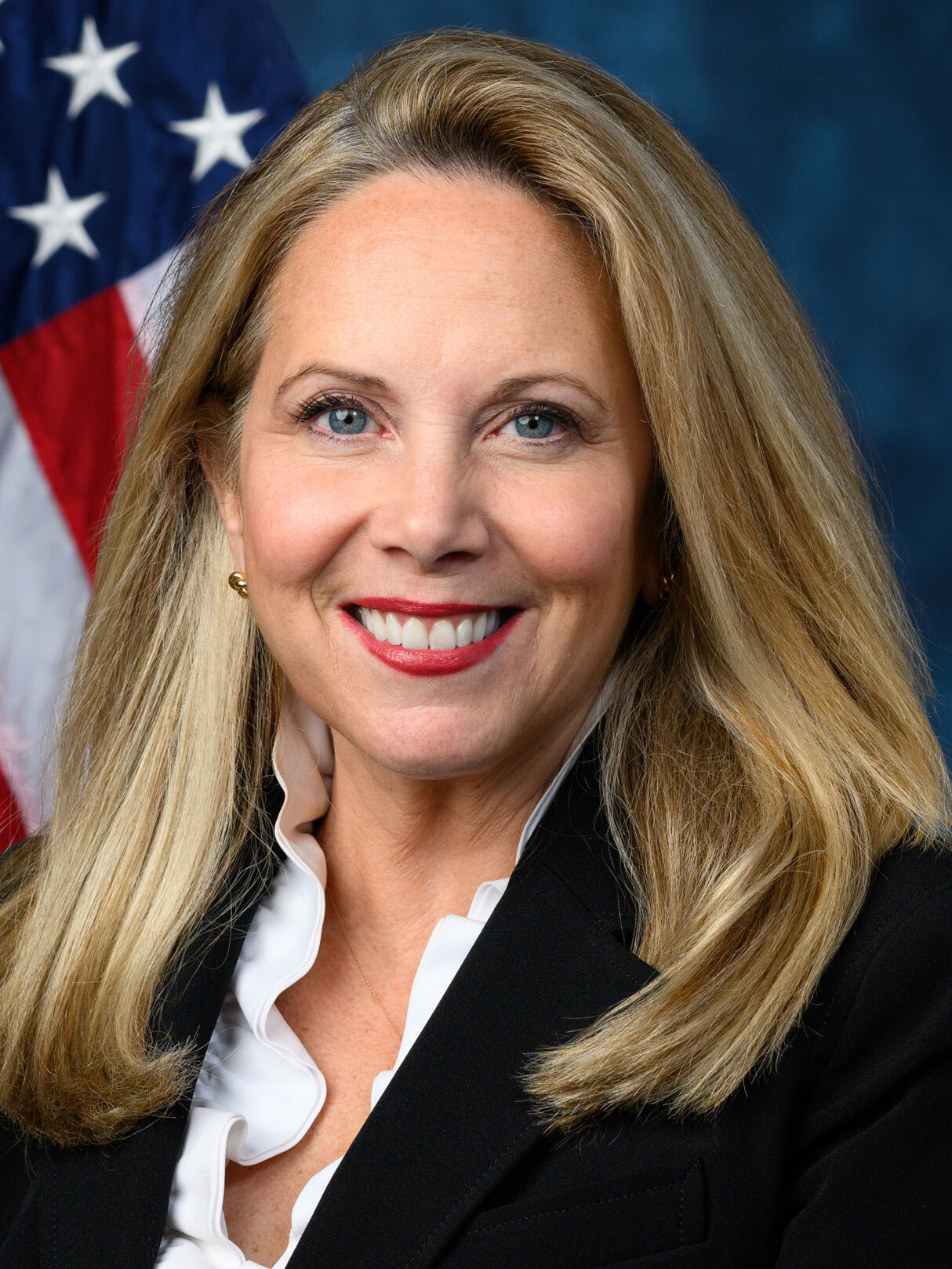
Nominee	Anthony D'Esposito	Laura Gillen
Party	Republican	Democratic
Alliance	Conservative
Popular vote	140,622	130,871
Percentage	51.8%	48.2%
- D'Esposito: 50–60% 60–70% 70–80% 80–90% 90–100% Gillen: 50–60% 60–70% 70–80% 80–90% 90–100% Tie: 50% No results
U.S. Representative before election
Kathleen Rice
Democratic
Elected U.S. Representative
Anthony D'Esposito
Republican

The 4th district is based on the South Shore of Nassau County and is entirely within the town of Hempstead. The district was mostly unchanged by redistricting. It had a PVI of D+5 and voted for Joe Biden by 15 points in 2020. The incumbent was Democrat Kathleen Rice, who was reelected with 56.1% of the vote in 2020. On February 15, 2022, Rice announced that she would retire at the end of her term.

=== Democratic primary ===
==== Candidates ====
===== Nominee =====
- Laura Gillen, former town supervisor of Hempstead (2018–2019)

===== Eliminated in primary =====
- Keith Corbett, mayor of Malverne
- Muzibul Huq, physician and surgeon
- Carrié Solages, member of the Nassau County Legislature (2012–present)

===== Did not make the ballot =====
- Jason Abelove, former Democratic candidate for Hempstead Town Supervisor (2021)
- Kevin Shakil, founder of America's Islamic Radio

===== Withdrawn =====
- Siela Bynoe, member of the Nassau County Legislature

===== Declined =====
- Todd Kaminsky, New York state senator from the 9th district (2016–present), former New York State Assemblymember from the 20th district (2015–2016), candidate for Nassau County District Attorney in 2021
- Kathleen Rice, incumbent U.S. representative (endorsed Gillen)

==== Endorsements ====
Siela Bynoe (withdrew)

State legislators

- Charles Lavine, state assemblyman from the 13th district

Labor unions

- SEIU Local 1199
Laura Gillen

U.S. representatives

- Steve Israel, former chair of the Democratic Congressional Campaign Committee (2011–2015), former U.S. representative from New York's 3rd congressional district (2013–2017), former U.S. representative from New York's 2nd congressional district (2001–2013)

Organizations

- League of Conservation Voters
- Sierra Club

==== Debate ====
2022 New York's 4th congressional district Democratic primary debate
No.	Date	Host	Moderator	Link	Democratic	Democratic	Democratic	Democratic
Key: P Participant A Absent N Not invited I Invited W Withdrawn								
Key: P Participant A Absent N Not invited I Invited W Withdrawn					Keith Corbett	Laura Gillen	Muzibul Huq	Carrié Solages
1	Aug. 1, 2022	Schneps Media	Jane Hanson; Stephen Witt		P	N	P	P

==== Polling ====
Poll source	Date(s) administered	Sample size	Margin of error	Siela Bynoe	Keith Corbett	Laura Gillen	Carrié Solages	Undecided
Impact Research (D) (Note: This poll was sponsored by Gillen's campaign.)	August 2–8, 2022	244 (LV)	± 6.3%	–	5%	47%	10%	39%
Impact Research (D)	March 28 – April 3, 2022	400 (LV)	± 4.9%	9%	4%	40%	11%	36%

==== Primary results ====
Democratic primary results
Party	Candidate	Votes	%
Democratic	Laura Gillen	12,432	63.1
Democratic	Carrié Solages	4,811	24.4
Democratic	Keith Corbett	2,169	11.0
Democratic	Muzibul Huq	297	1.5
Total votes		19,784	100.0

=== Republican/Conservative nominee ===
- Anthony D'Esposito, retired NYPD detective and Hempstead Town Board member

==== Disqualified ====
- Bill Staniford, veteran and CEO of PropertyShark

==== Endorsements ====
Anthony D'Esposito

Organizations

- New York Young Republican Club
- United States Chamber of Commerce (post-primary)

Newspapers

- New York Post (post-primary)

=== General election ===
==== Predictions ====
Source	Ranking	As of
The Cook Political Report	Tossup	November 1, 2022
Inside Elections	Tilt D	November 3, 2022
Sabato's Crystal Ball	Lean D	October 19, 2022
Politico	Tossup	November 3, 2022
RCP	Tossup	June 9, 2022
Fox News	Tossup	November 1, 2022
DDHQ	Lean D	October 20, 2022
FiveThirtyEight	Likely D	June 30, 2022
The Economist	Likely D	September 28, 2022

==== Polling ====
Poll source	Date(s) administered	Sample size	Margin of error	Laura Gillen (D)	Anthony D'Esposito (R)	Undecided
McLaughlin & Associates (R) (Note: This poll was sponsored by D'Esposito's campaign.)	March 3–6, 2022	300 (LV)	± 5.7%	36%	48%	16%

Hypothetical polling

Generic Democrat vs. generic Republican

Poll source	Date(s) administered	Sample size	Margin of error	Generic Democrat	Generic Republican	Undecided
McLaughlin & Associates (R)	March 3–6, 2022	300 (LV)	± 5.7%	33%	55%	12%

==== Results ====
New York's 4th congressional district, 2022
Party	Candidate	Votes	%
Republican	Anthony D'Esposito	129,353	47.6
Conservative	Anthony D'Esposito	11,269	4.2
Total	Anthony D'Esposito	140,622	51.8
Democratic	Laura Gillen	130,871	48.2
Write-in		67	0.0
Total votes		271,560	100.0
Republican gain from Democratic			

== District 5 ==
2022 New York's 5th congressional district election
- November 8, 2022
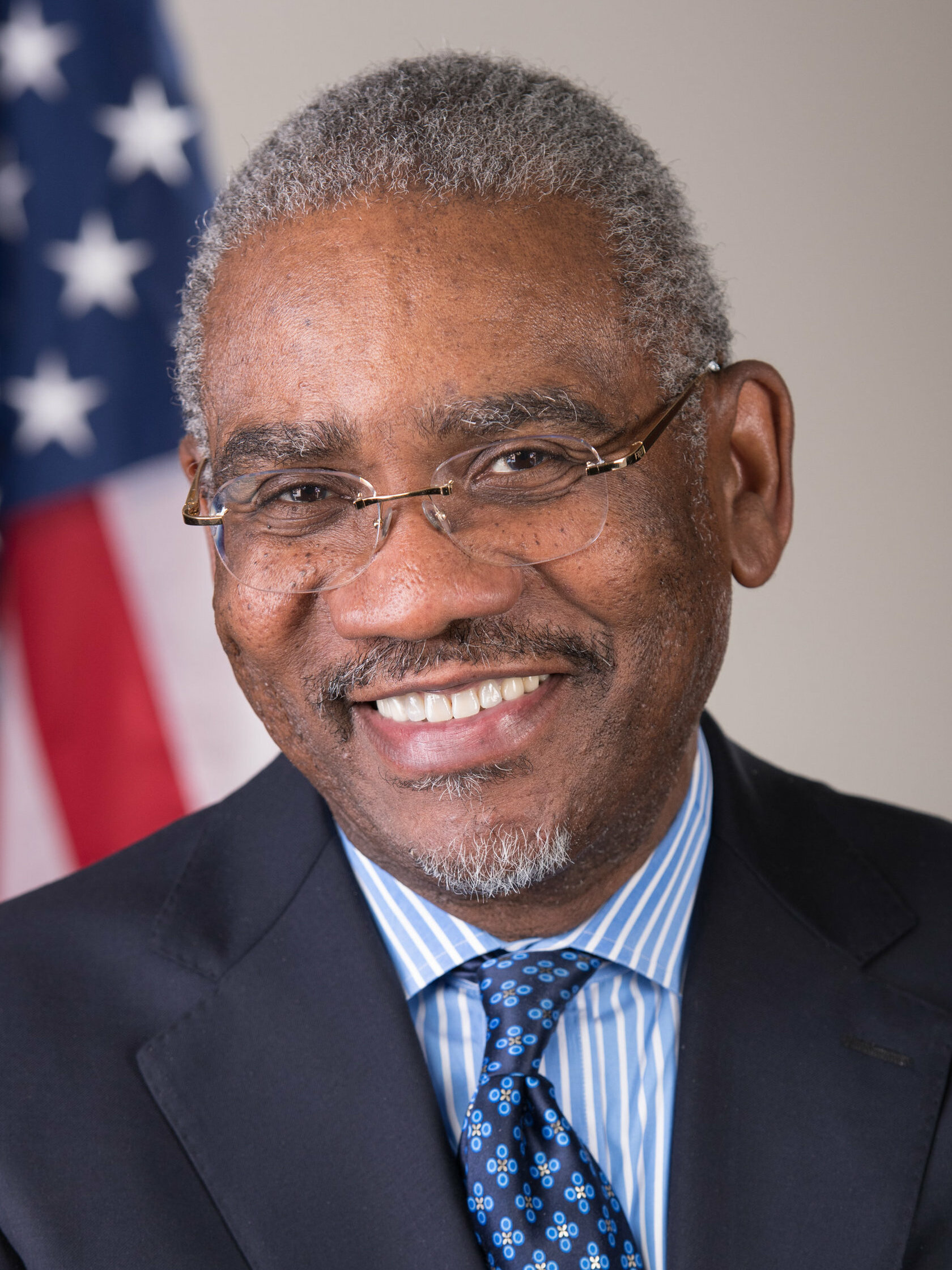

Nominee	Gregory Meeks	Paul King
Party	Democratic	Republican
Alliance		Conservative
Popular vote	104,396	34,407
Percentage	75.1%	24.8%
- Meeks: 50–60% 60–70% 70–80% 80–90% 90–100% King: 40–50% 50–60% 60–70% 70–80% 80–90% No results
U.S. Representative before election
Gregory Meeks
Democratic
Elected U.S. Representative
Gregory Meeks
Democratic

The 5th district is based in Southeast Queens, including the neighborhoods of Jamaica, Hollis, Laurelton, Richmond Hill, Ozone Park, Howard Beach, and the Rockaways. The district was mostly unchanged by redistricting. It had a PVI of D+32 and voted for Joe Biden by 63 points in 2020. The incumbent was Democrat Gregory Meeks, who was reelected unopposed with 99.3% of the vote in 2020.

=== Democratic nominee ===
- Gregory Meeks, incumbent U.S. representative

==== Withdrawn ====
- Frankie Lozada

==== Endorsements ====
Gregory Meeks

Organizations

- Pro-Israel America
- Sierra Club

Labor unions

- District Council 37

=== Republican nominee ===
- Paul King, businessman

==== Endorsements ====
Paul King

U.S. representatives

- Peter T. King, former U.S. representative from New York's 2nd congressional district (2013–2021), former U.S. represenrative from New York's 3rd congressional district (1993–2013), former comptroller of Nassau County, New York (1982–1993)

Local officials

- Joann Ariola, New York City Councilmember from the 32nd district (2022–present), former chair of the Queens County Republican Party (2017–2022)

Individuals

- Michael O'Reilly, former candidate for this district in 2016, former candidate for New York City Public Advocate in 2017 (Conservative)

=== General election ===
==== Predictions ====
Source	Ranking	As of
The Cook Political Report	Solid D	May 23, 2022
Inside Elections	Solid D	May 25, 2022
Sabato's Crystal Ball	Safe D	May 25, 2022
Politico	Solid D	May 27, 2022
RCP	Safe D	June 9, 2022
Fox News	Solid D	July 11, 2022
DDHQ	Solid D	July 20, 2022
FiveThirtyEight	Solid D	June 30, 2022
The Economist	Safe D	September 28, 2022

==== Results ====
New York's 5th congressional district, 2022
Party	Candidate	Votes	%
Democratic	Gregory Meeks (incumbent)	104,396	75.1
Republican	Paul King	31,405	22.6
Conservative	Paul King	3,002	2.2
Total	Paul King	34,407	24.8
Write-in		184	0.1
Total votes		138,987	100.0
Democratic hold			

== District 6 ==
2022 New York's 6th congressional district election
- November 8, 2022
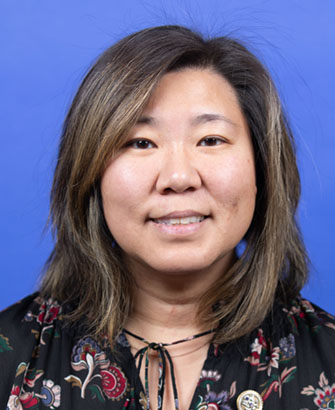

Nominee	Grace Meng	Tom Zmich
Party	Democratic	Republican
Alliance		Conservative; Medical Freedom
Popular vote	85,049	47,935
Percentage	63.9%	36.0%
- Precinct results Meng: 50–60% 60–70% 70–80% 80–90% Zmich: 50–60% 60–70% 70–80% Tie: 50% No results
U.S. Representative before election
Grace Meng
Democratic
Elected U.S. Representative
Grace Meng
Democratic

The 6th district is based in Central and Eastern Queens, including the neighborhoods of Woodside, Jackson Heights, Elmhurst, Kew Gardens, Flushing, Bayside, and Fresh Meadows. The district was mostly unchanged by redistricting. It had a PVI of D+17 and voted for Joe Biden by 31 points in 2020. The incumbent was Democrat Grace Meng, who was reelected with 67.9% of the vote in 2020.

=== Democratic nominee ===
- Grace Meng, incumbent U.S. representative

==== Endorsements ====
Grace Meng

Organizations

- Feminist Majority PAC
- New York League of Conservation Voters
- Pro-Israel America
- Sierra Club

Labor unions

- District Council 37

=== Republican nominee ===
- Tom Zmich, U.S. Army veteran, nominee for Queens borough president in 2021, nominee for this district in 2020

=== General election ===
==== Predictions ====
Source	Ranking	As of
The Cook Political Report	Solid D	May 23, 2022
Inside Elections	Solid D	May 25, 2022
Sabato's Crystal Ball	Safe D	May 25, 2022
Politico	Solid D	May 27, 2022
RCP	Safe D	June 9, 2022
Fox News	Solid D	July 11, 2022
DDHQ	Solid D	July 20, 2022
FiveThirtyEight	Solid D	June 30, 2022
The Economist	Safe D	September 28, 2022

==== Results ====
New York's 6th congressional district, 2022
Party	Candidate	Votes	%
Democratic	Grace Meng (incumbent)	85,049	63.9
Republican	Tom Zmich	44,264	33.3
Conservative	Tom Zmich	3,240	2.4
Medical Freedom Party	Tom Zmich	431	0.3
Total	Tom Zmich	47,935	36.0
Write-in		130	0.1
Total votes		133,114	100.0
Democratic hold			

== District 7 ==
2022 New York's 7th congressional district election
- November 8, 2022
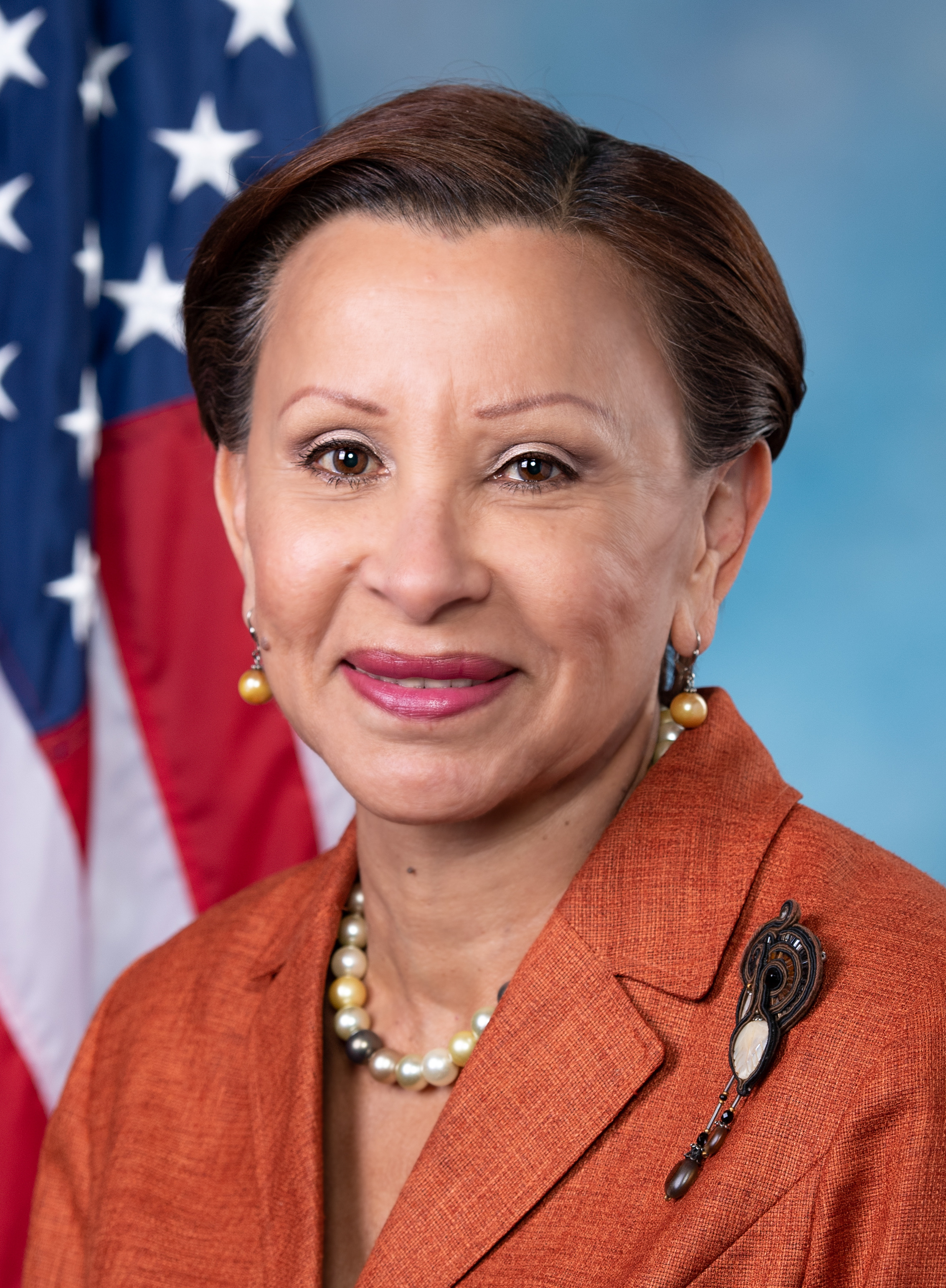

Nominee	Nydia Velázquez	Juan Pagan
Party	Democratic	Republican
Alliance	Working Families	Conservative
Popular vote	119,473	28,597
Percentage	80.6%	19.3%
- Precinct results Velázquez: 50–60% 60–70% 70–80% 80–90% 90–100% Pagan: 50–60% 60–70% 70–80% 90–100% Tie: 50% No results
U.S. Representative before election
Nydia Velázquez
Democratic
Elected U.S. Representative
Nydia Velázquez
Democratic

The 7th district is based in parts of Brooklyn and Queens, including the neighborhoods of Clinton Hill, Williamsburg, Greenpoint, Bushwick, Woodhaven, Fresh Pond, Maspeth, Sunnyside, and Long Island City. The seat was significantly altered due to redistricting, losing all of its previous territory in Manhattan and South Brooklyn in exchange for parts of Queens formerly in the 12th district. The district had a PVI of D+32 and voted for Joe Biden by 60 points in 2020. The incumbent was Democrat Nydia Velázquez, who was re-elected with 84.8% of the vote in 2020.

=== Democratic primary ===
Nominal challenger Paperboy Prince became notable for both their flamboyant 2021 run for New York City mayor, and their attempt to get on the ballots in 11 congressional districts simultaneously. They only succeeded in this one.

==== Candidates ====
===== Nominee =====
- Nydia Velázquez, incumbent U.S. representative

===== Eliminated in primary =====
- Paperboy Prince, artist and community activist

==== Endorsements ====
Nydia Velázquez

Organizations

- Feminist Majority PAC
- Sierra Club
- Stonewall Democratic Club of New York City
- Working Families Party

Labor unions

- District Council 37

==== Primary results ====
Democratic primary results
Party	Candidate	Votes	%
Democratic	Nydia Velázquez (incumbent)	21,470	84.3
Democratic	Paperboy Prince	4,006	15.7
Total votes		25,476	100.0

=== Republican/Conservative nominee ===
- Juan Pagan

=== Endorsements ===
Endorsements

Individuals

- Mike Zumbluskas, nominee for New York's 12th congressional district in 2022

=== General election ===
==== Predictions ====
Source	Ranking	As of
The Cook Political Report	Solid D	May 23, 2022
Inside Elections	Solid D	May 25, 2022
Sabato's Crystal Ball	Safe D	May 25, 2022
Politico	Solid D	May 27, 2022
RCP	Safe D	June 9, 2022
Fox News	Solid D	July 11, 2022
DDHQ	Solid D	July 20, 2022
FiveThirtyEight	Solid D	June 30, 2022
The Economist	Safe D	September 28, 2022

==== Results ====
New York's 7th congressional district, 2022
Party	Candidate	Votes	%
Democratic	Nydia Velázquez	95,645	64.5
Working Families	Nydia Velázquez	23,828	16.1
Total	Nydia Velázquez (incumbent)	119,473	80.6
Republican	Juan Pagan	26,351	17.8
Conservative	Juan Pagan	2,246	1.5
Total	Juan Pagan	28,597	19.3
Write-in		234	0.2
Total votes		148,304	100.0
Democratic hold			

== District 8 ==
2022 New York's 8th congressional district election
- November 8, 2022
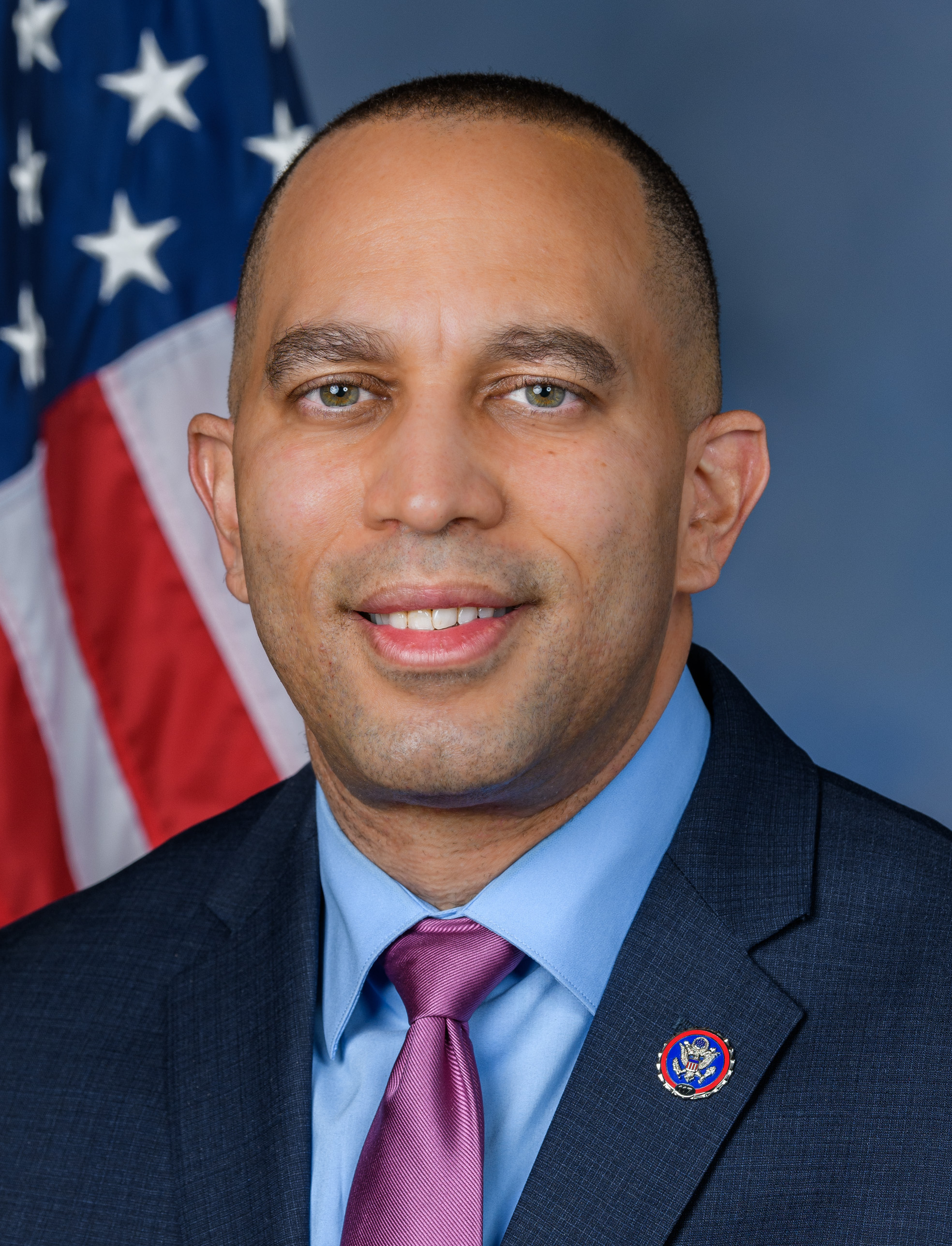

Nominee	Hakeem Jeffries	Yuri Dashevsky
Party	Democratic	Republican
Alliance		Conservative
Popular vote	99,079	39,060
Percentage	71.6%	28.2%
- Precinct results Jeffries: 50–60% 60–70% 70–80% 80–90% 90–100% Dashevsky: 50–60% 60–70% 70–80% 80–90% 90–100% No results
U.S. Representative before election
Hakeem Jeffries
Democratic
Elected U.S. Representative
Hakeem Jeffries
Democratic

The 8th district is based in Southern and Eastern Brooklyn, including the neighborhoods of Bed-Stuy, Brownsville, East New York, Canarsie, Bergen Beach, Sheepshead Bay, Gravesend, and Coney Island. The district was mostly unchanged by redistricting. It had a PVI of D+25 and voted for Joe Biden by 49 points in 2020. The incumbent was Democrat Hakeem Jeffries, who was reelected with 84.8% of the vote in 2020.

=== Democratic primary ===
==== Candidates ====
===== Nominee =====
- Hakeem Jeffries, incumbent U.S. representative and chair of the House Democratic Caucus

===== Eliminated in primary =====
- Queen Johnson, activist and nonprofit co-founder

==== Endorsements ====
Hakeem Jeffries

Organizations

- End Citizens United
- Giffords
- League of Conservation Voters
- NARAL Pro-Choice America
- Natural Resources Defense Council
- New York League of Conservation Voters
- Sierra Club
- Stonewall Democratic Club of New York City

Labor unions

- District Council 37
- New York State United Teachers
Queen Johnson

Individuals

- Marianne Williamson, author and candidate for President of the United States in 2020

==== Primary results ====
Democratic primary results
Party	Candidate	Votes	%
Democratic	Hakeem Jeffries (incumbent)	22,196	87.4
Democratic	Queen Johnson	3,214	12.6
Total votes		25,410	100.0

=== Republican nominee ===
- Yuri Dashevsky

=== Forward Party ===
- Brian Mannix, social studies teacher

=== General election ===
==== Predictions ====
Source	Ranking	As of
The Cook Political Report	Solid D	May 23, 2022
Inside Elections	Solid D	May 25, 2022
Sabato's Crystal Ball	Safe D	May 25, 2022
Politico	Solid D	May 27, 2022
RCP	Safe D	June 9, 2022
Fox News	Solid D	July 11, 2022
DDHQ	Solid D	July 20, 2022
FiveThirtyEight	Solid D	June 30, 2022
The Economist	Safe D	September 28, 2022

==== Results ====
New York's 8th congressional district, 2022
Party	Candidate	Votes	%
Democratic	Hakeem Jeffries (incumbent)	99,079	71.6
Republican	Yuri Dashevsky	36,776	26.6
Conservative	Yuri Dashevsky	2,284	1.6
Total	Yuri Dashevsky	39,060	28.2
Write-in		191	0.1
Total votes		138,330	100.0
Democratic hold			

== District 9 ==
2022 New York's 9th congressional district election
- November 8, 2022
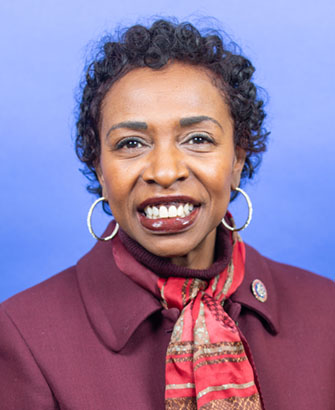

Nominee	Yvette Clarke	Menachem Raitport
Party	Democratic	Conservative
Alliance	Working Families
Popular vote	116,970	26,521
Percentage	81.3%	18.4%
- Precinct results Clarke: 50–60% 60–70% 70–80% 80–90% 90–100% Raitport: 50–60% 60–70% 70–80% 80–90% No results
U.S. Representative before election
Yvette Clarke
Democratic
Elected U.S. Representative
Yvette Clarke
Democratic

The 9th district is based in South and Central Brooklyn, including the neighborhoods of Prospect Heights, Crown Heights, Midwood, and Borough Park. The district was mostly unchanged by redistricting. It had a PVI of D+27 and voted for Joe Biden by 52 points in 2020. The incumbent was Democrat Yvette Clarke, who was reelected with 83% of the vote in 2020.

=== Democratic nominee ===
- Yvette Clarke, incumbent U.S. representative

==== Endorsements ====
Yvette Clarke

Organizations

- Feminist Majority PAC
- New York Working Families Party
- Sierra Club

Labor unions

- 1199SEIU United Healthcare Workers East
- District Council 37

==== Disqualified ====
- Isiah James, veteran, community organizer, and candidate for this seat in 2020

=== Republican primary ===
==== Disqualified ====
- Menachem Raitport, nominee for Brooklyn borough president in 2021

=== General election ===
==== Predictions ====
Source	Ranking	As of
The Cook Political Report	Solid D	May 23, 2022
Inside Elections	Solid D	May 25, 2022
Sabato's Crystal Ball	Safe D	May 25, 2022
Politico	Solid D	May 27, 2022
RCP	Safe D	June 9, 2022
Fox News	Solid D	July 11, 2022
DDHQ	Solid D	July 20, 2022
FiveThirtyEight	Solid D	June 30, 2022
The Economist	Safe D	September 28, 2022

==== Results ====
New York's 9th congressional district, 2022
Party	Candidate	Votes	%
Democratic	Yvette Clarke	99,771	69.4
Working Families	Yvette Clarke	17,199	12.0
Total	Yvette Clarke (incumbent)	116,970	81.3
Conservative	Menachem Raitport	26,521	18.5
Write-in		362	0.2
Total votes		143,853	100.0
Democratic hold			

== District 10 ==
2022 New York's 10th congressional district election
- November 8, 2022
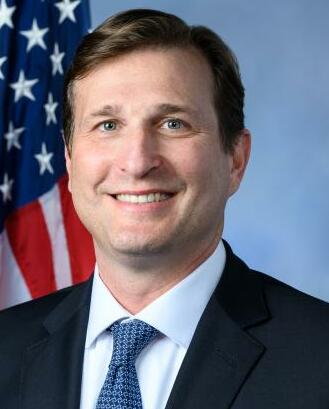

Nominee	Dan Goldman	Benine Hamdan
Party	Democratic	Republican
Alliance		Conservative
Popular vote	160,582	29,058
Percentage	83.5%	15.1%
- Precinct results Goldman: 40–50% 50–60% 60–70% 70–80% 80–90% 90–100% Hamdan: 50–60% 60–70% 70–80% Tie: 40–50% No results
U.S. Representative before election
None
(Redistricting)
Elected U.S. Representative
Dan Goldman
Democratic

The newly-drawn 10th district was based in Lower Manhattan and Brownstone Brooklyn, including the neighborhoods of Park Slope, Windsor Terrace, Gowanus, Brooklyn Heights, Cobble Hill, Red Hook, Sunset Park, the Lower East Side, Greenwich Village, and the Financial District. The district was significantly altered due to redistricting, resembling the previous 10th very little. It had a PVI of D+36 and voted for Joe Biden by 71 points in 2020. Rep. Mondaire Jones, the incumbent from the Rockland and Westchester-based 17th district, was defeated by attorney Dan Goldman in the Democratic primary. Goldman went on to win the general election by a wide margin.

=== Democratic primary ===
A last-minute, court-ordered redistricting turned what was a nominal race between safe incumbent Jerry Nadler and two non-notable challengers into a free-for-all of 13 candidates, several of whom were notable.

==== On the ballot ====
===== Nominee =====
- Dan Goldman, former assistant U.S. attorney for the Southern District of New York (2007–2017), former general counsel for the U.S. House Intelligence Committee (2019–2020), candidate for attorney general of New York in 2022

===== Eliminated in primary =====
- Quanda Francis, data scientist
- Peter Gleason
- Elizabeth Holtzman, former New York City Comptroller (1990–1993), former Brooklyn District Attorney (1982–1989), former U.S. representative from New York's 16th congressional district (1973–1981), nominee for U.S. Senate in 1980, candidate for U.S. Senate in 1992
- Mondaire Jones, incumbent U.S. representative from the New York's 17th congressional district
- Jimmy Li, podiatrist, former member of Brooklyn Community Board 7, and former president of the New York City Asian-American Democratic Club
- Maud Maron, lawyer
- Yuh-Line Niou, New York State Assemblymember from the 65th district (2017–present)
- Carlina Rivera, New York City Councilmember from the 2nd district (2018–present)
- Brian Robinson, credit counselor
- Jo Anne Simon, New York State Assemblymember from the 52nd district (2015–present), candidate for Brooklyn borough president in 2021 (also running for reelection due to separate primary dates)
- Yan Xiong, pastor, U.S. Army veteran and dissident involved in the Tiananmen Square protests of 1989

==== Withdrawn ====
- Bill de Blasio, former mayor of New York City (2014–2021), former New York City Public Advocate (2010–2013), former New York City Councilmember from the 39th district (2002–2009)
- Brad Hoylman, New York state senator from the 27th district (2013–present) and candidate for Manhattan borough president in 2021 (endorsed Goldman) (running for reelection)
- Elizabeth Kim, business consulting associate
- Jerry Nadler, incumbent U.S. representative (running in the 12th district)
- Ashmi Sheth, former Federal Reserve regulator (unsuccessfully ran in the 12th district)

==== Disqualified ====
- John Herron
- Laura Thomas

==== Declined ====
- Robert Carroll, New York State Assemblymember from the 44th district (2017–present) (endorsed Goldman) (running for reelection)
- Simcha Felder, New York state senator from the 17th district (2013–present), former New York City Councilmember from the 44th district (2002–2010) (running for reelection)
- Kathryn Garcia, director of New York state operations (2021–present), former Commissioner of the New York City Sanitation Department (2014–2018), candidate for mayor of New York in 2021
- Shahana Hanif, New York City Councilmember from the 39th district (2022–present) (endorsed Niou)
- Corey Johnson, former Speaker of the New York City Council (2018–2021), former New York City Councilmember from the 3rd district (2014–2021), former acting New York City Public Advocate (2019), candidate for New York City Comptroller in 2021
- Brad Lander, New York City Comptroller (2022–present), former New York City Councilmember from the 39th district (2010–2021)
- Lincoln Restler, New York City Councilmember from the 33rd district (2022–present) (endorsed Rivera)
- Max Rose, former U.S. representative from the 11th district (2019–2021) (running in the 11th district)
- Dawn Smalls, attorney and candidate for New York City Public Advocate in 2019
- Scott Stringer, former New York City Comptroller (2014–2021), former borough president of Manhattan (2006–2013), former New York State Assemblymember from the 67th district (1993–2005), candidate for mayor of New York City in 2021
- Nydia Velázquez, incumbent U.S. representative from New York's 7th congressional district (endorsed Rivera) (running in the 7th district)
- Anthony Weiner, former U.S. representative from New York's 9th congressional district (1999–2011), former New York City Councilmember from the 48th district (1992–1998), and candidate for mayor of New York City in 2005 and 2013
- Brandon West, Office of Management and Budget worker, candidate for New York City's 39th City Council district in 2021
- David Yassky, former dean of Pace University School of Law (2014–2018), former New York City Councilmember from the 33rd district (2002–2009), candidate for New York's 11th congressional district in 2006, candidate for New York City Comptroller in 2009 (running for State Senate)

==== Endorsements ====
Bill de Blasio (withdrawn)

U.S. representatives

- ~~Ed Towns, former chair of the House Oversight Committee (2009–2011), former U.S. representative from New York's 10th congressional district (1993–2013), former U.S. representative from New York's 11th congressional district (1983–1993)~~ (switched endorsement to Goldman after de Blasio withdrew)

State legislators

- Rodneyse Bichotte Hermelyn, chair of the Brooklyn Democratic Party (2020–present), New York State Assembly member from the 42nd district (2015–present)

Local officials

- ~~Marty Markowitz, former Brooklyn borough president (2002–2014), former New York state senator from the 20th district (1993–2001), former New York state senator from the 21st district (1983–1992), former New York state senator from the 19th district (1979–1982)~~ (switched endorsement to Goldman after de Blasio withdrew)
- ~~Mercedes Narcisse, New York City Council member from the 46th district (2022–present)~~ (switched endorsement to Rivera after de Blasio withdrew)
- Miguel Romero, mayor of San Juan (2021–present), former member of the Puerto Rico Senate (2017–2021), former Chief of Staff of Puerto Rico (2012–2013), former Secretary of Labor and Human Resources of Puerto Rico (2009–2013)

Individuals

- Jeffrey Sachs, economist and former director of The Earth Institute

Labor unions

- UNITE HERE Local 100
Quanda Francis

Individuals

- CL Smooth, rapper
Daniel Goldman

U.S. executive branch officials

- Alexander Vindman, former Director for European Affairs for the United States National Security Council (2018–2020)

U.S. representatives

- Steve Israel, former chair of the House Democratic Policy and Communications Committee (2015–2017), former U.S. representative from the 3rd district (2013–2017), former chair of the Democratic Congressional Campaign Committee (2011–2015), former U.S. representative from the 2nd district (2001–2013)
- Ed Towns, former chair of the House Oversight Committee (2009–2011), former U.S. representative from New York's 10th congressional district (1993–2013), former U.S. representative from New York's 10th congressional district (1983–1993) (previously endorsed de Blasio)

State officials

- Kathryn Freed, former justice of the New York Supreme Court (2012–2021), former judge of the New York City Civil Court (2006–2011), former judge of the New York City Criminal Court (2004–2005), former New York City Council member from the 1st district (1992–2001)
- Richard Ravitch, former lieutenant governor of New York (2009–2010), former chairman of the Metropolitan Transportation Authority (1979–1983), former chairman of the Empire State Development Corporation (1975–1977)

State legislators

- James Brennan, former New York State Assembly member from the 44th district (1985–2016)
- Robert Carroll, New York State Assembly member from the 44th district (2017–present)
- Brian Cunningham, New York State Assembly member from the 43rd district (2022–present) (previously endorsed Niou)
- Simcha Eichenstein, New York State Assembly member from the 48th district (2019–present)
- Eddie Gibbs, New York State Assemblymember from the 68th district (2021–present)
- Brad Hoylman, New York state senator from the 27th district (2013–present) and candidate for Manhattan borough president in 2021

Local officials

- Alan Gerson, former New York City Councilmember from the 1st district (2002–2009)
- Marty Markowitz, former Brooklyn borough president (2002–2014), former New York state senator from the 20th district (1993–2001), former New York state senator from the 21st district (1983–1992), former New York state senator from the 19th district (1979–1982) (previously endorsed de Blasio)

Individuals

- Grace Lee, Democratic nominee for New York's 65th Assembly district in 2022

Organizations

- Belz community leaders
- Bobov community leaders
- Bobov-45 community leaders
- Ger community Leaders
- Klausenburg community leaders
- League of Conservation Voters (post-primary)
- New York League of Conservation Voters (post-primary)
- Satmar community leaders

Labor unions

- Teamsters Local 202

Newspapers

- The New York Times
Elizabeth Holtzman

U.S. senators

- Bill Bradley, U.S. senator from New Jersey (1979–1997)

State legislators

- Thomas Duane, former New York state senator from the New York's 29th State Senate district (1999-2012), former New York City Council member from the 3rd district (1992–1998)

Individuals

- Gloria Steinem, activist and journalist

Organizations

- National Organization for Women NYC

Newspapers

- New York Daily News
Mondaire Jones

U.S. senators

- Cory Booker, U.S. senator from New Jersey (2013–present), former mayor of Newark (2006–2013), former Newark Municipal Councilmember from the Central Ward (1998–2002)
- Ed Markey, U.S. senator from Massachusetts (2013–present), former chair of the House Global Warming Committee (2007–2011), former U.S. Representative from Massachusetts's 5th congressional district (2013), former U.S. representative from Massachusetts's 7th congressional district (1976–2013), former Massachusetts State representative from the 26th Middlesex district (1975–1976), former Massachusetts State representative from the 16th Middlesex district (1973–1975)

U.S. representatives

- Ruben Gallego, U.S. representative from Arizona's 7th congressional district (2015–present), former Arizona State representative from the 27th district (2013–2014), former Arizona state representative from the 16th district (2011–2013)
- Pramila Jayapal, chair of the Congressional Progressive Caucus (2021–present), U.S. representative from Washington's 7th congressional district (2017–present), former Washington state senator from the 37th district (2015–2016)
- Barbara Lee, co-chair of the House Democratic Steering Committee (2019–present), U.S. representative from California's 13th congressional district (2013–present), former U.S. representative from California's 9th congressional district (1998–2013), former California state senator from the 9th district (1996–1998), former California State Assembly member from the 16th district (1992–1996), former California State Assemblymember from the 13th district (1990–1992)
- Ted Lieu, co-chair of the House Democratic Policy and Communications Committee (2019–present), U.S. representative from California's 33rd congressional district (2015–present), former California state senator from the 28th district (2011–2014), former California State Assemblymember from the 53rd district (2005–2010)
- Nancy Pelosi, Speaker of the House (2007–2011, 2019–present), former House Minority Leader (2003–2007, 2011–2019), leader of the House Democratic Caucus (2003–present), former House Minority Whip (2002–2003), U.S. representative from California's 12th congressional district (2013–present), former U.S. representative from California's 8th congressional district (1993–2013), former U.S. representative from California's 5th congressional district (1987–1993), former chair of the California Democratic Party (1981–1983)
- Mark Pocan, U.S. representative from Wisconsin's 2nd congressional district (2013–present), former chair of the Congressional Progressive Caucus (2017–2021), former Wisconsin State Assembly member from the 78th district (1999–2013)
- Jamie Raskin, U.S. representative from Maryland's 8th congressional district (2017–present), former Maryland state senator from the 20th district (2007–2016)

State legislators

- Danny O'Donnell, New York State Assembly member from the 69th district (2003–present)

Individuals

- Ben Jealous, former president and CEO of the NAACP (2008–2013), and nominee for governor of Maryland in 2018

Organizations

- Congressional Black Caucus PAC
- Congressional Progressive Caucus PAC
- Council for a Livable World
- Democracy for America Action
- End Citizens United
- Equality PAC
- Human Rights Campaign
- Let America Vote
- Victory Fund
- ~~Working Families Party~~ (switched endorsement to Niou after Jones left the 17th district)

Labor unions

- Communications Workers of America Local 1180
- National Nurses United
- Retail, Wholesale and Department Store Union
Maud Maron

Individuals

- Buck Angel, transgender activist

Newspapers

- New York Post
Yuh-Line Niou

State legislators

- Jabari Brisport, New York state senator from the 25th district (2021–present)
- Stephanie Chang, member of the Michigan Senate from the 1st district (2019–present), former member of the Michigan House of Representatives from the 6th district (2015–2019)
- ~~Brian Cunningham, New York State Assembly member from the 43rd district (2022–present)~~ (switched endorsement to Goldman after Niou's endorsement of BDS)
- Emily Gallagher, New York State Assembly member from the 50th district (2021–present)
- Ash Kalra, member of the California State Assembly from the 27th district (2016–present)
- Mark Keam, member of the Virginia House of Delegates from the 35th district (2010–present)
- Ron Kim, New York State Assembly member from the 40th district (2013–present), candidate for New York City Public Advocate in 2019
- John Liu, New York state senator from the 11th district (2019–present), former New York City Comptroller (2010–2013), former New York City Councilmember from the 20th district (2002–2009), candidate for mayor of New York City in 2013
- Marcela Mitaynes, New York State Assembly member from the 51st district (2021–present)
- Julia Salazar, New York state senator from the 18th district (2019–present)
- Michaelle Solages, New York State Assemblymember from the 22nd district (2013–present)
- Phara Souffrant Forrest, New York State Assembly member from the 57th district (2021–present)

Local officials

- Tiffany Cabán, New York City Council member from the 22nd district (2022–present) and candidate for Queens District Attorney in 2019
- David Chiu, City Attorney of San Francisco (2021–present), former California State Assemblymember from the 17th district (2014–2021), former President of the San Francisco Board of Supervisors (2009–2014), former member of the San Francisco Board of Supervisors from the 3rd district (2009–2014)
- Shahana Hanif, New York City Council member from the 39th district (2022–present)
- Jumaane Williams, New York City Public Advocate (2019–present), former New York City Council member from the 45th district (2010–2019), candidate for governor of New York in 2022, candidate for lieutenant governor of New York in 2018
- Michelle Wu, mayor of Boston (2021–present), former At-Large member of the Boston City Council (2014–2021), former president of the Boston City Council (2016–2018)

Individuals

- Tahanie Aboushi, civil rights attorney and candidate for Manhattan District Attorney in 2021
- Ana Maria Archila, Center for Popular Democracy transition advisor and former co-executive director, co-founder of Make the Road New York, and candidate for lieutenant governor of New York in 2022
- Ronny Chieng, actor and comedian
- Margaret Cho, actress, comedian, LGBT activist
- Cynthia Nixon, activist, actress, and former candidate for governor of New York in 2018
- Alice Wong, activist
- Bowen Yang, actor, comedian, and Saturday Night Live cast member

Organizations

- Asian American Action Fund
- Churches United for Fair Housing Action
- Downtown Women for Change
- Indivisible Nation Brooklyn
- The Jewish Vote
- Muslim Democratic Club of New York
- New Downtown Dems
- New York Communities for Change
- No IDC NY
- On Leong Chinese Merchants Association
- Save Our Storefronts NY
- Sunrise Movement NYC
- Working Families Party (previously endorsed Jones in the 17th district)
Carlina Rivera

U.S. representatives

- Adriano Espaillat, U.S. representative from New York's 13th congressional district (2017–present), former New York state senator from the 31st district (2011–2016), former New York State Assembly member (1997–2010)
- Nydia Velázquez, chair of the House Small Business Committee (2019–present, 2007–2011), U.S. representative from New York's 7th congressional district (2013–present), former U.S. representative from New York's 12th congressional district (1993–2013), former New York City Council member from the 27th district (1984–1985)

State legislators

- Kenny Burgos, New York State Assembly member from the 85th district (2020–present)
- Jessica Ramos, New York state senator from the 13th district (2019–present)

Local officials

- Adrienne Adams, speaker of the New York City Council (2022–present), New York City Council member from the 28th district (2017–present)
- Alexa Avilés, New York City Council member from the 38th district (2022–present)
- Diana Ayala, deputy speaker of the New York City Council (2022–present), New York City Council member from the 8th district (2018–present)
- Erik Bottcher, New York City Council member from the 3rd district (2022–present)
- Selvena Brooks-Powers, Majority Whip of the New York City Council (2022–present), New York City Council member from the 31st district (2021–present)
- Margaret Chin, former New York City Council member from the 1st district (2010–2021)
- Eric Dinowitz, New York City Council member from the 11th district (2021–present)
- Amanda Farías, New York City Council member from the 18th district (2022–present)
- Vanessa Gibson, Bronx borough president (2022–present), former New York City Council member from the 16th district (2014–2021), former New York State Assembly member from the 77th district (2009–2013)
- Jennifer Gutiérrez, New York City Councilmember from the 34th district (2022–present)
- Kamillah Hanks, New York City Council member from the 49th district (2022–present)
- Rita Joseph, New York City Council member from the 40th district (2022–present)
- Ari Kagan, New York City Council member from the 47th district (2022–present)
- Mark Levine, Manhattan borough president (2022–present), former New York City Council member from the 7th district (2014–2021)
- Farah Louis, New York City Council member from the 45th district (2019–present)
- Julie Menin, New York City Council member from the 5th district (2022–present)
- Mercedes Narcisse, New York City Council member from the 46th district (2022–present) (previously endorsed de Blasio)
- Sandy Nurse, New York City Council member from the 37th district (2022–present)
- Chi Ossé, New York City Council member from the 36th district (2022–present)
- Keith Powers, Majority Leader of the New York City Council (2022–present), New York City Council member from the 4th district (2018–present)
- Lincoln Restler, New York City Council member from the 33rd district (2022–present)
- Antonio Reynoso, Brooklyn borough president (2022–present), former New York City Council member from the 34th district (2014-2021)
- Rafael Salamanca, New York City Council member from the 17th district (2016–present)
- Lynn Schulman, New York City Council member from the 29th district (2022–present)
- Althea Stevens, New York City Council member from the 16th district (2022–present)
- Sandra Ung, New York City Council member from the 20th district (2022–present)
- James Vacca, former New York City Council member from the 13th district (2006–2017)
- Marjorie Velázquez, New York City Council member from the 13th district (2022–present)

Individuals

- Luis Guzman, actor
- Gary Locke, president of Bellevue College (2020–present), former United States Ambassador to China (2011–2014), former United States Secretary of Commerce (2009–2011), former governor of Washington (1997–2005), former King County Executive (1994–1997), former member of the Washington House of Representatives from the 37th district (1983–1994)

Organizations

- Jim Owles Liberal Democratic Club
- New York League of Conservation Voters
- Nuestro PAC
- Stonewall Democratic Club of New York City

Labor unions

- 1199SEIU United Healthcare Workers East
- American Federation of Musicians Local 802
- International Alliance of Theatrical Stage Employees Local 1
- International Union of Painters and Allied Trades District Council 9
- New York State Iron Workers District Council
- NYC District Council of Carpenters
- Steamfitters Local 638
- Teamsters Joint Council 16
- Teamsters Local 817
- Transport Workers Union of America
- Transport Workers Union of America Local 100
Brian Robinson

Newspapers

- The Jewish Press
Jo Anne Simon

State legislators

- Peter J. Abbate Jr., New York State Assembly member from the 49th district (1987–present)
- Steven Cymbrowitz, New York State Assembly member from the 45th district (2001–present)
- Patricia Fahy, New York State Assembly member from the 109th district (2013–present)
- Deborah Glick, New York State Assembly member from the 66th district (1991–present)
- Joan Millman, former New York State Assemblymember from the 52nd district (1997–2014)
- Velmanette Montgomery, former New York state senator from the 25th district (2013–2020), former New York State Senator from the 18th district (1993–2012), former New York state senator from the 22nd district (1985–1992)
- Roxanne Persaud, New York state senator from the 19th district (2015–present), former New York State Assembly member from the 59th district (2015)
- Linda Rosenthal, New York State Assembly member from the 67th district (2006–present)

Local officials

- Margarita López, former New York City Council member from the 2nd district (1997–2006)
Declined to endorse

Organizations

- Democratic Majority for Israel

Labor unions

- District Council 37
- New York State AFL–CIO
- SEIU 32BJ
- United Federation of Teachers

==== Polling ====
Graphical summary

Poll source	Date(s) administered	Sample size	Margin of error	Bill de Blasio	Daniel Goldman	Elizabeth Holtzman	Mondaire Jones	Yuh-Line Niou	Carlina Rivera	Jo Anne Simon	Other	Undecided
Emerson College	August 10–13, 2022	500 (LV)	± 4.3%	3%	22%	4%	13%	17%	13%	6%	5% (Note: Maron with 2%; Gleason, Li, Robinson, and Xiong with 1%; Francis with 0%)	17%
Impact Research (D) (Note: This poll was sponsored by Goldman's campaign.)	~August 7, 2022	500 (LV)	± 4.4%	2%	23%	10%	15%	21%	18%	9%	–	–
Impact Research (D)	July 22–26, 2022	500 (LV)	± 4.4%	–	18%	9%	10%	16%	14%	7%	8%	18%
Change Research (D) (Note: This poll was sponsored by Holtzman's campaign.)	July 19–23, 2022	437 (LV)	± 5.0%	–	14%	12%	10%	10%	10%	10%	3% (Note: Maron with 2%; Robinson with 1%; Francis, Gleason, Li, and Xiong with 0%)	30%
Justice Research Group (WFP) (Note: This poll was sponsored by Working Families Party and Niou's campaign.)	July 1–11, 2022	636 (LV)	± 3.9%	3%	10%	4%	8%	16%	16%	6%	2% (Note: Maron with 2%; Francis, Gleason, Herron, Li, Robinson, Thomas, and Xiong with 0%)	40%
Data for Progress (D)	July 7–10, 2022	533 (LV)	± 4.0%	5%	12%	9%	7%	14%	17%	8%	1% (Note: Maron with 1%)	27%
Impact Research (D)	Late June 2022	– (LV)	–	–	10%	–	9%	14%	12%	–	–	–
Emerson College	May 24–25, 2022	500 (LV)	± 4.3%	6%	–	–	7%	5%	3%	–	3% (Note: Kim with 2%; Robinson and Sheth with 1%; Dooley with 0%)	77%

==== Debate ====
2022 New York's 10th congressional district Democratic primary debate
No.	Date	Host	Moderator	Link	Democratic	Democratic	Democratic	Democratic	Democratic	Democratic	Democratic	Democratic	Democratic	Democratic	Democratic	Democratic
Key: P Participant A Absent N Not invited I Invited W Withdrawn																
Key: P Participant A Absent N Not invited I Invited W Withdrawn					Quanda Francis	Peter Gleason	Dan Goldman	Elizabeth Holtzman	Mondaire Jones	Jimmy Li	Maud Maron	Yuh-Line Niou	Carlina Rivera	Brian Robinson	Jo Anne Simon	Yan Xiong
1	Aug. 2, 2022	Schneps Media	Jane Hanson; Ethan Stark-Miller; Stephen Witt		P	N	P	P	P	P	P	P	P	P	P	N
2	Jul. 19, 2022	New York League of Conservation; Voters Education Fund; The Cooper Union	Danielle Muoio Dunn		P	P	P	P	N	N	N	P	P	N	P	N
3	Jul. 26, 2022	Congregation Beth Elohim	Jacob Kornbluh; Rachel Timoner		N	N	P	P	P	N	P	P	P	P	P	N

==== Primary results ====
Results map by precinct (Interactive map version)

Results map by precinct

Results map by precinct

Results map by precinct

Results map by precinct

Results map by precinct

Results map by precinct

Results map by precinct

Results map by precinct

Democratic primary results
Party	Candidate	Votes	%
Democratic	Dan Goldman	16,686	25.8
Democratic	Yuh-Line Niou	15,380	23.7
Democratic	Mondaire Jones (incumbent) (Note: Due to redistricting, Mondaire Jones decided to move to NY-10, which is not connected by territory to his home district of NY-17.)	11,777	18.2
Democratic	Carlina Rivera	10,985	17.0
Democratic	Jo Anne Simon	3,991	6.2
Democratic	Elizabeth Holtzman	2,845	4.4
Democratic	Jimmy Li	777	1.2
Democratic	Yan Xiong	686	1.1
Democratic	Maud Maron	578	0.9
Democratic	Bill de Blasio (withdrawn)	477	0.7
Democratic	Brian Robinson	322	0.5
Democratic	Peter Gleason	147	0.2
Democratic	Quanda Francis	121	0.2
Total votes		64,772	100.0

=== Republican/Conservative nominee ===
- Benine Hamdan, risk analyst

=== Working Families Party ===
==== Declined ====
- Mondaire Jones, incumbent U.S. representative from the 17th district (2021–present)
- Yuh-Line Niou, New York State Assemblymember from the 65th district (2017–present)

=== General election ===
==== Predictions ====
Source	Ranking	As of
The Cook Political Report	Solid D	May 23, 2022
Inside Elections	Solid D	May 25, 2022
Sabato's Crystal Ball	Safe D	May 25, 2022
Politico	Solid D	May 27, 2022
RCP	Safe D	June 9, 2022
Fox News	Solid D	July 11, 2022
DDHQ	Solid D	July 20, 2022
FiveThirtyEight	Solid D	June 30, 2022
The Economist	Safe D	September 28, 2022

==== Results ====
New York's 10th congressional district, 2022
Party	Candidate	Votes	%
Democratic	Dan Goldman	160,582	83.5
Republican	Benine Hamdan	26,711	13.9
Conservative	Benine Hamdan	2,347	1.2
Total	Benine Hamdan	29,058	15.1
Medical Freedom Party	Steve Speer	1,447	0.7
Write-in		1,260	0.7
Total votes		192,347	100.0
Democratic hold			

== District 11 ==
2022 New York's 11th congressional district election
- November 8, 2022
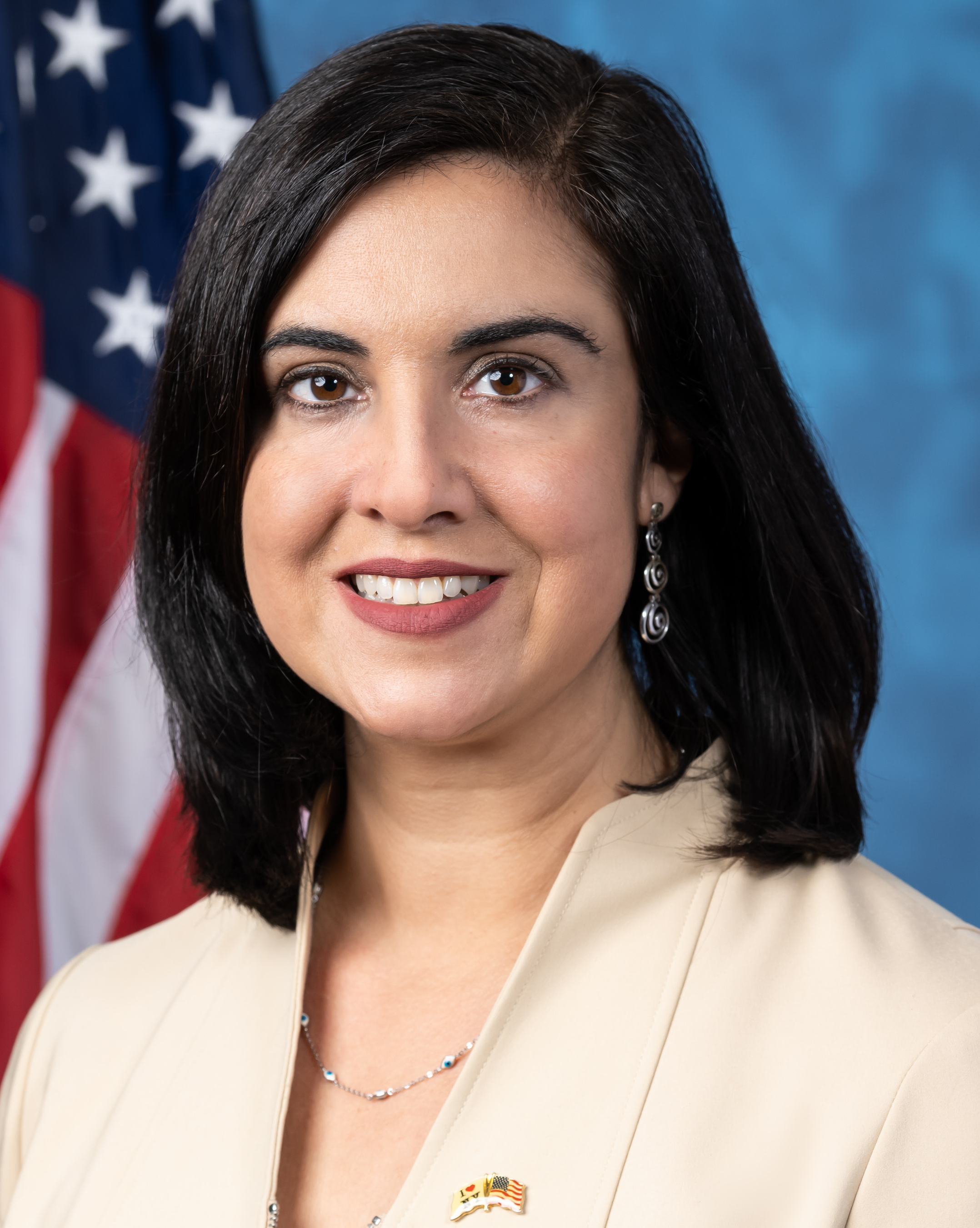

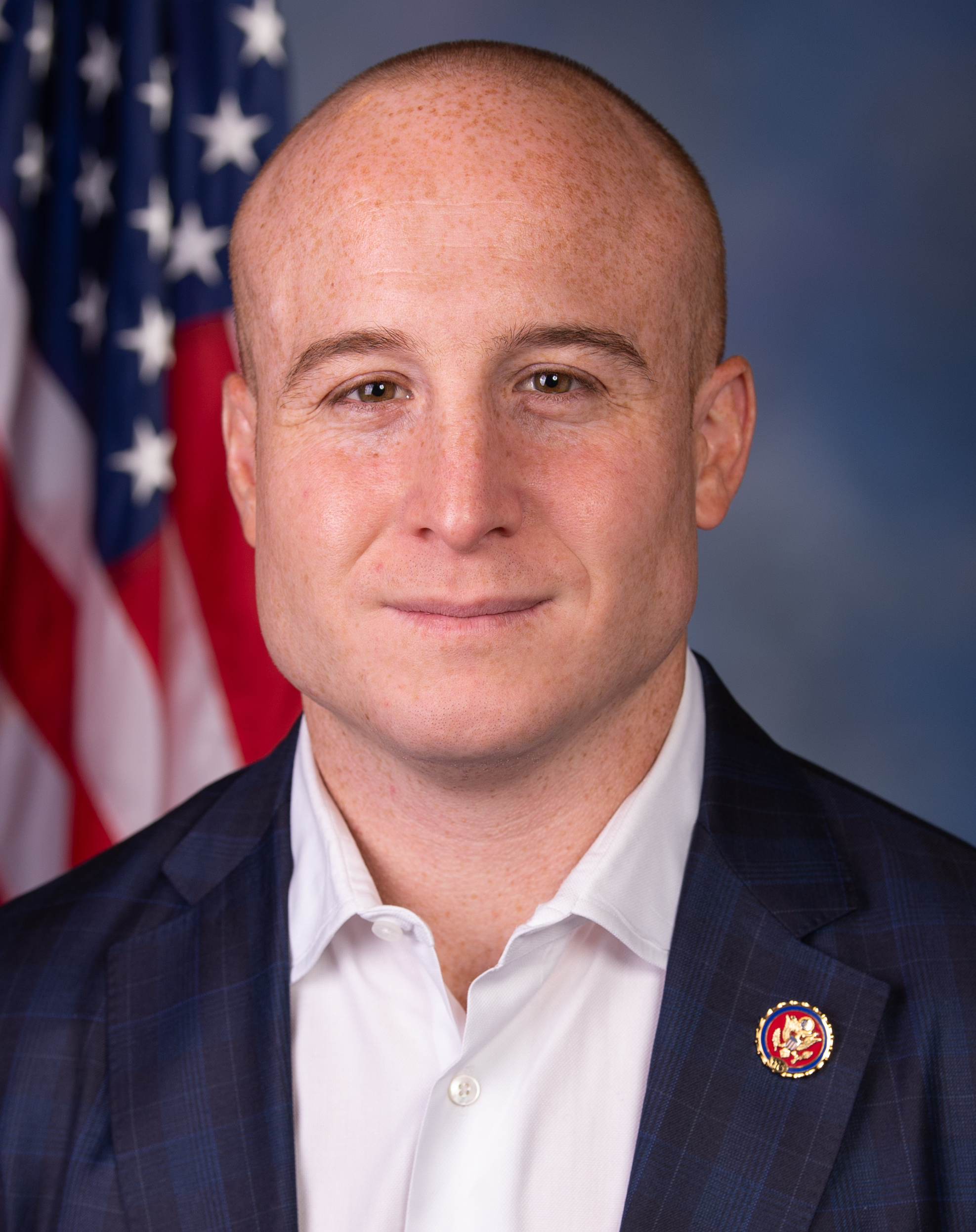
Nominee	Nicole Malliotakis	Max Rose
Party	Republican	Democratic
Alliance	Conservative
Popular vote	115,992	71,801
Percentage	61.7%	38.2%
- Precinct results Malliotakis: 50–60% 60–70% 70–80% 80–90% 90–100% Rose: 50–60% 60–70% 70–80% 80–90% 90–100% No results
U.S. Representative before election
Nicole Malliotakis
Republican
Elected U.S. Representative
Nicole Malliotakis
Republican

The 11th district includes all of Staten Island and the neighborhoods of Bay Ridge, Fort Hamilton, Dyker Heights, Bath Beach, and Bensonhurst in Brooklyn. The seat was mostly unchanged by redistricting. It had a PVI of R+5 and voted for Donald Trump by 8 points in 2020, making it the only Republican-leaning district in New York City. The incumbent was Republican Nicole Malliotakis, who was elected with 53% of the vote in 2020 over then-incumbent Max Rose, who ran again for his former seat, but lost by a landslide margin of 23.5%.

=== Republican/Conservative nominee ===
- Nicole Malliotakis, incumbent U.S. representative

==== Republican primary ====
===== Eliminated =====
- John Matland, former healthcare worker and activist

==== Endorsements ====
Nicole Malliotakis

U.S. executive branch officials

- Donald Trump, 45th president of the United States (2017–2021)

Federal officials

- Nikki Haley, 29th United States Ambassador to the United Nations (2017–2018) and 116th governor of South Carolina (2011–2017)

Organizations

- Citizens for Responsible Energy Solutions
- Conservative Party of Richmond County
- Republican Jewish Coalition PAC
John Matland

Organizations

- New York Young Republican Club
- Stand for Health Freedom
- Teachers for Choice

==== Primary results ====
Republican primary results
Party	Candidate	Votes	%
Republican	Nicole Malliotakis (incumbent)	12,212	78.5
Republican	John Matland	3,348	21.5
Total votes		15,560	100.0

=== Democratic primary ===
==== Candidates ====
===== Nominee =====
- Max Rose, former U.S. representative for this district (2019–2021)

===== Eliminated in primary =====
- Komi Agoda-Koussema, educator
- Brittany Ramos DeBarros, veteran and activist

===== Withdrawn =====
- Mike DeCillis, retired police officer and candidate in 2018 (endorsed Max Rose)

===== Declined =====
- Justin Brannan, New York City Councilmember from the 43rd district (2018–present) (endorsed Rose)
- Bill de Blasio, former mayor of New York City (2014–2021), former New York City Public Advocate (2010–2013), former New York City Councilmember from the 39th district (2002–2009) (ran in the 10th district, then withdrew)
- Charles Fall, New York State Assemblymember from the 61st district (2019–present) (endorsed Rose, then rescinded endorsement)
- Kathryn Garcia, director of New York state operations (2021–present), former Commissioner of the New York City Sanitation Department (2014–2018), candidate for mayor of New York in 2021
- Jumaane Williams, New York City Public Advocate (2019–present), former New York City Councilmember from the 45th district (2010–2019), candidate for lieutenant governor of New York in 2018 (running for governor)

==== Endorsements ====
Brittany Ramos DeBarros

State legislators

- Mathylde Frontus, member of the New York State Assembly from the 46th district (2018–present)
- Gustavo Rivera, member of the New York State Senate from the 33rd district (2011–present)

Local officials

- Ana Maria Archila, former director of Center for Popular Democracy, current director of Make the Road New York, and former candidate in the 2022 New York gubernatorial election
- Melissa Mark-Viverito, former New York City Councilmember from the 8th district (2006–2017), former Speaker of the New York City Council (2014–2017)

Individuals

- Abdul El-Sayed, professor, doctor, former health director for the city of Detroit, former candidate in the 2018 Michigan gubernatorial election
- Khader El-Yateem, pastor, activist, and former candidate in the 2017 New York City Council election
- Christian Smalls, labor organizer and president of the Amazon Labor Union

Organizations

- Brand New Congress
- Citizen Action of New York
- Democracy for America
- Indivisible
- Jewish Voice for Peace Action Fund
- Jim Owles Liberal Democratic Club
- MoveOn
- Our Revolution
- People's Action
- Progressive Change Campaign Committee
- Sunrise Movement NYC
- UltraViolet PAC
- Working Families Party

Labor unions

- United Auto Workers
Max Rose

U.S. representatives

- Jim Clyburn, House Majority Whip (2007–2011, 2019–present), U.S. representative from South Carolina's 6th congressional district (1993–present), former House Assistant Democratic Leader (2011–2019), former chair of the House Democratic Caucus (2006–2007), former vice chair of the House Democratic Caucus (2003–2006)
- Jason Crow, U.S. representative from Colorado's 6th congressional district (2019–present)
- Pramila Jayapal, chair of the Congressional Progressive Caucus (2021–present), U.S. representative from Washington's 7th congressional district (2017–present), former member of the Washington State Senate from the 37th district (2015–2016)
- Katie Porter, U.S. representative from California's 45th congressional district (2019–present)
- Elissa Slotkin, U.S. representative from Michigan's 8th congressional district (2019–present), former acting Assistant Secretary of Defense for International Security Affairs (2014–2017)
- Abigail Spanberger, U.S. representative from Virginia's 7th congressional district (2019–present)
- Ritchie Torres, U.S. representative from New York's 15th congressional district (2021–present)

State legislators

- ~~Charles Fall, New York State Assemblymember from the 61st district (2019–present)~~ (rescinded endorsement)
- Diane Savino, New York state senator from the 23rd district (2005–present)
- Jo Anne Simon, member of the New York State Assembly from the 52nd district (2015–present), former candidate for Brooklyn borough president in 2021

Local officials

- Justin Brannan, New York City Councilmember from the 43rd district (2018–present)
- Debi Rose, former New York City Councilmember from the 49th district (2010–2021)

Individuals

- Wesley Clark
- Mike DeCillis, retired police officer, former candidate for New York's 11th congressional district in 2022, former candidate for New York's 11th congressional district in 2018

Organizations

- Democratic Majority for Israel
- End Citizens United
- NARAL Pro-Choice America (post-primary)
- New Democrat Coalition
- New Politics
- New York State Court Officers Association
- Planned Parenthood Action Fund
- Stonewall Democratic Club of New York City
- VoteVets.org

Labor unions

- District Council 37
- NYC District Council of Carpenters
- New York State United Teachers
- Retail, Wholesale and Department Store Union

==== Primary results ====
Democratic primary results
Party	Candidate	Votes	%
Democratic	Max Rose	15,871	75.0
Democratic	Brittany Ramos DeBarros	4,399	20.8
Democratic	Komi Agoda-Koussema	899	4.2
Total votes		21,169	100.0

=== General election ===
==== Predictions ====
Source	Ranking	As of
The Cook Political Report	Likely R	August 5, 2022
Inside Elections	Likely R	May 25, 2022
Sabato's Crystal Ball	Likely R	May 25, 2022
Politico	Likely R	May 27, 2022
RCP	Safe R	June 9, 2022
Fox News	Likely R	July 11, 2022
DDHQ	Likely R	July 20, 2022
FiveThirtyEight	Solid R	October 20, 2022
The Economist	Likely R	September 28, 2022

==== Polling ====
Poll source	Date(s) administered	Sample size	Margin of error	Nicole Malliotakis (R)	Max Rose (D)	Other	Undecided
Spectrum News/Siena	September 27–30, 2022	451 (LV)	± 5.2%	49%	43%	4% (Note: "Another candidate" and "Not going to vote" with 2%)	5%
1892 Polling (R) (Note: Poll sponsored jointly by the National Republican Congressional Committee and Malliotakis's campaign committee)	June 23–26, 2022	400 (LV)	± 4.9%	51%	36%	–	13%

Hypothetical polling

Generic Republican vs. generic Democrat

Poll source	Date(s) administered	Sample size	Margin of error	Generic Republican	Generic Democrat	Undecided
1892 Polling (R)	June 23–26, 2022	400 (LV)	± 4.9%	48%	32%	20%

==== Results ====
New York's 11th congressional district, 2022
Party	Candidate	Votes	%
Republican	Nicole Malliotakis	107,989	57.4
Conservative	Nicole Malliotakis	8,003	4.3
Total	Nicole Malliotakis (incumbent)	115,992	61.7
Democratic	Max Rose	71,801	38.2
Write-in		306	0.2
Total votes		188,099	100.0
Republican hold			

== District 12 ==
2022 New York's 12th congressional district election
- November 8, 2022
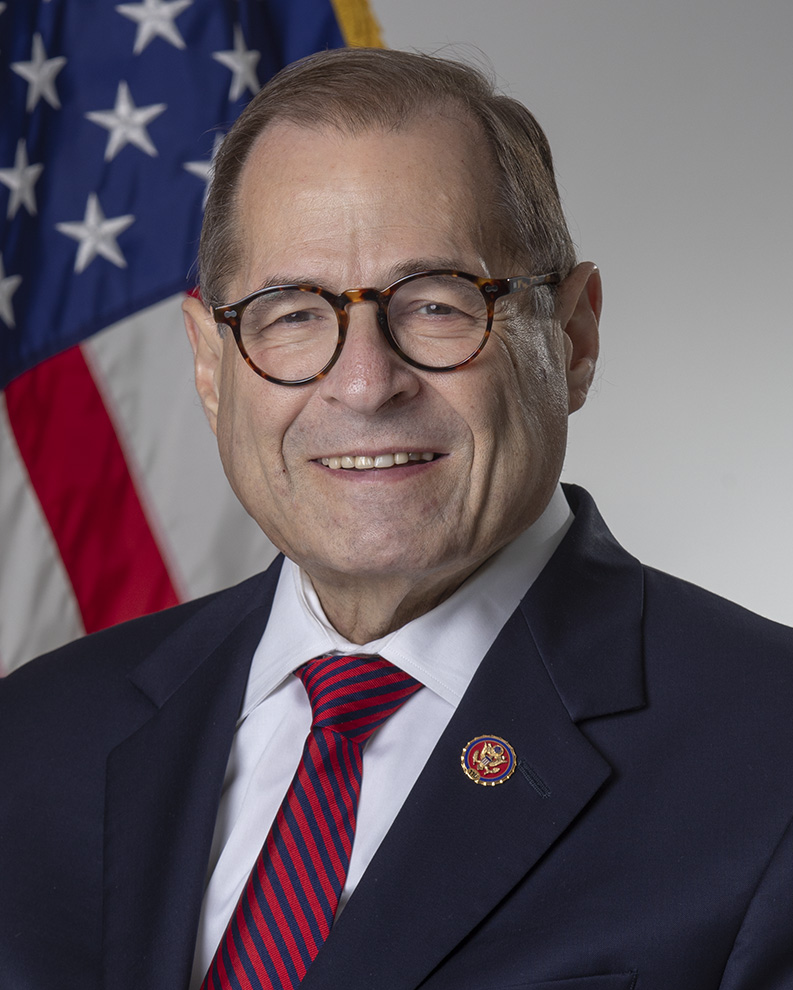

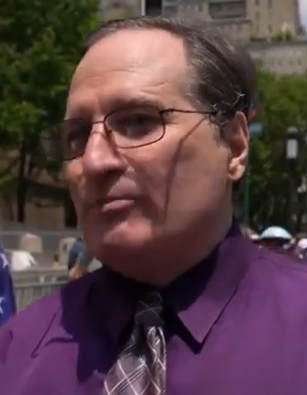
Nominee	Jerry Nadler	Michael Zumbluskas
Party	Democratic	Republican
Alliance	Working Families	Conservative; Parent
Popular vote	200,890	44,173
Percentage	81.6%	18.0%
- Precinct results Nadler: 50–60% 60–70% 70–80% 80–90% 90–100% No results
U.S. Representatives before election
Carolyn Maloney
(Democratic)
Jerry Nadler
(Democratic)
Elected U.S. Representatives
Jerry Nadler
Democratic

The 12th district is entirely based in Manhattan, comprising the Upper West Side, Upper East Side, Midtown, Hell's Kitchen, Chelsea, Murray Hill, and Gramercy. The district was significantly altered by redistricting, losing all previous territory in Queens and now including both the west and east sides of Manhattan. The district was altered so significantly in redistricting as to be a new seat, combining the Manhattan parts of the old 10th and 12th districts. The district had a PVI of D+35 and voted for Joe Biden by 71 points in 2020. The incumbents are Democrats Carolyn Maloney and Jerry Nadler. Maloney was reelected with 82.1% of the vote in 2020 (in the old 12th district), and Nadler was reelected with 74.5% of the vote in 2020 (in the old 10th district).

Nadler and Maloney both chose to run in the new 12th, and Nadler defeated Maloney in the Democratic primary.

This seat has the highest percentage of Jewish voters of any congressional district in the country.

=== Democratic primary ===
==== Nominee ====
- Jerry Nadler, incumbent U.S. representative from the 10th district (previously filed to run in the 10th district)

==== Eliminated in primary ====
- Carolyn Maloney, incumbent U.S. representative
- Suraj Patel, attorney and candidate for the 12th district in 2018 and 2020
- Ashmi Sheth, former Federal Reserve regulator

===== Withdrawn =====
- Rana Abdelhamid, nonprofit founder and activist

==== Endorsements ====
Carolyn Maloney

U.S. representatives

- Pramila Jayapal, chair of the Congressional Progressive Caucus (2021–present), U.S. representative from Washington's 7th congressional district (2017–present), former Washington state senator from the 37th district (2015–2016)
- Sean Patrick Maloney, chair of the Democratic Congressional Campaign Committee (2021–present), U.S. representative from New York's 18th congressional district (2013–present), former White House Staff Secretary (1999–2000)
- Ritchie Torres, U.S. representative from New York's 15th congressional district (2021–present), former New York City Councilmember from the 15th district (2014–2020)

State legislators

- Alessandra Biaggi, New York state senator from the 34th district (2019–present)
- Cordell Cleare, New York state senator from the 30th district (2021–present)
- Deborah Glick, New York State Assemblymember from the 66th district (1991–present) (co-endorsement with Nadler)
- Richard Gottfried, New York State Assemblymember from the 75th district (2003–present), former New York State Assemblymember from the 64th district (1983–2002), former New York State Assemblymember from the 67th district (1973–1982), former New York State Assemblymember from the 61st district (1971-1972)
- Liz Krueger, New York state senator from the 28th District (2002–present)
- Dan Quart, New York State Assemblymember from the 73rd district (2011–present), candidate for Manhattan District Attorney in 2021

Local officials

- Erik Bottcher, New York City Councilmember from the 3rd district (2022–present)
- Daniel Dromm, former New York City Councilmember from the 25th district (2010–2022)
- Corey Johnson, former Speaker of the New York City Council (2018–2021), former New York City Councilmember from the 3rd district (2014–2021), former acting New York City Public Advocate (2019), candidate for New York City Comptroller in 2021
- Ben Kallos, former New York City Councilmember from the 5th district (2014–2022), candidate for borough president of Manhattan in 2021
- Julie Menin, New York City Councilmember from the 5th district (2022–present)
- Keith Powers, Majority Leader of the New York City Council (2022–present), New York City Councilmember from the 4th district (2018–present)
- Christine Quinn, former Speaker of the New York City Council (2006–2013), former New York City Councilmember from the 3rd district (1999–2013), candidate for mayor of New York in 2013, CEO of Women in Need (WIN)
- Donovan Richards, borough president of Queens (2020–present), former New York City Councilmember from the 31st district (2013–2020)
- ~~Carlina Rivera, New York City Councilmember from the 2nd district (2018–present)~~ (rescinded endorsement)
- Lynn Schulman, New York City Councilmember from the 29th district (2022–present)

Individuals

- Liz Abzug, activist and founder of the Bella Abzug Leadership Institute
- Judith Kasen-Windsor, activist
- Carole King, singer
- Eleanor Smeal, co-founder and president of the Feminist Majority Foundation
- Gloria Steinem, journalist and activist

Labor unions

- New York State United Teachers
- Retail, Wholesale and Department Store Union

Organizations

- CHC BOLD PAC
- Congressional Progressive Caucus PAC
- EMILY's List
- Feminist Majority PAC
- Jewish Democratic Council of America
- League of Conservation Voters
- NARAL Pro-Choice America (co-endorsement with Nadler)
- National Organization for Women
- National Women's Political Caucus
- New York League of Conservation Voters
- Planned Parenthood Action Fund (co-endorsement with Nadler)
- Pro-Israel America
- Stonewall Democratic Club of New York City
Jerry Nadler

U.S. senators

- Chuck Schumer, Senate Majority Leader (2021–present) and U.S. senator from New York (1999–present)
- Elizabeth Warren, U.S. senator from Massachusetts (2013–present)

State legislators

- Deborah Glick, New York State Assembly member from the 66th district (1991–present) (co-endorsement with Maloney)
- Brad Hoylman, New York state senator from the 27th district (2013–present), candidate for Manhattan borough president in 2021
- Linda Rosenthal, New York State Assembly member from the 67th district (2006–present)

Local officials

- Gale Brewer, member of the New York City Council from the 6th district (2002–2013, 2022–present), former borough president of Manhattan (2014–2021)
- Brad Lander, New York City Comptroller (2022–present), former New York City Councilmember from the 39th district (2010–2021)
- Scott Stringer, former New York City Comptroller (2014–2021), former borough president of Manhattan (2006–2013), former New York State Assemblymember from the 67th district (1993–2005), candidate for mayor of New York City in 2021

Organizations

- Feminist Majority PAC
- J Street
- Jim Owles Liberal Democratic Club
- NARAL Pro-Choice America (co-endorsement with Maloney)
- New York League of Conservation Voters
- Planned Parenthood Action Fund (co-endorsement with Maloney)
- Working Families Party (previously endorsed Abdelhamid)

Labor unions

- 1199SEIU United Healthcare Workers East
- New York State United Teachers

Newspapers

- The New York Times
Suraj Patel

Local officials

- Michael Bloomberg, 108th mayor of New York City (2002-2013), co-founder and CEO of Bloomberg L.P., Democratic candidate for president in 2020

Individuals

- Steven Donziger, human rights lawyer
- Rishi Kumar, Saratoga Councilmember, candidate for California's 16th congressional district
- Andrew Yang, entrepreneur, founder of Venture for America, Democratic candidate for president of the United States in 2020 and for mayor of New York City in 2021 (Independent, Forward Party)
Declined to endorse

Local officials

- Carlina Rivera, New York City Councilmember from the 2nd district (2018–present) (previously endorsed Maloney)

Organizations

- Democratic Majority for Israel

Labor unions

- District Council 37
- United Federation of Teachers

Newspapers

- New York Post

==== Debate ====
2022 New York's 12th congressional district Democratic primary debate
No.	Date	Host	Moderator	Link	Democratic	Democratic	Democratic	Democratic
Key: P Participant A Absent N Not invited I Invited W Withdrawn								
Key: P Participant A Absent N Not invited I Invited W Withdrawn					Jerry Nadler	Carolyn Maloney	Suraj Patel	Ashmi Sheth
1	Jul. 29, 2022	Schneps Media	Jane Hanson; Stephen Witt		A	A	P	N

==== Polling ====
Poll source	Date(s) administered	Sample size (Note: This poll was sponsored by WPIX and The Hill.)	Margin of error	Carolyn Maloney	Jerry Nadler	Suraj Patel	Other	Undecided
Emerson College	August 12–17, 2022	895 (LV)	± 3.2%	24%	43%	14%	1% (Note: Sheth with 1%)	19%
Slingshot Strategies (D) (Note: This poll was sponsored by the Indian American Impact Fund, which supports Patel.)	August 3–5, 2022	600 (LV)	± 3.9%	27%	29%	20%	5% (Note: Sheth with 5%)	19%
Emerson College	August 1–2, 2022	1,000 (LV)	± 3.0%	31%	40%	11%	0% (Note: Fitzgerald, Joseph, and Sheth with 0%)	17%
Whitman Insight Strategies (D) (Note: This poll was sponsored by Patel's campaign.)	June 2–7, 2022	402 (LV)	± 4.9%	26%	28%	11%	–	35%
Emerson College	May 24–25, 2022	500 (LV)	± 4.3%	31%	21%	4%	9% (Note: Abdelhamid with 6%; Maron with 2%; Fitzgerald with 1%; Cerrotti, and Joseph with 0%)	36%

==== Primary results ====
Results map by precinct (Interactive map version)

Results map by precinct

Results map by precinct

Results map by precinct

Results map by precinct

Democratic primary results
Party	Candidate	Votes	%
Democratic	Jerry Nadler (incumbent)	45,545	55.4
Democratic	Carolyn Maloney (incumbent)	20,038	24.4
Democratic	Suraj Patel	15,744	19.2
Democratic	Ashmi Sheth	832	1.0
Total votes		82,159	100.0

=== Republican/Conservative nominee ===
- Michael Zumbluskas, New York City Department of Transportation employee and perennial candidate

=== Independent candidate ===
- Mikhail (Mike) Itkis, cyber operations officer

=== General election ===
==== Predictions ====
Source	Ranking	As of
The Cook Political Report	Solid D	May 23, 2022
Inside Elections	Solid D	May 25, 2022
Sabato's Crystal Ball	Safe D	May 25, 2022
Politico	Solid D	May 27, 2022
RCP	Safe D	June 9, 2022
Fox News	Solid D	July 11, 2022
DDHQ	Solid D	July 20, 2022
FiveThirtyEight	Solid D	June 30, 2022
The Economist	Safe D	September 28, 2022

==== Results ====
New York's 12th congressional district, 2022
Party	Candidate	Votes	%
Democratic	Jerry Nadler	184,872	75.1
Working Families	Jerry Nadler	16,018	6.5
Total	Jerry Nadler (incumbent)	200,890	81.6
Republican	Michael Zumbluskas	40,994	16.7
Conservative	Michael Zumbluskas	2,715	1.1
Parent Party	Michael Zumbluskas	464	0.2
Total	Michael Zumbluskas	44,173	18.0
Itkis Campaign Party	Mikhail Itkis	631	0.3
Write-in		411	0.2
Total votes		246,105	100.0
Democratic hold			

== District 13 ==
2022 New York's 13th congressional district election
- November 8, 2022
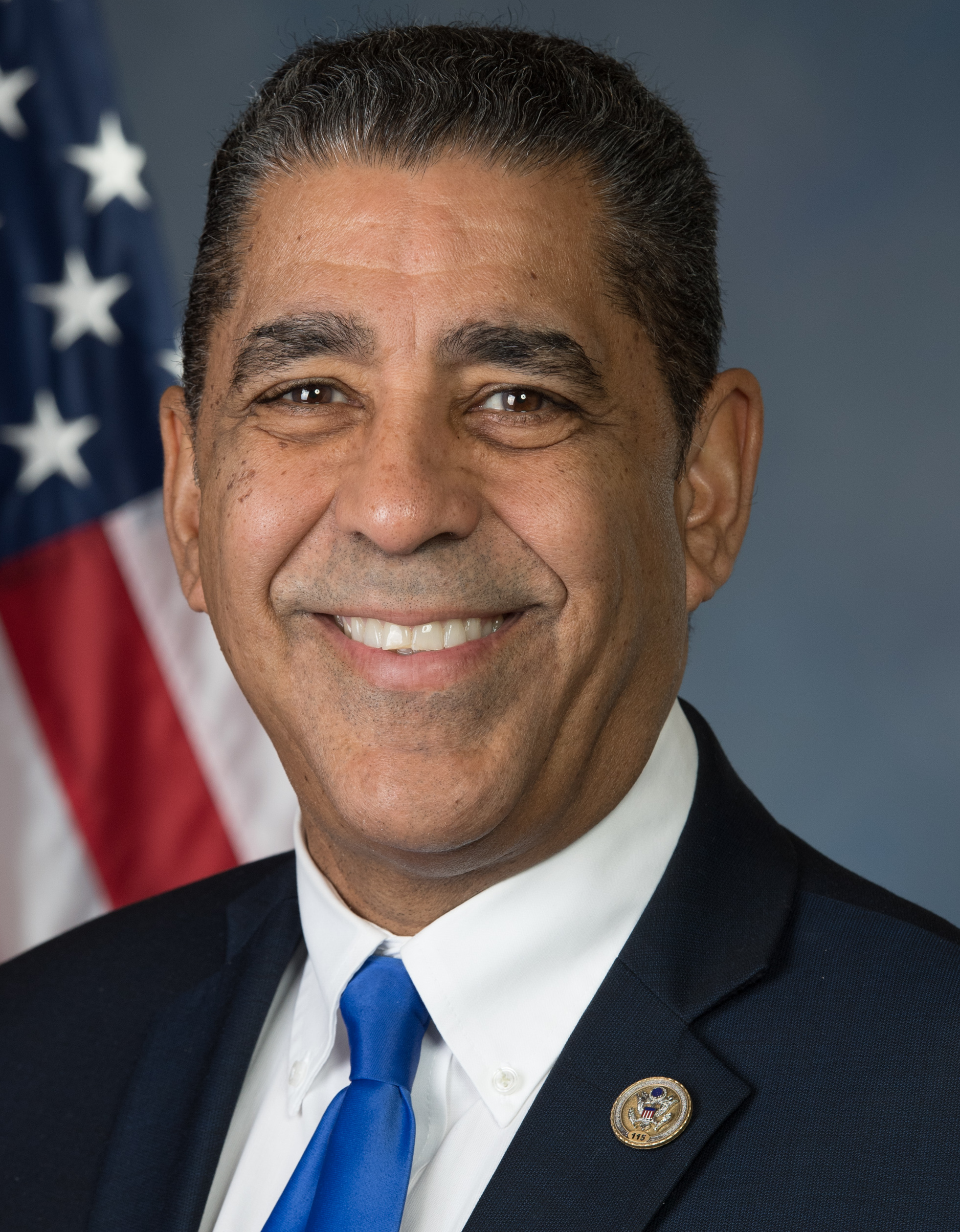
Nominee	Adriano Espaillat
Party	Democratic
Popular vote	116,589
Percentage	98.9%
- Precinct results Espaillat: 90–100% No results
U.S. Representative before election
Adriano Espaillat
Democratic
Elected U.S. Representative
Adriano Espaillat
Democratic

The 13th district is based in Upper Manhattan and the Northwest Bronx, including the neighborhoods of Harlem, Morningside Heights, Spanish Harlem, Hamilton Heights, Washington Heights, Inwood, Marble Hill, Fordham, Kingsbridge, and Bedford Park. The seat was mostly unchanged by redistricting. It had a PVI of D+40, making it the nation's most Democratic-leaning district, and voted for Joe Biden by 78 points in 2020. The incumbent was Democrat Adriano Espaillat, who was reelected with 90.8% of the vote in 2020.This was the only uncontested democratic held seat in the 2022 cycle.

=== Democratic primary ===
==== Candidates ====
===== Nominee =====
- Adriano Espaillat, incumbent U.S. representative

===== Eliminated in primary =====
- Michael Hano, member of the Social Democrats of America
- Francisco Spies

==== Endorsements ====
Adriano Espaillat

Organizations

- Democratic Majority for Israel
- Sierra Club
- Stonewall Democratic Club of New York City

Labor unions

- District Council 37
- New York State United Teachers

==== Primary results ====
Democratic primary results
Party	Candidate	Votes	%
Democratic	Adriano Espaillat (incumbent)	29,782	81.0
Democratic	Michael Hano	4,709	12.8
Democratic	Francisco Spies	2,286	6.2
Total votes		36,777	100.0

=== Republican ===
==== Disqualified ====
- Gary Richards, business executive

=== General election ===
==== Predictions ====
Source	Ranking	As of
The Cook Political Report	Solid D	May 23, 2022
Inside Elections	Solid D	May 25, 2022
Sabato's Crystal Ball	Safe D	May 25, 2022
Politico	Solid D	May 27, 2022
RCP	Safe D	June 9, 2022
Fox News	Solid D	July 11, 2022
DDHQ	Solid D	July 20, 2022
FiveThirtyEight	Solid D	June 30, 2022
The Economist	Safe D	September 28, 2022

==== Results ====
According to the Board of Elections, only Espaillat was on the ballot.

New York's 13th congressional district, 2022
Party	Candidate	Votes	%
Democratic	Adriano Espaillat (incumbent)	116,589	98.9
Write-in		1,257	1.1
Total votes		117,846	100.0
Democratic hold			

== District 14 ==
2022 New York's 14th congressional district election
- November 8, 2022
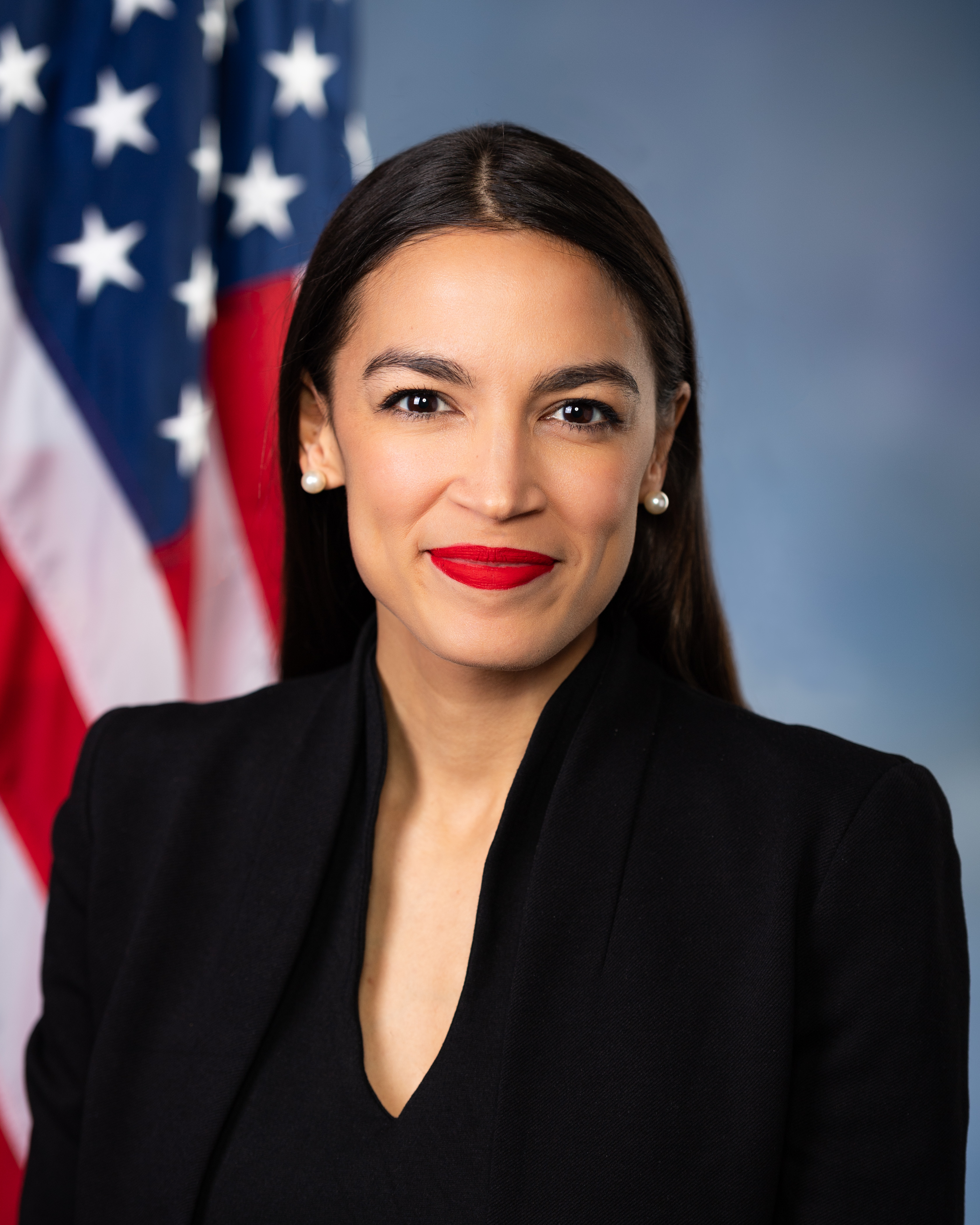

Nominee	Alexandria Ocasio-Cortez	Tina Forte
Party	Democratic	Republican
Alliance	Working Families
Popular vote	82,453	31,935
Percentage	70.6%	27.3%
- Precinct results Ocasio-Cortez: 50–60% 60–70% 70–80% 80–90% 90–100% Forte: 50–60% 60–70% 70–80% Tie: 40%-50% 50% No results
U.S. Representative before election
Alexandria Ocasio-Cortez
Democratic
Elected U.S. Representative
Alexandria Ocasio-Cortez
Democratic

The 14th district is based in North Queens and the East Bronx, including the neighborhoods of Corona, East Elmhurst, Astoria, College Point, Hunts Point, Castle Hill, Throggs Neck, Parkchester, Middletown, Country Club, Co-Op City, and City Island. The district was mostly unchanged by redistricting. It had a PVI of D+30 and voted for Joe Biden by 48 points in 2020. The incumbent was Democrat Alexandria Ocasio-Cortez, who was reelected with 71.6% of the vote in 2020.

=== Democratic Nominee ===
- Alexandria Ocasio-Cortez, incumbent U.S. representative

==== Endorsements ====
Alexandria Ocasio-Cortez

U.S. senators

- Bernie Sanders, U.S. senator from Vermont

Organizations

- Brand New Congress
- Democracy for America
- Democratic Socialists of America
- Feminist Majority PAC
- Jewish Voice for Peace Action Fund
- Justice Democrats
- League of Conservation Voters
- New York League of Conservation Voters
- Progressive Democrats of America
- Sierra Club
- Sunrise Movement
- Working Families Party

Labor unions

- District Council 37

=== Republican primary ===
==== Candidates ====
===== Nominee =====
- Tina Forte, social media influencer

===== Eliminated in primary =====
- Desi Cuellar, former bartender

==== Endorsements ====
Tina Forte

Community leaders

- Rubén Díaz Sr., ordained Pentecostal minister, New York city councilor from District 18 (2018–2021), and New York state senator from District 32 (2003–2017) (Democrat)

Individuals

- Dick Morris, conservative political commentator

==== Primary results ====
Republican primary results
Party	Candidate	Votes	%
Republican	Tina Forte	1,530	67.9
Republican	Desi Cuellar	722	32.1
Total votes		2,252	100.0

=== Conservative nominee ===
- Desi Cuellar, former bartender

=== Libertarian nominee ===
- Jonathan Howe, public defender

All Libertarians were disqualified for all races due to new ballot restrictions.

=== General election ===
==== Predictions ====
Source	Ranking	As of
The Cook Political Report	Solid D	May 23, 2022
Inside Elections	Solid D	May 25, 2022
Sabato's Crystal Ball	Safe D	May 25, 2022
Politico	Solid D	May 27, 2022
RCP	Safe D	June 9, 2022
Fox News	Solid D	July 11, 2022
DDHQ	Solid D	July 20, 2022
FiveThirtyEight	Solid D	June 30, 2022
The Economist	Safe D	September 28, 2022

==== Results ====
New York's 14th congressional district, 2022
Party	Candidate	Votes	%
Democratic	Alexandria Ocasio-Cortez	74,050	63.4
Working Families	Alexandria Ocasio-Cortez	8,403	7.2
Total	Alexandria Ocasio-Cortez (incumbent)	82,453	70.6
Republican	Tina Forte	31,935	27.3
Conservative	Desi Cuellar	2,208	1.9
Write-in		194	0.2
Total votes		116,790	100.0
Democratic hold			

== District 15 ==
2022 New York's 15th congressional district election
- November 8, 2022
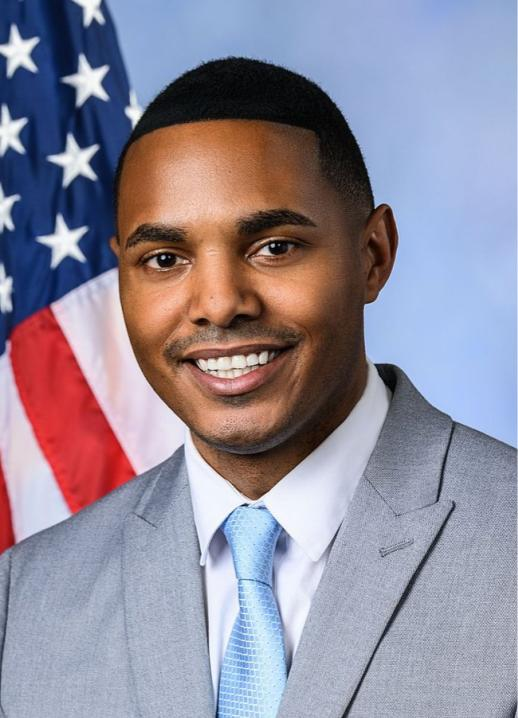

Nominee	Ritchie Torres	Stylo Sapaskis
Party	Democratic	Republican
Popular vote	76,406	15,882
Percentage	82.7%	17.2%
- Precinct results Torres: 50–60% 60–70% 70–80% 80–90% 90–100% Sapaskis: 50–60% 60–70% 90–100% Tie: 50% No results
U.S. Representative before election
Ritchie Torres
Democratic
Elected U.S. Representative
Ritchie Torres
Democratic

The 15th district is based in the West Bronx, including the neighborhoods of Mott Haven, Melrose, Morrisania, Highbridge, Tremont, West Farms, Belmont, Norwood, Woodlawn, Riverdale, and Spuyten Duyvil. The district was mostly unchanged by redistricting, though it did add Riverdale and Spuyten Duyvil. The district had a PVI of D+37 and voted for Joe Biden by 70 points in 2020. The incumbent was Democrat Ritchie Torres, who was elected with 88.7% of the vote in 2020.

=== Democratic nominee ===
- Ritchie Torres, incumbent U.S. representative

==== Endorsements ====
Ritchie Torres

Organizations

- Democratic Majority for Israel
- NARAL Pro-Choice America
- New York League of Conservation Voters
- Pro-Israel America
- Sierra Club
- Stonewall Democratic Club of New York City

Labor unions

- District Council 37

=== Republican nominee ===
- Stylo Sapaskis

=== General election ===
==== Predictions ====
Source	Ranking	As of
The Cook Political Report	Solid D	May 23, 2022
Inside Elections	Solid D	May 25, 2022
Sabato's Crystal Ball	Safe D	May 25, 2022
Politico	Solid D	May 27, 2022
RCP	Safe D	June 9, 2022
Fox News	Solid D	July 11, 2022
DDHQ	Solid D	July 20, 2022
FiveThirtyEight	Solid D	June 30, 2022
The Economist	Safe D	September 28, 2022

==== Results ====
New York's 15th congressional district, 2022
Party	Candidate	Votes	%
Democratic	Ritchie Torres (incumbent)	76,406	82.7
Republican	Stylo Sapaskis	15,882	17.2
Write-in		102	0.1
Total votes		92,390	100.0
Democratic hold			

== District 16 ==
2022 New York's 16th congressional district election
- November 8, 2022
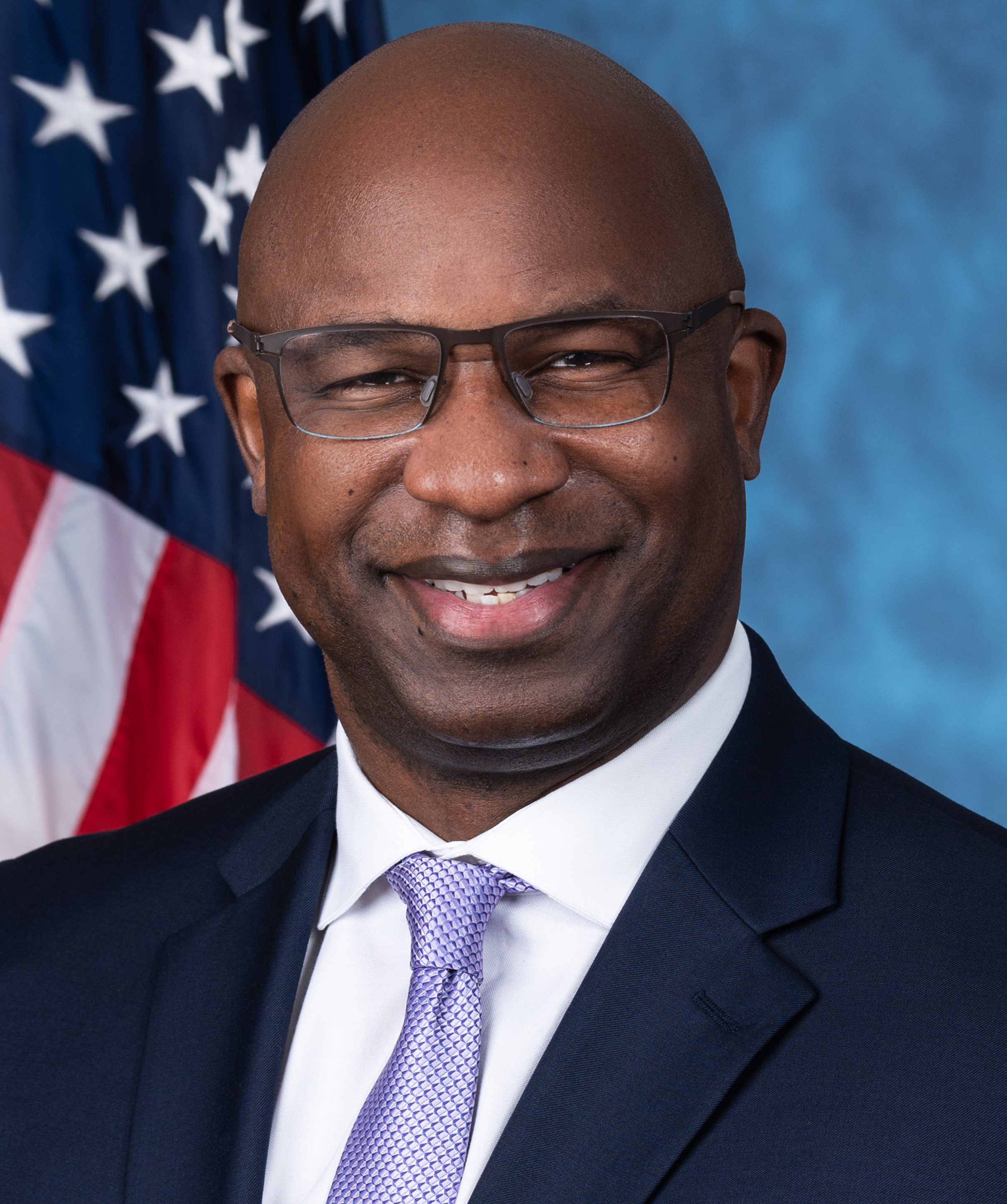

Nominee	Jamaal Bowman	Miriam Flisser
Party	Democratic	Republican
Alliance	Working Families
Popular vote	133,567	74,156
Percentage	64.2%	35.7%
- Precinct results Bowman: 50–60% 60–70% 70–80% 80–90% 90–100% Flisser: 50–60% 60–70% 70–80% 80–90% 90–100% Tie: 50% No results
U.S. Representative before election
Jamaal Bowman
Democratic
Elected U.S. Representative
Jamaal Bowman
Democratic

The 16th district is based in southern Westchester County, including Yonkers, White Plains, New Rochelle, and Rye. It also includes Wakefield in the Bronx. The district was mostly unchanged by redistricting, though it did lose Riverdale and Spuyten Devil to the 15th district. It had a PVI of D+21 and voted for Joe Biden by 44 points in 2020. The incumbent was Democrat Jamaal Bowman, who was elected with 84% of the vote in 2020.

=== Democratic primary ===
==== Nominee ====
- Jamaal Bowman, incumbent U.S. representative

==== Eliminated in primary ====
- Vedat Gashi, Westchester County legislator
- Mark Jaffe, businessman
- Catherine Parker, Westchester County legislator

===== Withdrew =====
- Manuel Casanova, former political strategist (endorsed Gashi)
- Michael Gerald, pastor

==== Endorsements ====
Jamaal Bowman

U.S. senators

- Kirsten Gillibrand, U.S. senator from New York
- Bernie Sanders, U.S. senator from Vermont
- Chuck Schumer, U.S. senator from New York and Senate Majority Leader
- Elizabeth Warren, U.S. senator from Massachusetts

U.S. representatives

- Ayanna Pressley, U.S. representative from Massachusetts's 7th congressional district

Organizations

- Brand New Congress
- Democracy for America
- Justice Democrats
- NARAL Pro-Choice America
- Progressive Democrats of America
- Sierra Club
- Sunrise Movement
- Working Families Party

Labor unions

- District Council 37
- New York State United Teachers
Vedat Gashi

U.S. representatives

- Eliot Engel, former U.S. representative from New York's 16th congressional district (1989–2021)
- Nita Lowey, former U.S. representative from New York's 17th congressional district (1989–2021)

==== Primary results ====
2022 Democratic primary results by precinct Bowman: 30–40%; 40–50%; 50–60%; 60–70%; 70–80%; 80–90%; 90–100%; Gashi: 30–40%; 40–50%; 50–60%; 60–70%; 70–80%; 80–90%; 90–100%; Parker: 40–50%; 60–70%; Tie: 30–40%; 40–50%; 50%; No votes Interactive map version

Democratic primary results
Party	Candidate	Votes	%
Democratic	Jamaal Bowman (incumbent)	21,643	54.2
Democratic	Vedat Gashi	10,009	25.0
Democratic	Catherine Parker	7,503	18.8
Democratic	Mark Jaffee	608	1.5
Total votes		39,961	100.0

=== Republican nominee ===
- Miriam Flisser, former mayor of Scarsdale (2011–2013)

=== General election ===
==== Predictions ====
Source	Ranking	As of
The Cook Political Report	Solid D	May 23, 2022
Inside Elections	Solid D	May 25, 2022
Sabato's Crystal Ball	Safe D	May 25, 2022
Politico	Solid D	May 27, 2022
RCP	Safe D	June 9, 2022
Fox News	Solid D	July 11, 2022
DDHQ	Solid D	July 20, 2022
FiveThirtyEight	Solid D	June 30, 2022
The Economist	Safe D	September 28, 2022

==== Results ====
New York's 16th congressional district, 2022
Party	Candidate	Votes	%
Democratic	Jamaal Bowman	127,024	61.1
Working Families	Jamaal Bowman	6,543	3.1
Total	Jamaal Bowman (incumbent)	133,567	64.2
Republican	Miriam Flisser	74,156	35.7
Write-in		205	0.1
Total votes		207,928	100.0
Democratic hold			

== District 17 ==
2022 New York's 17th congressional district election
- November 8, 2022
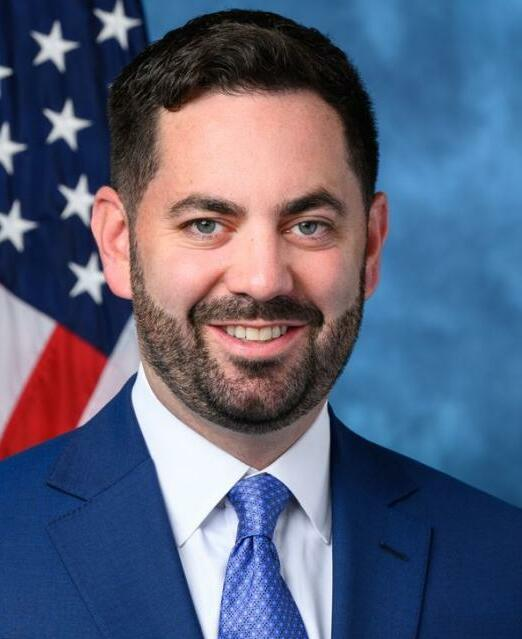

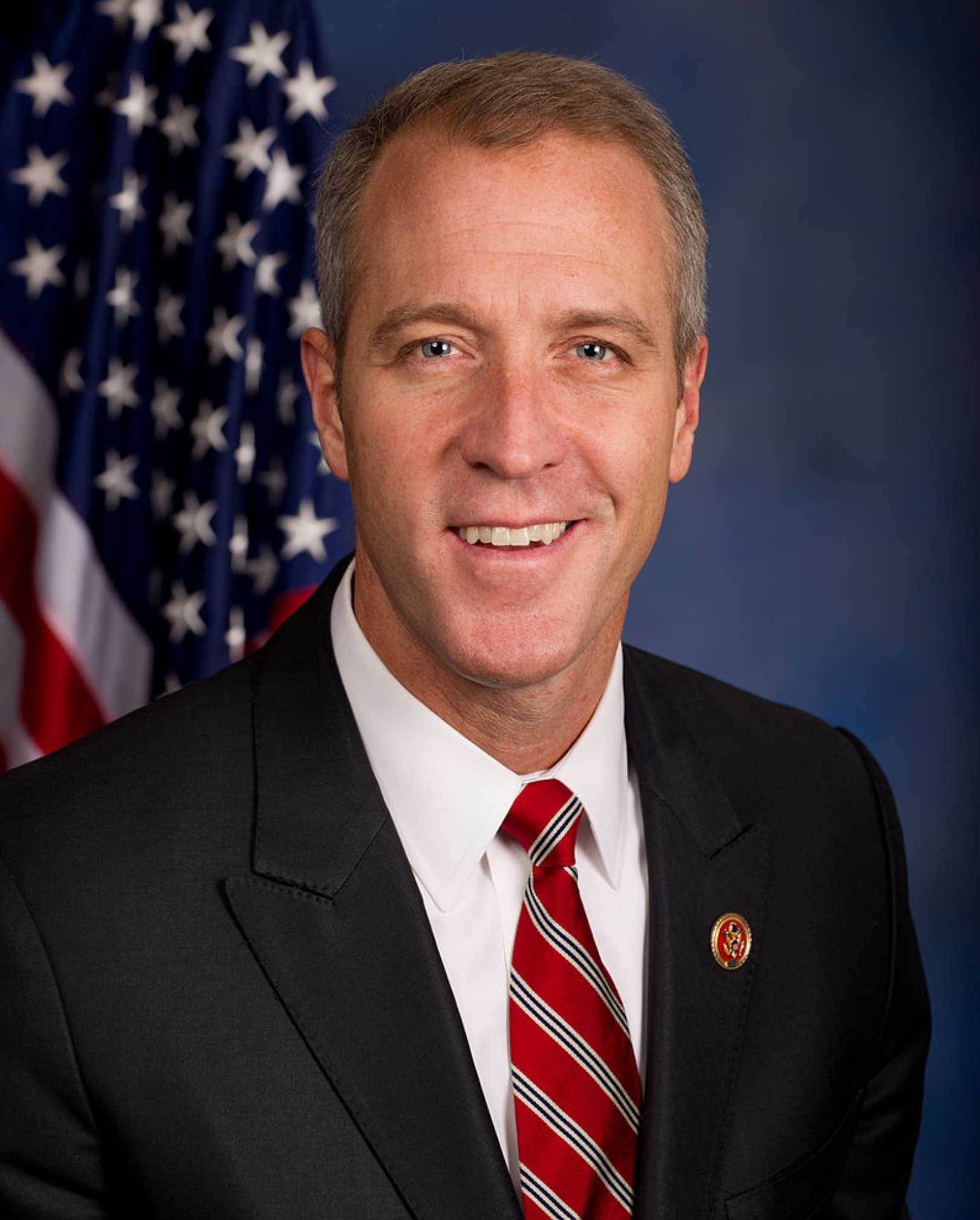
Nominee	Mike Lawler	Sean Patrick Maloney
Party	Republican	Democratic
Alliance	Conservative	Working Families
Popular vote	143,550	141,730
Percentage	50.3%	49.7%
- County results Lawler: 50–60% 60–70% Maloney: 50–60%
U.S. Representative before election
Mondaire Jones
(Democratic)
Sean Patrick Maloney
(Democratic)
Elected U.S. Representative
Mike Lawler
Republican

Prior to redistricting, the 17th district included all of Rockland County and portions of Westchester County. Following redistricting, the 17th district includes all of Putnam and Rockland Counties, northern Westchester County, and a small part of Dutchess County. The district voted for Joe Biden by 10 points in 2020.

The incumbent in the 17th district was Democrat Mondaire Jones. However, the redrawn 17th district included the residence of Sean Patrick Maloney, the Democratic incumbent in the neighboring 18th district and chair of the Democratic Congressional Campaign Committee. According to The Guardian, "Maloney decided to run in New York's 17th congressional district rather than his longtime, more urban, 18th district, even though that meant booting out the newer Mondaire Jones, his fellow Democrat and the incumbent congressman in the 17th district". When Maloney announced his intention to run in the redrawn 17th district, Jones opted not to challenge Maloney; instead, on May 20, 2022, Jones announced that he would seek election in the Lower Manhattan and Brooklyn-based 10th district. Jones finished third in the Democratic primary in the 10th district. Jones had been elected to his 17th district seat with 59.3% of the vote in 2020, while Maloney had been reelected to the neighboring 18th district with 55.8% of the vote in 2020. Maloney's decision to seek election in the 17th district "angered many within his party" and "was considered controversial given Maloney's role as the chair of the House Democrats' campaign arm was to boost incumbents and protect the Democrats' majority in the lower chamber". According to The Hill, Maloney's decision "infuriated Jones and his allies, particularly those in the Congressional Black Caucus, who accused Maloney of putting his own political survival over the interests of the party".

Displeased with Maloney's decision to seek election in the district represented by Jones, progressive state Sen. Alessandra Biaggi opted to challenge Maloney in a Democratic primary. Maloney defeated Biaggi by a wide margin. Republican Assemblymember Mike Lawler easily defeated four other candidates in a Republican primary.

Leading up to Election Day, Maloney "set off on a Europe trip, where he hung out on a balcony overlooking the Seine, and turned up in London, Paris, and Geneva, often alongside congressman Adam Schiff, for gatherings billed as DCCC fundraising events". Maloney also dismissed Republican campaign spending in the district as "'lighting [money] on fire'". Maloney "spent the election cycle using funds and Washington knowhow to shore up vulnerable Democrats across the country", but "had to rush back to his own district for frantic campaigning when it emerged that he, too, was suddenly vulnerable".

After running a campaign that focused on crime and inflation, Lawler narrowly defeated Maloney in the general election. Lawler's victory marked "the first general election defeat for a campaign chair of either party since 1980". Maloney's defeat was "a major upset" and "a humiliating loss for Democrats". Maloney's loss, together with other Republican wins in New York districts, helped Republicans win a majority in the House of Representatives in 2022.

=== Democratic primary ===
==== Nominee ====
- Sean Patrick Maloney, incumbent U.S. representative from the 18th district and chair of the Democratic Congressional Campaign Committee

==== Eliminated in primary ====
- Alessandra Biaggi, state senator from the 34th district (2019–present) (previously filed to run in the 3rd district)

===== Withdrawn =====
- Mondaire Jones, incumbent U.S. representative (running in the 10th district)

==== Endorsements ====
Sean Patrick Maloney

Executive branch officials

- Bill Clinton, 42nd president of the United States (1993–2001)
- Alan Solomont, former United States Ambassador to Spain and United States Ambassador to Andorra (2010–2013)

U.S. representatives

- Nita Lowey, former U.S. representative from New York (1989–2021)

State legislators

- Carl Heastie, Speaker of the New York State Assembly (2015–present) and New York State Assembly member from the 83rd district (2001-present)

Organizations

- American Israel Public Affairs Committee
- Democratic Majority for Israel
- End Citizens United
- Giffords
- Jewish Democratic Council of America
- League of Conservation Voters
- Sierra Club
- ~~Working Families Party~~ (switched endorsement to Biaggi)

Newspapers

- The New York Times
Alessandra Biaggi

U.S. representatives

- Alexandria Ocasio-Cortez, U.S. representative from New York's 14th congressional district (2019–present)

Organizations

- Democracy for America
- Progressive Change Campaign Committee
- Working Families Party (previously endorsed Maloney)

==== Polling ====
Poll source	Date(s) administered	Sample size	Margin of error	Alessandra Biaggi	Sean Patrick Maloney	Undecided
Global Strategy Group (D) (Note: Poll sponsored by Maloney's campaign)	July 11–14, 2022	233 (LV)	± 6.4%	18%	52%	30%
Justice Research Group (D) (Note: This poll was sponsored by the Working Families Party and Biaggi's campaign.)	July 1–11, 2022	402 (LV)	± 4.9%	21%	34%	45%
Global Strategy Group (D)	May 26 – June 1, 2022	385 (LV)	± 5.0%	15%	45%	39%

==== Primary results ====
Results by county Maloney: 60–70%; 70–80%

Democratic primary results
Party	Candidate	Votes	%
Democratic	Sean Patrick Maloney (incumbent)	21,525	66.7
Democratic	Alessandra Biaggi	10,752	33.3
Total votes		32,277	100.0

=== Republican primary ===
==== Candidates ====
===== Nominee =====
- Mike Lawler, New York State Assemblymember from the 97th district (2021–2022)

===== Eliminated in primary =====
- Shoshana M. David
- Charles J. Falciglia
- William G. Faulkner
- Jack W. Schrepel

==== Primary results ====
Republican primary results
Party	Candidate	Votes	%
Republican	Mike Lawler	11,603	75.8
Republican	William Faulkner	1,772	11.6
Republican	Charles Falciglia	1,310	8.6
Republican	Shoshana David	444	2.9
Republican	Jack Schrepel	176	1.1
Total votes		15,305	100.0

=== Conservative primary ===
==== Candidates ====
===== Nominee =====
- Mike Lawler, New York State Assemblymember from the 97th district (2021–2022) (Republican)

===== Eliminated in primary =====
- William G. Faulkner

==== Primary results ====
Conservative primary results
Party	Candidate	Votes	%
Conservative	Mike Lawler	1,049	87.9
Conservative	William Faulkner	144	12.1
Total votes		1,193	100.0

=== General election ===
==== Predictions ====
Source	Ranking	As of
The Cook Political Report	Tossup	October 24, 2022
Inside Elections	Tossup	November 3, 2022
Sabato's Crystal Ball	Lean D	May 25, 2022
Politico	Tossup	November 3, 2022
RCP	Tossup	June 9, 2022
Fox News	Tossup	October 25, 2022
DDHQ	Likely D	October 16, 2022
FiveThirtyEight	Lean D	October 26, 2022
The Economist	Lean D	October 16, 2022

==== Polling ====
Poll source	Date(s) administered	Sample size	Margin of error	Sean Patrick Maloney (D)	Mike Lawler (R)	Undecided
McLaughlin & Associates (R) (Note: This poll was sponsored by Lawler's campaign.)	October 12–14, 2022	400 (LV)	± 4.9%	46%	52%	2%
McLaughlin & Associates (R)	September 6–8, 2022	400 (LV)	± 4.5%	45%	49%	6%
McLaughlin & Associates (R)	July 19–21, 2022	400 (LV)	± 4.9%	44%	46%	10%

Hypothetical polling

Alessandra Biaggi vs. Mike Lawler

Poll source	Date(s) administered	Sample size	Margin of error	Alessandra Biaggi (D)	Mike Lawler (R)	Undecided
McLaughlin & Associates (R)	July 19–21, 2022	400 (LV)	± 4.9%	41%	47%	12%

==== Results ====
New York's 17th congressional district, 2022
Party	Candidate	Votes	%
Republican	Mike Lawler	125,738	44.1
Conservative	Mike Lawler	17,812	6.2
Total	Mike Lawler	143,550	50.3
Democratic	Sean Patrick Maloney	133,457	46.8
Working Families	Sean Patrick Maloney	8,273	2.9
Total	Sean Patrick Maloney (incumbent)	141,730	49.7
Write-in		150	0.0
Total votes		285,430	100.0
Republican gain from Democratic			

== District 18 ==
2022 New York's 18th congressional district election
- November 8, 2022
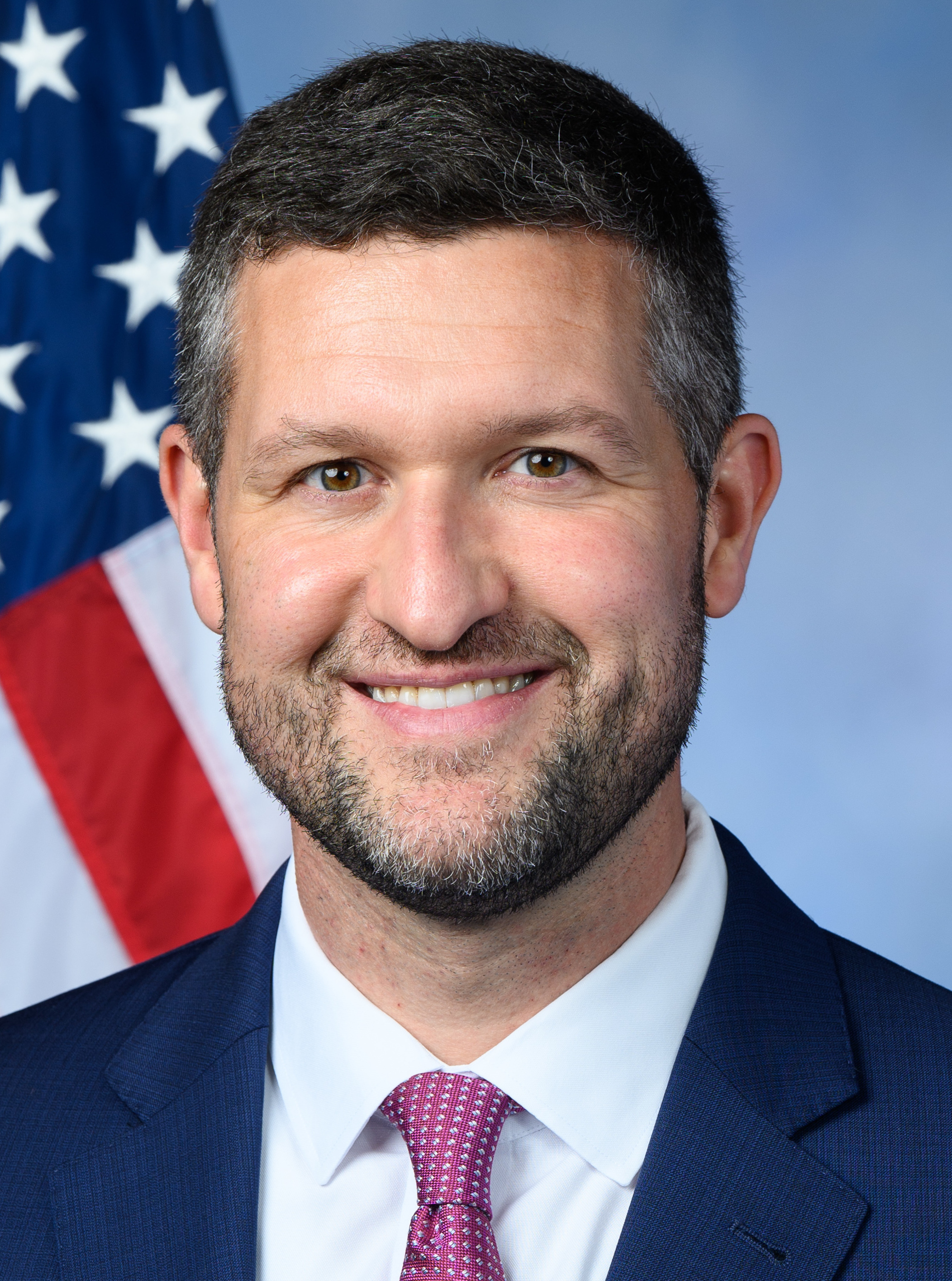

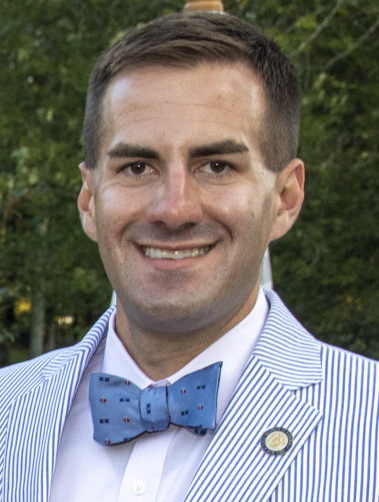
Nominee	Pat Ryan	Colin Schmitt
Party	Democratic	Republican
Alliance	Working Families	Conservative
Popular vote	135,245	131,653
Percentage	50.6%	49.3%
- County results Ryan: 50–60% Schmitt: 50–60%
U.S. Representative before election
Pat Ryan
Democratic
Elected U.S. Representative
Pat Ryan
Democratic

The 18th district is based in the mid-Hudson Valley, including all of Orange County and most of Dutchess and Ulster Counties. The seat was modestly altered due to redistricting, losing all of Putnam County and parts of Westchester County to the 17th district while picking up the portions of Dutchess and Ulster Counties formerly in the 19th district. The district had a PVI of D+1 and voted for Joe Biden by 8 points in 2020. The incumbents were Democrat Sean Patrick Maloney, who was reelected with 55.8% of the vote in 2020, and Democrat Pat Ryan, who was first elected in 2022 in a special election with 51.2% of the vote. Maloney ran for reelection in the neighboring 17th district instead, while Pat Ryan ran for reelection in this district. In the general election Pat Ryan narrowly beat Schmitt, with Schmitt conceding defeat. After the election, it became public that a Democrat-aligned group had tried to request Schmitt's military records without authorization.

=== Democratic primary ===
==== Nominee ====
- Pat Ryan, incumbent U.S. representative from the 19th district

==== Eliminated in primary ====
- Aisha Mills, political strategist
- Moses Mugulusi

==== Withdrawn ====
- Sean Patrick Maloney, incumbent U.S. representative (running in the 17th district)

==== Declined ====
- James Skoufis, New York state senator from the 39th district (2019–present), former New York State Assemblymember from the 99th district (2013–2018) (running for reelection)

==== Endorsements ====
Pat Ryan

Organizations

- League of Conservation Voters
- New Politics
- New York League of Conservation Voters
- Sierra Club
- VoteVets.org
- Working Families Party
Aisha Mills

Organizations

- LPAC

==== Primary results ====
Democratic primary results
Party	Candidate	Votes	%
Democratic	Pat Ryan	29,400	84.1
Democratic	Aisha Mills	4,603	13.2
Democratic	Moses Mugulusi	966	2.8
Total votes		34,969	100.0

=== Republican nominee ===
- Colin Schmitt, New York State Assembly member from the 99th district (2019–2022)

==== Endorsements ====
Colin Schmitt

Local officials

- Tony Cardone, Monroe town supervisor
- Pete Tuohy, Orange County legislator

Organizations

- New York Young Republican Club

=== General election ===
==== Predictions ====
Source	Ranking	As of
The Cook Political Report	Lean D	August 24, 2022
Inside Elections	Tilt D	October 21, 2022
Sabato's Crystal Ball	Lean D	August 24, 2022
Politico	Lean D	May 27, 2022
RCP	Tossup	August 24, 2022
Fox News	Tossup	September 20, 2022
DDHQ	Likely D	October 21, 2022
FiveThirtyEight	Lean D	September 22, 2022
The Economist	Lean D	September 28, 2022

==== Polling ====
Hypothetical polling

Sean Patrick Maloney vs. Colin Schmitt

Poll source	Date(s) administered	Sample size	Margin of error	Sean Patrick Maloney (D)	Colin Schmitt (R)	Undecided
Global Strategy Group (D)	March 10–13, 2022	500 (LV)	± 4.4%	49%	37%	14%
BK Strategies (R) (Note: Poll sponsored by Schmitt's campaign)	February 5–7, 2022	300 (LV)	± 5.7%	37%	38%	25%

==== Results ====
New York's 18th congressional district, 2022
Party	Candidate	Votes	%
Democratic	Pat Ryan	123,168	46.1
Working Families	Pat Ryan	12,077	4.5
Total	Pat Ryan (incumbent)	135,245	50.6
Republican	Colin Schmitt	116,972	43.8
Conservative	Colin Schmitt	14,681	5.5
Total	Colin Schmitt	131,653	49.3
Write-in		155	0.1
Total votes		267,053	100.0
Democratic hold			

== District 19 ==
2022 New York's 19th congressional district election
- November 8, 2022
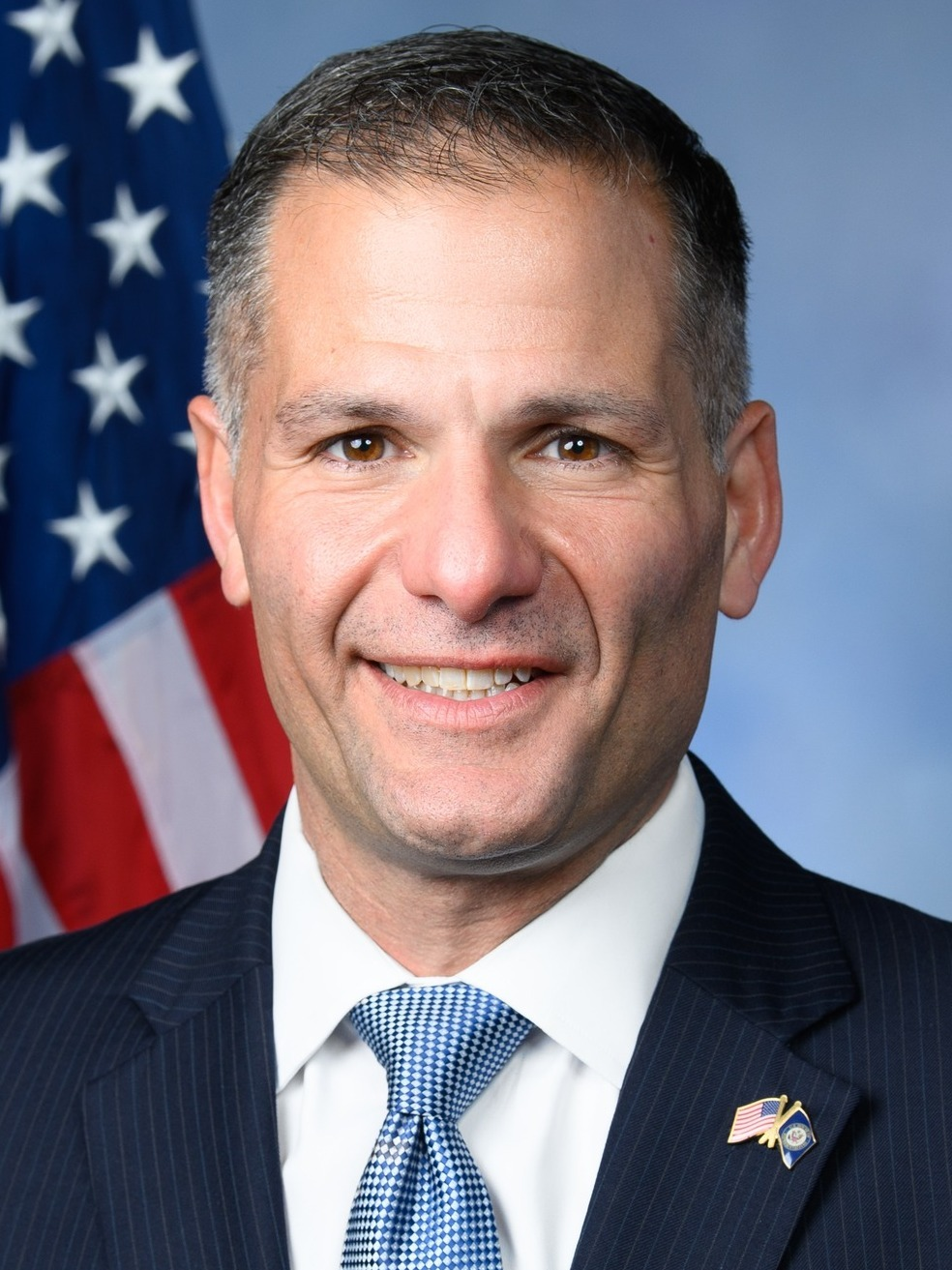

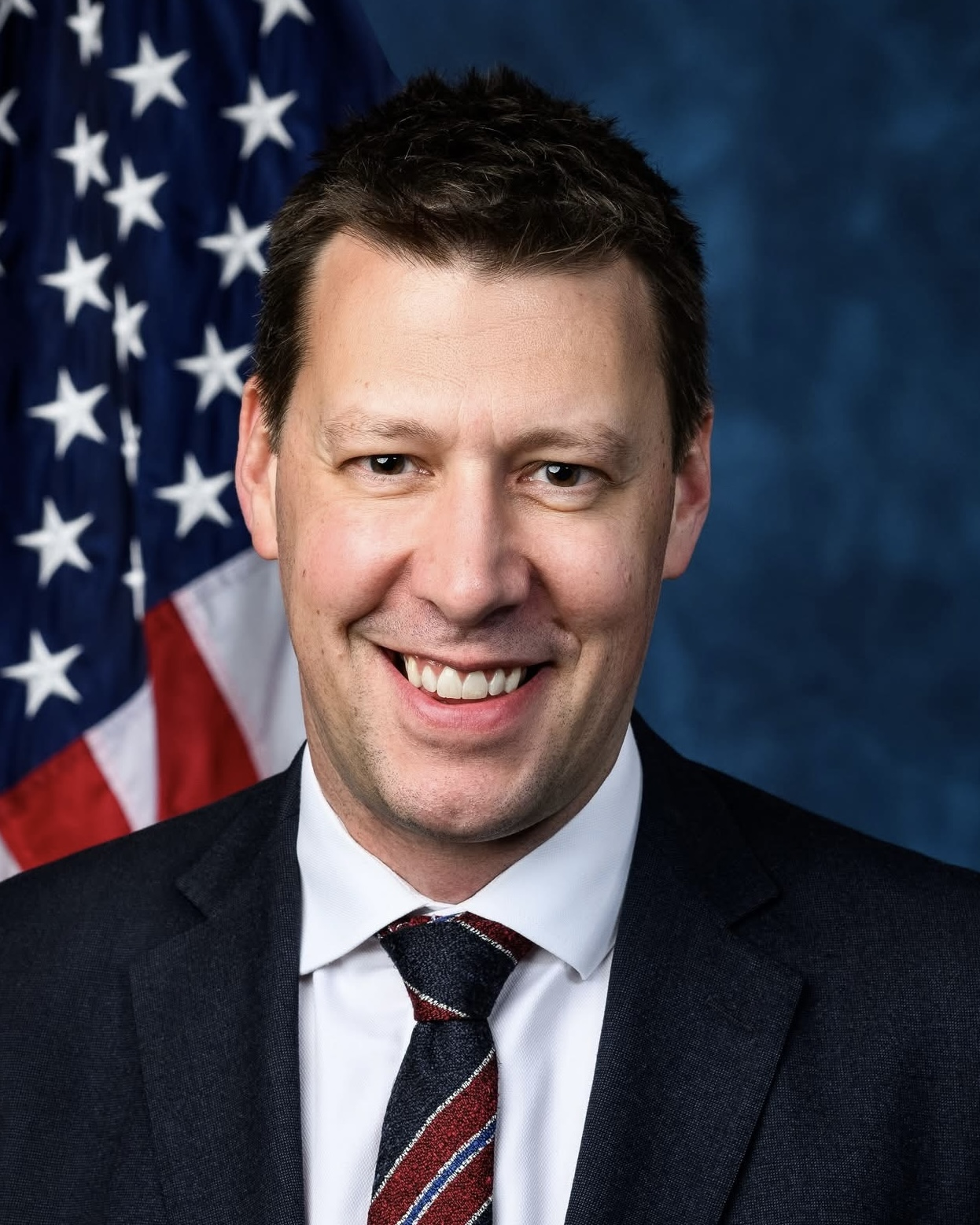
Nominee	Marc Molinaro	Josh Riley
Party	Republican	Democratic
Alliance	Conservative	Working Families
Popular vote	146,004	141,509
Percentage	50.8%	49.2%
- Precinct results Molinaro: 50–60% 60–70% 70–80% 80–90% 90–100% Riley: 50–60% 60–70% 70–80% 80–90% 90–100% Tie: 50%
U.S. Representative before election
None
(Redistricting)
Elected U.S. Representative
Marc Molinaro
Republican

The 19th district stretches from the Upper Hudson Valley across the Catskill Mountains to parts of the Southern Tier and Finger Lakes, including Hudson, Woodstock, Monticello, Oneonta, Binghamton, and Ithaca. It includes all of Columbia, Greene, Sullivan, Delaware, Chenango, Cortland, Broome, Tioga, and Tompkins counties, and parts of Otsego and Ulster Counties. The district was modestly altered by redistricting, losing all of its territory in Dutchess County and most of its territory in Ulster County in exchange for Binghamton and Ithaca. The district had an even PVI and voted for Joe Biden by 5 points in 2020. The incumbent was Democrat Antonio Delgado, who was reelected with 54.8% of the vote in 2020. However, on May 3, 2022, Governor Kathy Hochul announced her intention to appoint Delgado to the vacant lieutenant governor position, triggering a special election that Democrat Pat Ryan won with 51.2% of the vote. Ryan was then redistricted into the neighboring 18th district, leaving this seat open.

=== Democratic primary ===
==== Nominee ====
- Josh Riley, lawyer, aide to former U.S. Representative Maurice Hinchey, and general counsel to U.S. Senator Al Franken on the U.S. Senate Judiciary Committee (previously filed to run in the 22nd district)

==== Eliminated in primary ====
- Jamie Cheney, businesswoman

==== Declined ====
- Michelle Hinchey, member of the New York State Senate from the 46th district (2021–present) (running for reelection)
- Zephyr Teachout, special advisor in the office of the attorney general of New York (2022–present), Fordham University law professor, candidate for governor in 2014, nominee for New York's 19th congressional district in 2016, candidate for attorney general in 2018 and 2022

==== Withdrawn ====
- Antonio Delgado, resigned as U.S. representative to become lieutenant governor

==== Endorsements ====
Jamie Cheney

U.S. representatives

- Kathy Manning, U.S. representative from North Carolina's 6th congressional district

State legislators

- Didi Barrett, state assemblywoman from the 106th district

Organizations

- EMILY's List
- VoteRunLead
Josh Riley

State legislators

- Anna Kelles, state assemblywoman from the 125th district

Local officials

- Jason Garnar, Broome County executive

Individuals

- Tracy Mitrano, nominee for the 23rd district in 2020 and 2018

Organizations

- Democracy for America
- League of Conservation Voters
- NARAL Pro-Choice America (post-primary)
- Sierra Club

Labor unions

- Communication Workers of America District 1

==== Primary results ====
Democratic primary results
Party	Candidate	Votes	%
Democratic	Josh Riley	30,538	63.5
Democratic	Jamie Cheney	17,533	36.5
Total votes		48,071	100.0

=== Republican nominee ===
- Marc Molinaro, Dutchess County executive and nominee for governor of New York in 2018

==== Disqualified ====
- Brandon Buccola

==== Withdrew ====
- Kyle Van De Water, Republican nominee for this district in 2020

==== Endorsements ====
Marc Molinaro

Organizations

- New York Federation of College Republicans
- New York Young Republican Club

=== General election ===
==== Predictions ====
Source	Ranking	As of
The Cook Political Report	Tossup	May 23, 2022
Inside Elections	Tossup	October 21, 2022
Sabato's Crystal Ball	Lean R (flip)	November 7, 2022
Politico	Tossup	May 27, 2022
RCP	Tossup	November 6, 2022
Fox News	Lean R (flip)	November 1, 2022
DDHQ	Tossup	November 4, 2022
FiveThirtyEight	Tossup	November 8, 2022
The Economist	Tossup	October 12, 2022

==== Polling ====
Poll source	Date(s) administered	Sample size	Margin of error	Josh Riley (D)	Marc Molinaro (R)	Other	Undecided
Spectrum News/Siena	October 27 – November 1, 2022	455 (LV)	± 5.0%	48%	43%	3% (Note: "Another candidate" with 2%; "Not going to vote" with 1%)	6%
Spectrum News/Siena	September 25–28, 2022	470 (LV)	± 5.0%	46%	41%	3%	11%
Triton Polling & Research (R) (Note: Poll sponsored by Freedom Council USA, which supports Molinaro)	September 20–22, 2022	658 (LV)	± 3.8%	42%	51%	–	7%
RMG Research	August 27 – September 2, 2022	400 (LV)	± 4.9%	44%	41%	1%	13%
Garin-Hart-Yang Research Group (D) (Note: Poll sponsored by Riley's campaign)	August 29 – September 1, 2022	403 (LV)	± 5.0%	47%	44%	–	9%

==== Results ====
New York's 19th congressional district, 2022
Party	Candidate	Votes	%
Republican	Marc Molinaro	129,960	45.2
Conservative	Marc Molinaro	16,044	5.6
Total	Marc Molinaro	146,004	50.8
Democratic	Josh Riley	124,396	43.2
Working Families	Josh Riley	17,113	6.0
Total	Josh Riley	141,509	49.2
Write-in		105	0.0
Total votes		287,618	100.0
Republican win (new seat)			

== District 20 ==
2022 New York's 20th congressional district election
- November 8, 2022
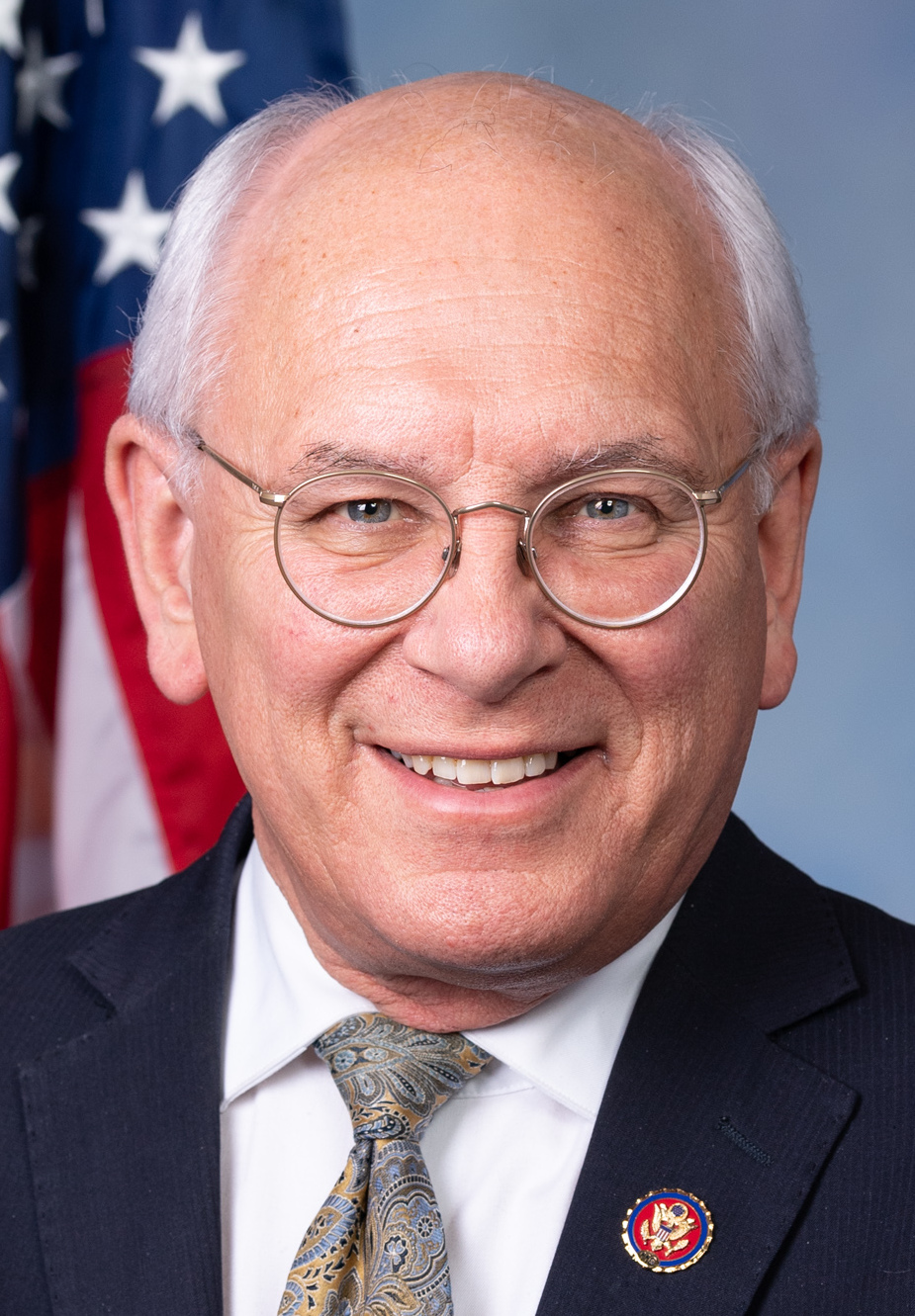

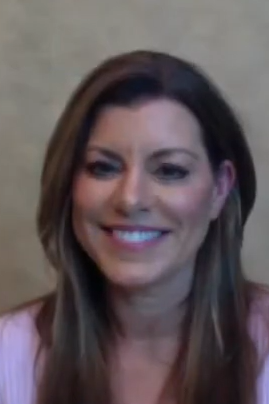
Nominee	Paul Tonko	Liz Joy
Party	Democratic	Republican
Alliance	Working Families	Conservative
Popular vote	160,420	130,869
Percentage	55.1%	44.9%
- Precinct results Tonko: 50–60% 60–70% 70–80% 80–90% 90–100% Joy: 50–60% 60–70% 70–80% 80–90% 90–100% Tie: 50% No results
U.S. Representative before election
Paul Tonko
Democratic
Elected U.S. Representative
Paul Tonko
Democratic

The 20th district is based in the Capital Region, including Albany, Troy, Schenectady, and Saratoga Springs. It includes all of Albany, Schenectady, and Saratoga counties and parts of Rensselaer County. Due to redistricting, the district lost Amsterdam to the 21st district. It had a PVI of D+7 and voted for Joe Biden by 20 points in 2020. The incumbent was Democrat Paul Tonko, who was reelected with 61.2% of the vote in 2020.

=== Democratic primary ===
==== Candidates ====
===== Nominee =====
- Paul Tonko, incumbent U.S. representative

===== Elimated in primary =====
- Rostov Rar

===== Disqualified =====
- Justin Raphael Chaires
- Jack Fallon-Underwood, musician
- Cole Francis Matthews

==== Endorsements ====
Paul Tonko

Organizations

- New York League of Conservation Voters
- Sierra Club

==== Forum ====
2022 New York's 20th congressional district democratic primary candidate forum
No.	Date	Host	Moderator	Link	Democratic	Democratic
Key: P Participant A Absent N Not invited I Invited W Withdrawn						
Key: P Participant A Absent N Not invited I Invited W Withdrawn					Paul Tonko	Rostov Rar
1	Aug. 15, 2022	Leagues of Women Voters of Albany, Saratoga and Schenectady counties	Linda McKenney		P	P

==== Primary results ====
Democratic primary results
Party	Candidate	Votes	%
Democratic	Paul Tonko (incumbent)	17,846	88.3
Democratic	Rostov Rar	2,358	11.7
Total votes		20,204	100.0

=== Republican nominee ===
- Liz Joy, Republican nominee for this district in 2020

==== Endorsements ====
Liz Joy

Organizations

- New York Federation of College Republicans
- New York Young Republican Club

=== General election ===
==== Debate ====
2022 New York's 20th congressional district debate
No.	Date	Host	Moderator	Link	Democratic	Republican
Key: P Participant A Absent N Not invited I Invited W Withdrawn						
Key: P Participant A Absent N Not invited I Invited W Withdrawn					Paul Tonko	Liz Joy
1	Oct. 27, 2022	League of Women Voters Capital Region chapter Times Union; WAMC; WMHT (TV)	Dan Clark	(Note: Debate starts at 7:09)	P	P

==== Predictions ====
Source	Ranking	As of
The Cook Political Report	Solid D	May 23, 2022
Inside Elections	Solid D	May 25, 2022
Sabato's Crystal Ball	Safe D	May 25, 2022
Politico	Likely D	October 18, 2022
RCP	Likely D	June 9, 2022
Fox News	Solid D	August 22, 2022
DDHQ	Solid D	September 1, 2022
FiveThirtyEight	Solid D	June 30, 2022
The Economist	Likely D	September 28, 2022

==== Results ====
New York's 20th congressional district, 2022
Party	Candidate	Votes	%
Democratic	Paul Tonko	145,928	50.1
Working Families	Paul Tonko	14,492	5.0
Total	Paul Tonko (incumbent)	160,420	55.1
Republican	Liz Joy	110,903	38.1
Conservative	Liz Joy	19,966	6.8
Total	Liz Joy	130,869	44.9
Write-in		144	0.0
Total votes		291,433	100.0
Democratic hold			

== District 21 ==
2022 New York's 21st congressional district election
- November 8, 2022
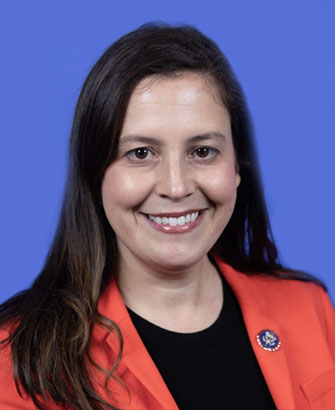

Nominee	Elise Stefanik	Matt Castelli
Party	Republican	Democratic
Alliance	Conservative	Moderate Party
Popular vote	168,579	116,421
Percentage	59.1%	40.8%
- Precinct results Stefanik: 50–60% 60–70% 70–80% 80–90% 90–100% Castelli: 50–60% 60–70% 70–80% 80–90% 90–100% Tie: 50%
U.S. Representative before election
Elise Stefanik
Republican
Elected U.S. Representative
Elise Stefanik
Republican

The 21st district is based in upstate New York encompassing the Adirondack Mountains and North Country regions. Also including Glens Falls, Lake George, Plattsburgh, Potsdam, Amsterdam, and Cooperstown. Redistricting added parts of the Mohawk Valley to the district while removing Watertown. The district had a PVI of R+9 and voted for Donald Trump by 12 points in 2020. The incumbent was Republican Elise Stefanik, who was reelected with 58.8% of the vote in 2020.

=== Republican nominee ===
- Elise Stefanik, incumbent U.S. representative and chair of the House Republican Conference

==== Withdrew ====
- Lonny William Koons, former paratrooper and truck driver

==== Endorsements ====
Elise Stefanik

Federal officials

- Mike Pompeo, former U.S. Secretary of State (2018–2021) and former Director of the CIA (2017–2018)

Organizations

- Citizens for Responsible Energy Solutions
- Maggie's List

=== Democratic primary ===
==== Candidates ====
===== Nominee =====
- Matt Castelli, former CIA officer

===== Eliminated in primary =====
- Matt Putorti, attorney

===== Did not make the ballot =====
- Ezra Watson

===== Withdrew =====
- Brigid "Bridie" Farrell, child victims advocate and former speedskater

==== Endorsements ====
Matt Castelli

U.S. representatives

- Bill Owens, former U.S. representative from New York's 21st congressional district (2009–2015)

==== Primary results ====
Democratic primary results
Party	Candidate	Votes	%
Democratic	Matt Castelli	18,949	81.1
Democratic	Matt Putorti	4,407	18.9
Total votes		23,356	100.0

=== General election ===
==== Predictions ====
Source	Ranking	As of
The Cook Political Report	Solid R	May 23, 2022
Inside Elections	Solid R	May 25, 2022
Sabato's Crystal Ball	Safe R	May 25, 2022
Politico	Solid R	May 27, 2022
RCP	Safe R	June 9, 2022
Fox News	Solid R	July 11, 2022
DDHQ	Solid R	July 20, 2022
FiveThirtyEight	Solid R	June 30, 2022
The Economist	Safe R	September 28, 2022

==== Results ====
New York's 21st congressional district, 2022
Party	Candidate	Votes	%
Republican	Elise Stefanik	150,595	52.8
Conservative	Elise Stefanik	17,984	6.3
Total	Elise Stefanik (incumbent)	168,579	59.1
Democratic	Matt Castelli	112,645	39.5
Moderate Party	Matt Castelli	3,776	1.3
Total	Matt Castelli	116,421	40.8
Write-in		95	0.0
Total votes		285,000	100.0
Republican hold			

== District 22 ==
2022 New York's 22nd congressional district election
- November 8, 2022
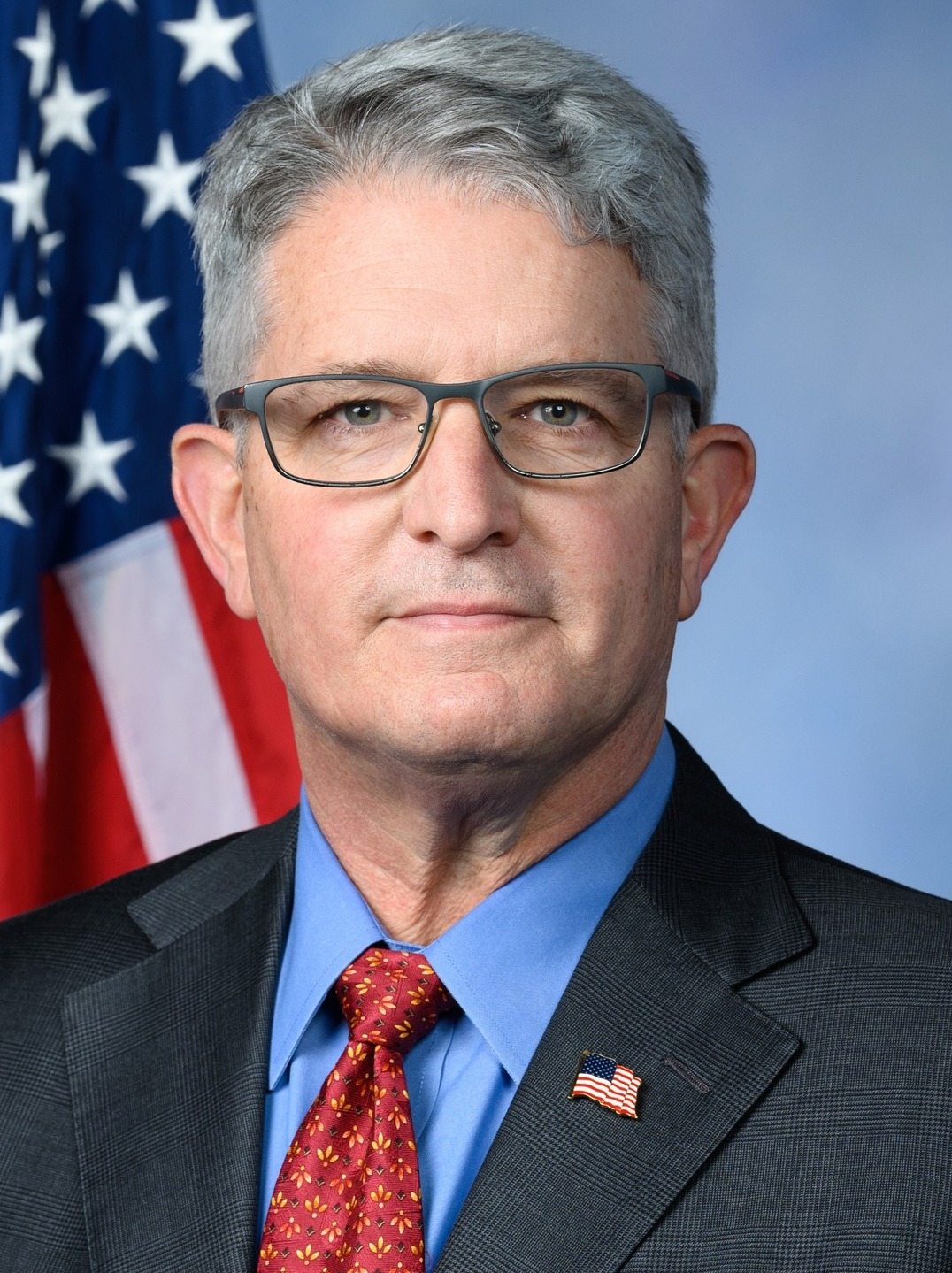

Nominee	Brandon Williams	Francis Conole
Party	Republican	Democratic
Alliance	Conservative
Popular vote	135,544	132,913
Percentage	50.5%	49.5%
- Precinct results Williams: 50–60% 60–70% 70–80% 80–90% Conole: 50–60% 60–70% 70–80% 80–90% 90–100% Tie: 40–50% 50% No results
U.S. Representative before election
John Katko
Republican
Elected U.S. Representative
Brandon Williams
Republican

The 22nd district is based in Central New York and the Mohawk Valley, including Syracuse and Utica. It includes all of Onondaga, Oneida, and Madison Counties and a small sliver of Oswego County. The district was significantly altered by redistricting, losing all of its previous territory in the Southern Tier while keeping Syracuse and also adding Utica. The district had a PVI of D+1 and voted for Joe Biden by 8 points in 2020, similar to the partisanship of the old 24th district. The incumbent, Republican John Katko of the 24th district, who was elected with 53.1% of the vote in 2020, decided to retire rather than run for reelection.

=== Republican primary ===
==== Nominee ====
- Brandon Williams, U.S. Navy veteran

==== Eliminated in primary ====
- Steve Wells, former prosecutor

==== Withdrawn ====
- Timothy Ko, physician assistant (endorsed Sigler)
- Mike Sigler, Tompkins County legislator (filed to run in the 23rd district, then withdrew) (endorsed Wells)

==== Declined ====
- John Katko, incumbent U.S. representative
- J. Ryan McMahon II, Onondaga County executive
- Claudia Tenney, incumbent U.S. representative (previously filed to run in the 23rd district, finally ran in the 24th district)
- Ben Walsh, mayor of Syracuse and son of former U.S. Representative James Walsh

==== Endorsements ====
Brandon Williams

Organizations

- Conservative Party of New York
Steve Wells

U.S. representatives

- Elise Stefanik, chair of the House Republican Conference (2021–present), U.S. representative from New York's 21st congressional district (2015–present)

==== Primary results ====
Republican primary results
Party	Candidate	Votes	%
Republican	Brandon Williams	14,129	57.7
Republican	Steve Wells	10,351	42.3
Total votes		24,480	100.0

=== Democratic primary ===
==== Nominee ====
- Francis Conole, commander in U.S. Navy Reserves and candidate for NY-24 in 2020

==== Eliminated in primary ====
- Sarah Klee Hood, U.S. Air Force veteran and economic developer
- Chol Majok, Syracuse City Councilor
- Samuel D. Roberts, former New York State Assemblyman

==== Withdrawn ====
- Vanessa Fajans-Turner, climate change activist

==== Polling ====
Poll source	Date(s) administered	Sample size	Margin of error	Francis Conole	Steven Holden	Sarah Klee Hood	Chol Majok	Josh Riley	Sam Roberts	Vanessa Fajans-Turner	Undecided
Global Strategy Group (D) (Note: Poll sponsored by Conole's campaign)	March 10–13, 2022	400 (LV)	± 4.9%	13%	3%	1%	3%	6%	7%	2%	65%

==== Endorsements ====
Francis Conole

State officials

- Kathy Hochul, 57th governor of New York

State legislators

- Al Stirpe, state assemblyman

Local officials

- Latoya Allen, member of the Syracuse common council
- Khalid Bey, member of the Syracuse common council
- Rasheada Caldwell, member-elect of the Syracuse common council
- Peggy Chase, Onondaga County legislator
- Terry Cuddy, Auburn city councilor
- Joe Driscoll, member of the Syracuse common council
- Linda Ervin, Onondaga County legislator
- Dan Farfaglia, Fulton common councilor-elect
- Charles Garland, Onondaga County legislator-elect
- Amir Gethers, member-elect of the Syracuse common council
- Patrick "Pat" Hogan, member of the Syracuse common council
- Mary Khun, Onondaga County legislator
- Bill Kinne, Onondaga County legislator
- Chris Legg, Skaneateles town councilor
- Marty Masterpole, Onondaga County comptroller
- Deb McCormick, Auburn city councilor
- Heidi Nightingale, Cayuga County legislator
- Rita Paniagua, member of the Syracuse common council
- Michael Quill, mayor of Auburn
- Chris Ryan, Onondaga County legislator minority leader
- Jennifer Schultz, member-elect of the Syracuse common council
- Mary Sennett, mayor of Skaneateles
- Ben Walsh, mayor of Syracuse (Independent)
- Vernon Williams, Onondaga County legislator

Organizations

- Cayuga County Democratic Committee
- League of Conservation Voters
- New Politics
- Onondaga County Democratic Committee
- Sierra Club
- Votevets.org

Labor unions

- Communications Workers of America District 1
- Ironworkers Local 60

==== Primary results ====
Results by county Conole: 40–50%; 60–70%; Hood: 40–50%

Democratic primary results
Party	Candidate	Votes	%
Democratic	Francis Conole	10,644	39.1
Democratic	Sarah Klee Hood	9,562	35.5
Democratic	Sam Roberts	3,543	13.2
Democratic	Chol Majok	3,186	11.8
Total votes		26,935	100.0

=== General election ===
==== Predictions ====
Source	Ranking	As of
The Cook Political Report	Tossup	May 23, 2022
Inside Elections	Tossup	October 7, 2022
Sabato's Crystal Ball	Lean R	October 26, 2022
Politico	Tossup	May 27, 2022
RCP	Lean R	October 4, 2022
Fox News	Lean R	October 25, 2022
DDHQ	Tossup	October 29, 2022
FiveThirtyEight	Lean R	November 4, 2022
The Economist	Tossup	November 1, 2022

==== Polling ====
Poll source	Date(s) administered	Sample size	Margin of error	Brandon Williams (R)	Francis Conole (D)	Other	Undecided
Spectrum News/Siena	October 27 – November 1, 2022	432 (LV)	± 5.0%	42%	46%	2% (Note: "Another candidate" and "Not going to vote" with 1%)	9%
Global Strategy Group (D)	October 24–27, 2022	400 (LV)	± 4.9%	43%	45%	-	13%
Spectrum News/Siena	September 22–28, 2022	453 (LV)	± 5.1%	45%	40%	2%	13%
Global Strategy Group (D)	September 15–19, 2022	400 (LV)	± 4.9%	42%	43%	–	15%
RMG Research	August 27 – September 2, 2022	400 (LV)	± 4.9%	43%	40%	3%	14%

Hypothetical polling

Generic Republican vs. generic Democrat

Poll source	Date(s) administered	Sample size	Margin of error	Generic Republican	Generic Democrat	Undecided
GQR (D) (Note: Poll sponsored by the House Majority PAC)	October 18, 2022	–	–	46%	48%	6%
Global Strategy Group (D)	September 15–19, 2022	400 (LV)	± 4.9%	43%	41%	17%

==== Results ====
New York's 22nd congressional district, 2022
Party	Candidate	Votes	%
Republican	Brandon Williams	116,529	43.4
Conservative	Brandon Williams	19,015	7.1
Total	Brandon Williams	135,544	50.5
Democratic	Francis Conole	132,913	49.5
Write-in		151	0.1
Total votes		268,608	100.0
Republican hold			

== District 23 ==
2022 New York's 23rd congressional district election
- November 8, 2022
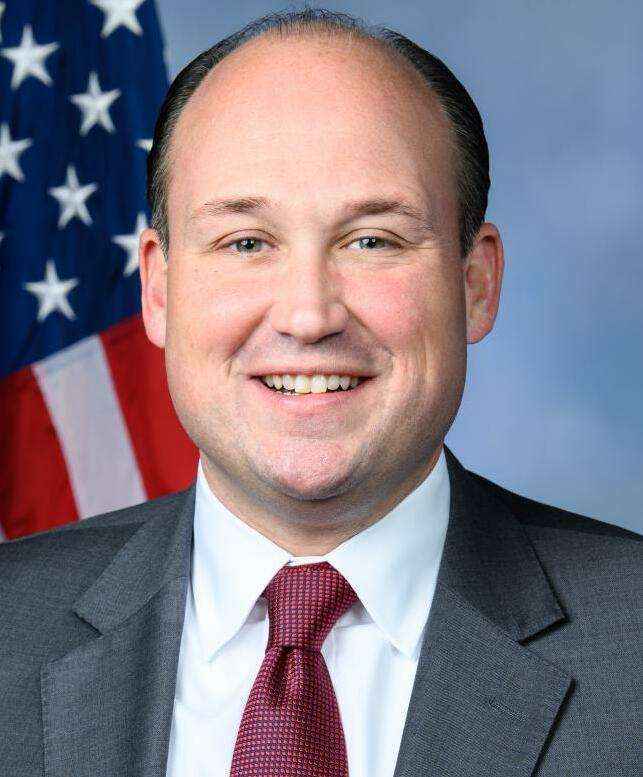

Nominee	Nick Langworthy	Max Della Pia
Party	Republican	Democratic
Alliance	Conservative
Popular vote	192,694	104,114
Percentage	64.9%	35.1%
- Precinct results Langworthy: 50–60% 60–70% 70–80% 80–90% 90–100% Della Pia: 50–60% 60–70% 70–80% 80–90% 90–100% Tie: 50% No results
U.S. Representative before election
Chris Jacobs
(Republican)
Joe Sempolinski
(Republican)
Elected U.S. Representative
Nick Langworthy
Republican

District 23 is based in the Southern Tier and Western New York, including Elmira, Corning, Jamestown, and outer Erie County. Due to redistricting, the district lost parts of the Finger Lakes such as Ithaca while picking up parts of Erie County formerly in the 27th district. The district had a PVI of R+12 and voted for Donald Trump by 17 points in 2020. The district's two incumbents, both Republicans, both declined to run for reelection: Joe Sempolinski, who was elected in August 2022 to fulfill the remaining term caused by Tom Reed's resignation, specifically ran for the seat as a placeholder and not as a permanent representative; and Chris Jacobs, of the old 27th district, announced that he would no longer seek election to the seat after his comments in support of gun control in the wake of the Robb Elementary School shooting upset many other Republicans and drew threats of primary challengers.

=== Republican primary ===
==== Nominee ====
- Nick Langworthy, chair of the New York Republican Party (2019–2023)

==== Eliminated in primary ====
- Carl Paladino, businessman, former Buffalo school board member (2013–2017), and nominee for governor in 2010

==== Disqualified ====
- Rich Moon, pharmacist (continued as a write-in candidate)

==== Withdrawn ====
- Marc Cenedella, CEO of Ladders, Inc.
- Chris Jacobs, incumbent representative of New York's 27th congressional district (the 27th district was eliminated following the 2020 census) (previously filed to run in the 24th district)
- Joe Sempolinski, incumbent U.S. representative from the 23rd district
- Mike Sigler, Tompkins County Legislator (previously filed to run in the 22nd district)
- Claudia Tenney, incumbent U.S. representative for New York's 22nd congressional district (running in the 24th district)

==== Declined ====
- Christopher Moss, Chemung County executive
- Tom Reed, incumbent U.S. representative (2010–2022)
- Catharine Young, former member of the New York State Senate for the 57th district

==== Endorsements ====
Nick Langworthy

U.S. representatives

- Jim Banks, U.S. representative from Indiana's 3rd congressional district (2017–present)
Carl Paladino

Executive branch officials

- Steve Bannon, former White House Chief Strategist and executive chair of Breitbart News

U.S. representatives

- Matt Gaetz, U.S. representative from FL-1 (2017–present)
- Elise Stefanik, U.S. representative from NY-21 (2015–present)
- Marjorie Taylor Greene, U.S. representative from Georgia's 14th congressional district (2021–present)

Local officials

- Rob Astorino, former Westchester County Executive (2010–2017), former member of the Westchester County Board of Legislators from the 3rd district (2003–2014), nominee for governor in 2014, candidate for New York's 40th State Senate district in 2020, candidate for governor in 2022

Organizations

- New York Young Republican Club
- Republicans for National Renewal
Joe Sempolinski (withdrawn)

U.S. representatives

- Tom Reed, U.S. representative from NY-23 (2010–2022)

==== Polling ====
Poll source	Date(s) administered	Sample size	Margin of error	Nick Langworthy	Carl Paladino	Undecided
Barry Zeplowitz & Associates (R)	August 1–2, 2022	400 (LV)	± 4.9%	39%	37%	24%
WPA Intelligence (R) (Note: Poll sponsored by Paladino's campaign)	July 9–11, 2022	604 (LV)	± 4.0%	24%	54%	22%

==== Primary results ====
Results by county Langworthy: 50–60%; 60–70%; Paladino: 60–70%

Republican primary results
Party	Candidate	Votes	%
Republican	Nick Langworthy	24,275	52.1
Republican	Carl Paladino	22,283	47.9
Total votes		46,558	100.0

=== Democratic nominee ===
- Max Della Pia, U.S. Air Force veteran, candidate in 2018, and nominee for this seat in the special election

==== Declined ====
- Anthony Brindisi, former U.S. representative for New York's 22nd congressional district (2019–2021)
- Tracy Mitrano, Democratic nominee for this district in 2018 and 2020

=== General election ===
==== Predictions ====
Source	Ranking	As of
The Cook Political Report	Solid R	May 23, 2022
Inside Elections	Solid R	May 25, 2022
Sabato's Crystal Ball	Safe R	May 25, 2022
Politico	Solid R	May 27, 2022
RCP	Safe R	June 9, 2022
Fox News	Solid R	July 11, 2022
DDHQ	Solid R	July 20, 2022
FiveThirtyEight	Solid R	June 30, 2022
The Economist	Safe R	September 28, 2022

==== Results ====
New York's 23rd congressional district, 2022
Party	Candidate	Votes	%
Republican	Nick Langworthy	163,000	54.9
Conservative	Nick Langworthy	29,694	10.0
Total	Nick Langworthy	192,694	64.9
Democratic	Max Della Pia	104,114	35.0
Write-in		233	0.1
Total votes		297,041	100.0
Republican hold			

== District 24 ==
2022 New York's 24th congressional district election
- November 8, 2022
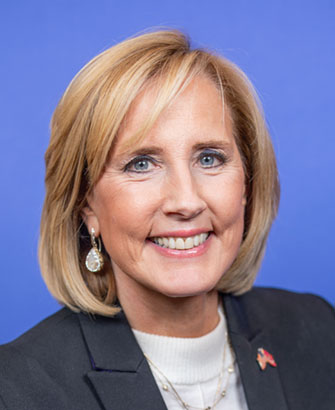

Nominee	Claudia Tenney	Steven Holden
Party	Republican	Democratic
Alliance	Conservative
Popular vote	182,054	95,028
Percentage	65.7%	34.3%
- Precinct results Tenney: 50–60% 60–70% 70–80% 80–90% 90–100% Holden: 50–60% 60–70% 70–80% 80–90% 90–100% Tie: 50%
U.S. Representative before election
Claudia Tenney
Republican
Elected U.S. Representative
Claudia Tenney
Republican

The 24th district is based along the Lake Ontario coast (minus Rochester) and the upper Finger Lakes, including Watertown, Oswego, Auburn, Seneca Falls, and Batavia. It was significantly altered by redistricting, taking in all of the old 27th district outside of Erie County while only retaining the rural parts of the old 24th district. The district had a PVI of R+12 and voted for Donald Trump by 17 points in 2020. Republican Claudia Tenney, the incumbent of the old 22nd district, ran in this district and won. In 2020 she was narrowly elected in the old 22nd with 47.8% of the vote.

=== Republican primary ===
==== Nominee ====
- Claudia Tenney, incumbent U.S. representative for New York's 22nd congressional district (previously filed to run in the 23rd district)

==== Eliminated in primary ====
- Mario Fratto, attorney and businessman
- George K. Phillips

===== Withdrawn =====
- Todd Aldinger, attorney (endorsed McCarthy)
- Chris Jacobs, incumbent representative of New York's 27th congressional district (the 27th district was eliminated following the 2020 census) (announced run in the 23rd district, then withdrew)
- Andrew McCarthy, intelligence analyst
- John Murtari, software engineer and former U.S. Air Force pilot

==== Endorsements ====
Claudia Tenney

Executive branch officials

- Donald Trump, 45th president of the United States (2017–2021)

U.S. representatives

- Elise Stefanik, chair of the House Republican Conference (2021–present), U.S. representative from NY-21 (2015–present)

State legislators

- Will Barclay, minority leader of the New York State Assembly (2020–present) and state assemblymember from the 120th district (2003–present)
- Ken Blankenbush, state assemblymember from the 117th district (2011–present)
- David DiPietro, state assemblymember from the 147th district (2013–present)
- Angelo Morinello, state assemblymember from the 145th district (2017–present)
- Michael Norris, state assemblymember from the 144th district (2017–present)
- Rob Ortt, minority leader of the New York State Senate (2020–present) and state senator from the 62nd district (2015–present)
- Mark Walczyk, state assemblymember from the 116th district (2019–present)

Individuals

- Jason McGuire, chair of the Livingston County Conservative Party

Organizations

- Maggie's List
- New York Federation of College Republicans

==== Polling ====
Poll source	Date(s) administered	Sample size	Margin of error	Mario Fratto	George Phillips	Claudia Tenney	Undecided
Public Opinion Strategies (R) (Note: Poll sponsored by Tenney's campaign)	July 24–26, 2022	300 (LV)	± 5.7%	6%	6%	52%	36%

==== Primary results ====
Results by county Tenney: 40–50%; 50–60%; 60–70%; 70–80%; Fratto: 50–60%

Republican primary results
Party	Candidate	Votes	%
Republican	Claudia Tenney (incumbent)	17,470	53.9
Republican	Mario Fratto	13,025	40.2
Republican	George Phillips	1,939	6.0
Total votes		32,434	100.0

=== Democratic nominee ===
- Steven Holden, veteran and businessman

=== General election ===
==== Predictions ====
Source	Ranking	As of
The Cook Political Report	Solid R	May 23, 2022
Inside Elections	Solid R	May 25, 2022
Sabato's Crystal Ball	Safe R	May 25, 2022
Politico	Solid R	May 27, 2022
RCP	Safe R	June 9, 2022
Fox News	Solid R	July 11, 2022
DDHQ	Solid R	July 20, 2022
FiveThirtyEight	Solid R	June 30, 2022
The Economist	Safe R	September 28, 2022

==== Endorsements ====
Steven Holden

Local officials

- Michael Quill, mayor of Auburn

==== Results ====
New York's 24th congressional district, 2022
Party	Candidate	Votes	%
Republican	Claudia Tenney	156,347	56.4
Conservative	Claudia Tenney	25,707	9.3
Total	Claudia Tenney (incumbent)	182,054	65.7
Democratic	Steven Holden	95,028	34.3
Write-in		171	0.1
Total votes		277,253	100.0
Republican hold			

== District 25 ==
2022 New York's 25th congressional district election
- November 8, 2022
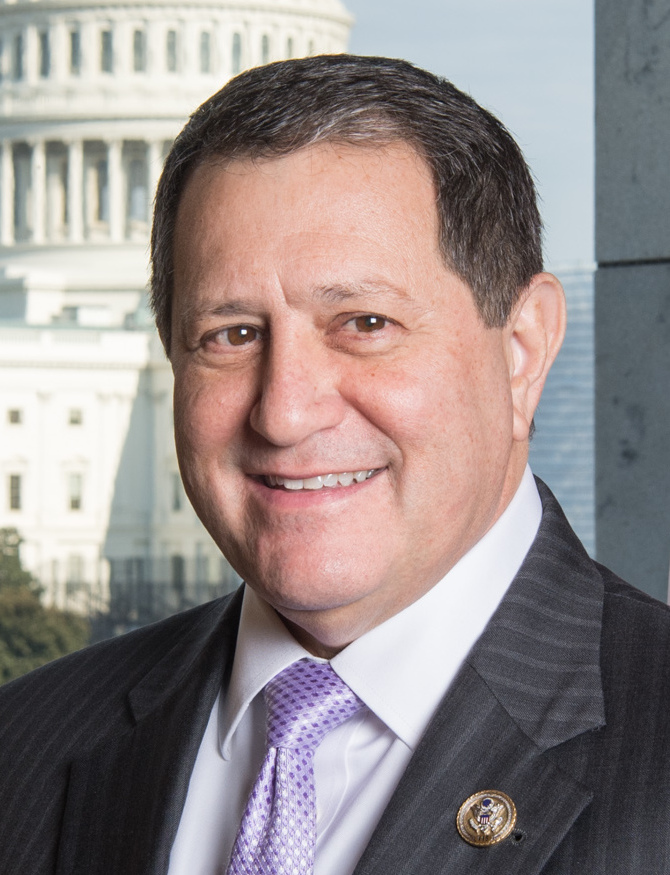

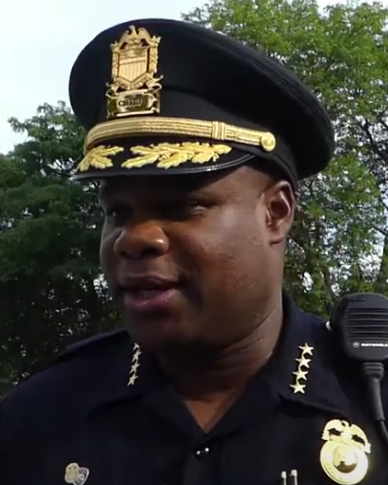
Nominee	Joseph Morelle	La'Ron Singletary
Party	Democratic	Republican
Alliance	Working Families	Conservative
Popular vote	152,022	130,190
Percentage	53.8%	46.1%
- Precinct results Morelle: 50–60% 60–70% 70–80% 80–90% 90–100% Singletary: 50–60% 60–70% 70–80% 80–90% Tie: 50% No results
U.S. Representative before election
Joseph Morelle
Democratic
Elected U.S. Representative
Joseph Morelle
Democratic

The 25th district is based in the Rochester area, including all of Monroe County and part of Orleans County. The district was mostly unchanged by redistricting. It had a PVI of D+7 and voted for Joe Biden by 21 points in 2020. The incumbent was Democrat Joseph Morelle, who was reelected with 59.3% of the vote in 2020.

=== Democratic nominee ===
- Joseph Morelle, incumbent U.S. representative

=== Republican nominee ===
- La'Ron Singletary, former Rochester police chief

==== Predictions ====
Source	Ranking	As of
The Cook Political Report	Likely D	November 1, 2022
Inside Elections	Likely D	November 3, 2022
Sabato's Crystal Ball	Likely D	October 26, 2022
Politico	Lean D	November 3, 2022
RCP	Tossup	November 1, 2022
Fox News	Likely D	July 11, 2022
DDHQ	Solid D	July 20, 2022
FiveThirtyEight	Solid D	June 30, 2022
The Economist	Likely D	November 1, 2022

==== Polling ====
Poll source	Date(s) administered	Sample size	Margin of error	Joseph Morelle (D)	La'Ron Singletary (R)	Undecided
Tarrance Group (R) (Note: Poll sponsored by Singletary's campaign)	October 11–13, 2022	465 (RV)	± 4.9%	43%	39%	18%

==== Debates ====
2022 New York's 25th congressional district debates
No.	Date	Host	Moderator	Link	Democratic	Republican
Key: P Participant A Absent N Not invited I Invited W Withdrawn						
Key: P Participant A Absent N Not invited I Invited W Withdrawn					Joseph Morelle	La'Ron Singletary
1	Oct. 3, 2022	League of Women Voters Rochester Metropolitan Area; WROC-TV	Adam Chodak		P	P
2	Oct. 28, 2022	WXXI-TV	Evan Dawson		P	P

==== Results ====
New York's 25th congressional district, 2022
Party	Candidate	Votes	%
Democratic	Joseph Morelle	139,875	49.5
Working Families	Joseph Morelle	12,147	4.3
Total	Joseph Morelle (incumbent)	152,022	53.8
Republican	La'Ron Singletary	108,010	38.2
Conservative	La'Ron Singletary	22,180	7.9
Total	La'Ron Singletary	130,190	46.1
Write-in		132	0.1
Total votes		282,344	100.0
Democratic hold			

== District 26 ==
2022 New York's 26th congressional district election
- November 8, 2022
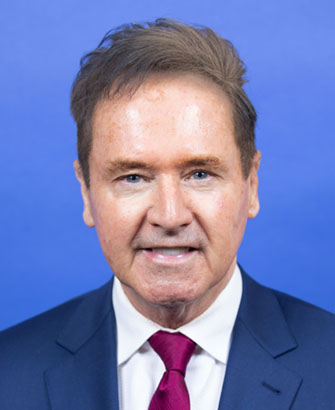

Nominee	Brian Higgins	Steven Sams
Party	Democratic	Republican
Alliance	Working Families	Conservative
Popular vote	156,883	88,339
Percentage	63.9%	36.0%
- Precinct results Higgins: 50–60% 60–70% 70–80% 80–90% 90–100% Sams: 50–60% 60–70% 70–80% Tie: 40–50% 50% No results
U.S. Representative before election
Brian Higgins
Democratic
Elected U.S. Representative
Brian Higgins
Democratic

The 26th district is based in the Buffalo-Niagara Falls area, including the more urban parts of Erie County and western Niagara County. The district was mostly unchanged by redistricting. It had a PVI of D+8 and voted for Joe Biden by 26 points in 2020. The incumbent was Democrat Brian Higgins, who was reelected with 69.8% of the vote in 2020.

=== Democratic primary ===
==== Candidates ====
===== Nominee =====
- Brian Higgins, incumbent U.S. representative

===== Eliminated in primary =====
- Emin "Eddie" Egriu, contractor

==== Primary results ====
Democratic primary results
Party	Candidate	Votes	%
Democratic	Brian Higgins (incumbent)	27,598	91.3
Democratic	Emin Egriu	2,628	8.7
Total votes		30,226	100.0

=== Republican nominee ===
- Steven L. Sams II, Afghanistan and Iraq veteran

=== General election ===
==== Predictions ====
Source	Ranking	As of
The Cook Political Report	Solid D	May 23, 2022
Inside Elections	Solid D	May 25, 2022
Sabato's Crystal Ball	Safe D	May 25, 2022
Politico	Solid D	May 27, 2022
RCP	Likely D	November 1, 2022
Fox News	Solid D	July 11, 2022
DDHQ	Solid D	July 20, 2022
FiveThirtyEight	Solid D	June 30, 2022
The Economist	Safe D	September 28, 2022

==== Endorsements ====
Brian Higgins

Organizations

- New York League of Conservation Voters
- Sierra Club

==== Results ====
New York's 26th congressional district, 2022
Party	Candidate	Votes	%
Democratic	Brian Higgins	141,942	57.8
Working Families	Brian Higgins	14,941	6.1
Total	Brian Higgins (incumbent)	156,883	63.9
Republican	Steven Sams	70,547	28.7
Conservative	Steven Sams	17,792	7.3
Total	Steven Sams	88,339	36.0
Write-in		149	0.1
Total votes		245,371	100.0
Democratic hold			

== Notes ==
Partisan clients
