= 2021 New York City Council election in Brooklyn =

The 2021 New York City Council elections in Brooklyn were held on November 2, 2021. The primary elections were held on June 22, 2021.

== District 33 ==
In the 33rd district, incumbent Democrat Stephen Levin was term-limited and could not run for a fourth consecutive term.

=== Democratic primary ===

Restler

20–30%
30–40%
40–50%
50–60%
60–70%
70–80%
80–90%
90–100%

Adams

20–30%
30–40%

Gates

30–40%

Potosky

70–80%

Other

20–30% tie

Restler

20–30%
30–40%
40–50%
50–60%
60–70%
70–80%
80–90%
90–100%

Adams

20–30%
30–40%

Gates

30–40%

Potosky

70–80%

Other

20–30% tie

Restler

20–30%
30–40%
40–50%
50–60%
60–70%
70–80%
80–90%
90–100%

Adams

20–30%
30–40%

Potosky

70–80%

Other

20–30% tie
30–40% tie

Restler

20–30%
30–40%
40–50%
50–60%
60–70%
70–80%
80–90%
90–100%

Adams

30–40%

Gates

30–40%

Potosky

70–80%

Other

30–40% tie

Restler

30–40%
40–50%
50–60%
60–70%
70–80%
80–90%
90–100%

Adams

30–40%
40–50%

Potosky

70–80%

Other

30–40% tie

Restler

50–60%
60–70%
70–80%
80–90%
90–100%

Adams

50–60%
60–70%

Other

50% tie

==== Candidates ====
- Elizabeth Adams, legislative director for Stephen Levin
- Victoria Cambranes, community organizer
- Sabrina Gates, graphic designer
- Toba Pototsky, activist
- Lincoln Restler, co-founder of New Kings Democrats
- Stu Sherman, attorney
- Ben Solotaire, community liaison for Stephen Levin
- April Somboun, marketing consultant

Withdrawn

- Glomani Bravo-Lopez, deputy chief of staff for Stephen Levin
- Jonathan Clarke
- Stephen Finley

=== Endorsements ===
Elizabeth Adams

State officials

- Jessica Ramos, state senator

Local officials

- Helen Rosenthal, NYC councilmember

Labor unions

- Freelancers Union

Organizations

- Indivisible Brooklyn
- Progressive Change Campaign Committee (co-endorsed with Restler)
- Run for Something
- Stonewall Democratic Club of New York City (second choice)
Victoria Cambranes

Labor unions

- International Alliance of Theatrical Stage Employees Local 798
- Laborers' International Union of North America
Lincoln Restler

Federal officials

- Nydia Velázquez, U.S. representative from New York's 7th congressional district

State officials

- Jabari Brisport, New York state senator for the 25th district
- Simcha Eichenstein, New York State Assemblymember for the 48th district
- Emily Gallagher, New York State Assemblymember for the 50th district
- Julia Salazar, New York state senator for the 18th district

Local officials

- Jumaane Williams, New York City public advocate

Individuals

- Cynthia Nixon, actress, former candidate for governor of New York in 2018
- Zephyr Teachout, attorney, professor, former candidate for governor of New York and attorney general of New York

Labor unions

- International Brotherhood of Teamsters Local 202
- Professional Staff Congress, CUNY
- SEIU 32BJ
- United Federation of Teachers

Organizations

- Citizens Union
- New York Communities for Change
- New York League of Conservation Voters
- Our Revolution
- Progressive Change Campaign Committee (co-endorsed with Adams)
- Run for Something
- Stonewall Democratic Club of New York City (first choice)
- Working Families Party
Stu Sherman

Labor unions

- United Auto Workers
April Somboun

State officials

- John Liu, state senator

Individuals

- Ray McGuire, former CitiGroup executive; candidate for mayor of New York in 2021

==== Results ====
2021 New York City Council District 33 Democratic primary results
Party	Candidate	Maximum round	Maximum votes	Share in maximum round	Maximum votes First round votes Transfer votes
Democratic	Lincoln Restler	7	16,537	63.0%	
Democratic	Elizabeth Adams	7	9,332	39.5%	
Democratic	Victoria Cambranes	6	2,435	8.6%	
Democratic	Sabrina Gates	6	1,940	6.9%	
Democratic	Toba Potosky	6	1,892	6.7%	
Democratic	April Somboun	5	1,588	5.5%	
Democratic	Stu Sherman	4	1,197	4.1%	
Democratic	Ben Solotaire	2	623	2.1%	
Write-in		1	102	0.3%	

=== General election ===
General election
Party	Candidate	Votes	%
Democratic	Lincoln Restler	21,077	98.4
Write-in		344	1.6
Total votes		21,421	100

== District 35 ==
In the 35th district, incumbent Democrat Laurie Cumbo was term-limited and could not run for a third consecutive term.

=== Democratic primary ===

Hudson

20–30%
30–40%
40–50%
50–60%
60–70%
70–80%
80–90%

Hollingsworth

20–30%
30–40%
40–50%
50–60%
60–70%

Collymore

30–40%

Other

30–40% tie
No votes

Hudson

20–30%
30–40%
40–50%
50–60%
60–70%
70–80%
80–90%

Hollingsworth

20–30%
30–40%
40–50%
50–60%
60–70%

Collymore

30–40%

Other

30–40% tie
No votes

Hudson

50–60%
60–70%
70–80%
80–90%
90–100%

Hollingsworth

50–60%
60–70%
70–80%

Other

50% tie
No votes

2021 New York City Council District 35 Democratic primary results
Party	Candidate	Maximum round	Maximum votes	Share in maximum round	Maximum votes First round votes Transfer votes
Democratic	Crystal Hudson	3	16,564	54.0%	
Democratic	Michael Hollingsworth	3	14,138	46.0%	
Democratic	Renee Collymore	2	4,438	12.7%	
Democratic	Curtis Harris	2	1,652	4.7%	
Democratic	Regina Kinsey	2	1,637	4.7%	
Democratic	Deirdre Levy	2	1,398	4.0%	
Democratic	Hector Robertson	2	504	1.4%	
Write-in		1	68	0.2%	

Withdrawn

- Alejandra Caraballo
- Terrance Knox
- Maayan Zik

=== Endorsements ===
Michael Hollingsworth

Federal legislators

- Bernie Sanders, U.S. senator from Vermont (2007–present)

State legislators

- Jabari Brisport, New York state senator for the 25th district
- Phara Souffrant Forrest, New York state assemblymember for the 57th district
- Zohran Mamdani, New York state assemblymember for the 36th district
- Marcela Mitaynes, New York state assemblymember for the 51st district
- Julia Salazar, New York state senator for the 18th district

Individuals

- Cynthia Nixon, activist, actress, and former candidate for governor of New York

Labor unions

- New York State Laborers' International Union of North America
- Professional Staff Congress, CUNY

Organizations

- Democratic Socialists of America
- Food & Water Action
- New York City Democratic Socialists of America
- Our Revolution (co-endorsed with Hudson)
- Sunrise Movement NYC
Crystal Hudson

Federal legislators

- Yvette Clarke, U.S. representative
- Hakeem Jeffries, House of Representatives member from Kings County (2013–present)

State legislators

- Jessica González-Rojas, New York State Assemblymember for the 34th district
- Jessica Ramos, New York state senator for the 13th district

Local officials

- Brad Lander, New York City councilmember
- Carlina Rivera, New York City councilmember for the 2nd District

Labor unions

- 1199SEIU United Healthcare Workers East
- District Council 37
- New York City Central Labor Council
- United Federation of Teachers

Individuals

- Maya Wiley, 2021 New York City mayoral candidate

Organizations

- Citizens Union
- Jim Owles Liberal Democratic Club
- LGBTQ Victory Fund
- Make the Road Action
- New York League of Conservation Voters
- Our Revolution (co-endorsed with Hollingsworth)
- Run for Something
- Stonewall Democratic Club of New York City

Newspapers and publications

- New York Amsterdam News

== District 36 ==
In the 36th district, incumbent Democrat Robert Cornegy was term-limited and could not run for a third consecutive term. He ran for Brooklyn borough president, but lost in the Democratic primary.

=== Democratic primary ===

Ossé

20–30%
30–40%
40–50%
50–60%

Butler

20–30%
30–40%
40–50%
50–60%

Moore

20–30%
30–40%
40–50%

Waterman

30–40%
40–50%

Other

20–30% tie

Ossé

30–40%
40–50%
50–60%
60–70%

Butler

30–40%
40–50%
50–60%
60–70%

Moore

30–40%
40–50%
60–70%

Other

30–40% tie

Ossé

50–60%
60–70%
70–80%
80–90%

Butler

50–60%
60–70%
70–80%
80–90%
90–100%

==== Candidates ====
- Henry Butler, manager of Brooklyn Community Board 3
- Regina Edwards, healthcare administrator
- John Joyner, entrepreneur
- Tahirah Moore, former staffer for Robert Cornegy
- Chi Ossé, activist
- Robert Waterman, pastor

Withdrawn

- Maya Cantrell
- Ronald Colter
- Gregory Green, retired NYPD sergeant
- Reginald Swiney
- Shadoe Tarver
- Jason Walker, activist

==== Endorsements ====
Henry Butler

Labor unions

- Communications Workers of America, District 1
- New York City Central Labor Council
- SEIU 32BJ
- Transport Workers Union of America Local 100
- United Federation of Teachers
Tahirah Moore

Organizations

- EMILY's List
- Our Revolution (co-endorsed with Chi Ossé)
- Working Families Party (co-endorsed with Chi Ossé)
Chi Ossé

Local officials

- Brad Lander, NYC councilman
- Jimmy Van Bramer, NYC councilman

Individuals

- Killer Mike, rapper

Labor unions

- Freelancers Union

Organizations

- Black Lives Matter PAC
- Citizen Action of New York
- Jim Owles Liberal Democratic Club
- LGBTQ Victory Fund
- Our Revolution (co-endorsed with Tahirah Moore)
- Run for Something
- Stonewall Democratic Club of New York City
- Working Families Party (co-endorsed with Tahirah Moore)
Jason Walker (withdrew)

Organizations

- New York Communities for Change
Robert Waterman

Federal officials

- Yvette Clarke, U.S. representative from NY-09

State officials

- Latrice Walker, state assemblymember

Local officials

- Alicka Ampry-Samuel, NYC councilmember
- Una S. T. Clarke, former NYC councilmember
- Laurie Cumbo, NYC councillmember

Individuals

- Ray McGuire, 2021 candidate for NYC mayor

==== Results ====
2021 New York City Council District 36 Democratic primary results
Party	Candidate	Maximum round	Maximum votes	Share in maximum round	Maximum votes First round votes Transfer votes
Democratic	Chi Ossé	4	11,149	57.0%	
Democratic	Henry Butler	4	8,402	43.0%	
Democratic	Tahirah Moore	3	6,196	23.9%	
Democratic	Robert Waterman	2	3,281	12.1%	
Democratic	Reginald Swiney	2	628	2.7%	
Write-in		1	86	0.2%	

== District 37 ==
The incumbent in the 37th district was Democrat Rafael Espinal, who resigned before his term was up. Darma Diaz was elected without opposition, and would serve the remainder of his term. She ran for a full term, but lost the Democratic primary to Sandy Nurse.

=== Democratic primary ===

Nurse

30–40%
40–50%
50–60%
60–70%
70–80%
80–90%
90–100%

Diaz

30–40%
40–50%
50–60%
60–70%

Abdin

30–40%
40–50%
60–70%
70–80%
90–100%

Durosinmi

40–50%

Other

30–40% tie
No votes

Nurse

30–40%
40–50%
50–60%
60–70%
70–80%
80–90%
90–100%

Diaz

30–40%
40–50%
50–60%
60–70%

Abdin

30–40%
40–50%
60–70%
70–80%
90–100%

Durosinmi

40–50%

Other

30–40% tie
No votes

Nurse

30–40%
40–50%
50–60%
60–70%
70–80%
80–90%
90–100%

Diaz

30–40%
40–50%
50–60%
60–70%

Abdin

30–40%
40–50%
60–70%
70–80%
90–100%

Other

50% tie
No votes

Nurse

50–60%
60–70%
70–80%
80–90%
90–100%

Diaz

50–60%
60–70%
70–80%

Other

No votes

==== Candidates ====
- Misba Abdin, businessman
- Darma Diaz, incumbent councillor
- Christopher Durosinmi, former vice president of the Glenmore Tenants Association
- Rick Echevarria, former Department of Housing Preservation official
- Heriberto Mateo, candidate for City Council in 2013
- Sandy Nurse, activist and carpenter

==== Endorsements ====
Darma Diaz

State legislators

- Rodneyse Bichotte, New York State Assemblymember for the 42nd district

Labor unions

- United Federation of Teachers

Organizations

- EMILY's List
Sandy Nurse

Federal legislators

- Alexandria Ocasio-Cortez, U.S. representative for New York's 14th congressional district
- Nydia Velázquez, U.S. representative from New York's 7th congressional district

State legislators

- Maritza Davila, New York State Assemblymember for the 53rd district
- Jessica Ramos, New York state senator for New York's 13th State Senate district
- Julia Salazar, New York state senator for New York's 18th State Senate district

Local officials

- Antonio Reynoso, New York City councilmember for the 34th District
- Carlina Rivera, New York City councilmember for the 2nd District

Labor unions

- 1199SEIU United Healthcare Workers East
- Communications Workers of America, District 1
- District Council 37
- Professional Staff Congress, CUNY
- SEIU 32BJ

Organizations

- Jim Owles Liberal Democratic Club
- Make the Road Action
- New York League of Conservation Voters
- Our Revolution
- Run for Something
- Sunrise Movement NYC
- Working Families Party

Newspapers and publications

- The Indypendent

==== Results ====
2021 New York City Council District 37 Democratic primary results
Party	Candidate	Maximum round	Maximum votes	Share in maximum round	Maximum votes First round votes Transfer votes
Democratic	Sandy Nurse	5	6,124	65.4%	
Democratic	Darma Diaz (incumbent)	5	3,247	34.6%	
Democratic	Misba Abdin	4	1,154	11.0%	
Democratic	Heriberto Mateo	4	1,071	10.2%	
Democratic	Rick Echevarria	2	558	5.1%	
Democratic	Christopher Durosinmi	2	340	3.1%	
Write-in		1	25	0.2%	

=== General election ===
General election
Party	Candidate	Votes	%
Democratic	Sandy Nurse	8,884	86.5
Republican	Franklin Gonzalez	1,369	13.3
Write-in		20	0.2
Total votes		10,273	100

== District 38 ==
In the 38th district, incumbent Democrat Carlos Menchaca was term-limited and could not run for a third consecutive term. He filed to run for mayor of New York City, but withdrew.

=== Democratic primary ===

Avilés

20–30%
30–40%
40–50%
50–60%
60–70%
70–80%
90–100%

Lin

30–40%
40–50%
50–60%
60–70%
70–80%
80–90%
90–100%

Camarena

90–100%

Painter

30–40%
40–50%
50–60%
90–100%

Zuniga

30–40%
90–100%

Other

30–40% tie
No votes

Avilés

30–40%
40–50%
50–60%
60–70%
70–80%
90–100%

Lin

30–40%
40–50%
50–60%
60–70%
70–80%
80–90%
90–100%

Camarena

90–100%

Painter

40–50%
50–60%
90–100%

Zuniga

30–40%
90–100%

Other

No votes

Avilés

30–40%
40–50%
50–60%
60–70%
70–80%
90–100%

Lin

30–40%
40–50%
50–60%
60–70%
70–80%
80–90%
90–100%

Camarena

90–100%

Painter

40–50%
50–60%
90–100%

Other

30–40% tie
No votes

Avilés

50–60%
60–70%
70–80%
80–90%
90–100%

Lin

50–60%
60–70%
70–80%
80–90%
90–100%

Other

50% tie
No votes

=== Candidates ===
- Alexa Avilés, public education advocate
- Rodrigo Camarena, activist
- Yu Lin, adult day care operator
- Jacqui Painter, activist
- Victor Swinton, NYPD officer
- Cesar Zuniga, member of Brooklyn Community Board 7

Withdrawn

- Ronald Ferdinand
- Erik Frankel, businessman
- Whitney Hu
- Samuel Sierra

=== Endorsements ===
Alexa Avilés

Federal legislators

- Alexandria Ocasio-Cortez, U.S. representative for New York's 14th congressional district
- Bernie Sanders, U.S. senator from Vermont
- Nydia Velázquez, U.S. representative for New York's 7th congressional district

State legislators

- Jabari Brisport, New York state senator for the 25th district
- Phara Souffrant Forrest, New York State Assemblymember for the 57th district
- Marcela Mitaynes, New York State Assemblymember for the 51st district

Local officials

- Carlina Rivera, New York City councilmember for the 2nd District

Individuals

- Cynthia Nixon, activist, actress, and former candidate for governor of New York

Labor unions

- Communications Workers of America, District 1
- District Council 37
- New York City Central Labor Council
- Professional Staff Congress, CUNY
- SEIU 32BJ
- United Federation of Teachers

Organizations

- Democratic Socialists of America
- New York Communities for Change
- New York League of Conservation Voters
- Stonewall Democratic Club of New York City (second choice)
- Sunrise Movement NYC
- Working Families Party

Newspapers and publications

- The Indypendent (first choice)
Rodrigo Camarena

Newspapers and publications

- The Indypendent (second choice)
Jacqueline Painter

Organizations;

- Stonewall Democratic Club of New York City (first choice)
Cesar Zuniga

Labor unions

- Laborers' International Union of North America

Newspapers and publications

- The Indypendent (third choice)

=== Results ===
2021 New York City Council District 38 Democratic primary results
Party	Candidate	Maximum round	Maximum votes	Share in maximum round	Maximum votes First round votes Transfer votes
Democratic	Alexa Avilés	5	6,857	65.1%	
Democratic	Yu Lin	5	3,683	34.9%	
Democratic	Rodrigo Camarena	4	1,619	14.0%	
Democratic	Jacqui Painter	4	1,462	12.6%	
Democratic	Cesar Zuniga	3	1,154	9.7%	
Democratic	Victor Swinton	2	491	4.1%	
Write-in		1	33	0.3%	

=== General election ===
General election
Party	Candidate	Votes	%
Democratic	Alexa Aviles	9,228	80.4
Conservative	Erik Frankel	1,943	16.9
Libertarian	Erik Frankel	266	2.3
Total	Erik Frankel	2,209	19.2
Write-in		46	0.4
Total votes		11,483	100

== District 39 ==
In the 39th district, incumbent Democrat Brad Lander was term-limited and could not run for a fourth consecutive term. He filed to run for New York City comptroller.

=== Democratic primary ===

Hanif

20–30%
30–40%
40–50%
50–60%

West

20–30%
30–40%
40–50%
50–60%

Krebs

20–30%
30–40%
90–100%

Schneider

40–50%
50–60%
60–70%
70–80%
80–90%

Haq

20–30%

Other

20–30% tie
30–40% tie
40–50% tie
No votes

Hanif

20–30%
30–40%
40–50%
50–60%

West

20–30%
30–40%
40–50%
50–60%

Krebs

20–30%
30–40%
90–100%

Schneider

40–50%
50–60%
60–70%
70–80%
80–90%

Haq

20–30%

Other

20–30% tie
30–40% tie
40–50% tie
No votes

Hanif

20–30%
30–40%
40–50%
50–60%
60–70%
70–80%

West

20–30%
30–40%
40–50%
50–60%

Krebs

20–30%
30–40%
90–100%

Schneider

50–60%
60–70%
70–80%
80–90%

Other

20–30% tie
30–40% tie
40–50% tie
No votes

Hanif

20–30%
30–40%
40–50%
50–60%
60–70%
70–80%
80–90%

West

30–40%
40–50%
50–60%

Krebs

30–40%
90–100%

Schneider

50–60%
60–70%
70–80%
80–90%

Other

20–30% tie
30–40% tie
40–50% tie
No votes

Hanif

30–40%
40–50%
50–60%
60–70%
70–80%
80–90%

West

30–40%
40–50%
50–60%
60–70%

Krebs

30–40%
40–50%
50–60%
60–70%
70–80%
80–90%
90–100%

Other

30–40% tie
40–50% tie
No votes

Hanif

50–60%
60–70%
70–80%
80–90%

West

50–60%
60–70%
70–80%
90–100%

Other

50% tie
No votes

==== Candidates ====
- Shahana Hanif, former director of community organizing for Brad Lander
- Mamnun Haq, healthcare worker
- Justin Krebs, co-founder of The Tank
- Bridget Rein, lobbyist
- Douglas Schneider, attorney
- Jessica Simmons, educator
- Brandon West, Office of Management and Budget worker

Withdrawn

- Jennifer DeLuca
- Nicole Hunt, activist
- Patrick Johnson, teacher and labor unionist

==== Endorsements ====
Shahana Hanif

Federal legislators

- Alexandria Ocasio-Cortez, U.S. representative for New York's 14th congressional district (2019–present) (co-endorsed with West)

State legislators

- Jessica Ramos, New York state senator for the 13th district

Organizations

- New York Communities for Change (joint with West)
- Our Revolution
- Run for Something
- Stonewall Democratic Club of New York City (second choice)
- Sunrise Movement NYC
- Working Families Party

Newspapers and publications

- The Indypendent (second choice)
Justin Krebs

Organizations

- New York League of Conservation Voters

Newspapers and publications

- The Indypendent (third choice)
Briget Rein

Labor unions

- Retail, Wholesale and Department Store Union
- United Federation of Teachers

Organizations

- Stonewall Democratic Club of New York City (first choice)

Newspapers and publications

- The Jewish Press
- New York Amsterdam News
Brandon West

Federal legislators

- Alexandria Ocasio-Cortez, U.S. representative for New York's 14th congressional district (2019–present) (co-endorsed with Hanif)

State legislators

- Jabari Brisport, New York state senator for the 25th district
- Phara Souffrant Forrest, New York state assemblymember for the 57th district
- Zohran Mamdani, New York state assemblymember for the 36th district
- Marcela Mitaynes, New York state assemblymember for the 51st district
- Julia Salazar, New York state senator for the 18th district

Individuals

- Cynthia Nixon, activist, actress, and former candidate for governor of New York
- Zephyr Teachout, attorney, professor, former candidate for governor of New York and attorney general of New York

Labor unions

- Communications Workers of America District 1
- Professional Staff Congress, CUNY

Organizations

- Citizens Union
- Democratic Socialists of America
- New York City Democratic Socialists of America
- New York Communities for Change (joint with Hanif)

Newspapers and publications

- The Indypendent (first choice)

==== Results ====
2021 New York City Council District 39 Democratic primary results
Party	Candidate	Maximum round	Maximum votes	Share in maximum round	Maximum votes First round votes Transfer votes
Democratic	Shahana Hanif	6	15,980	57.0%	
Democratic	Brandon West	6	12,059	43.0%	
Democratic	Justin Krebs	5	8,913	27.6%	
Democratic	Douglas Schneider	4	5,854	17.1%	
Democratic	Bridget Rein	3	2,634	7.4%	
Democratic	Jessica Simmons	3	1,634	4.6%	
Democratic	Mamnun M. Haq	2	1,460	4.0%	
Write-in		1	90	0.2%	

=== Libertarian primary ===
Libertarian primary
Party	Candidate	Votes	%
Libertarian	Matthew Morgan		
Total votes			100

=== General election ===
General election
Party	Candidate	Votes	%
Democratic	Shahana Hanif	25,306	74.2
Independent	Shahana Hanif	5,090	14.9
Total	Shahana Hanif	30,396	89.1
Conservative	Brett Wynkoop	2,657	7.8
Libertarian	Matthew Morgan	939	2.8
Write-in		134	0.4
Total votes		34,126	100

== District 40 ==
In the 40th district, incumbent Democrat Mathieu Eugene was term-limited and could not run for a third consecutive term.

=== Democratic primary ===

Joseph

20–30%
30–40%
40–50%

Pierre

10–20%
20–30%
30–40%
40–50%

Handy-Hilliard

20–30%
30–40%
40–50%

Morris

10–20%
30–40%

Morgan

20–30%

Other

20–30% tie
No votes

Joseph

20–30%
30–40%
40–50%

Pierre

20–30%
30–40%
40–50%

Handy-Hilliard

20–30%
30–40%
40–50%

Morris

10–20%
30–40%

Morgan

20–30%

Other

20–30% tie
No votes

Joseph

20–30%
30–40%
40–50%

Pierre

20–30%
30–40%
40–50%

Handy-Hilliard

20–30%
30–40%
40–50%

Morris

10–20%
30–40%

Morgan

20–30%

Other

20–30% tie
No votes

Joseph

20–30%
30–40%
40–50%

Pierre

20–30%
30–40%
40–50%

Handy-Hilliard

20–30%
30–40%
40–50%

Morris

10–20%
30–40%

Other

20–30% tie
30–40% tie
No votes

Joseph

20–30%
30–40%
40–50%

Pierre

20–30%
30–40%
40–50%

Handy-Hilliard

20–30%
30–40%
40–50%

Morris

20–30%
30–40%

Other

20–30% tie
30–40% tie
No votes

Joseph

20–30%
30–40%
40–50%
50–60%

Pierre

20–30%
30–40%
40–50%

Handy-Hilliard

20–30%
30–40%
40–50%

Morris

20–30%
30–40%

Other

30–40% tie
No votes

Joseph

20–30%
30–40%
40–50%
50–60%

Pierre

20–30%
30–40%
40–50%

Handy-Hilliard

20–30%
30–40%
40–50%

Morris

20–30%
30–40%

Other

30–40% tie
No votes

Joseph

20–30%
30–40%
40–50%
50–60%

Pierre

20–30%
30–40%
40–50%

Handy-Hilliard

20–30%
30–40%
40–50%

Other

20–30% tie
30–40% tie
No votes

Joseph

30–40%
40–50%
50–60%
60–70%

Pierre

30–40%
40–50%
50–60%

Handy-Hilliard

30–40%
40–50%
50–60%

Other

30–40% tie
40–50% tie
No votes

Joseph

50–60%
60–70%
70–80%

Pierre

50–60%
60–70%

Other

50% tie
No votes

==== Candidates ====
- Cecilia Cortez, vice-president of the Ditmas Park West Association
- Maxi Eugene, brother of Mathieu Eugene
- Kenya Handy-Hilliard, political staffer
- Harriet Hines, member of the Brooklyn Democratic Committee
- Victor Jordan, attorney and economist
- Rita Joseph, educator
- Vivia Morgan, president of the Friends of Wingate Park
- Blake Morris, attorney
- Josue Pierre, district leader for the 42nd Assembly District
- Edwin Raymond, NYPD officer and whistleblower
- John Williams, minister

Withdrawn

- David Alexis
- Brian Cunningham, former chief of staff to Laurie Cumbo

==== Endorsements ====
Kenya Handy-Hilliard

Federal officials

- Yvette Clarke, U.S. representative from NY-09

Organizations

- Run for Something

Newspapers and publications

- The Haitian Times (third choice)
Rita Joseph

Individuals

- Zephyr Teachout, attorney; candidate for governor of New York in 2014

Labor unions

- 1199SEIU United Healthcare Workers East

Organizations

- Jim Owles Liberal Democratic Club
- Make the Road Action
- Progressive Change Campaign Committee

Newspapers and publications

- The Haitian Times (first choice)
Josue Pierre

State officials

- Rodneyse Bichotte, state assemblywoman

Labor unions

- Communications Workers of America District 1
- International Brotherhood of Teamsters Local 237
- New York Communities for Change
- Professional Staff Congress
- Retail, Wholesale and Department Store Union
- Sheet Metal Workers' International Association Local 28
- United Federation of Teachers

Organizations

- Planned Parenthood of Greater New York Action Fund
- Stonewall Democratic Club of New York City

Newspapers and publications

- The Haitian Times (second choice)
- The Jewish Press
- New York Amsterdam News
Edwin Raymond

Local officials

- Jumaane Williams, New York City public advocate

Newspapers and publications

- The Haitian Times (fourth choice)

==== Results ====
2021 New York City Council District 40 Democratic primary results
Party	Candidate	Maximum round	Maximum votes	Share in maximum round	Maximum votes First round votes Transfer votes
Democratic	Rita Joseph	10	10,065	59.6%	
Democratic	Josue Pierre	10	6,829	40.4%	
Democratic	Kenya Handy-Hilliard	9	5,620	29.5%	
Democratic	Edwin Raymond	8	2,265	10.9%	
Democratic	Cecilia Cortez	8	2,221	10.7%	
Democratic	Blake Morris	7	1,368	6.5%	
Democratic	Maxi Eugene	6	1,175	5.4%	
Democratic	Harriet Hines	5	817	3.7%	
Democratic	John Williams	4	705	3.2%	
Democratic	Vivia Morgan	3	428	1.9%	
Democratic	Victor Jordan	2	344	1.5%	
Write-in		1	60	0.3%	

== District 41 ==
In the 41st district, incumbent Alicka Ampry-Samuel lost renomination to her predecessor, Darlene Mealy.

=== Democratic primary ===

Mealy

50–60%
60–70%
70–80%
90–100%

Ampry-Samuel

40–50%
50–60%
60–70%

Other

50% tie
No votes

==== Candidates ====
- Alicka Ampry-Samuel, incumbent councillor
- Darlene Mealy, former councillor

==== Endorsements ====
Alicka Ampry-Samuel

Federal legislators

- Yvette Clarke, U.S. representative
- Hakeem Jeffries, U.S. representative

Organizations

- EMILY's List
- Stonewall Democratic Club of New York City
- United Federation of Teachers
- Working Families Party

Newspapers and publications

- New York Amsterdam News

==== Results ====
Democratic primary
Party	Candidate	Votes	%
Democratic	Darlene Mealy	8,849	57.3
Democratic	Alicka Ampry-Samuel (incumbent)	6,507	42.1
Democratic	Write-ins	91	0.6
Total votes		13,441	100

=== Green primary ===
Green primary
Party	Candidate	Votes	%
Green	Scott Hutchins		

=== General election ===
General election
Party	Candidate	Votes	%
Democratic	Darlene Mealy	15,911	95.5
Green	Scott Hutchins	694	4.2
Write-in		51	0.3
Total votes		16,656	100

== District 42 ==
In the 42nd district, incumbent Democrat Inez Barron was term-limited and could not run for a third consecutive term.

=== Democratic primary ===

Barron

30–40%
40–50%
50–60%
60–70%
90–100%

Lucas

30–40%
40–50%
50–60%
60–70%

Florentino

30–40%

Other

30–40% tie
40–50% tie
No votes

Barron

30–40%
40–50%
50–60%
60–70%
90–100%

Lucas

30–40%
40–50%
50–60%
60–70%

Florentino

30–40%

Other

30–40% tie
40–50% tie
No votes

Barron

50–60%
60–70%
70–80%
90–100%

Lucas

50–60%
60–70%
70–80%

Other

50% tie
No votes

2021 New York City Council District 42 Democratic primary results
Party	Candidate	Maximum round	Maximum votes	Share in maximum round	Maximum votes First round votes Transfer votes
Democratic	Charles Barron	3	7,979	53.7%	
Democratic	Nikki Lucas	3	6,868	46.3%	
Democratic	Wilfredo Florentino	2	1,591	10.2%	
Democratic	Gena Watson	2	788	5.1%	
Write-in		1	56	0.8%	

Withdrawn

- Marlon Powell

=== Endorsements ===
Charles Barron

Labor unions

- Professional Staff Congress

Organizations

- New York Communities for Change

Newspapers and publications

- New York Amsterdam News
Wilfredo Florentino

Organizations

- LGBTQ Victory Fund
- Run for Something
- Stonewall Democratic Club of New York City
Nikki Lucas

Federal officials

- Hakeem Jeffries, U.S. representative for NY-08
- Edolphus Towns, former U.S. representative from NY-10

State officials

- Roxanne Persaud, state senator

Labor unions

- United Federation of Teachers

Organizations

- EMILY's List

== District 43 ==
In the 43rd district, incumbent Democrat Justin Brannan narrowly won re-election over Republican challenger Brian Fox. Fox surprised political observers with a narrow lead on election night, but Brennan overtook him after 1,600 absentee ballots were counted.

=== Democratic primary ===
Incumbent Justin Brannan won the Democratic nomination unopposed.

=== Republican primary ===
- Brian Fox

=== General election ===
General election
Party	Candidate	Votes	%
Democratic	Justin Brannan (incumbent)	10,828	44.9%
Working Families	Justin Brannan (incumbent)	1,062	4.4%
Total	Justin Brannan (incumbent)	12,917	50.3%
Republican	Brian Fox	11,001	45.7%
Conservative	Brian Fox	1,134	4.7%
Total	Brian Fox	12,718	49.5%
Write-in		41	0.2%
Total votes		25,676	100.0%

=== Endorsements ===
Justin L. Brannan

Labor unions

- United Federation of Teachers

Organizations

- Our Revolution
- Stonewall Democratic Club of New York City
- Working Families Party
Brian Fox

Organizations

- New York Young Republican Club

== District 44 ==
In the 44th district, incumbent Kalman Yeger won re-election unopposed.

=== Democratic primary ===
Kalman Yeger won the Democratic primary unopposed.

=== General election ===
Kalman Yeger won re-election unopposed .

General election
Party	Candidate	Votes	%
Democratic	Kalman Yeger (incumbent)	4,153	34.5%
Republican	Kalman Yeger	6,678	55.5%
Conservative	Kalman Yeger	924	7.6%
Total	Kalman Yeger (incumbent)	12,021	97.7%
Write-in		266	2.2%
Total votes		12,287	100

=== Endorsements ===
Kalman Yeger

Organizations

- United Federation of Teachers

== District 45 ==
In the 45th district, incumbent Democrat Farah Louis won re-election.

=== Democratic primary ===

Louis

50–60%
60–70%
70–80%
80–90%
90–100%

Other

No votes

Results by precinct

Democratic primary
Party	Candidate	Votes	%
Democratic	Farah Louis (incumbent)	14,544	75.4
Democratic	Anthony Beckford	3,819	19.8
Democratic	Cyril Joseph	818	4.2
Democratic	Write-ins	116	0.6
Total votes		19,297	100

=== Endorsements ===
Anthony Beckford

Organizations

- New York Communities for Change

Newspapers and publications

- The Haitian Times (first choice)
Farah Louis

Labor unions

- United Federation of Teachers

Organizations

- EMILY's List
- Stonewall Democratic Club of New York City

Newspapers and publications

- The Haitian Times (second choice)
- The Jewish Press

== District 46 ==
In the 46th district, incumbent Democrat Alan Maisel was term-limited and could not run for a third consecutive term.

=== Democratic primary ===

Narcisse

20–30%
30–40%
40–50%
50–60%
60–70%

Paul

20–30%

Brazela

30–40%

Cranston

20–30%
30–40%
40–50%
50–60%
60–70%
70–80%

Willabus

30–40%

Other

10–20% tie
No votes

Narcisse

20–30%
30–40%
40–50%
50–60%
60–70%

Paul

20–30%

Brazela

30–40%

Cranston

20–30%
30–40%
40–50%
50–60%
60–70%
70–80%

Willabus

30–40%

Other

10–20% tie
No votes

Narcisse

20–30%
30–40%
40–50%
50–60%
60–70%

Paul

20–30%

Brazela

40–50%

Cranston

20–30%
30–40%
40–50%
50–60%
60–70%
70–80%

Willabus

30–40%

Other

No votes

Narcisse

20–30%
30–40%
40–50%
50–60%
60–70%

Paul

20–30%

Brazela

40–50%

Cranston

20–30%
30–40%
40–50%
50–60%
60–70%
70–80%
80–90%

Other

No votes

Narcisse

30–40%
40–50%
50–60%
60–70%
70–80%

Paul

20–30%
30–40%

Brazela

40–50%

Cranston

30–40%
40–50%
50–60%
60–70%
70–80%
80–90%

Other

30–40% tie
No votes

Narcisse

30–40%
40–50%
50–60%
60–70%
70–80%

Paul

30–40%
40–50%
50–60%

Brazela

30–40%
40–50%
50–60%
60–70%

Other

30–40% tie
40–50% tie
No votes

Narcisse

50–60%
60–70%
70–80%
80–90%

Paul

50–60%
60–70%
70–80%

Other

No votes

==== Candidates ====
- Gardy Brazela, member of Brooklyn Community Board 18
- Donald Cranston, businessman and consultant
- Zuri Jackson, educator
- Mercedes Narcisse, nurse and activist
- Judy Newton, former NYPD officer
- Shirley Paul, attorney
- Tiffany Pryor, staffer for Cyrus Vance Jr.
- Dimple Willabus, businesswoman

Withdrawn

- Osamede Inerhunwunwa
- Stanley Scutt
- Nicholas Sterlacci

==== Endorsements ====
Gardy Brazela

Federal officials

- Hakeem Jeffries, U.S. representative

State officials

- Roxanne Persaud, state senator
- Frank Seddio, former state assemblyman (co-endorsed with Newton)
- Jaime Williams, state assemblywoman

Local officials

- Alan Maisel, NYC councilman
Donald Cranston

Labor unions

- Correction Officers' Benevolent Association

Newspapers and publications

- The Jewish Press
Mercedes Narcisse

State officials

- N. Nick Perry, state assemblyman

Municipal officials

- Bill de Blasio, mayor of New York
- Jumaane Williams, New York public advocate

Labor unions

- 1199SEIU United Healthcare Workers East

Organizations

- Make the Road Action
Judy Newton

State officials

- Frank Seddio, former state assemblyman (co-endorsed with Brazela)

Local officials

- Alan Maisel, NYC councilman
Shirley Paul

State officials

- Kathy Hochul, lieutenant governor of New York
- Carl McCall, former New York State comptroller

Labor unions

- Retail, Wholesale and Department Store Union
- United Federation of Teachers

Organizations

- Stonewall Democratic Club of New York City

Newspapers

- The Haitian Times (first choice)
- New York Amsterdam News

==== Results ====
2021 New York City Council District 46 Democratic primary results
Party	Candidate	Maximum round	Maximum votes	Share in maximum round	Maximum votes First round votes Transfer votes
Democratic	Mercedes Narcisse	7	8,940	63.7%	
Democratic	Shirley Paul	7	5,094	36.3%	
Democratic	Gardy Brazela	6	3,668	23.4%	
Democratic	Donald Cranston	5	2,791	16.3%	
Democratic	Judy Newton	4	1,905	10.8%	
Democratic	R. Dimple Willabus	3	1,445	8.0%	
Democratic	Tiffany Pryor	2	550	3.0%	
Democratic	Zuri Jackson	2	428	2.3%	
Write-in		1	58	0.3%	

=== General election ===
2021 New York City Council District 46 general election
Party	Candidate	Votes	%	±%
Democratic	Mercedes Narcisse	15,914	62.8	
Republican	Donald Cranston	9,408	37.2	
Write-in				
Total votes			100	

== District 47 ==
In the 47th district, incumbent Democrat Mark Treyger was term-limited and could not run for a third consecutive term.

=== Democratic primary ===

Kagan

20–30%
30–40%
40–50%
50–60%
60–70%
70–80%

Patzer

30–40%
40–50%
50–60%
60–70%

Packer

30–40%
40–50%

Other

30–40% tie
40–50% tie
50% tie
No votes

Kagan

20–30%
30–40%
40–50%
50–60%
60–70%
70–80%

Patzer

30–40%
40–50%
50–60%
60–70%

Packer

30–40%
40–50%

Other

30–40% tie
40–50% tie
50% tie
No votes

Kagan

50–60%
60–70%
70–80%
80–90%

Patzer

50–60%
60–70%
70–80%

Other

50% tie
No votes

==== Candidates ====
- Alec Brook-Krasny, former state assemblymember
- Ari Kagan, Democratic district leader in the 45th assembly district
- Joseph Packer, assistant manager
- Steven Patzer, construction worker

Withdrawn

- Winton Tran

==== Endorsements ====
Alec Brook-Krasny

Organizations

- Police Benevolent Association of the City of New York
Ari Kagan

State legislators

- John Liu, New York state senator for the 11th district
- Diane Savino, New York state senator for the 23rd district

Local officials

- Justin Brannan, New York City Councilmember from the 43rd district
- Alan Maisel, New York City Councilmember from the 46th district
- Mark Treyger, New York City Councilmember from the 47th district

Labor unions

- District Council 37
- SEIU 32BJ
- United Federation of Teachers

Newspapers and publications

- The Jewish Press
Steven Patzer

State officials

- Mathylde Frontus, New York State Assemblymember for the 46th district
- Kevin Parker, state senator

Individuals

- Steve Schirripa, actor

Organizations

- Run for Something

==== Results ====
2021 New York City Council District 47 Democratic primary results
Party	Candidate	Maximum round	Maximum votes	Share in maximum round	Maximum votes First round votes Transfer votes
Democratic	Ari Kagan	3	4,018	55.7%	
Democratic	Steven Patzer	3	3,194	44.3%	
Democratic	Joseph Packer	2	1,071	13.4%	
Democratic	Alec Brook-Krasny	2	759	9.5%	
Write-in		1	39	0.5%	

=== General election ===
2021 New York City Council District 47 general election
Party	Candidate	Votes	%	±%
Democratic	Ari Kagan	7,933	53.1	
Republican	Mark Szuszkiewicz	6,443	43.1	
Conservative	Mark Szuszkiewicz	532	3.6	
Total	Mark Szuszkiewicz	6,975	46.7	
Write-in		25	0.2	
Total votes		14,933	100	

== District 48 ==
The 48th district was vacant. The incumbent was Democrat Chaim Deutsch, who was term-limited and could not run for a third consecutive term. In April 2021 he pleaded guilty to tax fraud, but through his lawyer announced his intentions to finish his term. On April 27, following a plea agreement, Deutsch was deemed to have "violated his oath of office" and was removed from the council. Inna Vernikov a former Democrat and former aide to New York State Assemblymember, Dov Hikind defeated Steve Saperstein after receiving nearly 64% of the vote. Her victory made her the first Republican to represent Brooklyn in the New York City Council since Marty Golden in 2002. Due to the vacancy, she was sworn in on December 1, 2021.

=== Democratic primary ===

Saperstein

20–30%
30–40%
40–50%
50–60%
60–70%
70–80%
90–100%

Markh

20–30%
30–40%
40–50%
50–60%

Adler

30–40%

Bendet

20–30%
30–40%
40–50%
50–60%

Other

20–30% tie
30–40% tie
No votes

Saperstein

20–30%
30–40%
40–50%
50–60%
60–70%
70–80%
90–100%

Markh

20–30%
30–40%
40–50%
50–60%

Adler

30–40%

Bendet

20–30%
30–40%
40–50%
50–60%

Other

30–40% tie
No votes

Saperstein

20–30%
30–40%
40–50%
50–60%
60–70%
70–80%
90–100%

Markh

20–30%
30–40%
40–50%
50–60%

Adler

30–40%
40–50%

Bendet

20–30%
30–40%
40–50%
50–60%
60–70%

Other

30–40% tie
50% tie
No votes

Saperstein

30–40%
40–50%
50–60%
60–70%
70–80%
90–100%

Markh

30–40%
40–50%
50–60%

Adler

30–40%
40–50%

Other

30–40% tie
40–50% tie
50% tie
No votes

Saperstein

50–60%
60–70%
70–80%
80–90%
90–100%

Markh

50–60%
60–70%

Other

50% tie
No votes

2021 New York City Council District 48 Democratic primary results
Party	Candidate	Maximum round	Maximum votes	Share in maximum round	Maximum votes First round votes Transfer votes
Democratic	Steven Saperstein	5	4,542	57.1%	
Democratic	Mariya Markh	5	3,416	42.9%	
Democratic	Amber L. Adler	4	2,004	23.2%	
Democratic	Binyomin Bendet	3	1,589	17.6%	
Democratic	Heshy Tischler	2	463	5.0%	
Write-in		1	68	0.7%	

Withdrawn

- Adam Dweck
- Boris Noble

=== Republican primary ===
- Inna Vernikov

=== General election ===
2021 New York City Council District 48 general election
Party	Candidate	Votes	%	±%
Republican	Inna Vernikov	12,963	61.3%	
Democratic	Steven Saperstein	8,038	38.2%	
Write-in		38	0.01%	
Total votes		21,039	100	
Republican gain from Democratic				

=== Endorsements ===
Inna Vernikov

Local officials

- Joe Borelli, NYC council member (51st District)
- Chaim Deutsch, former NYC council member (48th District) (Democrat)

State officials

- Dov Hikind, former New York state assemblyman (1983–2018) (Democrat)
- David Storobin, former New York state senator (2012)

Federal officials

- Nicole Malliotakis, U.S. representative for New York's 11th congressional district (2021–present)
- Lee Zeldin, U.S. representative for New York's 1st congressional district (2015–present)

Individuals

- Donald Trump Jr.

Rabbinical support

- Rabbi Dovid Goldwasser

Organizations

- New York State Republican Committee
- New York Young Republican Club
Amber Adler

Organizations

- Run for Something
Binyomin Bendet

Newspapers and publications

- The Jewish Press
Mariya Markh

State officials

- Steven Cymbrowitz, state assemblymember
- Helene Weinstein, state assemblymember

Local officials

- Alan Maisel, NYC councilmember

Organizations

- New York League of Conservation Voters
Steven Saperstein

Labor unions

- United Federation of Teachers

Organizations

- Police Benevolent Association of the City of New York
