= New York's 56th State Assembly district =

American legislative district

Assemblymember
Stefani Zinerman; D–Bedford-Stuyvesant

New York's 56th State Assembly district is one of the 150 districts in the New York State Assembly. It has been represented by Stefani Zinerman since 2021.

== Geography ==
District 56 is in Brooklyn, encompassing Bedford-Stuyvesant and portions of Crown Heights.

The district overlaps (partially) with New York's 8th and 9th congressional districts, the 20th and 25th districts of the New York State Senate, and the 36th and 41st districts of the New York City Council.

== Recent election results ==
=== 2026 ===
2026 New York State Assembly election, District 56
Primary election
Party	Candidate	Votes	%
Democratic	Eon Huntley	9,004	58.4
Democratic	Stefani Zinerman (incumbent)	5,627	36.5
Democratic	Michael Bailey	764	5.0
Write-in		23	0.1
Total votes		15,418	100.0
General election
Democratic	Eon Huntley		
Working Families	Eon Huntley		
Total	Eon Huntley		
Write-in			
Total votes			100.0

=== 2024 ===
2024 New York State Assembly election, District 56
Primary election
Party	Candidate	Votes	%
Democratic	Stefani Zinerman (incumbent)	4,642	52.8
Democratic	Eon Huntley	4,126	46.9
Write-in		32	0.3
Total votes		8,800	100
General election
Democratic	Stefani Zinerman (incumbent)	37,956	99.0
Write-in		371	1.0
Total votes		38,327	100.0
Democratic hold			

=== 2022 ===
2022 New York State Assembly election, District 56
Party	Candidate	Votes	%
Democratic	Stefani Zinerman (incumbent)	25,154	99.5
Write-in		135	0.5
Total votes		25,289	100.0
Democratic hold			

=== 2020 ===
2020 New York State Assembly election, District 56
Primary election
Party	Candidate	Votes	%
Democratic	Stefani Zinerman	10,267	56.7
Democratic	Justin Cohen	7,720	42.7
Write-in		106	0.6
Total votes		18,093	100
General election
Democratic	Stefani Zinerman	45,103	99.7
Write-in		141	0.3
Total votes		45,244	100
Democratic hold			

=== 2018 ===
2018 New York State Assembly election, District 56
Party	Candidate	Votes	%
Democratic	Tremaine Wright	33,678	
Working Families	Tremaine Wright	2,841	
Total	Tremaine Wright (incumbent)	36,519	99.8
Write-in		78	0.2
Total votes		36,597	100
Democratic hold			

=== 2016 ===
2016 New York State Assembly election, District 56
Primary election
Party	Candidate	Votes	%
Democratic	Tremaine Wright	3,876	58.8
Democratic	Karen Cherry	2,698	40.9
Write-in		19	0.3
Total votes		6,593	100
General election
Democratic	Tremaine Wright	39,040	
Working Families	Tremaine Wright	2,796	
Total	Tremaine Wright	41,836	99.8
Write-in		80	0.2
Total votes		41,916	100
Democratic hold			

=== 2014 ===
2014 New York State Assembly election, District 56
Party	Candidate	Votes	%
Democratic	Annette Robinson (incumbent)	14,648	97.9
Republican	Garnsey Lee Alston	306	2.0
Write-in		12	0.1
Total votes		14,966	100
Democratic hold			

=== 2012 ===
2012 New York State Assembly election, District 56
Party	Candidate	Votes	%
Democratic	Annette Robinson (incumbent)	36,891	98.6
Republican	Francenia Sims-Hall	510	1.3
Write-in		18	0.1
Total votes		37,419	100
Democratic hold			

=== 2010 ===
2010 New York State Assembly election, District 56
Party	Candidate	Votes	%
Democratic	Annette Robinson (incumbent)	17,705	97.6
Republican	Garnsey Lee Alston	425	2.3
Write-in		7	0.1
Total votes		18,137	100
Democratic hold			

=== 2008 ===
2008 New York State Assembly election, District 56
Primary election
Party	Candidate	Votes	%
Democratic	Annette Robinson (incumbent)	4,046	74.7
Democratic	Cenceria Edwards	1,372	25.3
Write-in		0	0.0
Total votes		5,418	100.0
General election
Democratic	Annette Robinson (incumbent)	30,911	98.5
Republican	Henry Snead Sr.	477	1.5
Write-in		1	0.0
Total votes		31,389	100.0
Democratic hold			

=== 2006 ===
2006 New York State Assembly election, District 56
Primary election
Party	Candidate	Votes	%
Democratic	Annette Robinson (incumbent)	5,182	82.2
Democratic	Richard Taylor	1,124	17.8
Write-in		0	0.0
Total votes		6,306	100.0
General election
Democratic	Annette Robinson (incumbent)	12,785	100.0
Write-in		5	0.0
Total votes		12,790	100.0
Democratic hold			

=== 2004 ===
2004 New York State Assembly election, District 56
Primary election
Party	Candidate	Votes	%
Democratic	Annette Robinson (incumbent)	3,650	82.8
Democratic	Richard Taylor	758	17.2
Write-in		1	0.0
Total votes		4,409	100.0
General election
Democratic	Annette Robinson	26,205	
Working Families	Annette Robinson	941	
Total	Annette Robinson (incumbent)	27,146	97.5
Republican	Mayra Radden	704	2.5
Write-in		0	0.0
Total votes		27,850	100.0
Democratic hold			

=== 2002 ===
2002 New York State Assembly election, District 56
Primary election
Party	Candidate	Votes	%
Democratic	Annette Robinson (incumbent)	5,158	77.9
Democratic	Stanley Kinard	1,460	22.1
Write-in		1	0.0
Total votes		6,619	100.0
General election
Democratic	Annette Robinson	13,897	
Working Families	Annette Robinson	745	
Total	Annette Robinson (incumbent)	14,642	97.3
Independence	Stanley Kinard	402	2.7
Write-in		2	0.0
Total votes		15,046	100.0
Democratic win (new boundaries)			

=== 2002 special ===
Incumbent Albert Vann resigned his seat on December 31, 2001 to serve in the New York City Council, triggering a special election. In special elections for state legislative offices, primaries are usually not held – county committee members and district leaders for each party select nominees. Election was held on February 12th, 2002.

2002 New York State Assembly special election, District 56
Party	Candidate	Votes	%
Democratic	Annette Robinson	1,975	
Independence	Annette Robinson	202	
Total	Annette Robinson	2,177	85.5
Republican	Arthur Bramwell	195	
Conservative	Arthur Bramwell	51	
Total	Arthur Bramwell	246	9.7
Liberal	Richard Taylor	111	4.4
Libertarian	Sam Sloan	11	0.4
Write-in		0	0.0
Total votes		2,545	100.0
Democratic hold			

=== 2000 ===
2000 New York State Assembly election, District 56
Party	Candidate	Votes	%
Democratic	Albert Vann (incumbent)	23,415	96.1
Republican	Aaron Bramwell	487	2.0
Liberal	Richard Taylor	306	1.3
Independence	Luvenia Suber	163	0.7
Write-in		0	0.0
Total votes		24,371	100.0
Democratic hold			

=== Federal results in Assembly District 56 ===
Year	Office	Results
2024	President	Harris 88.5 - 8.3%
2024	Senate	Gillibrand 91.8 - 6.7%
2022	Senate	Schumer 94.9 - 4.3%
2020	President	Biden 94.4 - 4.4%
2018	Senate	Gillibrand 98.1 - 1.7%
2016	President	Clinton 94.1 - 2.1%
2016	Senate	Schumer 93.8 - 3.8%
2012	President	Obama 98.3 - 1.0%
2012	Senate	Gillibrand 98.1 - 1.0%
