= David Yassky =

American lawyer and politician

David S. Yassky

Member of the New York City Council from the 33rd District
- In office January 1, 2002 – December 31, 2009
- Preceded by: Ken Fisher
- Succeeded by: Stephen Levin

Personal details
- Spouse: Diana Fortuna
- Children: 2
- Education: The Dalton School; Princeton University; Yale Law School
- Profession: Lawyer

David S. Yassky is an American lawyer and politician. He was a member of the New York City Council from 2002 until 2009, the chairperson of the New York City Taxi and Limousine Commission, and the Dean of Pace University School of Law from April 2014 to April 2018.

In 2006, Yassky ran for U.S. Congress in Brooklyn, losing to Yvette Clarke, and in 2009 he ran a losing campaign for the Democratic nomination for New York City Comptroller. In 2022, he ran in the primary for the New York State Senate.

== Education ==
The son of a prominent lawyer and an entertainment executive, Yassky attended the Dalton School on Manhattan's Upper East Side, Princeton University and Yale Law School.

== Career ==
He was a budget analyst for the New York City Mayor's Office of Management and Budget. He then served as chief counsel to the House Subcommittee on Crime, a subcommittee chaired by Charles Schumer. Yassky was a member of the faculty of the Brooklyn Law School.

=== City Council ===
Yassky was elected to the New York City Council in 2001, representing the 33rd district, which includes parts of downtown Brooklyn, including Brooklyn Heights, Greenpoint, Williamsburg, DUMBO, Boerum Hill and Park Slope. He was chair of the Council's Small Business Committee.

Yassky was one of 29 council members who voted in 2008 to extend term limits for themselves effectively ignoring two previous public votes imposing a limit of two terms. Hours before the final vote on term limits, Yassky proposed an amendment from the floor that would have altered the legislation to require approval by popular vote before term limits could change. The amendment failed by a vote of 28-22, but Yassky voted for the extension anyway.

=== 2006 Congressional campaign ===
In 2006, Yassky ran for the Democratic Party's nomination for the 11th Congressional District seat, an open seat held by the retiring Congressman Major Owens. He was part of a four-way race which also included New York State Senator Carl Andrews, New York City Council member Yvette D. Clarke and Major Owens's son Chris Owens.

During the primary, Major Owens called Yassky a "colonizer," and Al Sharpton called Yassky "greedy." City Council member Albert Vann sent an email to Black elected officials stating that "we are in peril of losing a 'Voting Rights' district ... as a result of the well financed candidacy of Council Member David Yassky, a white individual." The area had been represented by politicians of African or Caribbean descent since the election of Shirley Chisholm in 1968.

In August 2006, The New York Times endorsed Yassky, citing his "stellar record on the Council" and criticizing his rivals for not making a substantial case for their election, and the Democratic leadership within Brooklyn for failing to find qualified Black candidates for this seat.

In a primary election held on September 12, 2006, Yassky garnered 26% of the popular vote. The winner was Yvette Clarke, with about 30%.

=== 2009 Comptroller election ===
In 2009, Yassky ran for the office of New York City Comptroller. He was endorsed by Ed Koch and his former boss, Sen. Charles Schumer. The New York Times on August 23, 2009, attributed its endorsement to his "skill, intelligence, and independence." In the Democratic primary held on September 15, 2009, Yassky was the runner-up with 107,474 votes, or approximately 30% of the votes cast. He lost in the run-off with 44.4% of the vote to John Liu, who had more support among union members and minority groups.

=== NYC Taxi and Limousine Commission ===
Yassky was named chairman of the Taxi and Limousine Commission in 2010. During his tenure he promoted the Taxi of Tomorrow program, which required the variety of the automobiles making up the 13,000 NYC yellow cabs to be replaced by the Nissan NV200. By 2018, only 2,671 of the 12,000 medallion holder were driving the NV200 and the requirement was reversed, stating that the reversal was intended to give drivers more choices. The New York Times noted that "the decision [came] at a time when the yellow taxi industry is in financial free-fall, decimated by the extraordinary rise of ride-hailing apps like Uber and Lyft." Yassky quit the TLC in 2013 after incoming mayor Bill de Blasio announced his intention to replace him.

=== Pace University School of Law ===
Yassky became dean of Pace University School of Law in April 2014. Yassky stepped down as dean in 2018. Yassky briefly campaigned for a State Senate seat, and when the Pace faculty and students learned of this, he told the Pace faculty that he knew he would not be selected for the seat.

== Personal life ==
Yassky has been married to Metropolitan Opera CFO Diana Fortuna since 1990, and they live in Brooklyn Heights with their two daughters.

Political offices
Preceded by Ken Fisher	New York City Council, 33rd district 2002–2009	Succeeded by Stephen T. Levin

Preceded by Matthew W. Daus	New York City; Taxi and Limousine Commission; Commissioner; 2010–2012	Succeeded by Meera Joshi
