= Stefani Zinerman =

New York State politician

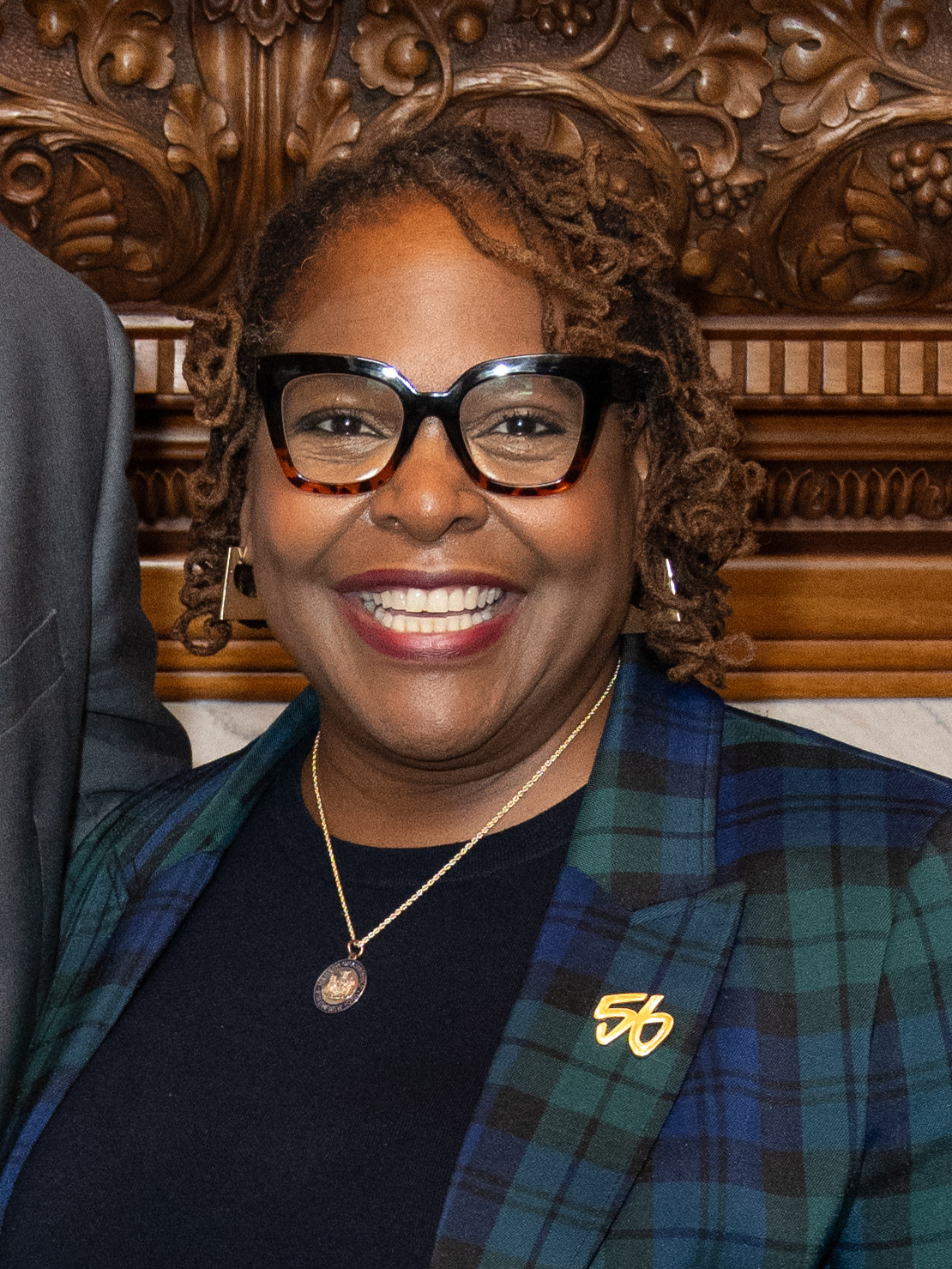

Member of the New York State Assembly from the 56th district
- Incumbent
- Assumed office January 6, 2021
- Preceded by: Tremaine Wright

Personal details
- Born: October 30, 1964 (age 62)
- Party: Democratic
- Education: Rochester Institute of Technology (BA)
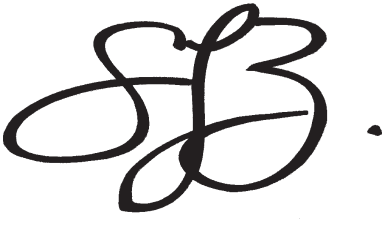
- Signature
- Website: State Assembly website

Stefani Zinerman is an American politician. A member of the Democratic Party, she currently represents district 56, which includes Bedford-Stuyvesant and Crown Heights in Brooklyn, New York, in the New York State Assembly.

== Early life and education ==
Zinerman grew up in Downtown Brooklyn in Gowanus public housing. Her parents were from Bedford-Stuyvesant, and lived in Clinton Hill, Brooklyn until they were able to move to Gowanus through the New York City Housing Authority. She credits her parents for encouraging her interest in politics.

Zinerman studied business management at the Rochester Institute of Technology. She worked in the banking industry and beverage distribution and later, was senior manager for a New York City adult literacy program.

Zinerman also served as a pastor and was involved in community organizations including the Brooklyn NAACP and Age-Friendly, a program she chaired that helps local leaders improve their communities for the elderly.

== Political career ==
=== Work for other politicians ===
Zinerman entered local politics after New York City Mayor Michael Bloomberg defunded the Begin Education/Employment Gain Independence Now (BEGIN) program; she volunteered with the Obama For America campaign, becoming the Bedford-Stuyvesant neighborhood volunteer leader.

Zinerman served as Robert E. Cornegy's petition and campaign manager starting in 2012 and became his chief of staff once he was elected. As a staffer, she focused on serving the African American community of Bedford-Stuyvesant and Crown Heights, being a member of the Black, Latino and Asian Caucus with Cornegy, which worked on issues such as juvenile criminal justice reform and classifying the murder of Timothy Caughman as a hate crime.

=== Election to Assembly ===
When Tremaine Wright announced she would not be seeking reelection in the 56th Assembly District in order to instead run for State Senate, Zinerman announced her candidacy at the Weeksville Heritage Center, with the support of Wright. After winning the Democratic primary, she ran unopposed in November 2020 to take the seat.

Zinerman is a member of the Black, Puerto Rican, Hispanic & Asian Legislative Caucus.

Zinerman ran for the Assembly on a platform focusing on local concerns and constituent engagement, particularly community health and education equity. She advocates for several community-based health initiatives, including for healthy aging, community-supported agriculture, access to healthy food, doula care, more school-based health centers, and safe staffing standards for nurses. From the Campaign for Fiscal Equity, she wants state aid for basic school funding. She advocates for lessened police contact and a community policing model with investment in education and social service programs, citing the murder of George Floyd and the shooting of Breonna Taylor.

=== 2024 primary ===
In 2024, Zinerman faced a primary challenge from Democratic Socialists of America candidate, Eon Huntley. The race was called "one of the most closely contested state races this primary cycle" and "an existential fight for the political soul of Bed-Stuy Brooklyn".

A key issue in the race was housing, with Zinerman supporters saying that Huntley represented young white gentrifiers and highlighting his address outside of the district. Huntley said that Zinerman represented "the real estate, charter school and Israel lobbies" and that he would fight for voters to "stay in their homes". Additionally, Zinerman opposed "good-cause eviction" legislation, while Huntley supported it.

Zinerman was endorsed by Hakeem Jeffries and Tish James. New York Focus reported that Zinerman received support from Solidarity PAC, a pro-Israel lobby group that "resembles" AIPAC. Super PACs funded by Michael Bloomberg and real estate developers spent about half a million dollars in support of her campaign.

On May 17, the Huntley campaign filed a complaint with the New York State Board of Elections against Zinerman alleging campaign finance violations.

Zinerman won the primary race, receiving 4,642 (52.8%) votes to Huntley's 4,126 (46.9%).

=== 2026 primary ===
Zinerman faced a primary rematch from Huntley in 2026. She lost the Democratic nomination to Huntley in the June 23rd primary, receiving 5,627 (36.5%) votes to Huntley's 9,004 (58.4%).
