= Chi Ossé =

American politician (born 1998)

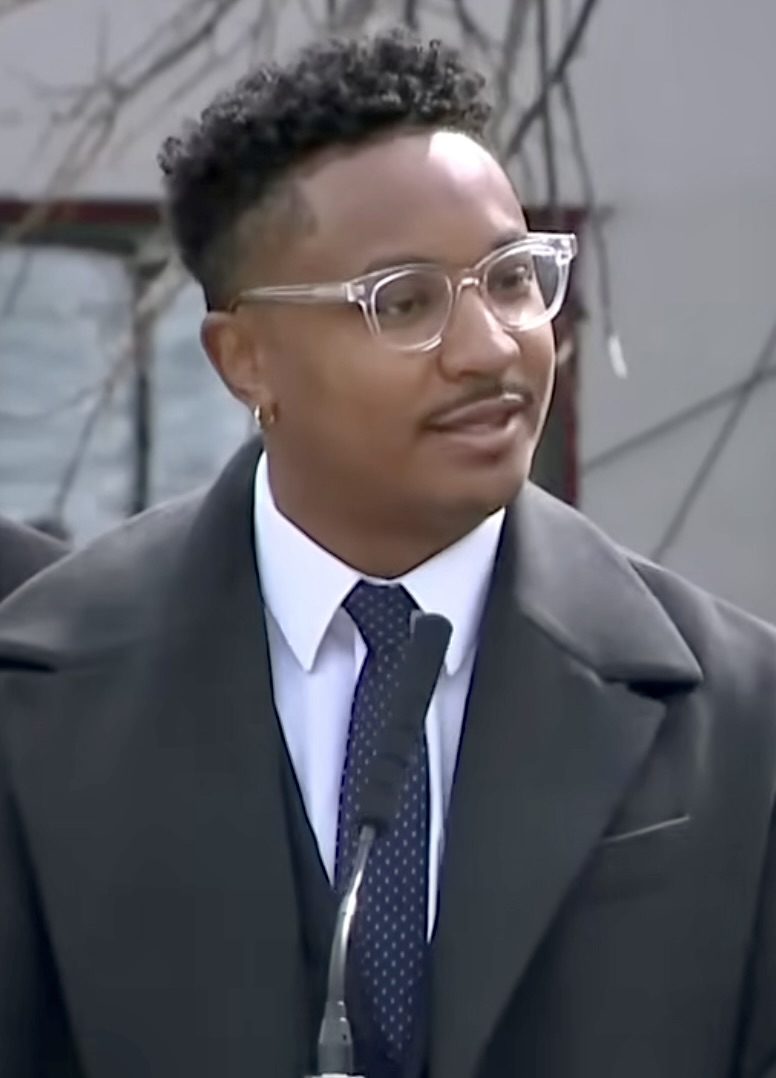
- Ossé in 2026

Member of the New York City Council from the 36th district
- Incumbent
- Assumed office January 1, 2022
- Preceded by: Robert Cornegy
- Parliamentary group: New York City Socialists in Office

Personal details
- Born: Chi Ajani Ossé; March 18, 1998 (age 28) New York City, New York, U.S.
- Party: Democratic
- Other political affiliations: Democratic Socialists of America (2020; 2025–present)
- Parent: Combat Jack (father)
- Education: Chapman University (attended)
- Website: Official website Campaign website at the Wayback Machine (archived 2022-02-11) (archive)

Chi Ajani Ossé (/tʃi oʊˈseɪ/ CHEE oh-SAY, born March 18, 1998) is an American politician and activist from New York City who serves as a member of the New York City Council for the 36th district, based largely in the Brooklyn neighborhood of Bedford–Stuyvesant, and some of northern Crown Heights.

== Early life and education ==
Ossé was born and raised to a Haitian-American family in Brooklyn, where his family has lived for three generations. His father, hip hop attorney and journalist Reggie Ossé, known professionally as Combat Jack, died from cancer in 2017, when Ossé was 19. His mother, Akim Vann, is the daughter of Grammy award-winning record producer and songwriter Teddy Vann, whose parents immigrated to New York from Hong Kong and the Caribbean. He was raised Nichiren Buddhist.

Ossé attended P.S. 321 in Park Slope for elementary school. He graduated from Friends Seminary in 2016 and attended Chapman University in Orange, California, but dropped out following his father's death in 2017.

== Career ==
Ossé worked for several years in the entertainment industry as a promoter. In May 2020, amid nationwide protests over the murder of George Floyd, Ossé became a prominent Black Lives Matter organizer and co-founded the activist collective "Warriors in the Garden". According to public statements, Ossé joined the Democratic Socialists of America in 2020 but left shortly after as he felt his views and those of the organization's did not align. Ossé rejoined the New York City chapter in the summer of 2025, following Zohran Mamdani's victory in the 2025 New York City Democratic mayoral primary.

Ossé rejected an offer to serve as a delegate for Joe Biden at the 2024 Democratic National Convention, but ultimately elected to attend the event following the withdrawal of Biden, being granted a credential as one of approximately 200 influencers at the DNC.

=== 2021 City Council campaign ===
On Juneteenth 2020, Ossé announced his 2021 campaign to succeed term-limited Councilman Robert Cornegy in the 36th district of the New York City Council. Ossé, who acknowledged that he knew little about city government before the protests of spring 2020, cited police brutality and the Black Lives Matter movement as the impetus for his campaign, and charged that the City Council and Mayor Bill de Blasio had not done enough to reshape policing in the city.

With endorsements from the Working Families Party and Congresswoman Alexandria Ocasio-Cortez's Courage to Change PAC, Ossé was seen as the furthest-left candidate in a field that also included district leader Henry Butler, local political operative Tahirah Moore, and pastor Robert Waterman. His campaign also found an unusual niche due to Ossé's youth and personal style, with many non-political publications interviewing Ossé and running profiles of his campaign.

On election night (June 22, 2021), Ossé led the field with 37 percent of the vote; when absentee ballots and ranked-choice votes were counted, he defeated Butler 57-43%. His victory, and the size of his margin, was seen as a considerable upset, given his opponents' more traditional political backgrounds and endorsements. Ossé ran unopposed in the November general election, becoming the council's youngest ever member.

=== 2025 election ===
Ossé retained his City Council seat in the 2025 election.

=== Tenure ===
Ossé filed to run in New York's 8th congressional district against Hakeem Jeffries in November 2025, but did not win the endorsement of the New York City Democratic Socialists of America. After polling showed that Jeffries held a 50 point lead over Ossé, whose run was labelled opportunistic and pathetic, he dropped out.

In April 2026, while protesting the eviction of one of his constituents, Ossé was arrested by the NYPD. The incident helped spur Mayor Zohran Mamdani to launch a mayoral office dedicated to preventing deed theft, a type of fraud particularly rife in historically Black areas of New York City, such as Ossé's district.

Since 2022, Ossé has been the main sponsor of a bill, the CURB (Communities United to Reject Brutality) Act, that would prevent the NYPD from using its Strategic Response Group to break up nonviolent protests, kettle or tear-gas peaceful protesters, or use similar tactics. The CURB Act is supported by the New York Civil Liberties Union and the Council's Progressive Caucus.

In September 2026, Ossé was arrested alongside over 100 protestors at a protest ahead of a speech by Israeli prime minister Benjamin Netanyahu at the United Nations General Assembly.

== Personal life ==
Ossé's father was Reginald Ossé, a Haitian-American hip hop music attorney, executive, journalist, editor and podcaster. His mother, Akim Vann, owns and operates The Bakery on Bergen, a small business in Prospect Heights, Brooklyn. His grandfather was Teddy Vann, a music producer who grew up in Brooklyn’s Bensonhurst neighborhood and won a Grammy working with his longtime protege Luther Vandross.

Ossé is openly queer. He lives in Crown Heights, and is a practicing Nichiren Buddhist. He is also a competitive powerlifter.

== Electoral history ==
=== 2025 ===
2025 New York City Council Democratic primary, District 36
Party	Candidate	Votes	%
Democratic	Chi Ossé (incumbent)	23,815	78.3
Democratic	Reginald Swiney	6,378	21.0
Write-in		236	0.8
Total votes		30,429	100.0

2025 New York City Council election, District 36
Party	Candidate	Votes	%
Democratic	Chi Ossé (incumbent)	44,256	99.4
Write-in		268	0.6
Total votes		44,524	100.0
Democratic hold			

=== 2023 ===
2023 New York City Council election, District 36
Party	Candidate	Votes	%
Democratic	Chi Ossé	7,132	72.3
Working Families	Chi Ossé	2,603	26.4
Total	Chi Ossé (incumbent)	9,735	98.8
Write-in		123	1.2
Total votes		9,858	100.0
Democratic hold			

=== 2021 ===
2021 New York City Council Democratic primary, District 36
Party	Candidate	Maximum round	Maximum votes	Share in maximum round	Maximum votes First round votes Transfer votes
Democratic	Chi Ossé	4	11,149	57.0%	
Democratic	Henry L. Butler	4	8,402	43.0%	
Democratic	Tahirah A. Moore	3	6,196	28.6%	
Democratic	Robert Waterman	2	3,281	14.1%	
Democratic	Reginald Swiney	2	628	2.7%	
Write-In		1	86	0.4%	

2021 New York City Council election, District 36
Party	Candidate	Votes	%
Democratic	Chi Ossé	18,999	99.3
Write-in		126	0.7
Total votes		19,125	100.0
Democratic hold			

== See also ==
- Chinese people in New York City
- LGBT culture in New York City
- List of LGBT people from New York City
- NYC Pride March
