= Robert Cornegy =

American politician (born 1965)

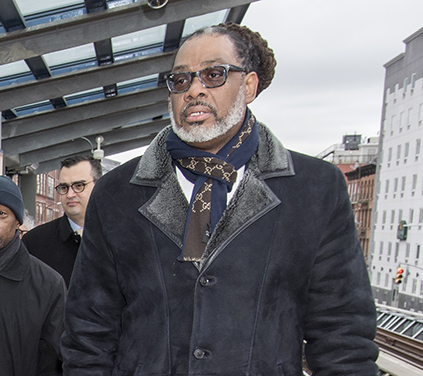
- Cornegy in 2020

Member of the New York City Council from the 36th District
- In office January 1, 2014 – January 1, 2022
- Preceded by: Albert Vann
- Succeeded by: Chi Ossé

Chairman of the New York City Council Democratic Conference
- In office January 11, 2018 – December 31, 2021
- Speaker: Corey Johnson
- Preceded by: Position established

Personal details
- Born: September 24, 1965 (age 61) Brooklyn, New York, U.S.
- Party: Democratic
- Spouse: Michelle Cornegy
- Children: 6
- Education: St. John's University; University of Alabama; Mercy College
- Website: Official website

Robert E. Cornegy Jr. (born September 24, 1965) is an American politician. He is a former New York City Council Member for the 36th district, representing Bedford-Stuyvesant and northern Crown Heights in Brooklyn.

A Democrat, he was an unsuccessful candidate for Brooklyn Borough President in 2021.

== Early life, education and early career ==
Cornegy is a native of New York City. He is the son of the late Dr. Robert E. Cornegy Sr., pastor of Mount Calvary Baptist Church in Bedford-Stuyvesant, and Ellen J. Cornegy, the First Lady of Mount Calvary Baptist Church.

He played center for Andrew Jackson High School and was recruited by both Temple University and Syracuse University before playing backup center for St. John's University's 1984-85 Final Four team. Cornegy would later graduate from Mercy College in Dobbs Ferry, New York, with a bachelor's degree in Organizational Management. He played professional basketball in both Israel and Turkey.

Following his basketball career, he earned a master's degree in Organizational Management from Mercy College. He returned to Bedford-Stuyvesant and with an increased awareness of the mental health issues and drug use in the community became a Credentialed Alcoholism and Substance Abuse Counselor (CASAC). He later opened the Cornegy Residence treatment center for chemically dependent men in Bedford-Stuyvesant.

== New York City Council ==
In 2009, Cornegy made his first run at the 36th district, but lost the primary election to incumbent Albert Vann. Four years later, he was elected to the same district after defeating Kirsten John Foy for the Democratic nomination in a close race. He won the general election easily on November 5, 2013.

In 2017, Cornegy was reelected to his Council seat. He is Chair of the Council's Committee on Housing and Buildings, Chair of the Minority- and Women-Owned Business Enterprise Task Force (M/WBEs), and a member of the Budget Negotiating Team (BNT). He is also a member of the Committees on Economic Development; Education; Finance; State & Federal Legislation; and Rules, Privileges, and Elections.

In 2017, Cornegy also ran to become the first black Speaker of the New York City Council and was named Democratic Conference Chair of the New York City Council in 2018.

=== Legislation ===
In his first term, Cornegy was among the top 10 percent of sponsored legislation. Bills and initiatives of which he has led, sponsored or authored include:

- A lactation bill, mandating there be dedicated rooms for nursing and breast-feeding mothers in public buildings throughout the five boroughs
- The Kalief Browder Bill, calling for the Department of Corrections to provide vocational and educational programming, therapy and services to those detained or incarcerated on Rikers Island for longer than 10 days
- Commercial tenant anti-harassment and neglect legislation, offering protection against criminal landlords by creating a private right of action for commercial tenants facing harassment, and allocating $3.6 million to cover the legal costs associated with fighting unscrupulous property owners
- Senior Citizen Rent Increase Exemption (SCRIE) and the Disabled Rent Increase Exemption (DRIE), which is part of the Rent Freeze Program, an effort to increase affordable housing in NYC
- Workforce Disclosure Bill that requires certain contractors working on city-funded projects to disclose records on the nature of their workforce, including the certification of the contractor as a minority-owned or women-owned business enterprise

Cornegy also sponsored the bill to co-name the block of Stuyvesant Avenue between Lexington Avenue and Quincy Street, "Do the Right Thing Way" after the iconic 1989 movie Spike Lee directed and shot on that block. It was the first time a New York City street was named for a work of art, rather than a person or institution. Lee contributed to Cornegy's run for Brooklyn Borough President.

== Other activities ==
In 2012, Cornegy served as a delegate to President Obama at the Democratic National Convention. That same year, he also became District Leader / State Committeeman for the 56th Assembly District and was part of the Taskforce to Combat Gun Violence, delivering recommendations to reduce gun violence in NYC to the NYC Council Speaker.

In 2013, he partnered with Attorney General Eric Schneiderman to invest $20 million in funding the Homeowner Protection Program (HOPP) and launch the Foreclosure Rescue Scam Protection Initiative.

In 2014, Cornegy developed the Chamber on the Go program in partnership with the Brooklyn Chamber of Commerce to provide mobile support services to small businesses.

Cornegy supported the establishment of The Age Friendly Neighborhood (AFN) Initiative to improve the quality of life of older adults through advocacy, programming and access to essential resources.

While Chair of the Committee on Small Business, Cornegy co-led research on the state of the retail economy in NYC and delivered strategies to address retail challenges faced in underserved neighborhoods.

Cornegy was selected as a 2017-18 MIT CoLab Mel King Community Fellow alongside other social justice leaders.

== Election history ==
Election history
Location	Year	Election	Results
NYC Council District 36	2009	Democratic primary	√ Albert Vann 29.90% Mark Winston Griffith 22.84% Saquan Jones 9.87% Tremaine Wright 8.98% David Grinage 8.90% Adrian Straker 7.45% Robert Cornegy 7.08%
NYC Council District 36	2013	Democratic primary	√ Robert Cornegy 30.33% Kirsten John Foy 29.86% Robert Waterman 21.86% Conrad B. Tillard 13.27% Reginald Swiney 4.68%
NYC Council District 36	2013	General	√ Robert Cornegy (D) 87.27% Kirsten John Foy (WFP) 10.17% Veronica Thompson (R) 2.51%
NYC Council District 36	2017	General	√ Robert Cornegy (D) 99.08%

== Personal life ==
Cornegy and his wife, Michelle, have a blended family of six children and live in Bedford Stuyvesant. A member of Omega Psi Phi, he has been noted for his seven-foot frame and long locs that are wrapped into a bun.

At 6 ft 10 in (2.08m), Cornegy was the tallest member of the New York City Council. From March 2019 to October 2019, Cornegy was the Guinness World Records holder for the World's Tallest Politician, but this title has since been conferred upon North Dakota Insurance Commissioner Jon Godfread, who is just over one centimeter taller.

Political offices
Preceded by Albert Vann	New York City Council, 36th district 2014–2022	Succeeded by Chi Ossé
