= Tremaine Wright =

American politician

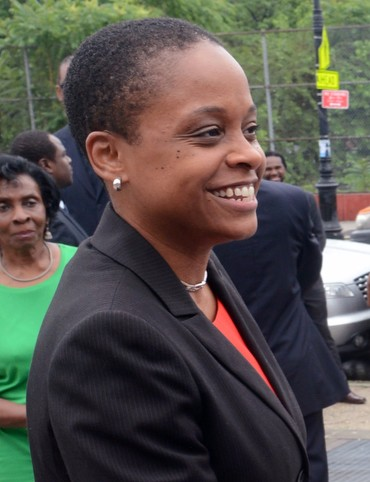
- Utica Av. Elevators

Chair of the New York State Cannabis Control Board
- Incumbent
- Assumed office September 6, 2021
- Governor: Kathy Hochul
- Preceded by: position established

Member of the New York State Assembly from the 56th district
- In office January 1, 2017 – January 1, 2021
- Preceded by: Annette Robinson
- Succeeded by: Stefani Zinerman

Personal details
- Born: November 2, 1972 (age 53)
- Party: Democratic
- Education: Duke University; University of Chicago
- Website: Official website Campaign website

Tremaine Wright (born November 2, 1972) is the former Chairwoman of the New York State Cannabis Control Board and a former member of the New York State Assembly from the 56th district, which includes parts of Bedford-Stuyvesant in Brooklyn.

On September 1, 2021, Wright was selected by Governor Kathy Hochul to chair the Cannabis Control Board of the newly created New York Office of Cannabis Management.

== Life and career ==
Wright was born and raised in Brooklyn, New York, living down the block from the home she was raised in. A graduate of Duke University and the University of Chicago Law School, Wright practiced law both in private firms and as a public defender with Brooklyn Law Services.

Previously, Wright was the chairperson of Brooklyn Community Board 3, and also formerly owned a neighborhood coffee shop. In 2009, Wright ran for the New York City Council against incumbent Albert Vann but lost.

== New York State Assembly ==
After sixteen years representing the district, Assemblymember Annette Robinson announced that she would retire instead of seek another term in 2016. Soon after, Wright announced her intentions to run to replace her. Facing Karen Cherry in the Democratic primary, Wright won the nomination by a 59% to 41% margin.

Wright won the general election unopposed, and was sworn into office on January 1, 2017. Wright did not run in the Democratic primary for her Assembly seat in 2020 so that she could run for the New York State Senate.

== New York State Senate campaign ==
On January 11, 2020, State Senator Velmanette Montgomery, representing New York's 25th State Senate district, announced that she would be retiring and not running for re-election in 2020. As part of this announcement, she endorsed Wright as her successor, and Wright entered the race against schoolteacher Jabari Brisport, and former Montgomery staffer Jason Salmon.

More than a month after the Democratic primary was held on June 23, 2020, the final absentee ballots were counted, and Brisport was named the nominee with a 13-point lead over Wright. Salmon finished in third.

== Chair of the Cannabis Control Board ==
Since September 6, 2021, Wright has been chair of the Office of Cannabis Management's Cannabis Control Board, where she is charged with deliberating regulatory and tax policies regarding medical and adult-use cannabis in New York State.

Political offices
Preceded by Annette Robinson	New York Assembly, 56th District; 2017–present	Incumbent
