= Diana Fortuna =

American businesswoman

Diana Fortuna (born 1956) is an American businesswoman, who is the chief financial officer and deputy general manager of the Metropolitan Opera. She spent about 15 years working in government budget positions and was the president of the Citizens Budget Commission in New York City from 1998 to February 2008.

== Early life ==
Fortuna was raised in Detroit, Michigan, graduated from Harvard University, and received an MBA from Columbia Business School. She is the daughter of Walter and Marilyn Fortuna.

== Career ==
=== Public sector ===
In the early 1980s, Fortuna began her career at New York City's Office of Management and Budget, where she eventually became Deputy Budget Director under Mayor Ed Koch. Beginning in 1990, she served in the New York State Office of Federal Affairs in Washington, D.C., where she analyzed federal policy issues. In 1993, she became a policy aide to the Administrator of the U.S. Health Care Financing Administration, and in 1995, she joined the White House Domestic Policy Council, becoming Associate Director and working on welfare, health, disability and national service issues.

In 1998, Fortuna became the president of the Citizens Budget Commission, a non-profit watchdog group that monitors the finances and operations of New York City and New York State government. While at the CBC, Fortuna generally advocated controlling New York State spending more and reducing New York State's public debt load. She also supported Mayor Mike Bloomberg's plan to implement congestion pricing in New York City.

Crain's New York Business called Fortuna "One of the most well-known advocates for fiscal responsibility in New York". When Fortuna left the CBC, New York City Comptroller William C. Thompson, Jr. stated, "Diana Fortuna has done an outstanding job as President of the Citizens Budget Commission over the past nine years. Under her leadership, the CBC has fulfilled a critical role as a non-partisan watchdog of both New York City and New York State finances. Throughout her tenure, she has been a strong advocate of fiscal reform and has offered constructive advice to City and State government at every level".

In 2005 New York Common Cause honored Fortuna with the Making Peoples' Voices Heard Award for her work in helping to advance the movement for reform of New York State government. Fortuna sits on the e-Treasury Pennsylvania Advisory Commission.

=== Metropolitan Opera ===
Fortuna left the Citizen's Budget Commission in February 2008 to join the Metropolitan Opera as its budget director and soon became its Acting Chief Financial Officer. Fortuna said of joining the Met, "As someone who is interested in the performing arts, it seemed like a great opportunity to enter that field with a perspective I know very well, which is budgeting." Fortuna is now the Met's Chief Financial Officer. She said, "I felt very drawn to what the Met is trying to do, which is to keep classical music alive and well and meaningful".

In 2014, in addition to her CFO position, Fortuna was made deputy general manager.

== Personal life ==
Fortuna is married to David Yassky, a professor of law and Dean Emeritus of Pace University School of Law, who is a former Chair of the New York City Taxi and Limousine Commission and New York City Council member. They live in Brooklyn Heights and have two daughters Susan and Margaret.

Fortuna has performed in amateur Gilbert and Sullivan productions, taking roles at Harvard and Columbia (the Barnard G&S Society) and with the Victorian Lyric Opera Company (while living in Washington, DC) and other groups. She has continued to sing in her free time, with such groups as Vertical Players Repertory and Brooklyn's Grace and Spiritus Chorale.
