= Eon Huntley =

American politician (born 1984)

Member-elect of the New York State Assembly from the 56th district
- Assuming office January 2027
- Succeeding: Stefani Zinerman

Personal details
- Born: 1984 (age 41–42)
- Party: Democratic
- Other political affiliations: Democratic Socialists of America (Note: The Democratic Socialists of America (DSA) are not a registered political party. Instead, they are a political organization for those with democratic socialist ideologies.)
- Education: Parsons School of Design (BFA)

Eon Tyrell Huntley (born 1984) is an American politician. He is the member-elect of the New York State Assembly from the 56th district, which comprises the neighborhoods Crown Heights and Bedford–Stuyvesant. Prior to his election, he worked as a fashion designer for Armani Exchange and working as E.D., as well as a retail worker for Barneys New York and Bergdorf Goodman.

== Biography ==
=== Early life and career ===
Eon Tyrell Huntley was born in 1984 in East New York. His father was a nurse who emigrated from Guyana, and his mother was a NYNEX worker with whom she picketed during the 1989 NYNEX strike; they separated during his childhood.

Having aspirations as a fashion designer, Huntley went to High School of Art and Design, graduating in 2002. He later attended the Parsons School of Design. After starting as an assistant designer for Liz Claiborne in 2006, his work as a fashion designer included designing men's dress shirts and women’s woven tops for Armani Exchange and working as E.D.'s director of women's clothing design.

Huntley retired as a designer due to economic concerns with having two children, joining Barneys New York after discovering its unionized workforce. After Barneys closed in 2020, he began working as a sales associate at Bergdorf Goodman, where he promotes clothing for The Row in the women's section.

=== Political career ===
During the COVID-19 pandemic, Huntley worked as a community organizer. He also became president of a Parent Teacher's Association, and co-founded a non-profit to address food insecurity.

Huntley ran as a primary challenger to centrist-leaning Stefani Zinerman in the 2024 New York State Assembly election, receiving the endorsement of the Democratic Socialists of America and state senator Jabari Brisport. The New York Daily News profiled his campaign as an example of a left-wing surge against moderate New York politicians, drawing comparisons to Jamaal Bowman's subsequently-unsuccessful effort to fend off George Latimer in that year's congressional primary. Huntley narrowly lost to Zinerman by a margin of 516 votes.

Huntley made another primary challenge in the 2026 New York State Assembly election against Zinerman. During the primary, he supported increasing the state minimum wage to $30 and universal child care, taxing the rich to improve public transportation and cracking down on deed theft. He was endorsed by the New York Democratic Socialists of America and New York Communities for Change. He won the primary, unseating Zinerman. He later won the general election with 98.1% of the vote without any major party opposition.

A resident of Bedford–Stuyvesant, Huntley has two daughters and is married to Rebecca. He is a member of the New York City Democratic Socialists of America.
