= Annette Robinson =

American politician

Annette M. Robinson
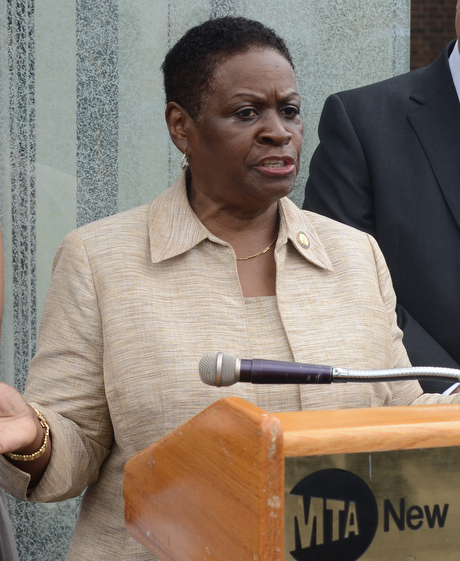

Member of the New York State Assembly from the 56th district
- In office February 22, 2002 – December 31, 2016
- Preceded by: Albert Vann
- Succeeded by: Tremaine Wright

Member of the New York City Council from the 36th district
- In office January 1, 1992 – December 31, 2001
- Preceded by: New district
- Succeeded by: Albert Vann

Personal details
- Born: May 24, 1940 (age 86)
- Party: Democratic
- Spouse: William Robinson
- Children: 6
- Education: Southern New Hampshire University (B.S., M.S.)

Annette Robinson (born 1940) formerly represented the 56th district of the New York State Assembly, which includes most of Bedford-Stuyvesant, Crown Heights and Bushwick, from 2002 to 2016.

== Early life and education ==
Annette Marie Robinson was born in Harlem and raised in Bedford-Stuyvesant, Brooklyn where she was active in the local Catholic church and the community. She studied dance and performed at the Brooklyn Academy of Music at age 8. She holds B.S. and master's degrees from New Hampshire College (now Southern New Hampshire University).

== Career ==
Robinson's career in politics began in 1977 when she was elected as a Community School Board District 16 member. She went on to work for N.Y.C. Comptroller Harrison J. Goldin serving three terms-as Coordinator and Liaison, and District Director for U.S. Congressman Major R. Owens and in 1991, was elected to the New York City Council representing Bedford-Stuyvesant.

She was term limited from her City Council position in 2000 and was chosen in a special election held in 2002. Robinson garnered over 90% of the vote in the special election and served as the District Leader/State Committeewoman for the 56th Assembly District. Her office was at Restoration Plaza, in Shirley Chisholm's former space.

Robinson announced that she would be retiring in 2016. On Saturday April 16, 2016, Robinson officially endorsed Brooklyn Community Board 3 chairperson Tremaine Wright to succeed her in the 56th assembly district. The endorsement took place at the campaign announcement for Tremaine Wright. Robinson stated that she was very proud to pass the torch to candidate Wright.

After her retirement, she continued to serve as the female Democratic District leader of the 56th Assembly district, and the Vice Chair of the Kings County Democratic Party, making her the second in command behind Party Boss Frank Seddio.

== Affiliations ==
In addition to her work in the New York Assembly, Robinson is the Vice-Chairwoman of the New York State Council of Black Elected Democrats.

Political offices
Preceded by New district	New York City Council, 36th district 1992 – 2001	Succeeded by Albert Vann
New York State Assembly
Preceded by Albert Vann	New York State Assembly, 56th district 2002–2016	Succeeded by Tremaine Wright
