= New York City's 36th City Council district =

- Boundaries following the 2020 census

Government
  - Councilmember: . Chi Ossé. D–Crown Heights

Population (2010)
  - Total: 148,936

Demographics
  - Black: 70%
  - Hispanic: 18%
  - White: 7%
  - Asian: 2%
  - Other: 2%

Registration
  - Democratic: 81.2%
  - Republican: 2.5%
  - No party preference: 13.6%
- Registered voters (2021) 124,480

New York City's 36th City Council district is one of 51 districts in the New York City Council. It is represented by Democrat Chi Ossé.

== Geography ==
District 36 is based largely in the Brooklyn neighborhood of Bedford–Stuyvesant, also covering some of northern Crown Heights.

The district overlaps with Brooklyn Community Boards 2, 3, and 8, and with New York's 7th, 8th, and 9th congressional districts. It also overlaps with the 18th, 20th, and 25th districts of the New York State Senate, and with the 43rd, 53rd, 54th, 55th, 56th, and 57th districts of the New York State Assembly.

== Members representing the district ==
Members	Party	Years served	Electoral history
District established January 1, 1992
Annette Robinson (Bedford–Stuyvesant)	Democratic	January 1, 1992 – December 31, 2001	Elected in 1991. Re-elected in 1993. Re-elected in 1997. Termed out and ran for New York State Assembly.
Albert Vann (Bedford–Stuyvesant)	Democratic	January 1, 2002 – December 31, 2013	Elected in 2001. Re-elected in 2003. Re-elected in 2005. Re-elected in 2009. Termed out.
Robert Cornegy (Bedford–Stuyvesant)	Democratic	January 1, 2014 – January 1, 2022	Elected in 2013. Re-elected in 2017. Termed out and ran for Brooklyn Borough President.
Chi Ossé (Crown Heights)	Democratic	January 1, 2022 –	Elected in 2021. Re-elected in 2023. Re-elected in 2025.

== Recent election results ==
=== 2025 ===
2025 New York City Council election, District 36
Primary election
Party	Candidate	Votes	%
Democratic	Chi Ossé (incumbent)	23,815	78.3
Democratic	Reginald Swiney	6,378	21.0
Write-in		236	0.8
Total votes		30,429	100
General election
Democratic	Chi Ossé (incumbent)	44,256	99.4
Write-in		268	0.6
Total votes		44,524	100.0
Democratic hold			

=== 2023 (redistricting) ===
Due to redistricting and the 2020 changes to the New York City Charter, councilmembers elected during the 2021 and 2023 City Council elections will serve two-year terms, with full four-year terms resuming after the 2025 New York City Council elections.

2023 New York City Council election, District 36
Party	Candidate	Votes	%
Democratic	Chi Ossé	7,132	
Working Families	Chi Ossé	2,603	
Total	Chi Ossé (incumbent)	9,735	98.8
Write-in		123	1.2
Total votes		9,858	100.0
Democratic hold			

=== 2021 ===
In 2019, voters in New York City approved Ballot Question 1, which implemented ranked-choice voting in all local elections. Under the new system, voters have the option to rank up to five candidates for every local office. Voters whose first-choice candidates fare poorly will have their votes redistributed to other candidates in their ranking until one candidate surpasses the 50 percent threshold. If one candidate surpasses 50 percent in first-choice votes, then ranked-choice tabulations will not occur.

2021 New York City Council election, District 36 Democratic primary
Party	Candidate	Maximum round	Maximum votes	Share in maximum round	Maximum votes First round votes Transfer votes
Democratic	Chi Ossé	4	11,149	57.0%	
Democratic	Henry Butler	4	8,402	43.0%	
Democratic	Tahirah Moore	3	6,196	28.6%	
Democratic	Robert Waterman	2	3,281	14.1%	
Democratic	Reginald Swiney	2	628	2.7%	
Write-in		1	86	0.4%	

An interactive map of District 36

2021 New York City Council election, District 36 general election
Party	Candidate	Votes	%
Democratic	Chi Ossé	18,999	99.3
Write-in		125	0.7
Total votes		19,124	100
Democratic hold			

=== 2017 ===
2017 New York City Council election, District 36
Party	Candidate	Votes	%
Democratic	Robert Cornegy (incumbent)	21,300	99.1
Write-in		195	0.9
Total votes		21,495	100
Democratic hold			

=== 2013 ===
2013 New York City Council election, District 36
Primary election
Party	Candidate	Votes	%
Democratic	Robert Cornegy	4,370	30.3
Democratic	Kirsten John Foy	4,302	29.9
Democratic	Robert Waterman	3,149	21.9
Democratic	Conrad Tillard	1,912	13.3
Democratic	Reginald Swiney	674	4.7
Write-in		6	0.0
Total votes		14,413	100
General election
Democratic	Robert Cornegy	17,334	87.3
Working Families	Kirsten John Foy	2,020	10.2
Republican	Veronica Thompson	498	2.5
Write-in		10	0.0
Total votes		19,862	100
Democratic hold			
