= The Haitian Times =

Online newspaper in Brooklyn, NYC

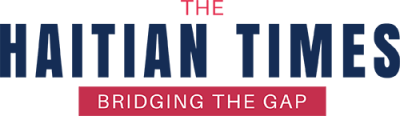
- Type: Newspaper
- Founder(s): Garry Pierre-Pierre; Yves Colon
- Founded: October 1999
- Language: English
- Headquarters: Brooklyn, New York
- Country: United States
- Website: haitiantimes.com

The Haitian Times is an online newspaper based in Brooklyn for the Haitian diaspora living in the wider area of New York City.

== History ==
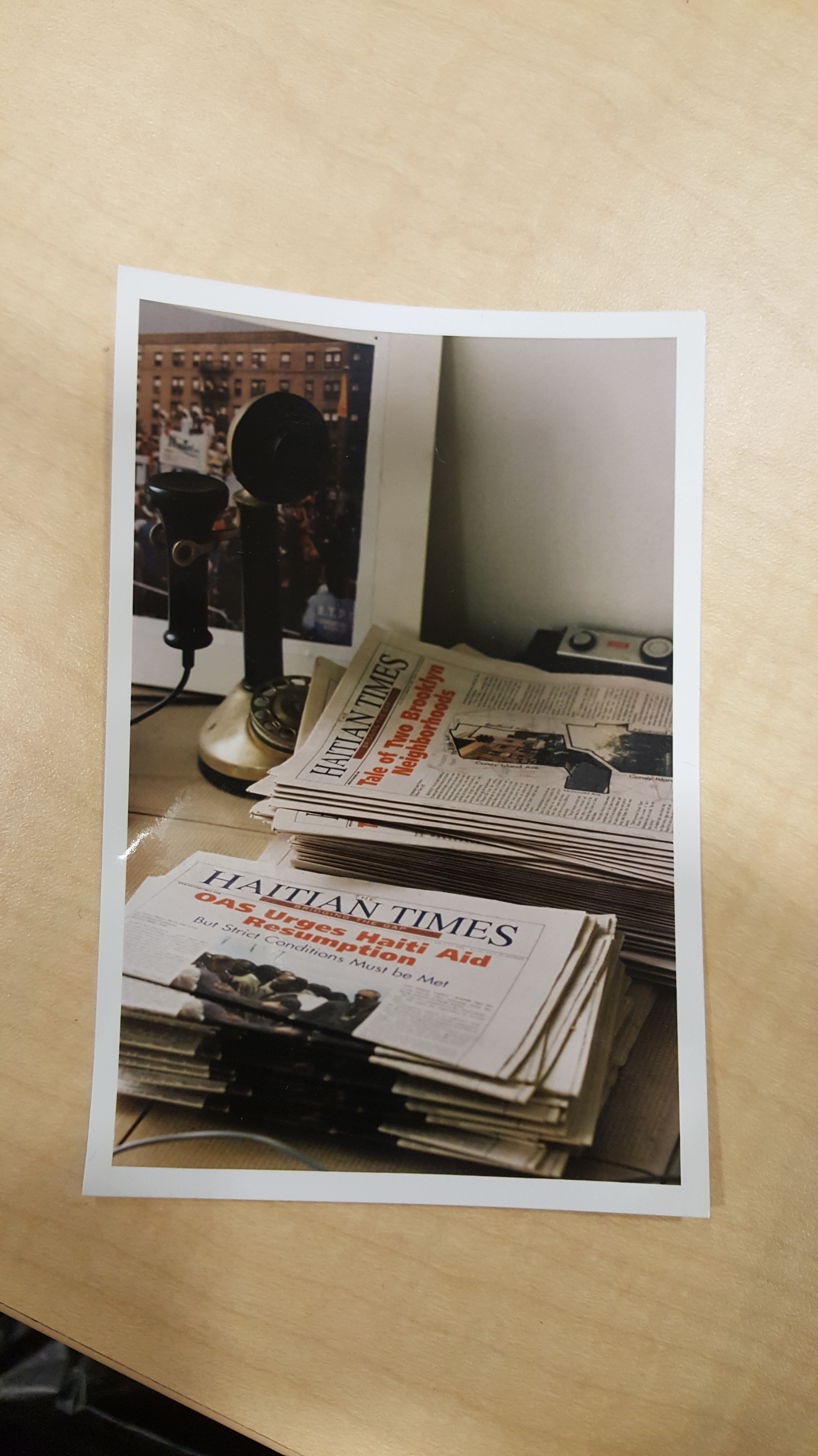
Copies of The Haitian Times

The Haitian Times was founded in 1999 in Brooklyn, New York as a daily newspaper printed in English, as opposed to French or Haitian Creole. It had published its first issue on 27 October 1999. The newspaper's launch was also put into the Congressional records when Representative Carrie Meek (D-FL) paid tribute to its founders.

It circulated 30,000 newspapers per week, 18,000 circulating in Brooklyn, 6,000 in Queens, 4,000 in Long Island, 1,000 in New Jersey, and 1,000 beyond the greater metropolitan New York City area. The newspaper also covered news out of Haiti in the tradition of mainstream American journalism.

Garry Pierre-Pierre, a reporter with the New York Times and Miami Herald reporter Yves Colon founded The Haitian Times. Colon, who served as an editor, left the publication after two months. Pierre-Pierre assumed the editorship in addition to his role as publisher.

From 1999 to 2012, most Haitian churches in the city subscribed to the paper, providing stacks of copies to its congregations at the doors.

=== Patrick Dorismond ===
The Haitian Times covered the Patrick Dorismond shooting, a Haitian-American security guard who was shot by an undercover police officer near Madison Square Garden. The story placed the paper at the forefront and its reporting was quoted and followed by mainstream news publications from the Los Angeles Times to the New York Times.

=== 2010 Haiti earthquake ===
The newspaper again commanded center stage when the Haiti earthquake devastated much of Port-au-Prince and towns miles away. The staff was one of the earliest set of journalists to arrive in Haiti. Reporters and photographers spent months on the ground, chronicling the destruction and the rescue, clean up and eventual rebuilding.

== See also ==
- List of newspapers in New York
- List of newspapers in Haiti
