= New York City's 33rd City Council district =

- Boundaries following the 2020 census

Government
  - Councilmember: . Lincoln Restler. D–Greenpoint

Population (2010)
  - Total: 170,735

Demographics
  - White: 74%
  - Hispanic: 14%
  - Black: 6%
  - Asian: 5%
  - Other: 2%

Registration
  - Democratic: 73.4%
  - Republican: 6.4%
  - No party preference: 17.5%
- Registered voters (2021) 134,647

New York City's 33rd City Council district is one of 51 districts in the New York City Council. It is currently represented by Democrat Lincoln Restler, who took office in 2022.

== Geography ==
District 33 covers three distinct sections of Brooklyn's western shoreline: Greenpoint in the north, Vinegar Hill and parts of Williamsburg in the center, and Boerum Hill, Brooklyn Heights, Dumbo, and some of Downtown Brooklyn in the south. Brooklyn Navy Yard and Brooklyn Bridge Park are also located within the district.

The district overlaps with Brooklyn Community Boards 1, 2, 3, and 6, and with New York's 7th, 8th, and 12th congressional districts. It also overlaps with the 18th, 25th, and 26th districts of the New York State Senate, and with the 50th, 52nd, 53rd, and 57th districts of the New York State Assembly.

== List of members representing the district ==
| Members | Party | Years served | Electoral history |
|---|---|---|---|
District established January 1, 1974
| Samuel Horwitz (Coney Island) | Democratic | January 1, 1974 – December 31, 1991 | Elected in 1973. Re-elected in 1974. Re-elected in 1977. Re-elected in 1982. Re-elected in 1985. Re-elected in 1989. Redistricted to the 47th district. |
| Ken Fisher (Brooklyn Heights) | Democratic | January 1, 1992 – December 31, 2001 | Redistricted from the 29th district and re-elected in 1991. Re-elected in 1993. Re-elected in 1997. Termed out and ran for Brooklyn Borough President. |
| David Yassky (Brooklyn Heights) | Democratic | January 1, 2002 – December 31, 2008 | Elected in 2001. Re-elected in 2003. Re-elected in 2005. Retired to run for New York City Comptroller. |
| Stephen Levin (Greenpoint) | Democratic | January 1, 2010 – December 31, 2021 | Elected in 2009. Re-elected in 2013. Re-elected in 2017. Termed out. |
| Lincoln Restler (Greenpoint) | Democratic | January 1, 2022 – | Elected in 2021. Re-elected in 2023. Re-elected in 2025. |

== Recent election results ==
=== 2025 ===
2025 New York City Council election, District 33
Primary election
| Party | Candidate | Votes | % |
|---|---|---|---|
| Democratic | Lincoln Restler (incumbent) | 25,697 | 75.3 |
| Democratic | Sabrina Gates | 8,259 | 24.2 |
| Write-in | | 184 | 0.5 |
| Total votes | | 34,140 | 100.0 |
General election
| Democratic | Lincoln Restler | 38,576 | |
| Working Families | Lincoln Restler | 11,389 | |
| Total | Lincoln Restler (incumbent) | 49,965 | 98.4 |
| Write-in | | 788 | 1.6 |
| Total votes | | 50,753 | 100.0 |
| Democratic hold | | | |

=== 2023 (redistricting) ===
Due to redistricting and the 2020 changes to the New York City Charter, councilmembers elected during the 2021 and 2023 City Council elections will serve two-year terms, with full four-year terms resuming after the 2025 New York City Council elections.

2023 New York City Council election, District 33
| Party | Candidate | Votes | % |
|---|---|---|---|
| Democratic | Lincoln Restler | 8,199 | |
| Working Families | Lincoln Restler | 2,726 | |
| Total | Lincoln Restler (incumbent) | 10,925 | 87.0 |
| Republican | Martha Rowen | 1,244 | |
| Conservative | Martha Rowen | 274 | |
| Total | Martha Rowen | 1,518 | 12.1 |
| Write-in | | 112 | 0.9 |
| Total votes | | 12,555 | 100.0 |
| Democratic hold | | | |

=== 2021 ===
In 2019, voters in New York City approved Ballot Question 1, which implemented ranked-choice voting in all local elections. Under the new system, voters have the option to rank up to five candidates for every local office. Voters whose first-choice candidates fare poorly will have their votes redistributed to other candidates in their ranking until one candidate surpasses the 50 percent threshold. If one candidate surpasses 50 percent in first-choice votes, then ranked-choice tabulations will not occur.

2021 New York City Council election, District 33 Democratic primary
| Party | Candidate | Maximum round | Maximum votes | Share in maximum round | Maximum votes First round votes Transfer votes |
|---|---|---|---|---|---|
| Democratic | Lincoln Restler | 7 | 16,537 | 63.9% | |
| Democratic | Elizabeth Adams | 7 | 9,332 | 36.1% | |
| Democratic | Victoria Cambranes | 6 | 2,435 | 8.6% | |
| Democratic | Sabrina Gates | 6 | 1,940 | 6.9% | |
| Democratic | Toba Potosky | 6 | 1,892 | 6.7% | |
| Democratic | April Somboun | 5 | 1,588 | 5.5% | |
| Democratic | Stu Sherman | 4 | 1,197 | 4.1% | |
| Democratic | Ben Solotaire | 2 | 623 | 2.1% | |
| Write-in | | 1 | 102 | 0.2% | |

An interactive map of District 33

2021 New York City Council election, District 33 general election
| Party | Candidate | Votes | % |
|---|---|---|---|
| Democratic | Lincoln Restler | 21,077 | 98.3 |
| Write-in | | 344 | 2.7 |
| Total votes | | 21,421 | 100 |
| Democratic hold | | | |

=== 2017 ===
2017 New York City Council election, District 33
| Party | Candidate | Votes | % |
|---|---|---|---|
| Democratic | Stephen Levin (incumbent) | 19,190 | 88.2 |
| Progress for All | Victoria Cambranes | 2,451 | 11.3 |
| Write-in | | 112 | 0.5 |
| Total votes | | 21,753 | 100 |
| Democratic hold | | | |

=== 2013 ===
2013 New York City Council election, District 33
Primary election
| Party | Candidate | Votes | % |
|---|---|---|---|
| Democratic | Stephen Levin (incumbent) | 13,608 | 73.5 |
| Democratic | Stephen Pierson | 4,902 | 26.5 |
| Write-in | | 8 | 0.0 |
| Total votes | | 18,518 | 100 |
General election
| Democratic | Stephen Levin | 17,094 | |
| Working Families | Stephen Levin | 2,465 | |
| Total | Stephen Levin (incumbent) | 19,559 | 91.9 |
| Conservative | John Jasilli | 1,666 | 7.8 |
| Write-in | | 56 | 0.3 |
| Total votes | | 21,281 | 100 |
| Democratic hold | | | |
