= Lincoln Restler =

American politician

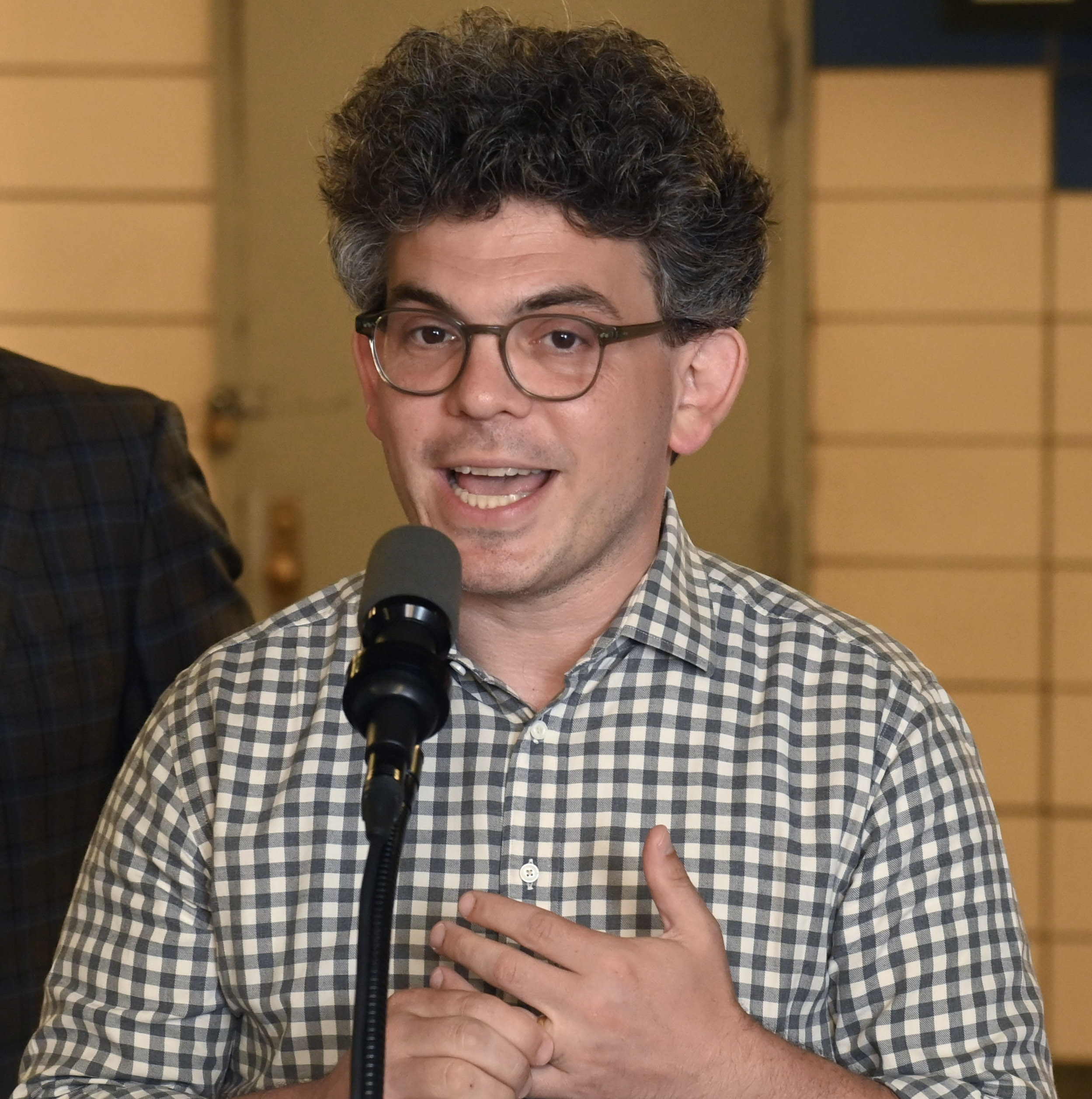

Member of the New York City Council from the 33rd district
- Incumbent
- Assumed office January 1, 2022
- Preceded by: Stephen Levin

Personal details
- Born: March 19, 1984 (age 42)
- Party: Democratic
- Spouse: Anna Poe-Kest
- Education: Brown University (BA)
- Website: Official website Campaign website

Lincoln P. Restler (born March 19, 1984) is an American politician and civil servant from New York City, who is a member of the New York City Council for the 33rd district which covers Greenpoint, parts of Vinegar Hill, Williamsburg, Boerum Hill, Brooklyn Heights, Dumbo, and other Downtown neighborhoods in northern Brooklyn. Restler co-founded reform political club, New Kings Democrats, and was a New York State Democratic District Leader. He held several positions in municipal government before running for City Council.

== Early life and education ==
Restler grew up in Brooklyn Heights on Pierrepont Street with an older sister. Restler is Jewish and attended the Reform Brooklyn Heights Synagogue in his youth. His father, Peter, founded private equity firm CAI Funds and his mother, Susan, is a former managing director at J.P. Morgan & Co.

He attended the Packer Collegiate Institute and graduated from Brown University with a bachelor in Africana Studies and Latin American Studies in 2006. He was schoolmates with future political opponent and eventual Council predecessor, Stephen Levin.

== Career ==
Restler became involved in politics while in undergrad with the Providence, Rhode Island City Council re-election campaign of David Segal, and in the 2008 presidential primary supporting Barack Obama.

He worked for the City of New York as an employee at the Department of Small Business Services and Department of Consumer Protection. Restler co-founded reform club New Kings Democrats in 2008, and worked in the Bill de Blasio administration. He worked on the de Blasio campaign and as senior policy advisor to the mayor.

In 2020, Restler resigned from the de Blasio administration and joined the St. Nicks Alliance.

=== Elected office ===
Restler was elected District Leader in the 50th Assembly District in 2010 when he was 26. He was supported by U.S. Representative Nydia Velasquez and then-City Councilmember Tish James. Restler lost the seat in 2012 to Chris Olechowski by 19 votes.

In 2021, Restler ran for the New York City Council 33rd district and defeated seven other candidates to win the Democratic nomination, and ran in the November general unopposed. He received endorsements from State Senators Julia Salazar and Jabari Brisport, the Working Families Party, Public Advocate Jumaane Williams, and Velasquez. In the 7th round of ranked choice voting, he prevailed over closest candidate Elizabeth Adams 63.9%-36.1%.

On the City Council, Restler is part of the Progressive Caucus.

In early 2026, Restler opposed bill 175-B, which proposed to establish "buffer zones" limiting protest near educational institutions, saying that he was concerned it would limit protests on college campuses. When the City Council passed the bill, he supported Mayor Zohran Mamdani's veto of it.

== Personal life ==
Restler is married to Anna Poe-Kest, the chief of staff to director of the New York City Mayor's Office of Management and Budget Sherif Soliman as of May 2026.

== Electoral history ==
=== 2025 ===
2025 New York City Council Democratic primary, District 33
Party	Candidate	Votes	%
Democratic	Lincoln Restler (incumbent)	25,697	75.3
Democratic	Sabrina N. Gates	8,259	24.2
Write-in		184	0.5
Total votes		34,140	100.0

2025 New York City Council election, District 33
Party	Candidate	Votes	%
Democratic	Lincoln Restler	38,576	76.0
Working Families	Lincoln Restler	11,389	22.4
Total	Lincoln Restler (incumbent)	49,965	98.4
Write-in		788	1.6
Total votes		50,753	100.0
Democratic hold			

=== 2023 ===
2023 New York City Council election, District 33
Party	Candidate	Votes	%
Democratic	Lincoln Restler	8,199	65.3
Working Families	Lincoln Restler	2,726	21.7
Total	Lincoln Restler (incumbent)	10,925	87.0
Republican	Martha Rowen	1,244	9.9
Conservative	Martha Rowen (Note: Shared with "Medical Freedom" ballot line.)	274	2.2
Total	Martha Rowen	1,518	12.1
Write-in		112	0.9
Total votes		12,555	100.0
Democratic hold			

=== 2021 ===
2021 New York City Council Democratic primary, District 33
Party	Candidate	Maximum round	Maximum votes	Share in maximum round	Maximum votes First round votes Transfer votes
Democratic	Lincoln Restler	7	16,537	63.9%	
Democratic	Elizabeth E. Adams	7	9,332	36.1%	
Democratic	Victoria E. Cambranes	6	2,435	8.6%	
Democratic	Sabrina N. Gates	6	1,940	6.9%	
Democratic	Toba Potosky	6	1,892	6.7%	
Democratic	April Somboun	5	1,588	5.5%	
Democratic	Stu Sherman	4	1,197	4.1%	
Democratic	Ben Solotaire	2	623	2.1%	
Write-In		1	102	0.3%	

2021 New York City Council election, District 33
Party	Candidate	Votes	%
Democratic	Lincoln Restler	21,077	98.4
Write-in		344	1.6
Total votes		21,421	100.0
Democratic hold			
