= Stephen Levin (politician) =

American politician

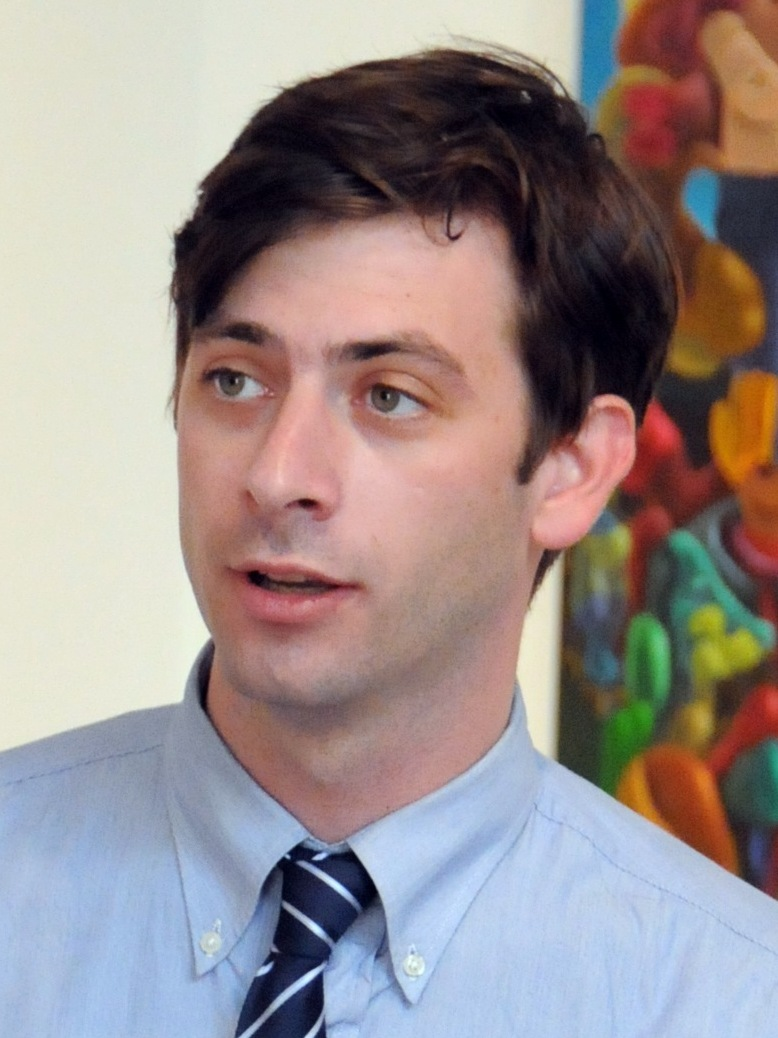
- Levin in 2010

Member of the New York City Council from the 33rd District
- In office January 1, 2010 – December 31, 2021
- Preceded by: David Yassky
- Succeeded by: Lincoln Restler

Personal details
- Born: 1980 or 1981 (age 45–46) Plainfield, New Jersey, U.S.
- Party: Democratic
- Education: Brown University (B.A.)
- Website: Official website

Stephen T. Levin (born c. 1980/1981) is an American non-profit executive and politician. He is the CEO of Solar One, a green energy advocacy not-for-profit, and a former New York City councilmember for the 33rd district.

== Early life and education ==
Levin grew up in Plainfield, New Jersey. Related to former U.S. senator Carl Levin of Michigan and former congressman Sander Levin from Michigan's 9th congressional district, he graduated from Brown University with a degree in Classics and Comparative Literature.

== Career ==
He moved to Brooklyn and began his career working with the Lead Safe House Program at the Ridgewood Bushwick Senior Citizens Council. In 2006 he went to work as chief of staff to New York State assemblymember Vito Lopez.

Levin was arrested, along with Public Advocate Bill de Blasio, as an act of civil disobedience in protest of the closure of Long Island College Hospital in Brooklyn. He delivered 7,000 petitions to SUNY officials there demanding that the hospital stay open.

In September 2010, he was named one of City & State's "40 under 40" for being a young, influential member of New York City politics.

=== New York City Council ===
Levin was elected to replace David Yassky, who vacated the position to run for New York City Comptroller, in a competitive seven-way race with the support of Assemblyman Vito Lopez. Lopez helped him secure endorsements from the United Federation of Teachers (UFT), DC 37, the Working Families Party, the New York League of Conservation Voters, Senator Charles Schumer, Brooklyn Borough President Marty Markowitz, and Congresswoman Carolyn Maloney. Most importantly, Lopez secured for his former employee the support of the Zaloni faction of the Jewish Satmar community in Williamsburg. That Hasidic faction provided Levin with his margin of victory in 2009.

In 2013, Levin introduced participatory budgeting, a democratic process in which community members directly decide how to spend part of a public budget, in his district. At that time, Levin was one of eight members of the city council to offer participatory budgeting to his constituents.

Levin originally opposed the Rose Plaza housing complex on the Williamsburg waterfront. The project initially called for 20 percent affordable housing and 30 three-bedroom apartments. He then voted for the project when the developer agreed to build 60 three-bedroom apartments and 14 four-bedroom apartments, all priced below the market rate. The development passed in council 18-1. Levin also negotiated an agreement with the Community Preservation Corporation Resources (CPCR) over the Domino Sugar factory redevelopment plan. He has also worked with Assemblyman Lopez to seek federal subsidies for public housing developments in Brooklyn.

Levin introduced a bill to reduce fines for street food vendors over procedural violations. The bill passed at the City Council on February 27, 2013, and reduced regulations for them.

Levin is term-limited and could not run for re-election in 2021. His term on the City Council ended on January 1, 2022.

=== Solar One ===
In his post City Council career, he has taken on the role of CEO of Solar One.

== Election history ==
Location	Year	Election	Results
NYC Council District 33	2009	Democratic Primary	√ Stephen Levin 33.71% Jo Anne Simon 20.16% Isaac Abraham 12.56% Evan R. Thies 12.42% Kenneth Diamondstone 8.59% Doug Biviano 7.31% Ken Baer 5.26%
NYC Council District 33	2009	General	√ Stephen Levin (D) 93.33% Elizabeth Tretter (Conservative) 6.60%
NYC Council District 33	2013	Democratic Primary	√ Stephen Levin 73.52% Stephen E. Pierson 26.48%
NYC Council District 33	2013	General	√ Stephen Levin (D) 91.91% John Jasilli (R) 7.83%
NYC Council District 33	2017	General	√ Stephen Levin (D) 89% Victoria Cambranes (Other) 11%

Political offices
Preceded by David Yassky	New York City Council, 33rd district 2010–2021	Succeeded by Lincoln Restler
