= New York Communities for Change =

Advocacy organization

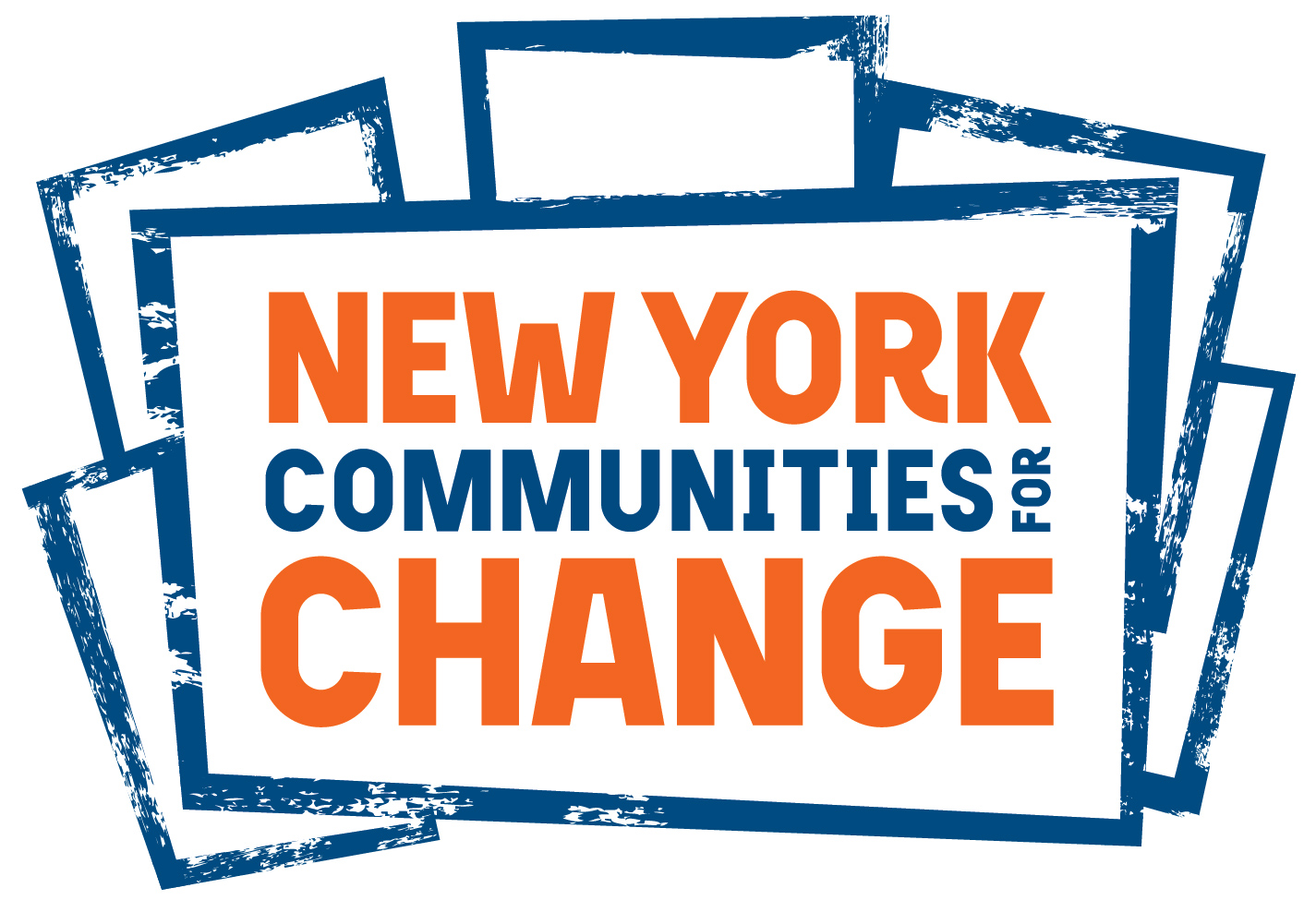
- Abbreviation: NYCC
- Formation: 2010
- Founders: Jon Kest, Marie Pierre
- Headquarters: Brooklyn, NY
- Website: www.nycommunities.org

New York Communities for Change (NYCC) is a 501(c)(4) nonprofit focused on issues including housing, education, and wages for low-income New Yorkers.

== History ==
In 2010, Jon Kest, previously the lead organizer for New York's affiliate of the national Association of Community Organizations for Reform Now organization, started New York Communities for Change after ACORN's demise. After Kest's death in 2012, Jonathan Westin succeeded him and currently serves as the executive director.

== Issues and actions ==
=== Push for NYC pension funds not to invest in BlackRock ===
In 2025, NYCC representatives voiced frustration with New York City Comptroller Brad Lander and the New York City Comptroller's Office in regard to helping keep solvent three pension funds for retirees of various New York City employers: the New York City Employees Retirement System, the New York City Teachers Retirement System, and the New York City Board of Education Retirement System. The Comptroller's office is supposed to determine which asset management companies are environmentally friendly and reject investing city employees' retirement funds in companies that have a poor record. NYCC and other environmental groups argued that Lander was stalling his office's investigation into controversial investment company BlackRock in order to delay divesting from it. NYCC threatened to stop endorsing Lander in his next campaign because he missed a September 2025 deadline to respond to its representatives.
