= Mark Winston Griffith =

American activist & journalist

- Born: February 6, 1963 (age 63); Brooklyn, N.Y., USA
- Education: Brown University (B.A.); University of Ibadan (Nigeria) (M.A.)
- Occupation: Journalist

Mark Winston Griffith (born February 6, 1963) is a New York City journalist, community organizer, and social entrepreneur. He is the co-founder of the Central Brooklyn Federal Credit Union, founder of the Brooklyn Movement Center, and the co-creator and co-host of the podcast School Colors. Currently, he serves as the Co-Executive Director of Free Speech TV.

== Early life and education ==
Griffith was born in Brooklyn and raised in Brooklyn and Queens. His father, of Jamaican and Guyanese parentage, was a NYC Department of Education truant officer and artist. His mother, born in Jamaica, was an administrative assistant for the NYC Fire Department.

Griffith was educated in New York City public schools before attending the Lawrenceville School for high school, where he was its first Black student body president. He received a B.A. in English and Africana Studies from Brown University in 1985 and an M.A. in English Literature from the University of Ibadan in Nigeria in 1988.

== Community organizing and politics ==
As a student at Brown University, Griffith was the president of the Black student union and was active on campus politics, including Brown Students for Jesse Jackson and Free South Africa campaigns. In 1985 he was among a group of Black student leaders who led a series of protests that eventually led to campus reforms.

From 1985 to 1987, Mark was the chief of staff for a New York State Assemblyman Clarence Norman Jr. and the assistant director of the Crown Heights Neighborhood Improvement Association (CHNIA) from 1989 to 1991.

While at (CHNIA), Griffith founded the Central Brooklyn Partnership and in 1993 co-founded the Central Brooklyn Federal Credit Union with Errol T. Louis. At the time, the credit union was the largest Black-owned community development cooperative in the nation and Griffith and Louis were dubbed “hip hop bankers”. The pair was recognized by New York Magazine among their "10 New Yorkers Making a Difference", "with energy, vision and independent thinking"; and Griffith was named one of Crain’s “40 under 40”.

From 2006 to 2008 Griffith was Economic Justice Fellow at the Drum Major Institute for Public Policy and in 2008 was named interim Executive Director of DMI to succeed Andrea Batista Schlesinger.

On September 15, 2009 Griffith ran in the Democratic Party primary for the New York City Council and came second to long-time incumbent Al Vann in an eight-person race, losing by 735 votes. Griffith again lost to Vann as the Working Families candidate in the General Election on November 3, 2009.

From 2011 to 2022 Griffith served as the founding Executive Director of the Black-led community organizing group the Brooklyn Movement Center. While at the Brooklyn Movement Center he also co-founded the Central Brooklyn Food Coop.

In 2015, Griffith was named to the New York Observer’s “Very Short List of Change Agents”.

Griffith has taught community organizing at the CUNY School of Labor and Urban Studies and currently (2023) teaches community economic development at Pratt Institute.

== Journalism ==
Griffith originated the community development column at Gotham Gazette in 1999 and has written articles for The Nation, the New York Times, the New York Daily News, and City Limits.

From 2009 to 2011 he taught urban social reporting at the Craig Newmark Graduate School of Journalism at CUNY.

Griffith has served on the Boards of City Limits, Free Speech TV, and the new site The City.

Griffith created the citizen journalism site Brooklyn Deep, and went on to co-create and co-host the documentary podcast School Colors. The second season of School Colors was distributed by NPR's Code Switch in 2022.

In 2022, Griffith was named the Associate Director for Anti-Racist Partnerships and Transformation at the progressive television news outlet, Free Speech TV. Later that year, Griffith received the David Prize which annually honors five visionary New Yorkers with $1 million for “redefining and revoicing New York City’s public narratives”.

In February 2024, Griffith was named the Co-Executive Director of Free Speech TV.

== Personal life ==
Griffith lives in Crown Heights, Brooklyn with his two sons
