= Albert Vann =

American politician (1934–2022)

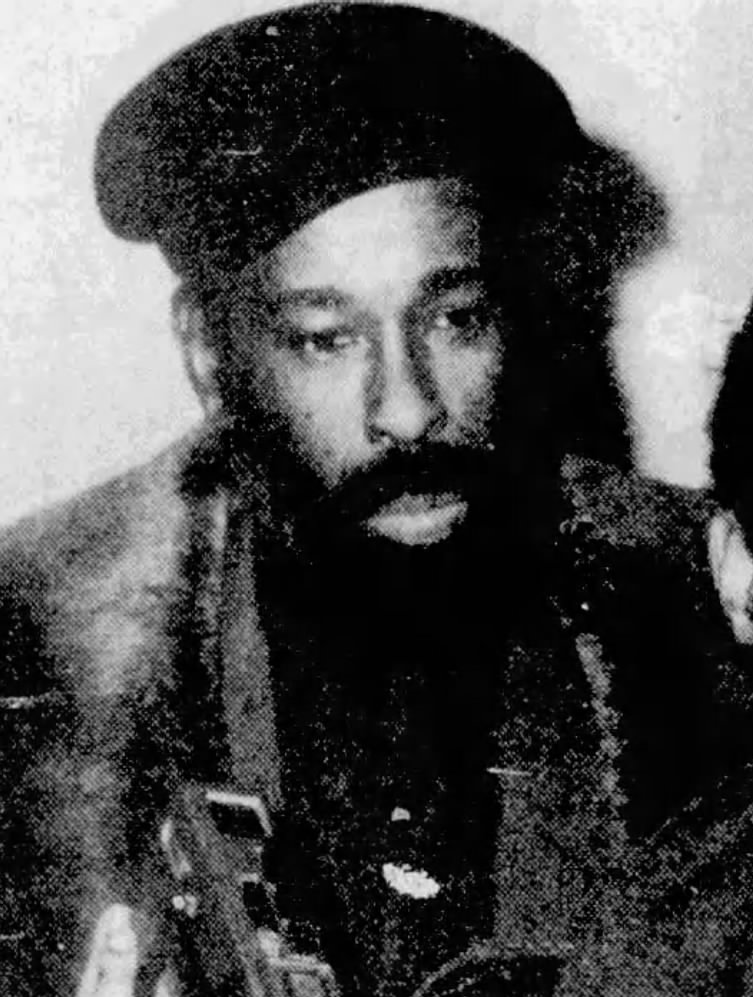
- Vann in 1977

Member of the New York City Council from the 36th district
- In office January 1, 2002 – December 31, 2013
- Preceded by: Annette Robinson
- Succeeded by: Robert Cornegy

Member of the New York State Assembly from the 56th district
- In office January 1, 1975 – December 31, 2001
- Preceded by: Calvin Williams
- Succeeded by: Annette Robinson

Personal details
- Born: November 19, 1934 New York City, U.S.
- Died: July 14, 2022 (aged 87) New York City, U.S.
- Party: Democratic
- Spouse: Mildred Cooke (m. 1967)
- Children: 4
- Education: Toledo University (BBA); Yeshiva University (MA); Long Island University (MS)

Military service
- Branch/service: United States Marine Corps
- Years of service: 1952–1955

Albert Vann (November 19, 1934 – July 14, 2022) was an American politician and a member of the New York City Council from Brooklyn, representing the 36th district, which includes parts of Bedford-Stuyvesant and Crown Heights. He was a Democrat.

== Early life and education ==
Vann was born to Nina (McGlone) Vann and Benjamin Palme on November 19, 1934, in Brooklyn, New York City; his parents had moved there from North Carolina during the Great Migration. He attended Franklin K. Lane High School and was in the United States Marine Corps from 1952 to 1955. After that, he earned a BBA from Toledo University in 1959, and later earned master's degrees from both Yeshiva University (in education), and Long Island University (in guidance counseling). He has served in different capacities as a teacher and administrator in New York public schools over the course of his professional career.

He was a member of Alpha Phi Alpha fraternity.

He was one of the founders of Medgar Evers College of the City University of New York, and was also one of the founders of the African American Teachers Association. Vann was a past instructor at Vassar College's Urban Center for Black Studies.

== Political career ==
Vann was a member of the New York State Assembly (56th D.) from 1975 to 2001, sitting in the 181st, 182nd, 183rd, 184th, 185th, 186th, 187th, 188th, 189th, 190th, 191st, 192nd, 193rd, and 194th New York State Legislatures.

Vann exchanged seats with Annette Robinson after the New York City Council enacted a term limit. Vann was elected to the New York City Council in November 2001, and ex-City Councilwoman Robinson was elected to the State Assembly in 2002 to fill the vacancy. Both represented the 36th City Council District, and Vann remained in the City Council until 2013.

In the November 3, 2009 election, Vann was challenged by Mark Winston Griffith (Drum Major Institute's executive director), who ran on the Working Families Party ballot line. Vann defeated Griffith and went on to serve until 2013, when term limits prevented him from seeking re-election. He was succeeded by fellow Democrat Robert Cornegy on January 1, 2014.

In response to the police shooting of Sean Bell in 2006, Vann alleged that the incident arose from "institutional racism." He then proceeded to mock the suggestion that African-American New Yorkers living in high-crime neighborhoods should adopt certain behaviors to avoid confrontations with police officers.

On October 23, 2009, Vann voted to extend term limits for the New York City Mayor and the City Council.

== Personal life and death ==
Vann married Mildred Cooke in 1967, and they had four children. He was a resident of Bedford-Stuyvesant, Brooklyn, where he died on July 14, 2022, aged 87. An array of political figures memorialized him, including Letitia James, Eric Adams, Adrienne Adams, and Hakeem Jeffries.

New York State Assembly
Preceded by Calvin Williams	New York State Assembly; 56th district 1975–2001	Succeeded by Annette Robinson
New York City Council
Preceded by Annette Robinson	New York City Council; 36th district 2002–2013	Succeeded by Robert Cornegy
