= 2024 New York Democratic presidential primary =

- April 2, 2024

307 delegates (268 pledged, 39 unpledged) to the Democratic National Convention

Candidate	Joe Biden	Blank ballots
Home state	Delaware	–
Delegate count	268	0
Popular vote	288,090	41,092
Percentage	80.7%	11.5%
County results
60–70%
70–80%
80–90%

New York City results by precinct Biden: 30–40%; 40–50%; 50–60%; 60–70%; 70–80%; 80–90%; 90–100%; Blank/Void: 30–40%; 40–50%; 50–60%; 60–70%; 70–80%; 80–90%; 90–100%; Williamson: 30–40%; 40–50%; 50–60%; 90–100%; Phillips: 40–50%; 50–60%; 60–70%; 90–100%; Other: 20–30% tie; 30–40% tie; 40–50% tie; 50% tie; No votes

The 2024 New York Democratic presidential primary was held on April 2, 2024, as part of the Democratic Party primaries for the 2024 presidential election, alongside contests in three other states. 268 delegates to the Democratic National Convention were allocated, with 39 additional unpledged delegates.

President Joe Biden won every county with little official opposition, but the amount of blank ballots, fueled by protest votes due to the Gaza war, reached more than 11% of the vote statewide, and more than 14% of the vote in New York City.

== Candidates ==
Incumbent President Joe Biden announced his bid for a second term on April 25, 2023. He faced a primary challenge from author, progressive activist, and 2020 presidential candidate Marianne Williamson, and former Congressman Dean Phillips. All three candidates filed to appear on the ballot by the January 19, 2024, filing deadline.

New York also officially tallied and reported the number of voters who left their ballots blank. New York did not give voters the option of voting "uncommitted" the way that some other states do, but voters were able to register protest votes by submitting a blank ballot.

== Endorsements ==
Joe Biden

Executive officials

- Hillary Clinton, U.S. Secretary of State (2009–2013); U.S. Senator from New York (2001–2009); First Lady of the United States (1993–2001); First Lady of Arkansas (1979–1981 and 1983–1992); Chancellor of Queen's University Belfast (2020–present); Democratic nominee for U.S. President in 2016
- James Comey, Director of the Federal Bureau of Investigation (2013–2017), United States Deputy Attorney General (2003–2005), United States Attorney for the Southern District of New York (2002–2003) (Independent)

US Senators

- Kirsten Gillibrand, New York (2009–present), U.S. Representative from NY-20 (2007–2009)
- Chuck Schumer, New York (1999–present), Senate Majority Leader (2021–present), Senate Minority Leader (2017–2021), U.S. Representative from NY-09 (1993–1999), NY-10 (1983–1993) and NY-16 (1981–1983)

US Representatives

- Jamaal Bowman, NY-16 (2021–present)
- Grace Meng, (Note: Biden-Harris Campaign National Advisory Board member) NY-06 (2013–present)
- Alexandria Ocasio-Cortez, NY-14 (2019–present)
- Pat Ryan, NY-18 (2023–present), NY-19 (2022–2023)
- Thomas Downey, NY-02 (1975–1993)
- Carolyn Maloney, NY-12 (2013–2023) and NY-14 (1993–2013)
- Tom Suozzi, NY-03 (2017–2023, 2024–present), candidate for Governor of New York in 2022

State officials

- Kathy Hochul, Governor of New York (2021–present); Lieutenant Governor of New York (2015–2021); U.S. Representative for NY-26 (2011–2013)
- Andrew Cuomo, Governor of New York (2011–2021); Attorney General of New York (2007–2011); United States Secretary of Housing and Urban Development (1997–2001)

Mayors

- Eric Adams, 110th mayor of New York City, New York (2022–present)

Individuals

- Jack Schlossberg, grandson of John F. Kennedy.

Organizations

- Democratic Party of New York
Dean Phillips (withdrawn)
- Andrew Yang, entrepreneur, candidate for president of the United States in 2020, candidate for mayor of New York City in 2021, founder of the Forward Party
Blank ballot

Organizations

- National organization, Buffalo, New York City and Syracuse chapters of the Democratic Socialists of America
- Working Families Party

State senators

- Jabari Brisport, state senator from the 18th district (2021–present)

State assemblymembers

- Zohran Mamdani, state assemblymember from the 36th district (2021–present)
- Marcela Mitaynes, state assemblymember from the 51st district (2021–present)
- Phara Souffrant Forrest, state assemblymember from the 57th district (2021–present)

Local officials

- Tiffany Cabán, New York City Councilmember from the 22nd district (2022–present), former candidate for Queens County District Attorney in 2019
- Shahana Hanif, New York City Councilmember from the 39th district (2022–present)
- Sandy Nurse, New York City Councilmember from the 37th district (2022–present)
- Alexa Avilés, New York City Councilmember from the 38th district (2022–present)

== Results ==
New York Democratic primary, April 2, 2024
Candidate	Votes	%	Delegates
Joe Biden (incumbent)	288,090	80.71	268
Marianne Williamson	15,567	4.36	0
Dean Phillips (withdrawn)	11,302	3.17	0
Blank ballots	41,092	11.51	—
Void ballots	904	0.25	—
Total	356,955	100%	268

=== Delegates elected by district ===
Voters directly elected congressional district-level delegates, while state-level (at-large) delegates would be allocated by the party via the presidential preference vote. Each campaign would normally submit a slate of district delegates to the New York State Board of Elections. However, only the Biden campaign submitted a slate by the nomination deadline. As a result, the following congressional district-level delegates were elected by default:

New York's 1st congressional district
Party	Candidate	Votes	%
Democratic	Tim Bishop (Biden)		
Democratic	Theresia Cooper (Biden)		
Democratic	Diane Costello (Biden)		
Democratic	Jose B. Dos Santos (Biden)		
Democratic	Tracey Edwards (Biden)		
Democratic	Catherine Kent (Biden)		
Democratic	Anthony Portesy (Biden)		
Total votes			

New York's 2nd congressional district
Party	Candidate	Votes	%
Democratic	DuWayne Gregory (Biden)		
Democratic	Monica Martinez (Biden)		
Democratic	Patrick Denis (Biden)		
Democratic	Leigh-Ann Barde (Biden)		
Democratic	Kenneth Colon (Biden)		
Total votes			

New York's 3rd congressional district
Party	Candidate	Votes	%
Democratic	James Scheuerman (Biden)		
Democratic	Veronica Lurvey (Biden)		
Democratic	Matthew Silverstein (Biden)		
Democratic	Kimberly Keiserman (Biden)		
Democratic	Delia Deriggi-Whitton (Biden)		
Democratic	Anthony Simon (Biden)		
Democratic	Carol Gresser (Biden)		
Total votes			

New York's 4th congressional district
Party	Candidate	Votes	%
Democratic	Thomas Garry (Biden)		
Democratic	Michaelle Solages (Biden)		
Democratic	Kevan Abrahams (Biden)		
Democratic	Laura Corcoran Doolin (Biden)		
Democratic	Waylyn Hobbs Jr. (Biden)		
Democratic	Evelyn DeJesus (Biden)		
Democratic	Edgar Campbell (Biden)		
Total votes			

New York's 5th congressional district
Party	Candidate	Votes	%
Democratic	Adrienne Adams (Biden)		
Democratic	Roslin Spigner (Biden)		
Democratic	Preston Baker (Biden)		
Democratic	Valerie West (Biden)		
Democratic	David Weprin (Biden)		
Democratic	Alicia Hyndman (Biden)		
Democratic	Patrick Jenkins (Biden)		
Total votes			

New York's 6th congressional district
Party	Candidate	Votes	%
Democratic	Glenn Magpantay (Biden)		
Democratic	Karen Koslowitz (Biden)		
Democratic	Hersh Parekh (Biden)		
Democratic	Sandra Mandell (Biden)		
Democratic	John Park (Biden)		
Total votes			

New York's 7th congressional district
Party	Candidate	Votes	%
Democratic	Darryl Towns (Biden)		
Democratic	Chelsea Connor (Biden)		
Democratic	Michael McGuire (Biden)		
Democratic	Rosa Cruz (Biden)		
Democratic	Johnathan Betancourt (Biden)		
Democratic	Nijema Rivera (Biden)		
Democratic	Johanna Carmona (Biden)		
Total votes			

New York's 8th congressional district
Party	Candidate	Votes	%
Democratic	Henry Butler (Biden)		
Democratic	Nikki Lucas (Biden)		
Democratic	Ademola Oyefoso (Biden)		
Democratic	Darlene Mealy (Biden)		
Democratic	Jabaran Akram (Biden)		
Democratic	Roxanne Persaud (Biden)		
Democratic	Yamil Speight-Miller (Biden)		
Total votes			

New York's 9th congressional district
Party	Candidate	Votes	%
Democratic	Una Clarke (Biden)		
Democratic	Zellnor Myrie (Biden)		
Democratic	Jahmila Edwards (Biden)		
Democratic	Brian Cunningham (Biden)		
Democratic	Rona Taylor (Biden)		
Democratic	Edu Hermelyn (Biden)		
Democratic	Sarana Purcell (Biden)		
Democratic	Pinchas Ringel (Biden)		
Total votes			

New York's 10th congressional district
Party	Candidate	Votes	%
Democratic	Karen Persichilli Keogh (Biden)		
Democratic	Simcha Eichenstein (Biden)		
Democratic	Grace Lee (Biden)		
Democratic	Steve Cohn (Biden)		
Democratic	Chung Seto (Biden)		
Democratic	Robert Carroll (Biden)		
Democratic	Jo Anne Simon (Biden)		
Democratic	Jeffrey Lewis (Biden)		
Democratic	Ilyssa Robin Meyer (Biden)		
Democratic	Carlos Calzadilla (Biden)		
Total votes			

New York's 11th congressional district
Party	Candidate	Votes	%
Democratic	Edwina Frances Martin (Biden)		
Democratic	Michael Mulgrew (Biden)		
Democratic	Nancy D. Myers (Biden)		
Democratic	Selina Grey (Biden)		
Democratic	Charles Fall (Biden)		
Total votes			

New York's 12th congressional district
Party	Candidate	Votes	%
Democratic	Keith Powers (Biden)		
Democratic	Gale Brewer (Biden)		
Democratic	Erik Bottcher (Biden)		
Democratic	Linda Rosenthal (Biden)		
Democratic	Tony Simone (Biden)		
Democratic	Carlina Rivera (Biden)		
Democratic	Jonathan Henes (Biden)		
Democratic	Sarah Min (Biden)		
Democratic	Alex Bores (Biden)		
Democratic	Anastasia Somoza (Biden)		
Democratic	Robert M. Gottheim (Biden)		
Total votes			

New York's 13th congressional district
Party	Candidate	Votes	%
Democratic	Elsie Encarnacion (Biden)		
Democratic	Keith Wright (Biden)		
Democratic	Diana Ayala (Biden)		
Democratic	George Alvarez (Biden)		
Democratic	Gloria Middleton (Biden)		
Democratic	Manny De Los Santos (Biden)		
Democratic	Pierina Sanchez (Biden)		
Democratic	Monjur Choudhury (Biden)		
Total votes			

New York's 14th congressional district
Party	Candidate	Votes	%
Democratic	Amanda Farias (Biden)		
Democratic	Michael Benedetto (Biden)		
Democratic	AnneMarie Anzalone (Biden)		
Democratic	Antonio Alfonso Jr. (Biden)		
Democratic	Leah Richardson (Biden)		
Democratic	Andres Y. Vargas (Biden)		
Total votes			

New York's 15th congressional district
Party	Candidate	Votes	%
Democratic	Yudelka Tapia (Biden)		
Democratic	Kevin Riley (Biden)		
Democratic	Virginia Krompinger (Biden)		
Democratic	Rafael Salamanca (Biden)		
Democratic	Odetty Tineo (Biden)		
Total votes			

New York's 16th congressional district
Party	Candidate	Votes	%
Democratic	Shawyn Patterson-Howard (Biden)		
Democratic	Jamaal Bailey (Biden)		
Democratic	Suzanne Berger (Biden)		
Democratic	George Latimer (Biden)		
Democratic	Florence McCue (Biden)		
Democratic	Jason Laidley (Biden)		
Democratic	Edgar Santana III (Biden)		
Democratic	Shannon Powell (Biden)		
Total votes			

New York's 17th congressional district
Party	Candidate	Votes	%
Democratic	Nicole Doliner (Biden)		
Democratic	Vedat Gashi (Biden)		
Democratic	Schleney Vital (Biden)		
Democratic	Lauren Leader (Biden)		
Democratic	Mondaire Jones (Biden)		
Democratic	Beth Davidson (Biden)		
Democratic	Jennifer Colamonico (Biden)		
Democratic	Mario Cilento (Biden)		
Total votes			

New York's 18th congressional district
Party	Candidate	Votes	%
Democratic	Zachary Constantine (Biden)		
Democratic	Julie Shiroishi (Biden)		
Democratic	Christopher Drago (Biden)		
Democratic	Christine Stage (Biden)		
Democratic	Barbara Graves-Poller (Biden)		
Democratic	Brandon Holdridge (Biden)		
Democratic	Frank L. Cardinale (Biden)		
Total votes			

New York's 19th congressional district
Party	Candidate	Votes	%
Democratic	Anne Hart (Biden)		
Democratic	Shawna Black (Biden)		
Democratic	Daniel J. Torres (Biden)		
Democratic	Patricia Giltner (Biden)		
Democratic	Florence McCue (Biden)		
Democratic	Timothy Perfetti (Biden)		
Democratic	Max Della Pia (Biden)		
Democratic	Wanda Hayek (Biden)		
Total votes			

New York's 20th congressional district
Party	Candidate	Votes	%
Democratic	Patricia Reilly (Biden)		
Democratic	Jacob M. Crawford (Biden)		
Democratic	Dorcey Applyrs (Biden)		
Democratic	Todd Kerner (Biden)		
Democratic	Corey L. Ellis (Biden)		
Democratic	Daniel McCoy (Biden)		
Democratic	Melinda Person (Biden)		
Democratic	Caroline B. McGraw (Biden)		
Total votes			

New York's 21st congressional district
Party	Candidate	Votes	%
Democratic	Michael Monescalchi (Biden)		
Democratic	Jason Clark (Biden)		
Democratic	Sara Idleman (Biden)		
Democratic	Michael J. Zagrobelny (Biden)		
Democratic	Lynne Boecher (Biden)		
Total votes			

New York's 22nd congressional district
Party	Candidate	Votes	%
Democratic	Frank Deriso (Biden)		
Democratic	Diane Dwire (Biden)		
Democratic	Mitchell G. Ford (Biden)		
Democratic	Margaret Anne Chase (Biden)		
Democratic	James Monto III (Biden)		
Democratic	Rita Paniagua (Biden)		
Total votes			

New York's 23rd congressional district
Party	Candidate	Votes	%
Democratic	Hilda Lando (Biden)		
Democratic	Terrence Melvin (Biden)		
Democratic	Marjorie Lawlor (Biden)		
Democratic	Shawn D. Hogan (Biden)		
Democratic	Jessica Schuster (Biden)		
Democratic	Terrence MacKinnon (Biden)		
Total votes			

New York's 24th congressional district
Party	Candidate	Votes	%
Democratic	Dia Carabajal (Biden)		
Democratic	Daniel Farfaglia (Biden)		
Democratic	Loria Longhany (Biden)		
Democratic	John F. Hurley (Biden)		
Total votes			

New York's 25th congressional district
Party	Candidate	Votes	%
Democratic	Shelly Clements (Biden)		
Democratic	Anthony Plonczynski-Figueroa (Biden)		
Democratic	Yversha Roman (Biden)		
Democratic	Jamie Romeo (Biden)		
Democratic	Adam Bello (Biden)		
Democratic	Samra Brouk (Biden)		
Democratic	Stephen Gregory Devay (Biden)		
Democratic	Shannon Powell (Biden)		
Total votes			

New York's 26th congressional district
Party	Candidate	Votes	%
Democratic	Leah M. Halton-Pope (Biden)		
Democratic	Mark Poloncarz (Biden)		
Democratic	Jeremy Zellner (Biden)		
Democratic	April McCants-Baskin (Biden)		
Democratic	Bonnie Kane-Lockwood (Biden)		
Democratic	Howard J. Johnson Jr. (Biden)		
Democratic	Mitchell P. Nowakowski (Biden)		
Democratic	Melissa Bochenski (Biden)		
Total votes			

== See also ==
- 2024 New York Republican presidential primary
- 2024 Democratic Party presidential primaries
- 2024 United States presidential election
- 2024 United States presidential election in New York
- 2024 United States elections
