= New York City Council Progressive Caucus =

Caucus within the New York City Council

- Co-Chairs: Sandy Nurse; Tiffany Cabán
- Co-Vice Chairs: Alexa Avilés; Kayla Santosuosso
- Founded: 2009; 17 years ago
- Ideology: Progressivism
- Political position: Left-wing
- National affiliation: Democratic Party
- Seats in the New York City Council Democratic Caucus: 24 / 44
- Seats in the New York City Council: 24 / 51

Website
- Council website Caucus website

The Progressive Caucus of the New York City Council is a bloc of progressive New York City Council members that was formed in 2009. It has 24 members, which includes nearly half of the Council's 51 members. It is co-chaired by Sandy Nurse (D-Brooklyn) and Tiffany Cabán (D-Queens). Alexa Avilés (D-Brooklyn) and Kayla Santosuosso (D-Brooklyn) are Vice Chairs.

== Statement of principles ==
The Progressive Caucus's stated objective is to create a "more just and equal New York City, combating all forms of discrimination, and advancing policies that offer genuine opportunities to all New Yorkers, especially those who have been left out of our society's prosperity." The Caucus's stated principles prioritize:

- a "fair budget",
- a progressive economic policy,
- "safe, decent, affordable housing",
- "high-quality public education",
- "a more sustainable and environmentally just city",
- "strong, vibrant, diverse neighborhoods",
- a criminal justice system focused on "prevention, alternatives-to-incarceration, partnership with communities, and police accountability",
- "full civil rights for all New Yorkers", and
- a restoration of "confidence and participation of government" and "strengthening the practice of local democracy".

== Legislative agenda ==
The Progressive Caucus has prioritized 13 bills in three categories for the 2026-2029 legislative session. They are:

1. A more affordable city:
  1. the "SAFER Homes Act" to deal with "the most financially and physically distressed buildings"
  2. the "Community Opportunity to Purchase Act" for certain real estate
  3. "Establishing a Baby Opportunity Fund" to start a pilot program to distribute $2,000 each into savings accounts for eligible children.
2. Worker justice and consumer protection:
  1. "Trip-Level Data Reporting" to mandate that third-party delivery companies share certain data with the city
  2. "Delivery Protection Act" to mandate labor conditions for delivery workers
  3. "Self-Service Checkout Regulation"
3. Safer city and better quality of life:
  1. "Indirect Source Rule" to capture more pollution emissions
  2. "Capping Renewable Energy Credits" to reduce speculation in credits
  3. "Ban the Scan" to regulate the use of biometric recognition technology
  4. "The CURB Act" to prohibit the NYPD from using its Strategic Response Group or kettling, tear gas, or similar tactics on peaceful protests (similar to a bill on the 2023 agenda)
  5. "Department of Community Safety" to "promote community safety and non-police emergency response"
  6. "Abolish GANGS Database"
  7. "Lighting Underneath Elevated Trains" to assess streets and sidewalks that currently may be shaded by elevated tracks, and install needed lighting

== History ==
The Progressive Caucus was formed in 2009 order to promote policies focused on building "a more just and equal New York City." The Caucus initially consisted of 12 members (nearly 25% of the 51-member New York City Council), co-chaired by Brad Lander (D-Brooklyn) and Melissa Mark-Viverito (D-Manhattan/Bronx).

The caucus grew to 35 members following the 2021 city council elections. This enabled them to exercise an increased level of oversight regarding Mayor Adams's administration, which had an adversarial relationship to more progressive Council members.

The caucus then narrowed to 20 members in February 2023, following new bylaws requiring members to sign on to their Statement of Principles. As of 2026, the caucus had grown to 24 members.

In July 2016, the caucus encouraged New York Governor Andrew Cuomo to sign an anti-Airbnb bill into law. This bill, the first of its kind as it pertained to regulation of Airbnb, was signed into law in the state of New York on October 21, 2016. Also, in November 2016, the caucus endorsed Minnesota Congressman Keith Ellison for chairman of the Democratic National Committee.

Its 2018 agenda included the Right to Know Act, which mandated that NYPD officers identify themselves to non-officers under certain circumstances.

The caucus launched the Progressive Caucus Alliance as a campaign arm for the group ahead of the 2017 election, endorsing a slate of incumbent members and ideologically aligned challengers. The group was inactive until 2025, when it endorsed a slate of incumbent members for the 2025 election.

In 2023, the caucus prioritized 7 issue areas and related bills:

1. Banning Solitary Confinement
2. Prohibiting housing discrimination on the basis of arrest record or criminal history
3. The "Public Bank Package"
4. Police Transparency
5. The "Zero Waste Package"
6. Creating Permanently Affordable Housing
7. The Earned Safe and Sick Time Act Expansion for Gig Workers

== Current membership ==
Membership as of 2026 includes the following members:

District	Member	Borough	Party	Assumed office	Notes
1	Christopher Marte	Manhattan	Dem	2022	
2	Harvey Epstein	Manhattan	Dem	2025	
6	Gale Brewer	Manhattan	Dem	2022	
8	Elsie Encarnacion	Manhattan	Dem	2026	
10	Carmen De La Rosa	Manhattan	Dem	2022	
13	Shirley Aldebol	Bronx	Dem	2026	
14	Pierina Sanchez	Bronx	Dem	2022	
16	Althea Stevens	Bronx	Dem	2022	
17	Justin Sanchez	Bronx	Dem	2026	
18	Amanda Farías	Bronx	Dem	2022	Council Majority Leader (2022–present)
21	Shanel Thomas-Henry	Queens	Dem	2026	
22	Tiffany Cabán	Queens	Dem	2022	Co-chair
25	Shekar Krishnan	Queens	Dem	2022	
26	Julie Won	Queens	Dem	2022	
33	Lincoln Restler	Brooklyn	Dem	2022	
34	Jennifer Gutiérrez	Brooklyn	Dem	2022	
35	Crystal Hudson	Brooklyn	Dem	2022	
36	Chi Ossé	Brooklyn	Dem	2022	
37	Sandy Nurse	Brooklyn	Dem	2022	Co-chair
38	Alexa Avilés	Brooklyn	Dem	2022	Co-Vice Chair
39	Shahana Hanif	Brooklyn	Dem	2022	Co-chair
40	Rita Joseph	Brooklyn	Dem	2022	
47	Kayla Santosuosso	Brooklyn	Dem	2026	

== Former membership ==
=== 2022–2025 ===
Membership during the 2022–2025 term included the following members:

- Christopher Marte (D-1-Manhattan)
- Carlina Rivera (D-2-Manhattan)
- Carmen De La Rosa (D-10-Manhattan), Vice co-chair
- Pierina Sanchez (D-14-Bronx)
- Althea Stevens (D-16-Bronx)
- Amanda Farías (D-18-Bronx), Council Majority Leader
- Tiffany Cabán (D-22-Queens)
- Shekar Krishnan (D-25-Queens)
- Julie Won (D-26-Queens)
- Nantasha Williams (D-27-Queens)
- Adrienne Adams (D-28-Queens), Council Speaker, Ex Officio
- Lincoln Restler (D-33-Brooklyn), Co-chair
- Jennifer Gutiérrez (D-34-Brooklyn/Queens), Vice co-chair
- Crystal Hudson (D-35-Brooklyn)
- Chi Ossé (D-36-Brooklyn)
- Sandy Nurse (D-37-Brooklyn)
- Alexa Aviles (D-38-Brooklyn)
- Shahana Hanif (D-39-Brooklyn), Co-chair
- Rita Joseph (D-40-Brooklyn)
- Charles Barron (D-42-Brooklyn)

=== 2018–2021 ===
Membership during the 2018-2021 term included the following members:

- Margaret Chin (D-1-Manhattan)
- Carlina Rivera (D-2-Manhattan)
- Keith Powers (D-4-Manhattan), Vice-chair
- Ben Kallos (D-5-Manhattan), Co-chair
- Helen Rosenthal (D-6-Manhattan)
- Mark Levine (D-7-Manhattan)
- Diana Ayala (D-8-Bronx/Manhattan), Co-chair
- Bill Perkins (D-9-Manhattan)
- Ydanis Rodriguez (D-10-Manhattan)
- Andrew Cohen (D-11-Bronx)
- Ritchie Torres (D-15-Bronx)
- Jimmy Van Bramer (D-26-Queens)
- I. Daneek Miller (D-27-Queens)
- Adrienne Adams (D-28-Queens), Council Speaker
- Donovan Richards (D-31-Queens)
- Steve Levin (D-33-Brooklyn)
- Antonio Reynoso (D-34-Brooklyn/Queens)
- Carlos Menchaca (D-38-Brooklyn), Vice-chair
- Brad Lander (D-39-Brooklyn)
- Alicka Ampry-Samuel (D-41-Brooklyn)
- Justin Brannan (D-43-Brooklyn)
- Jumaane D. Williams (D-45-Brooklyn)
- Debi Rose (D-49-Staten Island)
