= Shahana Hanif =

American politician (born 1991)

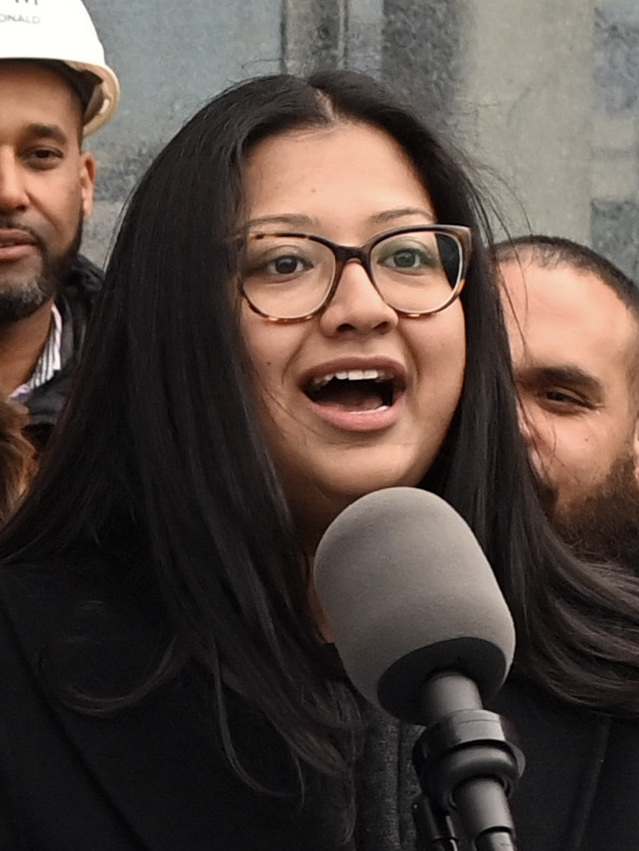

Member of the New York City Council from the 39th district
- Incumbent
- Assumed office January 1, 2022
- Preceded by: Brad Lander
- Parliamentary group: New York City Socialists in Office

Personal details
- Born: February 5, 1991 (age 35) Brooklyn, New York, U.S.
- Party: Democratic
- Other political affiliations: Democratic Socialists of America
- Education: Brooklyn College (BA)
- Website: Official website Campaign website

Shahana K. Hanif (born February 5, 1991) is an American politician, activist, and community organizer. Since 2022, she has represented the New York City Council's 39th district which includes the Brooklyn neighborhoods of Park Slope, Windsor Terrace, Carroll Gardens, Cobble Hill and Kensington.

Hanif became politically active after a lupus diagnosis as a teenager exposed her to problems with the healthcare system and began her career as a community organizer with the Committee Against Anti-Asian Violence. She worked with City Councilman Brad Lander starting in 2017, and ran to fill his seat in 2021. She won the election, becoming the first Muslim woman and first Bangladeshi American on City Council. She co-chairs the council's Progressive Caucus and is associated with the Democratic Socialists of America.

== Early life and education ==
Hanif was born in 1991 in Brooklyn to immigrant parents from Bangladesh. She was raised in Kensington’s Bangladeshi community and graduated from Bishop Kearney High School. At age 17, Hanif was diagnosed with lupus, an incurable and potentially fatal autoimmune disease. She has cited her experience with the chronic illness, which forced her to navigate the healthcare system for years despite having inadequate health insurance, as her first window into disability justice and community organizing.

She earned a bachelor's degree in 2015 in women's and gender studies from Brooklyn College. Hanif participated in the school's Scholars Program and earned a Marge Magner Stipend Award during the summer of 2015. While attending Brooklyn College, Hanif became involved in intersectional activism and community organizing. She was a member of two campus organizations: Committee Against Anti-Asian Violence and Naree Shongothok: Bangladeshi Women Organizing for Social Change.

== Career ==
=== Community organizing ===
Following college, Hanif spent time in Dhaka, Bangladesh, where she worked with several women centered organizations. Hanif has said witnessing gender-based inequalities within Brooklyn's Bangladeshi Muslim community inspired her to become a community organizer. She began her career working as a community organizer with the Committee Against Anti-Asian Violence (CAAAV) Organizing Asian Communities, where she spent two years building tenant power with Bangladeshi and other Asian NYCHA residents.

=== New York City Council ===
==== 2021 election ====
Hanif began working for Councilman Brad Lander in 2017, first as his liaison to the Bangladeshi community and eventually as his director of organizing and community engagement. During her time working for Lander, Hanif helped a Bangladeshi woman escape a forced marriage, which she cited as an important factor in her eventual decision to run for the New York City Council herself. In late 2019, with her boss Lander facing term limits, Hanif announced her intention to run for the City Council's 39th district in 2021. The district, which had previously been represented by Mayor Bill de Blasio and which was soon to promote Lander to the City Comptroller's office, was described as a "political launching pad" by Gotham Gazette.

Hanif faced six other candidates in the June 2021 Democratic primary, most notable among them activist Brandon West. Hanif and West both ran on similar left-wing policy platforms, but West received the support of the Democratic Socialists of America and other socialist elected officials, while Hanif was backed by the Working Families Party and other more traditional progressive organizations; Congresswoman Alexandria Ocasio-Cortez, meanwhile, issued an unusual dual endorsement of both candidates.

On election night, Hanif held a 32-23% advantage over West. When absentee ballots and ranked-choice votes were counted two weeks later, Hanif emerged with a 57-43% lead, and declared victory on July 3. She faced minimal opposition in the November general election, and handily won the race, making her the first Muslim woman and the first Bangladeshi American elected to the New York City Council and the first woman to represent the 39th district. The final tally showed that she had 89% of the vote.

==== Tenure ====
As of 2024, Hanif was chair of the New York City Council Progressive Caucus and a member of the Democratic Socialists of America. As of December 2024, she cosponsored more than 800 bills, introduced 36, and passed 11 as lead sponsor. Among the bills she passed are the NYC Abortion Rights Act, Universal Curbside Composting, and the Workers Bill of Rights.

==== 2025 campaign ====
In the 2025 New York City Democratic Primary Election, Hanif was challenged by Maya Kornberg, a researcher at New York University's Brennan Center for Justice. Hanif was endorsed by Rep. Alexandria Ocasio-Cortez, Brad Lander and Zohran Mamdani. She gained substantial financial resources for her re-election campaign following her votes to encourage development in her district, securing support from housing development PACs Abundant New York and People for Public Space, both of which pointed to her support of "City of Yes" plans to expand development to increase housing. On the night of the primary, with more than 90% of votes counted, Hanif led with nearly 70% of the vote.

== Positions and issues ==
=== Housing and development ===
Hanif has pressed developers for affordable housing. In 2022, Hanif pushed to reduce the number of housing units that could be built on a rezoned block in Gowanus, Brooklyn. The original plan proposed to allow the construction of buildings that were 95 feet and nine stories, but after Hanif's intervention, the lot only allowed for 55 feet and five stories. The lower height limit was likely to reduce the number of affordable housing units in the buildings, in part because developers are required to include affordable units when they exceed a certain size.

Hanif faced neighborhood pressure in 2024 around a residential rezoning proposed for an industrial site, Arrow Linen Supply Company, in her district. The project was strongly opposed by some residents who were concerned that the project would be out of character for the neighborhood and lead to higher rents. At one hearing, 35 testified against the proposal and 33 testified for it, and many residents testifying discussed the issue of affordability. One community group, Housing Not Highrises, demanded a height limit of nine stories. Hanif ultimately supported the project after brokering a deal to reduce its size from 13 to 10 stories and increase the amount of affordable housing from 25% to 40%.

Hanif voted for the "City of Yes" housing plan in 2024 which was part of a broader shift by progressive elected officials towards supporting construction in New York City.

=== Crime and public safety ===
Following the 2022 killing of a dog in Prospect Park by a homeless man, the woman who was attacked and other constituents approached Hanif for a public safety response, but said they thought Hanif was prioritizing the attacker's mental health. A staff member in Hanif's office told a reporter that involving the police would only escalate the situation and create a greater threat to public safety. Her inaction on the issue shocked the progressive former city councilman David Yassky, who supported her opponent in 2025. When challenged on public safety during the 2025 Democratic primary campaign on her outspoken criticisms of the New York Police Department, Hanif stood by the position, comparing the NYPD budget with other important city institutions.

In 2023, Hanif led a movement by the Progressive Caucus of the NYC Council to reduce funding for the NYPD. Hanif requested that all members of the caucus sign a statement of principles that included a commitment to "do everything we can to reduce the size and scope of the NYPD and the Department of Correction." As a result of the action, 15 members left the caucus.

=== Israel and Palestine ===
Hanif is an outspoken supporter of the Palestinian cause and critic of Israel, a stance that has motivated efforts to replace her in 2025. In 2021 she liked and retweeted a post on X that read "Globalize the Intifada." She later deleted the post, saying, "That phrase has been deleted, and I recognize that it is a phrase that is antagonistic, discriminatory and hurtful to many Jewish people, and so I have learned, and I will continue to learn."

In October 2023, she was arrested alongside Brooklyn State Senator Jabari Brisport at a rally in Manhattan organized by Within Our Lifetime and the Democratic Socialists of America where she called for an immediate ceasefire in Gaza. She has called Israel's actions following the October 7 attacks a genocide. In the spring of 2024 she voiced support for student protesters at Columbia University calling for divestment from Israel and visiting the encampment.

She has been criticized for not responding to rising acts of antisemitism in her district. In 2023, Hanif joined with five other Council members to vote against a resolution declaring April 29 as "End Jew Hatred" day. The measure was ultimately passed.

During the 2024 presidential primary, Hanif endorsed the Leave It Blank campaign by a coalition of progressive and pro-Palestine activists encouraging voters to submit blank ballots in protest of Joe Biden's military support for Israel's invasion of Gaza. The campaign was supported by the Working Families Party and the New York City chapter of the Democratic Socialists of America as well as New York state Sen. Jabari Brisport, Assembly Members Zohran Mamdani and Marcela Mitaynes, and City Council Member Tiffany Cabán.

== Electoral history ==
=== 2025 ===
2025 New York City Council Democratic primary, District 39
Party	Candidate	Votes	%
Democratic	Shahana Hanif (incumbent)	32,553	70.0
Democratic	Maya Kornberg	12,066	25.9
Democratic	Nickie Kane	1,646	3.5
Write-in		252	0.5
Total votes		46,517	100.0

2025 New York City Council election, District 39
Party	Candidate	Votes	%
Democratic	Shahana Hanif	39,911	60.5
Working Families	Shahana Hanif	16,715	25.3
Total	Shahana Hanif (incumbent)	56,626	85.9
Conservative	Brett E. Wynkoop	5,761	8.7
Libertarian	Matthew I. Morgan	1,834	2.8
Voters First	Nickie Kane	1,294	2.0
Write-in		429	0.7
Total votes		65,944	100.0
Democratic hold			

=== 2023 ===
2023 New York City Council election, District 39
Party	Candidate	Votes	%
Democratic	Shahana Hanif	12,108	57.7
Working Families	Shahana Hanif	5,792	27.6
Total	Shahana Hanif (incumbent)	17,900	85.3
Republican	Arkadiusz T. Tomaszewski	2,173	10.4
Conservative	Arkadiusz T. Tomaszewski (Note: Shared with "Medical Freedom" ballot line.)	494	2.4
Total	Arkadiusz T. Tomaszewski	2,667	12.7
Write-in		417	2.0
Total votes		20,984	100.0
Democratic hold			

=== 2021 ===
2021 New York City Council Democratic primary, District 39
Party	Candidate	Maximum round	Maximum votes	Share in maximum round	Maximum votes First round votes Transfer votes
Democratic	Shahana Hanif	6	15,980	57.0%	
Democratic	Brandon West	6	12,058	43.0%	
Democratic	Justin M. Krebs	5	8,913	27.6%	
Democratic	Douglas M. Schneider	4	5,854	17.1%	
Democratic	Briget Rein	3	2,634	7.4%	
Democratic	Jessica Simmons	3	1,634	4.6%	
Democratic	Mamnun M. Haq	2	1,460	4.1%	
Write-In		1	90	0.2%	

2021 New York City Council election, District 39
Party	Candidate	Votes	%
Democratic	Shahana Hanif	25,306	74.2
Working Families	Shahana Hanif	5,090	14.9
Total	Shahana Hanif	30,396	89.1
Conservative	Brett E. Wynkoop	2,657	7.8
Libertarian	Matthew I. Morgan	939	2.8
Write-in		134	0.4
Total votes		34,126	100.0
Democratic hold			
