= Brad Lander =

American politician (born 1969)

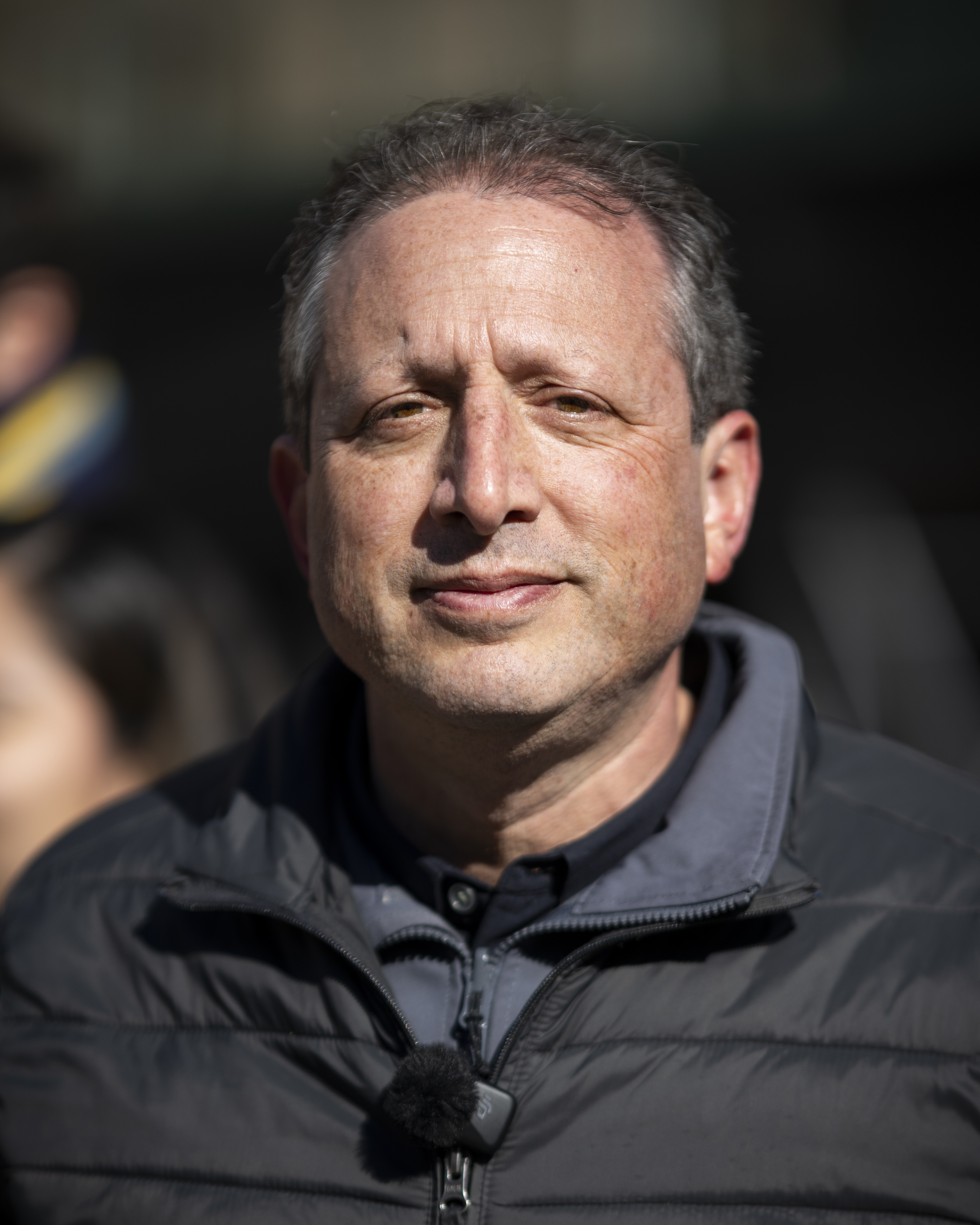
- Lander in 2026

Member-elect of the U.S. House of Representatives from New York's 10th district
- Assuming office January 3, 2027
- Succeeding: Dan Goldman

45th Comptroller of New York City
- In office January 1, 2022 – December 31, 2025
- Mayor: Eric Adams
- Preceded by: Scott Stringer
- Succeeded by: Mark Levine

Member of the New York City Council from the 39th district
- In office January 1, 2010 – December 31, 2021
- Preceded by: Bill de Blasio
- Succeeded by: Shahana Hanif

Personal details
- Born: Bradford Scott Lander; July 8, 1969 (age 57) St. Louis, Missouri, U.S.
- Party: Democratic
- Other political affiliations: Working Families (Note: Lander has been elected on both the Democratic and Working Families ballot lines through New York's system of electoral fusion.); Democratic Socialists of America (until November 2023) (Note: Democratic Socialists of America (DSA) is not a registered political party. Instead, it is a political organization for those with democratic socialist ideologies. Lander was a member of the New York City DSA chapter until the October 7 attacks.)
- Spouse: Meg Barnette (m. 1996)
- Children: 2
- Education: University of Chicago (BA); University College London (MSc); Pratt Institute (MS)
- Website: Campaign website

Bradford Scott Lander (born July 8, 1969) is an American politician and urban planner who is the U.S. representative-elect for New York's 10th congressional district. A progressive Democrat, he previously served as New York City comptroller from 2022 until 2025, and before that served on the New York City Council from 2010 to 2021, representing the 39th district, which is partly based in Brooklyn.

Born in suburban St. Louis, Lander has pursued his political career in New York City since the 1990s, where he has become a mainstay in progressive activism. In 2009, Lander was elected to the city council, serving until his election as comptroller in 2021. In 2025, Lander unsuccessfully ran for New York City mayor, placing third in the Democratic primary.

== Early life and education ==
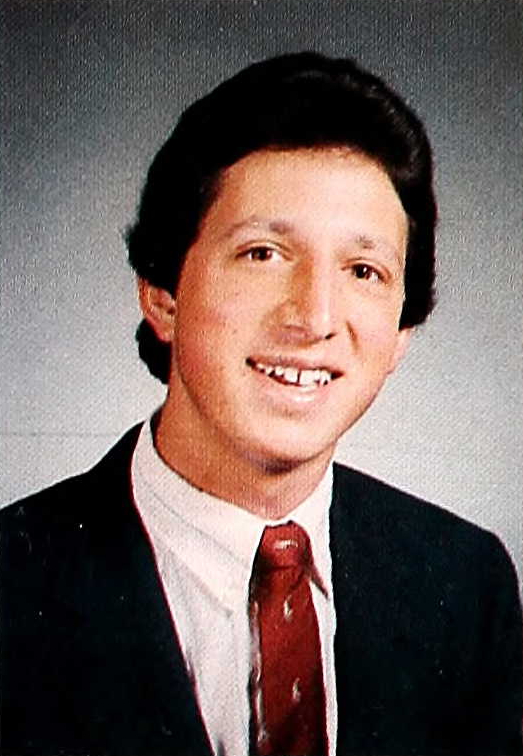
Lander in the Parkway North High School yearbook, 1987

Brad Lander is the son of Carole Lander and David Lander, a bankruptcy attorney. He grew up in Creve Coeur, a suburb of St. Louis, Missouri, in a Reform Jewish family, and graduated from Parkway North High School in 1987.

Lander developed an early interest in political issues, and was strongly influenced by the example set by the civil rights and anti-war leaders Reverend Martin Luther King Jr. and Rabbi Abraham Joshua Heschel. As a teenager he helped organize a march in Washington, D.C. in support of Jews in the Soviet Union who were not allowed to emigrate.

Lander earned a bachelor's degree from the University of Chicago in 1991, where he received a Harry S. Truman Scholarship and joined the Democratic Socialists of America (DSA). He earned a master's degree in anthropology from University College London on a Marshall Scholarship, followed by a master's degree in urban planning from the Pratt Institute in New York.

== Early career ==
From 1993 to 2003, Lander was the executive director of the Fifth Avenue Committee (FAC), a Park Slope nonprofit organization that develops and manages affordable housing.

From 2003 to 2009, Lander was a director of the university-based Pratt Center for Community Development. In that position, he was a critic of the Bloomberg administration's development policies. He has also been a critic of the Atlantic Yards project. Lander served on a mayoral taskforce that recommended reforms to the 421-a tax exemption for luxury housing and required that new development in certain areas of the city set aside affordable housing units. He co-led the completion of the One City One Future platform, a progressive vision for economic development in New York City. He stepped down as head of the organization in 2009 to seek a seat on the New York City Council. Lander teaches as an adjunct professor at Brooklyn Law School.

== New York City Council ==
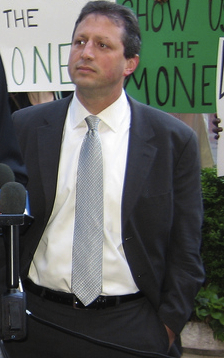
Lander in 2010

Lander represented the 39th district on the New York City Council from 2009 until 2021, when term limits prevented him from running again. He co-founded the Progressive Caucus in the New York City Council. In his first term, Lander co-chaired the caucus with Speaker Melissa Mark-Viverito.

In 2009, Lander ran to represent the 39th district on the New York City Council, including the Brooklyn neighborhoods of Boerum Hill, Borough Park, Brooklyn Heights, Carroll Gardens, Cobble Hill, Flatbush, Gowanus, Green-Wood Cemetery, Kensington, Park Slope, Prospect Heights, Prospect Lefferts Gardens, Red Hook, Prospect Park, South Slope, Sunset Park, and Windsor Terrace. He won the Democratic primary on September 15, 2009, with 41% of the vote in a field of five and appeared on the general election ballot on the Democratic Party and Working Families Party lines. On November 4, 2009, he won with 70% of the vote. After his first four-year term, Lander was reelected on the Democratic and Working Families Parties' lines in 2013.

In June 2018 he was arrested for blocking traffic, disorderly conduct, and failing to disperse at a protest outside the Brooklyn office of State Senator Marty Golden. In 2019, Lander admitted to an ethics violation for using his official government position to solicit monetary donations for a progressive nonprofit he helped create and of which he was chairman. In his second term on the council, he served as the deputy leader for policy.

== New York City comptroller ==
=== 2021 election ===
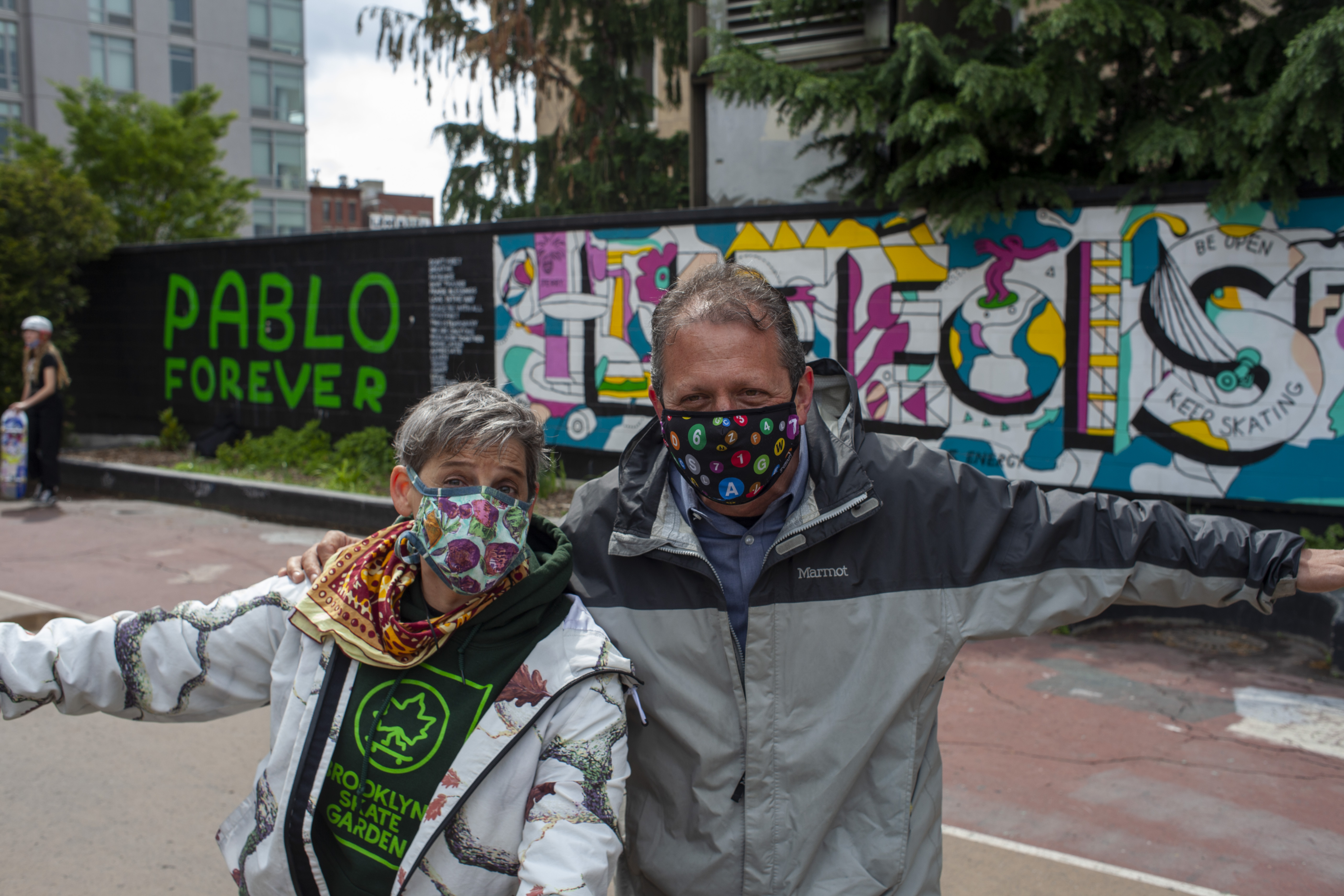
Brad Lander and skateboarding advocate Loren Michelle pose in front of the Pablo Forever Mural at Washington Skatepark in Park Slope on May 8, 2021.

Facing term limits for his council seat after his third term, Lander announced his candidacy for the 2021 New York City Comptroller election, an open race as the incumbent, Scott Stringer, also faced term limits. He said that if elected he would expand the office to conduct equity audits to reduce disparities across race, gender, and ethnicity, including in how city agencies hire contractors. He said he would also use the office as an organizing vehicle for advocates, and produce audits, draft reports, and release data in partnership with organizers running campaigns centered on racial, social, and economic justice. Lander was endorsed by the Working Families Party, unions including Communications Workers of America District 1, and various Democratic clubs and community organizations. He was endorsed by progressive elected officials including Senator Elizabeth Warren, Public Advocate Jumaane Williams, Congresswoman Nydia Velázquez, Congresswoman Alexandria Ocasio-Cortez, and members of the New York City Council and New York State legislature.

Lander won the Democratic primary against State Senator Brian Benjamin, entrepreneur and former US Marine Zach Iscol, New York State Senator Kevin Parker, former Public Advocate and former New York City Council Speaker Corey Johnson, and New York State Assemblymember David Weprin, among others, and won the general election over Republican nominee Daby Carreras.

=== Tenure ===
In 2022, Lander called for ending 421a, a program that provided tax incentives for developers of market-rate apartments who also added below-market rentals. Lander and other critics described it as a subsidy for developers in exchange for few low-income units, while supporters argued that it encouraged housing construction and alleviated the housing shortage in New York.

In March 2022, Lander called on Mayor Eric Adams to abandon his effort to shift retired municipal workers onto a new Medicare program and comply with a court order declaring the move illegal. He subsequently refused to register the city's contract with Aetna, citing pending legislation that called the program's legality into question, but Adams overrode his decision and registered the contract.

Lander developed a reputation as a foil to Adams, often criticizing or using the comptroller's oversight role to challenge his policies. In 2023, Politico called Lander Adams's "archrival". In February 2025, Lander released a public letter to Adams threatening to convene a meeting of the Inability Committee if Adams did not "develop and present a detailed contingency plan outlining how you intend to manage the City of New York."

Lander is a member of the Vote Blue Coalition, a progressive group and federal PAC created to support Democrats in New York, New Jersey, and Pennsylvania through voter outreach and mobilization efforts.

In June 2025, as Donald Trump increased deportations of immigrants, Lander began accompanying defendants to immigration hearings. On June 17, Lander was arrested and handcuffed by masked Immigration and Customs Enforcement (ICE) officials at an immigration court while linking arms with a person ICE was trying to detain. The reason given for the arrest was "assaulting law enforcement and impeding a federal officer", according to Department of Homeland Security spokeswoman Tricia McLaughlin. Lander was released and said he "certainly did not" assault an officer. The arrest was condemned by Democratic politicians from the state, including New York State Governor Kathy Hochul, NYS Attorney General Letitia James, and U.S. Representative Alexandria Ocasio-Cortez.

Lander was arrested by DHS again on September 18, along with several New York state legislators while trying to access ICE detention cells and protest the detentions at the Jacob K. Javits Federal Building. In a two-day bench trial in June 2026, Lander was found not guilty of obstructing officers' access to an elevator.

In 2025, advocacy organization New York Communities for Change (NYCC) representatives voiced frustration with Lander and the New York City Comptroller's Office in regard to helping keep solvent three pension funds for retirees of various New York City employers: the New York City Employees Retirement System, the New York City Teachers Retirement System, and the New York City Board of Education Retirement System. The Comptroller's office is supposed to determine which asset management companies are environmentally friendly and reject investing city employees' retirement funds in companies that have a poor record. NYCC and other environmental groups argued that Lander was stalling his office's investigation into controversial investment company BlackRock in order to delay divesting from it. NYCC threatened to stop endorsing Lander in his next campaign because he missed a September 2025 deadline to respond to its representatives.

== 2025 New York City mayoral campaign ==
Map of Lander's vote share in the first round of the Democratic primary by precinct and borough

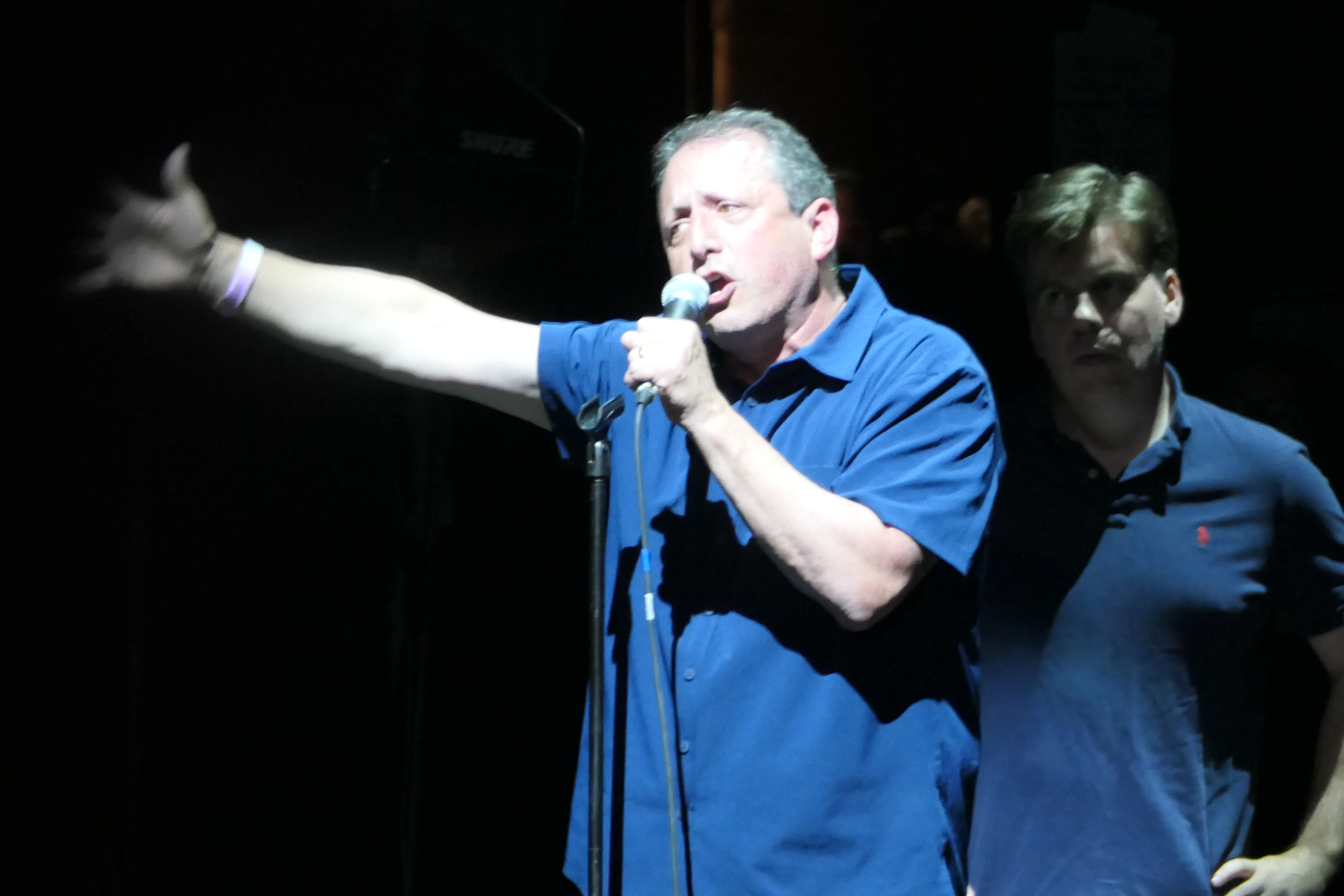
Lander at Gogol Bordello's show at Prospect Park shortly after the election

On July 30, 2024, Lander, then the city comptroller, announced that he would challenge incumbent Mayor Eric Adams in the 2025 New York City mayoral election. His launch video highlighted the high cost of child care and cuts to library budgets.

In March 2025, the Working Families Party endorsed Lander as one of four candidates on an unranked slate. Representative Alexandria Ocasio-Cortez, announcing her ranked slate in June, placed him third, after Zohran Mamdani and Adrienne Adams.

On June 12, 2025, the opinion section of The New York Times published rankings from a 15-member panel it had assembled. The panel placed Lander first overall for the Democratic primary for mayor.

On June 13, 2025, the day before early voting began, Lander and Mamdani cross-endorsed each other and asked their supporters to rank the pair first and second in a bid to defeat the front-runner, former New York governor Andrew Cuomo.

Lander placed third in the June 24 primary, receiving about 11% of first-choice votes. Mamdani won the nomination, defeating Cuomo in the final round of the ranked-choice count.

After the primary, Lander campaigned for Mamdani in the general election. Gothamist and The New York Times reported that Lander hoped to become Mamdani's first deputy mayor. According to the Times, Mamdani considered Lander for the job and told him in late October that he planned to choose someone else. In the same conversation, Mamdani reportedly offered to support Lander in a primary challenge to U.S. Representative Dan Goldman, an idea Lander had raised.

== U.S. House of Representatives ==
=== Elections ===
==== 2026 ====
2026 Democratic primary results Lander: 50–60%; 60–70%; 70–80%; 80–90%; 90–100%; 100%; Goldman: 50–60%; 60–70%; 70–80%; 80–90%; 90–100%; 100%

On December 10, 2025, Lander announced his candidacy for New York's 10th congressional district, attempting to primary moderate incumbent Dan Goldman from the left. He was endorsed by New York City mayor Zohran Mamdani, U.S. Senator Elizabeth Warren, U.S. Senator Bernie Sanders, New York City Public Advocate Jumaane Williams, and the Working Families Party. The district voted 60.3% in favor of Mamdani in the mayoral election and was Lander's strongest congressional district in the Democratic mayoral primary.

Despite his district overwhelmingly voting for Mamdani, Goldman did not endorse Mamdani during the mayoral election due to differences in opinion over Israel. After Lander announced his candidacy, other potential progressive challengers dropped out to bolster Lander's candidacy, including Alexa Avilés, who had already received the support of the New York City Democratic Socialists of America. On June 2, the pro-Palestine super PAC American Priorities announced that it would spend $2 million in support of a trio of progressive candidates in New York consisting of Lander as well as Darializa Avila Chevalier and Claire Valdez.

Lander defeated Goldman 66 to 34% in the Democratic primary on June 23, 2026. New York's 10th district is considered a safe seat with a Cook Partisan Voting Index of D+26, so Lander's win was considered tantamount to election. Lander won in the general election on November 3, 2026.

== Political positions ==
=== Participatory budgeting ===
Lander was one of four Council members who brought participatory budgeting to New York City, which allows citizens to propose, develop, and vote on items in the municipal budget. As of 2026, 22 of the 51 New York City Council Districts engage in participatory budgeting.

=== Labor ===
In 2013, Lander played a key role in a campaign to pass paid sick leave over Mayor Bloomberg's veto, telling the Brooklyn Reporter the legislation would "make our city a fairer, more compassionate place to live and work". In 2015, Lander passed legislation to ban discriminatory employment credit checks. In March 2015, outside a Park Slope car wash that was closed at the time, Lander was arrested for blocking traffic to show support for eight striking car washers; it was his fourth arrest. In November 2016, he announced his intention to get arrested as part of the "Fight for $15" National Day of Action, saying it was "part of a long tradition of civil disobedience, and it takes a little courage".

Lander has crafted a number of workers' rights policies. In 2017, he passed legislation to require fast food and retail companies to give their workers stable scheduling and restrict on-call scheduling and last-minute changes. Lander also sponsored a successful bill to prevent fast food workers from being fired without just cause and to allow them to appeal terminations through arbitration. He worked with the Freelancers Union to create the Freelance Isn't Free Act, the first legislation of its kind to ensure that freelancers and independent contractors are paid fully and on time. In 2018, Lander achieved the first ruling in the country to guarantee a living wage for Uber, Lyft, and other for-hire drivers.

By April 2020, Lander had sponsored over 2,254 articles of legislation. City and State New York ranked Lander's performance in the lower half of all New York City lawmakers, placing him 30th out of the 51 councilmembers; the ranking criteria included number of bills introduced, number of bills signed into law, attendance, and responsiveness to questions from constituents and the media.

=== Healthcare ===
In December 2017, Lander was arrested alongside Ady Barkan at the U.S. Capitol while protesting a bill that lowered taxes on corporations and wealthy people while cutting healthcare.

Lander supports implementing a Medicare for All system.

=== Housing ===
Lander opposed rezoning the site of Long Island College Hospital to include affordable housing. In July 2017, he was the primary sponsor of 20 local laws enacted by the City Council and signed by the mayor. Lander also played a role in helping shepherd the Community Safety Act through the City Council, along with councilmember Jumaane Williams. In 2017, Lander worked with advocates at the Association of Neighborhood and Housing Development and Make the Road New York to create a Certificate of No Harassment program that provides the strongest protections against tenant harassment and displacement of any law in the country. As part of the #TooHotToLearn campaign, Lander led the push to secure air conditioning for all New York City Public Schools classrooms, shining a spotlight on the 25 percent of classrooms that lacked it.

==== Homelessness ====
Since 2019, Lander has drawn criticism and, in his words, "anger" and "suspicion", for vocally supporting contracts for two homeless shelters in particular. Opponents of the shelters claimed that the contracts contain up to $89 million of unexplained cost compared to contracts for equivalent shelters, and that costs were too high at $10,557 per unit per month. Since 2020, Lander has been a leading advocate of a program that has moved over 9,500 homeless people (his goal is 30,000) to vacant New York City hotel rooms to provide space for social distancing during the COVID-19 pandemic, at an average cost of $174 per room per night ($5,293 per person per month).

Lander's efforts drew intense criticism from Mayor Bill de Blasio's New York City Department of Social Services, which Lander called "cartoonish insults". The program drew strong reactions from neighborhood residents, with some calling the homeless men "subhuman" and saying the program led to increased crime, open drug sales and drug use, public sex acts, and street harassment, and worrying about the risk of having sex offenders housed near a public school; other residents were more open to the program, and the owner of a restaurant next door to the hotel reported that, despite some residents' alarm, there had been no problems.

=== Social justice ===
In January 2021, Lander said: "As a white man, [the work of racial justice] starts by listening as honestly as I can to Black people about the anger and pain they are feeling, and the system of white supremacy and systemic racism it reflects. That is not easy, because it implicates me". He supported removing the statue of Christopher Columbus from Columbus Circle.

=== Immigration ===
On June 17, 2025, Comptroller Brad Lander attempted to observe immigration hearings in 26 Federal Plaza, which serves as an immigration court, an ICE staging facility, and ICE's New York City headquarters. After one immigrant defendant's hearing, plain clothes Department of Homeland Security (DHS) officers (some wearing masks) surrounded the defendant, prompting Lander to link arms with him. DHS officers tried to force the two men apart as Lander asked them whether they possessed an arrest warrant. One officer appeared to attempt to show Lander a judicial warrant, but other officers pinned Lander against the wall and handcuffed him as an onlooker cheered on the officers. Lander was the taken into an elevator by ICE agents who detained him for "assaulting law enforcement" and "impeding a federal officer," according to a DHS spokesperson. New York governor Kathy Hochul later visited and censured DHS agents for arresting an elected official, exclaiming "What the hell is happening to this country?" The incident was emblematic of instructions given to ICE officers to "arrest people immediately after a judge has ordered them to be deported."

=== Israel and Palestine ===
Lander's council district included large numbers of Jewish and Muslim people. According to The Forward, Lander has worked to balance relationships with both groups, "befriending both the far-right Brooklyn politician Dov Hikind and the pro-Palestinian activist and organizer Linda Sarsour". Hikind criticized Lander and other progressive politicians for not distancing themselves from Sarsour, citing her criticism of Israel and past associations with controversial figures such as Louis Farrakhan.

In 2020, Lander wrote that he had visited the West Bank to learn more about conditions under the Israeli occupation and expressed support for efforts to achieve Palestinian human rights.

In March 2023, Lander wrote an op-ed in the left-wing Israeli newspaper Haaretz urging President Joe Biden and Secretary of State Antony Blinken to stop providing a "blank check" to an "increasingly authoritarian" Israeli government and asking Democrats to stop obeying the pro-Israel lobby group AIPAC. He wrote that he participated in a protest outside the Israeli consulate in solidarity with the 2023 Israeli judicial reform protests.

Lander split with and left the Democratic Socialists of America in 2023 following the October 7 attacks. In a September 2025 speech, he championed the creation of an alliance "of anti-Zionists and liberal Zionists" seeking to end "the horrors in Gaza" in an appearance with Mamdani before the 2025 mayoral election. According to New York, he is "a liberal Zionist who has called Israel's war in Gaza a genocide and supports conditioning military aid" to Israel.

In a December 2025 interview with Zeteo, Lander said that if elected, he would vote to recognize a Palestinian state and oppose the sale of offensive weapons to Israel. Lander also strongly opposed the censure of U.S. Representative Rashida Tlaib while calling for U.S. Representative Randy Fine to be censured for his Islamophobic comments, including calls for genocide of American Muslims.

In September 2026, Lander attended a protest ahead of a speech by Israeli prime minister Benjamin Netanyahu at the United Nations General Assembly.

Lander was detained along with a group of 90 rabbis and volunteers in the West Bank in October 2026. The entourage, organized by Rabbis for Human Rights, was accompanying Palestinian farmers to harvest olives. The action was similar to previous military closures and international travel denials in response to previous olive harvests, but the detention phase was unusual. Activists assert no permits from the military are required for landowners to harvest their own crops in Area C, and that the area was declared to be a closed military zone after they had been harvesting for several days. Lander was released after several hours, as were the others who were detained.

=== Public safety and policing ===
In March 2020, as the COVID-19 pandemic began, Lander urged that the police suspend criminal arrests, summonses, warrant enforcement, and parole violations for low-level offenses, and release most of the over 900 people incarcerated at Rikers Island who were over 50 years old. Lander voiced support for defunding the police and limiting police powers by cutting their budget by $1 billion in 2020. In December 2020, he called for the disbandment of the New York City Police Department Vice Unit and for decriminalizing prostitution.

== Election history ==
Election history
Office	Year	Election	Results
NYC Council District 39	2009	Democratic; Primary	▌ ✓ Brad Lander 40.57% ▌Josh Skaller 24.92% ▌John L. Heyer II 23.09% ▌Bob Zuckerman 7.81% ▌Gary G. Reilly 3.61%
NYC Council District 39	2009	General	▌ ✓ Brad Lander (D) 70.49% ▌Joe Nardiello (R) 16.58% ▌David Pechefsky (Green) 8.87% ▌George Smith (Conservative) 2.95% ▌Roger Sarrabo (L) 1.11%
NYC Council District 39	2013	General	▌ ✓ Brad Lander (D) 91.72% ▌James Murray (Conservative) 8.09%
NYC Comptroller	2021	General	▌ ✓ Brad Lander (D) 69.6% ▌Daby Carreras (R) 23.0% ▌Paul Rodriguez (Conservative) 5.5%

2025 New York City Democratic mayoral primary
Candidate	Round 1		Round 2		Round 3	
Candidate	Votes	%	Votes	%	Votes	%
Zohran Mamdani	469,642	43.82%	469,755	43.86%	573,169	56.39%
Andrew Cuomo	387,137	36.12%	387,377	36.17%	443,229	43.61%
Brad Lander	120,634	11.26%	120,707	11.27%	Eliminated	
Adrienne Adams	44,192	4.12%	44,359	4.14%	Eliminated	
Scott Stringer	17,820	1.66%	17,894	1.67%	Eliminated	
Zellnor Myrie	10,593	0.99%	10,648	0.99%	Eliminated	
Whitney Tilson	8,443	0.79%	8,525	0.80%	Eliminated	
Michael Blake	4,366	0.41%	4,389	0.41%	Eliminated	
Jessica Ramos	4,273	0.40%	4,294	0.40%	Eliminated	
Paperboy Prince	1,560	0.15%	1,628	0.15%	Eliminated	
Selma Bartholomew	1,489	0.14%	1,505	0.14%	Eliminated	
Write-ins	1,581	0.15%	Eliminated			
Active votes	1,071,730	100.00%	1,071,081	99.94%	1,016,398	94.84%
Exhausted ballots	—N/a		649	0.06%	55,332	5.16%
Source: New York City Board of Elections

2026 New York's 10th congressional district Democratic Primary
Party	Candidate	Votes	%
Democratic	Brad Lander	55,060	65.8
Democratic	Dan Goldman (incumbent)	28,445	34.0
Total votes		83,661	100.0

== Personal life ==
Lander lives in Brooklyn with his wife, Meg Barnette, a former executive at Planned Parenthood, now president of Nonprofit New York. He also served as housing chair of Brooklyn Community Board 6, served on the board of directors of the charity Jewish Funds for Justice, and is a Little League coach in the 78th Precinct Youth Council.

Lander is a fan of the Revolutions podcast and in relation has described himself as a "Bundist at heart."

== Notes ==
Political offices
Preceded by Scott Stringer	Comptroller of New York City; 2022–2025	Succeeded by Mark Levine
U.S. House of Representatives
Preceded by Dan Goldman	Member of the U.S. House of Representatives from New York's 10th congressional district Taking office 2027	Elect
