= Anna V. Jefferson =

American politician

Anna V. Jefferson (May 7, 1926 – June 24, 2011) was an American politician from New York. She was the first African-American woman to represent Brooklyn in the New York Senate, in office from 1983 to 1984.

== Life ==
She was born on May 7, 1926, in Columbia, South Carolina, the daughter of Maxie Jefferson and Viola Wallace Jefferson. The family moved to the Bedford-Stuyvesant area in Brooklyn, New York City. There she attended Public School Nr. 44 and Girls' High School. She graduated B.S. in Accounting and Business Administration from New York University. She was a certified teacher of book-keeping and office-practice.

In 1969, she became the Director of the department created by the New York City Board of Education and put in charge of the automation of the payrolls. She also entered politics as a Democrat.

Anna Jefferson was a member of the New York State Senate (22nd D.) in 1983 and 1984. In 1984, the Democratic 22nd Senate district organization denied Jefferson a re-nomination, and instead nominated Velmanette Montgomery for the seat. Jefferson tried to challenge Montgomery in the Democratic primary but her petition was rejected ultimately by the New York Court of Appeals. The cover sheet of Jefferson's petition showed 5,074 as the total number of signatures while the petition was signed by only 3,831 registered Democrats. Jefferson claimed that a campaign worker made a simple mistake with a calculator, and only 3,000 signatures were necessary to get on the primary ballot. Nevertheless, the court ruled that this formal error invalidated the petition as a whole.

She died on June 24, 2011.

New York State Assembly
Preceded by Martin M. Solomon	New York State Assembly; 22nd District; 1983–1984	Succeeded by Velmanette Montgomery
