= Velmanette Montgomery =

American politician

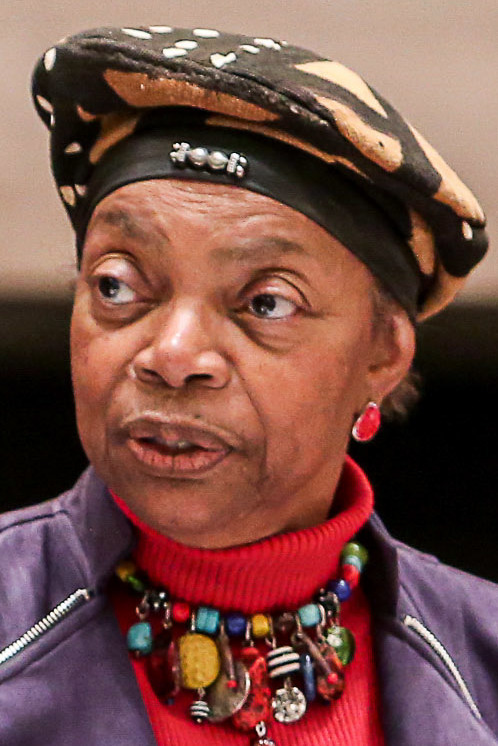
- Montgomery in 2020

Member of the New York State Senate from the 25th district
- In office January 1, 1985 – December 31, 2020
- Preceded by: Anna V. Jefferson
- Succeeded by: Jabari Brisport
- Constituency: 22nd district (1985–92); 18th district (1993–2012); 25th district (2013-2020)

Personal details
- Born: December 22, 1942 (age 83) Houston, Texas, U.S.
- Party: Democratic
- Spouse: William Walker
- Children: 1
- Education: New York University; Columbia University
- Website: Official website

Velmanette Montgomery (born December 22, 1942) is an American Democratic Party politician who represented the 25th district of the New York State Senate from 1984 until 2020. The district comprised Fort Greene, Boerum Hill, Red Hook, Bedford-Stuyvesant, Sunset Park, Gowanus, and Park Slope, among other neighborhoods located within the borough of Brooklyn.

== Early life and career ==
Montgomery was born in Houston, but relocated to New York City to attain a master's degree in education from New York University. She later became a Revson Fellow at Columbia University.

Prior to elected office, Montgomery worked as a teacher, adjunct professor, and day care director as well as the cofounder of the Day Care Forum of New York City. She has also served as president of Community School Board 13.

In 1991, Montgomery was awarded an Honorary Doctor of Laws from St. Joseph's College.

== New York Senate ==
Montgomery was first elected in 1984, succeeding Anna V. Jefferson, who did not run for re-election that year. She has been re-elected seventeen times, never facing serious opposition. Montgomery has never lost an election.

In the Senate, Montgomery is the Chair of the Senate Committee on Children and Families. She is a reproductive rights advocate, sponsoring legislation on the topic, and a longtime nurse practitioner advocate. She was an original sponsor of legislation to legalize needle exchange programs to stop the spread of AIDS, wrote the law banning female genital mutilation, and sponsored a current law that prohibits the discrimination in the granting of funeral or bereavement leave to workers in committed same-sex relationships.

In 2013 Montgomery was secretly recorded at the home of then-Senator Shirley Huntley, as revealed in a federal corruption probe of Huntley. The probe centered around former Senator Huntley who pled guilty to embezzling over $87,000 in taxpayer money. Montgomery was never accused of wrongdoing in the probe.

In 2019, Montgomery was elected Majority Conference Secretary.

On January 11, 2020, Montgomery announced that she would be retiring from the State Senate and not seeking reelection in 2020. She endorsed Assemblywoman Tremaine Wright in her retirement announcement.

New York State Senate
Preceded by Anna V. Jefferson	New York State Senate; 22nd district 1985–1992	Succeeded by Martin M. Solomon
Preceded by Donald Halperin	New York State Senate; 18th district 1993–2012	Succeeded by Martin Malave Dilan
Preceded by Daniel Squadron	New York State Senate; 25th district 2013–2020	Succeeded by Jabari Brisport
Preceded by Carl Kruger	Chairwoman of the Committee on Children and Families; 2009–2010	Succeeded by Patrick Gallivan
Preceded by Carl Kruger	Chairwoman of the Committee on Social Services; 2009	Succeeded by Daniel Squadron
