= Melissa DeRosa =

American political aide (born 1982)

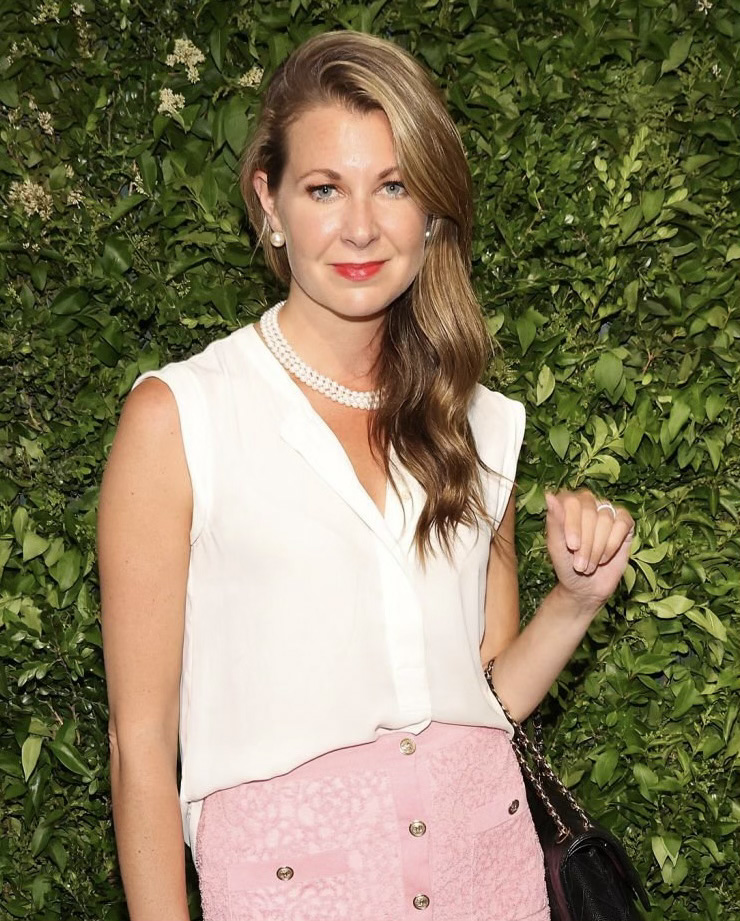
- DeRosa in 2022

Secretary to the Governor of New York
- In office April 17, 2017 – August 24, 2021
- Governor: Andrew Cuomo
- Preceded by: William Mulrow
- Succeeded by: Karen Persichilli Keogh

Personal details
- Born: September 29, 1982 (age 44) Rochester, New York, U.S.
- Party: Democratic
- Spouse: Matthew Wing (m. 2016; div. 2021)
- Education: Cornell University (BA, MPA)

Melissa DeRosa (born September 29, 1982) is a media personality, a Democratic strategist, a published author, and a former American government official from the state of New York. She served as secretary to the former governor of New York, Andrew Cuomo, from 2017 until 2021. DeRosa was described by the New York Times as the "most powerful appointed official" in the state as well as being the first woman appointed to the role. In September 2026, she joined Fox News as a contributor and co-host of their women-led podcast "The Girls".

== Early life and education ==
DeRosa was born on September 29, 1982, in Rochester, N.Y. and raised in Albany and Saratoga Springs, New York and has two siblings. She is the daughter of Melody DeRosa, a retired education technology consultant for Texas Instruments, and Giorgio DeRosa, a senior partner at the Albany lobbying firm Bolton-St. Johns. DeRosa's brother and sister also work at Bolton-St. Johns.

At 16, DeRosa was an intern for the political director of the New York State AFL-CIO.

DeRosa attended the private school, Albany Academy for Girls, graduating in 2000. She graduated in 2004 from the Cornell University School of Industrial and Labor Relations. While an undergraduate student at Cornell, she worked in the Senate office of Hillary Clinton in Washington, D.C. during a summer.

DeRosa worked for a year as a publicist for Theory, a fashion house in New York. She then worked as a lobbyist for Bolton-St. Johns. She later worked in the press office of Congresswoman Nydia Velázquez. In 2009, she completed an MPA from the Cornell Institute for Public Affairs.

== Career ==
=== Media ===
DeRosa is a frequent media commentator on politics and government. Cornell's Communication Advisory Board profile describes her as a frequent television commentator appearing on outlets including Fox News, CNBC, and NewsNation. Cornell CALS describes DeRosa as a former Daily Beast contributor.

In September 2026, DeRosa joined Fox News as a contributor. She was also announced as co-host of The Girls, a Fox News podcast discussing politics, money and popular culture, alongside Rachel Campos-Duffy, Harris Faulkner, Kat Timpf and Samantha Ponder.

=== Democratic strategist ===
DeRosa consulted on communications and policy for the Puerto Rico Federal Affairs Administration. According to her website, she is the founder of a strategic advisory firm focused on public affairs, communications, and crisis strategy. In 2025, DeRosa served as an adviser to Cuomo's New York City mayoral campaign. She also serves on Cornell University's Communication Advisory Board. Cornell CALS describes DeRosa as a Democratic strategist.

=== Secretary to Governor Cuomo ===
DeRosa worked as Director of Communications and Legislation for the Albany-based lobbying firm Cordo & Company. From 2009 to 2011, DeRosa was the New York State Director of Organizing for America, a project of the Democratic National Committee founded after the presidential inauguration of Barack Obama. In 2011, DeRosa became deputy chief of staff and later acting chief of staff for New York State Attorney General Eric Schneiderman.

In March 2013, she became Director of Communications for Governor Andrew Cuomo. DeRosa later became strategic adviser. In 2015, DeRosa was appointed Chief of Staff. In 2020, DeRosa was appointed to serve on the transition committee to President-Elect Joe Biden, serving as senior advisor to Steve Ricchetti, the White House's incoming counselor and helping to assist the incoming administration's COVID response.

In 2017, DeRosa was promoted to Secretary to the Governor of New York, and became Cuomo's top aide and one of his closest advisers. The role was described by The New York Times as the most powerful appointed official in the state, and she was the first woman appointed to the role.

DeRosa was involved in steering bills through the legislature, including minimum wage, paid family leave and expanded insurance coverage for in vitro fertilization. She chaired the New York State Council on Women and Girls and headed the COVID-19 maternity task force. City & State New York described her as the Cuomo administration's "go-to person" on a 2020 budget proposal to legalize paid gestational surrogacy, which DeRosa described as a priority of the Council. In 2017, DeRosa spoke publicly about her experience with sexual harassment and encouraged women to "speak up and speak out." DeRosa also chaired the New York State Domestic Violence COVID Task Force.

During the COVID-19 pandemic, she had a major role in the coordination and management of the New York response. DeRosa chaired the state's COVID-19 Maternity Task Force. In 2020, Harper's Bazaar featured DeRosa on the cover of its "Voices of Hope" 2020 summer issue, after Christy Turlington selected her as one of five women "who give her hope".

In March 2020, when COVID-19 testing was limited in New York, The New York Times reported that Cuomo's family and other influential people received priority access to coronavirus testing and expedited results. The article said Giorgio DeRosa, Melissa DeRosa's father, was among those treated as a "special". State officials attributed the priority testing decision to the fact that DeRosa had been staying with her father at the time, and that she had close and regular contact with Cuomo and others involved in the pandemic response.

In March 2021, The Wall Street Journal and The New York Times reported that Cuomo aides, including DeRosa, Linda Lacewell and Jim Malatras, were involved in changing a July 2020 state Health Department report on COVID-19 deaths among nursing-home residents. The Cuomo administration said the out-of-facility data had been omitted because the Department of Health could not confirm that it had been adequately verified, and that the report's conclusions were not changed.

DeRosa announced her resignation as Secretary to the Governor on August 8, 2021, five days after the New York attorney general released a report concluding that Cuomo had sexually harassed multiple women, findings that Cuomo disputed during the investigation. The report described DeRosa as involved in the Executive Chamber's response to Lindsey Boylan's allegations, including matters relating to the release of confidential files about Boylan. A lawyer for DeRosa said she "consulted with and relied upon advice of experienced counsel". The report also discussed DeRosa's involvement in the administration's response to allegations made by a New York State Police officer. DeRosa denied the allegations, and a related civil lawsuit based on the AG's finding was dismissed as baseless in 2023. Cuomo announced his resignation on August 10, 2021, effective 14 days later.

== Publications ==
In October 2023, DeRosa published the memoir What's Left Unsaid: My Life at the Center of Power, Politics & Crisis. Kirkus Reviews described the book as "an angry, raw, and briskly told memoir", while Lloyd Green of The Guardian wrote that the book was "deliberate and focused".

The New York Law Journal review of the book said, "This insider’s view of the political storm that led to Cuomo’s forced resignation raises serious questions about the roles played by power politics, a compliant media, and an attorney general who wished to be governor, in orchestrating the forced resignation of a duly elected governor." Vanity Fair's review called DeRosa's memoir "a scorching book loaded with insider detail".

Other reviews were more critical. Publishers Weekly wrote that DeRosa "defends the former governor at every turn", including in relation to the nursing-home and sexual-harassment controversies. In New York magazine, Rebecca Traister described the book as an effort to rehabilitate DeRosa's image and portray Cuomo favorably.

== Personal life ==
In 2016, DeRosa married Matthew Wing, an Uber senior communications officer, formerly a Cuomo press secretary in 2013 and 2014, and then communications director for the governor's re-election campaign. They met in 2013 when both worked for Cuomo.

DeRosa and Wing divorced after separating in 2021. Her former mother-in-law is Audrey Strauss, the former Acting U.S. Attorney for the Southern District of New York.

== Bibliography ==
- What's Left Unsaid: My Life at the Center of Power, Politics & Crisis (2023)
