= Conrad Tillard =

American minister, activist and politician (born 1964)

The Reverend Conrad Tillard
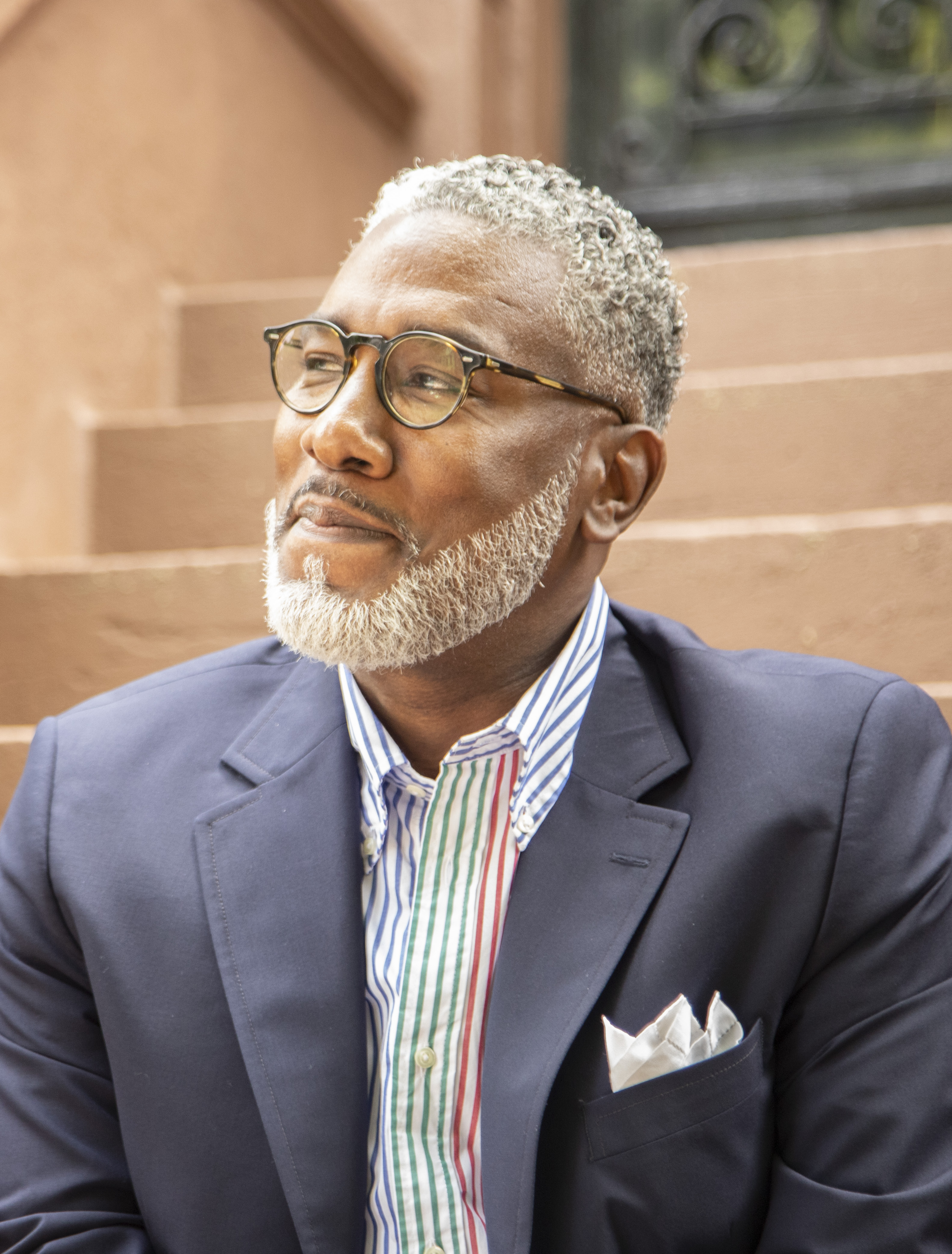
- Tillard in 2022
- Born: Conrad Bennette Tillard Sr. September 15, 1964 (age 62); St. Louis, Missouri, U.S.
- Other names: Conrad X, Conrad Muhammad
- Education: University of Pennsylvania (BA); Harvard University; Union Theological Seminary (MDiv); Princeton Theological Seminary (MTh)
- Occupations: Baptist minister, radio host, activist, politician, author
- Political party: Democratic
- Children: 5
- Website: https://www.conradtillard.com

Conrad Bennette Tillard (born September 15, 1964) is an American Baptist minister, radio host, activist, politician, and author.

Tillard was in his early years a prominent minister of the black nationalist organization the Nation of Islam (NOI). He was at age 25 appointed Minister of Mosque No. 7 in Harlem, a position formerly held by Malcolm X. He became known as the "Hip-Hop Minister," noted for his outspoken opposition to the promotion of gangsterism in hip-hop music lyrics, and for defusing potentially violent feuds between rappers.

Tillard left the NOI in 1997 when he was 32 years old, and returned to Christianity. He became a Christian preacher at Abyssinian Baptist Church in Harlem, then the Senior Pastor at the Nazarene Congregational Church, a United Church of Christ, in Bedford Stuyvesant, Brooklyn, in New York City, and now the Senior Minister at Flatbush Tompkins Congregational Church in Flatbush, Brooklyn. He also wrote a memoir, was a radio host, and became an adjunct college professor.

Tillard ran for New York State Senator in 2022, in a Democratic primary campaign for the New York State Senate against incumbent State Senator Jabari Brisport. He was endorsed by New York City Mayor Eric Adams. During that campaign, he became the subject of renewed controversy over his past history of antisemitic, anti-abortion, and anti-LGBTQ remarks. Brisport won the primary.

== Early life and education ==
Tillard was born in St. Louis, Missouri. He moved to Atlanta, Georgia, and then to Washington, D.C., when he was very young, and grew up in the Christian religion. His biological father was a tailor and part-time jazz musician. After his parents divorced during his childhood, his mother married a Baptist minister. In D.C., he attended Wilson High School and graduated from Francis L. Cardozo High School.

Tillard attended Lincoln University, which was historically Black, transferred to Middlebury College in the fall of 1984, then to Wesleyan University. He then transferred in 1986 to the University of Pennsylvania in Philadelphia, where he became President of the Black Students League and earned a B.A. in African American studies in 1988.

Tillard studied in graduate school at the Harvard Divinity School in the late 1990s, and at Harvard's John F. Kennedy School of Government in public administration. He earned a Master of Divinity degree in systematic theology and Christian social ethics at the Union Theological Seminary in New York City, and graduated from Princeton Theological Seminary with a Master of Theology in practical theology (with a concentration in congregational ministry).

== Career ==
=== Early career and Nation of Islam ===
In 1984, Tillard worked as a coordinator of the presidential campaign of Jesse Jackson, first in Philadelphia and then at Jackson's national headquarters in Washington, D.C. Years later he said: "I became discouraged and almost bitter against the political process, because I felt that he was disrespected, but that was in my immaturity."

At 19 years of age in 1984, while he was in college, Tillard converted to Islam and joined the Nation of Islam (NOI). He became known as Conrad X, and later Conrad Muhammad. He was attracted to the organization because it made him feel strong and proud of being Black, rather than due to an attraction to the religion of Islam; he also felt that racism and corruption were problems in the Arab world. He moved to New York City. At 25 years of age he was appointed minister of Mosque No. 7 in Harlem in 1991, as a successor to Malcolm X, and The Boston Globe described him as the heir-apparent to NOI head Louis Farrakhan. While with the NOI, Tillard promoted antisemitic views (including in 1992 a conspiracy theory that Jewish people were the cause of the hole in the ozone layer), and in 1996 referred to Brooklyn assemblyman Jules Polonetsky as a "snotty-nosed Jewish politician," and to Jewish people as "bloodsuckers". New York Magazine reported that sources said that some within the NOI became jealous of his ascent, and others disliked what they saw as a streak of moderation on his part. He was stripped of his position in 1997, reportedly after internal politics and threats of violence by NOI officials, or disagreements with Farrakhan, or over charges of financial mismanagement. Tillard resigned from the NOI that year, in a public break, when he was 32 years old. He later said: "I just became frustrated with the direction of the movement. I believe that as African-Americans we can be critical of this country, but we have to embrace our American-ness, and we have to embrace the process. I've really grown to believe that we have the best political system in the world. I've grown to appreciate democracy. And I think the Nation is challenged to embrace those ideas."

Tillard became known as the "Hip-Hop Minister," as he both criticized hip hop lyrics, and defused potentially violent feuds between rappers. He appears in the documentary Hip-Hop: Beyond Beats and Rhymes.

In the 1990s and early 2000s, Tillard was an outspoken critic of hip hop lyrics that he perceived as degrading and dangerous to Blacks. He said such lyrics suggested "that we are penny-chasing, Champagne-drinking, gold-teeth-wearing, modern-day Sambos, pimps and players." He believed that in seeking to emulate the lyrics in gangsta rap, young Black Americans became victims of mass incarceration, violence, sexual exploitation, and drug crime.

In the 1990s, he started an organization called A Movement for C.H.H.A.N.G.E. ("Conscious Hip Hop Activism Necessary for Global Empowerment"), to advocate for "conscious hip hop activism", voter registration and education, community organizing, and social empowerment for black youth. He criticized hip-hop lyrics that portrayed American black communities as degenerate. He also criticized the businessmen who supported that approach. He feuded with Def Jam founder Russell Simmons in 2001, accusing him of stoking violence by allowing the frequent use of words such as "nigga" and "bitch" in rap lyrics.

Tillard became a fixture in hip-hop after he arranged a meeting and a truce in a feud between rising bands Wreckx-N-Effect and A Tribe Called Quest. Tillard also counseled Sean "Diddy" Combs during his feud with rival Suge Knight, and criticized him for what he saw as his mistreatment of Shyne Barrow.

After the drive-by shooting murder of rapper Tupac Shakur in 1996, Tillard organized a "Day of Atonement" event to advocate against violent themes in hip-hop music, to promote unity, and to celebrate Shakur's life. He invited rap group A Tribe Called Quest, Chuck D with Public Enemy, Kool Herc, Afrika Bambaataa, model Bethann Hardison, actor Malik Yoba, Bad Boy Records president Sean Combs, and rapper The Notorious B.I.G. There were an estimated 2,000 attendees.

Tillard also served as a radio talk show host on urban adult contemporary FM radio station WBLS. In 1999, after studying at Harvard Divinity School, he moved to Harlem, in Manhattan.

In 2001, Tillard criticized the Reverend Al Sharpton and other civil rights leaders, calling them "hired guns" for not condemning rappers Sean Combs or Shyne Barrows. Tillard later served as a spiritual advisor to Shyne. Tillard organized another summit in Harlem at the Adam Clayton Powell Jr. State Office Building on 125th Street over what he perceived as negative imagery in hip hop. Def Jam Recordings founder Russell Simmons organized a counter-summit, urging the public not to "support open and aggressive critics of the hip-hop community".

=== 2002-present: minister, author, and political candidate ===
In 2002, having reverted to his birth name, Tillard sought to run for U.S. Congress in New York's 15th congressional district in Harlem in Manhattan against 32-year incumbent Democratic Congressman Charles Rangel. He initially sought to run as a Republican, but was unable to secure the party's nomination. He ultimately failed to qualify for a position on the ballot for the Democratic nomination for the Congressional seat, as he did not produce 1,250 valid signatures to qualify for the primary ballot; of the 1,652 signatures he filed, only 630 were deemed valid.

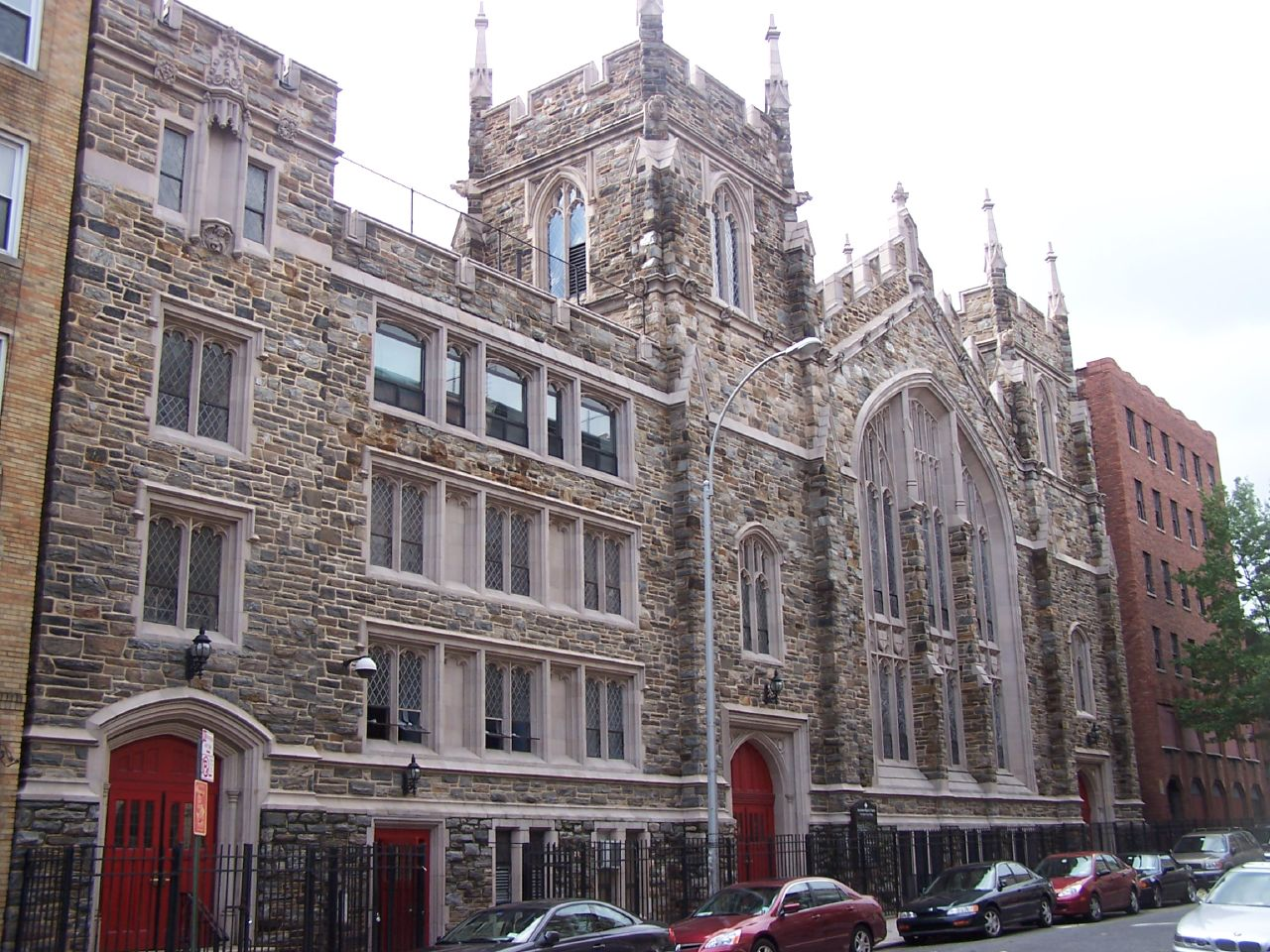
Abyssinian Baptist Church

After he left the NOI, while at Harvard, Tillard said he underwent a "powerful conversion experience" and "just one night became overwhelmed by the presence of God and Christ...I encountered Christ in a very personal way." Tillard returned to Christianity, and became a Baptist minister. In 2003, he became a preacher at the Abyssinian Baptist Church in Harlem, in Manhattan. He said: "It may have taken me a long time to get there, but I finally came home." He was ordained by the Reverend Calvin Butts, the senior pastor at the church.

Tillard was selected in 2005 and 2006 by Beliefnet as one of "The Most Influential Spiritual Black Leaders" in the United States.

In 2009, Tillard went on to become the Senior Pastor at The Nazarene Congregational Church, a United Church of Christ in Bedford Stuyvesant, Brooklyn, which is one of the oldest African-American congregations in New York City. He was selected that year as "Pastor of the Year" in Brooklyn by Church Women United.

After Tillard returned to Christianity, he began working on a book about his early life and ministry, titled In My Father's House: The Spiritual and Political Memoir of the Man Once Known as the Hip Hop Minister, Conrad Muhammad. The book was published by Atria Books in 2010.

After moving to Brooklyn, Tillard ran for an open seat in 2013 in the New York City Council's 36th Council District in Bedford Stuyvesant and Crown Heights in Brooklyn against Robert Cornegy Jr. — who won the election — and three other candidates. Tillard received 13% of the vote, which amounted to 1,912 votes.

In 2015, Tillard became host and executive producer of the radio show "Conversations with Conrad!" on WHCR 90.3 FM in New York City.

In 2016, Tillard became an adjunct professor in the Black Studies Department of City College of the City University of New York.

In 2018, Tillard became the Senior Minister at Flatbush Tompkins Congregational Church in Ditmas Park in Flatbush, Brooklyn, New York. The church is well over a century old.

In 2022, Tillard launched a campaign for New York State Senate in District 25 (covering part of eastern and north-central Brooklyn, including Fort Greene, Boerum Hill, Red Hook, Bedford-Stuyvesant, Sunset Park, Gowanus, and Park Slope) against freshman State Senator Jabari Brisport, a member of the Democratic Socialists. Tillard ran as a more moderate and centrist candidate than Brisport, and was critical of his support of socialism. He also said: "I am running against someone who calls for defunding the police. I have gone to jail for advocating against police brutality, but I do not think defunding the police is the answer." During the race, Tillard became the subject of controversy over past antisemitic, anti-abortion, and anti-LGBTQ remarks while a member of the NOI in the mid-1990s, as well as vocally opposing abortion rights and same-sex marriage as recently as 2005; Tillard disavowed his former comments about Jews and gay people. Tillard said the comments were decades old, and did not reflect the man he now was. New York City Mayor Eric Adams said "I believe the Rev. Tillard of today is a lot different than the man who said those things decades ago. Since then, Rev. Tillard has been a minister and pastored prominent churches."

Tillard was endorsed by several moderate Democrats, including New York City Mayor Eric Adams, New York State Senator Kevin Parker, and former New York City Councilman Robert Cornegy, as well as rapper Chuck D. His campaign received funding from the real estate industry, including from the Republican- and real estate industry-funded (in the amount of $7,500) PAC set up by an ally of Mayor Adams, Striving for a Better New York. Brisport won re-nomination in the three-way race, with 70% of the vote to second-place Tillard's 16%.

== Personal life ==
He and his wife Tamecca have five children, Amir, Najmah, Conrad Jr., Zuriel, and Barack. When his son Barack was born three months after President Obama's inauguration in 2009, Tillard said he and his wife were very excited, and "we couldn't think of a better name." As of 2022, Tillard lived in Bedford Stuyvesant in Brooklyn, having previously lived in New York City in Harlem, Fort Greene, and Clinton Hill.

== See also ==
- List of people from Harlem
