= Steve Cohn =

American lawyer

Steve Cohn is a lawyer and a Democratic District Leader in Brooklyn, New York. He is a Democratic Committeeman in Brooklyn's 50th Assembly District. Cohn said in 2010 that he would not seek reelection as Democratic District Leader, after 27 years in the position.

== Background and family ==
Cohn, an Orthodox Jew, grew up in Williamsburg, Brooklyn, son of a judge who was also a Greenpoint and Williamsburg assemblyman from 1959 to 1968. His mother Lillian died in 1995.

== Career ==
Cohn was a law clerk for a Brooklyn judge, counsel to the two Brooklyn district council members from the district, and a part-time staff member on two Brooklyn Assembly subcommittees. Cohn has strong ties with the Williamsburg Hasidic community.

Cohn was a Democratic state committeeman for nearly 20 years, and an executive secretary of the Kings County Democratic Party, the oldest Democratic organization in the U.S. He is also a former president of the Brooklyn Bar Association.

In 2002, Cohn came in second in both the Democratic primary vote and the general election (as a Liberal) for Councilman for District 33 in Brooklyn, which runs from Brooklyn Heights to Greenpoint. Cohn raised $311,059 for his run for the seat.
