= Karen Persichilli Keogh =

American government official

Secretary to the Governor of New York
- Incumbent
- Assumed office August 24, 2021
- Governor: Kathy Hochul
- Preceded by: Melissa DeRosa

Personal details
- Party: Democratic
- Spouse: Michael Keogh
- Education: Stony Brook University 88'

Karen Persichilli Keogh is an American government official. She serves as Secretary to the Governor of New York, Kathy Hochul. Persichilli Keogh started in this role in August 2021.

== Early life and education ==
Persichilli Keogh was born in Long Island, New York and attended Stony Brook University.

== Career ==
Persichilli Keogh began her career at District Council 37 before moving to the city council working for Sal Albanese. After leaving Albanese's office, she began working for Speaker Peter Vallone. When Hillary Clinton won the 2000 United States Senate election in New York against Rick Lazio, she hired Persichilli Keogh to be her New York State Director. In the 2006 Senate election, Persichilli Keogh was chosen to run Clinton's re-election campaign for Senate.

Persichilli Keogh was the head of Global Philanthropy at Chase Bank after leaving federal service.

=== Secretary to Governor Hochul ===
In August 2021, Governor Hochul assumed the role upon the resignation of Governor Andrew Cuomo. Hochul replaced Melissa DeRosa with Persichilli Keogh upon becoming Governor. Secretary to the Governor is the number one appointed position in the Governor's Office. In the 2022 election, Governor Hochul was elected to a full term.

== Personal life ==
Persichilli Keogh is married to Michael Keogh. They have one daughter.
