= New York City's 39th City Council district =

New York City Council district in Brooklyn

- Boundaries following the 2020 census

Government
  - Councilmember: . Shahana Hanif. D–Kensington

Population (2010)
  - Total: 154,341

Demographics
  - White: 66%
  - Hispanic: 14%
  - Asian: 13%
  - Black: 4%
  - Other: 3%

Registration
  - Democratic: 73.6%
  - Republican: 6.8%
  - No party preference: 16.8%
- Registered voters (2021) 127,905

New York City's 39th City Council district is one of 51 districts in the New York City Council. It is currently represented by Democrat Shahana Hanif, who took office in 2022. Among the seat's prior occupants are former Mayor Bill de Blasio and former Comptroller Brad Lander.

== Geography ==
=== 2020s ===
District 39 is centered in the Brooklyn neighborhoods of Carroll Gardens, Park Slope, South Slope and Cobble Hill, also stretching south and west to cover Gowanus, the Columbia Waterfront, and portions of Windsor Terrace, Borough Park, Kensington and Parkville. Most of Prospect Park proper is also located within the district.

The district overlaps with Brooklyn Community Boards 2, 6, 7, 12, and 14, and with New York's 9th and 10th congressional districts. It also overlaps with the 17th, 20th, 21st, 22nd, 25th, and 26th districts of the New York State Senate, and with the 44th, 48th, 51st, and 52nd districts of the New York State Assembly.

=== 2010s ===
District 39 is based in the Brooklyn neighborhood of Park Slope, also stretching west and south to cover Gowanus, Cobble Hill, Carroll Gardens, Columbia Waterfront, and parts of Windsor Terrace, Borough Park, and Kensington. Most of Prospect Park proper is also located within the district.

The district overlaps with Brooklyn Community Boards 2, 6, 7, 8, and 12, and with New York's 7th, 9th, and 10th congressional districts. It also overlaps with the 17th, 20th, 21st, 25th, and 26th districts of the New York State Senate, and with the 42nd, 44th, 48th, 51st, and 52nd districts of the New York State Assembly.

== Members representing the district ==
Members	Party	Years served	Electoral history
District established January 1, 1992
Stephen DiBrienza (Windsor Terrace)	Democratic	January 1, 1992 – December 31, 2001	Redistricted from the 30th district and re-elected in 1991. Re-elected in 1993. Re-elected in 1997. Termed out.
Bill de Blasio (Park Slope)	Democratic	January 1, 2002 – December 31, 2009	Elected in 2001. Re-elected in 2003. Re-elected in 2005. Retired to run for New York City Public Advocate.
Brad Lander (Park Slope)	Democratic	January 1, 2010 – December 31, 2021	Elected in 2009. Re-elected in 2013. Re-elected in 2017. Termed out and ran for New York City Comptroller.
Shahana Hanif (Kensington)	Democratic	January 1, 2022 –	Elected in 2021. Re-elected in 2023. Re-elected in 2025.

== Recent election results ==
=== 2025 ===
The 2025 New York City Council elections were held on November 4, 2025, with primary elections occurring on June 24, 2025.

2025 New York City Council election, District 39
Primary election
Party	Candidate	Votes	%
Democratic	Shahana Hanif (incumbent)	32,553	70.0
Democratic	Maya Kornberg	12,066	25.9
Democratic	Nickie Kane	1,646	3.5
Write-in		252	0.5
Total votes		46,517	100
General election
Democratic	Shahana Hanif	39,911	
Working Families	Shahana Hanif	16,715	
Total	Shahana Hanif (incumbent)	56,626	85.9
Conservative	Brett Wynkoop	5,761	8.7
Libertarian	Matthew Morgan	1,834	2.7
Voters First	Nickie Kane	1,294	2.0
Write-in		429	0.7
Total votes		65,944	100.0
Democratic hold			

=== 2023 (redistricting) ===
Due to redistricting and the 2020 changes to the New York City Charter, councilmembers elected during the 2021 and 2023 City Council elections will serve two-year terms, with full four-year terms resuming after the 2025 New York City Council elections.

2023 New York City Council election, District 39
Party	Candidate	Votes	%
Democratic	Shahana Hanif	12,108	
Working Families	Shahana Hanif	5,792	
Total	Shahana Hanif (incumbent)	17,900	85.3
Republican	Arek Tomaszewski	2,173	
Conservative	Arek Tomaszewski	494	
Total	Arek Tomaszewski	2,667	12.7
Write-in		417	2.0
Total votes		20,984	100.0
Democratic hold			

=== 2021 ===
In 2019, voters in New York City approved Ballot Question 1, which implemented ranked-choice voting in all local elections. Under the new system, voters have the option to rank up to five candidates for every local office. Voters whose first-choice candidates fare poorly will have their votes redistributed to other candidates in their ranking until one candidate surpasses the 50 percent threshold. If one candidate surpasses 50 percent in first-choice votes, then ranked-choice tabulations will not occur.

2021 New York City Council election, District 39 Democratic primary
Party	Candidate	Maximum round	Maximum votes	Share in maximum round	Maximum votes First round votes Transfer votes
Democratic	Shahana Hanif	6	15,980	57.0%	
Democratic	Brandon West	6	12,058	43.0%	
Democratic	Justin Krebs	5	8,913	27.6%	
Democratic	Doug Schneider	4	5,854	17.1%	
Democratic	Briget Rein	3	2,634	7.4%	
Democratic	Jessica Simmons	3	1,634	4.6%	
Democratic	Mamnun Haq	2	1,460	4.1%	
Write-in		1	90	0.2%	

An interactive map of District 39

2021 New York City Council election, District 39 general election
Party	Candidate	Votes	%
Democratic	Shahana Hanif	25,306	
Working Families	Shahana Hanif	5,090	
Total	Shahana Hanif	30,396	89.1
Conservative	Brett Wynkoop	2,657	7.8
Libertarian	Matthew Morgan	939	2.8
Write-in		134	0.3
Total votes		34,126	100
Democratic hold			

=== 2017 ===
2017 New York City Council election, District 39
Party	Candidate	Votes	%
Democratic	Brad Lander	24,806	
Working Families	Brad Lander	6,749	
Total	Brad Lander (incumbent)	31,555	98.5
Write-in		485	1.5
Total votes		32,040	100
Democratic hold			

=== 2013 ===
2013 New York City Council election, District 39
Party	Candidate	Votes	%
Democratic	Brad Lander	22,725	
Working Families	Brad Lander	5,270	
Total	Brad Lander (incumbent)	27,995	91.7
Conservative	James Murray	2,469	8.1
Write-in		52	0.2
Total votes		30,522	100
Democratic hold			

=== 2009 ===
2009 New York City Council election, District 39
Primary election
Party	Candidate	Votes	%
Democratic	Brad Lander	5,346	40.6
Democratic	Josh Skaller	3,284	24.9
Democratic	John Heyer II	3,042	23.1
Democratic	Bob Zuckerman	1,029	7.8
Democratic	Gary Reilly	476	3.6
Write-in		2	0.0
Total votes		13,179	100
Republican	Joe Nardiello	365	88.9
Republican	George Smith	147	11.1
Write-in		0	0.0
Total votes		512	100
Working Families	Brad Lander	31	100
Write-in		0	0.0
Total votes		31	100
General election
Democratic	Brad Lander	13,401	
Working Families	Brad Lander	2,687	
Total	Brad Lander	16,088	70.5
Republican	Joe Nardiello	3,784	16.6
Green	David Pechefsky	2,024	8.8
Conservative	George Smith	672	3.0
Libertarian	Roger Sarrabo	253	1.1
Write-in		1	0.0
Total votes		22,822	100
Democratic hold			
