= Jabari Brisport =

American politician, activist, actor, and teacher (born 1987)

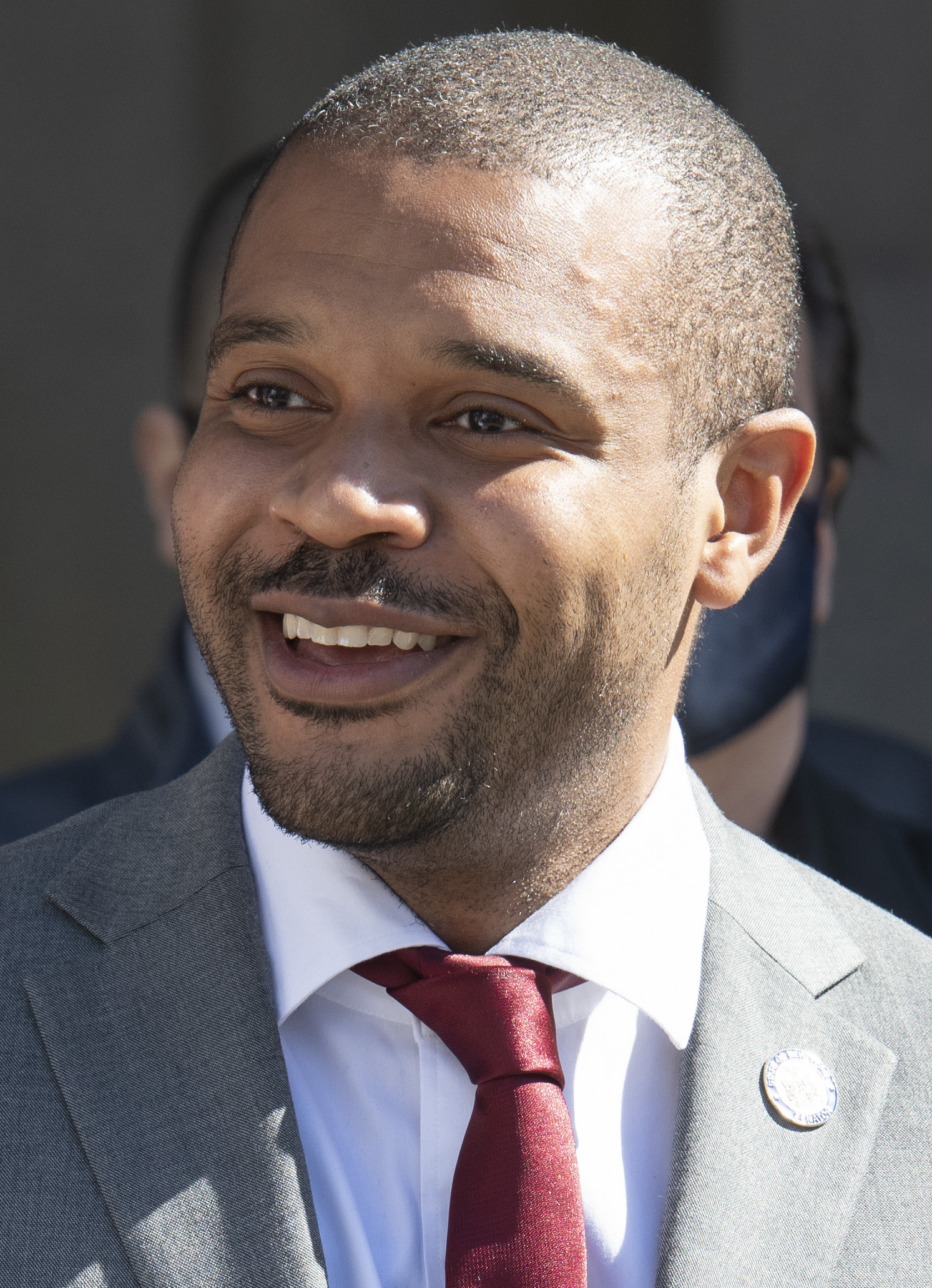
- Brisport in 2021

Member of the New York State Senate from the 25th district
- Incumbent
- Assumed office January 1, 2021
- Preceded by: Velmanette Montgomery

Personal details
- Born: August 9, 1987 (age 39) Brooklyn, New York, U.S.
- Party: Green (before 2019); Democratic (2019–present)
- Other political affiliations: Democratic Socialists of America
- Education: New York University (BFA); Yale University (MFA)
- Website: Campaign website

Jabari Brisport (born August 9, 1987) is an American politician, activist, and former public school teacher. He is the state senator for New York's 25th State Senate district in Brooklyn, and the first openly gay person of color to be elected to the New York State Legislature.

== Early life and education ==
Brisport was raised in Prospect Heights, Brooklyn, by a Guyanese immigrant father and a second-generation Guyanese mother who was born in Brooklyn. During Brisport's childhood, his father worked at a sheet metal factory and his mother was an office manager.

Brisport graduated from Poly Prep, a private high school in Dyker Heights, Brooklyn. He also earned degrees from New York University and Yale University.

== Career ==
=== Education ===
Brisport taught primarily math to sixth- and seventh-graders at a public school in Crown Heights, Brooklyn. He is a member of the United Federation of Teachers (UFT).

=== Activism ===
At age 22, Brisport began organizing efforts in support of a bill to legalize same-sex marriage in New York. A few years later, he got involved in the burgeoning Black Lives Matter movement and began organizing rallies and protests, as well as training protesters on what to do if stopped or harassed by the police. In 2017, he traveled to Charlottesville, Virginia, to march in the counter-protest of a Unite the Right rally.

Brisport joined the New York City chapter of Democratic Socialists of America (DSA) shortly after Donald Trump was elected president, and got involved in its work on access to affordable housing. He quickly became a leader in the fight against the private development of the Bedford Union Armory in Crown Heights.

=== 2017 City Council race ===
In 2017, Brisport ran against incumbent Laurie Cumbo in the 35th New York City Council District. In a rare Green Party primary, he defeated Scott Hutchinson, 32 votes to 4. Brisport was partially inspired to run for office by Senator Bernie Sanders and Congresswoman Alexandria Ocasio-Cortez. He was endorsed by Our Revolution, New York Communities for Change, and the New York Chapter of Democratic Socialists of America (DSA). He lost the election, receiving 29% of the vote. Brisport earned more independent votes than any council candidate since 2003.

=== New York State Senate ===
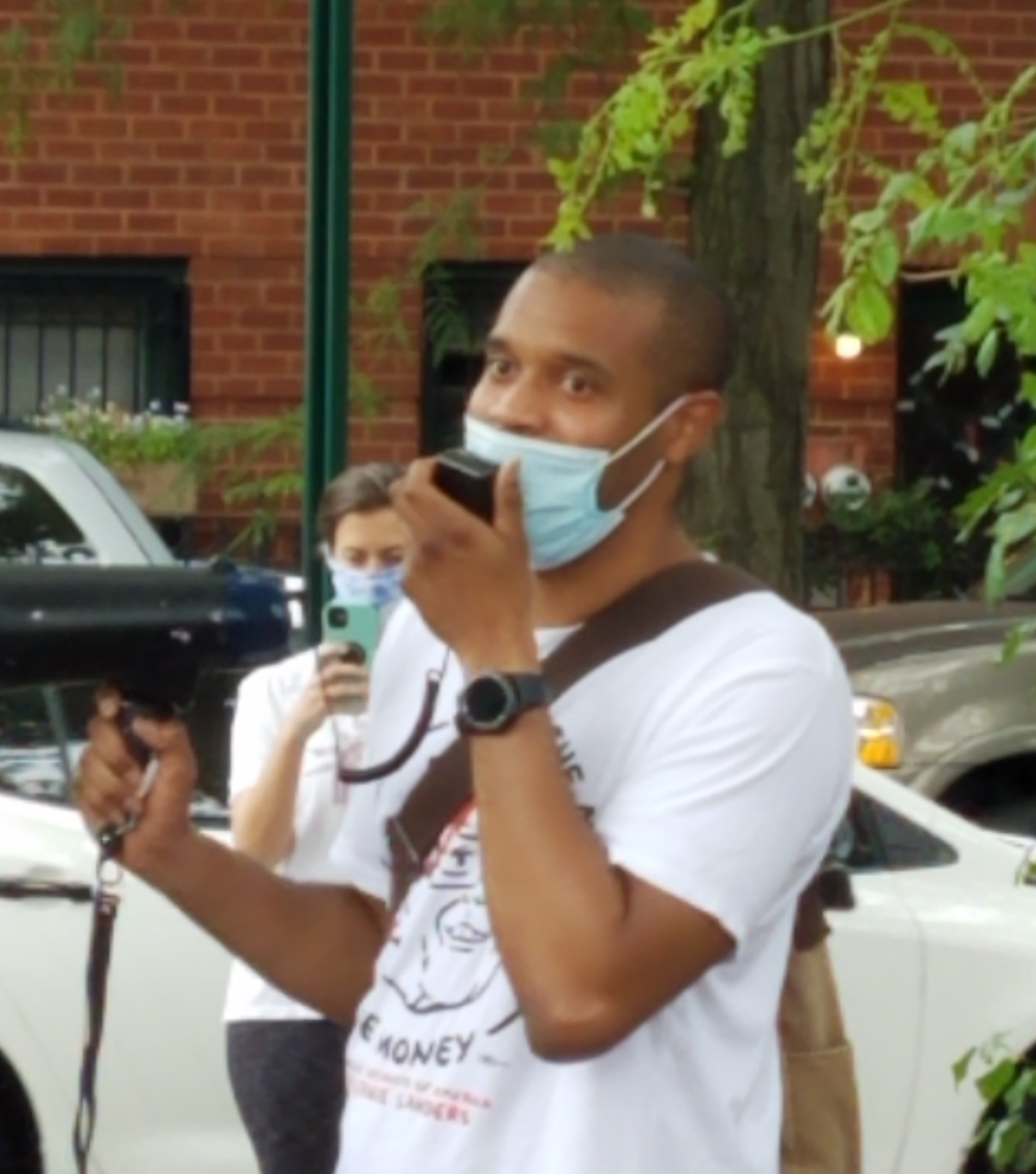
Brisport speaking at a protest in June 2020

In 2019, Brisport announced a run for the New York State Senate 25th District seat being vacated by Velmanette Montgomery. On September 29, 2019, he was endorsed by the Democratic Socialists of America. His campaign did not accept donations from the real estate industry or for-profit corporations. Instead, it received donations from over 7,000 individuals, breaking the record for most donors to a New York State-level campaign. According to the campaign, it also had the support of over 1,000 volunteers. His campaign was also endorsed by Ocasio-Cortez, Sanders, Cynthia Nixon, New York Communities for Change, and the Working Families Party.

On election night of the Democratic primary on June 23, 2020, Brisport led the race with 52.25% of the vote against sitting Assemblywoman Tremaine Wright and former Montgomery staffer Jason Salmon. But there were more absentee ballots than usual due to the COVID-19 pandemic, and on election night 26,000 absentee ballots remained uncounted. Brisport declared victory on July 23, once the absentee ballots had been counted and his lead over Wright had grown to 10,000 votes. He won the November general election, becoming the first openly gay person of color ever elected to the New York legislature. He is a member of the New York State Socialists in Office.

In 2022, Brisport faced Conrad Tillard in the State Senate district 25 race. Brisport was backed by the DSA and by unions including 1199SEIU and District Council 37. Tillard was endorsed by New York City Mayor Eric Adams, State Senator Kevin Parker, and former New York City Councilman Robert Cornegy. Tillard ran as a more moderate and centrist candidate than Brisport, and was critical of his support of socialism. Brisport won re-nomination in the three-way race, with 70% of the vote to Tillard's 16%.

Brisport faced community organizer Marlon Rice in the Democratic primary on June 23, 2026. Brisport won the primary, with 73% of the vote to Rice's 20%.

=== Political positions ===
Brisport came to identify as a democratic socialist through Bernie Sanders's presidential campaign, for which he volunteered as a canvasser and phone-banker. He is a member of the Democratic Socialists of America (DSA).

Brisport was arrested while protesting the re-development of the vacant Bedford Union Armory in Crown Heights, Brooklyn. He argued that the development should be 100% affordable housing. He has advocated for a vacancy tax and a pied-à-terre tax.

Brisport is an advocate for the New York Health Act, which would establish single-payer healthcare in New York State. He starred in a 2021 advertisement for the Campaign for New York Health along with then-assemblyman Zohran Mamdani, portraying a firefighter.

Brisport supports the elimination of cash bail, the legalization of injection sites for drug users, the restoration of voting rights for persons who have been incarcerated, elder parole, and the decriminalization of prostitution.

During his 2017 campaign for the New York City Council, Brisport pledged to reduce his $148,000 council salary to $47,000, the median income in Brooklyn at the time and direct the remainder toward increasing staff pay, arguing that elected officials should not earn substantially more than the constituents they represent. Since taking office, Brisport has not reduced his salary and has accepted the full council compensation. In 2023, Brisport even voted to increase pay for himself and other lawmakers, bumping the salary floor from $110,000 to $142,000.

== Electoral history ==
=== 2017 ===
2017 New York City Council election, District 35
Primary election
| Party | Candidate | Votes | % |
|---|---|---|---|
| Democratic | Laurie Cumbo (incumbent) | 10,421 | 57.4 |
| Democratic | Ede Fox | 7,549 | 41.6 |
| Democratic | Jabari Brisport (write-in) | 113 | 0.6 |
| Write-in | | 63 | 0.4 |
| Total votes | | 18,146 | 100 |
| Green | Jabari Brisport | 32 | 88.9 |
| Green | Scott Hutchins | 4 | 11.1 |
| Write-in | | 0 | 0.0 |
| Total votes | | 36 | 100 |
General election
| Democratic | Laurie Cumbo (incumbent) | 21,695 | 67.2 |
| Green | Jabari Brisport | 8,117 | |
| Socialist | Jabari Brisport | 1,190 | |
| Total | Jabari Brisport | 9,307 | 28.8 |
| Republican | Christine Parker | 1,203 | 3.7 |
| Write-in | | 57 | 0.3 |
| Total votes | | 32,262 | 100 |
| Democratic hold | | | |

=== 2020 ===
2020 New York State Senate election, District 25
Primary election
| Party | Candidate | Votes | % |
|---|---|---|---|
| Democratic | Jabari Brisport | 33,510 | 57.7 |
| Democratic | Tremaine Wright | 20,229 | 34.8 |
| Democratic | Jason Salmon | 4,270 | 7.4 |
| Write-in | | 86 | 0.1 |
| Total votes | | 58,095 | 100.0 |
General election
| Democratic | Jabari Brisport | 108,059 | |
| Working Families | Jabari Brisport | 30,202 | |
| Total | Jabari Brisport | 138,261 | 99.6 |
| Write-in | | 522 | 0.4 |
| Total votes | | 138,783 | 100.0 |
| Democratic hold | | | |

=== 2022 ===
2022 New York State Senate election, District 25
Primary election
| Party | Candidate | Votes | % |
|---|---|---|---|
| Democratic | Jabari Brisport (incumbent) | 12,492 | 70.4 |
| Democratic | Conrad Tillard | 2,710 | 15.3 |
| Democratic | Renee Holmes | 2,475 | 13.9 |
| Write-in | | 66 | 0.4 |
| Total votes | | 17,743 | 100.0 |
General election
| Democratic | Jabari Brisport | 50,505 | |
| Working Families | Jabari Brisport | 12,512 | |
| Total | Jabari Brisport (incumbent) | 63,017 | 99.5 |
| Write-in | | 328 | 0.5 |
| Total votes | | 63,345 | 100.0 |
| Democratic hold | | | |

=== 2024 ===
2024 New York State Senate election, District 25
| Party | Candidate | Votes | % |
|---|---|---|---|
| Democratic | Jabari Brisport (incumbent) | 90,484 | 99.4 |
| Write-in | | 525 | 0.6 |
| Total votes | | 91,009 | 100.0 |
| Democratic hold | | | |

=== 2026 ===
2026 New York State Senate election, District 25
Primary election
| Party | Candidate | Votes | % |
|---|---|---|---|
| Democratic | Jabari Brisport (incumbent) | 22,779 | 72.80 |
| Democratic | Marlon Rice | 6,204 | 19.83 |
| Write-in | | | 0.4 |
| Total votes | | 31,291 | 100.0 |
