= New York's 25th State Senate district =

American legislative district

Senator
| Jabari Brisport; D–Clinton Hill |
- Registration: 79.4% Democratic; 3.2% Republican; 14.4% No party preference
- Demographics: 26% White; 47% Black; 18% Hispanic; 6% Asian
- Population (2017): 351,552
- Registered voters: 257,080

New York's 25th State Senate district is one of 63 districts in the New York State Senate. It has been represented by Democrat Jabari Brisport since 2021, succeeding fellow Democrat Velmanette Montgomery. District 25 is currently the most Democratic-leaning district in the Senate.

== Geography ==
=== 2020s ===
District 25 covers central and eastern Brooklyn. It includes most or all of Bedford-Stuyvesant, Clinton Hill, Fort Greene and Ocean Hill and portions of Crown Heights, Prospect Heights, Downtown Brooklyn, Bushwick and Brownsville.

The district overlaps with New York's 7th, 8th, 9th, and 10th congressional districts, the 44th, 52nd, 54th, 55th, 56th and 57th districts of the New York State Assembly, and the 33rd, 35th, 36th, 37th, 39th, 41st and 42nd districts of the New York City Council.

=== 2010s ===
District 25 covers a stretch of eastern and north-central Brooklyn, including the neighborhoods of Fort Greene, Boerum Hill, Red Hook, Bedford-Stuyvesant, Sunset Park, Gowanus, and Park Slope.

The district overlaps with New York's 7th, 8th, 9th, and 10th congressional districts, and with the 43rd, 50th, 51st, 52nd, 54th, 55th, 56th, and 57th districts of the New York State Assembly.

== Recent election results ==
=== 2026 ===
2026 New York State Senate election, District 25
Primary election
| Party | Candidate | Votes | % |
|---|---|---|---|
| Democratic | Jabari Brisport (incumbent) | 23,922 | 78.3 |
| Democratic | Marlon Rice | 6,483 | 21.2 |
| Write-in | | 133 | 0.4 |
| Total votes | | 30,538 | 100.0 |
General election
| Democratic | Jabari Brisport | | |
| Working Families | Jabari Brisport | | |
| Total | Jabari Brisport (incumbent) | | |
| Write-in | | | |
| Total votes | | | 100.0 |

=== 2024 ===
2024 New York State Senate election, District 25
| Party | Candidate | Votes | % |
|---|---|---|---|
| Democratic | Jabari Brisport (incumbent) | 90,484 | 99.4 |
| Write-in | | 525 | 0.6 |
| Total votes | | 91,009 | 100.0 |
| Democratic hold | | | |

=== 2022 ===
2022 New York State Senate election, District 25
Primary election
| Party | Candidate | Votes | % |
|---|---|---|---|
| Democratic | Jabari Brisport (incumbent) | 12,492 | 70.4 |
| Democratic | Conrad Tillard | 2,710 | 15.3 |
| Democratic | Renee Holmes | 2,475 | 13.9 |
| Write-in | | 66 | 0.4 |
| Total votes | | 17,743 | 100.0 |
General election
| Democratic | Jabari Brisport | 50,505 | |
| Working Families | Jabari Brisport | 12,512 | |
| Total | Jabari Brisport (incumbent) | 63,017 | 99.5 |
| Write-in | | 328 | 0.5 |
| Total votes | | 63,345 | 100.0 |
| Democratic hold | | | |

=== 2020 ===
2020 New York State Senate election, District 25
Primary election
| Party | Candidate | Votes | % |
|---|---|---|---|
| Democratic | Jabari Brisport | 33,510 | 57.7 |
| Democratic | Tremaine Wright | 20,229 | 34.8 |
| Democratic | Jason Salmon | 4,270 | 7.4 |
| Write-in | | 86 | 0.1 |
| Total votes | | 58,095 | 100.0 |
General election
| Democratic | Jabari Brisport | 108,059 | |
| Working Families | Jabari Brisport | 30,202 | |
| Total | Jabari Brisport | 138,261 | 99.6 |
| Write-in | | 522 | 0.4 |
| Total votes | | 138,783 | 100.0 |
| Democratic hold | | | |

=== 2018 ===
2018 New York State Senate election, District 25
| Party | Candidate | Votes | % |
|---|---|---|---|
| Democratic | Velmanette Montgomery | 99,071 | |
| Working Families | Velmanette Montgomery | 11,104 | |
| Total | Velmanette Montgomery (incumbent) | 110,175 | 99.7 |
| Write-in | | 343 | 0.3 |
| Total votes | | 110,518 | 100.0 |
| Democratic hold | | | |

=== 2016 ===
2016 New York State Senate election, District 25
Primary election
| Party | Candidate | Votes | % |
|---|---|---|---|
| Democratic | Velmanette Montgomery (incumbent) | 10,579 | 68.9 |
| Democratic | Michael Cox | 4,719 | 30.7 |
| Write-in | | 60 | 0.4 |
| Total votes | | 15,358 | 100.0 |
General election
| Democratic | Velmanette Montgomery | 105,945 | |
| Working Families | Velmanette Montgomery | 8,998 | |
| Total | Velmanette Montgomery (incumbent) | 114,943 | 93.3 |
| Independence | Michael Cox | 4,247 | 3.4 |
| Republican | Mamie Rose | 3,896 | 3.2 |
| Write-in | | 110 | 0.1 |
| Total votes | | 123,196 | 100.0 |
| Democratic hold | | | |

=== 2014 ===
2014 New York State Senate election, District 25
| Party | Candidate | Votes | % |
|---|---|---|---|
| Democratic | Velmanette Montgomery | 36,595 | |
| Working Families | Velmanette Montgomery | 7,599 | |
| Total | Velmanette Montgomery (incumbent) | 44,194 | 99.7 |
| Write-in | | 134 | 0.3 |
| Total votes | | 44,328 | 100.0 |
| Democratic hold | | | |

=== 2012 ===
2012 New York State Senate election, District 25
| Party | Candidate | Votes | % |
|---|---|---|---|
| Democratic | Velmanette Montgomery | 96,423 | |
| Working Families | Velmanette Montgomery | 6,517 | |
| Total | Velmanette Montgomery (incumbent) | 102,940 | 97.2 |
| Republican | John Jasilli | 2,501 | |
| Conservative | John Jasilli | 443 | |
| Total | John Jasilli | 2,944 | 2.8 |
| Write-in | | 44 | 0.0 |
| Total votes | | 105,928 | 100.0 |
| Democratic hold | | | |

=== Federal results in District 25 ===
| Year | Office | Results |
|---|---|---|
| 2020 | President | Biden 93.9 – 4.8% |
| 2016 | President | Clinton 94.5 – 2.9% |
| 2012 | President | Obama 96.5 – 2.4% |
| 2012 | Senate | Gillibrand 96.4 – 2.1% |
